= Turkish Karate Federation =

Governing body for Karate in Turkey

Turkey Karate Federation
- Abbreviation: TKF
- Formation: 1981
- Type: Sports federation
- Headquarters: Ulus, Ankara, Turkey
- Coordinates: 39°56′30.85″N 32°51′15.60″E
- President: Ercüment TAŞDEMİR
- Affiliations: World Karate Federation (WKF); European Karate Federation (EKF)
- Website: www.karate.gov.tr

Turkey Karate Federation (Turkish: Türkiye Karate Federasyonu, TKF) is the governing body for Karate in Turkey. It aims to govern, encourage and develop the sport for all throughout the country. Karate sport was governed in the 1970s under the Turkish Judo Federation. In 1980, the federation was renamed Judo and Karate. Finally, it became an independent organization in 1990. It is headquartered in Ankara. TKF is a member of the European Karate Federation (EKF).

The federation organizes the national Karate events, and European and World championships hosted by Turkey.

== International achievements ==
=== Olympics ===
Year	Host country	Rank	Gold	Silver	Bronze	Total
2020	Japan	10	0	1	3	4

=== World Games ===
Year	Host country	Rank	Gold	Silver	Bronze	Total
2005	Germany	8	1	0	0	1
2009	Chinese Taipei	20	0	0	2	2
2013	Colombia	7	1	0	0	1
2017	Poland	13	0	0	2	2

=== World Championships ===
Year	Host country	Rank	Gold	Silver	Bronze	Total
1990	Mexico	7	1	0	4	5
1992	Spain	5	1	2	1	3
1994	Malaysia	9	0	1	3	4
1996	South Africa	12	0	1	2	3
1998	Brazil	3	2	0	3	5
2000	Germany	6	1	0	1	2
2002	Spain	18	0	0	3	3
2004	Mexico	5	2	0	1	3
2006	Finland	7	1	0	0	1
2008	Japan	5	1	1	2	4
2010	Serbia	14	0	1	1	2
2012	France	4	1	2	3	6
2014	Germany	4	2	0	3	5
2016	Austria	19	0	0	1	1
2018	Spain	12	0	2	4	6
2021	United Arab Emirates	17	0	0	2	2
2023	Hungary	3	2	2	1	5
Total			14	12	35	61

=== European Championships ===
Year	Host country	Rank	Gold	Silver	Bronze	Total
1988	Italy	12	0	0	1	1
1989	Yugoslavia	10	0	1	0	1
1990	Austria	13	0	0	1	1
1991	Germany	5	1	1	1	3
1992	Netherlands	9	0	1	2	3
1993	Czech Republic	7	1	0	0	1
1994	England	5	1	1	0	2
1995	Finland	7	0	1	4	5
1996	France	9	0	1	4	5
1997	Spain	4	2	0	1	3
1998	Serbia	6	1	1	6	8
1999	Greece	4	2	2	4	8
2000	Turkey	4	2	3	4	9
2001	Bulgaria	4	1	2	2	5
2002	Estonia	4	1	1	0	2
2003	Germany	5	2	1	1	4
2004	Russia	4	2	2	2	6
2005	Spain	6	1	1	4	6
2006	Norway	4	2	3	0	5
2007	Slovakia	2	3	3	2	8
2008	Estonia	6	1	1	8	10
2009	Serbia	4	2	1	4	7
2010	Greece	5	1	2	2	5
2011	Switzerland	8	1	0	2	3
2012	Spain	3	3	2	4	9
2013	Hungary	1	4	2	3	9
2014	Finland	2	3	3	3	9
2015	Turkey	2	2	6	3	11
2016	France	4	1	5	6	12
2017	Turkey	1	4	4	6	14
2018	Serbia	2	3	1	6	10
2019	Spain	2	3	4	4	11
2021	Croatia	1	6	2	1	9
2022	Turkey	1	7	1	1	9
2023	Spain	6	1	2	7	10
2024	Croatia	1	3	0	7	10
Total			67	61	106	234

=== European Games ===
Year	Host country	Rank	Gold	Silver	Bronze	Total
2015	Azerbaijan	2	3	2	4	9
2019	Belarus	9	0	4	2	6
2023	Poland	5	1	1	4	6

=== Mediterranean Games ===
Year	Host country	Rank	Gold	Silver	Bronze	Total
1993	France	-	1	0	1	2
1997	Italy	-	1	1	6	8
2001	Tunisia	5	1	0	1	2
2005	Spain	5	1	1	5	7
2009	Italy	6	1	0	3	4
2013	Turkey	1	6	2	0	8
2018	Spain	1	2	2	3	7
2022	Algeria	4	1	0	4	5

=== Islamic Solidarity Games ===
Year	Host country	Rank	Gold	Silver	Bronze	Total
2005	Saudi Arabia	6	1	0	1	2
2013	Indonesia	4	1	2	9	12
2017	Azerbaijan	2	2	6	3	11
2021	Turkey	1	4	2	4	10

== Champion Karateka ==
Men

- Enes Erkan, World (2012, 2014), European (2013, 2014), European Games (2015)
- Haldun Alagaş, World (1990, 1998), European (1991, 1997, 2000)
- Ali Sofuoğlu, Olympic medalist, World (2023), European (2021, 2022, 2024)
- Zeynel Çelik, World (2004), European (1999)
- Veysel Burgur, World (1992)
- Uğur Aktaş, Olympic medalist, European (2016, 2017, 2019, 2021)
- Burak Uygur, European (2017, 2018, 2022), European Games (2015)
- Eray Şamdan, Olympic medalist, European (2021, 2022), European Games (2023)
- Hakan Yağlı, European (1994, 1998)
- Eray Şamdan, European (2021, 2022)
- Zeki Demir, European (2006)
- Yücel Gündoğdu, European (2007)
- Aykut Kaya, European (2013)
- Ömer Kemaloğlu, European (2008)
- Erman Eltemur, European (2022)

Women

- Yıldız Aras, World Games (2005), World (2000, 2006), European (2000, 2002, 2003, 2004, 2005, 2007, 2009)
- Serap Özçelik, World Games (2013), World (2014), European (2011, 2012, 2014, 2018, 2021, 2022), European Games (2015)
- Tuba Yakan, World (2023), European (2013, 2017)
- Merve Çoban, Olympic medalist, European (2019)
- Hafsa Şeyda Burucu, European (2012, 2013)
- Gülderen Çelik, European (2003, 2007)
- Nurhan Fırat, European (1993, 1997)
- Meltem Hocaoğlu, European (2021)
- Eda Eltemur, European (2022)
- Dilara Bozan, European (2024)

== International competitions in Turkey ==
- 2000 European Karate Championships - May 5–7, 2000 Istanbul
- Karate at the 2013 Mediterranean Games - June 28–29, 2013 Mersin
- 2015 European Karate Championships - March 19–22, 2015 Istanbul
- 2017 European Karate Championships - May 4–7, 2017 İzmit
- Karate at the 2017 Summer Deaflympics - July 24–26, 2017 Samsun
- 2022 European Karate Championships - May 25–29, 2022 Gaziantep
- Karate at the 2021 Islamic Solidarity Games - August 17–18, 2022 Konya
- 2022 World Cadet, Junior and U21 Karate Championships - October 26–30, 2022 Konya
