= Karate at the World Games =

Competition details
- Discipline: Karate
- Type: kumite and kata, biennial
- Organiser: World Karate Federation (WKF)

Karate was introduced as a World Games sport at the 1981 World Games in Santa Clara, California. Karate has been a World Games sport in every edition of The World Games. There have been kata and kumite events at every edition of the games.

== Medalists ==
=== Men ===
==== Kata ====
Games	Gold	Silver	Bronze
1981 Santa Clara	Keji Okada (JPN)	Masashi Koyama (JPN)	Domingo Llanos (USA)
1985 London	Tsuguo Sakamoto (JPN)	Masashi Koyama (JPN)	Julio Martinez (USA)
1989 Karlsruhe	Tsuguo Sakamoto (JPN)	Dario Marchini (ITA)	Tomoyuki Aihara (JPN); Pasquale Acri (ITA)
1993 The Hague	Ryoki Abe (JPN)	Pasquale Acri (ITA)	Laurent Riccio (FRA)
1997 Lahti	Ryoki Abe (JPN)	Lucio Maurino (ITA)	Yukimitsu Hasegawa (JPN)
2001 Akita	Ryoki Abe (JPN)	Luca Valdesi (ITA)	Antonio Díaz (VEN)
2005 Duisburg	Antonio Díaz (VEN)	Luca Valdesi (ITA)	Akio Tamashiro (PER)
2009 Kaohsiung	Luca Valdesi (ITA)	Vu Duc Minh Dack (FRA)	Antonio Díaz (VEN)
2013 Cali	Antonio Díaz (VEN)	Ibrahim Magdy Ahmed (EGY)	Ryo Kiyuna (JPN)
2017 Wrocław	Ryo Kiyuna (JPN)	Damián Quintero (ESP)	Antonio Díaz (VEN)
2022 Birmingham	Kazumasa Moto (JPN)	Damián Quintero (ESP)	Gakuji Tozaki (USA)
2025 Chengdu	Kakeru Nishiyama (JPN)	Ariel Torres (USA)	Alessio Ghinami (ITA)

==== Kumite −60 kg ====
Games	Gold	Silver	Bronze
1981 Santa Clara	Masayuki Naito (JPN)	Fernando Roseuero (ESP)	Joe Tierney (GBR); Giuseppe Tinnirello (ITA)
1985 London	Sinichi Hasegawa (JPN)	Ino Alberto (NED)	Jean-Louis Granet (FRA); Abdu Shaher (GBR)
1989 Karlsruhe	Stein Rønning (NOR)	Nicola Simmi (ITA)	Sinichi Hasegawa (JPN); Abdu Shaher (GBR)
1993 The Hague	Norimassa Fujita (JPN)	Veysel Bugur (TUR)	Damien Dovy (FRA); Peter Overbeck (GER)
1997 Lahti	David Luque (ESP)	Michal Šebesta (SVK)	Alessandro Lancione (ITA); Shinichiro Yamamoto (JPN)
2001 Akita	Kenichi Imai (JPN)	Francesco Ortu (ITA)	Milo Hodge (GBR)
2005 Duisburg	Michele Giuliani (ITA)	Yuriy Kalashnikov (RUS)	Miguel Yépez (VEN)
2009 Kaohsiung	Douglas Brose (BRA)	Hsia Wenhaung (TPE)	Danil Domdjoni (CRO)
2013 Cali	Andrés Rendón (COL)	Douglas Brose (BRA)	El Mehdi Benrouida (MAR)
2017 Wrocław	Firdovsi Farzaliyev (AZE)	Amir Mehdizadeh (IRI)	Matías Gómez (ESP)
2022 Birmingham	Ayoub Anis Helassa (ALG)	Douglas Brose (BRA)	Angelo Crescenzo (ITA)
2025 Chengdu	Eray Samdan (TUR)	Hiromu Hashimoto (JPN)	Christos Xenos (GRE)

==== Kumite −65 kg ====
Games	Gold	Silver	Bronze
1981 Santa Clara	Yoshikazu Ono (JPN)	Toshiaki Maeda (JPN)	Robert De Luca (ITA); Kesayoshi Yokouchi (JPN)
1985 London	Roel van Loen (NED)	Arno Lund (NOR)	Ignacio Lugo (MEX); Ramon Malave (SWE)
1989 Karlsruhe	Janne Timonen (FIN)	Reginaldo Doran (NED)	Francesco Muffato (ITA); Jesús Juan Rubio (ESP)
1993 The Hague	Murat Uysal (GER)	Michael Braun (FRA)	Jeffrey Snel (NED)
1997 Lahti	Marc Golding (AUS)	Olli Ortiz (FIN)	Sveinung Byberg (NOR); Jukka Koivunen (FIN)
2001 Akita	Jason Ledgister (GBR)	Jean Carlos Peña (VEN)	Yusuke Inokoshi (JPN)
2005 Duisburg	Dimitrios Triantafyllis (GRE)	Luis Plumacher (VEN)	Christian Grüner (GER)
2009 Kaohsiung	Ádám Kovács (HUN)	William Rollé (FRA)	Ömer Kemaloğlu (TUR)

==== Kumite −67 kg ====
Games	Gold	Silver	Bronze
2013 Cali	José Ramírez (COL)	Magdy Mamdouh Mohamed (EGY)	Tsuneari Yahiro (AUS)
2017 Wrocław	Steven Da Costa (FRA)	Jordan Thomas (GBR)	Deivis Ferreras (DOM)
2022 Birmingham	Vinícius Figueira (BRA)	Yves Martial Tadissi (HUN)	Dionysios Xenos (GRE)
2025 Chengdu	Said Oubaya (MAR)	Yugo Kozaki (JPN)	Abdel Almasatfa (JOR)

==== Kumite −70 kg ====
Games	Gold	Silver	Bronze
1981 Santa Clara	Cecil Hackett (GBR)	Bernard Bilicki (FRA)	Yukiyoshi Marutani (JPN); Seiji Nishimura (JPN)
1985 London	Cecil Hackett (GBR)	Jim Collins (GBR)	Kyo Hayashi (JPN); Thierry Masci (FRA)
1989 Karlsruhe	Jörg Reus (GER)	William Thomas (GBR)	Yoshimiro Anzai (JPN); Appie Echteld (NED)
1993 The Hague	Junichi Watanabe (JPN)	Massimiliano Oggiano (ITA)	Ronny Rivano (NED); William Thomas (GBR)
1997 Lahti	Claudio della Rocca (ITA)	Kimmo Obiora (FIN)	Reza Mohseni (SWE)
2001 Akita	Yasuhisa Inada (JPN)	Yoshinori Matsumoto (JPN)	Hussein el-Desouky (EGY)
2005 Duisburg	Giuseppe di Domenico (ITA)	Emilio Oviedo (MEX)	Sayguidmagomed Shakhrudinov (RUS)
2009 Kaohsiung	Jean Carlos Peña (VEN)	Shinji Nagaki (JPN)	Tamer Mourssy (EGY)

==== Kumite −75 kg ====
Games	Gold	Silver	Bronze
1981 Santa Clara	Lin Chi-min (TPE)	Fred Royers (NED)	Gouze (FRA); Ángel López (ESP)
1985 London	Yorihisa Uchida (JPN)	Serge Serfati (ITA)	D. Beam (USA); Didier Moreau (FRA)
1989 Karlsruhe	Toni Dietl (FRG)	Djim Doula (SUI)	Ko Haashi (JPN); Kosta Sariyannis (FRG)
1993 The Hague	Wayne Otto (GBR)	Gabriel Berg (SWE)	Ali Aktepe (NED); Saeid Ashtian (IRI)
1997 Lahti	Salvatore Loria (ITA)	Jussi Immonen (FIN)	Alireza Katiraei (IRI); Kazuaki Matsumoto (JPN)
2001 Akita	Gennaro Talarico (ITA)	Takahiro Niki (JPN)	Adnan Hadzic (BIH)
2005 Duisburg	Köksal Cakir (GER)	Konstantinos Papadopoulos (GRE)	Klaudio Farmadin (SVK)
2009 Kaohsiung	Michail Georgios Tzanos (GRE)	Diego Vandeschrick (BEL)	Kou Matsuhisa (JPN)
2013 Cali	Rafael Aghayev (AZE)	Noah Bitsch (GER)	Mohamed Abdelrahman Ali (EGY)
2017 Wrocław	Stanislav Horuna (UKR)	Ali Asghar Asiabari (IRI)	Hernâni Veríssimo (BRA)
2022 Birmingham	Abdalla Abdelaziz (EGY)	Stanislav Horuna (UKR)	Dastonbek Otabolaev (UZB)
2025 Chengdu	Enzo Berthon (FRA)	Yusei Sakiyama (JPN)	Abdalla Abdelaziz (EGY)

==== Kumite −80 kg ====
Games	Gold	Silver	Bronze
1981 Santa Clara	Osamu Kamikodo (JPN)	Hisao Murase (JPN)	Tokey Hill (USA); Otti Roethoff (NED)
1985 London	Gianluca Guazzaroni (ITA)	Pierre Pinar (FRA)	Arild Engh (NOR); Mervyn Etienne (GBR)
1989 Karlsruhe	Gianluca Guazzaroni (ITA)	Kemal Aktepe (NED)	Sven Mohnssen (FRG); Ralf Wintergarst (FRG)
1993 The Hague	Augustus Paul (GBR)	Miko Virkola (FIN)	Peter Bathoorn (NED); Sami Tainen (FIN)
1997 Lahti	Toshihito Kokubun (JPN)	George Petermann (AUT)	Simon Adolfsson (SWE); Jørn Ove Hansen (NOR)
2001 Akita	Salvatore Loria (ITA)	William Finegan (USA)	Ryosuke Shimizu (JPN)
2005 Duisburg	Islamutdin Eldaruchev (RUS)	Salvatore Loria (ITA)	Philippe Poirier (CAN)
2009 Kaohsiung	Huang Hao-yun (TPE)	Islamutdin Eldaruchev (RUS)	Konstantinos Papadopoulos (GRE)

==== Kumite −84 kg ====
Games	Gold	Silver	Bronze
2013 Cali	Ryutaro Araga (JPN)	Hany Shaker Keshta (EGY)	Michail Georgios Tzanos (GRE)
2017 Wrocław	Zabihollah Pourshab (IRI)	Ryutaro Araga (JPN)	Uğur Aktaş (TUR)
2022 Birmingham	Youssef Badawy (EGY)	Nabil Ech-chaabi (MAR)	Kamran Madani (USA)
2025 Chengdu	Mohammad Aljafari (JOR)	Ivan Kvesic (CRO)	Rikito Shimada (JPN)

==== Kumite +80 kg ====
Games	Gold	Silver	Bronze
1981 Santa Clara	Ludwig Kotzebue (NED)	Mohammadjalal Mohammadian (IRI)	Claudio Guazzaroni (ITA); Francisco Torres (ESP)
1985 London	Mohammadjalal Mohammadian (IRI)	Leslie Jensen (SWE)	Karl Daggfeldt (SWE); Massimo di Luigi (ITA)
1989 Karlsruhe	Claudio Guazzaroni (ITA)	Ralf Brachmann (FRG)	Ian Cole (GBR); Juan Antonio Hernández (ESP)
1993 The Hague	Marc Hamon (CAN)	Ian Cole (GBR)	Pierre Amman (SUI); Hans Roovers (NED)
1997 Lahti	Leon Walters (GBR)	Davide Benetello (ITA)	Andrey Anikin (RUS); Gabriel Berg (SWE)
2001 Akita	Seydina Baldé (FRA)	Stefano Maniscalco (ITA)	Leon Walters (GBR)
2005 Duisburg	Alexander Gerunov (RUS)	Felix Kühnle (GER)	Alen Zamlic (CRO)
2009 Kaohsiung	Jonathan Horne (GER)	Spyridon Margaritopoulos (GRE)	Almir Cecunjanin (MNE)

==== Kumite +84 kg ====
Games	Gold	Silver	Bronze
2013 Cali	Jonathan Horne (GER)	Angel Aponte (VEN)	Shahin Atamov (AZE)
2017 Wrocław	Hideyoshi Kagawa (JPN)	Sajjad Ganjzadeh (IRI)	Michał Bąbos (POL)
2022 Birmingham	Babacar Seck (ESP)	Anđelo Kvesić (CRO)	Taha Tarek (EGY)
2025 Chengdu	Ryzvan Talibov (UKR)	Anđelo Kvesić (CRO)	Saleh Abazari (IRI)

==== Kumite open ====
Games	Gold	Silver	Bronze
1981 Santa Clara	Vic Charles (GBR)	Marc Pyrée (FRA)	Billy Blanks (USA); Claude Petinella (FRA)
1985 London	Vic Charles (GBR)	Emmanuel Pinda (FRA)	Arild Engh (NOR)
1989 Karlsruhe	Claudio Guazzaroni (ITA)	Yasumasa Shimizu (JPN)	Jürgen Möldner (GER); Marc Pyrée (FRA)
1993 The Hague	Rob Mol (NED)	Marc Hamon (CAN)	Rogier Alken (NED); Reza Mohseni (SWE)
1997 Lahti	Ian Cole (GBR)	Manabu Takenouchi (JPN)	Davide Benetello (ITA); Wayne Otto (GBR)
2001 Akita	David Félix (FRA)	Konstantinos Papadopoulos (GRE)	Craig Burke (GBR)
2005 Duisburg	Alexander Gerunov (RUS)	Shinji Nagaki (JPN)	Mohamed el-Shemy (EGY)
2009 Kaohsiung	Khalid Khalidov (KAZ)	Hany Shaker Keshta (EGY)	Almir Cecunjanin (MNE)

=== Women ===
==== Kata ====
Games	Gold	Silver	Bronze
1981 Santa Clara	Susuko Okamura (JPN)	Mie Nakayama (JPN)	María Moreno (ESP)
1985 London	Mie Nakayama (JPN)	Chu Meyyueh (TPE)	Stesuko Tajima (JPN)
1989 Karlsruhe	Yuki Mimura (JPN)	Hisami Yokoyama (JPN)	Simone Schreiner (FRG)
1993 The Hague	Yuki Mimura (JPN)	Simone Schreiner (GER)	Cathérine Bernard (FRA)
1997 Lahti	Atsuko Wakai (JPN)	Roberta Sodero (ITA)	Cinzia Colaiacomo (ITA)
2001 Akita	Atsuko Wakai (JPN)	Yohana Sànchez (VEN)	Junko Arai (USA)
2005 Duisburg	Atsuko Wakai (JPN)	Myriam Szkudlarek (FRA)	Ana Sofia Martínez (VEN)
2009 Kaohsiung	Nguyễn Hoàng Ngân (VIE)	María Dimitrova (DOM)	Sara Battaglia (ITA)
2013 Cali	Sandy Scordo (FRA)	Nguyễn Hoàng Ngân (VIE)	Sara Battaglia (ITA)
2017 Wrocław	Kiyou Shimizu (JPN)	Sandra Sánchez (ESP)	Sandy Scordo (FRA)
2022 Birmingham	Sandra Sánchez (ESP)	Hikaru Ono (JPN)	Grace Lau (HKG)
2025 Chengdu	Grace Lau (HKG)	Maho Ono (JPN)	Paola García Lozano (ESP)

==== Kumite −50 kg ====
Games	Gold	Silver	Bronze
2013 Cali	Serap Özçelik (TUR)	Alexandra Recchia (FRA)	Maria Alexiadis (AUS)
2017 Wrocław	Alexandra Recchia (FRA)	Miho Miyahara (JPN)	Serap Özçelik (TUR)
2022 Birmingham	Junna Tsukii (PHI)	Yorgelis Salazar (VEN)	Miho Miyahara (JPN)
2025 Chengdu	Sara Bahmanyar (IRI)	Moldir Zhangbyrbay (KAZ)	Ema Sgardelli (CRO)

==== Kumite −53 kg ====
Games	Gold	Silver	Bronze
1985 London	Cathérine Girardet (FRA)	Li Yan (TPE)	Alba Howard (USA); C. Sequara (VEN)
1989 Karlsruhe	Cathérine Girardet (FRA)	Gerlinde Bude (FRG)	Shirley Graham (GBR); Yuko Hasama (JPN)
1993 The Hague	Ivonne Senff (NED)	Marise Mazurier (FRA)	Sari Laine (FIN); Jillian Toney (GBR)
1997 Lahti	Jillian Toney (GBR)	Eri Fujioka (JPN)	Theresia Larsson (SWE); Michaela Nanni (ITA)
2001 Akita	Sachiko Miyamoto (JPN)	Eri Fujioka (JPN)	Sari Laine (FIN)
2005 Duisburg	Heba Aly (EGY)	Tomoko Araga (JPN)	Kora Knühmann (GER)
2009 Kaohsiung	Jelena Kovačević (CRO)	Chen Yen-hui (TPE)	Gülderen Çelik (TUR)

==== Kumite −55 kg ====
Games	Gold	Silver	Bronze
2013 Cali	Lucie Ignace (FRA)	Jelena Kovačević (CRO)	Yassmin Hamdy Attia (EGY)
2017 Wrocław	Valéria Kumizaki (BRA)	Wen Tzu-yun (TPE)	Sara Cardin (ITA)
2022 Birmingham	Anzhelika Terliuga (UKR)	Ahlam Youssef (EGY)	Trinity Allen (USA)
2025 Chengdu	Mia Bitsch (GER)	Anzhelika Terliuga (UKR)	Valentina Toro Meneses (CHI)

==== Kumite −60 kg ====
Games	Gold	Silver	Bronze
1985 London	Beverly Morris (GBR)	G. Black (USA)	Angelika Forster (FRG); Wang Kueiyang (TPE)
1989 Karlsruhe	Brigitte Thäle (FRG)	Annette Bailey (GBR)	Akemi Kimura (JPN); Junko Kurata (JPN)
1993 The Hague	Molly Samuel (GBR)	Annelies Bouma (NED)	Irene Lyez (AUT); Sari Nyback (FIN)
1997 Lahti	Chiara Stella Bux (ITA)	Julliet Toney (GBR)	Mayuni Baba (JPN); Carmen García (ESP)
2001 Akita	Karin Prinsloo (RSA)	Kellie Shimmings (AUS)	Roksanda Lazarevic (YUG)
2005 Duisburg	Snezana Peric (SCG)	Maria Musall (GER)	Lejla Ferhatbegovic (BIH)
2009 Kaohsiung	Mariya Sobol (RUS)	Eva Medvedová-Tulejová (SVK)	Ting Chang (TPE)

==== Kumite −61 kg ====
Games	Gold	Silver	Bronze
2013 Cali	Lina Gómez (COL)	Jacqueline Factos (ECU)	Olga Malofeeva (RUS)
2017 Wrocław	Alexandra Grande (PER)	Anita Serogina (UKR)	Ingrida Suchánková (SVK)
2022 Birmingham	Anita Serogina (UKR)	Alexandra Grande (PER)	Ingrida Suchánková (SVK)
2025 Chengdu	Li Gong (CHN)	Sarara Shimada (JPN)	Noursin Aly (EGY)

==== Kumite −68 kg ====
Games	Gold	Silver	Bronze
2013 Cali	Kayo Someya (JPN)	Ana Escandón (COL)	Cheryl Kimberly Murphy (USA)
2017 Wrocław	Lamya Matoub (ALG)	Alisa Buchinger (AUT)	Kayo Someya (JPN)
2022 Birmingham	Silvia Semeraro (ITA)	Alisa Buchinger (AUT)	Alizée Agier (FRA)
2025 Chengdu	Elena Quirici (SUI)	Iryna Zaretska (AZE)	Tsubasa Kama (JPN)

==== Kumite +60 kg ====
Games	Gold	Silver	Bronze
1985 London	Janice Argyle (GBR)	Rosa Maria Ghidotti (ITA)	Yvette Bryan (GBR); Stirre Nygaard (NOR)
1989 Karlsruhe	Cathérine Belhriti (FRA)	Marie-Ange Legros (FRA)	Diane Reilly (GBR); Simone Schreiner (FRG)
1993 The Hague	Karin Olsson (SWE)	Nurhan Firat (TUR)	Janice Francis (GBR); Yukiko Yoneda (JPN)
1997 Lahti	Yukiko Yoneda (JPN)	Christina Madrid (MEX)	Patricia Duggin (GBR); Michaela Fryblova (NOR)
2001 Akita	Emiko Honma (JPN)	Tessy Scholtes (LUX)	Tania Weekes (GBR)
2005 Duisburg	Nadine Ziemer (GER)	Elisa Au (USA)	Tania Weekes (GBR)
2009 Kaohsiung	Arnela Odžaković (BIH)	Tiffany Fanjat (FRA)	Silvia Sperner (GER)

==== Kumite +68 kg ====
Games	Gold	Silver	Bronze
2013 Cali	Ayumi Uekusa (JPN)	Nadege Ait Ibrahim (FRA)	Isabel Aco (PER)
2017 Wrocław	Ayumi Uekusa (JPN)	Hamideh Abbasali (IRI)	Anne-Laure Florentin (FRA)
2022 Birmingham	Sofya Berultseva (KAZ)	María Torres (ESP)	Chehinez Jemi (TUN)
2025 Chengdu	Johanna Kneer (GER)	María Torres (ESP)	Clio Ferracuti (ITA)

==== Kumite open ====
Games	Gold	Silver	Bronze
2005 Duisburg	Yildiz Aras (TUR)	Natasha Hardy (AUS)	Nadine Ziemer (GER)
2009 Kaohsiung	Eva Medvedová-Tulejová (SVK)	Letitia Carr (NZL)	Ema Aničić (CRO)

== See also ==
- Karate at the Summer Olympics
