= 1997 European Karate Championships =

Karate competition

- Location: Santa Cruz de Tenerife, Spain
- Dates: May 2 to 4

The 1997 European Karate Championships was held in Santa Cruz de Tenerife, Spain from 2–4 May 1997.

== Medal table ==
* Host nation (Spain)

| Rank | Nation | Gold | Silver | Bronze | Total |
|---|---|---|---|---|---|
| 1 | France | 6 | 3 | 6 | 15 |
| 2 | Italy | 4 | 4 | 3 | 11 |
| 3 | Spain* | 4 | 4 | 2 | 10 |
| 4 | Turkey | 2 | 0 | 1 | 3 |
| 5 | England | 1 | 0 | 3 | 4 |
| 6 | Slovenia | 0 | 2 | 1 | 3 |
| 7 | Germany | 0 | 1 | 6 | 7 |
| 8 | Belgium | 0 | 1 | 2 | 3 |
| 9 | Denmark | 0 | 1 | 0 | 1 |
| 9 | Yugoslavia | 0 | 1 | 0 | 1 |
| 11 | Finland | 0 | 0 | 2 | 2 |
| 12 | Austria | 0 | 0 | 1 | 1 |
| 12 | Croatia | 0 | 0 | 1 | 1 |
| 12 | Russia | 0 | 0 | 1 | 1 |
| 12 | Sweden | 0 | 0 | 1 | 1 |
| Totals (15 entries) | | 17 | 17 | 30 | 64 |

== Competition ==
| Event | Gold | Silver | Bronze |
|---|---|---|---|
| Kata | (France) Michael Milon | (Spain) Javier Hernández Alonso | (Italy) Luca Valdesi |
| Kumite -60 kg | (Spain) David Luque Camacho | (France) Damien Dovy | (Germany) Veysel Bugur (Slovakia) Michal Šebesta |
| Kumite -65 kg | (France) Alexandre Biamonti | (Belgium) Dave Versmissen | (Finland) Olli Ortiz (Italy) Daniele Simmi |
| Kumite -70 kg | (Turkey) Haldun Alagaş | (Slovenia) Clement Stanovnik | (Belgium) Junior Lefevre (Croatia) Goran Romić |
| Kumite -75 kg | (Italy) Salvatore Loria | (Denmark) Allan Busk | (France) Michaël Braun (Sweden) Fredrik Hulten |
| Kumite -80 kg | (France) Gilles Cherdieu | (Germany) Thomas Nitschmann | (France) Seydina Balde (England) Wayne Otto |
| Kumite + 80 kg | (Spain) Oscar Olivares | (Socialist Federal Republic of Yugoslavia) Teodor Rajić | (Russia) Andrey Anikin (England) Ian Cole |
| Open Kumite | (France) Christophe Pinna | (France) Seci Mecheri | (Germany) Andreas Horn (Belgium) Junior Lefevre |

=== Team ===
| Event | Gold | Silver | Bronze |
|---|---|---|---|
| Kata | France | Spain | Italy |
| Kumite | France | Italy | Germany; England |

=== Women's competition ===
==== Individual ====
| Event | Gold | Silver | Bronze |
|---|---|---|---|
| Kata | (Italy) Roberta Sodero | (Spain) Gema Mendez | (France) Michelle Forstin |
| Kumite -53 kg | (England) Jillian Toney | (Slovakia) Marianna Laukova | (Germany) Nicole Jacobs (Finland) Sari Laine |
| Kumite -60 kg | (Spain) Carmen Garcia | (France) Nathalie Leroy | (Italy) Chiara Stella Bux (Germany) Tunde Kovacs |
| Kumite +60 kg | (Turkey) Nurhan Fırat | (Italy) Roberta Minet | (Austria) Elisabeth Fuchs (Spain) Rosa Ortega |
| Kumite Open kg | (Italy) Roberta Minet | (Spain) Carmen Garcia | (France) Corrine Terrine (Germany) Nadine Ziemer |

==== Team ====
| Event | Gold | Silver | Bronze |
|---|---|---|---|
| Kata | Italy | Spain | France |
| Kumite | Spain | Italy | France; Turkey |
