= 1995 European Karate Championships =

Karate competition

- Location: Helsinki, Finland
- Dates: 21–23 May
- Competitors: 435 from 37 nations

The 1995 European Karate Championships, the 30th edition, was held in Helsinki, Finland from May 21 to 23, 1995.

== Medal table ==
* Host nation (Finland)

Rank	Nation	Gold	Silver	Bronze	Total
1	France	7	2	2	11
2	Italy	3	2	6	11
3	Finland*	3	0	4	7
4	Spain	1	5	5	11
5	England	1	3	1	5
6	Croatia	1	0	1	2
7	Slovakia	1	0	0	1
8	Turkey	0	1	4	5
9	Austria	0	1	1	2
9	Sweden	0	1	1	2
11	Belgium	0	1	0	1
11	Germany	0	1	0	1
13	Estonia	0	0	1	1
13	Hungary	0	0	1	1
13	Netherlands	0	0	1	1
13	Russia	0	0	1	1
13	Switzerland	0	0	1	1
Totals (17 entries)		17	17	30	64

== Competition ==
Event	Gold	Silver	Bronze
Kata	(France) Michaël Milon	(Spain) Luis-María Sanz	(Italy) Pasquale Acri
Kumite -60 kg	(France) Damien Dovy	(Turkey) Hakan Yağlı	(Sweden) Patrik Eriksson (Spain) David Luque Camacho
Kumite -65 kg	(France) Alexandre Biamonti	(Austria) Dragan Leiler	(Turkey) Bahattin Kandaz (Italy) Daniele Simmi
Kumite -70 kg	(Italy) Massimiliano Oggianu	(Sweden) Reza Mohseni	(France) Michael Braun (Finland) Harri Pakarinen
Kumite -75 kg	(England) Wayne Otto	(Italy) Gennaro Talarico	(Spain) Ricardo Cedillo (Estonia) Aleksandr Zokov
Kumite -80 kg	(Italy) Davide Benetello	(Belgium) Pascal Peeters	(Finland) Kim Waenerberg (Austria) George Petermann
Kumite + 80 kg	(Croatia) Enver Idrizi	(Spain) Oscar Olivares	(Switzerland) Reto Kern (Netherlands) Hans Roovers
Kumite Open	(France) Christophe Pinna	(Italy) David Lanna	(Russia) Andrey Anikin (Hungary) Balázs Hecker

=== Team ===
Event	Gold	Silver	Bronze
Kata	France	Spain	Italy
Kumite	France	England	Finland; Spain

=== Women's competition ===
==== Individual ====
Event	Gold	Silver	Bronze
Kata	(Slovakia) Marcela Remiášová	(Germany) Schahrzad Mansouri	(Italy) Cinzia Colaiacomo
Kumite -53 kg	(Italy) Michela Nanni	(England) Jillian Toney	(Croatia) Milica Aljinović (Finland) Sari Laine
Kumite -60 kg	(France) Sonia Pallin	(England) Julliet Toney	(Spain) Carmen Garcia (Turkey) Leyla Gedik
Kumite +60 kg	(Finland) Taru Tuulijärvi	(Spain) Rosa Ortega	(Turkey) Nurhan Fırat (France) Sophie Jean-Pierre
Kumite Open	(Finland) Sari Laine	(Spain) Rosa Ortega	(England) Patricia Duggin (Turkey) Nurhan Fırat

==== Team ====
Event	Gold	Silver	Bronze
Kata	Spain	France	Italy
Kumite	Finland	France	Italy; Spain
