= 1993 European Karate Championships =

Karate competition

- Location: Prague, Czech Republic
- Dates: 2–4 May
- Competitors: 480 from 33 nations

The 1993 European Karate Championships, the 28th edition, was held in Prague, Czech Republic from May 2 to 4, 1993.

== Medal table ==
* Host nation (Czech Republic)

Rank	Nation	Gold	Silver	Bronze	Total
1	Spain	5	2	1	8
2	France	4	0	6	10
3	Germany	2	2	4	8
4	Norway	2	0	0	2
5	Italy	1	4	6	11
6	Sweden	1	0	1	2
6	Turkey	1	0	1	2
8	Croatia	1	0	0	1
9	England	0	3	2	5
10	Finland	0	3	1	4
11	Austria	0	1	2	3
11	Scotland	0	1	2	3
13	Czech Republic*	0	1	0	1
14	Netherlands	0	0	2	2
15	Greece	0	0	1	1
15	Yugoslavia	0	0	1	1
Totals (16 entries)		17	17	30	64

== Medallists ==
=== Men's Competition ===
==== Individual ====
Event	Gold	Silver	Bronze
Kata	(Spain) Luis-María Sanz	(Italy) Pasquale Acri	(France) Laurent Riccio
Kumite -60 kg	(Spain) David Luque Camacho	(Italy) Daniele Simmi	(France) Damien Dovy (Scotland) Robert McCulloch
Kumite -65 kg	(Norway) Stein Rønning	(Germany) Murat Uysal	(Scotland) Scott Cunningham (Italy) Francesco Muffato
Kumite -70 kg	(Italy) Massimiliano Oggianu	(England) William Thomas	(France) Romain Anselmo (Germany) Samad Azadi
Kumite -75 kg	(Germany) Kosta Sariyannis	(Italy) Vincenzo Amicone	(Spain) Carlos Meana (England) Wayne Otto
Kumite -80 kg	(Norway) Morten Alstadsæther	(Scotland) Michael Gillan	(Germany) Thomas Nitschmann (Italy) Gennaro Talarico
Kumite +80 kg	(Croatia) Enver Idrizi	(England) Ian Cole	(Italy) David Benetello (Austria) Andreas Kleinekathöfer
Kumite Open	(France) Alain Lehetet	(Spain) Tomas Herrero Barcelo	(Sweden) Sacha Petrovic-Düner (Finland) Sami Tiainen

==== Team ====
Event	Gold	Silver	Bronze
Kata	France	Spain	Italy
Kumite	France	Finland	Germany; England

=== Women's competition ===
==== Individual ====
Event	Gold	Silver	Bronze
Kata	(Spain) Maite San Narciso	(Germany) Simone Schreiner	(Italy) Cinzia Colaiacomo
Kumite -53 kg	(France) Maryse Mazurier	(Finland) Sari Laine	(Netherlands) Ivonne Senff (Italy) Elena Tuccitto
Kumite -60 kg	(Germany) Sandra Schäfer	(Austria) Irene Lyel	(Socialist Federal Republic of Yugoslavia) Tatjana Petrovic (Turkey) Leyla Gedik
Kumite +60 kg	(Sweden) Karin Olsson	(Czech Republic) Jana Sykorova	(Greece) Theodora Dougeni (France) Sophie Jean Pierre
Kumite Open kg	(Turkey) Nurhan Fırat	(Finland) Sari Laine	(Germany) Anette Christl (Netherlands) Carla Hoitinga

==== Team ====
Event	Gold	Silver	Bronze
Kata	Spain	Italy	France
Kumite	Spain	England	Austria; France
