= 1996 European Karate Championships =

Karate competition

- Location: Paris, France
- Dates: 3–5 May
- Competitors: 461 from 36 nations

The 1996 European Karate Championships, the 31st edition, was held in Paris, France from May 3 to 5, 1996.

== Medal table ==
* Host nation (France)

Rank	Nation	Gold	Silver	Bronze	Total
1	France*	9	0	6	15
2	England	2	1	3	6
3	Italy	1	7	2	10
4	Spain	1	3	5	9
5	Finland	1	1	0	2
6	Netherlands	1	0	2	3
7	Norway	1	0	0	1
7	Slovakia	1	0	0	1
9	Germany	0	2	3	5
10	Turkey	0	1	4	5
11	Switzerland	0	1	2	3
12	Belgium	0	1	0	1
13	Denmark	0	0	1	1
13	Scotland	0	0	1	1
13	Yugoslavia	0	0	1	1
Totals (15 entries)		17	17	30	64

== Competition ==
Event	Gold	Silver	Bronze
Kata	(France) Michaël Milon	(Italy) Lucio Maurino	(Spain) Luis-María Sanz
Kumite -60 kg	(France) Damien Dovy	(Germany) Veysel Bugur	(France) Joel Barst (Denmark) Tommy Busk
Kumite -65 kg	(France) Alexandre Biamonti	(Turkey) Bahattin Kandaz	(Scotland) Steve Cunningham (Switzerland) Vincent Longagna
Kumite -70 kg	(Netherlands) Anthony Boelbaai	(Italy) Claudio della Rocca	(Turkey) Haldun Alagaş (Spain) Oscar Vázquez Martins
Kumite -75 kg	(England) Wayne Otto	(Italy) Gennaro Talarico	(Germany) Kosta Sariyannis (England) William Thomas
Kumite -80 kg	(France) Gilles Cherdieu	(Italy) David Benetello	(Spain) Tomas Herrero Barcelo (Socialist Federal Republic of Yugoslavia) Predrag Stojadinov
Kumite + 80 kg	(Norway) Jarle Sorken	(Netherlands) Hans Roovers	(Switzerland) Reto Kern (France) Serge Tomao
Kumite Open	(France) Christophe Pinna	(Switzerland) Sandro Petrillo	(Turkey) Levent Aydemir (England) Terry Daly

=== Team ===
Event	Gold	Silver	Bronze
Kata	France	Italy	Spain
Kumite	France	England	Germany; Netherlands

=== Women's competition ===
==== Individual ====
Event	Gold	Silver	Bronze
Kata	(Slovakia) Marcela Remiášová	(Spain) Gema Mendez	(France) Cathérine Bernard
Kumite -53 kg	(Finland) Sari Laine	(Italy) Roberta Sodero	(Spain) Maria Dolores Hoz (France) Nadia Mecheri
Kumite -60 kg	(France) Monique Amghar	(Spain) Sonia Gomez	(France) Sonia Pallin (England) Julliet Toney
Kumite +60 kg	(England) Janice Francis	(Germany) Annette Christl	(Turkey) Nurhan Fırat (Italy) Roberta Minet
Kumite Open	(Spain) Carmen Garcia	(Finland) Sari Laine	(Turkey) Yıldız Aras (Italy) Roberta Minet

==== Team ====
Event	Gold	Silver	Bronze
Kata	France	Italy	Germany
Kumite	Italy	Spain	France; Netherlands
