= 1994 European Karate Championships =

Karate competition

- Venue: National Indoor Arena
- Location: (United Kingdom) Birmingham, England
- Dates: 2–4 May
- Competitors: 373 from 34 nations

The 1994 European Karate Championships, the 29th edition, was held in the sports complex of the National Indoor Arena in Birmingham, England from May 2 to 4, 1994.

== Medal table ==
* Host nation (England)

Rank	Nation	Gold	Silver	Bronze	Total
1	France	7	5	2	14
2	Italy	4	3	6	13
3	Spain	3	3	4	10
4	England*	1	1	3	5
5	Turkey	1	1	0	2
6	Finland	1	0	1	2
7	Yugoslavia	0	2	0	2
8	Sweden	0	1	3	4
9	Croatia	0	1	0	1
10	Germany	0	0	3	3
10	Scotland	0	0	3	3
12	Austria	0	0	2	2
13	Russia	0	0	1	1
13	Slovakia	0	0	1	1
13	Switzerland	0	0	1	1
Totals (15 entries)		17	17	30	64

== Medallists ==
=== Men's competition ===
==== Individual ====
Event	Gold	Silver	Bronze
Kata	(France) Michaël Milon	(Spain) Luis-María Sanz	(Italy) Pasquale Acri
Kumite -60 kg	(Turkey) Hakan Yağlı	(Spain) David Luque Camacho	(France) Damien Dovy (Sweden) Patrik Eriksson
Kumite -65 kg	(France) Michaël Braun	(England) Tim Stephens	(Scotland) Scott Cunningham (Italy) Daniele Simmi
Kumite -70 kg	(France) Romain Anselmo	(Turkey) Aytekin Soykan	(Germany) Samad Azadi (France) Alain Varo
Kumite -75 kg	(England) Wayne Otto	(Italy) Gennaro Talarico	(Austria) Daniel Devigli (Italy) Massimiliano Oggianu
Kumite -80 kg	(France) Gilles Cherdieu	(Italy) Davide Benetello	(Sweden) Gabriel Berg (Spain) Carlos Meana
Kumite +80 kg	(Spain) Oscar Olivares	(Socialist Federal Republic of Yugoslavia) Vladimir Jokovic	(Scotland) John Roddie (Italy) Luigi Salzillo
Kumite Open	(Italy) Claudio Della Rocca	(Croatia) Enver Idrizi	(Austria) George Petermann (Slovakia) Ján Stupka

==== Team ====
Event	Gold	Silver	Bronze
Kata	France	Italy	Spain
Kumite	Italy	France	England; Switzerland

=== Women's competition ===
==== Individual ====
Event	Gold	Silver	Bronze
Kata	(Italy) Cinzia Colajacomo	(France) Nadia Dumont	(Germany) Schahrzad Mansouri
Kumite -53 kg	(Finland) Sari Laine	(France) Maryse Mazurier	(Italy) Elena Tuccitto (England) Julliet Toney
Kumite -60 kg	(Italy) Chiara Stella Bux	(Socialist Federal Republic of Yugoslavia) Tatjana Petrovic	(Spain) Carmen García (Russia) Larissa Karatounova
Kumite +60 kg	(France) Sophie Jean-Pierre	(Spain) Rosa Ortega	(Scotland) Kirsty Coulter (Sweden) Karin Olsson
Kumite Open	(Spain) Consuelo Hernández	(France) Nathalie Beniot	(England) Patricia Duggin (Finland) Sari Laine

==== Team ====
Event	Gold	Silver	Bronze
Kata	Spain	France	Germany
Kumite	France	Sweden	Italy; Spain
