= 1992 World Karate Championships =

Karate competition

- Host city: Granada, Spain
- Dates: 19–22 November
- Main venue: Palacio Municipal de Deportes

The 1992 World Karate Championships are the 11th edition of the World Karate Championships, and were held in Granada, Spain from November 19 to November 22, 1992.

== Medalists ==
=== Men ===
Event	Gold	Silver	Bronze
Individual kata	Luis María Sanz; Spain	Ryoki Abe; Japan	Laurent Riccio; France
Team kata	Japan	Spain	France
Kumite −60 kg	Veysel Buğur; Turkey	David Luque; Spain	Norimassa Fujita; Japan
Kumite −60 kg	Veysel Buğur; Turkey	David Luque; Spain	Damien Dovy; France
Kumite −65 kg	Jesús Juan Rubio; Spain	Bahattin Kandaz; Turkey	Janne Timonen; Finland
Kumite −65 kg	Jesús Juan Rubio; Spain	Bahattin Kandaz; Turkey	Murat Uysal; Germany
Kumite −70 kg	William Thomas; Great Britain	Junichi Watanabe; Japan	Ronny Rivano; Netherlands
Kumite −70 kg	William Thomas; Great Britain	Junichi Watanabe; Japan	Massimiliano Oggianu; Italy
Kumite −75 kg	Wayne Otto; Great Britain	Jørn-Ove Hansen; Norway	Berthold Bürkle; Germany
Kumite −75 kg	Wayne Otto; Great Britain	Jørn-Ove Hansen; Norway	Tomás Herrero; Spain
Kumite −80 kg	José Manuel Egea; Spain	Miroslav Gachulinec; Czechoslovakia	Dudley Josepa; Curaçao
Kumite −80 kg	José Manuel Egea; Spain	Miroslav Gachulinec; Czechoslovakia	Christophe Pinna; France
Kumite +80 kg	Brian Peakall; Australia	Serge Tomao; France	Juan Hernández; Spain
Kumite +80 kg	Brian Peakall; Australia	Serge Tomao; France	Hans Roovers; Netherlands
Kumite open ippon	Akira Hayashi; Japan	None awarded	Toni Dietl; Germany
Kumite open ippon	Akira Hayashi; Japan	None awarded	None awarded
Team kumite	Spain	Sweden	Japan
Team kumite	Spain	Sweden	France

=== Women ===
Event	Gold	Silver	Bronze
Individual kata	Yuki Mimura; Japan	Melanie Genung; United States	Maite San Narciso; Spain
Team kata	Japan	United States	Spain
Kumite −53 kg	Charlene Machin; Australia	Jillian Toney; Great Britain	Özgür Yaman; Turkey
Kumite −53 kg	Charlene Machin; Australia	Jillian Toney; Great Britain	Marise Mazurier; France
Kumite −60 kg	Molly Samuel; Great Britain	Chiara Stella Bux; Italy	Tanja Petrović; Yugoslavia
Kumite −60 kg	Molly Samuel; Great Britain	Chiara Stella Bux; Italy	Carmen García; Spain
Kumite +60 kg	Catherine Belrhiti; France	Nurhan Fırat; Turkey	Silvia Wiegärtner; Germany
Kumite +60 kg	Catherine Belrhiti; France	Nurhan Fırat; Turkey	Yukiko Yoneda; Japan
Team kumite	Great Britain	Netherlands	France
Team kumite	Great Britain	Netherlands	Italy

== Medal table ==
Rank	Nation	Gold	Silver	Bronze	Total
1	Spain	4	2	5	11
2	Japan	4	2	3	9
3	Great Britain	4	1	0	5
4	Australia	2	0	0	2
5	Turkey	1	2	1	4
6	France	1	1	7	9
7	United States	0	2	0	2
8	Italy	0	1	2	3
8	Netherlands	0	1	2	3
10	Czechoslovakia	0	1	0	1
10	Norway	0	1	0	1
10	Sweden	0	1	0	1
13	Germany	0	0	4	4
14	Curaçao	0	0	1	1
14	Finland	0	0	1	1
14	Yugoslavia	0	0	1	1
Totals (16 entries)		16	15	27	58

- Athletes from Yugoslavia competed as Independent Participants and under Olympic flag.
