= 1991 European Karate Championships =

Karate competition

- Location: Hannover, Germany
- Dates: 2–4 May
- Competitors: 349 from 32 nations

The 1991 European Karate Championships, the 26th edition, was held Hannover, Germany from May 2 to 4, 1991.

== Medal table ==
* Host nation (Germany)

Rank	Nation	Gold	Silver	Bronze	Total
1	Spain	6	5	5	16
2	France	3	2	4	9
3	England	3	2	3	8
4	Scotland	2	1	3	6
5	Germany*	1	1	3	5
5	Turkey	1	1	3	5
7	Netherlands	1	0	3	4
8	Finland	1	0	0	1
9	Switzerland	0	2	0	2
10	Italy	0	1	4	5
11	Sweden	0	1	1	2
12	Bosnia and Herzegovina	0	1	0	1
12	Norway	0	1	0	1
14	Yugoslavia	0	0	2	2
15	Austria	0	0	1	1
Totals (15 entries)		18	18	32	68

== Medallists ==
=== Men's Competition ===
==== Individual ====
Event	Gold	Silver	Bronze
Kata	(Spain) Luis Maria Sanz	(Italy) Pasquale Acri	(Scotland) Steven Morris
Kumite -60 kg	(Spain) Juan Gomez	(Switzerland) Dominique Sigillo	(Netherlands) Tjoemann Chang (Spain) David Luque Camacho
Kumite -65 kg	(England) Tim Stephens	(Norway) Stein Ronning	(Scotland) Scott Cunningham (Turkey) Bahattin Kandaz
Kumite -70 kg	(Turkey) Haldun Alagaş	(Spain) Sergio Martínez	(Italy) Achille Degli Abbati (Netherlands) Ronny Rivano
Kumite -75 kg	(Spain) Fernando Blanco	(Switzerland) Djim Doula	(Netherlands) Anthoney Leito (Spain) Jose Maria de Dios
Kumite -80 kg	(England) Mervyn Etienne	(Sweden) Thomas Hallman	(France) Gilles Cherdieu (Germany) Jürgen Möldner
Kumite +80 kg	(Scotland) John Roddie	(Spain) Fernando Luis Garcia	(Germany) Ralf Brachmann (Sweden) Sacha Petrovic-Düner
Kumite Sanbon	(England) Wayne Otto	(Turkey) Sedat Cengiz	(Italy) Vincenzo Amicone (France) Jean Francois Gomis
Ippon Kumite	(Netherlands) Kemal Aktepe	(France) Giovanni Tramontini	(Austria) Andreas Kleinekathöfer (Spain) Jesús Juan Rubio

==== Team ====
Event	Gold	Silver	Bronze
Kata	France	Spain	Germany
Kumite	Spain	England	Scotland; France

=== Women's competition ===
==== Individual ====
Event	Gold	Silver	Bronze
Kata	(Germany) Simone Schreiner	(Spain) Ana San Narciso	(Spain) Maite San Narciso
Kumite -53 kg	(Finland) Sari Laine	(Scotland) Veronica Penman	(Spain) Eva Maria Chamarro (France) Maryse Mazurier
Kumite -60 kg	(Scotland) Edith McCord	(Spain) Carmen Garcia	(England) Molly Samuel (England) Janice Francis
Kumite +60 kg	(France) Catherine Belrhiti	(West Germany) Silvia Wiegärtner	(Turkey) Nurhan Fırat (Socialist Federal Republic of Yugoslavia) Olivera Šimić
Kumite Open	Spain	Bosnia and Herzegovina	(England) Patricia Duggin (Socialist Federal Republic of Yugoslavia) Biljana Stojovic

==== Team ====
Event	Gold	Silver	Bronze
Kata	Spain	France	Italy
Kumite	France	England	Italy; Turkey
