= 1994 World Karate Championships =

Karate competition

- Host city: Kota Kinabalu, Malaysia
- Dates: 8–11 December

The 1994 World Karate Championships are the 12th edition of the World Karate Championships, and were held in Kota Kinabalu, Malaysia from December 8 to December 11, 1994.

== Medalists ==
=== Men ===
Event	Gold	Silver	Bronze
Individual kata	Michaël Milon; France	Ryoki Abe; Japan	Luis María Sanz; Spain
Team kata	Japan	France	Peru
Kumite −60 kg	Damien Dovy; France	Hakan Yağlı; Turkey	Mehdi Amouzadeh; Iran
Kumite −60 kg	Damien Dovy; France	Hakan Yağlı; Turkey	Enrique Azarcon; Philippines
Kumite −65 kg	Teruchika Ito; Japan	Daniele Simmi; Italy	Mark Golding; Australia
Kumite −65 kg	Teruchika Ito; Japan	Daniele Simmi; Italy	Michaël Braun; France
Kumite −70 kg	Shizuo Shiina; Japan	Romain Anselmo; France	Samad Azadi; Germany
Kumite −70 kg	Shizuo Shiina; Japan	Romain Anselmo; France	Klemen Stanovnik; Slovenia
Kumite −75 kg	Daniel Devigili; Austria	Kosta Sariyannis; Germany	Junichi Watanabe; Japan
Kumite −75 kg	Daniel Devigili; Austria	Kosta Sariyannis; Germany	Mikko Ruotsalainen; Finland
Kumite −80 kg	Davide Benetello; Italy	Dudley Josepa; Netherlands Antilles	Gabriel Berg; Sweden
Kumite −80 kg	Davide Benetello; Italy	Dudley Josepa; Netherlands Antilles	Gilles Cherdieu; France
Kumite +80 kg	Alain Le Hétet; France	Yasumasa Shimizu; Japan	Sedat Cengiz; Turkey
Kumite +80 kg	Alain Le Hétet; France	Yasumasa Shimizu; Japan	Fernando García; Spain
Kumite open	Manabu Takenouchi; Japan	Enver Idrizi; Croatia	Christophe Pinna; France
Kumite open	Manabu Takenouchi; Japan	Enver Idrizi; Croatia	Óscar Olivares; Spain
Team kumite	France	Great Britain	Finland
Team kumite	France	Great Britain	Netherlands Antilles

=== Women ===
Event	Gold	Silver	Bronze
Individual kata	Hisami Yokoyama; Japan	Cinzia Colaiacomo; Italy	Danielle Lamond; Australia
Team kata	Japan	Italy	Spain
Kumite −53 kg	Sari Laine; Finland	Jillian Toney; Great Britain	Hiromi Hasama; Japan
Kumite −53 kg	Sari Laine; Finland	Jillian Toney; Great Britain	Robyn Choi; Australia
Kumite −60 kg	Mayumi Baba; Japan	Monique Amghar; France	Carmen García; Spain
Kumite −60 kg	Mayumi Baba; Japan	Monique Amghar; France	Leyla Gedik; Turkey
Kumite +60 kg	Sandra Louw; South Africa	Lourene Bevaart; Australia	Nurhan Fırat; Turkey
Kumite +60 kg	Sandra Louw; South Africa	Lourene Bevaart; Australia	Rosa Ortega; Spain
Team kumite	Spain	Great Britain	France
Team kumite	Spain	Great Britain	Brazil

== Medal table ==
Rank	Nation	Gold	Silver	Bronze	Total
1	Japan	7	2	2	11
2	France	4	3	4	11
3	Italy	1	3	0	4
4	Spain	1	0	6	7
5	Finland	1	0	2	3
6	Austria	1	0	0	1
6	South Africa	1	0	0	1
8	Great Britain	0	3	0	3
9	Australia	0	1	3	4
9	Turkey	0	1	3	4
11	Germany	0	1	1	2
11	Netherlands Antilles	0	1	1	2
13	Croatia	0	1	0	1
14	Brazil	0	0	1	1
14	Iran	0	0	1	1
14	Peru	0	0	1	1
14	Philippines	0	0	1	1
14	Slovenia	0	0	1	1
14	Sweden	0	0	1	1
Totals (19 entries)		16	16	28	60
