= 1999 European Karate Championships =

Karate competition

- Location: Chalcis, Greece
- Dates: 21–23 May

The 1999 European Karate Championships, the 34th edition, was held in Chalcis, Greece from May 21 to 23, 1999.

== Medal table ==
* Host nation (Greece)

Rank	Nation	Gold	Silver	Bronze	Total
1	France	4	6	4	14
2	Spain	4	1	3	8
3	Italy	3	3	2	8
4	Turkey	2	2	4	8
5	Croatia	2	0	1	3
6	Germany	1	2	2	5
7	England	1	0	0	1
8	Yugoslavia	0	1	2	3
9	Finland	0	1	1	2
10	Bosnia and Herzegovina	0	1	0	1
11	Netherlands	0	0	3	3
12	Slovakia	0	0	2	2
13	Azerbaijan	0	0	1	1
13	Bulgaria	0	0	1	1
13	Greece*	0	0	1	1
13	Norway	0	0	1	1
13	Russia	0	0	1	1
13	Sweden	0	0	1	1
Totals (18 entries)		17	17	30	64

== Medallists ==
=== Men's competition ===
==== Individual ====
Event	Gold	Silver	Bronze
Kata	(Spain) Javier Hernández Alonso	(Italy) Lucio Maurino	(France) Stéphane Mari
Kumite -60 kg	(Spain) David Luque Camacho	(Finland) Petri Toivanen	(France) Joël Barst (Bulgaria) Borislav Ivanov
Kumite -65 kg	(France) Alexandre Biamonti	(France) Soufiane Sankhon	(Azerbaijan) Rashad Huseynov (Spain) Angel Ramiro Molina
Kumite -70 kg	(Croatia) Junior Lefevre	(France) Robert Gomis	(Netherlands) Anthony Boelbaai (Spain) Óscar Vázquez Martins
Kumite -75 kg	(Italy) Gennaro Talarico	(Turkey) Yavuz Karamollaoğlu	(Russia) Islamoutdin Eldarouchev (Slovakia) Klaudio Farmadin
Kumite -80 kg	(Turkey) Zeynel Çelik	(Germany) Fadi Chaabo	(Socialist Federal Republic of Yugoslavia) Dragan Miranović (Netherlands) Daniël Sabanovic
Kumite +80 kg	(England) Wayne Otto	(France) Seydina Balde	(Turkey) İbrahim Erçin (Norway) Jarle Sorken
Kumite Open	(Croatia) Junior Lefevre	(Socialist Federal Republic of Yugoslavia) Predrag Stojadinov	(Turkey) Zeynel Çelik (Slovakia) Klaudio Farmadin

==== Team ====
Event	Gold	Silver	Bronze
Kata	Spain	France	Italy
Kumite	France	Bosnia and Herzegovina	Netherlands; Germany

=== Women's competition ===
==== Individual ====
Event	Gold	Silver	Bronze
Kata	(Italy) Roberta Sodero	(Spain) Miriam Cogolludo de la Herras	(France) Myriam Szkudlarek
Kumite -53 kg	(France) Nadia Mecheri	(France) Corinne Terrine	(Turkey) Gülderen Çelik (Finland) Sari Laine
Kumite -60 kg	(Italy) Chiara Stella Bux	(Germany) Alexandra Witteborn	(Turkey) Leyla Gedik (Socialist Federal Republic of Yugoslavia) Snežana Perić
Kumite +60 kg	(France) Laurence Fischer	(Spain) Gloria Casanova Rodriguez	(Greece) Theodora Dougeni (Italy) Sara Ferrone
Kumite Open	(Germany) Nadine Ziemer	(Turkey) Nurhan Fırat	(Sweden) Lotta Berger (Croatia) Lea Iskra

==== Team ====
Event	Gold	Silver	Bronze
Kata	Spain	Italy	France
Kumite	Turkey	Italy	Germany; France
