= 1998 European Karate Championships =

Karate competition

- Location: Belgrade, Serbia and Montenegro
- Dates: 8–10 May

The 1998 European Karate Championships, the 33rd edition, was held in Belgrade, Serbia and Montenegro from May 8 to 10, 1998.

== Medal table ==
* Host nation (Serbia and Montenegro)

Rank	Nation	Gold	Silver	Bronze	Total
1	France	5	1	10	16
2	Italy	3	5	4	12
3	Spain	3	2	3	8
4	Serbia and Montenegro	3	2	2	7
5	England	1	2	2	5
6	Turkey	1	1	7	9
7	Belgium	1	0	1	2
8	Slovenia	0	2	0	2
9	Finland	0	1	1	2
10	Sweden	0	1	0	1
Totals (10 entries)		17	17	30	64

== Competition ==
Event	Gold	Silver	Bronze
Kata	(Spain) Javier Hernández	(Italy) Lucio Maurino	(France) Yves Bardreau
Kumite -60 kg	(Turkey) Hakan Yağlı	(Slovenia) Damir Vrbanic	(England) Jason Ledgister (Spain) David Luque Camacho
Kumite -65 kg	(France) Alexandre Biamonti	(Socialist Federal Republic of Yugoslavia) Drasko Stojanovic	(Turkey) Bahattin Kandaz (France) Soufiane Sankhon
Kumite -70 kg	(Belgium) Junior Lefevre	(Sweden) Resa Mohseni	(Turkey) Haldun Alagaş (Socialist Federal Republic of Yugoslavia) Aleksandar Sindelic
Kumite -75 kg	(Italy) Gennaro Talarico	(Italy) Salvatore Loria	(France) Michaël Braun (Spain) Tomas Herrero Barcelo
Kumite -80 kg	(France) Gilles Cherdieu	(Socialist Federal Republic of Yugoslavia) Predrag Stojadinov	(France) Yann Baillon (Turkey) Zeynel Çelik
Kumite + 80 kg	(Socialist Federal Republic of Yugoslavia) Teodor Rajić	(England) Ian Cole	(Turkey) Okay Arpa (France) Seydina Balde
Open Kumite	(Italy) Salvatore Loria	(Turkey) Zeynel Çelik	(Germany) Andreas Horn (France) Seci Mecheri

=== Team ===
Event	Gold	Silver	Bronze
Kata	Spain	Italy	France
Kumite	England	Italy	France; Yugoslavia

=== Women's competition ===
==== Individual ====
Event	Gold	Silver	Bronze
Kata	(Italy) Roberta Sodero	(France) Myriam Szkudlarek	(Spain) Gema Mendez
Kumite -53 kg	(France) Nadia Mecheri	(Slovakia) Marianna Laukova	(Italy) Michela Nanni (Finland) Sari Laine
Kumite -60 kg	(Socialist Federal Republic of Yugoslavia) Roksanda Lasarevic	(Spain) Beatriz Pérez	(Italy) Chiara Stella Bux (England) Jillian Toney
Kumite +60 kg	(Socialist Federal Republic of Yugoslavia) Slađana Mitić	(England) Patricia Duggin	(France) Laurence Fischer (Turkey) Nurhan Fırat
Kumite Open kg	(Italy) Roberta Minet	(Finland) Sari Laine	(Italy) Chiara Stella Bux (Turkey) Nurhan Fırat

==== Team ====
Event	Gold	Silver	Bronze
Kata	France	Spain	Italy
Kumite	Spain	Italy	France; Turkey
