= 1988 European Karate Championships =

Karate competition

- Location: Genoa, Italy
- Dates: 11–13 May
- Competitors: 350 from 22 nations

The 1988 European Karate Championships, the 23rd edition, was held in Genoa, Italy from May 11 to 13, 1988.

== Medal table ==
* Host nation (Italy)

Rank	Nation	Gold	Silver	Bronze	Total
1	Italy*	5	3	3	11
2	Spain	2	3	7	12
3	France	2	3	6	11
4	Norway	2	0	1	3
5	Great Britain	1	3	5	9
6	Netherlands	1	3	2	6
7	Sweden	1	2	1	4
8	Scotland	1	0	2	3
9	Finland	1	0	1	2
10	West Germany	1	0	0	1
11	Cyprus	0	0	1	1
11	Turkey	0	0	1	1
Totals (12 entries)		17	17	30	64

== Medallists ==
=== Men's Competition ===
==== Individual ====
Event	Gold	Silver	Bronze
Kata	(Italy) Dario Marchini	(Spain) Luis-María Sanz	(Scotland) Steve Morris
Kumite -60 kg	(Norway) Stein Rønning	(United Kingdom) Leslie Fairclough	(Spain) Evaristo Criado (France) Damien Dovy
Kumite -65 kg	(Italy) Francesco Muffato	(United Kingdom) Frank Lee-Sang	(Netherlands) Reginaldo Doran (Spain) Jesús Juan Rubio
Kumite -70 kg	(United Kingdom) Wayne Otto	(Netherlands) Ali Aktepe	(Italy) Achille Degli Abbati (France) Thierry Masci
Kumite -75 kg	(Scotland) Thomas Gibson	(Netherlands) Kenneth Leeuwin	(France) Paul Giacinti (Cyprus) Pavlo Protopapa
Kumite -80 kg	(Spain) José Manuel Egea	(Netherlands) Dudley Josepa	(Italy) Gianluca Guazzaroni (France) Claude Pettinella
Kumite +80 kg	(France) Marc Pyrée	(France) Emmanuel Pinda	(Spain) Jose Hernandez (Norway) Erik Hjerpåsen
Kumite Sanbon	(Sweden) Karl Daggfeldt	(Spain) José Manuel Egea	(United Kingdom) Ian Cole (United Kingdom) Mike Sailsman
Kumite Ippon	(West Germany) Jörg Reuß	(France) Giovanni Tramontini	(Italy) Andrea Lentini (Turkey) Veysel Buğur

==== Team ====
Event	Gold	Silver	Bronze
Kata	Italy	Spain	France
Kumite	Norway	Italy	United Kingdom; Scotland

=== Women's competition ===
==== Individual ====
Event	Gold	Silver	Bronze
Kata	(Italy) Cristina Restelli	(Sweden) Lena Svensson	(Spain) Marisa Rozalen
Kumite -53 kg	(France) Catherine Girardet	(Italy) Anna Di Cesare	(Finland) Sari Laine (Spain) Visitacion Garces
Kumite -60 kg	(Spain) Yolanda Dutrey	(Italy) Loredana Montacchiesi	(United Kingdom) Annette Bailey (United Kingdom) Molly Samuels
Kumite +60 kg	(Netherlands) Guus van Mourik	(United Kingdom) Diane Reilly	(Spain) Manuela Garcia (Sweden) Karin Sökare

==== Team ====
Event	Gold	Silver	Bronze
Kata	Italy	France	Spain
Kumite	Finland	Sweden	France; Netherlands
