= 1996 World Karate Championships =

Karate competition

- Host city: Sun City, South Africa
- Dates: 7–11 November

The 1996 World Karate Championships are the 13th edition of the World Karate Championships, and were held in Sun City, South Africa from 7 to 11 November 1996.

== Medalists ==
=== Men ===
Event	Gold	Silver	Bronze
Individual kata	Michaël Milon; France	Ryoki Abe; Japan	Lucio Maurino; Italy
Team kata	Japan	France	Italy
Kumite −60 kg	David Luque; Spain	Hakan Yağlı; Turkey	Shinichiro Yamamoto; Japan
Kumite −60 kg	David Luque; Spain	Hakan Yağlı; Turkey	Rifat Mujanović; Yugoslavia
Kumite −65 kg	Mehdi Amouzadeh; Iran	Mark Golding; Australia	Alexandre Biamonti; France
Kumite −65 kg	Mehdi Amouzadeh; Iran	Mark Golding; Australia	Bahattin Kandaz; Turkey
Kumite −70 kg	Aslan Gubashiev; Russia	Juraj Gažo; Slovakia	Reza Mohseni; Sweden
Kumite −70 kg	Aslan Gubashiev; Russia	Juraj Gažo; Slovakia	Junior Lefevre; Belgium
Kumite −75 kg	Wayne Otto; Great Britain	Tomás Herrero; Spain	Kazuaki Matsumoto; Japan
Kumite −75 kg	Wayne Otto; Great Britain	Tomás Herrero; Spain	Gennaro Talarico; Italy
Kumite −80 kg	Gilles Cherdieu; France	Toshihito Kokubun; Japan	Georg Petermann; Austria
Kumite −80 kg	Gilles Cherdieu; France	Toshihito Kokubun; Japan	Fernando García; Spain
Kumite +80 kg	Yasumasa Shimizu; Japan	Andrey Anikin; Russia	Teodor Rajić; Yugoslavia
Kumite +80 kg	Yasumasa Shimizu; Japan	Andrey Anikin; Russia	Ian Cole; Great Britain
Kumite open	Paul Alderson; Great Britain	Óscar Olivares; Spain	John Fonseca; United States
Kumite open	Paul Alderson; Great Britain	Óscar Olivares; Spain	Manabu Takenouchi; Japan
Team kumite	France	Great Britain	Yugoslavia
Team kumite	France	Great Britain	Spain

=== Women ===
Event	Gold	Silver	Bronze
Individual kata	Yuki Mimura; Japan	Melanie Genung; United States	Shahrzad Mansouri; Germany
Team kata	Japan	United States	France
Kumite −53 kg	Theresia Larsson; Sweden	Marise Mazurier; France	Marianna Lauková; Slovakia
Kumite −53 kg	Theresia Larsson; Sweden	Marise Mazurier; France	Robyn Choi; Australia
Kumite −60 kg	Julliet Toney; Great Britain	Mayumi Baba; Japan	Chiara Stella Bux; Italy
Kumite −60 kg	Julliet Toney; Great Britain	Mayumi Baba; Japan	Leyla Gedik; Turkey
Kumite +60 kg	Patricia Duggin; Great Britain	Theodora Dougeni; Greece	Rosa Ortega; Spain
Kumite +60 kg	Patricia Duggin; Great Britain	Theodora Dougeni; Greece	Bregje Kaars-Sijpestein; Netherlands
Kumite open	Yvonne Senff; Netherlands Antilles	Izumi Nabeki; Japan	Karina Gansch; Austria
Kumite open	Yvonne Senff; Netherlands Antilles	Izumi Nabeki; Japan	Roberta Minet; Italy
Team kumite	Great Britain	Italy	Spain
Team kumite	Great Britain	Italy	Australia

== Medal table ==
Rank	Nation	Gold	Silver	Bronze	Total
1	Great Britain	5	1	1	7
2	Japan	4	4	3	11
3	France	3	2	2	7
4	Spain	1	2	4	7
5	Russia	1	1	0	2
6	Sweden	1	0	1	2
7	Iran	1	0	0	1
7	Netherlands Antilles	1	0	0	1
9	United States	0	2	1	3
10	Italy	0	1	5	6
11	Australia	0	1	2	3
11	Turkey	0	1	2	3
13	Slovakia	0	1	1	2
14	Greece	0	1	0	1
15	Yugoslavia	0	0	3	3
16	Austria	0	0	2	2
17	Belgium	0	0	1	1
17	Germany	0	0	1	1
17	Netherlands	0	0	1	1
Totals (19 entries)		17	17	30	64
