= 2000 European Karate Championships =

Karate competition

- Location: Istanbul, Turkey
- Dates: 2–4 May

The 2000 European Karate Championships, the 35th edition, was held in Istanbul, Turkey from May 2 to 4, 2000.

== Medal table ==
* Host nation (Turkey)

Rank	Nation	Gold	Silver	Bronze	Total
1	France	8	2	7	17
2	Italy	3	4	1	8
3	Spain	2	3	5	10
4	Turkey*	2	3	4	9
5	England	1	1	1	3
5	Yugoslavia	1	1	1	3
7	Sweden	0	2	0	2
8	Austria	0	1	1	2
9	Czech Republic	0	0	2	2
9	Netherlands	0	0	2	2
11	Bosnia and Herzegovina	0	0	1	1
11	Croatia	0	0	1	1
11	Germany	0	0	1	1
11	Greece	0	0	1	1
11	Russia	0	0	1	1
11	Slovakia	0	0	1	1
Totals (16 entries)		17	17	30	64

== Medallists ==
=== Men's Competition ===
==== Individual ====
Event	Gold	Silver	Bronze
Kata	(Italy) Luca Valdesi	(Spain) Javier Hernández	(France) Stephane Mari
Kumite -60 kg	(France) Cécil Boulesnane	(Turkey) Hakan Yağlı	(Czech Republic) Ales Bruna (Spain) David Luque Camacho
Kumite -65 kg	(France) Alexandre Biamonti	(Sweden) Hassan Abou El Alamein	(Turkey) Bahattin Kandaz (France) Soufiane Sankhon
Kumite -70 kg	(Turkey) Haldun Alagaş	(France) Rida Bel Lahsen	(Croatia) Junior Lefevre (Socialist Federal Republic of Yugoslavia) Z. Stojovic
Kumite -75 kg	(Spain) Iván Leal Reglero	(Italy) Gennaro Talarico	(Slovakia) Klaudio Farmadin (Russia) Rouslan Sijajev
Kumite -80 kg	(France) Yann Baillon	(Turkey) Zeynel Çelik	(Spain) Alejandro Arniaz (Netherlands) Daniël Sabanovich
Kumite +80 kg	(Italy) Davide Benetello	(Turkey) Okay Arpa	(France) Seydina Balde (Austria) Georg Petermann
Kumite Open	(Socialist Federal Republic of Yugoslavia) Predrag Stojadinov	(Spain) Oscar Vazquez Martins	(Greece) Konstantinos Papadopoulos (France) Christophe Pinna

==== Team ====
Event	Gold	Silver	Bronze
Kata	Spain	Italy	France
Kumite	France	England	Bosnia and Herzegovina; Italy

=== Women's competition ===
==== Individual ====
Event	Gold	Silver	Bronze
Kata	(Italy) Roberta Sodero	(France) Myriam Szkudlarek	(Spain) Miriam Cogolludo de la Herras
Kumite -53 kg	(France) Nadia Mecheri	(Italy) Michela Nanni	(Turkey) Nilüfer Gönenler (France) Corinne Terrine
Kumite -60 kg	(France) Patricia Chereau	(Spain) Sonia Gomez	(Netherlands) Carla Hoitinga (Turkey) Nurhan Fırat
Kumite +60 kg	(England) Katrina Lowe	(Sweden) Lotta Berger	(Spain) Gloria Casanova Rodriguez (Germany) Alexandra Witteborn
Kumite Open	(Turkey) Yıldız Aras	(Austria) Karina Gansch	(France) Nathalie Leroy (Czech Republic) Petra Piskačová

==== Team ====
Event	Gold	Silver	Bronze
Kata	France	Italy	Spain
Kumite	France	Yugoslavia	Turkey; England
