= 1992 European Karate Championships =

Karate competition

- Location: Den Bosch, Netherlands
- Dates: 5–7 May
- Competitors: 420 from 32 nations

The 1992 European Karate Championships were held in Den Bosch, Netherlands from May 5 to 7, 1992, making it 27th edition of the event.

== Medal table ==
* Host nation (Netherlands)

Rank	Nation	Gold	Silver	Bronze	Total
1	Spain	5	2	3	10
2	France	3	3	5	11
3	England	3	2	2	7
4	Germany	2	4	2	8
5	Finland	2	0	0	2
6	Netherlands*	1	1	3	5
7	Norway	1	1	0	2
8	Italy	0	2	8	10
9	Turkey	0	1	2	3
10	Croatia	0	1	0	1
11	Czech Republic	0	0	1	1
11	Hungary	0	0	1	1
11	Sweden	0	0	1	1
11	Switzerland	0	0	1	1
11	Yugoslavia	0	0	1	1
Totals (15 entries)		17	17	30	64

== Competition ==
Event	Gold	Silver	Bronze
Kata kg	(Spain) Luis Maria Sanz	(Italy) Pasquale Acri	(France) Laurent Riccio
Kumite -60 kg	(France) Damien Dovy	(Norway) Tommy Gabrielsen	(Switzerland) Dominique Sigillo (Italy) Nicola Simmi
Kumite -65 kg	(Spain) Jesus Juan Rubio	(Germany) Murat Uysal	(Italy) Francesco Muffato (Netherlands) Jeffrey Snel
Kumite -70 kg	(Netherlands) Ronny Rivano	(France) Romaine Anselmo	(Turkey) Haldun Alagaş (Italy) Achille Degli Abbati
Kumite -75 kg	(Spain) Thomas Herrero	(England) Paul Augustus	(Netherlands) Anthony Leito (Socialist Federal Republic of Yugoslavia) Z.Todorovic
Kumite -80 kg	(Norway) Morten Alstadsæther	(Germany) Waldemar Rauch	(Spain) Serafin Blanco Granes (Italy) Gianluca Guazzaroni
Kumite + 80 kg	(France) Serge Tomao	(Croatia) Enver Idrizi	(Spain) Fernando Luis Garcia (Italy) Claudio Guazzaroni
Kumite Open	(Germany) Toni Dietl	(England) Keith Morton	(Netherlands) Kemal Aktepe (France) Giovanni Tramontini

=== Team ===
Event	Gold	Silver	Bronze
Kata	France	Spain	Italy
Kumite	England	France	Germany; Spain

=== Women's Competition ===
==== Individual ====
Event	Gold	Silver	Bronze
Kata	(Spain) Maite San Narciso	(Germany) Simone Schreiner	(Sweden) Lena Pyree
Kumite -53 kg	(Finland) Sari Laine	(Netherlands) Ivonne Senff	(France) Marise Mazurier (Italy) Elena Tuccitto
Kumite -60 kg	(England) Molly Samuel	(Turkey) Leyla Gedik	(France) Monique Amghar (Hungary) Pálma Diósi
Kumite +60 kg	(Germany) Silvia Wiegaertner	(France) Marie-Ange Legros	(Turkey) Nurhan Fırat (England) Diane Reilly
Kumite Open	(Finland) Sari Laine	(Germany) Annette Christl	(England) Janice Francis (Czechoslovakia) Jana Sýkorová

==== Team ====
Event	Gold	Silver	Bronze
Kata	Spain	Italy	France
Kumite	England	Spain	Italy; Germany
