= 1990 World Karate Championships =

Karate competition

- Host city: Mexico City, Mexico
- Dates: 8–11 November

The 1990 World Karate Championships are the 10th edition of the World Karate Championships, and were held in Mexico City, Mexico from November 8 to November 11, 1990.

== Medalists ==
=== Men ===
Event	Gold	Silver	Bronze
Individual kata	Tomoyuki Aihara; Japan	Dario Marchini; Italy	Luis María Sanz; Spain
Team kata	Italy	Japan	France
Kumite −60 kg	Stein Rønning; Norway	Hideto Nakano; Japan	Hakan Yağlı; Turkey
Kumite −60 kg	Stein Rønning; Norway	Hideto Nakano; Japan	Veysel Buğur; Turkey
Kumite −65 kg	Toshikatsu Azumi; Japan	Goran Romić; Yugoslavia	Bahattin Kandaz; Turkey
Kumite −65 kg	Toshikatsu Azumi; Japan	Goran Romić; Yugoslavia	José Puertas; Spain
Kumite −70 kg	Haldun Alagaş; Turkey	Vincenzo Amicone; Italy	Yoshimiro Anzai; Japan
Kumite −70 kg	Haldun Alagaş; Turkey	Vincenzo Amicone; Italy	William Thomas; Great Britain
Kumite −75 kg	Hideo Tamaru; Japan	Paul Alderson; Great Britain	Greg Francis; Great Britain
Kumite −75 kg	Hideo Tamaru; Japan	Paul Alderson; Great Britain	Gennaro Talarico; Italy
Kumite −80 kg	José Manuel Egea; Spain	Morten Alstadsæther; Norway	Oliver Pokorni; Sweden
Kumite −80 kg	José Manuel Egea; Spain	Morten Alstadsæther; Norway	Roberto Hernández; Mexico
Kumite +80 kg	Marc Pyrée; France	Ian Cole; Great Britain	Ralf Brachmann; West Germany
Kumite +80 kg	Marc Pyrée; France	Ian Cole; Great Britain	İbrahim Ercin; Turkey
Kumite open ippon	Giovanni Tramontini; France	Veselin Mićović; Yugoslavia	Yorihisa Uchida; Japan
Kumite open ippon	Giovanni Tramontini; France	Veselin Mićović; Yugoslavia	Marc Hamon; Canada
Kumite open sanbon	Wayne Otto; Great Britain	Steve Jez; Australia	Víctor Alvarado; Spain
Kumite open sanbon	Wayne Otto; Great Britain	Steve Jez; Australia	Anthony Leito; Netherlands
Team kumite	Great Britain	France	Spain
Team kumite	Great Britain	France	Netherlands

=== Women ===
Event	Gold	Silver	Bronze
Individual kata	Yuki Mimura; Japan	Hisami Yokoyama; Japan	Debbie Tang; United States
Team kata	Japan	United States	France
Kumite −53 kg	Yuko Hasama; Japan	Adriana Flores; Mexico	Yvonne Senff; Netherlands
Kumite −53 kg	Yuko Hasama; Japan	Adriana Flores; Mexico	Eva María Chamarro; Spain
Kumite −60 kg	Monique Amghar; France	Chiara Stella Bux; Italy	Carola Dörrie; West Germany
Kumite −60 kg	Monique Amghar; France	Chiara Stella Bux; Italy	Molly Samuel; Great Britain
Kumite +60 kg	Catherine Belrhiti; France	Marzia Sartirani; Italy	Bernadette Brogan; Australia
Kumite +60 kg	Catherine Belrhiti; France	Marzia Sartirani; Italy	Keiko Kawano; Japan

== Medal table ==
Rank	Nation	Gold	Silver	Bronze	Total
1	Japan	6	3	3	12
2	France	4	1	2	7
3	Great Britain	2	2	3	7
4	Italy	1	4	1	6
5	Norway	1	1	0	2
6	Spain	1	0	5	6
7	Turkey	1	0	4	5
8	Yugoslavia	0	2	0	2
9	Australia	0	1	1	2
9	Mexico	0	1	1	2
9	United States	0	1	1	2
12	Netherlands	0	0	3	3
13	West Germany	0	0	2	2
14	Canada	0	0	1	1
14	Sweden	0	0	1	1
Totals (15 entries)		16	16	28	60
