= Yıldız Aras =

Turkish karateka (born 1977)

- Born: November 10, 1977 (age 48); Istanbul, Turkey
- Nationality: Turkish
- Division: +60 kg, open
- Style: Karate Kumite
- Team: Kocaeli Büyükşehir Belediyesi Kağıt Spor Kulübü
- Rank: 3rd, 1st (open)

Other information
- University: Marmara University

Yıldız Aras (born November 10, 1977, in Istanbul, Turkey) is a Turkish karateka competing in the kumite +60 kg and open divisions. Aras is member of the Kocaeli Büyükşehir Belediyesi Kağıt Spor Kulübü Karate team. As of May 2009, she is world's best in women's kumite open division.

== Personal life ==
She was born as the fifth daughter to her father from Kars / Arpaçay and to her mother from Sivas /zara. She is a graduate of the School of Physical Education and Sports at the Marmara University in Istanbul.

== Sports career ==
Inspired from the TV films depicting martial arts that became very popular in Turkey in the late 1980s, she entered in 1987, at the age of only 10, into a karate course in her neighborhood. She became a member of the Ersoy Çırlar Sport Club. Her first trainer was Yüksel Baltay, a former national karateka.

Aras was admitted to the national team in 1994. She has been nicknamed by foreign sportspeople as the "Strong Girl". Holding three world champion titles, seven European champion titles, and three Mediterranean Games champion titles, she is the most successful Turkish sportsperson ever, but without any Olympic medal, since karate is not an acknowledged discipline at the Olympic Games.

== Achievements ==
=== Individual ===
2009

- 44th European Championships in Zagreb, Croatia – May 8–10 – kumite +68 kg

2008

- 43rd European Championships in Tallinn, Estonia – May 2–4 – kumite +60 kg, kumite open

2007

- 42nd European Championships in Bratislava, Slovakia – May 4–6 – kumite +60 kg, kumite open
- Italian Open in Monza, Italy – March 31-April 1 – kumite +60 kg – 5th

2006

- 18th World Championships in Tampere, Finland – October 12–15 – kumite open
- 41st European Championships in Stavanger, Norway – May 5–7 – kumite +60 kg, kumite open

2005

- World Games in Duisburg, Germany – July 23–24 – kumite open
- 15th Mediterranean Games in Almeria, Spain – June 24-July 3 – kumite +65 kg, kumite open
- 40th European Championships in Tenerife, Spain – May 13–15 – kumite +60 kg, kumite open

2004

- 39th European Championships in Moscow, Russia – May 7–9 – kumite open

2003

- 38th European Championships in Bremen, Germany – May 9–11 – kumite +60 kg, kumite open

2002

- 37th European Championships in Tallinn, Estonia – May 3–5 – kumite open

2001

- 14th Mediterranean Games in Tunis, Tunisia – September 2–15 – kumite open

2000

- 2nd World University Karate Championships in Kyoto, Japan – July 7–9 – kumite +60 kg
- 15th World Championships in Munich, Germany – October 12–15 – kumite open
- 35th European Championships in Istanbul, Turkey – May 5–7 – kumite open

1998

- 14th World Championships in Rio de Janeiro, Brazil – October 18 – kumite open

1997

- World Cup in Manila, Philippines – September 13–14 – kumite open
- 24th European Cadet & Junior Championships in Greece – kumite +60 kg
- 13th Mediterranean Games in Bari, Italy – June 13–25 – kumite open

1996

- 31st European Championships in Paris, France – May 3–5 – kumite open

=== Team ===
2004

- 39th European Championships in Moscow, Russia – May 7–9 – kumite female team
- 17th World Championships in Monterrey, Mexico – November 18–21 – kumite female team

2002

- 16th World Championships in Madrid, Spain – November 21–24 – kumite female team

2001

- 36th European Championships in Sofia, Bulgaria – May 11–13 – kumite female team

2000

- 2nd World University Karate Championships in Kyoto, Japan – July 7–9 – kumite female team
- 35th European Championships in Istanbul, Turkey – May 5–7 – kumite female team

1999

- 34th European Championships in Euboea, Greece – May 21–23 – kumite female team

1998

- 33rd European Championships in Belgrade, Yugoslavia – May 8–10 – kumite female team
- 14th World Championships in Rio de Janeiro, Brazil – October 18 – kumite female team

1997

- 32nd European Championships in Santa Cruz de Tenerife, Spain – May 2–4 – kumite female team

== World ranking ==
As of May 9, 2009, she ranks:

- World: 3rd
- Kumite female +60 kg (World): 8th
- Kumite female +68 kg (World): 3rd
- Kumite female open (World): 1st

== See also ==
- Turkish women in sports
