= 1990 European Karate Championships =

Karate competition

- Location: Vienna, Austria
- Dates: 21–23 May
- Competitors: 430 from 26 nations

The 1990 European Karate Championships, the 25th edition, was held in Vienna from 2 to 4 May 1990.

== Medal table ==
* Host nation (Austria)

Rank	Nation	Gold	Silver	Bronze	Total
1	Italy	4	4	1	9
2	France	4	2	4	10
3	Spain	3	3	4	10
4	England	3	1	1	5
5	West Germany	2	0	3	5
6	Sweden	1	0	0	1
7	Scotland	0	3	1	4
8	Norway	0	2	2	4
9	Czechoslovakia	0	1	1	2
10	Switzerland	0	1	0	1
11	Netherlands	0	0	5	5
12	Austria*	0	0	2	2
12	Finland	0	0	2	2
14	Hungary	0	0	1	1
14	North Macedonia	0	0	1	1
14	Turkey	0	0	1	1
14	Yugoslavia	0	0	1	1
Totals (17 entries)		17	17	30	64

== Medallists ==
=== Men's Competition ===
==== Individual ====
Event	Gold	Silver	Bronze
Kata	(Italy) Dario Marchini	(Scotland) Steve Morris	(Italy) Pasquale Acri
Kumite -60 kg	(Sweden) Christian Keil	(Italy) Daniele Simmi	(Spain) David Luque Camacho (Norway) Stein Rønning
Kumite -65 kg	(Italy) Francesco Muffato	(England) Tim Stephens	(Netherlands) Reginaldo Doran (Spain) Jesús Juan Rubio
Kumite -70 kg	(France) Bruno Pellicier	(Spain) Victor Alvarado	(Turkey) Haldun Alagaş (Norway) Harald Arnesen
Kumite -75 kg	(West Germany) Toni Dietl	(Switzerland) Djim Doula	(Netherlands) Delano van der Kust (Socialist Federal Republic of Yugoslavia) Džezmir Muratagic
Kumite -80 kg	(Spain) José Manuel Egea	(Czechoslovakia) Miroslav Gachulinec	(England) Mervyn Etienne (France) Christophe Pinna
Kumite +80 kg	(France) Marc Pyrée	(Norway) Jarle Sorken	(Spain) Juan Antonio Hernández (West Germany) Jürgen Lemmen
Kumite Sanbon	(England) Mike Sailsman	(Norway) Harald Arnesen	(Finland) Juha Nieminen (Austria) George Petermann
Kumite Ippon	(France) Thierry Masci	(France) Giovanni Tramontini	(Hungary) Tamás Molnár (West Germany) Ralf Wintergerst

==== Team ====
Event	Gold	Silver	Bronze
Kata	Italy	Spain	France
Kumite	England	Spain	France; Scotland

=== Women's competition ===
==== Individual ====
Event	Gold	Silver	Bronze
Kata	(Spain) Maite San Narciso	(Italy) Cristina Restelli	(Spain) Marisa Rozalen
Kumite -53 kg	(Italy) Anna Di Cesare	(Scotland) Veronica Penman	(Netherlands) Ivonne Senff (Finland) Sari Laine
Kumite -60 kg	(West Germany) Ruth Hahn	Scotland	North Macedonia; Czechoslovakia
Kumite +60 kg	(France) Cathérine Belhriti	(France) Marie-Ange Legros	(Netherlands) Annelies Bremmers (West Germany) Silvia Wiegaertner

==== Team ====
Event	Gold	Silver	Bronze
Kata	Spain	Italy	France
Kumite	England	Italy	Austria; Netherlands
