= 1989 European Karate Championships =

Karate competition

- Location: (Socialist Federal Republic of Yugoslavia) Titograd, Yugoslavia
- Dates: May 1989
- Competitors: 370 from 23 nations

The 1989 European Karate Championships, the 24th edition, was held in Titograd, Yugoslavia, in May 1989.

== Medal table ==
* Host nation (Yugoslavia)

Rank	Nation	Gold	Silver	Bronze	Total
1	France	6	3	4	13
2	Italy	5	1	0	6
3	Netherlands	2	2	3	7
4	Great Britain	1	3	1	5
5	Spain	1	2	5	8
6	Sweden	1	1	4	6
7	Finland	1	0	0	1
8	West Germany	0	2	4	6
9	Scotland	0	2	0	2
10	Turkey	0	1	0	1
11	Yugoslavia*	0	0	4	4
12	Norway	0	0	3	3
13	Cyprus	0	0	1	1
13	Switzerland	0	0	1	1
Totals (14 entries)		17	17	30	64

== Medallists ==
=== Men's competition ===
==== Individual ====
Event	Gold	Silver	Bronze
Kata	(Italy) Dario Marchini	(Scotland) Steve Morris	(Spain) Juan Carlos de la Fuente
Kumite -60 kg	(France) Damien Dovy	(Spain) David Luque Camacho	(Sweden) Christian Keil (Norway) Stein Rønning
Kumite -65 kg	(France) Didier Lupo	(Turkey) Haldun Alagaş	(Socialist Federal Republic of Yugoslavia) Dragoljub Kopitović (United Kingdom) Tim Stephens
Kumite -70 kg	(France) Bruno Pellicier	(United Kingdom) William Thomas	(Switzerland) Olivier Knupfer (Socialist Federal Republic of Yugoslavia) Dragoljub Fatić
Kumite -75 kg	(Italy) Andrea Lentini	(Scotland) Laughland Wylie	(Netherlands) Delano van der Kust (Socialist Federal Republic of Yugoslavia) Džezmir Muratagic
Kumite -80 kg	(Spain) José Manuel Egea	(Netherlands) Dudley Josepa	(Spain) Serafin Blanco Granes (Sweden) Thomas Hallman
Kumite +84 kg	(France) Marc Pyrée	(United Kingdom) Vic Charles	(Spain) Juan Antonio Hernández (Sweden) Jöran Thell
Kumite Sanbon	(Netherlands) Dudley Josepa	(France) Serge Tomao	(Sweden) Karl Daggfeldt (West Germany) Kostas Sariyannis
Kumite Ippon	(France) Thierry Masci	(Sweden) Thomas Hallman	(Cyprus) Pavlo Protopapa (West Germany) Jörg Reuss

==== Team ====
Event	Gold	Silver	Bronze
Kata	Italy	Spain	France
Kumite	Sweden	France	Norway; Yugoslavia

=== Women's competition ===
==== Individual ====
Event	Gold	Silver	Bronze
Kata	(Italy) Cristina Restelli	(West Germany) Simone Schreiner	(Spain) Maite San Narciso
Kumite -53 kg	(Netherlands) Ivonne Senff	(Italy) Anna Di Cesare	(France) Cathérine Girardet (West Germany) Gabi Koslowski
Kumite -60 kg	(United Kingdom) Molly Samuel	(United Kingdom) Annette Bailey	(France) Monique Amghar (Netherlands) Annelies Bouma
Kumite +60 kg	(France) Cathérine Belhriti	(Netherlands) Annelies Bremmers	(Netherlands) Laicam How (West Germany) Silvia Wiegaertner

==== Team ====
Event	Gold	Silver	Bronze
Kata	Italy	West Germany	France
Kumite	Finland	France	Norway; Spain
