= 2003 European Karate Championships =

Karate competition

- Location: Bremen, Germany
- Dates: 9–11 May

The 2003 European Karate Championships, the 38th edition, was held in Bremen, Germany from 9 to 11 May 2003.

== Medal table ==
* Host nation (Germany)

Rank	Nation	Gold	Silver	Bronze	Total
1	France	5	4	6	15
2	Spain	4	4	2	10
3	Germany*	2	1	4	7
4	Italy	2	1	3	6
5	Turkey	2	1	1	4
6	Serbia and Montenegro	1	1	0	2
7	Albania	1	0	1	2
8	Croatia	0	1	6	7
9	Bosnia and Herzegovina	0	1	1	2
9	England	0	1	1	2
11	Belgium	0	1	0	1
11	Greece	0	1	0	1
13	Slovakia	0	0	3	3
14	Austria	0	0	2	2
14	Russia	0	0	2	2
16	Luxembourg	0	0	1	1
16	Netherlands	0	0	1	1
Totals (17 entries)		17	17	34	68

== Medallists ==
=== Men's competition ===
==== Individual ====
Event	Gold	Silver	Bronze
Kata	(Italy) Luca Valdesi	(Spain) Francisco Hernández	(Croatia) Kristian Novak (France) Joël Carpin
Kumite –60 kg	(France) Davy Dona	(Spain) Davíd Luque	(France) Cécil Boulesnane (Italy) Francesco Ortu
Kumite –65 kg	(France) Alexandre Biamonti	(Greece) Dimítrios Triantafýllis	(France) Medhi Alloune (Germany) Christian Grüner
Kumite –70 kg	(Spain) Oscar Vázquez	(Belgium) Diego Vandeschrick	(Croatia) Junior Lefevre (France) Rida Bel Lahsen
Kumite –75 kg	(Spain) Iván Leal	(Italy) Salvatore Loria	(Slovakia) Klaudio Farmadin (Russia) Sergei Valkonin
Kumite –80 kg	(France) Seydina Baldé	(France) Youcef Hamour	(Albania) Afrim Latifi (Russia) Andrey Potapov
Kumite +80 kg	(Serbia and Montenegro) Miloš Živković	(Turkey) Zeynel Çelik	(Spain) Óscar Martínez (Netherlands) Daniël Sabanovic
Kumite Open	(Albania) Afrim Latifi	(France) Olivier Beaudry	(Croatia) Junior Lefevre (Germany) Aiko Thedinga

==== Team ====
Event	Gold	Silver	Bronze
Kata	Italy; Vincenzo Figuccio; Lucio Maurino; Luca Valdesi	Spain; Francisco Hernández; Víctor López; Fernando San José	Austria France
Kumite	Spain; Serafín Blanco; Daniel García; Iván Leal; Francisco Martínez; Ángel Ramiro; David Santana; Óscar Vázquez	England	Bosnia and Herzegovina Croatia

=== Women's competition ===
==== Individual ====
Event	Gold	Silver	Bronze
Kata	(Spain) Miriam Cogolludo	(France) Sabrina Buil	(Germany) Marié Niino (Slovakia) Marcela Remiášová
Kumite –53 kg	(Turkey) Gülderen Çelik	(Bosnia and Herzegovina) Lejla Ferhatbegović Dizdarević	(Germany) Kora Knühmann (Croatia) Jelena Kovačević
Kumite –60 kg	(Germany) Alexandra Witteborn	(Croatia) Petra Naranđa	(Italy) Chiara Stella Bux (Slovakia) Eva Medveďová
Kumite +60 kg	(Turkey) Yıldız Aras	(France) Nelly Moussaïd	(France) Laurence Fischer (Luxembourg) Tessy Scholtes
Kumite Open	(Spain) Gloria Casanova	(Germany) Nadine Ziemer	(Turkey) Yıldız Aras (Italy) Roberta Minet

==== Team ====
Event	Gold	Silver	Bronze
Kata	France	Spain; Miriam Cogolludo; Ruth Jiménez; Almudena Muñoz	Austria Croatia
Kumite	Germany; Kora Knühmann; Kerstin Pönisch; Alexandra Witteborn; Nadine Ziemer	Serbia and Montenegro	England Spain; Gloria Casanova; Cristina Feo; Noelia Fernández; Lucía Zamora
