= Karate at the 2001 World Games – Women's kumite 53 kg =

Karate women's kumite 53 kg at the 2001 World Games
- Venue: Tenno Town Gymnasium, Tenno, Akita, Japan
- Dates: 18 August 2001
- Competitors: 7 from 5 nations

Medalists
| gold medal | (Japan) Sachiko Miyamoto |
| silver medal | (Japan) Eri Fujioka |
| bronze medal | (Finland) Sari Laine |

The women's kumite 53 kg competition in karate at the 2001 World Games took place on 18 August 2001 at the Tenno Town Gymnasium in Tenno, Akita, Japan.

== Competition format ==
A total of 7 athletes entered the competition. In preliminary round they fought in two groups. Winners of this groups advanced to gold medal match. Second place athletes advanced to bronze medal match.

== Results ==
=== Preliminary round ===
==== Group A ====
| Rank | Athlete | B | W | D | L | Pts | SP | JPN | PER | JPN |
|---|---|---|---|---|---|---|---|---|---|---|
| 1 | Eri Fujioka (JPN) | 2 | 2 | 0 | 0 | 4 | 15 | | W | W |
| 2 | Gladys Alberto (PER) | 2 | 0 | 1 | 1 | 1 | 6 | L | | D |
| 3 | Mayuko Okamoto (JPN) | 2 | 0 | 1 | 1 | 1 | 3 | L | D | |

==== Group B ====
| Rank | Athlete | B | W | D | L | Pts | SP | JPN | FIN | ITA | GUA |
|---|---|---|---|---|---|---|---|---|---|---|---|
| 1 | Sachiko Miyamoto (JPN) | 3 | 1 | 1 | 1 | 3 | 9 | | D | L | W |
| 2 | Sari Laine (FIN) | 3 | 0 | 3 | 0 | 3 | 5 | D | | D | D |
| 3 | Michela Nanni (ITA) | 3 | 1 | 1 | 1 | 3 | 4 | W | D | | L |
| 4 | Cheily Gonzalez (GUA) | 3 | 1 | 1 | 1 | 3 | 3 | L | D | W | |

=== Finals ===
| | Score | |
Gold medal match
| Eri Fujioka (JPN) | 8−13 | Sachiko Miyamoto (JPN) |
Bronze medal match
| Gladys Alberto (PER) | 0−1 | Sari Laine (FIN) |
