= Rahul Kumar Yadav =

Indian karateka and coach

Personal information
- National team: India
- Born: Rahul Kumar
- Home town: Fatehabad, Haryana
- Occupations: Karate athlete and coach

Sport
- Country: India
- Sport: Karate
- Events: Kata, Kumite
Medal record
Men's Karate
Representing India
Indo-Bhutan Karate Championship
Gold medal – first place	2009 Thimphu, Bhutan	Kata
ISKA Australian Open
Silver medal – second place	2015 Sydney, Australia	Kumite
Gold medal – first place	2016 Sydney, Australia	Kata
Canada Open Karate Championship
Gold medal – first place	2017 Vancouver, Canada	Kata
Gold medal – first place	2018 Vancouver, Canada	Kata
International Turkish Open
Bronze medal – third place	2019 Turkey	Kata
International Bosphorus Cup
Bronze medal – third place	2020 Istanbul, Turkey	Kata

Rahul Kumar Yadav, known professionally as Rahul Kumar, is an Indian karate athlete and coach. He won gold at the Indo-Bhutan Karate Championship in 2009, the ISKA Australian Open in 2016, and the Canada Open in 2017 and 2018. He won silver at the ISKA Australian Open in 2015 and bronze at the International Turkish Open in 2019. In 2011, he represented India at the World Karate Federation's World Cadet, Junior and U21 Karate Championships in Malaysia and at the Commonwealth Karate Championships in Durban, South Africa, in 2018.

== Early life ==
Yadav is from Fatehabad, Haryana. He was trained and coached by Rajnesh Chaudhary. He began competing in 1999 at an inter-school karate championship.

== Career ==
In 2006, Yadav won gold at the Tenshinkan National Karate Championship in Nainital, organised by the Tenshinkan Karate-Do Federation India. He won gold in kumite at the National Karate Championships in 2009, 2013 and 2015, organised by the All India Dhammika Kai Karate-Do Federation. In 2016, he won gold in kumite at the Kotaka Cup in New Delhi, organised by the International Karate Federation. He won gold at the 13th All India Independence Cup Karate Championship in New Delhi in 2017. In 2018, he won gold in senior men's kumite above 84 kg at the 10th National Karate Championship in Goa.

Yadav won gold in the 60–65 kg category at the Afro-Asian Karate Championship held in Haryana in 2007. He also won gold in kata at the Indo-Bhutan Karate Championship in Thimphu in 2009. In the same year, he won a silver medal in karate at the Asian Championship Cup in Bangkok, Thailand. He won a silver medal in kumite at the 16th International High School Karate and Kick Boxing Championship in Kathmandu, Nepal, in 2010. In 2011, he competed in the Under-21 men's −78 kg kumite category at the World Karate Federation's 7th World Cadet, Junior and U21 Karate Championships in Malacca, Malaysia.

Yadav won gold in the individual kumite event at the 2013 SSKI Asia Cup Karate Championship in Delhi. In 2015, he competed at the ISKA Australian Open in Sydney, where he won a silver medal in kumite after securing three wins to reach the final. He returned to the competition in 2016 and won gold.

In 2017, he represented India at the World Karate Federation Karate 1 Premier League in Dubai. In 2017, he secured first place in the senior men's category at the 3rd International Karate Championship in Thimphu, Bhutan. He also won gold in men's kata at the Canada Open Karate Championships that year and retained the title in 2018 in Vancouver, Canada.

In 2018, Yadav was selected to compete at the 9th Commonwealth Karate Championships in Durban, South Africa, organised by the Commonwealth Karate Federation.

In 2019, he won a bronze medal in the senior men's kata category at the International Turkish Open Karate Tournament, organised by the Turkish Karate Federation and held in Istanbul, Turkey, from 27 to 29 September. In 2020, he won another bronze medal in men's kata at the 33rd International Bosphorus Karate Cup in Istanbul, Turkey.

=== Rankings and Dan grades ===
He was ranked 98th in the World Karate Federation rankings in 2014. As of 2026, he was ranked 102nd in the World Karate Federation's all-time rankings for the under-21 men's kumite −78 kg category.

He attained a Black Belt fourth Dan from the Karate India Organisation in 2021 and a Black Belt third Dan (Sandan) from the USA National Karate Federation (USA Karate) in 2026. He was awarded the 5th dan rank in karate by the All India Karate-Do Federation in 2014.

=== Coaching and officiating ===
He served as chief coach of the district karate team of the Karate Association of Fatehabad.

In November 2013, he served as team manager of the Indian team at the 8th World Cadet, Junior and U21 Karate Championships in Guadalajara, Spain, followed by the 8th Commonwealth Karate Championship in New Delhi in September 2015.

Since 2026, he has worked as a referee and judge with the USA National Karate Federation, as a coach and official with the Amateur Athletic Union, and as an official with the International Karate Federation. In 2026, he officiated at the USA Karate National Championship in Spokane, Washington, and at a karate competition in Sacramento, California.

== Achievements ==
International

Year	Competition	Venue	Position	Event	Notes
Representing India
2009	Indo-Bhutan Karate Championship	Thimphu, Bhutan	Gold	Kata	Dhammika Karate-Do Kai Kan Bhutan
2010	16th International High School Karate and Kick Boxing Championship	Kathmandu, Nepal	Silver	Kumite	Ministry of Youth and Sports / National Sports Council
2010	Gopal Singh Memorial Official Karate Championship	Nepal	Gold	Kumite	Nepal Karate Federation
2013	3rd SSKI Asia Cup Karate Championship	Delhi, India	Gold	Individual kumite	Shito-Ryu Seiko-Kai Karate-Do India
2015	ISKA Australian Open	Sydney, Australia	Silver	Kumite	International Sport Karate Association
2016	ISKA Australian Open	Sydney, Australia	Gold	Kata	International Sport Karate Association
2017	3rd International Karate Championship	Thimphu, Bhutan	Gold	Senior men's category	Bhutan Karate Association
2017	Canada Open Karate Championship	Vancouver, Canada	Gold	Kata	Karate Canada / Karate BC
2018	Canada Open Karate Championship	Vancouver, Canada	Gold	Kata	Karate Canada / Karate BC
2019	International Turkish Open	Turkey	Bronze	Kata	Turkish Karate Federation
2020	33rd International Bosphorus Karate Cup	Istanbul, Turkey	4th	Kata	Turkish Karate Federation

National

Year	Competition	Venue	Position	Event	Notes
Representing Haryana
2006	Tenshinkan National Karate Championship	Nainital	1st	Kata	Tenshinkan Karate-Do Federation India
2007	National Karate Championship	Malerkotla	2nd	Kata, Kumite	Indian Amateur Karate-Do Association
2007	All India Invitational Karate Championship	Mussoorie	3rd	Kata	Shito-Ryu Karate School of India
2007	All India Invitational Karate Championship	Mussoorie	3rd	Kumite	Shito-Ryu Karate School of India
2009	National Karate Championship	Jhajjar	1st	Kumite	All India Dhammika Kai Karate-Do Federation
2013	National Karate Championship	Bahadurgarh	1st	Kumite	All India Dhammika Kai Karate-Do Federation
2015	National Karate Championship	Gandhinagar	1st	Kumite	All India Dhammika Kai Karate-Do Federation
2016	Kotaka Cup	New Delhi	1st	Kumite	International Karate Federation

== Personal life ==
Yadav moved to the United States and lives in California. He is married to Manita Yadav.

== See also ==
- List of people from Haryana
