= Davy Dona =

French karateka (born 1981)

Sport
- Sport: karate

Davy Dona (born 13 October 1981 in Choisy-le-Roi, France) is a French karateka who won a gold medal in the men's kumite -60 kg weight class at the 2003 European Karate Championships. He also runs a dojo with his wife, Lolita.
