= 2001 European Karate Championships =

Karate competition

- Location: Sofia, Bulgaria
- Dates: 27–30 November

The 2001 European Karate Championships, the 36th edition, were held in Sofia, Bulgaria from May 11 to 13, 2001.

== Medal table ==
* Host nation (Bulgaria)

| Rank | Nation | Gold | Silver | Bronze | Total |
|---|---|---|---|---|---|
| 1 | Spain | 7 | 2 | 6 | 15 |
| 2 | France | 6 | 1 | 7 | 14 |
| 3 | Italy | 2 | 3 | 4 | 9 |
| 4 | Turkey | 1 | 2 | 2 | 5 |
| 5 | Germany | 1 | 0 | 3 | 4 |
| 6 | England | 0 | 3 | 3 | 6 |
| 7 | Netherlands | 0 | 3 | 0 | 3 |
| 8 | Czech Republic | 0 | 1 | 1 | 2 |
| 9 | Bosnia and Herzegovina | 0 | 1 | 0 | 1 |
| 9 | Luxembourg | 0 | 1 | 0 | 1 |
| 11 | Yugoslavia | 0 | 0 | 5 | 5 |
| 12 | Greece | 0 | 0 | 1 | 1 |
| 12 | Romania | 0 | 0 | 1 | 1 |
| 12 | Slovakia | 0 | 0 | 1 | 1 |
| Totals (14 entries) | | 17 | 17 | 34 | 68 |

== Medallists ==
=== Men's competition ===
==== Individual ====
| Event | Gold | Silver | Bronze |
|---|---|---|---|
| Kata | (Italy) Luca Valdesi | (Italy) Lucio Maurino | (France) Joël Carpin (Spain) Javier Hernandez Alonso |
| Kumite -60 kg | (Spain) Davíd Luque Camacho | (England) Milo Hodge | (Socialist Federal Republic of Yugoslavia) Predrag Bajic (Slovakia) Michal Sebesta |
| Kumite -65 kg | (France) Alexandre Biamonti | (Turkey) Bahattin Kandaz | (England) Jason Ledgister (Spain) Angel Ramiro Molina |
| Kumite -70 kg | (Spain) Oscar Vázquez Martins | (Netherlands) Anthony Boelbaai | (Croatia) Junior Lefevre (Turkey) Haldun Alagaş |
| Kumite -75 kg | (Italy) Genmaro Talarico | (Bosnia and Herzegovina) Adnan Hadzic | (France) Olivier Beaudry (Spain) Iván Leal Reglero |
| Kumite -80 kg | (Spain) Tomas Herrero Barcelo | (Netherlands) Daniël Sabanovic | (France) Yann Baillon (France) Salvatore Loria |
| Kumite +80 kg | (France) Seydina Balde | (England) Leon Walters | (Italy) Davide Benetello (Italy) Stefano Maniscalco |
| Kumite Open | (Spain) David Felix | (Netherlands) Daniël Sabanovics | (Greece) Konstantinos Papadopoulos (Socialist Federal Republic of Yugoslavia) Predrag Stojadinov |

==== Team ====
| Event | Gold | Silver | Bronze |
|---|---|---|---|
| Kata | Spain | Italy | France; Turkey |
| Kumite | France | Spain | England; Italy |

=== Women's competition ===
==== Individual ====
| Event | Gold | Silver | Bronze |
|---|---|---|---|
| Kata | (France) Myriam Szkudlarek | (Czech Republic) Petra Nova | (Spain) Miriam Cogolludo de la Herras (Germany) Marié Niino |
| Kumite -53 kg | (Spain) Estefania Garcia Romo | (France) Nadia Mecheri | (Romania) Stefania Sandu (France) Vanessa Ruiz |
| Kumite -60 kg | (France) Nathalie LeRoy | (Turkey) Leyla Coşkun | (Germany) Nicole Jacobs (Czech Republic) Petra Piskscova |
| Kumite +60 kg | (France) Laurence Fischer | (Spain) Gloria Casanova Rodreiguez | (England) Tania Weekes (Socialist Federal Republic of Yugoslavia) Sara Grbic |
| Kumite Open | (Germany) Nadine Ziemer | (Luxembourg) Tessy Scholtes | (Spain) Cristina Feo Gomez (Socialist Federal Republic of Yugoslavia) Vanian Vrhovec |

==== Team ====
| Event | Gold | Silver | Bronze |
|---|---|---|---|
| Kata | Spain | Italy | Germany; Monja Kimmich; Schahrzad Mansouri; Claudia Völk France |
| Kumite | Turkey | England | Spain France |
