= Robert Gomis =

French karateka

Robert Gomis (born 1 May 1973 in Ziguinchor, Senegal) is a French karateka. He won a silver medal in the men's kumite 70 kg event at the 1999 European Karate Championships.
