= Haldun Alagaş =

Turkish karateka (born 1970)

- Born: November 16, 1970 (age 55); Izmit, Kocaeli, Turkey
- Nationality: Turkish
- Division: -70 kg
- Style: Karate
- Team: 2006-2010 Kocaeli Büyükşehir Belediyesi Kağıt Spor Kulübü; 1994-2005 Istanbul Büyükşehir Belediyespor
- Trainer: 2010-present Kayseri Büyükşehir Belediyespor
- Rank: 1st (world)

Other information
- University: Marmara University

Haldun Alagaş
Medal record

Men's Karate

World Championships
Gold medal – first place	1990 Mexico City	-70 kg
Gold medal – first place	1998 Rio de Janeiro	-70 kg

European Championships
Gold medal – first place	1991 Hanover	-70 kg
Gold medal – first place	1997 Tenerife	-70 kg
Gold medal – first place	2000 Istanbul	-70 kg
Silver medal – second place	1989 Titograd	-65 kg
Bronze medal – third place	1990 Vienna	-70 kg
Bronze medal – third place	1992 's-Hertogenbosch	-70 kg
Bronze medal – third place	1996 Paris	-70 kg
Bronze medal – third place	1998 Belgrade	-70 kg
Bronze medal – third place	2001 Sofia	-70 kg

Haldun Alagaş (born 16 November 1970) is a Turkish karateka competing in the kumite -70 kg division. He is multiple world and European champion and ranks first at world list in his weight division.

== Personal life ==
Born on November 16, 1970, in Izmit, he completed his primary and high school education in his hometown. Following his graduation from the high school, In 1989, Alagaş enrolled in the Middle East Technical University in Ankara to study physical education. However, he dropped out already in the first semester at prep school. From 1991 on, he studied physical education and sports at Marmara University in Istanbul, and graduated with a degree.

Haldun Alagaş is married to a music teacher. The couple has a son Emir and a daughter Elif.

== Sports career ==
Inspired by the martial art scenes in Battal Gazi films of Turkish actor Cüneyt Arkın and films of Bruce Lee, he began with karate sport in Izmit in 1982. His first official fight was at the 1986 Turkish Karate Championships, where he became champion in the youth category. He had the red belt.

With gaining success in sports at international level, karate became a passion for him.

Alagaş competed between 1994 and 2005 for Istanbul Büyükşehir Belediyespor's newly formed karate team. In 2006, Alagaş transferred to Kocaeli Büyükşehir Belediyesi Kağıt Spor Kulübü in his hometown, where he was until 2010.

Currently, he is coaching karateka in the Kayseri Büyükşehir Belediyespor.

== Achievements ==
Year	Competition	Venue	Position	Event	Notes
Representing Turkey
1989	European Championships	Titograd, Yugoslavia	Silver	kumite -65 kg	
1990	European Championships	Vienna, Austria	Bronze	kumite -70 kg	
1990	World Championships	Mexico City, Mexico	Gold	kumite -70 kg	November 8–11
1991	European Championships	Hanover, Germany	Gold	kumite -70 kg	
1992	European Championships	's-Hertogenbosch, Netherlands	Bronze	kumite -70 kg	
1996	European Championships	Paris, France	Bronze	kumite -70 kg	May 3–5
1997	European Championships	Tenerife, Spain	Gold	kumite -70 kg	May 2–4
1998	European Championships	Belgrade, Yugoslavia	Bronze	kumite -70 kg	May 8–10
1998	World Championships	Rio de Janeiro, Brazil	Gold	kumite -70 kg	October 18
2000	European Championships	Istanbul, Turkey	Gold	kumite -70 kg	May 5–7
2001	European Championships	Sofia, Bulgaria	Bronze	kumite -70 kg	May 11–13
2005	Dutch Open	Rotterdam, Netherlands	Silver	kumite -70 kg	March 12–13
2010	Open de Paris	Paris, France	5th	kumite -84 kg	March 12–13

== Legacy ==
A multi-purpose indoor sport complex in Ümraniye district of Istanbul, the Haldun Alagaş Sports Hall, is named in honor of him.
