= Patricia Duggin =

English kareteka

- Style: Karate

Other information
- Website: Official site

Patricia Duggin she is a British karateka. She is the winner of multiple European Karate Championships and World Karate Championships Karate medals.

== Achievements ==
- 1994 European Karate Championships Bronze Medal
- 1995 European Karate Championships Bronze Medal
- 1996 World Karate Championships Kumite Gold Medal
- 1997 World Games Kumite Bronze Medal
- 1998 European Karate Championships Kumite Silver Medal
