= Thomas Nitschmann =

German karateka (born 1970)

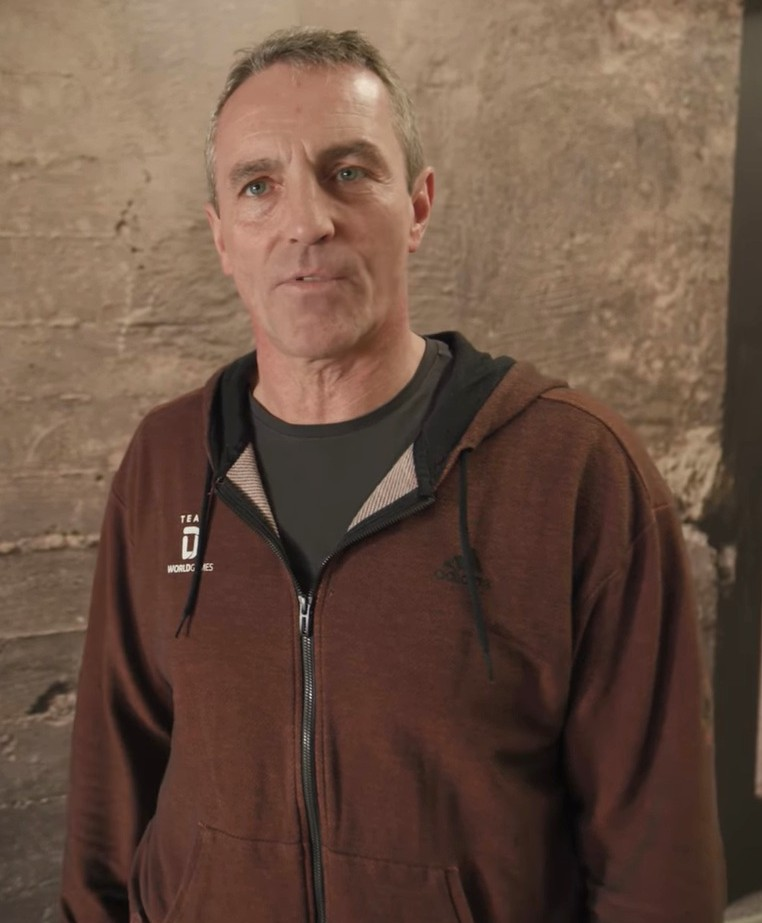
- Nitschmann in 2020
- Born: 8 June 1970 (age 56); Duisburg, West Germany
- Nationality: German
- Style: Karate

Thomas Nitschmann (born 8 June 1970), is a German karateka, currently 7th dan. A multiple medal winner in Karate and former Germany National Karate team coach.
