= Karin Sökare =

Swedish karateka

- Born: Karin Linnéa Olsson; November 9, 1964 (age 61); Haninge, Sweden
- Division: +60 kg
- Style: Karate (Kumite)
- Rank: 7th Dan

Other information
- Notable club: Väsby Shotokan Karateklubb

Karin Sökare (née Olsson; born November 9, 1964) is a Swedish karateka. She has a 7th Dan black belt in karate and is a World Games gold medalist.

Sökare is one of Sweden's most accomplished female karateka. She competed 15 years for the Swedish National Team and won 21 Swedish Championships and 7 Nordic Championships. She won the gold medal in 1987 Karate World Cup held in Budapest, and a bronze medal in 1984 Eakf European Karate Championships in Dublin. She won gold at the 1993 World Games in The Hague, Netherlands and the 28th edition of the Uek European Karate Championships, held in Prague, Czech Republic in May 1993. She earned two medals at the 1994 Uek European Karate Championships, held at the National Indoor Arena in Birmingham, England in May 1994.
