= Soufiane Sankhon =

French karateka (born 1974)

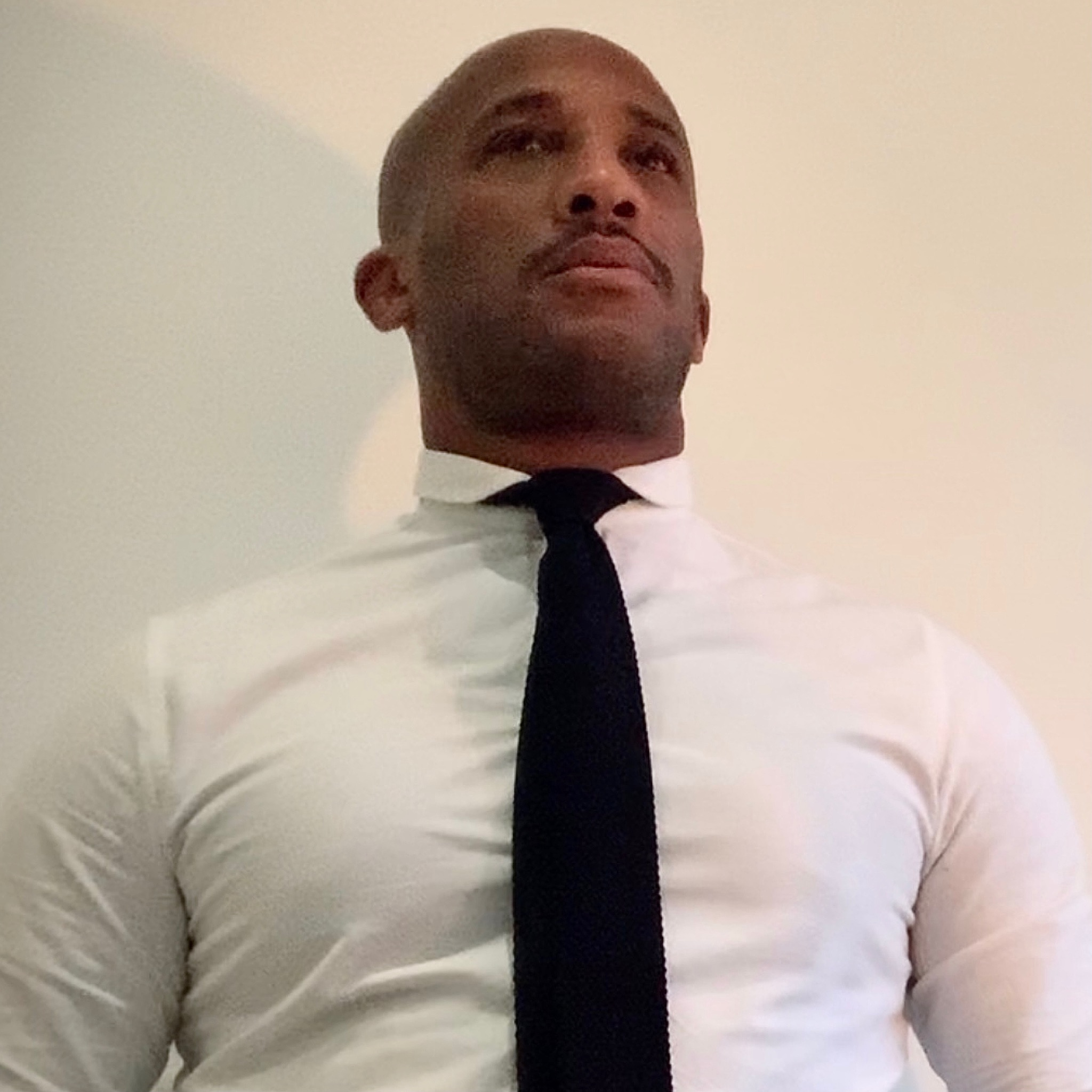
Soufiane Sankhon

Soufiane Sankhon (born 18 July 1974) is a French karateka who won a silver medal in the men's kumite in the -65 kg weight class at the 1999 European Karate Championships and two bronze medals in the men's kumite -65 kg weight class at the 1998 and 2000 European Karate Championships.
