= Nurhan Fırat =

Turkish karateka (born 1972)

- Born: September 4, 1972 (age 53); Bakırköy, İstanbul, Turkey
- Nationality: Turkish
- Division: +60 kg
- Style: Karate
- Rank: 5th (world +60kg); 12th (world open)

Nurhan Fırat
Medal record

Women's Karate

Representing Turkey

World Championships
Bronze medal – third place	1994 Kota Kinabalu	+60 kg
Silver medal – second place	1992 Grenada	+60 kg

European Championships
Bronze medal – third place	2000 Istanbul	+60 kg
Silver medal – second place	1999 Euboea	Open
Bronze medal – third place	1998 Belgrade	Open
Gold medal – first place	1997 Tenerife	+60 kg
Bronze medal – third place	1996 Paris	+60 kg
Bronze medal – third place	1995 Helsinki	+60 kg
Bronze medal – third place	1995 Helsinki	Open
Gold medal – first place	1993 Prague	Open
Bronze medal – third place	1992 's-Hertogenbosch	+60 kg

Nurhan Fırat (born September 4, 1972, in Istanbul, Turkey) is a Turkish female karateka competing in the kumite +60 kg and open divisions. She was twice European champion. Daughters-> Sâra Melike Celik, Erva Zehra Celik, Esma Mina Celik, Eslem Hafsa Celik.

== Achievements ==
Year	Competition	Venue	Position	Event	Notes
Representing Turkey
1992	European Championships	's-Hertogenbosch, Netherlands	Bronze	kumite +60 kg	
1992	World Championships	Grenada, Spain	Silver	kumite +60 kg	November 19–22
1993	European Championships	Prague, Czech Republic	Gold	kumite open	
1993	World Games	The Hague, Netherlands	Silver	kumite +60 kg	July 22-August 1
1994	World Championships	Kota Kinabalu, Malaysia	Bronze	kumite +60 kg	December 8–12
1995	European Championships	Helsinki, Finland	Bronze	kumite open	December 8–12
1995	European Championships	Helsinki, Finland	Bronze	kumite +60 kg	December 8–12
1996	European Championships	Paris, France	Bronze	kumite +60 kg	May 3–5
1997	European Championships	Tenerife, Spain	Gold	kumite +60 kg	May 2–4
1998	European Championships	Belgrade, Yugoslavia	Bronze	kumite open	May 8–10
1999	European Championships	Euboea, Greece	Silver	kumite open	May 20–23
2000	European Championships	Istanbul, Turkey	Bronze	kumite +60 kg	May 5–7

== See also ==
- Turkish women in sports
