= David Luque-Velasco =

Spanish tennis player (born 1984)

- Country (sports): Spain
- Born: 2 March 1984 (age 41); Barcelona, Spain
- Plays: Right-handed
- Prize money: $18,941

Singles
- Career record: 0–1 (ATP Tour)
- Highest ranking: No. 565 (22 May 2006)

Doubles
- Highest ranking: No. 712 (28 Aug 2006)

David Luque-Velasco (born 2 March 1984) is a Spanish former professional tennis player.

Luque-Velasco, a Catalan player, made his only ATP Tour main draw appearance at the 2006 Estoril Open as a lucky loser from qualifying and lost his first round match to Fred Gil in three sets. His career high singles ranking was 565 in the world. He has also competed on the World Padel Tour.

== ITF Futures titles ==
=== Doubles: (1) ===
No.	Date	Tournament	Surface	Partner	Opponents	Score
1.	Aug 2006	Italy F27, Bolzano	Clay	(Czech Republic) Dušan Karol	(China) Li Zhe (China) Wang Yu	6–3, 7–5
