= Junior Lefevre =

Belgian-Croatian karateka (born 1978)

- Born: Gustaff Lefevre; 17 October 1978 (age 48); Etterbeek, Belgium
- Style: Shotokan Karate
- Rank: 7th dan karate

Other information
- Website: Official site

Junior Lefevre (born 17 October 1978 in Etterbeek, Belgium) is a Belgian-Croatian karateka. He has a 7th Dan black belt in karate and is the winner of multiple World Karate Championships and European Karate Championships medals, representing both Croatia and Belgium at tournaments. He is also chairman of C.I.K.A world (champions international karate association).

== Achievements ==
=== Belgium ===
- 1996 World Karate Championships Kumite Bronze Medal
- 1998 World Karate Championships Kumite Bronze Medal

=== Croatia ===
- 2000 World Karate Championships Kumite -70 kg Gold Medal
- 2001 European Karate Championships Kumite -70 kg Bronze Medal
- 2002 World Karate Championships Kumite -70 kg Silver Medal
- 2003 European Karate Championships Kumite -70 kg Bronze Medal
- 2003 European Karate Championships Kumite Open Bronze Medal
