= Laurence Fischer =

French karateka (born 1973)

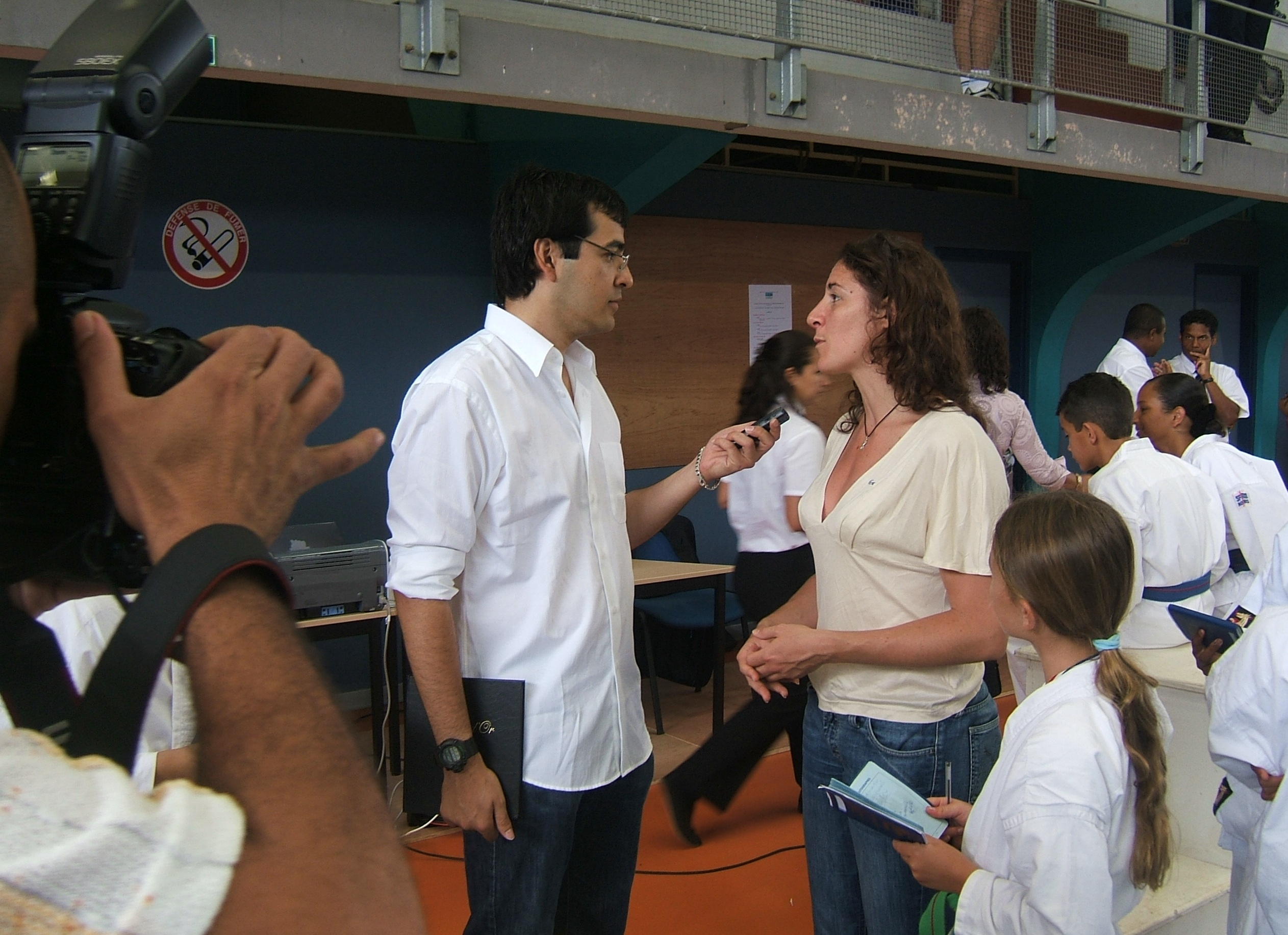
- Laurence Fischer and Journalist
- Born: 7 November 1973 (age 52); L'Union, Haute-Garonne, France
- Style: Karate
- Rank: 6th Dan

Laurence Fischer (born 7 November 1973 in L'Union, Haute-Garonne), France is a French karateka who specializes in kumite in the + 60 kg category. She has won three world championships of karate: two in individual and one in teams.

== Biography ==
Laurence began karate at the age of 12, encouraged by her father. Her international career spanned from 1995 to 2006. She won her first world title in 1998 and her first European title in 1999. In addition to her high-level sports career, she joined the sports department of the City of Marseille in 1998.

In 2006, the last year of her curriculum and international career, she won all the major competitions: Paris Open, French Championships, European Championships and World Championships. She is a two-year manager at the France headquarters of Nike.

She then chose to return to her first passion, the theater, following a year of training at Studio Pygmalion, then four years at the Cours d'art dramatique by Jean-Laurent Cochet.

== Charity work ==
In 2003, Laurence Fischer joined Play International (formerly Sport without Borders) and participated in her first humanitarian missions in France and around the world. She spent one month in Kabul in August 2005, with the first national women's karate team.

Since 2014, she has been working with the Panzi Foundation in the Democratic Republic of Congo to help women who have been victims of war rape to practice karate on a permanent basis.

She is also a member of the Board of Directors of the association Premiers de Cordée.

In March 2017, she founded Fight for Dignity and set up a sports and social program specifically adapted to women victims of violence. The aim is to duplicate the current model of collaboration with the Maison Dorcas of the Panzi Foundation.

== Other activities ==
- Member of the Jules Rimet Prize Jury
- Participant in Fort Boyard in 2004.
- TV Consultant: Sport + from 2005 to 2012, Kombat Sport, Team 21 for the Paris Open in January 2016
- Legion of Honour
