= Janice Francis =

English martial artist

- Style: Karate

Other information
- Website: www.jfikarate.co.uk

Janice Francis-Irwin is a British karateka. She is the winner of multiple European Karate Championships and World Karate Championships Karate medals.
