= Enver Idrizi =

Croatian karateka

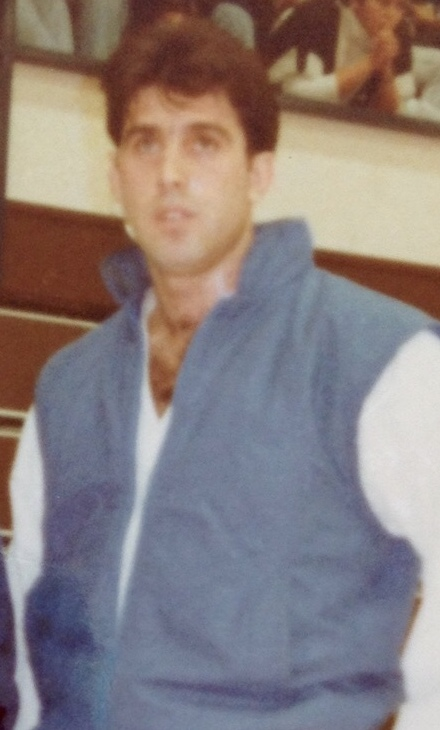
- Enver Idrizi at a karate competition in Amsterdam
- Born: 4 August 1966 (age 60); Skopje, SR Macedonia, SFR Yugoslavia
- Division: +80 kg
- Style: Karate (Kumite)

Other information
- Notable club: Tempo Zagreb
- Last updated on: 1995

Enver Idrizi (Macedonian: Енвер Идризи; born 4 August 1966) is a Croatian former karateka and former World Champion. He is an ethnic Albanian, born in Skopje. He was the karate champion of Yugoslavia at the age of 16. The day he won his first medal for Croatia was the day Croatia was officially recognized as an independent country. Because of him, karate has become a popular trophy sport in Croatia since Croatia's independence.

He played a role in the 1996 movie Don't Forget Me, directed by Jakov Sedlar.

Idrizi is a recipient of the Order of Danica Hrvatska with the face of Franjo Bučar.
