= Julliet Toney =

English karateka (born 1970)

- Born: 13 November 1970 (age 55)
- Style: Karate

Julliet Toney (born 13 November 1970) is an English karateka. She is the winner of multiple European Karate Championships and World Karate Championships Karate medals. Her twin sister is Jillian Toney.
