= William Thomas (karateka) =

English karateka

- Born: July 28, 1965 (age 61); St Albans, United Kingdom
- Other names: Nicholas
- Style: Karate
- Rank: 7th Dan

Other information
- Website: peak4karate.blogspot.co.uk

William Thomas is an English karateka. He is the winner of multiple European Karate Championships and World Karate Championships Karate medals. William Thomas son Jordan Thomas is also a world class karateka. In 2013 Thomas became the England National Coach winning cadet, junior and senior world championship gold medals before moving to Hong Kong in March 2017 to coach the Hong Kong National Karate Team achieving to date Olympic bronze medal at the Tokyo 2020 Games.

In 2022 William Thomas MH received the Medal of Honour (MH) from Hong Kong SAR for his contribution and leadership of the Hong Kong National team and Olympic success.
