= Michaël Milon =

French karateka

Michaël Milon (born 3 March 1972 in Loches, died 13 March 2002 in Paris) was a French karate champion. His tournament honours included:

- World Championships – Individual (1994, 1996, 2000)
- World Cup – Individual (1993, 1995, 1997)
- European Championship – Individual (1994, 1995, 1996, 1997)
- European Championship – Team (1991, 1994, 1995, 1996, 1997)
- French Championship – Individual (1993, 1995, 1997, 1998)
- Coupe de France de Karate – Individual (1990, 1993, 1994, 1995, 1997)
- The Mediterranean Games (1990)

In 2000 Milon retired from competitive tournament Karate. In 2001 he became the French national coach for the Junior Karate team. Away from Karate, Milon was a regular on French television.

On 13 March 2002 Michaël Milon was found dead from an apparent cocaine overdose.
