= Seydina Baldé =

French karateka

Medal record

Men's karate

Representing France

World Games
Gold medal – first place	2001 Akita	Kumite +80 kg

Seydina Baldé (born 23 September 1977) is a French actor and martial artist. He has been Europe and World Karate Champion.

Balde was born in Paris. He always wanted to become an actor, so went to theatre classes when he was a teenager and managed to be noticed while performing. He credits Jean-Claude Van Damme with inspiring him to pursue martial arts after watching his movies. At the age of 16, he began studying karate. He enjoyed quick success, winning the title of Junior Champion of the World after only four years of practice. In the world of martial arts, he is sometimes known by the nickname «la perle noire du karaté» ("the black pearl of karate").

Intending to become an actor as an adult, he went back to an acting class in Paris. he first appeared in the television adaptation of Largo Winch.

Baldé played the guide to blind runner Yannick (played by Cyril Descours) in the 2011 Wargnier film La Ligne droite.

He also starred in the film Covert Operation and then went on to star in the West African television series Lex Africana, which claims to be the first martial arts-based action thriller series from the region.

== Medals ==
- Silver medalist at the 2004 World Karate Championships at men's kumite open
- Bronze medalist at the 2002 World Karate Championships at men's kumite+80 kg
- Silver medalist at the 2000 World Karate Championships at men's kumite+80 kg
- Gold medalist at the 2003 European Karate Championships at men's kumite+80 kg
- Gold medalist at the 2002 European Karate Championships at men's kumite+80 kg
- Gold medalist at the 2001 European Karate Championships at men's kumite+80 kg
- Bronze medalist at the 2000 European Karate Championships at men's kumite+80 kg
- Silver medalist at the 1999 European Karate Championships at men's kumite+80 kg
- Bronze medalist at the 1998 European Karate Championships at men's kumite+80 kg
- Bronze medalist at the 1997 European Karate Championships at men's kumite-80 kg
