= Stein Rønning =

Norwegian karateka (1965–2008)

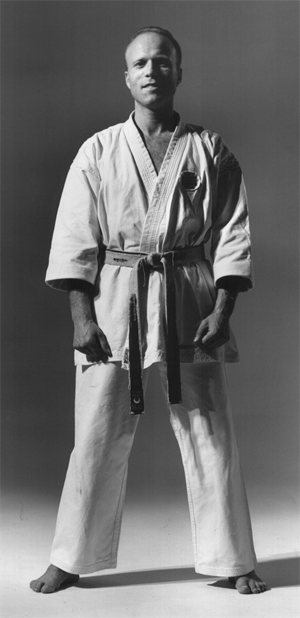
- Image of Stein Rønning
- Born: Stein Widar Rønning; 28 May 1965; Strand Municipality, Norway
- Died: 23 January 2008 (aged 42); Stavanger, Norway
- Style: Karate

Stein Widar Rønning (28 May 1965 – 23 January 2008) was a Norwegian karate master who had won international competitions, including the 1990 World Karate Championships, Male Kumite -60 kg, in Mexico City. He died in Stavanger.
