= Ian Cole (karateka) =

English karateka

- Style: Karate

Ian Cole is an English karateka. He has medalled at multiple European Karate Championships and World Karate Championships, and won the gold medal for men's open-weight kumite at the 1997 World Games.
