= Christophe Pinna =

French karateka

- Born: Christophe Pinna; 18 March 1968; Nice, France
- Nationality: French
- Height: 1.85 m (6 ft 1 in)
- Weight: 85 kg (187 lb; 13 st 5 lb)
- Style: Shotokan
- Years active: 1990–2000
- Last updated on: October 9, 2018

Christophe Pinna is a member of the French National Karate team. He is a multi-time World Champion (WKF). He is known for his roundhouse kicks.
