= María del Carmen García Alcay =

Spanish karateka

María del Carmen García Alcay (born Aragon, active 1989–2000) is a Spanish karateka, who competed under the name Carmen García. Her achievements include winning gold medals at the European Karate Championships in 1993, 1996 and 1997, and at the Karate World Championships in 1994.
