= Damien Dovy =

French-Beninese karateka

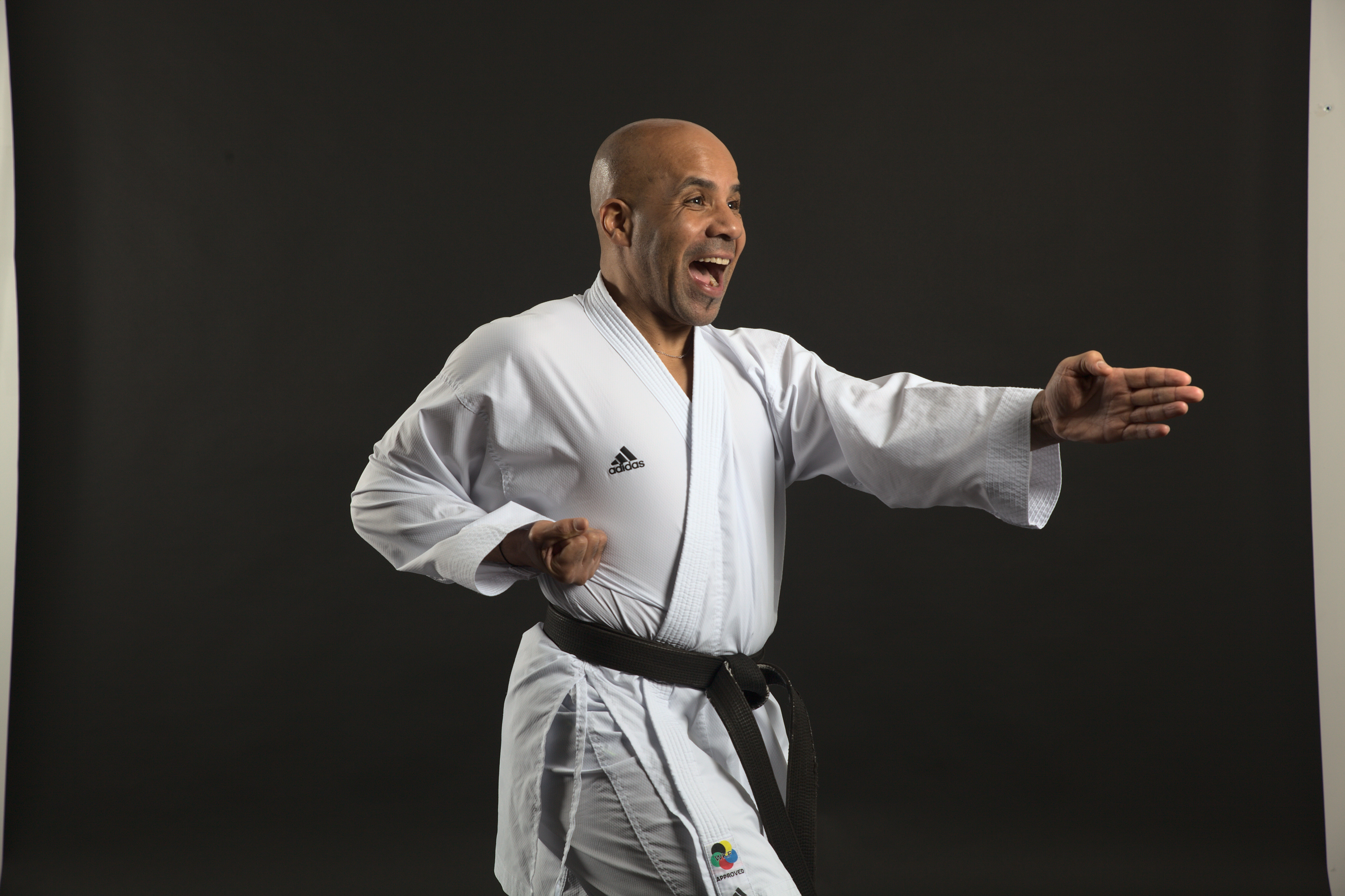

Medal record

Men's karate

Representing France

World Games
Bronze medal – third place	1993 The Hague	Kumite − 60 kg

Damien Dovy (born 31 March 1966 in Vitry-sur-Seine, France) is a French karateka who won multiple medals at Karate's top Competitions the European Karate Championships and World Karate Championships. Also lost with the Algerian/swedish Amin Boubeker in 1996 in swedish open in Stockholm , Although born in France Dovy also represented Benin the country of his heritage at international level.

- 2002 World Karate Championships, Gold medalist at men's kumite − 60 kg
- 2000 World Karate Championships, Bronze medalist at men's kumite − 60 kg
- 1997 European Karate Championships, Silver medalist at men's kumite − 60 kg
- 1996 European Karate Championships, Gold medalist at men's kumite − 60 kg
- 1995 European Karate Championships, Gold medalist at men's kumite − 60 kg
- 1994 World Karate Championships, Gold medalist at men's kumite − 60 kg
- 1994 European Karate Championships, Bronze medalist at men's kumite − 60 kg
- 1993 European Karrate Championships, Bronze medalist at men's kumite − 60 kg
- 1992 European Karate Championships, Gold medalist at men's kumite − 60 kg
- 1992 World Karate Championships, Bronze medalist at men's kumite − 60 kg
- 1989 European Karate Championships, Gold medalist at men's kumite − 60 kg
- 1988 European Karate Championships, Bronze medalist at men's kumite − 60 kg
