= Wayne Otto =

British karateka (born 1966)

Wayne Otto OBE
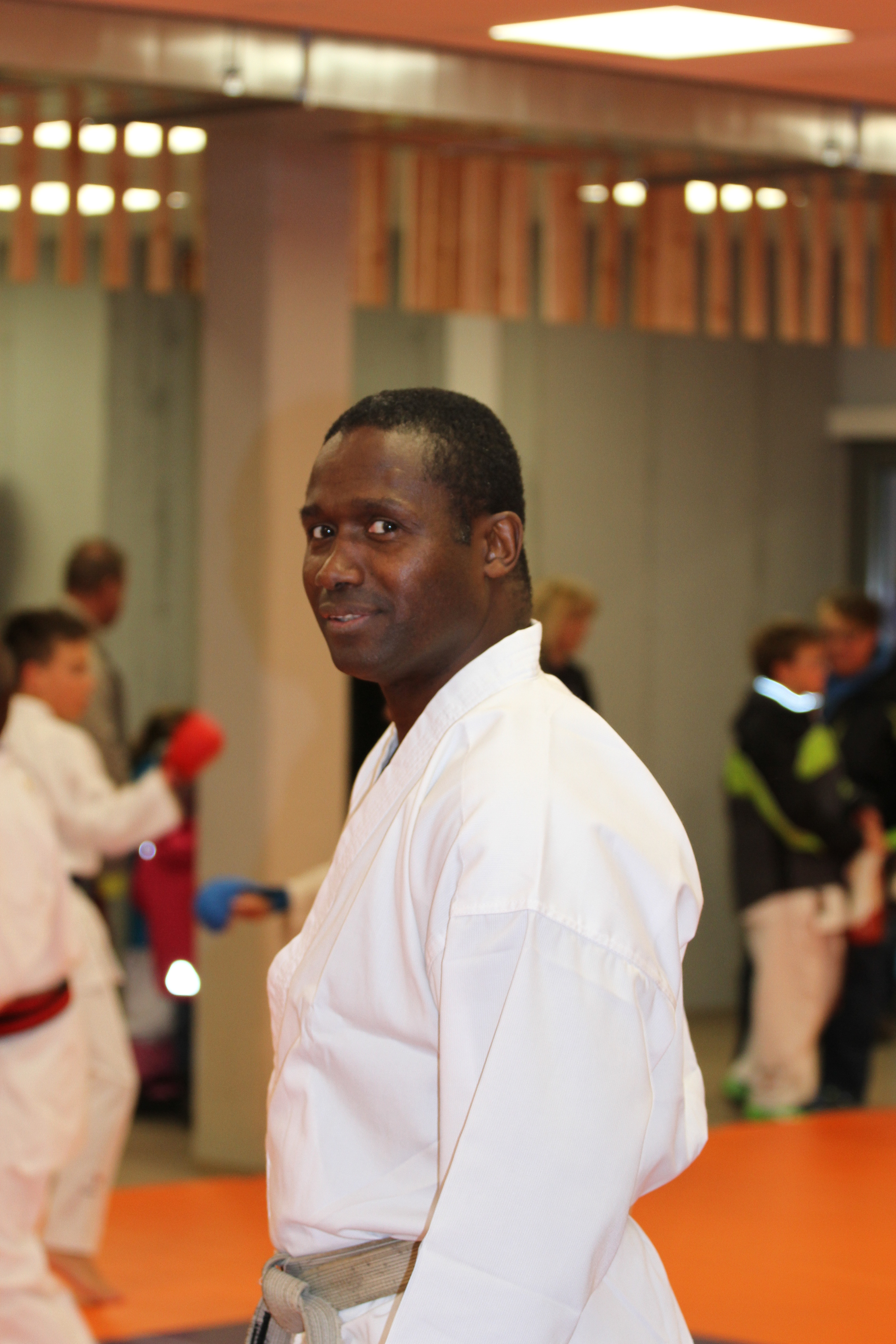
- Born: 18 May 1966 (age 60); Hackney, London, United Kingdom
- Style: Uechi-ryu, Karate
- Teacher: Terry Daly

Wayne Otto OBE (born 18 May 1966 in Hackney, London, United Kingdom) he is a British karateka. He has a 5th Dan black belt in karate and is the winner of nine World Karate Championships and is in the Guinness World Records for winning the most Karate medals. In 2012 Wayne became the head coach of the Norwegian Karate Federation.

Otto was appointed Officer of the Order of the British Empire (OBE) in the 2001 Birthday Honours for services to karate.
