= Sari Laine =

Finnish karateka (born 1962)

- Born: 18 November 1962 (age 63); Helsinki, Finland
- Style: Karate

Sari Laine (born 18 November 1962) is a Finnish karateka. She has a 5th Dan black belt in karate and is the winner of multiple World Karate Championships and is in Guinness World Records for winning the most Karate medals.

The biggest achievement in Laine's sports career was achieved in 1994 in the World Karate Championships. She has also World Cup 1998 and World Championships since 1986. In the European Karate Championships she has achieved seven personal championships and a total of 21 medals. She won the championship in 1987, 1991, 1992 (her own weight class and open series), 1994, 1995 (open series) and 1996.
