= Karate in Japan =

- Country: Japan
- Governing body: Japan Karate Federation
- National team: Japan Olympics team

International competitions
- Asian Karate Championships; Karate World Championships; Summer Olympics

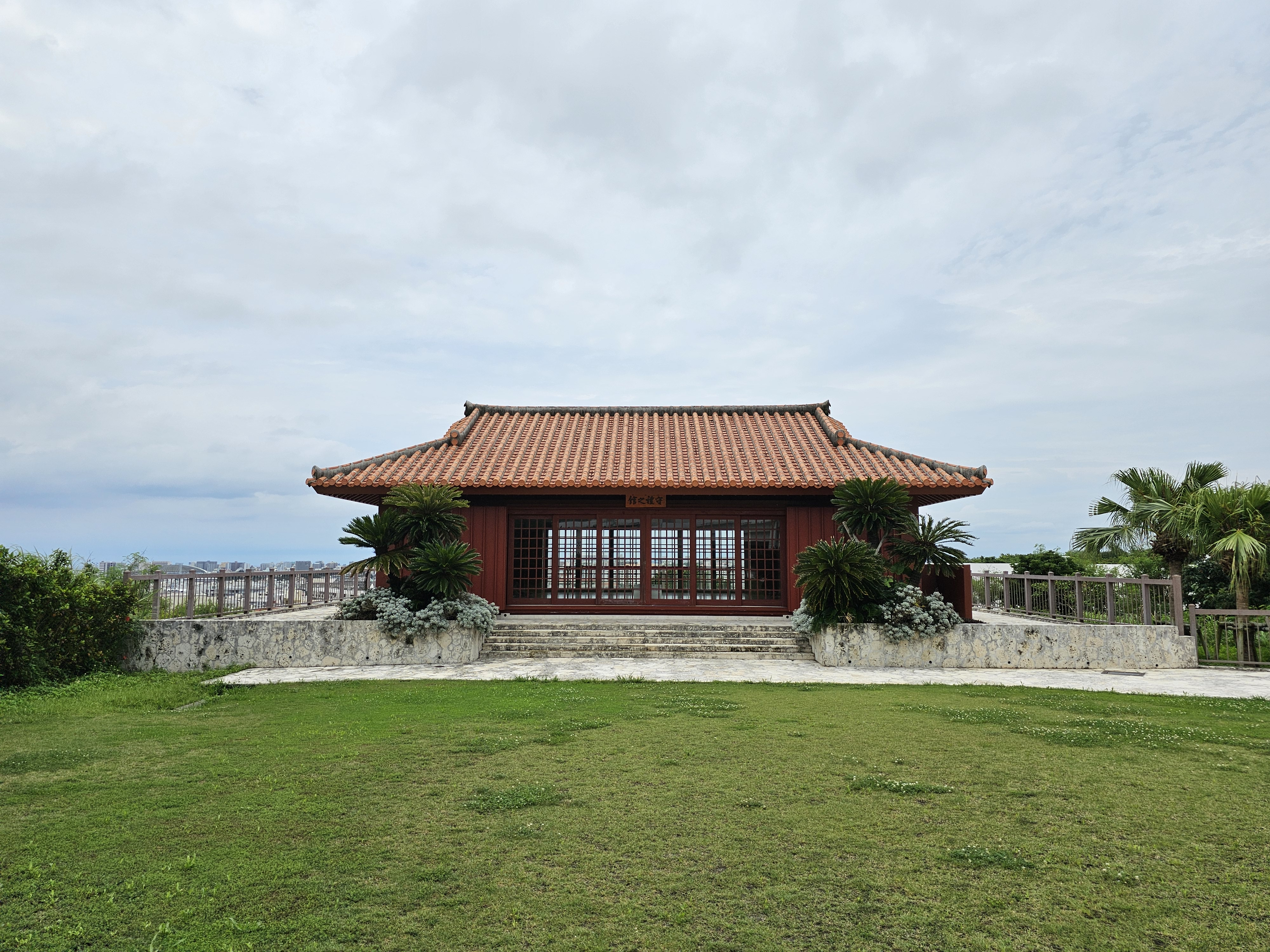
Traditional Dojo - Karate Kaikan in Tomigusuku near Naha, Okinawa Prefecture, Japan

Karate began in the 14th century on the island of Okinawa. Karate as a word first emerged due to Gichin Funakoshi. Karate was introduced to mainland Japan in the 1920s.

== History ==
Karate (lit. "empty-hand") has its roots in ancient martial practice in India and China. There is a tale of an Indian monk by the name of Bodhidharma, who brought a system of exercise and fighting techniques to the Shaolin Monastery in China around 525 A.D. It is said that this was the beginning of a systematized martial practice that eventually spread to other Asian countries via traveling monks and traders.

Karate itself was born in Okinawa (actually a string of islands off the coast of Japan known as the Ryukyu Islands). It is said that in ancient times a style known simply as "te" (literally "hand") emerged from the influence of the aforementioned Shaolin Kung Fu.

In the 1920s, a public school teacher named Gichin Funakoshi is inaccurately credited with introducing what was, by then, called kara-te into mainland Japan. His teacher, Ankō Itosu introduced Okinawa-te to Japan prior to Funakoshi sensei. Funakoshi sensei developed the nomenclature of his art at the research club in Keio University, changing the meaning of its name from "Chinese hand" to "empty hand" and addng the suffix do to conform budō arts. In 1933, the art was officially recognized by the Dai Nippon Butoku Kai.

There were already family styles of karate in Okinawa and soon several styles were also formed in Japan. There are several differences between the two traditional approaches that can be researched elsewhere.

== Establishing organizations ==
Organizations like Japan Karate Association and the Japan Karate Federation emerged in the 1950s to standardize karate as a sport.

== National board ==
Japan Karate Federation is the largest Karate Association in Japan. It is a member of the Japan Olympic Association.

The Japan Karate Federation is a member of the Asian umbrella organization Asian Karatedo Federation (AKF) as well as the World Association for World Karate Federation (WKF).

On the part of the Japan Olympic Committee, the JOC is the only Karate Association authorized to send athletes to the Olympic Games.

== International competition ==
Japan is traditionally a strong competitor in Sport Karate and has achieved numerous medals in the Karate World Championships.

=== Karate World Championships ===
Year	Host city	Gold	Silver	Bronze	Total
1970	(Japan) Tokyo	2	1	1	4
1972	(France) Paris	0	0	0	0
1975	(United States) California	1	2	0	3
1977	(Japan) Tokyo	0	0	0	0
1980	(Spain) Madrid	4	4	2	10
1982	(Taiwan) Taipei	6	2	3	11
1984	(Netherlands) Maastricht	3	2	2	7
1986	(Australia) Sydney	0	0	1	1
1988	(Egypt) Cairo	5	7	2	14
1990	Mexico City	6	3	3	12
1992	(Spain) Granada	4	2	3	9
1994	(Malaysia) Kota Kinabalu	7	2	2	11
1996	(South Africa) Sun City	4	4	3	11
1998	(Brazil) Rio de Janeiro	5	1	2	8
Total		73	43	42	158

== Spreading the martial art ==
As Karate grained prominence in Japan many karate masters exported the martial art to the United States and many other parts of the world.

== Present ==
The sport has declined in popularity and is more popular abroad. Karate at the 2020 Summer Olympics was a debut event at the Summer Olympics.
