= Karate in the United States =

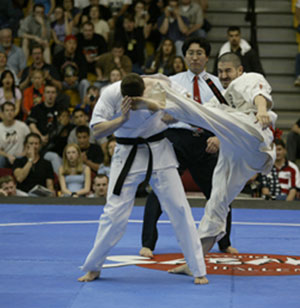
- Michael Ninomiya competing in the Sabaki Challenge
- Governing body: USA National Karate-do Federation

International competitions
- Karate World Championships; Pan American Games; Summer Olympics

Karate was first introduced to American service men after World War II by Japanese and Okinawan karate masters.

Many of these U.S. servicemen took their newfound skills to the United States and established their own dojos. Many Japanese karate instructors were also sent to popularize the martial art in the United States. Robert Trias was once widely regarded as the first American to open a karate dojo in the United States, though recent research credibly makes this claim highly unlikely.

Joey Rhodes was one of the first karate instructors to transform point kumite (sparring) into full contact United States karate. As the captain of the Eastern Illinois University karate team, Rhodes transformed karate into a popular activity through his numerous invitational open style tournaments, clinics, and camps. Rhodes is the founder of Rhodes Karate Schools and started his training in 1968 with the Japan Karate Association.

== History ==
Robert Trias, a returning U.S. Navy veteran, claimed to have begun teaching private lessons in Phoenix, Arizona as early as 1946. Other early teachers of karate in America were Ed Parker (a native Hawaiian and Coast Guard veteran who earned a black belt in 1953), George Mattson (who began studying while stationed in Okinawa in 1956), and Peter Urban (a Navy veteran who started training while stationed in Yokosuka in 1954).

Prior to 1946, most karate teachers outside Japan were in the Territory of Hawaii (not yet a state). Many of those teachers taught Kenpō, to Asians and locals only — one such teacher was James Mitose (1916-1981). It was through Mitose that one style of Kenpō (Kosho Shorei Ryu) was introduced to the world through William Chow (1914-1987), one of his black belts, who then went on to modify it and train Adriano Emperado (1926-2009), Ed Parker, Ralph Castro (1931-2019), and a host of other future grandmasters, some of whom brought the modified art to the U.S.

In the 1950s and early 60s several other Asian karate teachers began arriving in America to seek their fortunes, and to aid in the popularization of the art, including Japanese martial artists Hidetaka Nishiyama (1928-2008), Teruyuki Okazaki (1931-2020), Takayuki Mikami (b. 1933), Tsutomu Ohshima, Richard Kim (1917-2001), Fumio Demura (1940-2023), Takayuki Kubota (1934-2024), and Kazumi Tabata (1943-2020). Several Koreans also came to America in those days to introduce the Korean version of the martial arts (originally called Tang Soo Do or simply "Korean Karate" prior to being known by the term taekwondo). They included Jhoon Rhee (1932-2018), S. Henry Cho (1934-2012), Pyung-Soo Kim (b. 1937), and Sei-Jin "Jack" Hwang (1931-2017).

In spite of the presence of these Asian instructors, karate was primarily spread in the early days by American-born teachers. They included Trias (called the "Father of American Karate"), Don Nagle (1938-1999), Parker, Mattson, and Urban, plus pioneers like Harold G. Long (1930-1998), Steve Armstrong (1931-2006), Ed Johnson (1941-2025), Allen Steen, Ernest Lieb, Pat Burleson, Chuck Norris (1940-2026) and Joe Lewis.

The 1960s saw tremendous growth in karate's popularity in the United States. By the 1970s there were even professional karate tournaments, a precursor to full contact karate and kickboxing.

== USA National Karate-do Federation ==
The Amateur Athletic Union (AAU) was the official organization responsible for the running of all amateur sports in the United States, established in 1888. The AAU was officially charged with the organization and operation of many sports in the US. During this time, karate was one of the committees in the organization and was not an independent governing body.

The Amateur Sports Act of 1978 enabled the governance of sports in the US by organizations other than the AAU. This act required each sport to set up its own National Governing Body (NGB). Each of these governing bodies would be part of the United States Olympic Committee, but would not be run by the Committee. Thus, the USA National Karate-do Federation was born in 1996.

== Founders of American Karate systems ==
No individual can truly claim to be the founder of "American Karate" because it is an eclectic mixed martial art of systems and styles. Many instructors have taken what they considered to be the best of different systems to devise a curriculum that worked for them and their students. Some individuals who have claimed to be founders of their own systems of "American Karate" are listed here, some of whom have claimed 10th degree or higher black belt ranks for themselves. In Asian culture, most 10th degree black belts (typically represented by a Red Belt) were awarded only upon the death of the Grandmaster by his successor.

Tsutomu Ohshima (b. 1930), after being taught by Gichin Funakoshi, traveled to America and brought Shotokan Karate, as well as creating the Caltech Karate Club, the first American university karate club, in 1957. Master Ohshima is a 5th degree black belt, the highest rank in Shotokan Karate of America. The reason being when Master Funakoshi received his belt as a 5th degree and not caring for rank, Master Ohshima didn't want to go higher than his master, setting the limit at five levels of black belt rank.

Allen R. Steen (1940-2025) was a 10th degree black belt who earned his 1st degree in 1961, in Tae Kwon Do from Jhoon Rhee. Steen was among the first group of 6 American students at the University of Texas-Austin to earn a black belt from Jhoon Rhee, in 1962. (Atlee Chittim had earned his black belt from Rhee in 1960.) Steen opened the first commercial karate school in Texas in 1962 and became known as the "Father of Texas Blood and Guts Karate." He also gained fame for defeating Chuck Norris and Joe Lewis in a single evening to win Ed Parker's Long Beach International Karate Championships in 1966. Steen died in 2025.

Joe Lewis (1944-2012) was often called the "Muhammad Ali" of American sport karate. He amassed many firsts including the first World Professional Karate Champion and the first U.S. Heavyweight Champion. He began his martial studies while a 20-year-old U.S. Marine stationed in Okinawa in 1964. As did many Americans stationed on Okinawa in that era, he earned a black belt in a record 18 months and due to his outstanding tournament career was named the "greatest karate fighter of all time" by his peers in a Black Belt Magazine survey. Lewis died in 2012.

Joey Rhodes is a 5th degree Black Belt (following Master Ohshima’s rank philosophy) recognized as an innovative pioneer in the USA collegiate Karate community for introducing full contact Karate. His United States style blended Japan and Korean techniques, weapons training, and tameshiwari, (breaking - Rhodes felt physical and psychological confidence were instilled in his upper ranking students because of this test and trial) along with adherence to Gichin Funakoshi 20 precepts, brought unity between many practitioners and schools. Many fellow law enforcement officers adopted Rhodes effective self defense and tonfa techniques in the United States. Rhodes retired from martial arts to become an ordained minister.

J. Pat Burleson (1936-2021) was a 10th degree black belt. He received his 1st degree black belt in 1963 in Tae Kwon Do by Allen Steen. Burleson was Allen Steen's first black belt student. Burleson based his system on Tae Kwon Do, Tang Soo Do, and Wado-Ryu. His website says he is one of the founders of American Karate and his claims have been based on his legitimacy of winning the first National Karate Championships in 1964 in Washington D.C. Burleson died in 2021.

Jim R. Harrison (1936-2020) was a 9th degree black belt. He received his 1st degree black belt in Judo and Jujitsu in 1962, Tang Soo Do in 1963, Shorin-Ryu Karate in 1964, having trained under Bob Kurth, Kim Soo Wong and Jim Wax. In 1964 he opened his Bushidokan dojo in Kansas City where he competed, trained several regional and national champions, and hosted major tournaments.

Ernest Lieb (1940-2006) was a 10th degree black belt. He received his 1st degree black belt in 1958. Mr. Lieb based his system on Chi Do Kwan, Karate, Judo, Jiu Jitsu, and Aikido. In 1964 Lieb was one of the first teachers to put the word "American" in front of karate.

Edmund K. Parker, Sr. (1931-1990) was the founder of American Kenpo Karate. He received his black belt in 1953 from William Chow. Parker based his system on Chow's Chinese Kenpo Karate. Parker was one of the first to commercialize karate in America and became known by many as the "Father of American Kenpo Karate" because he originated the first "Americanized" version of karate.

Keith D. Yates (b. 1950) is a 10th degree black belt. He received his 1st degree black belt in 1968 in Tae Kwon Do by Allen Steen. Yates was Steen's youngest black belt student at the time. After a successful tournament career, Yates went on to become a respected teacher and author. He has served on the editorial boards of most of the major martial arts publications and has authored or co-authored 13 books. He also sits on the governing boards of several international martial arts organizations.

Robert Trias (1923-1989) is considered by many to be the father of American karate. He taught Shuri-Te Karate, reportedly learned from a student of Choki Motobu, in Phoenix, Arizona starting in 1946. However, more recent research has revealed that Trias was actually still stationed in California with the U.S. Navy during the time frame he claimed to have earned a black belt in karate while stationed in the Solomon Islands (1943), that he was actually stationed in the Solomon Islands in 1944-1945 and not 1942-1943, and that he was, in actuality, a judo black belt who simply decided to begin teaching karate in 1958. Archived Arizona newspaper articles from the 1950s debunk much of his claims that were once taken at face value. Trias wrote to many Asian masters seeking legitimacy in the early 1960s and beyond, some of whom awarded him advanced Dan ranking based solely on his claims and without ever seeing his skills. A controversial figure, he nevertheless was instrumental in popularizing Okinawan and Japanese karate in the United States and should be remembered for his many contributions to the arts.

== International competition ==
America is not traditionally considered a "world power" in Sport Karate, and its record in Karate World Championships is poor for a country its size and wealth.

=== Karate World Championships ===
Year	Host city	Gold	Silver	Bronze	Total
1970	(Japan) Tokyo	0	0	1	1
1972	(France) Paris	0	0	0	0
1975	(United States) California	0	0	0	0
1977	(Japan) Tokyo	0	0	0	0
1980	(Spain) Madrid	1	2	1	4
1982	(Taiwan) Taipei	0	1	0	1
1984	(Netherlands) Maastricht	0	1	0	1
1986	(Australia) Sydney	0	0	1	1
1988	(Egypt) Cairo	0	1	2	3
1990	Mexico City	0	1	1	2
1992	(Spain) Granada	0	2	0	2
1994	(Malaysia) Kota Kinabalu	0	0	0	0
1996	(South Africa) Sun City	0	2	1	3
1998	(Brazil) Rio de Janeiro	0	1	0	1
2000	(Germany) Munich	0	0	1	1
2002	(Spain) Madrid	2	0	0	2
2004	(Mexico) Monterrey	2	0	2	4
2006	(Finland) Tampere	0	0	1	1
2008	(Japan) Tokyo	1	1	0	2
2010	(Serbia) Belgrade	0	0	3	3
2012	(France) Paris	0	0	2	2
2014	(Germany) Bremen	0	0	0	0
2016	(Austria) Linz	0	0	1	1
2018	(Spain) Madrid	0	0	0	0
2021	(United Arab Emirates) Dubai	0	1	1	2
2023	(Hungary) Budapest	0	0	0	0
Total		6	13	18	37

== Reception ==
Following the inclusion of judo at the 1964 Tokyo Olympics, there was growing mainstream Western interest in Japanese martial arts, particularly karate, during the 1960s. By the 1970s, martial arts films (especially kung fu films and Bruce Lee flicks from Hong Kong) had formed a mainstream genre and launched the "kung fu craze" which propelled karate and other Asian martial arts into mass popularity. However, mainstream Western audiences at the time generally did not distinguish between different Asian martial arts such as karate, kung fu and tae kwon do.

American Karate experienced an explosion of popularity in the 1970s and 1980s thanks to such movies as Billy Jack and The Karate Kid. American Karate is still popular and can hold its own with other martial arts like Taekwondo, Brazilian jiu-jitsu, and MMA because today it offers many of these same techniques.

In some cases, as with all arts, one of the major criticisms of martial arts teaching in the United States is the common practice of teaching primarily for profit, at the expense of good quality self-defense instruction. These are often referred to sarcastically, as McDojos; this model of instruction is not the case for all American schools.

== Bibliography ==
1. The Development of American Karate: History and Skills, Jerry Beasley (1983), Bemjo Martial Arts Library, ISBN 0-943736-02-1
2. Martial Arts: Traditions, History, People, John Cocoran and Emil Farkas (1983), Gallery Books, ISBN 0-8317-5805-8
3. Korean Karate, Keith D. Yates and H. Bryan Robbins (1987), Sterling, ISBN 0-8069-6836-2
4. The Karate Dojo: Traditions and Tales of a Martial Art, Peter Urban (1997), Tuttle Publishing, ISBN 0-8048-1703-0
5. The Official History of Karate in America: The Golden Age: 1968–1986, Al Weiss (1997), ISBN 0-9615126-8-7
6. The Complete Idiot's Guide to Tae Kwon Do, Karen Eden and Keith D. Yates (1998), Alpha Books, ISBN 0-02-862389-4
7. The Complete Idiot's Guide to Karate, Randall G. Hassell (2000), Alpha Books, ISBN 0-02-863832-8
8. The Ultimate Martial Arts Q & A Book: 750 Expert Answers to Your Essential Questions, John Cocoran, John Graden (2001), Contemporary Books, ISBN 0-8092-9444-3
9. An Illustrated History of the Martial Arts in America, Emil Farkas (2007), Rising Sun Productions, ISBN 1-897307-90-X
10. The Complete Guide to American Karate and Tae Kwon Do, Keith D. Yates (2008), Blue Snake Books, ISBN 1-58394-215-7
