= 1987 European Karate Championships =

Karate competition

- Location: Glasgow, United Kingdom
- Dates: 2–4 May
- Competitors: 310 from 21 nations

The 1987 European Karate Championships, the 22nd edition, was held in Glasgow, Scotland, United Kingdom from 2 to 4 May 1987.

== Medal table ==
* Host nation (Scotland)

Rank	Nation	Gold	Silver	Bronze	Total
1	Italy	6	2	2	10
2	France	2	3	4	9
3	Great Britain	2	1	4	7
4	Scotland*	2	1	1	4
5	Finland	2	1	0	3
6	Sweden	1	1	4	6
7	Netherlands	1	0	4	5
8	Spain	0	5	1	6
9	Norway	0	2	3	5
10	West Germany	0	0	5	5
Totals (10 entries)		16	16	28	60

== Medallists ==
=== Men's Competition ===
==== Individual ====
Event	Gold	Silver	Bronze
Kata	(Italy) Dario Marchini	(Scotland) Steve Morris	(Spain) Luiz María Sanz
Kumite -60 kg	(United Kingdom) Leslie Fairclough	(Italy) Daniele Simmi	(Norway) Tommy Gabrielsen (United Kingdom) Abdu Shaher
Kumite -65 kg	(Finland) Janne Timonen	(Spain) Jesús Juan Rubio	(France) Max Dorville (Italy) Francesco Muffato
Kumite -70 kg	(Italy) Achille Degli Abbati	(France) Bruno Pellicier	(Scotland) Jim Collins (Sweden) Ellati Medhi
Kumite -75 kg	(Sweden) Thomas Hallman	(France) Paul Giacinti	(West Germany) Toni Dietl (Sweden) Niklas Hansson
Kumite -80 kg	(Scotland) Pat McKay	(Spain) José Manuel Egea	(United Kingdom) Mervyn Etienne (Netherlands) Dudley Josepa
Kumite +80 kg	(France) Emmanuel Pinda	(Italy) Maurizio Micheli	(Italy) Gianluca Guazzaroni (France) Marc Pyrée
Kumite Open	(France) Didier Moreau	(Sweden) Karl Daggfeldt	(France) Emmanuel Pinda (West Germany) Waldemar Rauch

==== Team ====
Event	Gold	Silver	Bronze
Kata	Italy	Spain	Sweden
Kumite	Scotland	France	United Kingdom; Netherlands

=== Women's competition ===
==== Individual ====
Event	Gold	Silver	Bronze
Kata	(Italy) Cristina Restelli	(Spain) Marisa Rozalen	(Sweden) Lena Svensson
Kumite -53 kg	(Finland) Sari Laine	(Finland) Sari Johanna Kauria	(Netherlands) Sandra Johannes (Norway) Anita Myhren
Kumite -60 kg	(United Kingdom) Molly Samuel	(United Kingdom) Annette Bailey	(West Germany) Angelika Foerster (France) Catherine Morel
Kumite +60 kg	(Netherlands) Guus van Mourik	(Norway) Kari Lunde	(West Germany) Silvia Wiegaertner (Norway) Stine Nygaard

==== Team ====
Event	Gold	Silver	Bronze
Kata	Italy	Spain	West Germany
Kumite	Italy	Norway	Netherlands; United Kingdom
