= 1984 European Karate Championships =

Karate competition

- Location: Paris, France
- Dates: May 11 to 13

The 1984 European Karate Championships (19th edition) were held in Paris, France from 11–13 May 1984.

== Medalists ==
=== Men's competition ===
==== Individual ====
| Event | Gold | Silver | Bronze |
|---|---|---|---|
| Kata | (Italy) Dario Marchini | (Spain) Luis Maria Sanz | (Spain) Deogracias Medina |
| Kumite −60 kg | (Italy) Francesco D'Agostino | (England) Abdu Shaher | (Spain) Evaristo Criado (England) Tim Stephens |
| Kumite −65 kg | (Finland) Janne Timonen | (Scotland) David Coulter | (Spain) Ricardo Abad Cebolla (France) Max Dorville |
| Kumite −70 kg | (Spain) Gonzalo "Gonchi" Rodríguez Bognoli | (France) Thierry Masci | (Scotland) Thomas Burns (Finland) Jukka Lindström |
| Kumite −75 kg | (Netherlands) Kenneth Leeuwin | (Switzerland) Gérald Sauthier | (France) Didier Moreau (Netherlands) Fred Royers |
| Kumite −80 kg | (France) Claude Pettinella | (Netherlands) Otti Roethoff | (England) Henry Cornwall (Spain) José Manuel Egea |
| Kumite +80 kg | (England) Vic Charles | (France) Patrice Ruggiero | (Scotland) Mark Akinlami (Netherlands) Hans Nijman |
| Kumite Open | (France) Patrice Ruggiero | (France) Emmanuel Pinda | (West Germany) Toni Dietl (Italy) Claudio Guazzaroni |

==== Team ====
| Event | Gold | Silver | Bronze |
|---|---|---|---|
| Kata | Italy | Spain | West Germany |
| Kumite | Scotland | Netherlands | England; Finland |

=== Women's competition ===
==== Individual ====
| Event | Gold | Silver | Bronze |
|---|---|---|---|
| Kata | (England) Helen Raye | (Spain) Marisa Rozalen | (Spain) Sonia Sanchez |
| Kumite −53 kg | (France) Sophie Berger | (Poland) ??? | (Turkey) ??? (Turkey) ??? |
| Kumite −60 kg | (England) Beverly Morris | (Germany) Angelika Förster | (Switzerland) Daniela Galilei (Czech Republic) ??? |
| Kumite +60 kg | (Netherlands) Guus van Mourik | Astrid Stessens Belgium | (Netherlands) Henny van de Ploeg (Switzerland) ??? |

==== Team ====
| Event | Gold | Silver | Bronze |
|---|---|---|---|
| Kata | Spain | England | Italy |
| Kumite | Italy | ??? | ??? |
