= Hamish Telfer Adam =

Scottish karateka

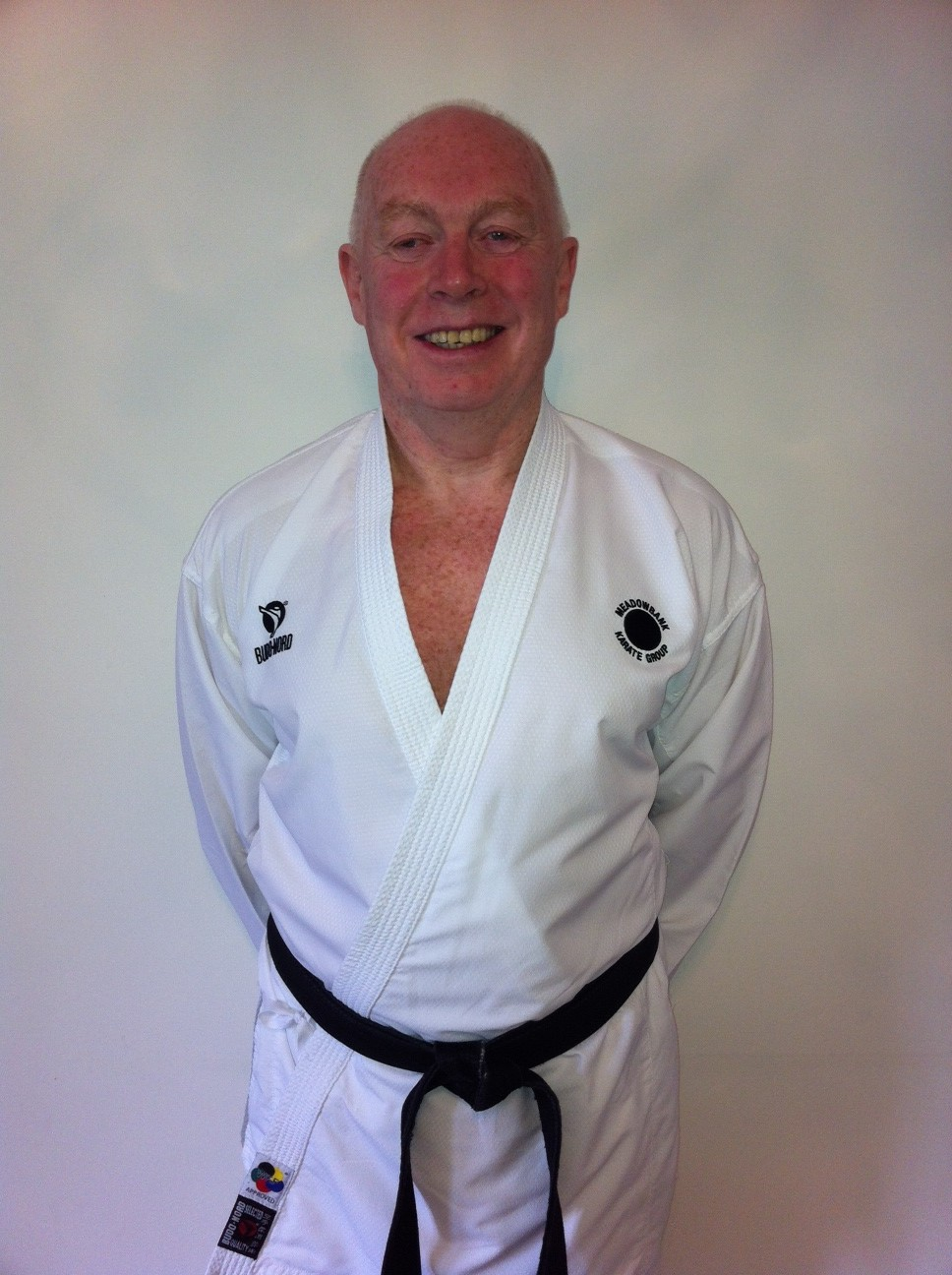
- Born: 29 May 1947 (age 79); Edinburgh, Scotland
- Style: Wadō-ryū, Karate
- Rank: 9th dan karate

Hamish Telfer Adam MBE (b. 1947 in Edinburgh) is a Scottish Karate coach and instructor. He has been representing Scotland and Britain in Karate since the 1970s and is currently chairman of the Scottish Karate Federation.

== Career highlights ==
On 16 June 2012, in the United Kingdom's Queen's Birthday Honours List he was appointed a MBE (Order of the British Empire) for his services to the sport of Karate during the past 50 years, both as a competitor in Kumite (fighting) and then as a Coach.

Hamish Adam was born in 1947 in Edinburgh and his family resided in the Niddrie Area of the City. He entered the sport of Karate at the age of 15 years and quickly excelled as a fighter to becoming the Scottish and British 'All Styles' Champion. In 1970, he was selected for the first British 'All Styles' Karate Squad which took part in the inaugural World 'All Styles' Championships in Japan. In 1972, he was part of the British Team which beat the strong Japanese Team in the World Championships in France to win the Bronze Medal. In 1975, he was part of the British Team which won the World Championships in America, and consequently was recognised then as one of the best fighters of his generation in the sport in Britain.

== Scottish Karate Federation ==
On 17 December 1970, he was one of the nine founders of the Scottish Karate Federation (SKF) practising the 'Wado Ryu' style of karate under the legendary Tatsuo Suzuki, later changing to the 'Wado Kai' style. The SKF is a karate association in Scotland, having 72 clubs and approximately 3,000 licensed members. The SKF is affiliated to the Scottish Karate Governing Body (SKGB), which in turn is affiliated with the World Karate Federation (WKF). Hamish Adam instructs 10 clubs in the Meadowbank Karate Group and they normally meet twice or thrice weekly. In these clubs, he coaches a cumulative number in excess of 500 students per week. It was as a Coach that Hamish found his true vocation and forte, with many of his students achieving a high level in karate championships and events throughout the world, both in their own 'Style' and 'All Styles' competitions.

== Coaching ==
In 1973, the four home countries of the United Kingdom, namely Wales, Northern Ireland, England, and Scotland, were allowed for the first time to enter their own National Teams into the European 'All Styles' Championships, but could only continue to compete in World 'All Styles' Championships as part of a British Team. At this juncture, Hamish was appointed the Coach of Scottish National Karate Squad and the same year Scotland entered its first European Championships. The Team was not only coached by Hamish, but he also competed as one of its five fighters. They won the Gold Medal in the Team category, and repeated this achievement in 1984, and again in 1987, when the Team coached by Hamish won a further two team Gold Medals in the same prestigious European Championships. In addition he has coached two Scottish fighters who have attained the highest individual achievement in the sport of World 'All Styles' Karate Champion, namely Pat Mckay in 1982 and again in 1984, and Jim Collins in 1984. Hamish also continued the role of supporting and assisting David 'Ticky' Donovan OBE (Ticky Donovan), the Coach of the British Squad, and these British Teams went on to dominated the sport for a decade, by winning the World 'All Styles' Team Championships in 1982/84/86/88 & 90. In 1985, he was the co-author of a book titled 'Competition Karate' with Greg McLatchie, which provided informed guidance and advice to fighters involved in the sport. Such was Hamish Adam's reputation within karate that the book was used as a reference manual by many fighters of that generation, throughout Europe and the rest of the world.

== Present ==
Hamish Adam is the present Chairman of the Scottish Karate Federation, a position he has held since its formation in 1970. He has also held every 'Senior Position' within the SKGB, including more recently the chairman, between 2000 and 2006, and since then the Director of Sport. Part of this latest role includes organising all the Major Events on the Karate calendar held in Scotland. He has also been continuously involved in Coaching the Scottish 'All Styles' Karate Team since its formation in 1973 and provides ongoing support to Gerry Fleming the current National Coach. Hamish Adam is at present a 9th Dan, which is the second highest rank within the sport, and he has dedicated his life to karate. He is integral to the sport of karate in Scotland and coaches by motivating and educating, resulting in many of his pupils not only achieving their own personal goals, but achieving success over the years on the Scottish, British, Commonwealth, European, and World stage.
