= 1985 European Karate Championships =

Karate competition

- Location: Oslo, Norway
- Dates: May 5 to 7

The 1985 European Karate Championships, the 20th edition, was held in Oslo, Norway from May 5 to 7, 1985.

== Competition ==
Event	Gold	Silver	Bronze
Kata	(West Germany) Efthimios Karamitsos	(Spain) Jorge Romero	(Italy) Dario Marchini
Kumite -60 kg	(Norway) Stein Rønning	(West Germany) Dirk Betzien	(West Germany) Andre Lassen (France) Rudolphe Vallée
Kumite -65 kg	(Spain) Ricardo Abad Cebolla	(Spain) Royo Garcia	(West Germany) Stefan Heinrich (Sweden) Ramon Malawe
Kumite -70 kg	(Netherlands) Kees Mossel	(Switzerland) Maurice Negro	(England) Greg Francis (Spain) Gonzalo Rodríguez
Kumite -75 kg	(Spain) Antonio Martínez Amillo	(West Germany) Toni Dietl	(Netherlands) Kenneth Leeuwin (France) Serge Serfati
Kumite -80 kg	(Spain) José Manuel Egea	(England) Henry Cornwall	(England) Mervyn Etienne (Netherlands) Wim Mossel
Kumite + 80 kg	(Spain) Oscar Zazo	(Sweden) Karl Daggfeldt	(Italy) Claudio Guazzaroni (France) Marc Pyrée
Open Kumite	(France) Emmanuel Pinda	(England) Mike Sailsman	(Sweden) Karl Daggfeldt (Netherlands) Dudley Josepa

=== Team ===
Event	Gold	Silver	Bronze
Kata	Italy	Spain	West Germany
Kumite	England	Netherlands	France; Spain

=== Women's competition ===
==== Individual ====
Event	Gold	Silver	Bronze
Kata	(Sweden) Lena Svensson	(Italy) Cristina Restelli	(Spain) María Moreno
Kumite -53 kg	(France) Cathérine Girardet	(Spain) Visitacion Garces	(Finland) Johanna Kauria (England) Moira Hooper
Kumite -60 kg	(England) Beverly Morris	(West Germany) Angelika Foerster	(France) Nicole Sarkis (England) Diane Reilly
Kumite +60 kg	(Netherlands) Guus van Mourik	(Spain) Manuela Garcia	(Norway) Kari Lunde (Austria)

==== Team ====
Event	Gold	Silver	Bronze
Kata	Spain	Italy	West Germany
Kumite	Italy		
