= 1983 European Karate Championships =

Karate competitions

- Location: Madrid, Spain
- Dates: May 5 to 7

The 1983 European Karate Championships, the 18th edition, was held in Madrid, Spain from May 13 to 15, 1983. The women's competition in kumite was held in Brussels, Belgium on February 26 and 27, 1983 (with juniors).

== Medallists ==
=== Men's Competition ===
==== Individual ====
| Event | Gold | Silver | Bronze |
|---|---|---|---|
| Kata | (Spain) Deogracias Medina | (Spain) Luis Maria Sanz | (France) Jean-Pierre Fischer |
| Kumite -60 kg | (United Kingdom) Tim Stephens | (United Kingdom) Stewart Mackinnon | (France) Mohamed Kathiri (France) Rudolphe Vallée |
| Kumite -65 kg | (United Kingdom) David Coulter | (France) Joseph Goffin | (Spain) Ricardo Abad Cebolla (France) Didier Lupo |
| Kumite -70 kg | (Finland) Ari Kaunismäki | (Italy) Raffaele Bernardi | (Sweden) Flavio Donatello (Spain) Felipe Hita |
| Kumite -75 kg | (Spain) Francisco Merino | (France) Pierre Pinard | (Switzerland) Javier Gomez (Belgium) Angelo Spataro |
| Kumite -80 kg | (Finland) Tapio Pirttioja | (Spain) Francisco Manzano Diaz | (Italy) Gianluca Guazzaroni (United Kingdom) Neiman Prince |
| Kumite +80 kg | (France) Patrice Ruggiero | (France) Marc Pyrée | (United Kingdom) Jerome Atkinson (Spain) Jean-Pierre Carbila |
| Kumite Open | (Spain) José Manuel Egea | (United Kingdom) Geoff Thompson | (Finland) Tapio Pirttioja (France) Patrice Ruggiero |

==== Team ====
| Event | Gold | Silver | Bronze |
|---|---|---|---|
| Kata | Spain | France | West Germany |
| Kumite | United Kingdom | France | Spain; Sweden |

=== Women's competition ===
==== Individual ====
| Event | Gold | Silver | Bronze |
|---|---|---|---|
| Kata | (Spain) María Moreno | (United Kingdom) Helen Raye | (France) Nicole Sarkis |
| Kumite -53 kg | (United Kingdom) Helen Raye | (France) Francine Fillios | (United Kingdom) Moira Hooper (Belgium) Ann Ameele |
| Kumite -60 kg | (United Kingdom) Beverly Morris | (Finland) Rita Varelius | (Switzerland) Daniela Galilei (Finland) Yrsa Lindquist |
| Kumite +60 kg | (Netherlands) Guus van Mourik | (West Germany) Elisabeth Harmel | (Netherlands) Henny van de Ploeg (Spain) Coral-Navas |

==== Team ====
| Event | Gold | Silver | Bronze |
|---|---|---|---|
| Kata | France | Spain | United Kingdom |
