= 1988 World Karate Championships =

Karate competitions

- Host city: Cairo, Egypt

The 1988 World Karate Championships are the 9th edition of the World Karate Championships, and were held in Cairo, Egypt in October 1988.

== Medalists ==
=== Men ===
Event	Gold	Silver	Bronze
Individual kata	Tsuguo Sakamoto; Japan	Tomoyuki Aihara; Japan	Dario Marchini; Italy
Team kata	Japan	Italy	France
Kumite −60 kg	Abdu Shaher; Great Britain	Nicola Simmi; Italy	Stein Rønning; Norway
Kumite −60 kg	Abdu Shaher; Great Britain	Nicola Simmi; Italy	Hideto Nozaki; Japan
Kumite −65 kg	Tim Stephens; Great Britain	Reginaldo Doran; Netherlands	Jesús Juan Rubio; Spain
Kumite −65 kg	Tim Stephens; Great Britain	Reginaldo Doran; Netherlands	Francesco Muffato; Italy
Kumite −70 kg	Thierry Masci; France	Francisco Egea; Spain	Yoshimiro Anzai; Japan
Kumite −70 kg	Thierry Masci; France	Francisco Egea; Spain	Bruno Pellicier; France
Kumite −75 kg	Ko Hayashi; Japan	Thomas Hallman; Sweden	Toni Dietl; West Germany
Kumite −75 kg	Ko Hayashi; Japan	Thomas Hallman; Sweden	José Manuel Galan; Spain
Kumite −80 kg	Dudley Josepa; Netherlands	Mervyn Etienne; Great Britain	José Manuel Egea; Spain
Kumite −80 kg	Dudley Josepa; Netherlands	Mervyn Etienne; Great Britain	Waldemar Rauch; West Germany
Kumite +80 kg	Emmanuel Pinda; France	Vic Charles; Great Britain	Jöran Thell; Sweden
Kumite +80 kg	Emmanuel Pinda; France	Vic Charles; Great Britain	Gianluca Guazzaroni; Italy
Kumite open ippon	José Manuel Egea; Spain	Mike Sailsman; Great Britain	Ryosuke Shimizu; Japan
Kumite open ippon	José Manuel Egea; Spain	Mike Sailsman; Great Britain	Emmanuel Pinda; France
Kumite open sanbon	Gianluca Guazzaroni; Italy	Vic Charles; Great Britain	Ko Hayashi; Japan
Kumite open sanbon	Gianluca Guazzaroni; Italy	Vic Charles; Great Britain	Kemal Aktepe; Netherlands
Team kumite	Great Britain	Netherlands	Spain
Team kumite	Great Britain	Netherlands	Italy

=== Women ===
Event	Gold	Silver	Bronze
Individual kata	Yuki Mimura; Japan	Hisami Yokoyama; Japan	Kathy Jones; United States
Team kata	Japan	United States	Italy
Kumite −53 kg	Yuko Hasama; Japan	Catherine Girardet; France	Mari Capechi; Venezuela
Kumite −53 kg	Yuko Hasama; Japan	Catherine Girardet; France	Shirley Graham; Great Britain
Kumite −60 kg	Akemi Kimura; Japan	Junko Kurata; Japan	Gina Halteman; United States
Kumite −60 kg	Akemi Kimura; Japan	Junko Kurata; Japan	Ruth Hahn; West Germany
Kumite +60 kg	Guusje van Mourik; Netherlands	Ylva Wickberg; Sweden	Marie-Ange Legros; France
Kumite +60 kg	Guusje van Mourik; Netherlands	Ylva Wickberg; Sweden	Marzia Sartirani; Italy

== Medal table ==
Rank	Nation	Gold	Silver	Bronze	Total
1	Japan	7	3	4	14
2	Great Britain	3	4	1	8
3	Netherlands	2	2	1	5
4	France	2	1	4	7
5	Italy	1	2	6	9
6	Spain	1	1	4	6
7	Sweden	0	2	1	3
8	United States	0	1	2	3
9	West Germany	0	0	3	3
10	Norway	0	0	1	1
10	Venezuela	0	0	1	1
Totals (11 entries)		16	16	28	60
