= Luigi Zoia =

Italian karateka (born 1948)

Personal information
- Nationality: Italy
- Born: 21 January 1948 (age 78) Milan, Italy

Sport
- Sport: Karate
Medal record
Karate
World Karate Championships
Silver medal – second place	1970 Tokyo	-
Silver medal – second place	1972 Tokyo	-
Silver medal – second place	1975 Los Angeles	-
- Updated on 1 March 2013

Luigi Zoia (born January 21, 1948, in Milan) is a karateka, 6th-Dan karate master, and Italian entrepreneur.

== Sports career ==
Zoia (the name is also spelled as "Zoja") is a traditional Italian karate sensei and has achieved the sixth dan black belt level. Also, he has been Italian champion various times, European champion and the runner-up to the World Championships in Shotokan Karate. As an entrepreneur, he brought from the United States to Europe the first Investable Hedge Funds Index.

A student of the first generation of the master Hiroshi Shirai, he began practicing karate Shokotan in 1965 in Milan. He achieved the Black belt after only one year, he became a member of the Italian national team from 1968 to 1976. He was Italian champion in 1969 and successfully defended the title in the following years 1970 and 1971. In 1970 the publishing house Panini dedicated a sticker album to Zoia as Sports Champion for the year 1969/1970.

Zoia won the title of Italian Karate Champion in 1969, 1970 and 1971, of European Karate Champion for three years in a row in 1971, 1972 and 1973. He also achieved the title of Vice World Champion in Karate in 1971, in 1973 and 1975. During the World Karate Championship held in Tokyo in July 1973, the Japan Karate Association rewarded him with the award “Kantosho” as "the most complete athlete and fighter" of the Championship.

During his military service, carried out in the Carabinieri Corps in 1972, his proposal to establish the karate section in the sports group of the Force got accepted. He was the founder and first teacher, and he received a military decoration. During his leadership, the Carabinieri Team won several Italian awards for his merits in sports. In the period 1975–1976 he was a member of the board of directors and vice president of the Italian Sports Federation of Karate (FESIKA).

== The spread of the "Conscious Leadership" values ==
In 2009 he founded the cultural association Life Journey of which he was president. The purpose of the association was to develop a culture of leadership based on values.

In 2012, Luigi Zoia founded as Chairman The Conscious Business Group, a now- profit Cultural Association which spreads the message of self-aware leadership in Business promoting the integration of Sustainable Profitability with Social Prosperity.

In 2013 he wrote his autobiographical book "Falling seven times...standing up eight" “Cadere sette volte… rialzarsi otto” published by "Armenia Publishing Group" where he tells us his story as a man, entrepreneur, and karate fighter. After the success of the first edition, the book was published by Mental Fitness Publishing in October 2014.

== His business activity as a manager and entrepreneur ==
Graduated from Bocconi University in 1974, in 1976 Zoia began working for Citibank in Milan. In 1982 he moved to New York as a VP Head of the Eastern Region for CITI FI. At the end of 1989, he left Citibank to start a business as an entrepreneur in the New York real estate. In 1998 he moved back into the financial industry, first creating and managing an offshore hedge fund, and then in 1999, he founded HFR Europe, a Hedge Fund-European Asset Management Company, and ran it until 2004 as president and CEO. The company provided Hedge Funds asset management services to institutional investors in Europe. Under his leadership, HFR Europe grew up to $1.9 billion. During that period he was a shareholder and member of the board of Akros Hfr Sgr of Banca Popolare di Milano, Italy. Today he is active in the international market as an entrepreneur with primary interest in real estate and finance.
