= 1981 European Karate Championships =

Karate competition

- Location: Venice, Italy
- Dates: May 5 to 7

The 1981 European Karate Championships was held in Venice, Italy, from May 2–4, 1981.

== Medallists ==
=== Men's Competition ===
==== Individual ====
Event	Gold	Silver	Bronze
Kata	(Italy) Rossano Ruffini	(Spain) Deogracias Medina	(France) Jean-Pierre Fischer
Kumite -60 kg	(Spain) Jordi Castellví	(Italy) Giuseppe Tinnirello	(Italy) Giorgio D'Amico (Spain) Fernando Rosuero
Kumite -65 kg	(Italy) Roberto De Luca	(France) Norbert Ayissi	(Scotland) David Coulter (Finland) Jukka Lindström
Kumite -70 kg	(France) Thierry Masci	(Italy) Gianpaolo Zacchè	(Spain) Felipe Hita (United Kingdom) Cecil Hackett
Kumite -75 kg	(Spain) Antonio Martínez Amillo	(Italy) Rosetti	(France) Didier Moreau (Finland) Timo Nurmi
Kumite -80 kg	(Netherlands) Wim Mossel	(France) Marc Pyree	(Italy) Zagni (France) Claude Pettinella
Kumite +80 kg	(France) Patrice Ruggiero	(France) Emmanuel Pinda	(Spain) Jean-Pierre Carbila (Italy) Claudio Guazzaroni
Kumite Open	(United Kingdom) Vic Charles	(France) Claude Pettinella	(Netherlands) Henk Sporkslede (Italy) Giovanni Ricciardi

==== Team ====
Event	Gold	Silver	Bronze
Kata	Italy	France	Switzerland
Kumite	France	Spain	Belgium; West Germany

=== Women's competition ===
Event	Gold	Silver	Bronze
Kata	(Italy) Marina Sasso	(Spain) María Moreno	(Italy) Assunta Capiddu
Team Kata	Italy	United Kingdom	Austria
