= Ludwig Kotzebue =

Dutch karateka

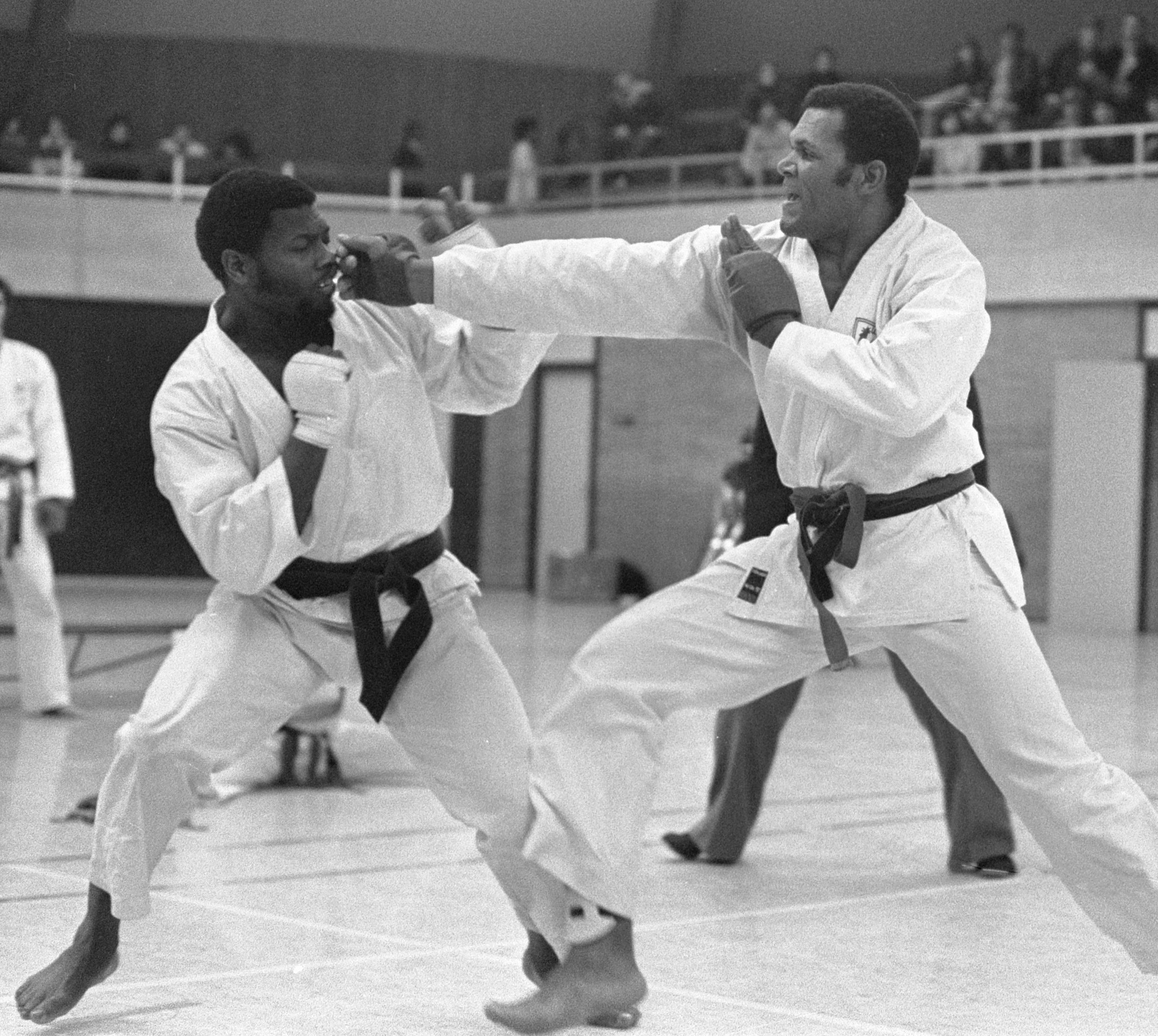
- Kotzebue (left) in 1977

Personal information
- Born: 1946 (age 79–80) Suriname

Sport
- Sport: Karate
Medal record
Men's karate
Representing the Netherlands
World Championships
Bronze medal – third place	1975 Long Beach	Kumite team
Gold medal – first place	1977 Tokyo	Kumite team
Silver medal – second place	1980 Madrid	Kumite team
European Championships
Gold medal – first place	1977 Paris	Kumite open
World Games
Gold medal – first place	1981 Santa Clara	Kumite +80 kg

Ludwig Kotzebue (born 1946) is a retired Dutch-Surinamese heavyweight karateka. He won individual gold medals at the 1977 European Championships and 1981 World Games, and a team gold at the 1977 World Championships, together with Otti Roethof and John Reeberg.

After retiring from competitions and until 2011 Kotzebue worked as a karate teacher in Amsterdam. In the mid-1990s, for two and half years he was the head coach of the Dutch karate team.
