= Karate at the 1981 World Games =

Karate competition

The karate events of World Games I were held on July 25–27, 1981, at the Toso Pavilion on the campus of Santa Clara University in California, United States. These were the first World Games, an international quadrennial multi-sport event, and were hosted by the city of city of Santa Clara. It was anticipated that Japanese athletes would perform well at karate. They did so by winning 12 medals among the nine events, including five gold medals.

== Medalists ==
Event	Gold	Silver	Bronze
Women
Kata	Susuko Okamura (JPN)	Mie Nakayama (JPN)	María Moreno (ESP)
Men
Kata	Keji Okada (JPN)	Masashi Koyama (JPN)	Domingo Llanos (USA)
Kumite 60kg	Masayuki Naito (JPN)	Fernando Roseuero (ESP)	Joe Tierney (GBR); Giuseppe Tinnirello (ITA)
Kumite 60-65kg	Yoshikazu Ono (JPN)	Toshiaki Maeda (JPN)	Robert De Luca (ITA); Kesayoshi Yokouchi (JPN)
Kumite 65-70kg	Cecil Hackett (GBR)	Bernard Bilicki (FRA)	Yukiyoshi Marutani (JPN); Seiji Nishimura (JPN)
Kumite 70-75kg	Lin Chi-min (TPE)	Fred Royers (NED)	Christian Gouze (FRA); Ángel López (ESP)
Kumite 75-80kg	Osamu Kamikodo (JPN)	Hisao Murase (JPN)	Tokey Hill (USA); Otti Roethof (NED)
Kumite +80kg	Ludwig Kotzebue (NED)	Chen Chien (TPE)	Claudio Guazzaroni (ITA); Francisco Torres (ESP)
Heavyweight	Vic Charles (GBR)	Marc Pyrée (FRA)	Billy Blanks (USA); Claude Petinella (FRA)

== Details ==
=== Women ===
==== Kata ====
Final – 1. Susuko Okamura, Japan, 65.4 points 2. Mie Nakayama, Japan, 65.3 3. Maria V. Moreno, Spain, 64.3.

=== Men ===
Considering that the losing athletes in both semifinals received bronze medals, it is unclear why there was a "bronze medal match" contested between them in each kumite classification.

==== Kata ====
Final – 1. K. Okada, Japan, 46.8 points 2. M. Kayama, Japan, 46.6 3. Domingo Llanos, USA, 46.2

==== Kumite 60kg ====
Eliminations – Pool A: M. Aikawa, Japan d. Tony Gunawan, Indonesia; G. D’Amico, Italy d. Giovanni Aguelo, Venezuela; Fernando Rosuero, Spain, bye; J. Tierney, England d. R. Situmeang, Indonesia.

Pool B: Jorge Castelli, Spain d. Gino McCulley, USA; M. Naito, Japan d. M. Gusti, Indonesia; Ivan Perez, Guatemala d. Rafael Franco, Dominican Republic; G. Tinniriello, Italy d. Chui Ching-Yen, Chinese Taipei

Final – Mayayuki Naito, Japan, d. Fernando Rosuero, Spain for gold medal; Joseph Tierney, Britain, d. Giuseppe Tinnirello, Italy, for bronze.

==== Kumite 60-65kg ====
Eliminations – Pool A: Tsai Ming-Shien, Chinese Taipei d. Cleveland Baxter, USA; Roberto DeLuca, Italy d. A. Pichardo, Dominican Republic; Z. Ono, Japan d. Ramon Malave, Sweden; Norbert Ayssi, France, bye

Pool B: Ricardo Abad, Spain d. Joseph Goffin, France; B.T. Maeda, Japan, bye; K. Yokouchi, Japan d. Ed DiNardo, USA; Eligio Martina, Curaçao d. Rustan Umbas, Indonesia

Final – Zenichi Ono, Japan, d. Toshiahi Maeda, Japan, for gold; Roberto De Luca, Italy, d. Kasayoshi Yokouchi, Japan, for bronze.

==== Kumite 65-70kg ====
Final – Cecil Hackett, Britain, d. Bernard Bilicky, France, for gold; Yukiyoshi Marutani, Japan, d. Seiji Nishimura, Japan, for bronze.

==== Kumite 70-75kg ====
Final – Lin Chin, Taiwan, d. Fred Royers, Netherlands, for gold; Angel Lopez, Spain, d. Christian Gouze, France, for bronze.

==== Kumite 75-80kg ====
Final – Osamu Kamikado, Japan d. Hisao Murase, Japan, for gold; Tokey Hill, USA d. John Roethoff, Netherlands, for bronze.

==== Kumite +80kg ====
Final – Ludwig Katzebue, Netherlands d. Chien Chen, Chinese Taipei, for gold; Claudio Guazzaroni, Italy d. Francisco Torres, Spain, for bronze.

==== Heavyweight ====
Final – Victor Charles, England d. Marc Pyree, France, for gold; Billy Banks, USA d. Claude Petinella, France, for bronze.
