= 1986 European Karate Championships =

Karate competition

- Location: Madrid, Spain
- Dates: 5–7 May
- Competitors: 300 from 20 nations

The 1986 European Karate Championships, the 21st edition, was held in Madrid, Spain from May 5 to 7, 1986.

== Medal table ==
* Host nation (Spain)

Rank	Nation	Gold	Silver	Bronze	Total
1	Italy	5	1	1	7
2	Spain*	4	6	6	16
3	France	2	4	5	11
4	England	2	0	3	5
5	Sweden	1	1	5	7
6	Netherlands	1	1	1	3
7	Yugoslavia	1	0	1	2
8	West Germany	0	1	3	4
9	Scotland	0	1	1	2
10	Norway	0	1	0	1
11	Finland	0	0	1	1
11	Switzerland	0	0	1	1
Totals (12 entries)		16	16	28	60

== Competition ==
Event	Gold	Silver	Bronze
Kata	(Italy) Dario Marchini	(Spain) Deogracias Medina	(Sweden) Conny Ferm
Kumite -60 kg	(Spain) Juan Ramon Gomez	(Italy) Daniele Simmi	(Sweden) Christian Keil (Spain) Tomas Tamargo
Kumite -65 kg	(Sweden) Ramon Malave	(Spain) Jesús Juan Rubio	(Spain) Ricardo Abad Cebolla (France) Didier Lupo
Kumite -70 kg	(England) William Thomas	(Scotland) Thomas Burns	(France) Norbert Gerards (Switzerland) Maurice Negro
Kumite -75 kg	(France) Serge Serfati	(Germany) Toni Dietl	(Spain) José Manuel Galan (Sweden) Thomas Hallman
Kumite -80 kg	(Spain) José Manuel Egea	(France) Jacques Tapol	(Scotland) Gerry Flemming (Finland) Tapio Pirttioja
Kumite + 80 kg	(Socialist Federal Republic of Yugoslavia) Samir Usenagic	(Sweden) Leslie Jensen	(Sweden) Karl Daggfeldt (Spain) Ricardo Sanchez
Open Kumite	(Spain) Jose Maria Torres	(Spain) Oscar Zazo	(France) Jacques Tapol (Sweden) Karl Daggfeldt

=== Team ===
Event	Gold	Silver	Bronze
Kata	Italy	Spain	Yugoslavia
Kumite	Spain	France	Italy; England

=== Women's competition ===
==== Individual ====
Event	Gold	Silver	Bronze
Kata	(Italy) Cristina Restelli	(Spain) María Moreno	(Germany) Birgit Schweiberer
Kumite -53 kg	(France) Sophie Berger	(France) Catherine Girardet	(Spain) Visitacion Garces (England) Shirley Graham
Kumite -60 kg	(England) Molly Samuels	(France) Catherine Morel	(France) Muriel Coquet (England) Tracy Phipps
Kumite +60 kg	(Netherlands) Guus van Mourik	(Netherlands) Henny van de Ploeg	(Spain) Manuela Garcia (France) Aude Girardet

==== Team ====
Event	Gold	Silver	Bronze
Kata	Italy	Spain	West Germany
Kumite	Italy	Norway	Netherlands; West Germany
