= 1982 European Karate Championships =

Karate competition

- Location: Gothenburg, Sweden
- Dates: May 5 to 7

The 1982 European Karate Championships, the 17th edition, was held in Gothenburg, Sweden from May 8 to 9, 1982. The women's competition in kumite of 1982 was not in Gotheburg, but London February 27 to 28 (with juniors).

== Competition ==
Event	Gold	Silver	Bronze
Kata	(France) Jean-Pierre Fischer	(Spain) Deogracias Medina	(Spain) Jorge Romero (Sweden) Malaga
Kumite -60 kg	(Switzerland) Juan Marquez	(United Kingdom) Stewart MacKinnon	(France) Mohammed Khatiri (France) Rudolphe Vallee
Kumite -65 kg	(Spain) Ricardo Abad Cebolla	(United Kingdom) Fiagan	(Sweden) Ramon Malave (United Kingdom) David Coulter
Kumite -70 kg	(Spain) Jose Damian Gonzalez Aguado	(Finland) Mika Manninen	(Spain) Rafael Arriaza Loureda (France) Thierry Masci
Kumite -75 kg	(Spain) Antonio Martínez Amillo	(France) Serge Serfati	(Sweden) Ronald Bengtsson (France) Didier Moreau
Kumite -80 kg	(France) Claude Pettinella	(Netherlands) Wim Mossel	(Switzerland) Erich Marti (Netherlands) Otti Roethof
Kumite + 80 kg	(United Kingdom) Jerome Atkinson	(Sweden) Hakan Nygren	(Spain) Francisco Torres (Italy) Claudio Guazzaroni
Open Kumite	(United Kingdom) Vic Charles	(United Kingdom) Livingston Whyte	(France) Patrice Ruggiero (Spain) Jose Manuel Torres

=== Team ===
Event	Gold	Silver	Bronze
Kata	Italy	France	Austria; Switzerland
Kumite	Netherlands	Italy	Spain; France

=== Women's competition ===
==== Individual ====
Event	Gold	Silver	Bronze
Kata	(Spain) María Moreno	(United Kingdom) Helen Raye	(Italy) Marina Sasso
Kumite -53 kg	(France) Francine Fillios	(Poland)	(Turkey) (Turkey)
Kumite -60 kg	(United Kingdom) Beverly Morris	(Russia)	(North Macedonia) (Czech Republic)
Kumite +60 kg	(France) Béatrice Joffroy	(Bosnia and Herzegovina)	(Turkey) (Switzerland)

==== Team ====
Event	Gold	Silver	Bronze
Kata	Sweden	France	Italy; Switzerland
