= 1984 World Karate Championships =

Karate competition

- Host city: Maastricht, Netherlands
- Dates: 18-21 October

The 1984 World Karate Championships are the 7th edition of the World Karate Championships. They were held in Maastricht, Netherlands from October 18 to October 21, 1984.

== Medalists ==
=== Men ===
Event	Gold	Silver	Bronze
Individual kata	Tsuguo Sakamoto; Japan	Masashi Koyama; Japan	Efthimios Karamitsos; West Germany
Kumite −60 kg	Dirk Betzien; West Germany	Nicola Simmi; Italy	Isno Alberto; Netherlands
Kumite −60 kg	Dirk Betzien; West Germany	Nicola Simmi; Italy	Shinichi Hasegawa; Japan
Kumite −65 kg	Ramon Malavé; Sweden	Ignacio Lugo; Mexico	Roel van Loon; Netherlands
Kumite −65 kg	Ramon Malavé; Sweden	Ignacio Lugo; Mexico	Marc Van Reybrouck; Belgium
Kumite −70 kg	Jim Collins; Great Britain	Gonzalo Rodríguez; Spain	Cecil Hackett; Great Britain
Kumite −70 kg	Jim Collins; Great Britain	Gonzalo Rodríguez; Spain	Felipe Hita; Spain
Kumite −75 kg	Toon Stelling; Netherlands	Javier Gomez; Switzerland	Yorihisa Uchida; Japan
Kumite −75 kg	Toon Stelling; Netherlands	Javier Gomez; Switzerland	Serge Serfati; France
Kumite −80 kg	Pat McKay; Great Britain	Otti Roethof; Netherlands	Dudley Josepa; Netherlands
Kumite −80 kg	Pat McKay; Great Britain	Otti Roethof; Netherlands	Pino Sacchi; Italy
Kumite +80 kg	Jerome Atkinson; Great Britain	Claudio Guazzaroni; Italy	Marc Pyrée; France
Kumite +80 kg	Jerome Atkinson; Great Britain	Claudio Guazzaroni; Italy	Massimo Di Luigi; Italy
Kumite open	Emmanuel Pinda; France	Patrice Ruggiero; France	Vic Charles; Great Britain
Kumite open	Emmanuel Pinda; France	Patrice Ruggiero; France	Jyri Kauria; Finland
Team kumite	Great Britain	Sweden	France
Team kumite	Great Britain	Sweden	Spain

=== Women ===
Event	Gold	Silver	Bronze
Individual kata	Mie Nakayama; Japan	Setsuko Takagi; Japan	Chu Mei-yuen; Chinese Taipei
Kumite −53 kg	Sophie Berger; France	Anita Myhren; Norway	Kim Friedl; United States
Kumite −53 kg	Sophie Berger; France	Anita Myhren; Norway	Catherine Girardet; France
Kumite −60 kg	Tomoko Konishi; Japan	Wang Kuei-yuan; Chinese Taipei	Beverly Morris; Great Britain
Kumite −60 kg	Tomoko Konishi; Japan	Wang Kuei-yuan; Chinese Taipei	Sari Nybäck; Finland
Kumite +60 kg	Guusje van Mourik; Netherlands	Yvette Bryan; Great Britain	Kari Lunde; Norway
Kumite +60 kg	Guusje van Mourik; Netherlands	Yvette Bryan; Great Britain	Stine Nygård; Norway

== Medal table ==
Rank	Nation	Gold	Silver	Bronze	Total
1	Great Britain	4	1	3	8
2	Japan	3	2	2	7
3	France	2	1	4	7
4	Netherlands	2	1	3	6
5	Sweden	1	1	0	2
6	West Germany	1	0	1	2
7	Italy	0	2	2	4
8	Norway	0	1	2	3
8	Spain	0	1	2	3
10	Chinese Taipei	0	1	1	2
11	Mexico	0	1	0	1
11	Switzerland	0	1	0	1
13	Finland	0	0	2	2
14	Belgium	0	0	1	1
14	United States	0	0	1	1
Totals (15 entries)		13	13	24	50
