= 1979 European Karate Championships =

Karate competition

- Location: Helsinki, Finland
- Dates: May 2 to 4

The 1979 European Karate Championships, the 14th edition, was held in Helsinki, Finland from May 4 to 6, 1979.

== Competition ==
Event	Gold	Silver	Bronze
Kumite -65 kg	(Italy) Roberto De Luca	(Spain) Felipe Hita	(Finland) Jukka Lindström (Netherlands) Rob Walraven
Kumite -70 kg	(Spain) Damian Gonzalez	(Spain) Jose Arsenal	(France) Bernard Bilicki (Sweden) Ronald Bengtsson
Kumite -75 kg	(Netherlands) Fred Royers	(England) Gary coppen	(France) Patrice Gauze (Italy) Franco Paganini
Kumite -80 kg	(Netherlands) Otti Roethof	(France) Claude Pettinella	(England) Ewart Campbell (England) Tyron White
Kumite + 80 kg	(Netherlands) John Reeberg	(Italy) Massimo Di Luigi	(France) Patrice Ruggiero (England) Eugene Codrington
Open Kumite	(Spain) Jean-Pierre Carbila	(France) Jean-Luc Montama	(England) Victor Charles (England) Godfrey Butler

=== Team ===
Event	Gold	Silver	Bronze
Kumite	Netherlands	France	Finland; Italy
