= Paturel =

Paturel is a surname. Notable people with the surname include:

- Benoît Paturel (born 1994), French Motocross racer
- Dominique Paturel (1931–2022), French stage, film, and voice actor
- Robert Paturel (born 1952), French boxer
- Sabine Paturel (born 1965), French singer and actress
