= Paul Alderson =

British karateka

Paul Alderson (born 27 July 1970 in Ilford, London, United Kingdom) practised Karate between the years 1977 and 1997. He is a winner of multiple National, European and World Karate Championships.

He was the first UK Karateka to win three European Junior titles back to back (1989,1990,1991) and in 1996 he won the open weight division at the World Karate Championships in Sun City, South Africa. On retiring from Karate in 1997, holding the WKF World Open title, he started a sports promotions agency, Fighters Inc Ltd with his long term business partner Joe Long and that year they produced their first event, 3on3 Karate. In 1999, he created SENI (or SE-NI Japanese translation to mean fighting spirit) the martial arts trade exhibition held at the National Exhibition Centre in Birmingham.
