= Tokey Hill =

American martial artist

- Born: Terrance Alan Hill; 1957; Chillicothe, Ohio, United States
- Style: Shotokan Karate

Other information
- Website: tokeyhill.com

Terrance Alan "Tokey" Hill is an American karateka most well known for being the first male American to ever win a WUKO/WKF World Karate Championship which he achieved at the 1980 World Karate Championships in the 80 kg Kumite category. He also won a bronze medal in Kumite at the World Games 1981 He would open up his own school in 1983. He has also been a kickboxing coach for Michael McDonald and later a karate coach for the USA National Karate-do Federation Coach Hill traveled to Argentina as the Assistant Coach for the 1995 USA Karate Team during the debut of Karate at the Pan American Games.

Hill appeared in one film, the 1991 martial arts film American Shaolin. He appears in the film's opening as the coach of the film's villain, Trevor Gottitall, played by Trent Bushey.

== Achievements ==
- First American to win a WKF World Karate Championship
- Six times AAU/United States National Karate Championships
- World Games 1981 bronze medal
