= Francisco Merino =

Spanish Karate Champion

- Born: Spain
- Nationality: Spanish
- Height: 187 cm (6 ft 2 in)
- Division: Under 75Kg
- Style: Shito-Ryu
- Rank: Black Belt 4ºDAN
- Years active: 1982 – 1990

Francisco Merino Molina is a noted Spanish practitioner of karate. At the 18th edition of the European Karate Championships in 1983, held in Madrid, he received the gold medal in men's kumite in the under-75 kg category

In 1984 he participated in the seventh edition of the Karate World Championship, where he won a bronze medal (for teams) together with José Pérez, Felipe Hita, Oscar Zazo, José Manuel Egea, José María Torres and Antonio M. Amillo.

Today he continues to devote himself to karate, giving classes and preparing competitors as a master of the Shito-Ryu style.

== Competition record ==
Year	Titles
1981	First place in the Championship of Spain (Junior Individual)
1982	Champion of Europe (Junior Spanish Team), Sub-Champion of Europe (Junior individual), Sub- Champion of Spain (Senior Individual)
1983	Champion of Europe (Individual Senior), Champion of Europe (Junior Spanish Team)
1984	Third place in the World Championship (Team Spain), Sub- Champion of Europe (Junior Spanish Team), First place in the Spanish clubs championship
1985	First place in the Spanish clubs championship
1986	Third place in the championship of Spain, First place in the Spanish clubs championship
1987	First place in the Spanish clubs championship
1988	First place in the European clubs championship, First place in the Spanish clubs championship
1990	Third place in the European clubs championship
