= Domingo Llanos =

Dominican-born American karateka

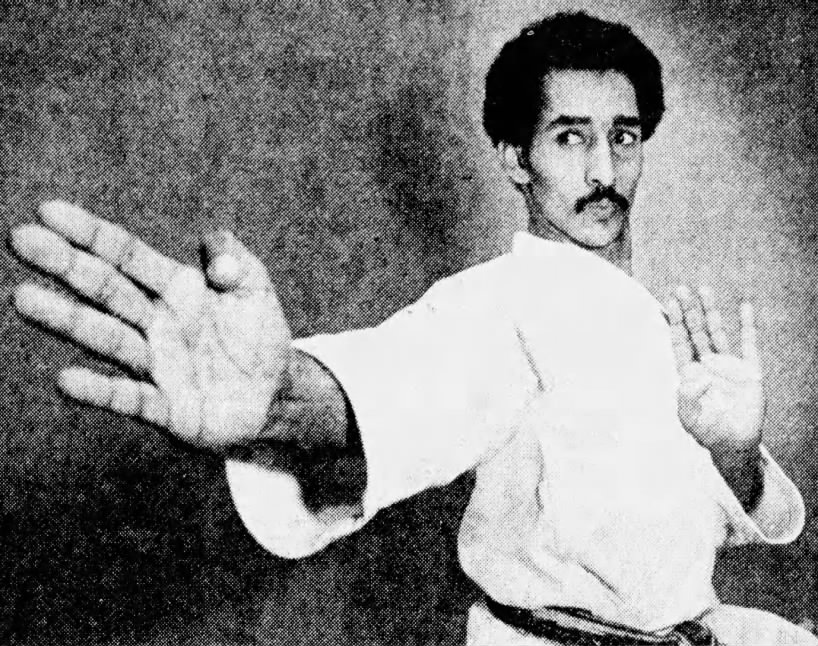
- Llanos in 1982

Personal information
- Born: 1956 or 1957 (age 68–69) Dominican Republic

Sport
- Country: United States
- Sport: Karate
Medal record
Representing United States
Karate
World Games
Bronze medal – third place	1981 Santa Clara	Men’s kata
World Championships
Silver medal – second place	1982 Taipei	Men’s individual kata

Domingo Llanos (born 1956/1957) is a Dominican-born American karateka.

== Life and career ==
Llanos was born in the Dominican Republic. He was a child-care worker.

Llanos competed at the 1981 World Games, winning the bronze medal in the men's kata event in karate. He also competed at the 1982 World Karate Championships, winning the silver medal in the men's individual kata event.

Llanos was a member of the Atlantic World Karate Team.
