= Vic Charles =

British karateka

- Born: Victor John Charles; Saint Lucia
- Style: Wado-ryu Karate

Victor John-Charles (born Saint Lucia) is a British karateka. He has an 8th Dan black belt in karate and is the winner of multiple individual and team medals at the World Championship, World Games and European Karate Championships. Vic Charles came 3rd in 1983 television competition Superstars. Vic Charles was awarded an MBE for Services to karate in the Queen's Birthday Honours List in 1989. This was the first time the sport of karate had been acknowledged in such a fashion. On retiring from competitive karate in 1990 Vic continued as chief instructor of British Sport Karate Association (B.S.K.A.) the Association he established in 1985. The Association dominated English karate competitions and won 2 European Club Team titles. The association counted 3 World and European Champions as members Mervyn Etienne, Mike Sailsman, and Willie Thomas. Vic was appointed English national coach in 1996 and became technical manager of the Performance Plan in 1997 until 1999. He was a member of the board of Karate England until 1999.

== Achievements ==
- 1977 European Karate Championships Team Gold Medal
- 1978 European Karate Championships Kumite Silver Openweight
- 1979 European Club Champion Team Gold Medal
- 1979 European Karate Championships Kumite Bronze Openweight
- 1980 World Karate Championships Team kumite Bronze Medal
- 1981 World GamesKumite Gold Medal
- 1981 European Karate Championships Kumite Gold Medal
- 1982 European Karate Championships Kumite Gold Medal
- 1984 European Karate Championships Kumite Gold Medal
- 1984 European Karate Championships Team Bronze Medal
- 1984 World Karate Championships Kumite Bronze Medal
- 1984 World Karate Championships Team Gold
- 1985 European Karate Championships Team Gold Medal
- 1985 World Games Kumite Gold Medal
- 1986 World Karate Championships Kumite Gold Medal
- 1986 European Karate Championships Team Bronze Medal
- 1987 European Karate Championships Team Bronze Medal
- 1988 World Karate Championships Ippon Kumite Silver Medal
- 1988 World Karate Championships Kumite Silver Medal
- 1988 World Karate Championships Team Gold Medal
- 1988 European Karate Championships Team Bronze Medal
- 1989 European Karate Championships Kumite Silver Medal

COACHING ACHIEVEMENTS

- 1997 Senior Europeans 1 Gold, 3 Bronze
- 1997 Junior Europeans 1 Gold, 1 Silver, 3 Bronze
- 1997 World Games 3 Gold, 1 Silver, 2 Bronze
- 1997 World Cup 3 Gold
- 1997 British Championships 24 Gold, 25 Silver, 37 Bronze
- 1997 Venice Cup 4 Gold, 4 Silver, 7 Bronze
- 1998 Women's Cup 1 Silver, 1 Team Bronze
- 1998 Junior Europeans 3 Silver, 3 Bronze
- 1998 World Championship 1 Gold, 2 Team Silver, 2 Bronze
- 1998 Senior Europeans 1 Team Gold, 2 Silver, 2 Bronze
- 1998 Paris Open 2 Silver
- 1998 Venice Cup 2 Gold, 4 Silver, 6 Bronze
- 1998 Dutch Open 5 Gold, 2 Silver, 2 Bronze
- 1999 Senior Europeans 1 Gold
- 1999 Junior Europeans 2 Gold, 2 Bronze
- 1999 Paris Open 2 Silver, 2 Bronze
- 1999 Ville de Madrid 1 Team Bronze

British and English Titles

- 1974 British Junior Championships Gold Heavyweight Medal
- 1978 English Championships Gold Heavyweight Medal
- 1978 English Championships Gold Openweight Medal
- 1979 English Championships Gold Heavyweight Medal
- 1980 English Championships Gold Heavyweight Medal
- 1984 English Championships Gold Heavyweight Medal
- 1985 English Championships Gold Heavyweight Medal
- 1986 English Championships Gold Heavyweight Medal
- 1987 English Championships Gold Team Medal
- 1987 British Championships Gold Team Medal
- 1987 British Club Championships Gold Team Medal
- 1988 English Championships Gold Team Medal
- 1989 English Championships Gold Team Medal

International and Association Titles

- 1977 Czechoslovakia Heavyweight Gold Medal
- 1977 Czechoslovakia Team Gold Medal
- 1978 Dutch Open Heavyweight Gold Medal
- 1978 Dutch Open Openweight Bronze Medal
- 1979 Spanish Open Gold medal
- 1980 Czechoslovakia Team Gold Medal
- 1980 Inter City European Team Gold Medal
- 1982 Superstars Champion Welsh Heats
- 1983 Supertars Runner Up Bath
- 1983 Superstars Runner Up
- 1983 Superstars British Championships Third Place
- 1983 Superstars Swimming Record Holder
- 1985 Paris Champion of Champions Silver Heavyweight Medal
- 1985 Paris Champion of Champions Silver Openweight Medal
- 1985 Commonwealth Championships Gold Openweight Medal
- 1985 Commonwealth Championships Team Gold Medal
- 1986 Commonwealth Sports Award
