= Efthimios =

Efthimios and Efthymios are given names. People with the given names include:

== Efthimios ==
- Efthimios Rentzias
- Efthimios Kaxiras
- Efthimios Diplaros
- Efthimios Karamitsos
- Efthimios Papadopoulos
- Efthimios Mitas
- Gregory Efthimios Louganis

== Efthymios ==
- Efthymios Christodoulou
- Efthymios Kalaras
- Efthymios Mitropoulos
- Efthymios Tsimikalis
- Efthymios Tsakaleris
- Efthymios Kaoudis
