= Kenneth Leeuwin =

Dutch karateka

Personal information
- Born: 19 October 1961 (age 64) Paramaribo, Suriname

Sport
- Sport: Karate
Medal record
Representing the Netherlands
World Championships
Gold medal – first place	1986	Kumite −75 kg
European Championships
Gold medal – first place	1984	Kumite −75 kg
Bronze medal – third place	1985	Kumite 75 kg
Silver medal – second place	1988	Kumite 75 kg

Kenneth Leeuwin (born 19 October 1961) is a retired Dutch-Surinamese karateka. He was a European champion in middleweight categories in 1984 and 1979 and won a gold medal at the 1986 World Championships.

== Personal life ==
Dutch politician Sylvana Simons is Kenneth Leeuwin's half sister.
