= 1986 World Karate Championships =

Karate competitions

- Host city: Sydney, Australia
- Dates: 03-06 October

The 1986 WUKO World Karate Championships are the 8th edition of the World Karate Championships, and were held in Sydney, Australia from October 3 to October 6, 1986.

== Medalists ==
=== Men ===
Event	Gold	Silver	Bronze
Individual kata	Tsuguo Sakamoto; Japan	Tomoyuki Aihara; Japan	Dario Marchini; Italy
Team kata	Japan	France	Yugoslavia
Kumite −60 kg	Hideto Nakano; Japan	Yoichi Uchi; Japan	Stewart MacKinnon; Great Britain
Kumite −60 kg	Hideto Nakano; Japan	Yoichi Uchi; Japan	Rudolphe Vallée; France
Kumite −65 kg	Eizu Kondo; Japan	Yuichi Suzuki; Japan	Erik Piispa; Finland
Kumite −65 kg	Eizu Kondo; Japan	Yuichi Suzuki; Japan	Marc Van Reybrouck; Belgium
Kumite −70 kg	Thierry Masci; France	Ko Hayashi; Japan	Manuel Monzon; Canada
Kumite −70 kg	Thierry Masci; France	Ko Hayashi; Japan	Maurice Negro; Switzerland
Kumite −75 kg	Kenneth Leeuwin; Netherlands	José Carlos de Oliveira; Brazil	Tom Lilovac; Australia
Kumite −75 kg	Kenneth Leeuwin; Netherlands	José Carlos de Oliveira; Brazil	Ian Napier; Australia
Kumite −80 kg	Jacques Tapol; France	Pat McKay; Great Britain	José Manuel Egea; Spain
Kumite −80 kg	Jacques Tapol; France	Pat McKay; Great Britain	Gianluca Guazzaroni; Italy
Kumite +80 kg	Vic Charles; Great Britain	Geoff Thompson; Great Britain	Waldemar Rauch; West Germany
Kumite +80 kg	Vic Charles; Great Britain	Geoff Thompson; Great Britain	Frank Bura; Denmark
Kumite open	Karl Daggfeldt; Sweden	Claudio Guazzaroni; Italy	Dudley Josepa; Netherlands
Kumite open	Karl Daggfeldt; Sweden	Claudio Guazzaroni; Italy	José Manuel Egea; Spain
Team kumite	Great Britain	France	Sweden
Team kumite	Great Britain	France	Italy

=== Women ===
Event	Gold	Silver	Bronze
Individual kata	Mie Nakayama; Japan	Miki Hashimoto; Japan	Claire Curtis; Australia
Team kata	Chinese Taipei	Japan	United States
Kumite −53 kg	Sari Kauria; Finland	Yumi Yanagisawa; Japan	Yuko Hasama; Japan
Kumite −53 kg	Sari Kauria; Finland	Yumi Yanagisawa; Japan	Sari Laine; Finland
Kumite −60 kg	Ritva Varelius; Finland	Molly Samuel; Great Britain	Solveig Hansen; Norway
Kumite −60 kg	Ritva Varelius; Finland	Molly Samuel; Great Britain	Christine Ferguson; Australia
Kumite +60 kg	Guusje van Mourik; Netherlands	Kari Lunde; Norway	Keiko Kawano; Japan
Kumite +60 kg	Guusje van Mourik; Netherlands	Kari Lunde; Norway	Yvette Bryan; Great Britain

== Medal table ==
Rank	Nation	Gold	Silver	Bronze	Total
1	Japan	5	7	2	14
2	Great Britain	2	3	2	7
3	France	2	2	1	5
4	Finland	2	0	2	4
5	Netherlands	2	0	1	3
6	Sweden	1	0	1	2
7	Chinese Taipei	1	0	0	1
8	Italy	0	1	3	4
9	Norway	0	1	1	2
10	Brazil	0	1	0	1
11	Australia	0	0	4	4
12	Spain	0	0	2	2
13	Belgium	0	0	1	1
13	Canada	0	0	1	1
13	Denmark	0	0	1	1
13	Switzerland	0	0	1	1
13	United States	0	0	1	1
13	West Germany	0	0	1	1
13	Yugoslavia	0	0	1	1
Totals (19 entries)		15	15	26	56
