= Geoff Thompson (karateka) =

English karateka

Geoff Thompson MBE DL FRSA
- Style: Wado-ryu Karate

Other information
- Website: Official site

Geoff Thompson is a British karate fighter. He is the winner of multiple European Karate Championships and World Karate Championships medals. Thompson was appointed Member of the Order of the British Empire (MBE) in the 1995 New Year Honours for services to sport, particularly karate. He is the founder and executive chair of the Youth Charter, a charity established in 1993.

Thompson has also been appointed a Deputy Lieutenant of Greater Manchester and a Fellow of the Royal Society of Arts.

== Achievements ==
- 1982 World Karate Championships Gold Medal
- 1983 European Karate Championships Silver Medal
- 1985 World Games Kumite Gold Medal
- 1986 World Karate Championships Silver Medal

== Video game ==
In 1985, Thompson was signed to promote the game The Way of the Exploding Fist.
