= NKF =

NKF may refer to:

Computing

- Network Kanji Filter (NKF Japanese Encoder)

Organizations

- National Kidney Foundation
- National Kidney Foundation Singapore
- Norwegian Association for Women's Rights
- USA National Karate-do Federation

Companies

- NKF, former Netherlands Cable Works, now Prysmian in Delft.
