= Leon Walters =

British karateka (born 1979)

- Born: Leon Anthony Walters; 9 January 1979 (age 47); Peckham, England, UK
- Style: Karate

Leon Walters (born 9 January 1979 in London) is a British karateka. He is the winner of multiple European Karate Championships and World Karate Championships Karate medals.

== Achievements ==
- 1997 World Games Kumite Gold Medal
- 1998 World Karate Championships Kumite Bronze Medal
- 2001 European Karate Championships Silver Medal
- 2002 European Karate Championships Kumite Silver Medal
- 2002 World Karate Championships Kumite Gold Medal
- 2004 World Karate Championships Silver Medal
