= Fred Royers =

Dutch kickboxer (born 1955)

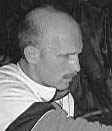
- Royers in 1987
- Born: March 15, 1955 (age 71); Arnhem, Netherlands
- Other names: Le Gladiateur
- Height: 1.73 m (5 ft 8 in)
- Weight: 72.5 kg (160 lb; 11 st 6 lb)
- Division: Middleweight; Super Middleweight
- Style: Karate, Kickboxing, Savate
- Fighting out of: Amsterdam, Netherlands
- Team: Mejiro Gym; Kickboxing Arnhem
- Trainer: Jan Plas
- Years active: 1978–1986

Kickboxing record
- Total: 43
- Wins: 39
- By knockout: 14
- Losses: 4
- Draws: 0

Fred Royers (born March 15, 1955) is a Dutch former kickboxer who competed in the middleweight division. He was known for his powerful low kicks, which is now a staple of Dutch kickboxing.

== Biography and career ==
Royers began practicing karate at the age of 16. He went on to become the Dutch national champion on nine occasions and also won medals at the Karate World Championships in 1979, 1980, 1982 and 1984 as well as the World Games 1981. He also competed in amateur boxing.

In 1978, Royers joined the Mejiro Gym and took up kickboxing. He became the European Savate Champion in 1984 when he defeated Robert Paturel via technical knockout in Paris, France. The following year, he won the WKA Middleweight Championship of the World when he won a 12-round decision victory over Yasuo Tabata. He was forced to retire in 1986, however, after breaking his arm twice in training.

Following his retirement, Royers opened his own gym in his home town of Arnhem and began working as the Dutch language kickboxing commentator for Eurosport in 1990.

== Titles ==
- Amateur boxing
  - Oost district champion
- Karate
  - 5x Middleweight Champion of the Netherlands
  - 4x Openweight Champion of the Netherlands
  - 1979 European Championship Champion
  - 1980 World Championships: Bronze Medal
  - 1981 World Games: Silver Medal
  - 1982 World Championships: Bronze Medal
  - 1984 European Championships: Bronze Medal
- Kickboxing
  - Middleweight Muay Thai Champion of the Netherlands
  - Middleweight Kickboxing Champion of the Netherlands
  - European Savate Champion
  - WKA European Middleweight Champion
  - WKA Middleweight Champion of the World
  - WKL Hall of Fame WKL

== Kickboxing record ==
Kickboxing record
20 wins (6 KO's), 1 loss
Date	Result	Opponent	Event	Location	Method	Round	Time	Notes
December 5, 1985	Loss	(France) Youssef Zenaf		Paris, France	Decision	9	3:00	For IKL and WAKO Super Middleweight World titles.
October 20, 1985	Win	(Japan) Yasuo Tabata		Amsterdam, Netherlands	Decision	12	3:00	Wins WKA Middleweight World title.
August 30, 1985	Win	(West Germany) Ralf Berger		West Berlin, West Germany	TKO (low kick)	6		Defends WKA Middleweight European title.
May 12, 1985	Win	(England) Keith Nathan		Amsterdam, Netherlands	TKO (low kick)	4		Defends WKA Middleweight European title.
April 22, 1985	Win	(France) Pascal LePlat		Paris, France	Decision	9	3:00	Wins WKA Middleweight European title.
March 25, 1985	Win	(France) Robert Paturel		Paris, France	Decision	5	3:00	
February 3, 1985	Win	(United States) Ernie Jackson		Amsterdam, Netherlands	Decision (split)	9	3:00	
April 28, 1984	Win	(France) Christian Bafir		Paris, France	Decision	5	3:00	
March 29, 1984	Win	(United States) Larry Nichols		Hollywood, Florida, USA	Decision	9	3:00	
September 23, 1983	Win	(Canada) Billy Chau		Amsterdam, Netherlands	Decision	9	3:00	
June 18, 1983	Win	(France) Gaetan Litricin		Amsterdam, Netherlands	TKO (forfeit)	1	0:00	
June 10, 1983	Win	(France) Youssef Zenaf	Nuit de la Boxe Americaine	Paris, France	Decision	7	3:00	Wins BFS Middleweight European title.
March 13, 1983	Win	(Italy) L. Minocci		Amsterdam, Netherlands	TKO (forfeit)	1	0:00	
February 28, 1983	Win	(England) Robert Davis		Amsterdam, Netherlands	KO	1		Wins NKBB Super Middleweight Dutch title.
June 19, 1982	Win	(France) Robert Paturel		Paris, France	TKO (kick)	4		Wins BFS Super Middleweight European title.
April 4, 1982	Win	(France) Christian Bafir		Amsterdam, Netherlands	Decision	5	3:00	
March 14, 1982	Win	(Netherlands) Hans de Ruiter		Paris, France	TKO	2		
November 23, 1981	Win	(Netherlands) Henk Kooy		Amsterdam, Netherlands	Decision	5	5:00	
September 20, 1981	Win	(Netherlands) Niek Bloemberg		Amsterdam, Netherlands	KO	2		
June 21, 1981	Win	(France) Sarge Solignac		Paris, France	Decision	5	3:00	
May 15, 1981	Win	(France) Pascal Leplat		Paris, France	Decision	5	3:00	
March 9, 1981	Win	(England) Alan Dixon		Amsterdam, Netherlands	Decision	3	3:00	
January 18, 1981	Win	(Turkey) Tuncay Coban		Amsterdam, Netherlands	Decision	3	3:00	
Legend: Win Loss Draw/No contest
