= Molly Samuel-Leport =

British karateka (born 1961)

Molly Samuel MBE
- Born: Molly Irene Samuel; 12 September 1961 (age 65); London, England
- Style: Isshin-ryū karate
- Rank: 6th Dan

Molly Irene Samuel-Leport MBE (born 12 September 1961) is a British karateka, community leader and political candidate. She has a 6th Dan black belt in karate and is the winner of multiple European Karate Championships. Samuel-Leport received the 1989 Sunday Times International Sports Woman of the Year and 1987 Jamaican Jubilee Award for Excellence.

She was appointed Member of the Order of the British Empire (MBE) in the 2015 New Year Honours for services to karate.

== Achievements ==
- 1986 European Karate Championships Kumite Gold Medal
- 1986 World Karate Championships Kumite Silver Medal
- 1987 European Karate Championships Kumite Gold Medal
- 1989 European Karate Championships Kumite Gold Medal
- 1990 World Karate Championships Kumite Bronze Medal
- 1991 European Karate Championships Kumite Gold Medal
- 1992 European Karate Championships Kumite Gold Medal
- 1992 World Karate Championships Kumite Gold Medal
- 1993 World Games Gold Medal

== Politics ==
Samuel-Leport was the Conservative PPC for Walthamstow in the 2015 general election. She polled 5,584 votes, which was 13.4% of the overall vote. This was the first time the Conservatives had finished in second place in the constituency since 2001.

At the 2017 general election, she was selected again to contest the seat where she finished in second again, increasing her vote share to 14.1%.

She stood as the Conservative Party candidate for Brent and Harrow for the 2021 London Assembly election, coming second, and as a Conservative Party candidate for Upper Walthamstow ward in the 2022 Waltham Forest London Borough Council election, coming fourth in the two-member ward.
