= 1982 World Karate Championships =

World Karate competition

- Host city: Taipei, Taiwan
- Dates: 21–25 November

The 1982 World Karate Championships are the 6th edition of the World Karate Championships, and were held in Taipei, Taiwan from November 21 to 25 November 1982.

== Medalists ==
=== Men ===
Event	Gold	Silver	Bronze
Individual kata	Masashi Koyama; Japan	Domingo Llanos; United States	Maurizio Marangoni; Italy
Individual kata	Masashi Koyama; Japan	Domingo Llanos; United States	Tetsuo Tabata; Japan
Kumite −60 kg	Jukka-Pekka Väyrynen; Finland	Rudolphe Vallée; France	Ramón Castillo; Venezuela
Kumite −60 kg	Jukka-Pekka Väyrynen; Finland	Rudolphe Vallée; France	Stewart MacKinnon; Great Britain
Kumite −65 kg	Yuichi Suzuki; Japan	Giorgio Carcangiu; Italy	Toshiaki Maeda; Japan
Kumite −65 kg	Yuichi Suzuki; Japan	Giorgio Carcangiu; Italy	Roberto Sanz; Spain
Kumite −70 kg	Seiji Nishimura; Japan	Mika Manninen; Finland	Raffaele Bernardi; Italy
Kumite −70 kg	Seiji Nishimura; Japan	Mika Manninen; Finland	Thierry Masci; France
Kumite −75 kg	Javier Gomez; Switzerland	Alfie Borg; Great Britain	Lin Chi-min; Chinese Taipei
Kumite −75 kg	Javier Gomez; Switzerland	Alfie Borg; Great Britain	Fred Royers; Netherlands
Kumite −80 kg	Pat McKay; Great Britain	Tapio Pirttioja; Finland	Jan Holm; Denmark
Kumite −80 kg	Pat McKay; Great Britain	Tapio Pirttioja; Finland	Jacques Tapol; France
Kumite +80 kg	Geoff Thompson; Great Britain	Patrice Ruggiero; France	Mario Garofoli; Luxembourg
Kumite +80 kg	Geoff Thompson; Great Britain	Patrice Ruggiero; France	John Reeberg; Netherlands
Kumite open	Hisao Murase; Japan	Antonio Martínez; Spain	Jerome Atkinson; Great Britain
Kumite open	Hisao Murase; Japan	Antonio Martínez; Spain	Pierre Pinard; France
Team kumite	Great Britain	Italy	Spain
Team kumite	Great Britain	Italy	Japan

=== Women ===
Event	Gold	Silver	Bronze
Individual kata	Mie Nakayama; Japan	Chu Mei-yuen; Chinese Taipei	Minako Tabata; Japan
Individual kata	Mie Nakayama; Japan	Chu Mei-yuen; Chinese Taipei	Alexandra Starling; Australia
Kumite −53 kg	Sophie Berger; France	Yao Li; Chinese Taipei	Francine Fillios; France
Kumite −53 kg	Sophie Berger; France	Yao Li; Chinese Taipei	Chiang S. Chinese Taipei
Kumite −60 kg	Yukari Yamakawa; Japan	Tomoko Konishi; Japan	Chang W. Chinese Taipei
Kumite −60 kg	Yukari Yamakawa; Japan	Tomoko Konishi; Japan	Beverly Morris; Great Britain
Kumite +60 kg	Guusje van Mourik; Netherlands	T. Yamafuku; Japan	Janice Argyle; Great Britain
Kumite +60 kg	Guusje van Mourik; Netherlands	T. Yamafuku; Japan	Nadia Ferluga; Italy

== Medal table ==
Rank	Nation	Gold	Silver	Bronze	Total
1	Japan	6	2	4	12
2	Great Britain	3	1	4	8
3	France	1	2	4	7
4	Finland	1	2	0	3
5	Netherlands	1	0	2	3
6	Switzerland	1	0	0	1
7	Chinese Taipei	0	2	3	5
7	Italy	0	2	3	5
9	Spain	0	1	2	3
10	United States	0	1	0	1
11	Australia	0	0	1	1
11	Denmark	0	0	1	1
11	Luxembourg	0	0	1	1
11	Venezuela	0	0	1	1
Totals (14 entries)		13	13	26	52

== See also ==
- List of sporting events in Taiwan
