= Janice Argyle =

English kareteka

- Style: Karate

Janice Argyle is an English karateka. She is the winner of multiple European Karate Championships and World Karate Championships Karate medals.
