= 2000 World Karate Championships =

Karate competition

- Host city: Munich, Germany
- Dates: 12–15 October
- Main venue: Olympiahalle

The 2000 World Karate Championships are the 15th edition of the World Karate Championships, and were held in Munich, Germany from October 12 to October 15, 2000.

== Medalists ==
=== Men ===
Event	Gold	Silver	Bronze
Individual kata	Michaël Milon; France	Ryoki Abe; Japan	Luca Valdesi; Italy
Team kata	Japan	France; Yves Bardreau; Stéphane Mari; Laurent Riccio	Spain; Javier Hernández; David Toro; Fernando San José
Kumite −60 kg	Cécil Boulesnane; France	Francesco Ortu; Italy	Damien Dovy; Benin
Kumite −60 kg	Cécil Boulesnane; France	Francesco Ortu; Italy	Kenichi Imai; Japan
Kumite −65 kg	Lazar Boskovic; Germany	Ángel Ramiro; Spain	Alexandre Biamonti; France
Kumite −65 kg	Lazar Boskovic; Germany	Ángel Ramiro; Spain	George Kotaka; United States
Kumite −70 kg	Junior Lefevre; Croatia	Fodé Ndao; Senegal	Mehdi Amouzadeh; Iran
Kumite −70 kg	Junior Lefevre; Croatia	Fodé Ndao; Senegal	Rida Bel-Lahsen; France
Kumite −75 kg	Iván Leal; Spain	Fadi Chaabo; Germany	David Félix; France
Kumite −75 kg	Iván Leal; Spain	Fadi Chaabo; Germany	Gennaro Talarico; Italy
Kumite −80 kg	Daniël Sabanovic; Netherlands	Yann Baillon; France	Thomas Nitschmann; Germany
Kumite −80 kg	Daniël Sabanovic; Netherlands	Yann Baillon; France	Alejandro Arnáiz; Spain
Kumite +80 kg	Mamadou Ndiaye; Senegal	Seydina Baldé; France	Mehran Behnamfar; Iran
Kumite +80 kg	Mamadou Ndiaye; Senegal	Seydina Baldé; France	Marc Haubold; Germany
Kumite open	Christophe Pinna; France	Davide Benetello; Italy	Saeid Ashtian; Iran
Kumite open	Christophe Pinna; France	Davide Benetello; Italy	Konstantinos Papadopoulos; Greece
Team kumite	France; Yann Baillon; Seydina Baldé; Olivier Beaudry; Rida Bel-Lahsen; Alexandre Biamonti; Cécil Boulesnane; David Félix; Robert Gomis	Germany; Samad Azadi; Fadi Chaabo; Mark Haubold; Andreas Horn; Thomas Nitschmann; Emanuel Racanel; Senol Yildirim	England
Team kumite	France; Yann Baillon; Seydina Baldé; Olivier Beaudry; Rida Bel-Lahsen; Alexandre Biamonti; Cécil Boulesnane; David Félix; Robert Gomis	Germany; Samad Azadi; Fadi Chaabo; Mark Haubold; Andreas Horn; Thomas Nitschmann; Emanuel Racanel; Senol Yildirim	Spain; Alejandro Arnáiz; Serafín Blanco; Tomás Herrero; Iván Leal; Óscar Olivares; David Ortega; Óscar Vázquez

=== Women ===
Event	Gold	Silver	Bronze
Individual kata	Atsuko Wakai; Japan	Myriam Szkudlarek; France	Roberta Sodero; Italy
Team kata	France; Jessica Buil; Sabrina Buil; Myriam Szkudlarek	Japan	Italy
Kumite −53 kg	Hiromi Hasama; Japan	Nadia Mecheri; France	Gladys Eusebio; Peru
Kumite −53 kg	Hiromi Hasama; Japan	Nadia Mecheri; France	Marijana Vićovac; FR Yugoslavia
Kumite −60 kg	Alexandra Witteborn; Germany	Chiara Stella Bux; Italy	Slađana Mitić; FR Yugoslavia
Kumite −60 kg	Alexandra Witteborn; Germany	Chiara Stella Bux; Italy	Mayumi Baba; Japan
Kumite +60 kg	Natsu Yamaguchi; Japan	Gloria Casanova; Spain	Elisabeth Fuchs; Austria
Kumite +60 kg	Natsu Yamaguchi; Japan	Gloria Casanova; Spain	Laurence Fischer; France
Kumite open	Yıldız Aras; Turkey	Nathalie Leroy; France	Eri Fujioka; Japan
Kumite open	Yıldız Aras; Turkey	Nathalie Leroy; France	Roberta Minet; Italy
Team kumite	France; Patricia Chéreau; Laurence Fischer; Nathalie Leroy; Nadia Mecheri	Spain; Gloria Casanova; Cristina Feo; Estefanía García; Sonia Gómez	Japan
Team kumite	France; Patricia Chéreau; Laurence Fischer; Nathalie Leroy; Nadia Mecheri	Spain; Gloria Casanova; Cristina Feo; Estefanía García; Sonia Gómez	Turkey; Yıldız Aras; Gülderen Çelik; Meral Ölmez

== Medal table ==
* Host nation (Germany)

Rank	Nation	Gold	Silver	Bronze	Total
1	France	6	6	4	16
2	Japan	4	2	4	10
3	Germany*	2	2	2	6
4	Spain	1	3	3	7
5	Senegal	1	1	0	2
6	Turkey	1	0	1	2
7	Croatia	1	0	0	1
7	Netherlands	1	0	0	1
9	Italy	0	3	5	8
10	Iran	0	0	3	3
11	FR Yugoslavia	0	0	2	2
12	Austria	0	0	1	1
12	Benin	0	0	1	1
12	England	0	0	1	1
12	Greece	0	0	1	1
12	Peru	0	0	1	1
12	United States	0	0	1	1
Totals (17 entries)		17	17	30	64
