= Jean-Luc Montama =

French karateka

Jean-Luc Montama (born 28 October 1956) is a French karateka who won a gold medal at the 1980 World Karate Championships at men's kumite+80 kg.
