= USA National Karate-do Federation =

National governing body of karate for the United States

- Sport: Karate
- Jurisdiction: United States
- Abbreviation: USA Karate
- Founded: April 14, 1996
- Affiliation: World Karate Federation
- Regional affiliation: North America
- Location: 1631 Mesa Ave., Ste A1, Colorado Springs, Colorado, United States

Official website
- www.usankf.org
- (United States)

USA National Karate-do Federation (also known as USA Karate) is the national governing body (NGB) of karate for the United States Olympic Committee and as such is the official Member National Association (MNA) of the World Karate Federation (WKF) in the United States.

The organization has complete authority over all decisions regarding U.S. national junior and senior team selections for World Karate Federation events. The tournaments that are held by the USA-NKF are big and nationwide and many famous martial artists attend the events. The USA Open is one of the largest international Black belt-only events in the world.

Every year the USA-NKF holds a competition, generally referred to as Nationals, where all the people who qualified in one of the many Qualifiers around the USA compete in different categories for the National Champion title.

The divisions are:

- Kata
- Korean Kata
- Okinawan Kata
- Mandatory Kata
- Kobudo
- Kumite

== History ==
The Amateur Athletic Union (AAU) was the official organization responsible for the running of all amateur sports in the United States, established in 1888. The AAU was officially charged with the organization and operation of many sports in the US. During this time, Karate was one of the committees in the organization and was not an independent governing body.

The Amateur Sports Act of 1978 enabled the governance of sports in the U.S. by organizations other than the AAU. This act made each sport set up its own National governing body (NGB). Each of these governing bodies would be part of the United States Olympic & Paralympic Committee, but would not be run by the committee. Thus, The USA Karate Federation was born.

USA National Karate-do Federation is the latest of previous organizations to claim to represent Karate in the United States. USA National Karate-do Federation replaces USA Karate Federation.

On April 24, 2021, the USOPC sent a demand letter to the USA-NKF for immediate reform and adoption of accountability measures. An investigation ordered by the USOPC found numerous actual and perceived conflicts of interest which show bias in favor of certain dojos' athletes. The USOPC has warned the USA-NKF their NGB status could be revoked if they fail to implement reforms.
