= Mervyn Etienne =

English karateka

- Style: Karate

Other information
- Website: bioperformance.co.uk/...

Mervyn Etienne was an English karateka. He was the winner of multiple European Karate Championships and World Karate Championships medals. After retiring from karate competitions Etienne was a "cognitive performance coach", physical therapist and co-founder of Bio-Performance Sciences Ltd.
