= 1998 World Karate Championships =

Karate competitions

- Host city: Rio de Janeiro, Brazil
- Dates: 15–18 October
- Main venue: Ginásio do Maracanãzinho

The 1998 World Karate Championships are the 14th edition of the World Karate Championships, and were held in Rio de Janeiro, Brazil from October 15 to October 18, 1998.

== Medalists ==
=== Men ===
Event	Gold	Silver	Bronze
Individual kata	Ryoki Abe; Japan	Michaël Milon; France	Javier Hernández; Spain
Team kata	Japan	Italy	France; Yves Bardreau; Stéphane Mari; Laurent Riccio
Kumite −60 kg	David Luque; Spain	Joël Barst; France	Hakan Yağlı; Turkey
Kumite −60 kg	David Luque; Spain	Joël Barst; France	Francesco Ortu; Italy
Kumite −65 kg	Alexandre Biamonti; France	Jean Carlos Peña; Venezuela	Célio René Vieira; Brazil
Kumite −65 kg	Alexandre Biamonti; France	Jean Carlos Peña; Venezuela	José Puertas; Spain
Kumite −70 kg	Haldun Alagaş; Turkey	Samad Azadi; Germany	Junior Lefevre; Belgium
Kumite −70 kg	Haldun Alagaş; Turkey	Samad Azadi; Germany	Shisua Shiina; Japan
Kumite −75 kg	David Félix; France	Antônio Carlos Pinto; Brazil	Allan Busk; Denmark
Kumite −75 kg	David Félix; France	Antônio Carlos Pinto; Brazil	Gennaro Talarico; Italy
Kumite −80 kg	Gilles Cherdieu; France	Ali Shaterzadeh; Iran	Zeynel Çelik; Turkey
Kumite −80 kg	Gilles Cherdieu; France	Ali Shaterzadeh; Iran	Wayne Otto; England
Kumite +80 kg	Marc Haubold; Germany	Yasumasa Shimizu; Japan	Óscar Olivares; Spain
Kumite +80 kg	Marc Haubold; Germany	Yasumasa Shimizu; Japan	Davide Benetello; Italy
Kumite open	Konstantinos Papadopoulos; Greece	Marcos Fernández; Spain	Alireza Katiraei; Iran
Kumite open	Konstantinos Papadopoulos; Greece	Marcos Fernández; Spain	Leon Walters; England
Team kumite	France	England	Spain; Marcos Fernández; Fernando García; Tomás Herrero; César Martínez; Jesús Montosa; Óscar Olivares; Óscar Vázquez
Team kumite	France	England	Germany

=== Women ===
Event	Gold	Silver	Bronze
Individual kata	Atsuko Wakai; Japan	Myriam Szkudlarek; France	Roberta Sodero; Italy
Team kata	Japan	United States	Spain; Susana Bueno; Miriam Cogolludo; Gema Méndez
Kumite −53 kg	Hiromi Hasama; Japan	Sari Laine; Finland	Nicole Jacobs; Germany
Kumite −53 kg	Hiromi Hasama; Japan	Sari Laine; Finland	Nadia Mecheri; France
Kumite −60 kg	Julliet Toney; England	Nathalie Leroy; France	Alexandra Witteborn; Germany
Kumite −60 kg	Julliet Toney; England	Nathalie Leroy; France	Marianne Tarva; Finland
Kumite +60 kg	Laurence Fischer; France	Lourene Bevaart; Australia	Izumi Nabeki; Japan
Kumite +60 kg	Laurence Fischer; France	Lourene Bevaart; Australia	Judith Nagel; Germany
Kumite open	Maria Cecília de Almeida; Brazil	Petra Piskačová; Czech Republic	Tania Weekes; England
Kumite open	Maria Cecília de Almeida; Brazil	Petra Piskačová; Czech Republic	Yıldız Aras; Turkey
Team kumite	Turkey; Yıldız Aras; Nurhan Fırat; Leyla Gedik; Meral Ölmez	England	Croatia
Team kumite	Turkey; Yıldız Aras; Nurhan Fırat; Leyla Gedik; Meral Ölmez	England	Spain; Gloria Casanova; Rosa Ortega; Beatriz Pérez

== Medal table ==
* Host nation (Brazil)

Rank	Nation	Gold	Silver	Bronze	Total
1	France	5	4	2	11
2	Japan	5	1	2	8
3	Turkey	2	0	3	5
4	England	1	2	3	6
5	Spain	1	1	6	8
6	Germany	1	1	4	6
7	Brazil*	1	1	1	3
8	Greece	1	0	0	1
9	Italy	0	1	4	5
10	Finland	0	1	1	2
10	Iran	0	1	1	2
12	Australia	0	1	0	1
12	Czech Republic	0	1	0	1
12	United States	0	1	0	1
12	Venezuela	0	1	0	1
16	Belgium	0	0	1	1
16	Croatia	0	0	1	1
16	Denmark	0	0	1	1
Totals (18 entries)		17	17	30	64
