= Tim Stephens (karateka) =

English karateka

- Born: Timothy Stephens; 1962 (age 63–64)
- Style: Karate

Timothy Stephens is an English karateka. He is the winner of multiple European Karate Championships and World Karate Championships Karate medals. In 2012 he was convicted of possession of child pornography.
