= Abdu Shaher =

English kareteka (born 1957)

- Born: 1957 (age 68–69)
- Style: Karate
- Rank: 8th Dan

Abdu Shaher (born 1957) is an English karateka. He is a winner of multiple European Karate Championships and World Karate Championships Karate medals.

== Criminal Conviction ==
In 2017 Shaher was convicted of rape.
