= 1980 World Karate Championships =

Karate competition

- Host city: Madrid, Spain
- Dates: 27–30 November
- Main venue: Palacio de Deportes

The 1980 World Karate Championships was the fifth edition of the World Karate Championships, and was held in Madrid, Spain in October 1980. It was the first tournament where women could participate but only in kata.

== Medalists ==
=== Men ===
Event	Gold	Silver	Bronze
Individual kata	Keji Okada; Japan	Masashi Koyama; Japan	Jorge Romero; Spain
Individual kata	Keji Okada; Japan	Masashi Koyama; Japan	Deogracias Medina; Spain
Kumite −60 kg	Ricardo Abad; Spain	Jean-Louis Granet; France	Fernando Rosuero; Spain
Kumite −60 kg	Ricardo Abad; Spain	Jean-Louis Granet; France	Junichi Sugiyama; Japan
Kumite −65 kg	Toshiaki Maeda; Japan	Zenichi Ono; Japan	Felipe Hita; Spain
Kumite −65 kg	Toshiaki Maeda; Japan	Zenichi Ono; Japan	José Arsenal; Spain
Kumite −70 kg	José Damián González; Spain	Antonio Martínez; Spain	Thierry Masci; France
Kumite −70 kg	José Damián González; Spain	Antonio Martínez; Spain	Danny Schenker; Netherlands
Kumite −75 kg	Sadao Tajima; Japan	Imamatsu; Japan	Wenceslao Aguilar; Mexico
Kumite −75 kg	Sadao Tajima; Japan	Imamatsu; Japan	Fred Royers; Netherlands
Kumite −80 kg	Tokey Hill; United States	Naomi Takukawa; Japan	P. Amarilla; Paraguay
Kumite −80 kg	Tokey Hill; United States	Naomi Takukawa; Japan	Otti Roethof; Netherlands
Kumite +80 kg	Jean-Luc Montama; France	Livi Whyte; Great Britain	Billy Blanks; United States
Kumite +80 kg	Jean-Luc Montama; France	Livi Whyte; Great Britain	Rolando Sías; Mexico
Kumite open	Giovanni Ricciardi; Italy	Billy Blanks; United States	Juan Pedro Carbilla; Spain
Kumite open	Giovanni Ricciardi; Italy	Billy Blanks; United States	Hisao Murase; Japan
Team kumite	Spain	Netherlands	France
Team kumite	Spain	Netherlands	Great Britain

=== Women ===
Event	Gold	Silver	Bronze
Individual kata	Suzuko Okamura; Japan	Mie Nakayama; Japan	María Moreno; Spain
Individual kata	Suzuko Okamura; Japan	Mie Nakayama; Japan	Marina Sasso; Italy

== Medal table ==
Rank	Nation	Gold	Silver	Bronze	Total
1	Japan	4	5	2	11
2	Spain	3	1	7	11
3	France	1	1	2	4
4	United States	1	1	1	3
5	Italy	1	0	1	2
6	Netherlands	0	1	3	4
7	Great Britain	0	1	1	2
8	Mexico	0	0	2	2
9	Paraguay	0	0	1	1
Totals (9 entries)		10	10	20	40
