= Pat McKay =

British karateka

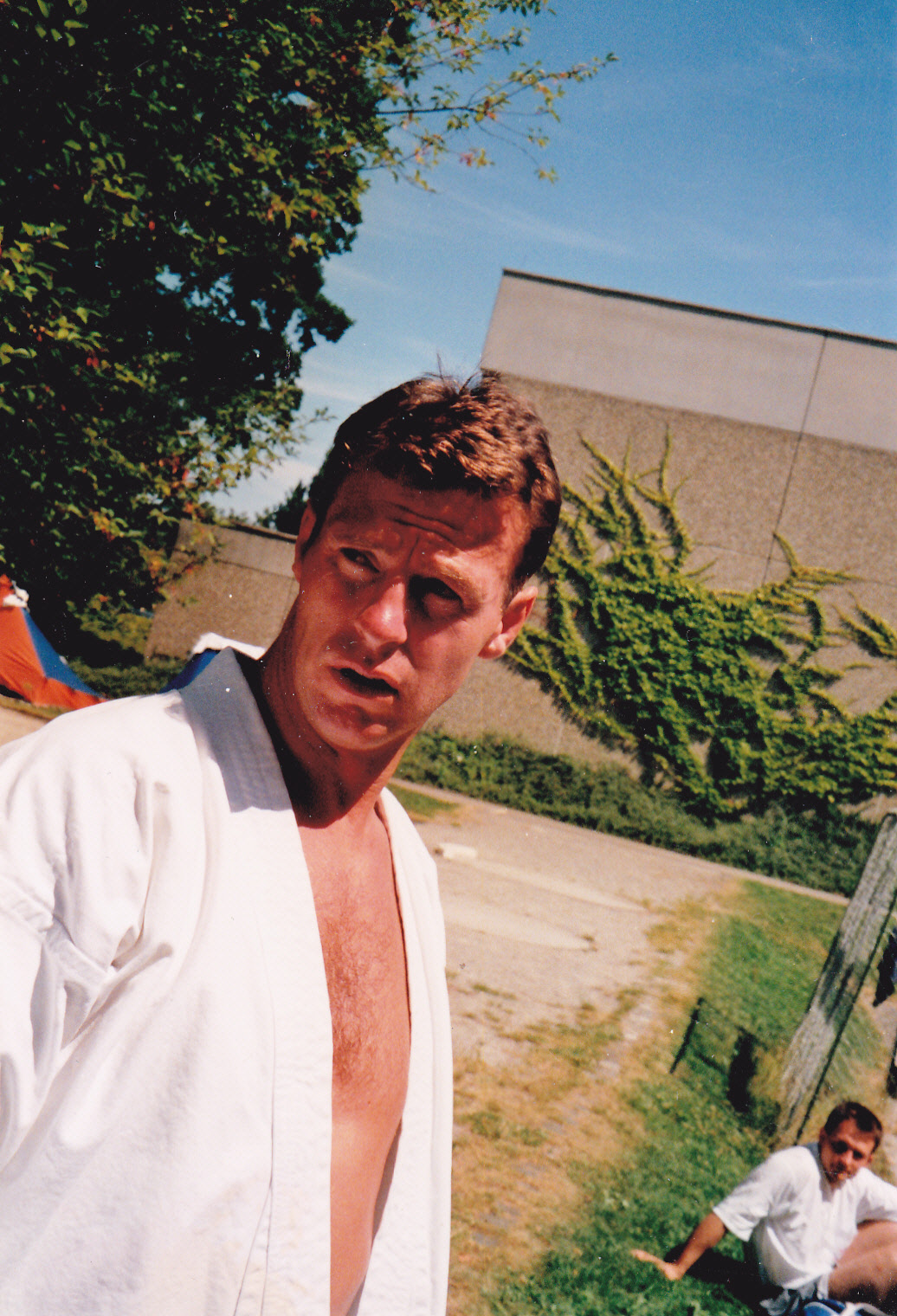
- Pat McKay in August 1990
- Born: Patrick James McKay; 29 May 1957 (age 69); Kilmarnock, Scotland, United Kingdom
- Style: Karate
- Rank: 5th dan karate

Patrick James "Pat" McKay (born 29 May 1957, Kilmarnock, Scotland) is a Scottish karateka. He has a fifth Dan black belt in karate and is a 13-time Scottish Champion and a 5-time winner of World Karate Championships. McKay became the first karate champion to win two world titles in a row.

== Career ==
He enrolled in Glasgow's Shukokai Karate Club. He made steady progress and took up gymnastics in an attempt to improve his agility. In 1978, still only a 4th Kyu, McKay took part in his first international tournament. He was selected to represent Scotland at the European Championships held in Ghent, Belgium. He failed to make it onto the podium but gained invaluable experience.

McKay changed clubs in the 1980s and started being trained by former Scottish teammate David Coulter, who formerly was top international competitor for Scotland and Great Britain.
