= Efthimios Karamitsos =

German karateka

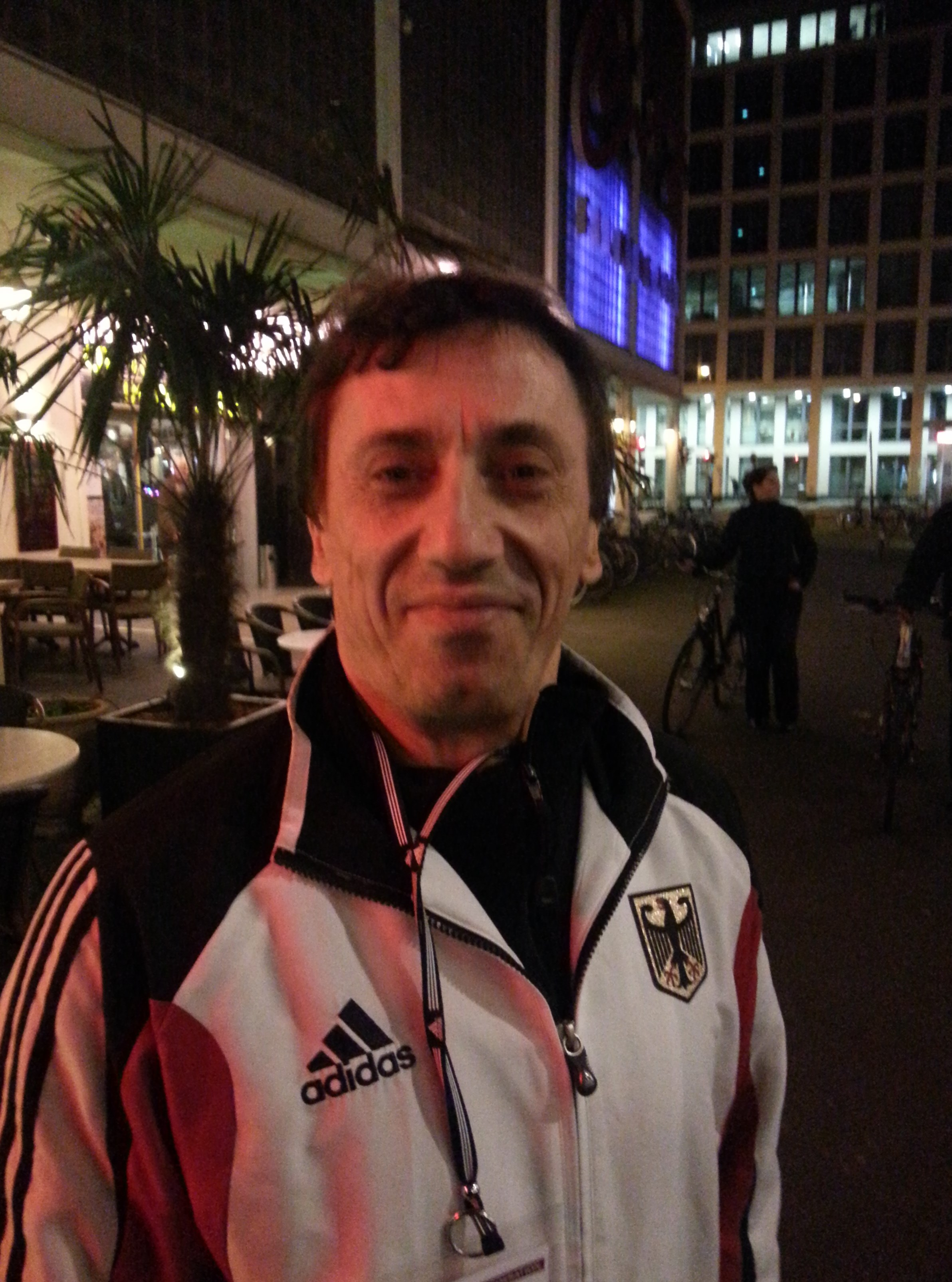
Kata national trainer Efthimios Karamitsos

Efthimios Karamitsos (born 1 August 1956 in Sykea, Greece) is a German karate teacher (8th Dan) and the author of various sports books.

== Career ==
Karamitsos began studying medicine in 1975 in Italy. At the same time, he trained Karate with Perlati and Hiroshi Shirai. In Germany, he studied sports science in Frankfurt am Main and continued his training with Hideo Ochi and Yasukasu Murai. He was successful in competitions. His major achievements were in the field of kata e.g. 1980 the 3rd place at the World Championship at Bremen, Germany.

He teaches karate in his dojo BudoCenter in Frankfurt am Main, Bornheim, and hosts international training courses.

== Achievements and awards ==
- 6x German Champion
- 6x European Champion
- 2x 3rd rank in World Cup
- "Silbernes Lorbeerblatt", awarded in January 1988 by Federal President Richard von Weizsäcker.
