= Jerome Atkinson =

English kareteka

- Style: Wado-ryu Karate

Other information
- Website: Official site

Jerome Atkinson is an English karateka. He is the winner of multiple European Karate Championships and World Karate Championships Karate medals.
