= 1972 World Karate Championships =

Karate competition

- Host city: Paris, France
- Dates: 21–22 April
- Main venue: Stade Pierre de Coubertin

The 1972 World Karate Championships are the 2nd edition of the World Karate Championships, and were held in Stade Pierre de Coubertin, Paris, France on April 21 and April 22, 1972.

== Medalists ==
Event	Gold	Silver	Bronze
Ippon	Luiz Tasuke Watanabe; Brazil	Billy Higgins; Great Britain	Ištvan Šipter; Yugoslavia
Ippon	Luiz Tasuke Watanabe; Brazil	Billy Higgins; Great Britain	Guy Sauvin; France
Team	France	Italy	Great Britain
Team	France	Italy	Singapore

== Medal table ==
Rank	Nation	Gold	Silver	Bronze	Total
1	France	1	0	1	2
2	Brazil	1	0	0	1
3	Great Britain	0	1	1	2
4	Italy	0	1	0	1
5	Singapore	0	0	1	1
5	Yugoslavia	0	0	1	1
Totals (6 entries)		2	2	4	8
