= Guusje van Mourik =

Dutch martial artist (born 1955)

- Born: 5 October 1955 (age 71); Zeist, Netherlands
- Style: Karate
- Rank: 4th dan karate and 2nd dan judo

Guusje van Mourik (born 5 October 1955, Zeist, Netherlands) she is a Dutch karateka, judoka and boxer. She has a 4th Dan black belt in karate, and is the winner of multiple World Karate Championships, and is in The Guinness Book of Records for winning the most karate medals. She was four times world champion, six times European champion and twenty five times national champion in this discipline in the class 60+ kilograms. Also, she was once Taiko ( Japanese ' drumming ' ) world champion and won several medals at the Dutch Judo National Championships. Guusje first found success she achieved in 1974 by winning a silver medal in judo. In 1982 she became Dutch and world champion karate. In 1987, Gussje was given Order of Orange-Nassau. In 1989 she made her debut as a boxer. In 1992 she became head coach of the women's karate team. Since retiring from competitive karate Guus is now a dental technician.

== Judo Medals ==
- 1974 Dutch Championships Tilburg Bronze Medal
- 1976 Dutch Championships Oss Silver Medal
- 1978 Dutch Championships Groningen Silver Medal
- 1979 Dutch Championships Haarlem Bronze Medal

== Karate Medals ==
- 1982 World Karate ChampionshipsGold Medal
- 1983 European Karate Championships Kumite Gold Medal
- 1984 World Karate Championships Kumite Gold Medal
- 1985 European Karate Championships Kumite Gold Medal
