= Toni Dietl =

German karateka

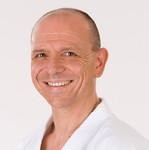
- Born: Antinous Dietl; April 2, 1961 (age 65); Würzburg, West Germany
- Style: Karate
- Rank: 7th dan karate

Toni Dietl is a German karateka (7 Dan), non-fiction author and former national coach in the Deutscher Karate Verband. He is a multiple winner of Karate World Championship and European Karate Championships medals. He is also the founder of the Kampfkunst Kollegium
