= David Coulter (karateka) =

Scottish karateka

- Born: David Michael Coulter; 25 August 1953 (age 73); Kilmarnock, Scotland, United Kingdom
- Style: Karate
- Rank: 8th Dan

Other information
- Website: Sakai Karate

David Michael Coulter is a Scottish karateka. Coulter was the winner of multiple World Karate Championships and European Karate Championships, in men's team kumite and men's −60 kg individual kumite.

His wife, Janet Coulter, co-founder of Sakai Karate Club died on the 3rd December 2025.
