= 1970 World Karate Championships =

Karate competition

- Host city: Tokyo, Japan
- Dates: 10–13 October

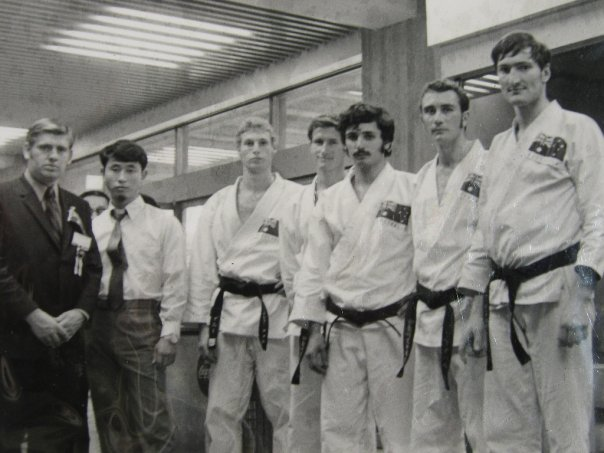
Paul Starling Karate World Championships 1970

The 1970 World Karate Championships are the 1st edition of the World Karate Championships, and were held in Tokyo and Osaka, Japan between October 10 and October 13, 1970.

== Medalists ==
Event	Gold	Silver	Bronze
Ippon	Koji Wada; Japan	John Carnio; Canada	Tonny Tulleners; United States
Ippon	Koji Wada; Japan	John Carnio; Canada	Dominique Valera; France
Team	Japan E	Japan C	Japan B

== Medal table ==
Rank	Nation	Gold	Silver	Bronze	Total
1	Japan	2	1	1	4
2	Canada	0	1	0	1
3	France	0	0	1	1
3	United States	0	0	1	1
Totals (4 entries)		2	2	3	7

== Participating nations ==
- Argentina
- Australia
- Austria
- Belgium
- Brunei
- Canada
- Chile
- France
- Great Britain
- Guatemala
- Hong Kong
- Indonesia
- Israel
- Italy
- Japan
- Mexico
- New Zealand
- Philippines
- Singapore
- South Korea
- Syria
- Thailand
- Trinidad and Tobago
- United States
- West Germany
- Yugoslavia
