= Marc Pyrée =

Guadeloupean karateka

Medal record

Men's karate

Representing France

World Games
Silver medal – second place	1981 Santa Clara	Kumite open
Bronze medal – third place	1989 Karlsruhe	Kumite open

Marc Pyree (born 2 June 1960 in Grand-Bourg, Guadeloupe) is a French karateka, who was part of the French kumite team that won gold at the 1994 World Karate Championships and at the 1980, 1981 and 1993 European Karate Championships.
