= 1975 World Karate Championships =

Karate competition

- Host city: Long Beach, United States

The 1975 World Karate Championships are the 3rd edition of the World Karate Championships, and were held in Long Beach, United States in 1975.

== Medalists ==
Event	Gold	Silver	Bronze
Individual	Kazusada Murakami; Japan	Junichiro Hamaguchi; Japan	Pedro Rivera; Dominican Republic
Team	Great Britain	Japan	Netherlands

== Medal table ==
Rank	Nation	Gold	Silver	Bronze	Total
1	Japan	1	2	0	3
2	Great Britain	1	0	0	1
3	Dominican Republic	0	0	1	1
3	Netherlands	0	0	1	1
Totals (4 entries)		2	2	2	6
