= Emmanuel Pinda =

French karateka

Medal record

Men's karate

Representing France

World Games
Silver medal – second place	1985 London	Kumite open

Emmanuel Pinda (born 7 January 1961 in Paris) is a French karateka. Pinda won multiple medals at the European Karate Championships and the World Karate Championships.

== Medals received ==
- 1988 World Karate Championships men's kumite+80 kg gold medal
- 1984 World Karate Championships of men's kumite Ippon gold medal
- 1988 European Karate Championships men's kumite+80 kg silver medal
- 1987 European karate Championships at men's kumite+80 kg gold medal
- 1987 European Karate Championships at men's kumite open bronze medal
- 1985 European Karate Championships at men's kumite open gold medal
- 1984 European Karate Championships at men's kumite open silver medal
