= José Manuel Egea =

Spanish karateka

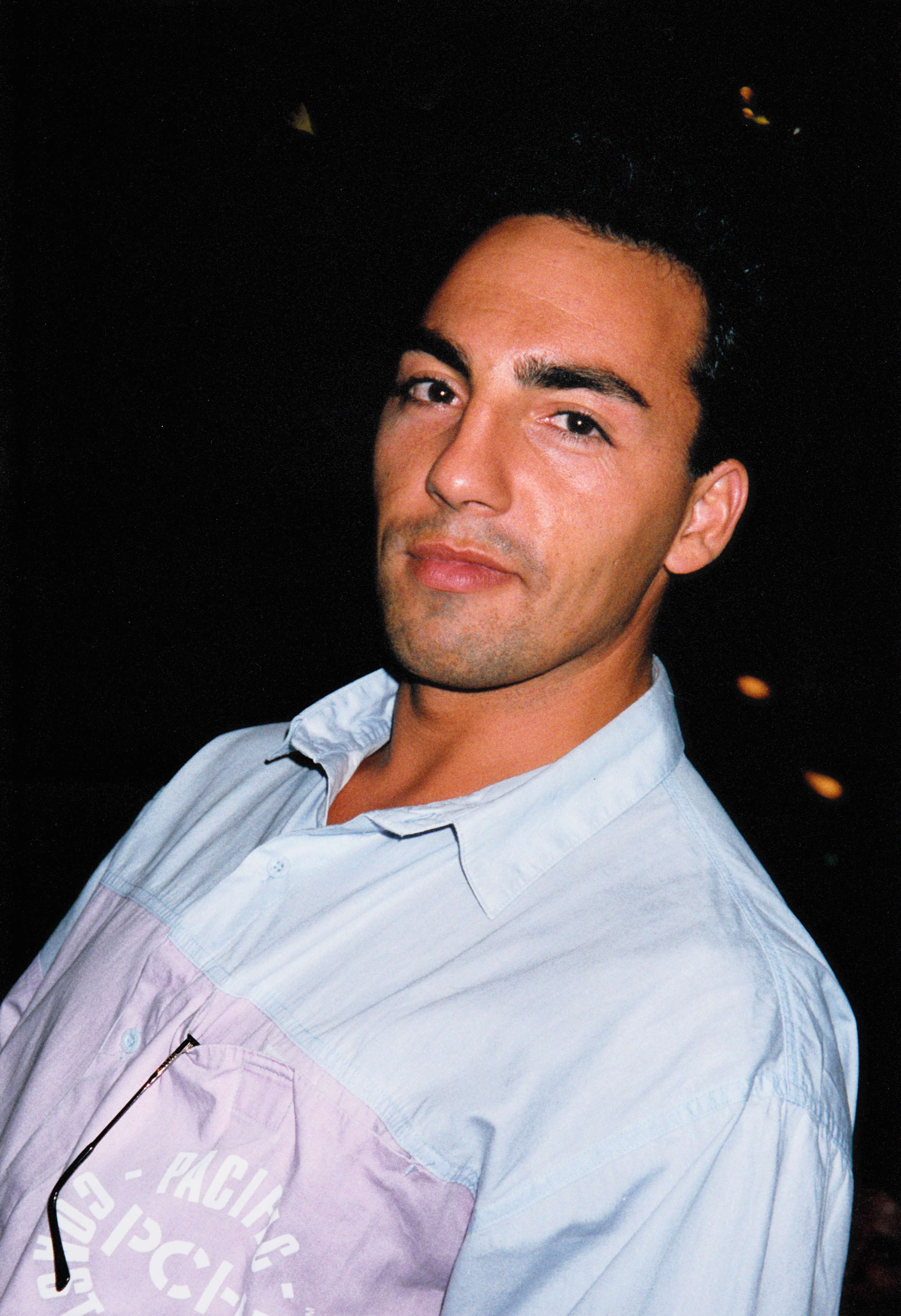
- Born: José Manuel Egea Cáceres; 20 February 1961 (age 65)
- Style: Karate
- Rank: 7th dan karate

José Manuel Egea is a Spanish karateka, born on 20 February 1964. He won multiple Karate World Championships in Kumite.
