= Karate World Championships =

Karate competition

Competition details
- Discipline: Karate
- Type: Kumite and Kata, biennial
- Organiser: World Karate Federation (WKF)

Divisions
- Current weight divisions: Male -60Kg,-67Kg, -75Kg, -84Kg and +84Kg. Female -50Kg, -55Kg, -61Kg, -68Kg and +68Kg.

History
- First edition: 1970 in Tokyo, Japan
- Editions: 26 (2023)
- Final edition: 2023 in Budapest, Hungary
- Most wins: Japan (214 medals)

The Karate World Championships, also known as the WKF World Karate Championships, are the highest level of competition for karate organized by the World Karate Federation (WKF). The competition is held in a different city every two years. Championships in the 2000s included Madrid in 2002, Monterrey in 2004, Tampere in 2006, Tokyo in 2008, and Belgrade in 2010. The competition was initially riddled with controversy regarding karate styles and the ruleset.

In 1980, women were first allowed to compete in the championships.

== Competition and events ==
=== Kumite ===
- Individual kumite – men and women
- Team kumite – men and women

==== Kumite Rules ====
The result of a bout is determined by a contestant obtaining a clear lead of eight points, having the highest number of points at time-up, obtaining a decision (hantei ), or by an accumulation of prohibited behaviors imposed against a contestant.

==== Scoring & Penalties ====
- Ippon (three points)
  - Jodan (head, face, neck) kicks
  - Any scoring technique delivered on a thrown or fallen opponent
- Waza-ari (two points)
  - Chudan (abdomen, chest, back, side) kicks
- Yuko (one point)
  - Tsuki (punch)
  - Uchi (strike)
- Prohibited behavior
  - Category 1
    - Techniques which make excessive contact, in regards to the scoring area attacked, or make contact with the throat
    - Attacks to the arms or legs, groin, joints, or instep
    - Attacks to the face with open hand techniques
    - Dangerous or forbidden throwing techniques
  - Category 2
    - Feigning or exaggerating injury
    - Exit from the competition area (jogai ) not caused by the opponent
    - Self-endangerment by indulging in behavior which exposes the contestant to injury by the opponent, or failing to take adequate measures for self-protection (mubobi )
    - Avoiding combat as a means of preventing the opponent having the opportunity to score
    - Passivity – not attempting to engage in combat (cannot be given after less than the last 10 seconds of the match)
    - Clinching, wrestling, pushing, or standing chest-to-chest without attempting a scoring technique or takedown
    - Grabbing the opponent with both hands for any other reason than executing a takedown upon catching the opponent's kicking leg
    - Grabbing the opponent's arm or karategi (uniform) with one hand without immediately attempting a scoring technique or takedown
    - Techniques which, by their nature, cannot be controlled for the safety of the opponent, and other dangerous and uncontrolled attacks
    - Simulated attacks with the head, knees, or elbows
    - Talking to or goading the opponent
    - Failing to obey the orders of the referee
- Warnings and penalties
  - Chukoku is imposed for the first instance of a minor infraction in the applicable category.
  - Keikoku is imposed for the second instance of a minor infraction in that category, or for infractions not serious enough to merit hansoku-chui.
  - Hansoku-chui is a warning of disqualification usually imposed for infractions for which a keikoku has previously been given in that bout; it may be imposed directly for serious infringements which do not merit hansoku.
  - Hansoku is the penalty of disqualification following a very serious infraction or when a hansoku-chui has already been given. In team matches, the offender's score will be zeroed and the opponent's score will be set at eight points.
  - Shikkaku is a penalty of disqualification in which the offender is expelled from the entire tournament. Generally, it is given for particularly severe infringements, beyond that which would normally result in hansoku being given. In a team match, the offender’s score is set to zero, and the non-offender’s score is set to eight points, as with a normal hansoku.

=== Kata ===
- Individual kata – men and women
- Team kata (synchronized) – men and women
- Team kata with bunkai

==== Rules ====
1. Conformity - with standards in form and style (Ryu-ha)

2. Technical performance:

- Techniques
- Stances
- Transitional movements
- Timing/Synchronisation
- Correct breathing
- Focus (Kime)
- Technical difficulty

3. Athletic performance:

- Strength
- Speed
- Balance
- Rhythm

4. Fouls:

- Minor loss of balance
- Performing a movement in an incorrect or incomplete manner
- Asynchronous movement
- Use of audible cues
- Belt coming loose
- Time wasting
- Cause injury in the execution of Bunkai

=== Para Karate ===
Para was first held in 2012 as a demonstration and was followed by the official Para Karate World Championships 2014,2016,2018,2021,2023 and 2025. In 2015 WKF recognised by the IPC.

=== Team World Championship / Cup ===
It was held since 2024.

== Editions ==
Edition	Year	Host city	Country	Events
1	1970	Tokyo	Japan	2
2	1972	Paris	France	2
3	1975	Long Beach	United States	2
4	1977	Tokyo	Japan	2
5	1980	Madrid	Spain	10
6	1982	Taipei	Taiwan	13
7	1984	Maastricht	Netherlands	13
8	1986	Sydney	Australia	15
9	1988	Cairo	Egypt	16
10	1990	Mexico City	Mexico	16
11	1992	Granada	Spain	16
12	1994	Kota Kinabalu	Malaysia	16
13	1996	Sun City	South Africa	17
14	1998	Rio de Janeiro	Brazil	17
15	2000	Munich	Germany	17
16	2002	Madrid	Spain	17
17	2004	Monterrey	Mexico	17
18	2006	Tampere	Finland	17
19	2008	Tokyo	Japan	17
20	2010	Belgrade	Serbia	16
+ Para Karate
21	2012	Paris	France	16
22	2014	Bremen	Germany	16
23	2016	Linz	Austria	16
24	2018	Madrid	Spain	16
25	2021	Dubai	United Arab Emirates	16
26	2023	Budapest	Hungary	16
Separate to Individual and Team Events
1	2024	Pamplona	Spain	4
27	2025	Cairo	Egypt	12
2	2026	Hangzhou	China	4
28	2027	Paris	France	12

- 1972: [[association championnet]]

== All-time medal table ==
The following reflects the all-time medal counts as of the 2025 World Karate Championships:

Rank	Nation	Gold	Silver	Bronze	Total
1	Japan	99	55	60	214
2	France	59	46	72	177
3	Great Britain	29	22	25	76
4	Spain	24	32	72	128
5	Italy	21	39	67	127
6	Turkey	15	13	36	64
7	Egypt	13	12	30	55
8	Iran	11	10	25	46
9	Netherlands	10	11	19	40
10	Germany	9	13	32	54
11	Azerbaijan	9	5	7	21
12	United States	6	12	21	39
13	Brazil	5	5	7	17
14	Serbia	5	2	7	14
15	Greece	4	4	5	13
16	Venezuela	4	3	13	20
17	Finland	4	3	8	15
18	Croatia	3	4	13	20
19	Russia	3	4	10	17
20	Sweden	3	4	6	13
21	Australia	3	3	10	16
22	Mexico	2	3	4	9
23	China	2	3	1	6
24	Austria	2	2	7	11
25	Serbia and Montenegro	2	0	6	8
26	Jordan	2	0	2	4
27	Georgia	2	0	1	3
27	Uzbekistan	2	0	1	3
29	Norway	1	5	4	10
30	Kazakhstan	1	3	10	14
31	Chinese Taipei	1	3	7	11
32	Vietnam	1	3	0	4
33	Slovakia	1	2	8	11
34	Switzerland	1	2	6	9
35	Netherlands Antilles	1	1	3	5
36	Chile	1	1	2	4
36	Hong Kong	1	1	2	4
38	Senegal	1	1	0	2
39	Benin	1	0	1	2
40	Estonia	1	0	0	1
40	Poland	1	0	0	1
40	South Africa	1	0	0	1
43	Hungary	0	5	3	8
44	Ukraine	0	3	9	12
45	Canada	0	3	5	8
46	Bosnia and Herzegovina	0	3	4	7
47	Morocco	0	2	3	5
48	Malaysia	0	2	2	4
48	Tunisia	0	2	2	4
48	Yugoslavia	0	2	2	4
51	Peru	0	1	8	9
52	Belgium	0	1	4	5
52	Denmark	0	1	4	5
54	Bulgaria	0	1	2	3
54	Kosovo	0	1	2	3
56	Czech Republic	0	1	1	2
56	Guatemala	0	1	1	2
56	Luxembourg	0	1	1	2
56	Montenegro	0	1	1	2
56	North Macedonia	0	1	1	2
61	Czechoslovakia	0	1	0	1
61	Paraguay	0	1	0	1
61	Puerto Rico	0	1	0	1
64	Algeria	0	0	3	3
65	Indonesia	0	0	2	2
65	RKF	0	0	2	2
65	Romania	0	0	2	2
65	Saudi Arabia	0	0	2	2
69	Argentina	0	0	1	1
69	Armenia	0	0	1	1
69	Colombia	0	0	1	1
69	Dominican Republic	0	0	1	1
69	England	0	0	1	1
69	IOA	0	0	1	1
69	Latvia	0	0	1	1
69	Philippines	0	0	1	1
69	Singapore	0	0	1	1
69	Slovenia	0	0	1	1
69	World Karate Federation-2	0	0	1	1
69	World Karate Federation-1	0	0	1	1
Totals (80 entries)		367	367	688	1,422

- IOA: In 1992, athletes from Yugoslavia competed independently under the Olympic flag. Yugoslav Tanja Petrovic won the bronze medal in the women's Kumite 60kg.
- RKF: Russian Karate Federation in 2021.
- ANA: Individual Neutral Athletes in 2023.

== See also ==
- Asian Karate Championships
- European Karate Championships
- Funakoshi Gichin Cup
