= Australian Karate Federation =

Australia karate federation

Karate Australia
- Sport: Karate
- Jurisdiction: National
- Abbreviation: (AKF)
- Founded: 1970
- Affiliation: World Karate Federation (WKF)
- Regional affiliation: Oceanian Karate Federation
- Headquarters: Airport West, Victoria

Official website
- www.akf.com.au
- (Australia)

Australian Karate Federation is the governing body for the sport of Karate in Australia.

== Brief history ==
Soon after the Australian Karate Federation was established in 1970, the National team represented Australia in the inaugural World Karate Championships staged in Japan the same year. After a humble start the Federation achieved a substantial number of members and kept growing with a membership of 123 affiliated styles.

The Federation in its initial years was headed by Don Cameron MP as president. The Federation thrived under the leadership of Cameron, who initiated the first two National Teams and paving the way for further development of sport karate in Australia. His successor John Newman worked hard to uplift the Federation and further strengthened it. The Federation gained further impetus from subsequent Presidents like John Halpin (1993 – 2007), and Michael Kassis (2007). The Federation grew under them with more sophistication and professionalism. Activities like administrative coaching and refereeing were introduced.

A member of the World Karate Federation (WKF), the Australian Karate Federation Inc. is affiliated with 170 countries all over the globe with access to both Junior/Cadet and Senior World Championships. Although relatively new, the Federation also expects to be inducted into the Olympics. The Federation also has Continental Union membership with ties with the Oceania Karate Federation. Regional development of sport karate is the goal of the Australian Karate Federation.

== Structure ==
The national body has eight state member associations.
