= Antonio Espinós =

Spanish karateka

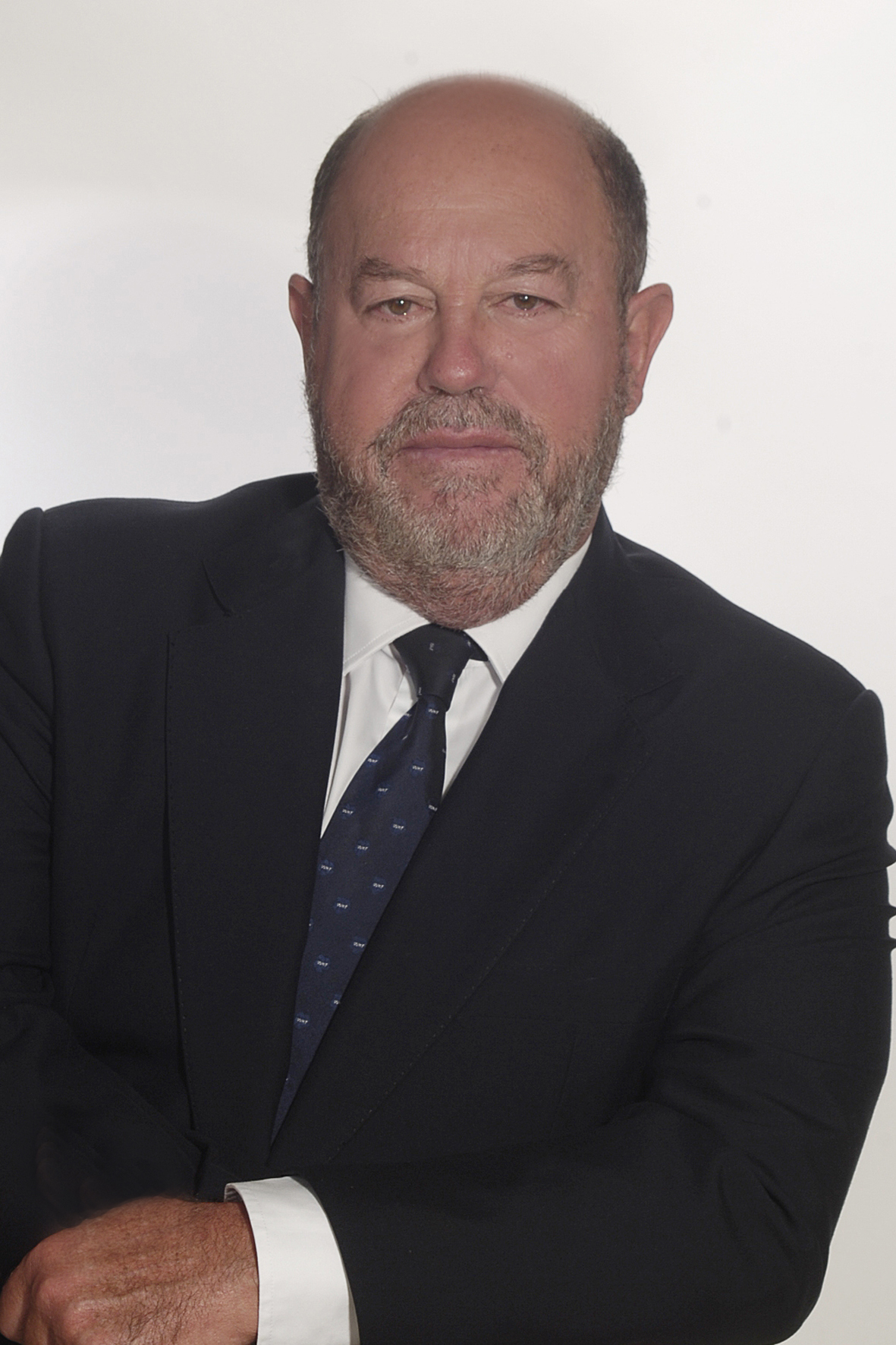
- Antonio Espinós Ortueta, president of the World Karate Federation and the European Karate Federation
- Born: Antonio Espinós Ortueta; 13 October 1947 (age 79); Bilbao, Spain
- Education: Madrid University
- Occupation: Sports Administrator

Antonio Espinós Ortueta (born 13 October 1947 in Bilbao, Spain), is the current president of the World Karate Federation (WKF) and of the European Karate Federation (EKF). Former member of the Spanish Karate National Team and former president of the Spanish Karate Federation, Mr. Espinós has headed the WKF since 1998 and the EKF since 1997. He is regarded as a major force behind the inclusion of karate in the programme of the 2020 Summer Olympic Games in Tokyo.

== Early life and education ==
Antonio Espinós Ortueta was born in Bilbao, Spain. Upon completing his elementary school education at the German School Madrid, he studied civil engineering at Complutense University of Madrid, graduating in 1973. Following his degree, Mr. Espinós earned an MBA from the EOI. From his graduation until 2014, he spent his working life holding management positions in the private sector. He speaks fluent Spanish, English, French and German.

== Karate career ==
His lengthy involvement with karate started as an active practitioner of the martial art. Antonio Espinós earned his Black Belt 1st Dan in 1973, and from 1971 to 1974, he was a member of the Spanish National Karate Team participating in major national and international competitions.

After ending a 3-year period as a high-level competitor, he focused on his professional career as a civil engineer, combining his profession with the activity of karate teacher. He obtained the 4th Dan degree in 1993. In 2014, he was honored by the Spanish Karate Federation with the 6th Dan degree in recognition of his achievements and contributions to the sport of karate.

== Sports administration ==
In 1984, Antonio Espinós was elected president of the Spanish Karate Federation. He headed the National Federation for twelve years until 1996, in a period marked by the growing popularity of the martial art in Spain.

During his time leading the Spanish Federation, Mr. Espinós also initiated his career in international sports administration. In 1994 he was elected first vice-president of the WKF, and one year later he was also designated first vice-president of the European Karate Federation. After finishing his tenure as the head of the Spanish Karate Federation, Mr. Espinós was elected President of the EKF in 1997. The continental sports organization has been driven by Mr. Espinós up to the present. Mr. Espinós was re-elected as president for an additional six-year term in the last elections, held in 2017 in Koçaeli, Turkey

One year after taking office as the chief of the EKF, Mr. Espinós was also appointed the top official of the World Karate Federation. Mr. Espinós has prevailed in the last four WKF elections, being re-elected as president for an additional six-year term in the 2016 elections held in Linz, Austria. Mr. Espinós is the third president of Karate’s international governing body, taking the position after Ryoichi Sasakawa (1970-1992) and Jacques Delcourt (1992-1998).

In addition to his career with the EKF and WKF, Mr. Espinós has held senior positions in many international sports institutions. He was appointed member of the ARISF Council from 2002 to 2005, and from 2007 until 2015 Espinós was on the SportAccord Council. He acted as vice-president of SportAccord from 2013 to 2015. Since 2016, he is the chairman of the GAISF Membership Commission.

In recognition of his contribution to the progress of sports both in his native country and around the world, Mr. Espinós has been distinguished with top honors from high sports institutions. He is the honorary president of the Spanish Karate Federation, has also been granted Spain’s gold medal for sporting merit, and received the Olympic order of the National Olympic Committee of Spain in 2010. Member of the Spanish Olympic Committee since 1984, Mr. Espinós has also been recognized with the World Fair Play Trophy by the International Fair Play Committee.
