= Pumphrey =

Pumphrey may refer to:

- Pumphrey, Maryland, a small town in Anne Arundel County in the United States
- Pumphrey, Texas, a small town in Runnels County in the United States

== People ==
- Alice Pumphrey (born 2006), English boxer
- Craig Pumphrey (born 1974), American presenter of Human Wrecking Balls with brother Paul Pumphrey
- Donnel Pumphrey (born 1994), American football player
- James W. Pumphrey (1832–1906), American livery stable owner who played a minor role in the assassination of Abraham Lincoln
- Jim Pumphrey (born 1941), former Australian rules footballer
- John Pumphrey (born between 1762-1764), Continental Army soldier in the 7th Maryland Regiment who was killed at the Battle of Camden
- Laurence Pumphrey (1916–2009), British diplomat
- Paul Pumphrey, American presenter of Human Wrecking Balls with brother Craig Pumphrey
- William Pumphrey (1817–1905), English Quaker photographer
- Don Pumphrey Jr., American attorney

=== Fictional characters ===
- Adelfa Pumphrey, character in The King of Torts, a novel written by John Grisham
- Humphrey Pumphrey, character in the television series George and Mildred
- Joseph Pumphrey, character the 1922 American novel Babbitt written by Sinclair Lewis
- Mrs. Pumphrey, character in books by James Herriot adapted as All Creatures Great and Small

== See also ==
- Pomfret (disambiguation)
- Pontefract
- Pontefract Castle
