= Cherupalli Vivek Teja =

Indian martial artist

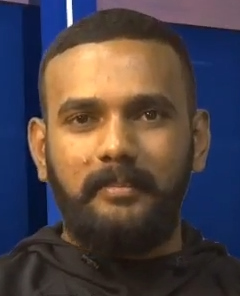
- Vivek Teja in 2018
- Born: 29 August 1992 (age 34); Nalgonda, Telangana, India
- Education: Bachelor of Technology (Electronics & Communications Engineering) from SRTIST college, Nalgonda, Telangana
- Occupation: Martial artist
- Years active: 2015–present
- Known for: Martial arts - Karate
- Notable work: 2 x USA Open Gold medalist 2019 & 2018.; Won 29 Gold, 18 Silver and 16 bronze medals in International, National, and state-level championships.
- Website: vivekteja.com

Cherupalli Vivek Teja (born 29 August 1992) is an Indian martial artist. He has been a martial arts fighter for 19 years. Cherupalli is the founder of the Human Weapon International, a self-defense training organization. Vivek Teja Cherupalli claims that he has trained more than 19,000 women in the art of self-defense. The 27-year-old Cherupalli, who has Judd Reid as his coach, is also training to be a light heavyweight (75 kg) category boxer.

== Career ==
Cherupalli Vivek Teja, won gold (Kumite 84 weight category) at the US Open International Karate Championship-2019, which was held in Las Vegas, United States. Vivek has 60 medals under his belt, 28 of them being gold. In 2019, Cherupalli was selected to represent the Indian Karate team in the WKF Karate 1 Series A Championship (WKF Ranking Tournament for Olympic 2020 standing), which held in South America, Santiago, Chile, from 20 to 22 September.

In 2017, Cherupalli won gold and silver medal in the Malaysian International Karate Championship.

Cherupalli also trained under former SAI boxing coach Emani Chiranjeevi. Previously, in 2016, Vivek had won the World Martial Arts Championships in Sydney, Australia, to become the World Martial Arts Champion (Karate division). Cherupalli Vivek Teja also plays the role of coach and instructor to his sister, Ramya Tejaswini Cherupalli, who is also a gold and bronze medalist in international karate championships.

== Competitions ==
- World Karate Federation Series A Championship, Santiago, Chile, 2019
- USA Open 2018 & 2019
- Common Wealth Championship, Durban, South Africa, 2018.
- Malaysian International Karate Championship, 2017
- Martial Arts Championship, Sydney, Australia, 2016

== Certifications ==
- International Referee Certificate by WUKO International Referee Council, India, February 2011.
- Diploma Certificate in InterContinental Open Karate Championship, India, 2006
