= Pumfrey =

Surname

Pumfrey is a surname. Notable people with the surname include:

- Bernard Pumfrey (1873–1930), English professional footballer
- Nicholas Pumfrey (1951–2007), styled The Rt Hon. Lord Justice Pumfrey, British barrister

== See also ==
- Pumphrey (disambiguation)
- Pomphrey
- Comfrey
