= Spanish Karate Federation =

National body for Karate in Spain

- Sport: Karate
- Jurisdiction: National
- Abbreviation: (RFEK)
- Affiliation: World Karate Federation (WKF)
- Regional affiliation: European Karate Federation

Official website
- www.rfek.es

The Spanish Karate Federation (Spanish: Real Federación Española de Karate (RFEK), is the national body for Karate in Spain. It's the only association authorised to send Spanish Karatekas to the Summer Olympics.
