= Human Wrecking Balls =

- Created by: BASE Productions Inc.
- Starring: Craig Pumphrey; Paul Pumphrey
- Country of origin: United States
- No. of seasons: 2
- No. of episodes: 20

Production
- Running time: approx. 0:22

Original release
- Network: G4
- Release: November 12, 2008

Human Wrecking Balls is an American television reality show that premiered on November 12, 2008 on the G4 television network.

== Details ==
Martial artists and breaking champions Craig and Paul Pumphrey demolish everything from boats and cars to houses using only their bare hands. For each challenge, they join forces with a team of experts in material science and engineering to review the object of their destruction from every possible angle before taking it apart, using physics and know-how to determine the most effective approach. The duo also enjoys a little friendly competition throughout the challenges. Each Human Wrecking Balls episode revealed the final outcome of the Pumphrey’s ripping and smashing, as well as the various experiments they put to the test.

Each episode contained a "Challenge" in which the Pumphrey brothers compete to either do or not do the episode's "Big Break". The big break was what Chad considers the most difficult thing for a human to break. The only time the winner of the challenge got to do something other than the big break was in "Trashing Hotel California" when the winner got to throw the television out the window. The first Episode of Season 2 saw a different format, where the loser had to do the "Big Break". (Even though Paul lost the challenge, but due to an injury while breaking the big propeller Craig did it instead.)

The show was renewed for a second season, featuring 10 episodes, which premiered November The show's future was uncertain after the second season. It was ultimately not picked up for a third season by G4.

== Filming ==
Each episode of Human Wrecking Balls takes roughly two full days to shoot, as Dawn Swain said in a 2008 interview with Ken Tuccio that:

The actual filming of each episode takes 2 full days. There is quite a bit of editing that goes on to condense it to 30 minutes. The episodes that were filmed inside a building, like the office, the hotel, and the movie theater, take much longer due to the confined space. For each new area the guys "break," the cameras have to be re-arranged, the lighting re-configured, and the crew moved to get just the right shot. The office, for example, took just about 30 hours to tape.

== Cast ==
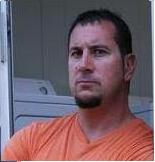
Paul Pumphrey

- Paul Pumphrey - A martial arts professional and a world champion breaker. Paul began breaking at a young age and spent hours in his friend's warehouse breaking concrete with Craig. Paul developed a signature shoulder ram technique to perform impressive breaks. He has set world records for breaking 23 slabs of concrete, which he did on the Steve Harvey Show. Paul has cited his greatest achievement as winning back-to-back titles in the World Breaking Championships. Paul went to high school with former WWE wrestler Rob Conway.
- Craig Pumphrey - A world-renowned award-winning martial arts expert and Guinness world record holding professional breaker. Craig's breaking and martial arts interest began at a young age. His first "big break" was diving off a shed and body slamming through 10 feet of ice. His philosophy is a mixture of Jiu-Jitsu, Pankration and a complete breaking system. He was inducted into the USAFPA Pankration Hall of Fame, International Karate and Kickboxing Hall of Fame and USA Martial Arts Hall Of Fame and holds a 7th-Degree Coral Belt. Craig is a decorated police officer for the New Albany (Indiana) Police Department.
- Chad Zdenek - Returns for a 2nd season as the resident structural engineer. With bigger, more complex breaks planned, he’ll have a much larger role this season. Chad will provide Craig and Paul with a methodical approach to the effective execution of each break. Chad’s professional resume includes 6 years at Boeing in the Rocketdyne Division working as a structural dynamics/stress engineer. He has also given presentations to NASA engineers outlining various structural and mechanical engineering procedures he created.
- Abigail Tallman - A certified nurse and the newest member of the series cast. She is currently stationed in the critical care unit at Brotman Medical Center in Culver City, CA where she takes part in surgeries and has no problem with blood or guts. Many times on-set she has been extremely concerned for the safety of the cast and crew due to the amount of destruction that occurs all around them. She’s been known to let out a sigh of relief when an episode wraps and the Pumphrey brothers get away with only minor injuries.

== Episode guide ==
=== Season 1 ===
Episode number	Original airdate	Episode name	Challenge
1-1	12 Nov 08	"Automotive Annihilation"	
1-2	19 Nov 08	"Trashing Hotel California"	
1-3	26 Nov 08	"Aviation Devastation"	
1-4	03 Dec 08	"Home Wreckers"	
1-5	10 Dec 08	"Three Little Pigs"	
1-6	17 Dec 08	"Office Obliteration"	
1-7	24 Dec 08	"That Sinking Feeling"	
1-8	7 Jan 09	"Cinema Smack Down"	
1-9	14 Jan 09	"Human Bowling Balls"	
1-10	21 Jan 09	"Club Carnage"	

=== Season 2 ===
Episode number	Original airdate	Episode name	Challenge
2-1	11 Nov 09	"Chopper Crunch"	Dismantle a Helicopter
2-2	18 Nov 09	"Hometown Havoc"	Home Demolition
2-3	25 Nov 09	"Pain at the Pump"	Destroying a Gas station
2-4	02 Dec 09	"Carnival Calamity"	Level a Carnival
2-5	09 Dec 09	"Rock the Bus"	Trash a Bus
2-6	16 Dec 09	"Razing the Barn"	Bull doze through a Barn
2-7	23 Dec 09	"Lights! Camera! Destruction!"	Tear down TV sound stage sets
2-8	6 Jan 10	"Arcade Armageddon"	Flatten a game room
2-9	13 Jan 10	"Post Office Pummel"	Destroy a Post Office
2-10	20 Jan 10	"Fast Food Ferocity"	Put a Fast Food Restaurant on a diet
