= Pomfret (disambiguation) =

Pomfret is a group of perciform fishes which includes about 20 species and belongs to the family Bramidae.

Pomfret may also refer to:

== People ==
- Pomfret (surname), a surname
- Earl of Pomfret, formerly a title in the Peerage of Great Britain

== Places ==
- Pontefract, West Yorkshire, still known locally as Pomfret, a name going back to Norman times
  - Pomfret Castle or Pontefract Castle, prison of Richard II, now a ruin
  - Pomfret Stakes, a horse race run at Pontefract
  - Pontefract cake or Pomfret cakes, a small, roughly circular black sweet, made of liquorice

=== United States ===
- Pomfret, Connecticut
  - Pomfret School, Connecticut
  - Pomfret Street Historic District
  - Pomfret Town House, an historic meetinghouse
- Pomfret, Maryland
- Pomfret, New York
- Pomfret, Vermont
  - North Pomfret, Vermont

=== Elsewhere ===
- Pomfret, North West, South Africa
- Pomfret, a fictional county town in the Inspector Wexford series of books

== Other uses ==
- Pomfret Manor Cemetery, Sunbury, Pennsylvania
- Pomfret Plantation, Marion, Maryland
- USS Pomfret (SS-391), a World War II submarine

== See also ==
- Pumphrey (disambiguation)
- Pommes frites (British English: chips; American English: French fries), potatoes cut into strips and deep fried
