= Makiwara =

Striking post in karate

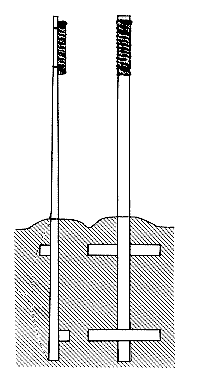
A diagram of the most common type of ground mounted makiwara

The makiwara (巻藁) is a padded striking post used as a training tool in various styles of traditional karate. It is thought to be uniquely Okinawan in origin. The makiwara is one form of hojo undō, a method of supplementary conditioning used by Okinawan martial artists.

== Use ==
The makiwara is used by karate practitioners to practice strikes in much the same way as a boxer uses a heavy bag. The makiwara develops one's striking ability by letting them experience resistance to punches, kicks and other strikes. A poor punch will bounce off the makiwara if the body is not in a position to support the energy generated by the strike. It also develops targeting, and focus, which is the ability to penetrate the target (i.e., opponent) to varying degrees of force.

The makiwara is very versatile, and can accommodate practice of open/closed hand strikes, kicks, knee strikes and elbow strikes. Okinawan methods emphasize striking from different angles. Most sources recommend a regimen of hitting the makiwara 50–100 times per day, with each hand. It is especially important to train the weaker side of the body as hard as, or harder than the dominant side.

A round elongated makiwara, traditionally made from rice straw bound with rope, is used by practitioners of kyūdō, Japanese archery. This makiwara is placed on a stand so that it is near shoulder height, and is used for close range practice from about 5–8 feet away. The archer is practically unable to miss the target from that range, affording the kyūdō practitioner the opportunity to practice his form, without thought for the target.

== Construction ==
Historically, the most common type consists of a single 7-to-8-foot-long (2.1 to 2.4 m) post driven into the ground, so that it is approximately shoulder height. The post is tapered from the bottom to a thickness of 1 cm at the top. Traditionally, a pad of rice straw (巻 maki "roll" + 藁 wara "straw") was bound to the top with rope to form a striking surface.

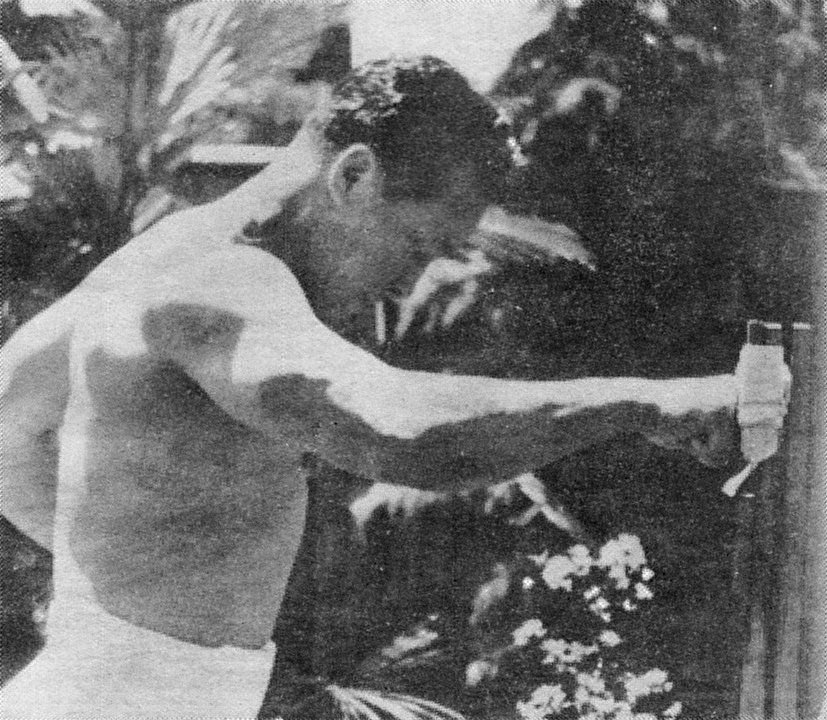
Punching a makiwara board

More modern variations of the standing makiwara use a metal or other base; or in some cases a concreted recess into the floor of the dojo. These bases may be constructed to affix the makiwara with through bolts; or capture the makiwara in a clamping action. Today the pad is less often made of straw, and more likely to be leather; often with a layer of rubber, duct tape or other tape over foam rubber; and in some cases black palm rope is used. Modern materials may last longer outdoors.

=== Soft makiwara construction and use ===
Soft makiwara are the type of makiwara that beginners use, but they are still essential for daily speed training for both beginners and experts alike. Soft makiwara are often positioned at a greater angle from vertical and an average punch will straighten the makiwara to a vertical position.

=== Stiff makiwara construction and use ===
After the user is well conditioned from using the soft makiwara, they often add additional training on the stiff makiwara to work on power training. The stiff makiwara is constructed by positioning the wood at a small angle from vertical towards the front. The average training punch aims to push the makiwara to a vertical position, or 90 degrees from the ground.

== Types of makiwara ==
=== Standing Makiwara ===
==== Shuri makiwara ====
The shuri makiwara is a flat board, measured to be as high as the instructor's breast bone. This makiwara is used when punching from a short stance.

==== Naha makiwara ====
The naha makiwara is also a flat board, but measured to be as high as the instructor's solar plexus. This makiwara is used traditionally by Goju Ryu practitioners, who train in a deep stance(Shiko dachi).Goju Ryu students are far more likely to use sanchin dachi in using the makiwara. The common makiwara in the Jundokan dojo in Naha, of Eiichi Miyazato are closer to shoulder height.

=== Ude makiwara ===
The ude makiwara differs in that it is round on all sides. This allows for the practitioner to use a variety of strikes and kicks on the makiwara, that could not be used on flat boards.

=== Hand Held Makiwara ===
Many martial artists use portable or hand held makiwara. Some are pocket sized, some may be mounted temporarily (in a Okinawa Taxi for instance). These makiwara are usually held in one hand and struck with the other. These makiwara allows the practitioner to condition other parts of the hand such as shuto, nukite (finger tips). This provides the capability of hand conditioning and training outside the dojo.

== See also ==
- Wolff's law (a possible explanation why bones strengthen with daily makiwara use)
- Stress fracture
- Boxer's fracture
- Mu ren zhuang
