= Breaking (martial arts) =

Technique that uses a striking surface to break objects

Breaking is a martial arts technique that is used in competition, demonstration and testing. Breaking is an action where a martial artist uses a striking surface to break one or more objects using the skills honed in their art form. The striking surface is usually a hand or a foot, but may also be a fingertip, toe, head, elbow, knuckle, or knee. The most common object is a piece of wood or brick, though it is also common to break cinder blocks, glass, or even a piece of metal such as steel bars. Glass is usually discouraged, since its shards may cause injury when broken.

Breaking can often be seen in karate, taekwondo and pencak silat, but not all styles of martial arts place equal emphasis on it or use it. In styles where striking and kicking are less important and there is an emphasis on grappling or weaponry, breaking is less prominent. Traditional Japanese martial art schools place little, if any, emphasis on board-breaking, although the art of breaking objects was known as tameshiwari (試し割り), while the similar practice of Tameshigiri or 'test cutting' is used in sword arts.

== Types ==
Competitive breaking is categorized into artistic impression (creative routines), speed breaking (items broken in a set time), power breaking (maximum items broken in a single strike), and non-spaced power breaking (items stacked without spacers to test maximum force transfer). There are several certified breaking categories in various journals of world records such as the Guinness Book. In a demonstration, a martial artist exhibits his or her skill by executing an impromptu or choreographed sequence of breaks for an audience. Martial arts schools sometimes demonstrate challenging breaks in order to gain publicity and inspire enrollment or attendance.

During promotion testing, many styles of martial arts require that students demonstrate their skills by executing breaks; the difficulty of a required break depends on the rank for which the student is testing. Failure to execute a required break is often sufficient grounds for failure of a promotion test.

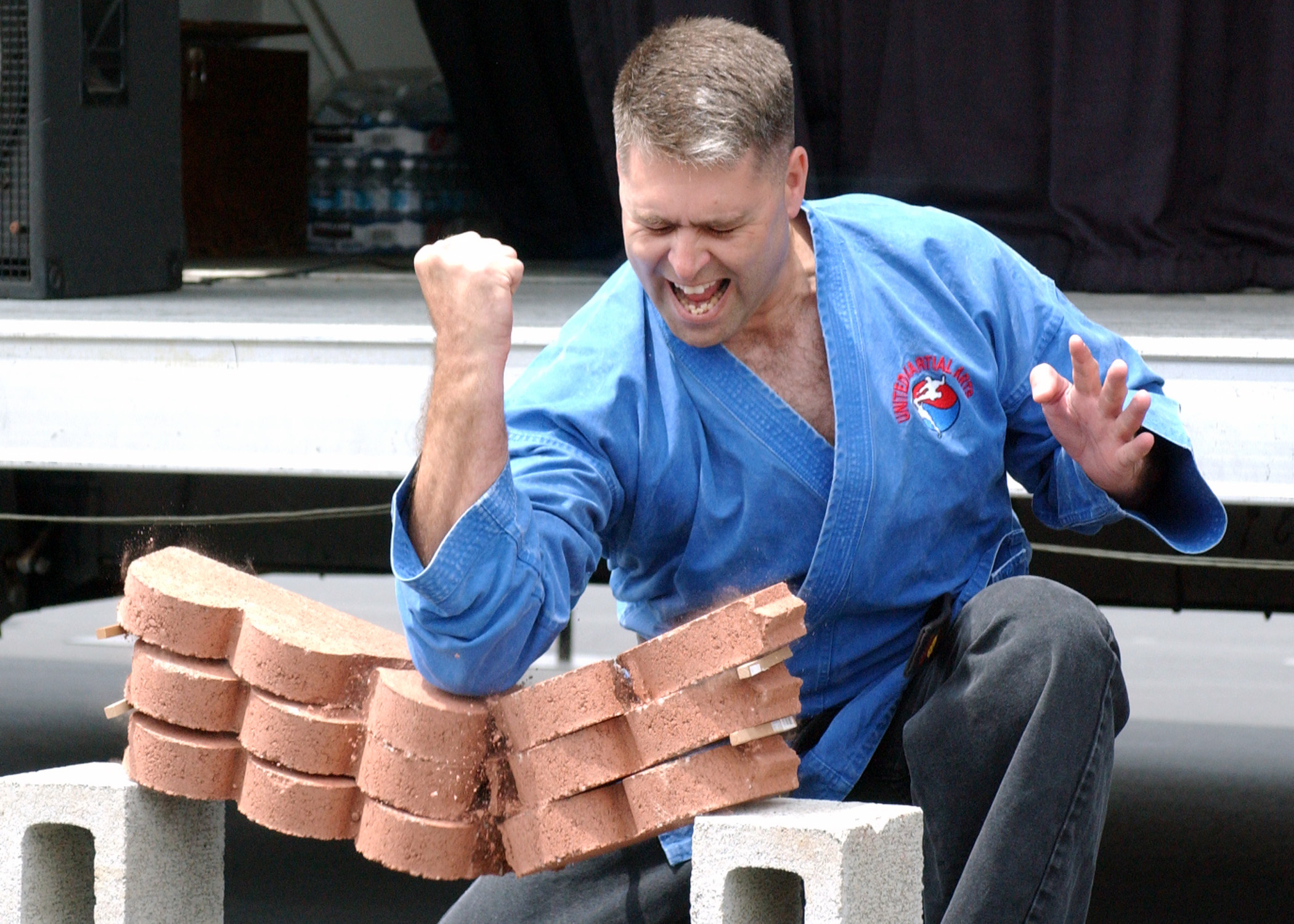
A brick-breaking demonstration

== Materials ==
Wooden boards are the most common breaking item in most martial arts, Individual boards used may range from nominal sizes as small as 6 in × 12 in × 1 in (152 mm × 305 mm × 25 mm) to as large as 12 in × 12 in × 1 in (305 mm × 305 mm × 25 mm) (a board with a nominal thickness of 1″ has an actual thickness of .75 in (19 mm)). The typical adult testing board is approximately 10 in × 12 in × 1 in (254 mm × 305 mm × 25 mm).

The grain of the board must be cut so as to be parallel with the striking hand.

Children may use narrower and thinner boards, with 4- and 5-year-olds sometimes breaking boards as small as 4 in × 12 in × .5 in (102 mm × 305 mm × 13 mm).

There are also re-breakable plastic boards made of different composites which can vary the difficulty level involved in breaking and reduce wastage, that are becoming more common.

== Technique ==
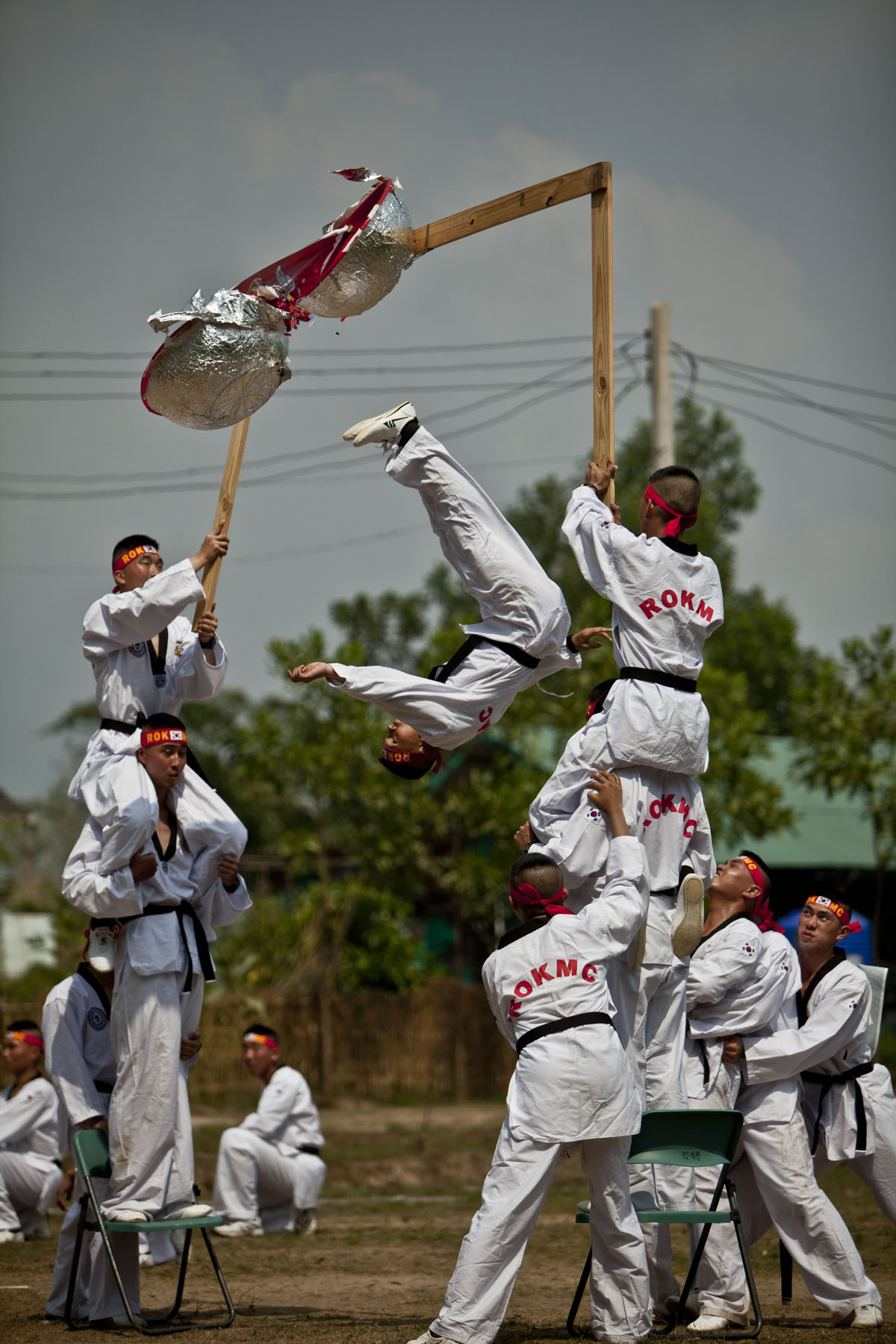
Kyukpa, the Taekwondo breaking techniques, focusing on complex aerial acrobatics and flying kicks

In general, breaking is used both as a method of measuring force of strikes for martial artists, as there was no other way to do this and only recently have devices such as accelerometers been used in martial arts, and as a measurement of mental fortitude, the ability of the mind and body to overcome.

Generally, a martial artist engaged in breaking will practice by repeatedly hitting hard surfaces. Masutatsu Oyama, a famous breaker who was known for breaking the horns off bulls, would use trees. In karate, a device called a makiwara is used; this device has found more popular use by practitioners of other martial arts today. In the past, Shaolin and other earlier martial artists would use many different types of devices in order to condition themselves, not always for simply breaking, but using the same concepts used today. For instance, Iron Palm, Iron Shin, Iron Shirt, Iron Head, and other types of training center around conditioning various parts of the body so they could withstand or give blows such as what is seen today in martial arts breaking. Many Chinese systems also are of the school of thought that "internal energy" or Chi is used when breaking, which is not dependent upon muscle strength and body weight.

The general principles used in martial arts breaking training is similar to the same principles used for most athletics. The body adapts to stress. There are generally three areas a martial arts breaker wishes to force their body to adapt to: the bones, the skin (calluses), and muscles (for both mass and speed). The general principle here — for instance, for the bones — is found in Wolff's law, which states that the skeletal system will, after healing, be stronger if injury is put to it. Craig Edmunds demonstrates this theory after breaking hand in seminar measuring bone density then measuring bone density after healing. In this manner the breaking practitioner operates not unlike a bodybuilder who works out with weights, then takes a period of rest to heal and allow the muscles to come back stronger.

This kind of training is called "progressive resistance training". Often differences in body structure can be seen in the form of calcium deposits between a breaking practitioner and a non-practitioner. Mike Reeves, a champion breaker, advocates in his book the usage of a makiwara and knuckle push-ups. With knuckle push-ups, he recommends starting on softer floor material and working your way up to concrete.

USBA/WBA Founder Drew Serrano, producer of the documentary "Breaking All Records", encourages practitioners to gradually increase the difficulty and amount of a material to avoid injury. He suggests that beginners should start with wood boards and increase the amount as technical prowess increases. Once a level of comfort, both physically and mentally, is reached, harder materials such as concrete can be attempted.

There are safety concerns with martial arts breaking, so experts encourage learners to seek out an instructor. There are many small bones of the foot and hand which need to be very carefully and slowly conditioned for safety. Repeated damage to the extensor capsules of the knuckles can lead to long term problems with dexterity.

=== Speed, Power, Soft, and Impulse ===
There are generally 3 classifications of breaks: speed breaks, power breaks, and soft breaks. Additionally, there is a 4th, lesser-known, classification known as the impulse break.

Speed breaks are breaks where the striking object is not held in place. The only way to break the object is to strike the surface with sufficient speed at a focused point of impact. Sometimes a board to be broken is held lightly between two fingers by a person; an advanced dan test may involve an attempt to break a board as it falls through the air. Regardless of the strength of the striker, the board will only break if it is struck with sufficient velocity.

Power breaks are breaks where the striking object is supported. Either the break will employ human holders for horizontal, angular, or upward vertical strikes, or the break will require that the objects be stacked for downward vertical strikes. For a stacked break the object is placed on sturdy supporting objects, such as concrete blocks, that are placed on the ground. Many color belt (belts before black belt) promotion testing breaks are power breaks—it is substantially easier for an inexperienced person to muster sufficient energy to break a wooden board with a power break (Note, this is not true for all breaks). The vast majority of these employ human board holders. Often a stronger or more powerful striker may substitute some strength for technique and successfully accomplish the break. Most records that are cataloged are for power breaks. It is very common for black belt tests to use bricks, concrete patio blocks, or several boards stacked on top of supporting objects for challenging downward strikes.

The third method, soft breaks, also known as "ki" breaks almost always involve the use of "flat hand" strikes; primarily the palm, as it's easier to accomplish a successful break with forward momentum, but sometimes the back of the hand. The material is usually supported, horizontally, on two ends. The breaker raises their hand and lets it fall with no tension or significant flexing of the muscles, instead relying mostly on gravity, in order to palm strike the material. The material is broken by a complete energy transfer all the way through, in a direct line from the palm to the other side of the material. The impact also passes through a wider, more dispersed area and from a martial art perspective therefore causes more damage than other strikes, if delivered to a human adversary. This break is akin to striking a person with a slap, although more energy is transferred into the target than what is typically conveyed by a mere slap.

Though fundamentally different, the 4th kind of break — the impulse break — is often confused with a speed break, because the striking implement often moves at a high velocity, despite the success of the break not depending on such speed. The energy transmission from an impulse break derives not from mass displacement, but from wave transmission (e.g. as an ocean wave hits a beach). The mass of the hand, foot, etc. typically does not travel through the medium, but only goes as far as necessary to deliver the wave. This results in an extremely brief contact with the face of the brick or board and the wave itself causes the striking surface to flex and buckle.

=== Pegged vs. unpegged (spaced vs. unspaced) ===
There are two types of multiple stacked board settings: pegged (spaced) and unpegged (unspaced). Unpegged stacks are where multiple items are stacked directly on top of each other.

Pegged stacks are stacks where multiple items are stacked with spacing items (often referred to as spacers) between them, usually wood spacers. "Unpegged" stacking allows a direct transfer of kinetic energy and the striker must maintain peak force much longer than a "pegged" stack as the striker moves down through the pile they are encountering the resistance of each board individually instead of creating enough force to flex and break an entire stack unspaced.
