= Craig Pumphrey =

American martial artist

- Born: January 24, 1974 (age 52)
- Occupations: Television presenter and martial artist
- Known for: Presenter of Human Wrecking Balls

Craig Pumphrey (born January 24, 1974) is a martial arts expert and Guinness World Record-holding professional breaker.

== Biography ==
Pumphrey was promoted to Black Belt by Grand Master Townsley in 1998 and has since been promoted to a 9th Degree Red Belt October 17, 2026, by Red Belt Dave Sixel. He was inducted into the USAFPA Pankration Hall of Fame, International Karate and Kickboxing Hall of Fame, and USA Martial Arts Hall of Fame. Pumphrey is a professional armwrestler,

Pumphrey is a retired police officer for the New Albany Indiana Police Department.

With his brother Paul, he presents the television show Human Wrecking Balls.
