= Jim Pumphrey =

Australian rules footballer

Personal information
- Full name: Jim Pumphrey
- Born: 2 December 1941 (age 84)
- Original team: Garfield
- Height: 180 cm (5 ft 11 in)
- Weight: 80 kg (176 lb)

Playing career^{1}
Years	Club	Games (Goals)
1962	South Melbourne	7 (2)
- ^{1} Playing statistics correct to the end of 1962.

Jim Pumphrey (born 2 December 1941) is a former Australian rules footballer who played with South Melbourne in the Victorian Football League (VFL).
