= Hojo undō =

Style of martial arts training

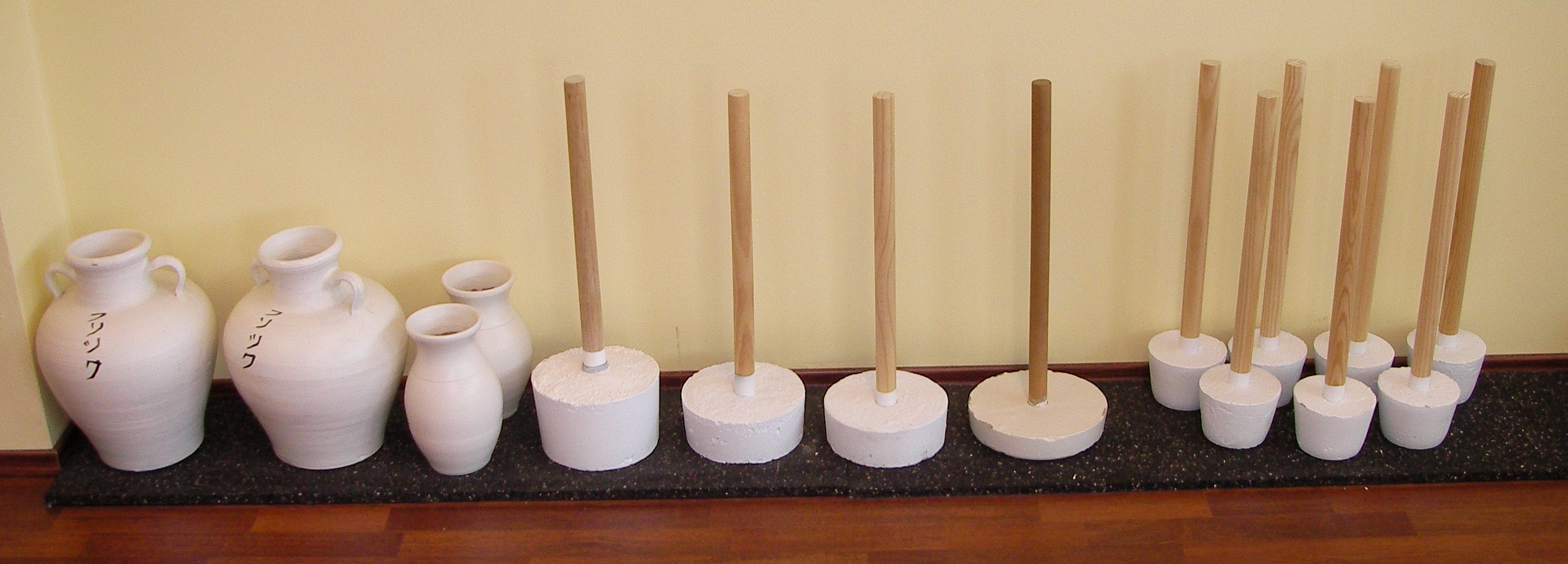
Some nigiri game and chi ishi

Hojo undō (補助運動) is a Japanese language term, translated as "supplementary exercises", that refers to conditioning exercises used in martial arts, especially in karate. Hojo undō training was designed to develop ambidextrous physical strength, stamina, muscle coordination, speed, and posture. This style of training uses simple, traditional devices made from wood and stone.

== Weighted items ==
The weighted items used in this training are also known as kigu undo (機具運動, "tool exercises")

=== Chi ishi ===
Chi ishi (鎚石), meaning "stone mallet" or "weighted levers", are concrete weights attached to a wooden pole. The practitioner grips the end of the wooden pole opposite the concrete weight, and moves the wrist and arms in motions used in techniques normally used in kata or against opponents. This weighted training mostly helps to strengthen the fingers, hands, arms, shoulder, and chest.

=== Ishi sashi ===
Ishi sashi (石錠, "stone padlock") are hand-held weights in the shape of padlocks, traditionally made of stone. They are also known as Shísuǒ (石锁) in Chinese.

=== Tetsu geta ===
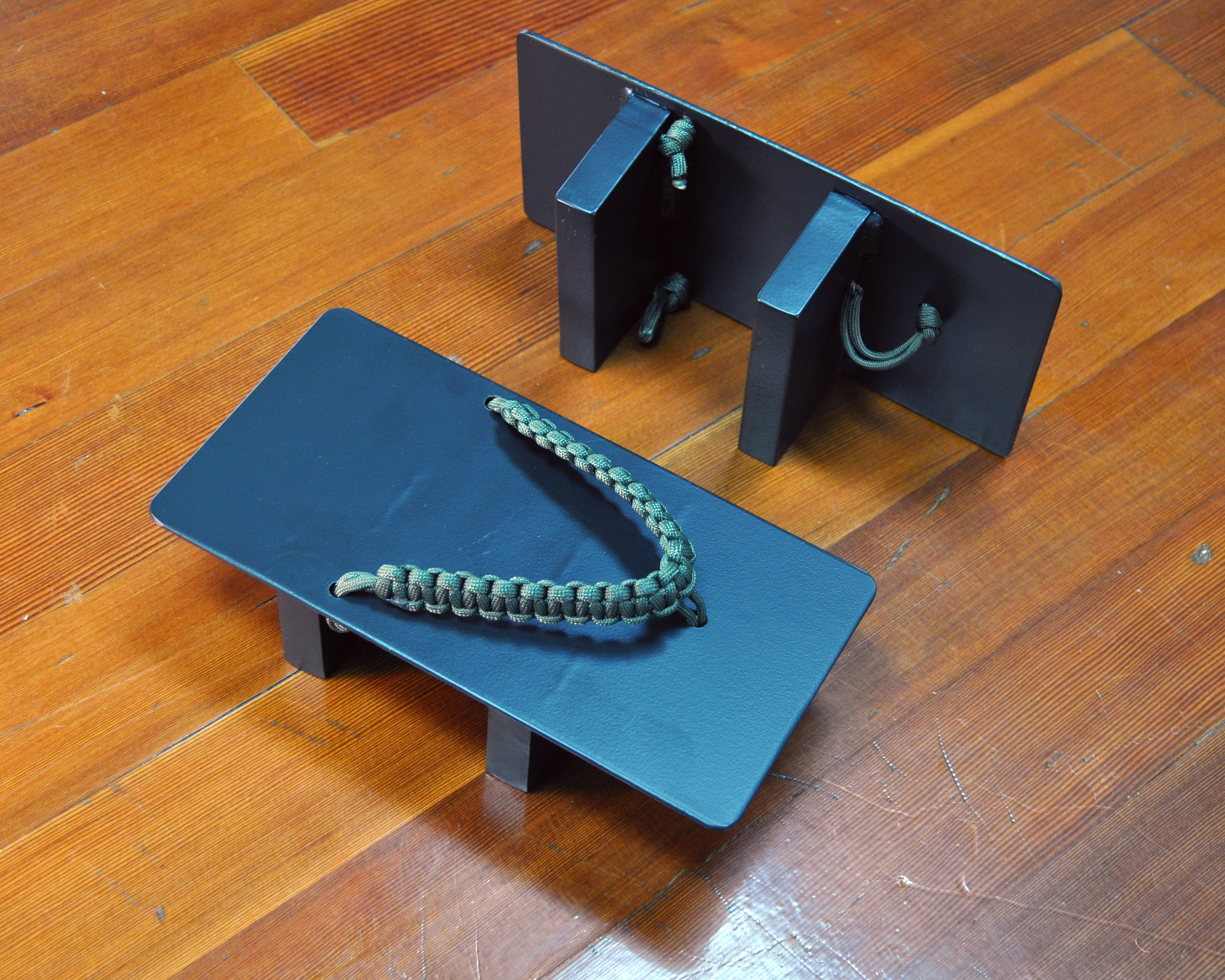
Tetsu Geta

Tetsu geta (鉄下駄, "iron clogs") are worn like sandals, but require gripping the clogs with one's toes. The practitioner moves around and kicks while wearing them. The extra weight required to move the foot strengthens the leg for kicks.

=== Nigiri game ===
Nigiri game (握り甕, "gripping jars") are ceramic jars filled with sand to different weights. The jars are gripped around a lipped rim. The practitioner moves in varying stances while holding the jar in order to strengthen the arms, shoulders, back, legs, and grip.

=== Makiage kigu ===
The makiage kigu (巻揚器具, "wrist roller") is a weight hanging by a rope from a wooden handle. The practitioner grasps the handle with the weight hanging in the middle, and twists the handle to wrap the rope around the handle. The handle is raised and lowered throughout the twisting to strengthen the wrists.

=== Tan ===
A tan (担), meaning "to shoulder" or "to carry on one's back", is similar to a modern barbell, made with a wood post and concrete weights on both ends.

== Conditioning ==
=== Makiwara ===
The makiwara (巻き藁, literally "wound straw") is a striking board used to practice striking a target that provides resistance. There are two types of makiwara: age-makiwara (上げ巻藁) (hung from the ceiling) and the more common tachi-makiwara (立巻藁) (secured in the ground).

Of the tachi-makiwara, there are two variations: flat and round. The flat makiwara is a board mounted in the ground with some type of padding on the top. The practitioner stands in front of the makiwara and strikes the top. The round ude-makiwara has a similar construction, but is round on all sides. This allows additional techniques to be practiced.

=== Jari bako ===
The jari bako (砂利箱, "gravel/pebble box") is a box or bowl filled with smooth stones. Before this, the box is filled with sand, known as suna bako (砂箱). At the beginning of this exercise, the box is filled with dry rice that is used by striking one's fingers into it. This conditions the fingers and fingertips.

=== Kongoken ===
The kongoken is a metal bar formed into an oval that can vary in weight and is used to condition the arms, legs, strengthen the wrists and core. This was used by wrestlers in Hawaii, and adopted into the hojo undō by Chojun Miyagi.

=== Tou ===
A tou (とう), also known as taketaba (竹束, "bamboo bundle"), is simply a bundle of bamboo tied together either at both the top and bottom or tied in the middle. This is used similar to the jari bako by striking the fingers into it. In American Punk drumming culture, musicians have been known to perform a similar exercise with fiberglass splinters.
