= Paul Pumphrey =

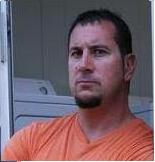
- Occupations: Television presenter and martial artist
- Known for: Presenter of Human Wrecking Balls

Paul Pumphrey is a martial arts professional and a world champion breaker.

== Biography ==
Paul began breaking at a young age and spent hours in his friend's warehouse breaking concrete with his brother, Craig. Paul developed a signature shoulder ram technique to perform impressive breaks. He has set world records for breaking 23 slabs of concrete, which he did on the Steve Harvey Show. Paul has cited his greatest achievement as winning back-to-back titles in the World Breaking Championships. Paul went to high school with former WWE wrestler Rob Conway. With his brother Craig, he also presents the television show Human Wrecking Balls.
