= Pomfret (surname) =

Pomfret is a surname. Notable people with the surname include:

- Ernie Pomfret (1941–2001), British steeplechase runner
- John Pomfret (poet) (1667–1702), English 17th-century poet and clergyman
- John Pomfret (journalist) (born 1959), formerly The Washington Post’s bureau chief in Beijing and Los Angeles, and author of Chinese Lessons
- John Edwin Pomfret (1898–1981), American college president
- William Pomfret (1823–1902), English banker and politician

== See also ==
- Earl of Pomfret
