= Pomphrey =

Pomphrey is a surname. Notable people with the surname include:

- Bob Pomphrey (born 1944), English cricketer
- Thomas Canfield Pomphrey (1881–1966), Scottish architect
