= Oceanian Karate Federation =

International sports governing body

Oceania Karate Federations
- Abbreviation: OKF
- Legal status: Federation
- Headquarters: Headquarters of the Oceania is situated in the country/region the elected President resides.
- Location: Oceania
- Region served: Oceania Continental countries/regions
- Members: 13 Affiliated Countries
- Official language: English is the official language. If any question in respect to the sport or technique of karate, it will be referred to the original Japanese text.
- President: Mr Michael Kassis of Australia
- Website: http://okf.auskarate.com/

The Oceanian Karate Federation (OKF) is the governing body of sport karate of about 12 countries of national karate federation in the Oceania.

The (OKF) is a non-governmental continental organisation and performs its activities on an amateur basis in compliance with the principles set forth in the Olympic Charter duly recognised by the World Karate Federation (WKF) is the largest international governing body of sport karate with over 198 member countries. It is the only karate organisation recognised by the International Olympic Committee and has more than fifty million members.

The (OKF) organises the Oceanian Championships, the Senior, U21, Junior and Cadet OKF Championships every year and participates in World Karate Federation (WKF) World Karate Championships. The Current President of the Oceanian Karate Federation (OKF) is Mr Michael Kassis of Australia.

== History of OKF ==
The Oceanian Karate Federation (OKF) was founded in 1973 with original name The Asian Pacific Union of Karatedo Organisations (APUKO) and The 1st Asian Pacific Karate-Do Championships was held in Singapore and total 12 Countries are participated.

In the year of 1992 The Asian Pacific Union of Karatedo Organisations (APUKO) was split into the Asian Union of Karatedo Organisations (AUKO) later Asian Karatedo Federations (AKF) and the Oceanian Karate Federation(OKF)

== Members ==
- Oceanian Karate Federation (OKF)

13 National Federation Member

Australia	Cook Islands	Fiji	French Polynesia	
Guam	Nauru	New Caledonia	New Zealand	
Papua New Guinea	Samoa	Solomon Islands	Vanuatu	Wallis and Futuna

== See also ==
- Oceania Judo Union
- Oceania Taekwondo Union
