= World Karate Federation =

International governing body of sport karate

- Sport: Karate
- Jurisdiction: Worldwide
- Membership: 201
- Abbreviation: WKF
- Founded: 10 October 1970; 56 years ago
- Affiliation: IOC
- Regional affiliation: World
- Headquarters: Madrid, Spain
- President: Antonio Espinós
- CEO: Sara Wolfferdown
- Vice president(s): Jose Garcia-Maañón, Nasser Alrazooqi, Bechir Cherif, Gunnar Nordahl, Michael Kassis, Wolfgang Weigert

Official website
- www.wkf.net

The World Karate Federation (WKF) is an international governing body of sport karate with 198 member countries. It is the only karate organization recognised by the International Olympic Committee and has more than a hundred million members. The WKF organizes their Junior and Senior Karate World Championships, which are each held every other year. WKF is recognised member of the International World Games Association (IWGA), as the governing body for karate in the World Games The President of the WKF is Antonio Espinós, and the headquarters are located in Madrid, Spain.

== History ==
Karate was introduced to Europe around the 1950s by Japanese masters, mainly from the Japan Karate Association (JKA). In 1961, Jacques Delcourt was appointed President of French Karate Federation, which was at that stage an associated member of the French Judo Federation. In 1963 he invited the six other known European federations (Italy, Great Britain, Belgium, Germany, Switzerland and Spain) to come to France for the first-ever international karate event, and Great Britain and Belgium accepted the invitation.

In December of that year, six of the seven federations gathered in Paris, in what was to be the first European Karate Congress, with the aim of improving and organising karate tournaments between their countries. It was noted that the unification of the different karate styles was impossible, and so they decided to unify the refereeing.

By 1963 the European Karate Union was created, with Jacques Delcourt voted in as President. The following year the first European Karate Championships were held, in Paris.

In 1970, the International Karate Union (IKU) was formed by Jacques Delcourt in an effort to organise karate at the world level. Upon hearing this, Ryoichi Sasakawa, President of the Federation of All Japan Karatedo Organization (FAJKO), which later changed its name to the Japan Karate Federation (JKF), travelled to France to discuss the creation of an international governing body. The IKU was quickly disbanded and a new organisation was formed between the EKU and the Japanese federation, and was called the World Union of Karate-do Organizations (WUKO).

In 1985 the World Union of Karate-do Organizations was officially recognised by the International Olympic Committee as the official board for karate.

The integration of several new organizations during the 1990s saw WUKO membership increase to 150 National Federations. Therefore, a new name that would more accurately reflect the size and scope of the organization was needed. The name of the first International organization representing sport Karate was thus changed to World Karate Federation (WKF) on December 20, 1992.

The significant growth of WKF resulted in a consolidated organisation that fully represented the sport of Karate at the international level. This legitimacy was confirmed in 1999 when the IOC officially recognised the World Karate Federation as the sole governing body for the sport of Karate in the world.

In August 2016 it was announced Karate would be in the 2020 Summer Olympics.

== Members ==
The global membership of the World Karate Federation stands at 200 national federation members, spanning five continents.

=== Continental federations ===
Continent	Name	Abbreviation	national member federations
Africa	African Karate Federation	UFAK	50
Asia	Asian Karate Federation	AKF	44
Europe	European Karate Federation	EKF	54
Americas	Panamerican Karate Federation	PKF	39
Oceania	Oceanian Karate Federation	OKF	13

=== National federations ===
Asia			
Afghanistan	Bahrain	Bangladesh	Bhutan
Brunei	Cambodia	North Korea	Timor-Leste
Hong Kong	India	Indonesia	Iraq
Iran	Japan	Jordan	Kazakhstan
Kuwait	Kyrgyzstan	Laos	Lebanon
Macau, China	Malaysia	Mongolia	Myanmar
Nepal	Oman	Pakistan	Palestine
China	Philippines	Qatar	South Korea
Saudi Arabia	Singapore	Sri Lanka	Syria
Tajikistan	Thailand	Chinese Taipei	Turkmenistan
United Arab Emirates	Uzbekistan	Vietnam	Yemen

Europe			
Albania	Andorra	Armenia	Austria
Azerbaijan	Belarus	Belgium	Bosnia and Herzegovina
Bulgaria	Croatia	Cyprus	Czech Republic
Denmark	England	Estonia	Finland
France	Georgia	Germany	Great Britain
Greece	Hungary	Iceland	Ireland
Israel	Italy	Kosovo	Latvia
Liechtenstein	Lithuania	Luxembourg	Malta
Monaco	Montenegro	Netherlands	North Macedonia
Northern Ireland	Norway	Poland	Portugal
Moldova	Romania	Russia	San Marino
Scotland	Serbia	Slovakia	Slovenia
Spain	Sweden	Switzerland	Turkey
Ukraine	Wales		

Panamerica			
Antigua and Barbuda	Argentina	Aruba	Bahamas
Barbados	Belize	Bermuda	Bolivia
Brazil	Canada	Cayman Islands	Chile
Colombia	Costa Rica	Cuba	Curaçao
Dominican Republic	Ecuador	El Salvador	Grenada
Guatemala	Guyana	Haiti	Honduras
Jamaica	Martinique	Mexico	Nicaragua
Panama	Paraguay	Peru	Puerto Rico
Saint Lucia	Saint Vincent and the Grenadines	Suriname	Trinidad and Tobago
United States	Uruguay	Venezuela	

Africa			
Algeria	Angola	Benin	Botswana
Burkina Faso	Burundi	Cameroon	Cape Verde
Central African Republic	Chad	Comoros	Congo
Democratic Republic of the Congo	Djibouti	Egypt	Equatorial Guinea
Ethiopia	Gabon	Gambia	Ghana
Guinea	Ivory Coast	Kenya	Liberia
Libya	Madagascar	Mali	Mauritania
Mauritius	Morocco	Mozambique	Namibia
Niger	Nigeria	Rwanda	Sao Tome and Principe
Senegal	Seychelles	Sierra Leone	Somalia
South Africa	South Sudan	Sudan	Swaziland
Togo	Tunisia	Uganda	Tanzania
Zambia	Zimbabwe		

Oceania			
Australia	Cook Islands	Fiji	French Polynesia
Guam	Nauru	New Caledonia	New Zealand
Papua New Guinea	Samoa	Solomon Islands	Vanuatu
Wallis and Futuna			

== Competition and events ==
=== Kumite ===
- Individual kumite - Men's -60 kg, -67 kg, -75 kg, -84 kg and +84 kg Weight
- Individual kumite - Women's -50 kg, -55 kg, -61 kg, -68 kg and +68 kg Weight
- Team kumite - Men and Women

=== Kata ===
- Individual kata - Men and Women
- Team kata (synchronized) - Men and Women

team kata with bunkai

=== Para-Karate ===
- Athletes with Visual Impairments - Men and Women
- Athletes with Intellectual Impairments - Men and Women
- Wheelchair User - Men and Women

Rules:

=== Guardian Girls Karate ===
Guardian Girls Karate (GGK) is a global project originally developed by the Koyamada International Foundation (KIF) and later transferred to Guardian Girls International. Launched in partnership with the WKF and UNFPA in October 2022 in Los Angeles, the project has been licensed to WKF since 2024 and is administered exclusively by the WKF and implemented locally through WKF’s authorized national federation members worldwide, in collaboration with GGI and KIF’s national chapters.
