= Karate =

Japanese and Okinawan martial art

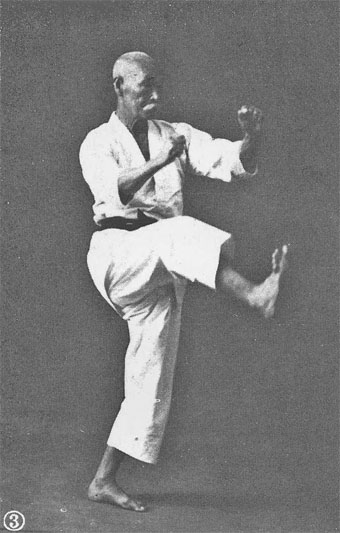
- Chōmo Hanashiro, an Okinawan karate master c. 1938
- Also known as: Karate-do (空手道)
- Focus: Striking
- Hardness: Full-contact, semi-contact, light-contact
- Country of origin: Ryukyu Kingdom (Present day Okinawa prefecture, Japan)
- Date of formation: c. 15th century
- Parenthood: Indigenous martial arts of Ryukyu Islands, Chinese martial arts

Karate
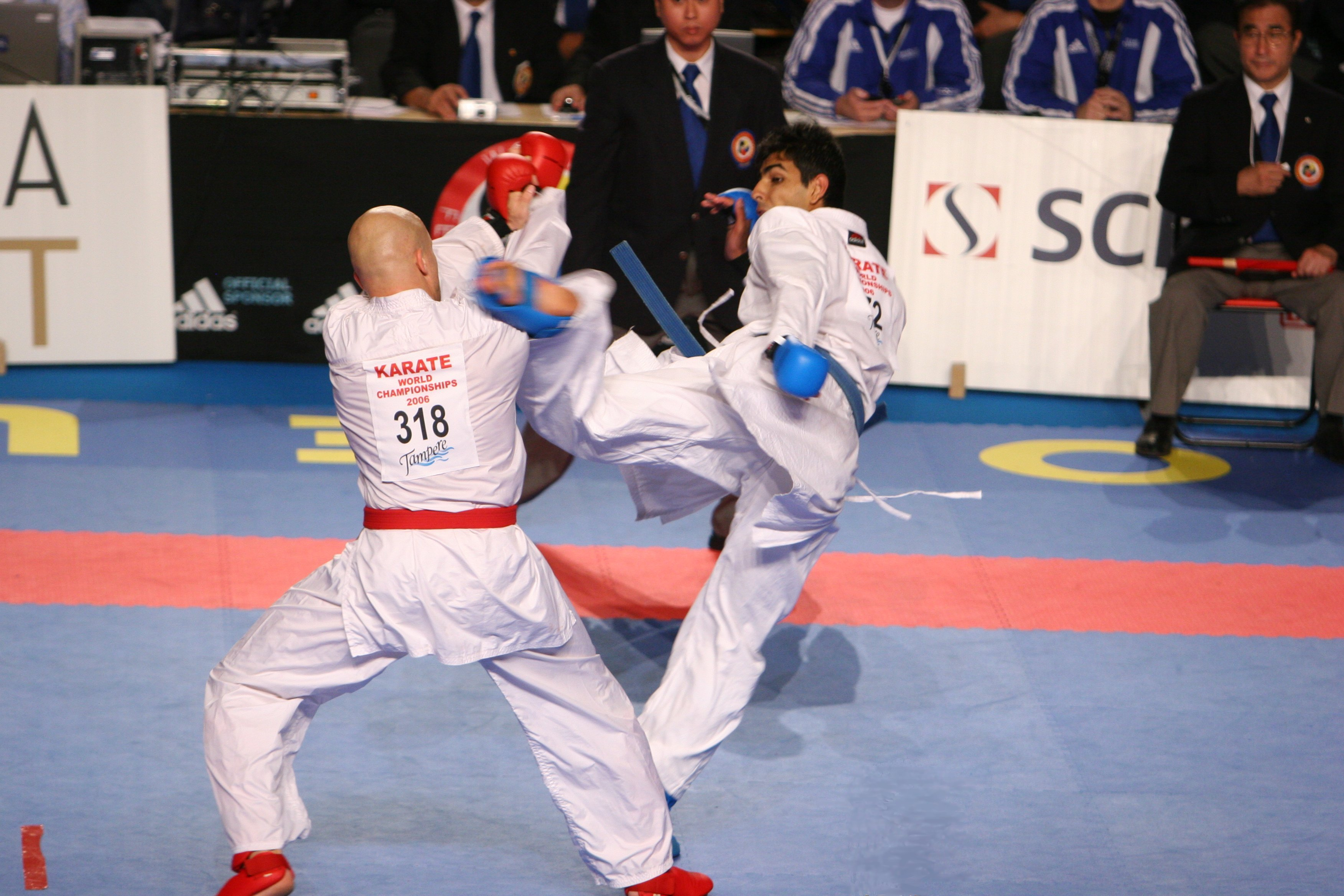
- WKF's Karate World Championship 2006 in Tampere, Finland; men's heavyweight final
- Highest governing body: World Karate Federation
- First developed: 1950s

Characteristics
- Contact: Yes
- Mixed-sex: Varies
- Type: Martial art

Presence
- Country or region: Worldwide
- Olympic: 2020
- World Games: 1981 – present

Karate (空手) (/kəˈrɑːti/; Japanese pronunciation: [kaɾate]; Okinawan pronunciation: [kaɾati]), also karate-do (空手道, Karate-dō), is a martial art developed in the Ryukyu Kingdom. It developed from the indigenous Ryukyuan martial arts (called te (手), "hand"; tī in Okinawan) under the influence of Chinese martial arts. While modern karate is primarily a striking art that uses punches and kicks, traditional karate training also employs throwing and joint locking techniques. A karate practitioner is called a karateka or karate-ka (空手家).

Beginning in the 1300s, early Chinese martial artists brought their techniques to Okinawa. Despite the Ryukyu Kingdom being turned into a puppet state by Japanese samurai in 1609, after the Invasion of Ryukyu, its cultural ties to China remained strong. Since Ryukyuans were banned from carrying swords under samurai rule, groups of young aristocrats created unarmed combat methods as a form of resistance, combining Chinese and local styles of martial arts. Training emphasized self-discipline. This blend of martial arts became known as kara-te 唐手, which translates to "Chinese hand." Initially, there were no uniforms, colored belts, ranking systems, or standardized styles. Many elements essential to modern karate were actually incorporated a century ago.

The Ryukyu Kingdom had been conquered by the Japanese Satsuma Domain and had become its vassal state in 1609, but was formally annexed to the Empire of Japan in 1879 as Okinawa Prefecture. The Ryukyuan samurai (Okinawan: samurē) who had been the bearers of karate lost their privileged position, and with it, karate was in danger of losing transmission. However, karate gradually regained popularity after 1905, when it began to be taught in schools in Okinawa. During the Taishō era (1912–1926), karate was initially introduced to mainland Japan by Ankō Itosu and then by his students Gichin Funakoshi and Motobu Chōki. The ultranationalistic sentiment of the 1930s affected every aspect of Japanese culture. To make the imported martial art more relatable, Funakoshi incorporated elements from judo, such as the training uniforms, colored belts, and ranking systems. Karate's popularity was initially sluggish with little exposition but when a magazine reported a story about Motobu defeating a foreign boxer in Kyoto, karate rapidly became well known throughout Japan.

In this era of escalating Japanese militarism, the name was changed from 唐手 ("Chinese hand" or "Tang hand") to 空手 ("empty hand") – both of which are pronounced karate in Japanese – to indicate that the Japanese wished to develop the combat form in Japanese style. After World War II, Okinawa became (1945) an important United States military site and karate became popular among servicemen stationed there. The martial arts movies of the 1960s and 1970s served to greatly increase the popularity of martial arts around the world, and English-speakers began to use the word karate in a generic way to refer to all striking-based Asian martial arts. Karate schools (dōjōs) began appearing around the world, catering to those with casual interest as well as those seeking a deeper study of the art.

Karate-do, like most Japanese martial arts, is considered to be not only about fighting techniques, but also about spiritual cultivation. Many karate schools and dōjōs have established rules called dōjō kun, which emphasize the perfection of character, the importance of effort, and respect for courtesy. Karate featured at the 2020 Summer Olympics after its inclusion at the Games was supported by the International Olympic Committee. Web Japan (sponsored by the Japanese Ministry of Foreign Affairs) claims that karate has 50 million practitioners worldwide, while the World Karate Federation claims there are 100 million practitioners around the world.

== Etymology ==
Originally in Okinawa during the Ryukyu Kingdom period, there existed an indigenous Ryukyuan martial art called te (Okinawan:tī, lit. 'hand'). Furthermore, in the 19th century, a Chinese-derived martial art called tōde (Okinawan: tōdī, lit. 'Tang hand') emerged. According to Gichin Funakoshi, a distinction between Okinawa-te and tōde existed in the late 19th century. With the emergence of tōde, it is thought that te also came to be called Okinawa-te (Okinawan: Uchinādī, lit. 'Okinawa hand'). However, this distinction gradually became blurred with the decline of Okinawa-te.

Around 1905, when karate began to be taught in public schools in Okinawa, tōde was read kun'yomi and called karate (唐手, lit. 'Tang hand') in the Japanese style. Both tōde and karate are written in the same kanji meaning "Tang/China hand," but the former is on'yomi (Chinese reading) and the latter is kun'yomi (Japanese reading). Since the distinction between Okinawa-te and tōde was already blurred at that time, karate was used to encompass both. Kara (から) is a kun'yomi for the character 唐, read as tō (とう) in on'yomi. Read aloud in kun'yomi, kara also refers to the Korean state Kaya (加羅) and later included things deriving from China (specifically from the Tang dynasty). Therefore, tōde and karate (Tang hand) differ in the scope of meaning of the words.

Japan sent envoys to the Tang dynasty and introduced much Chinese culture. Gichin Funakoshi proposed that tōde/karate may have been used instead of te, as Tang became a synonym for luxury imported goods.

According to Gichin Funakoshi, the word pronounced karate (から手) existed in the Ryukyu Kingdom period, but it is unclear whether it meant Tang hand (唐手) or empty hand (空手).

The Chinese origins of karate were increasingly viewed with suspicion due to rising tensions between China and Japan and as well as the looming threat of a full-scale war between the two countries. In 1933, the Japanese character for karate was altered to a homophone— a word pronounced identically but with a different meaning. Thus, "Chinese hand" was replaced with "empty hand."

But this name change did not immediately spread among Okinawan karate practitioners. There were many karate practitioners, such as Chōjun Miyagi, who still used te in everyday conversation until World War II.

When karate was first taught in mainland Japan in the 1920s, Gichin Funakoshi and Motobu Chōki used the name karate-jutsu (唐手術, lit. 'Tang hand art') along with karate. The word jutsu (術) means art or technique, and in those days it was often used as a suffix to the name of each martial art, as in jujutsu and kenjutsu (swordsmanship).

The first documented use of a homophone of the logogram pronounced kara by replacing the Chinese character meaning "Tang dynasty" with the character meaning "empty" took place in Karate Kumite (空手組手) written in August 1905 by Chōmo Hanashiro (1869–1945). In mainland Japan, karate (空手, empty hand) gradually began to be used from the writings of Gichin Funakoshi and Motobu Chōki in the 1920s.

In 1929 the Karate Study Group of Keio University (Instructor Gichin Funakoshi) used this term in reference to the concept of emptiness in the Heart Sutra, and this terminology was later popularized, especially in Tokyo. There is also a theory that the background for this name change was the worsening of Japan-China relations at the time.

On 25 October 1936 a roundtable meeting of karate masters was held in Naha, Okinawa Prefecture, and it was officially resolved to use the name karate (empty hand) in the sense of kūshu kūken (空手空拳, lit. 'without anything in the hands or fists'). To commemorate this day, the Okinawa Prefectural Assembly passed a resolution in 2005 to decide 25 October as "Karate Day."

Another nominal development is the addition of dō (道; どう) to the end of the word karate. Dō is a suffix having numerous meanings including road, path, route and way. It is used in many martial arts that survived Japan's transition from feudal culture to modern times. It implies that these arts are not just fighting systems but contain spiritual elements when promoted as disciplines. In this context dō is usually translated as "the way of …". Examples include aikido, judo, kyūdō and kendo. Thus karatedō is more than just empty hand techniques. It is "the way of the empty hand".

Since the 1980s the term karate (カラテ) has been written in katakana instead of Chinese characters, mainly by Kyokushin Karate (founder: Masutatsu Oyama). In Japan, katakana is mainly used for foreign words, giving Kyokushin Karate a modern and new impression.

Name Transition
15th – 18th century	19th century	1900s –	1920s –		1980s –
Te (hand)	Te or Okinawa-te	Karate (Tang hand)	Karate(-jutsu)	Karate (Empty hand)	Karate (カラテ)
Te (hand)	Tōde (Tang hand)	Karate (Tang hand)		Karate (Empty hand)	

== History ==
=== Origin ===
There are several theories regarding the origins of karate, but the main ones are as follows.

==== Theory of development from mēkata ====
In Okinawa there was an ancient martial dance called mēkata (舞方). The dancers danced to the accompaniment of songs and sanshin music, similar to karate kata. In the Okinawan countryside, mēkata remained until the early 20th century. There is a theory that from this mēkata with martial elements, te (Okinawan:tī, hand) was born and developed into karate. This theory is advocated by Ankō Asato and his student Gichin Funakoshi.

==== Theory of introduction by thirty-six families from Min ====
It is said that, in 1392, a group of professional people known as the "Thirty-six families from Min" migrated to Kume Village (now Kume, Naha City) in Naha from Fujian Province in the Ming Dynasty at that time. They brought with them advanced learning and skills to Ryukyu, and there is a theory that Chinese kenpō, the origin of karate, was also brought to Ryukyu at this time.

There is also the "Keichō import theory," which states that karate was brought to Ryukyu after the invasion of Ryukyu by the Satsuma Domain (Keichō 14, 1609), as well as the theory that it was introduced by Kōshōkun (Okinawan: Kūsankū) based on the description in Ōshima Writing.

==== Other theories ====
There are also other theories, such as that it developed from Okinawan sumo (shima) or that it originated from jujutsu, which had been introduced from Japan.It has been speculated that te did not originate from mēkata, but instead emerged out of warfare during the Sanzan period.

=== Okinawa ===
==== 15th–17th centuries ====
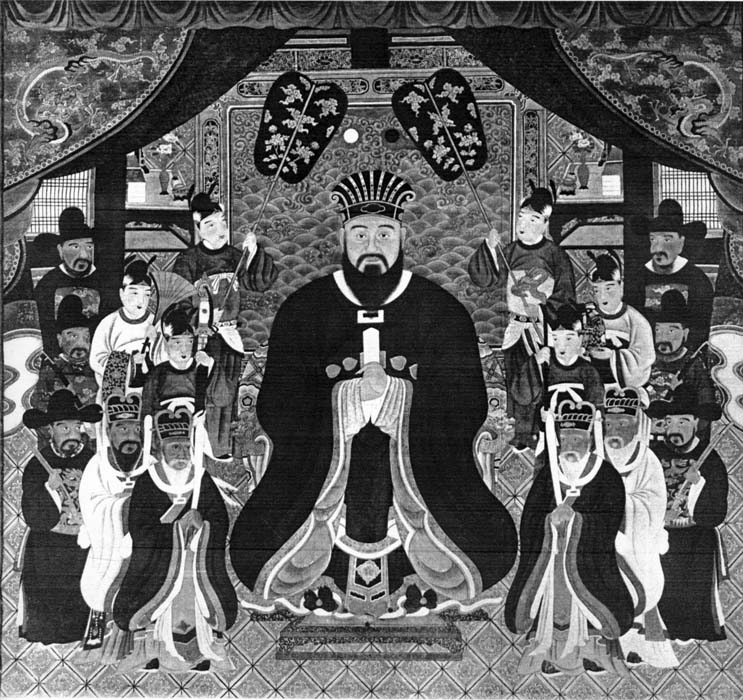
King Shō Shin

The reason for the development of unarmed combat techniques in Ryukyu has conventionally been attributed to a policy of banning weapons, which is said to have been implemented on two occasions. The first was during the reign of King Shō Shin (1476–1526; r. 1477–1527), when weapons were collected from all over the country and strictly controlled by the royal government. The second time was after the invasion of Ryukyu by the Satsuma Domain in 1609. Through the two policies, the popular belief that Ryukyuan samurai, who were deprived of their weapons, developed karate to compete with Satsuma's samurai has traditionally been referred to as if it were a historical fact.

But in recent years many researchers have questioned the causal relationship between the policy of banning weapons and the development of karate. For example, as the basis for King Shō Shin's policy of banning weapons, an inscription on the parapet of the main hall of Shuri Castle (百浦添欄干之銘, 1509), which states that "swords, bows and arrows are to be piled up exclusively as weapons of national defense," has been conventionally interpreted as meaning "weapons were collected and sealed in a warehouse." However, in recent years, researchers of Okinawan studies have pointed out that the correct interpretation is that "swords, bows and arrows were collected and used as weapons of the state."

It is also known that the policy of banning weapons (a 1613 notice to the Ryukyu royal government), which is said to have been implemented by the Satsuma Domain, only prohibited the carrying of swords and other weapons, but not their possession, and was a relatively lax regulation. This notice stated, "(1) The possession of guns is prohibited. (2) The possession of weapons owned privately by princes, three magistrates, and samurai is permitted. (3) Weapons must be repaired in Satsuma through the magistrate's office of Satsuma. (4) Swords must be reported to the magistrate's office of Satsuma for approval." It did not prohibit the possession of weapons (except guns) or even their practice. In fact, even after subjugation to the Satsuma Domain, a number of Ryukyuan masters of swordsmanship, spearmanship, archery, and other arts are known. Therefore, some researchers criticize the theory that karate developed due to the policy of banning weapons as "a rumor on the street with no basis at all."

Karate began as a common fighting system known as te (Okinawan: tī) among the Ryukyuan samurai class. There were few formal styles of te, but rather many practitioners with their own methods. One surviving example is Motobu Udundī (lit. 'Motobu Palace Hand'), which has been handed down to this day in the Motobu family, one of the branches of the former Ryukyu royal family. In the 16th century, the Ryukyuan history book "Kyūyō" (球陽, established around 1745) mentions that Kyō Ahagon Jikki, a favored retainer of King Shō Shin, used a martial art called "karate" (空手, lit. 'empty hand') to smash both legs of an assassin. This karate is thought to refer to te, not today's karate, and Ankō Asato introduces Kyō Ahagon as a "prominent martial artist."

==== 18th century ====
However, some believe that Kyō Ahagon's anecdote is a half-legend and that it is unclear whether he was actually a te master. In the 18th century, the names of Nishinda Uēkata, Gushikawa Uēkata, and Chōken Makabe are known as masters of te.

Nishinda Uēkata and Gushikawa Uēkata were martial artists active during the reign of King Shō Kei (reigned 1713–1751). Nishinda Uēkata was good at spear as well as te, and Gushikawa Uēkata was also good at wooden sword (swordsmanship).

Chōken Makabe was a man of the late 18th century. His light stature and jumping ability gave him the nickname "Makabe Chān-gwā" (lit. 'little fighting cock'), as he was like a chān (fighting cock). The ceiling of his house is said to have been marked by his kicking foot.

It is known that in "Ōshima Writing" (1762), written by Yoshihiro Tobe, a Confucian scholar of the Tosa Domain, who interviewed Ryukyuan samurai who had drifted to Tosa (present-day Kōchi Prefecture), there is a description of a martial art called kumiai-jutsu (組合術) performed by Kōshōkun (Okinawan:Kūsankū). It is believed that Kōshōkun may have been a military officer on a mission from Qing that visited Ryukyu in 1756, and some believe that karate originated with Kōshōkun.

In addition, the will (Part I: 1778, Part II: 1783) of Ryukyuan samurai Aka Pēchin Chokushki (1721–1784) mentions the name of a martial art called karamutō (からむとう), along with Japanese Jigen-ryū swordsmanship and jujutsu, indicating that Ryukyuan samurai practiced these arts in the 18th century.

In 1609, the Japanese Satsuma Domain invaded Ryukyu and Ryukyu became its vassal state, but it continued to pay tribute to the Ming and Qing Dynasties in China. At the time, China had implemented a policy of sea ban and only traded with tributary countries, so the Satsuma Domain wanted Ryukyu to continue its tribute to benefit from it.

The envoys of the tribute mission were chosen from among the samurai class of Ryukyu, and they went to Fuzhou in Fujian and stayed there for six months to a year and a half. Government-funded and privately funded foreign students were also sent to study in Beijing or Fuzhou for several years. Some of these envoys and students studied Chinese martial arts in China. The styles of Chinese martial arts they studied are not known for certain, but it is assumed that they studied Fujian White Crane and other styles from Fujian Province.

Sōryo Tsūshin (monk Tsūshin), active during the reign of King Shō Kei, was a monk who went to the Qing Dynasty to study Chinese martial arts and was reportedly one of the best martial artists of his time in Ryukyu.

==== 19th and early 20th century ====
It is not known when the name tōde (唐手, lit. 'Tang hand') first came into use in the Ryukyu Kingdom, but according to Ankō Asato, it was popularized from Kanga Sakugawa (1786–1867), who was nicknamed "Tōde Sakugawa." Sakugawa was a samurai from Shuri who traveled to Qing China to learn Chinese martial arts. The martial arts he mastered were new and different from te. As tōde was spread by Sakugawa, traditional te became distinguished as Okinawa-te (沖縄手, lit. 'Okinawa hand'), and gradually faded away as it merged with tōde.

It is generally believed that today's karate is a result of the synthesis of te (Okinawa-te) and tōde. Funakoshi writes, "In the early modern era, when China was highly revered, many martial artists traveled to China to practice Chinese kenpo, and added it to the ancient kenpo, the so-called 'Okinawa-te'. After further study, they discarded the disadvantages of both, adopted their advantages, and added more subtlety, and karate was born."

Early styles of karate are often generalized as Shuri-te, Naha-te, and Tomari-te, named after the three cities from which they emerged. Each area and its teachers had particular kata, techniques, and principles that distinguished their local version of te from the others.

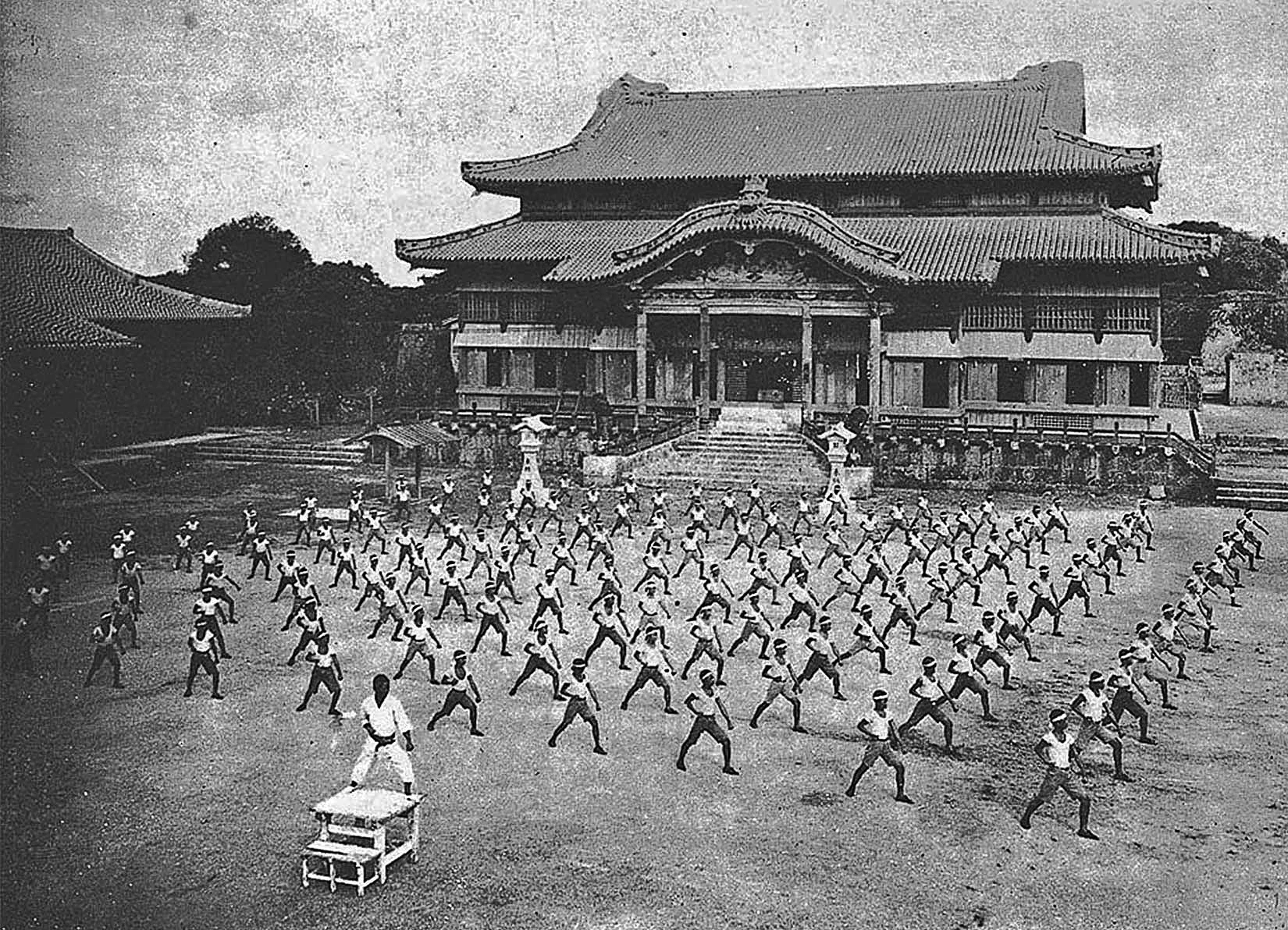
Karate training in front of Shuri Castle in Naha (1938)

Around the 1820s, Matsumura Sōkon (1809–1899) began teaching Okinawa-te. Matsumura was, according to one theory, a student of Sakugawa. Matsumura's style later became the origin of many Shuri-te schools.

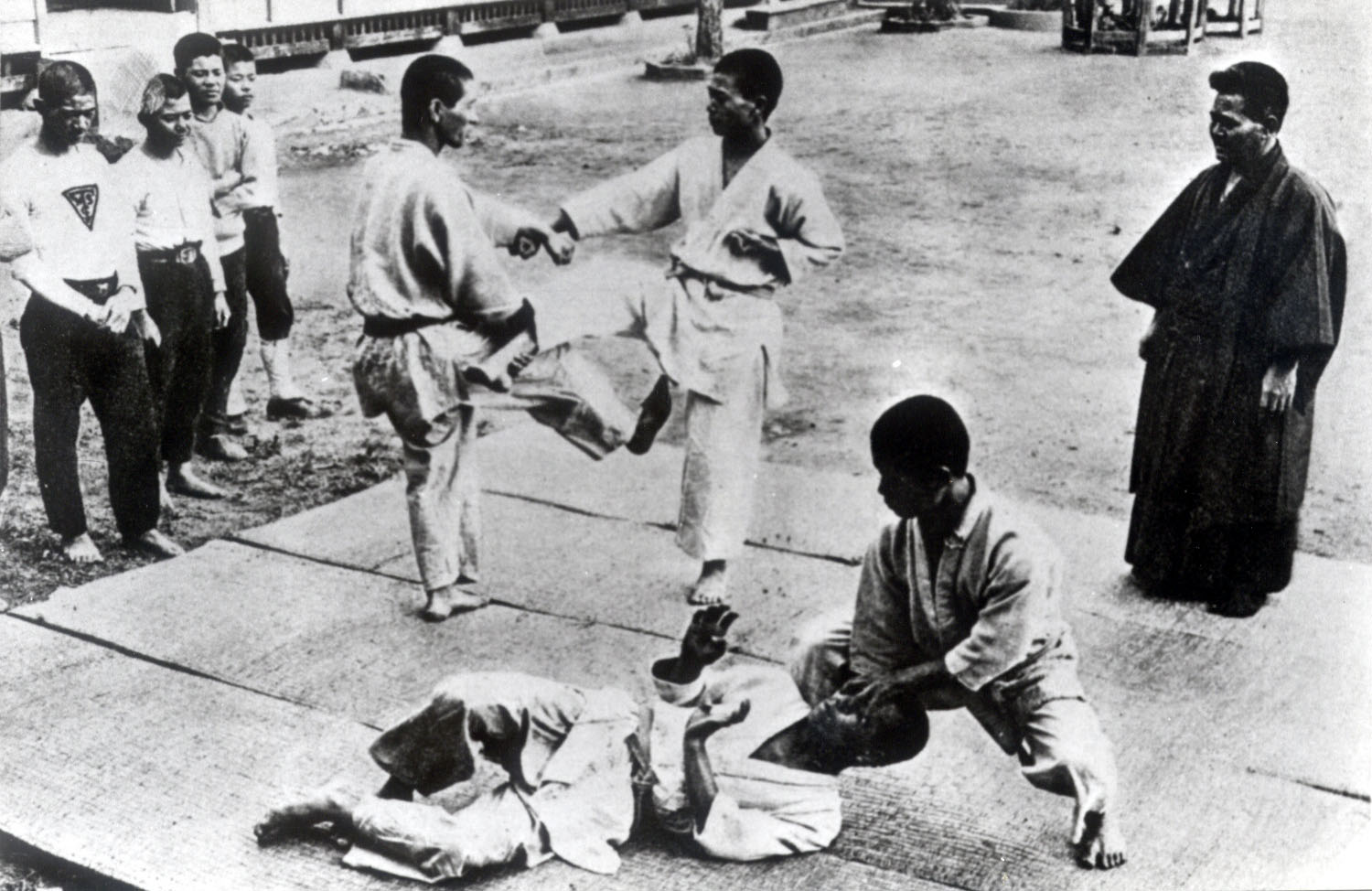
Karate in Naha before the war (before 1946)

In 1881, Higaonna Kanryō returned from China after years of instruction with Ryu Ryu Ko and founded what would become Naha-te. One of his students was the founder of Gojū-ryū, Chōjun Miyagi. Chōjun Miyagi taught such well-known karateka as Seko Higa (who also trained with Higaonna), Meitoku Yagi, Miyazato Ei'ichi, and Seikichi Toguchi, and for a very brief time near the end of his life, An'ichi Miyagi (a teacher claimed by Morio Higaonna).

Itosu Ankō (1831–1915) studied under Naha-te under Matsumura and Bushi Nagahama. He created the Pin'an forms ("Heian" in Japanese) which are simplified kata for beginning students. In 1905, Itosu helped to get karate introduced into Okinawa's public schools. These forms were taught to children at the elementary school level. Itosu's influence in karate is broad. The forms he created are common across nearly all styles of karate. His students became some of the most well-known karate masters, including Motobu Chōyū, Motobu Chōki, Yabu Kentsū, Hanashiro Chōmo, Gichin Funakoshi and Kenwa Mabuni. Itosu is sometimes referred to as "the Grandfather of Modern Karate."

In addition to the three early te styles of karate a fourth Okinawan influence is that of Uechi Kanbun (1877–1948). At the age of 20 he went to Fuzhou in Fujian Province, China, to escape Japanese military conscription. While there he studied under Shū Shiwa (Chinese: Zhou Zihe 周子和 1874–1926). He was a leading figure of Chinese Nanpa Shorin-ken style at that time. He later developed his own style of Uechi-ryū karate based on the Sanchin, Seisan, and Sanseiryu kata that he had studied in China.

=== Japan ===
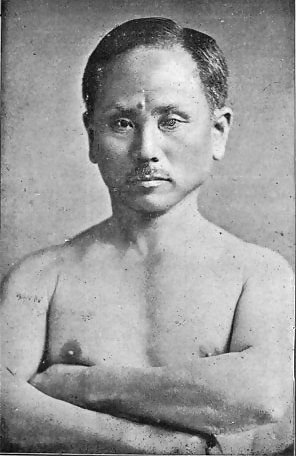
Gichin Funakoshi

When Shō Tai, the last king of the Ryūkyū Kingdom, was ordered to move to Tokyo in 1879, he was accompanied by prominent karate masters such as Ankō Asato and Chōfu Kyan (father of Chōtoku Kyan). It is unknown if they taught karate to the Japanese in Tokyo, although there are records that Kyan taught his son karate.

In 1908, students from the Okinawa Prefectural Middle School gave a karate demonstration at Butokuden in Kyoto, which was also witnessed by Kanō Jigorō (founder of judo).

In May 1922, Gichin Funakoshi (founder of Shotokan) presented pictures of karate on two hanging scrolls at the first Physical Education Exhibition in Tokyo. The following June, Funakoshi was invited to the Kodokan to give a karate demonstration in front of Jigoro Kano and other judo experts. This was the beginning of the full-scale introduction of karate in Tokyo.

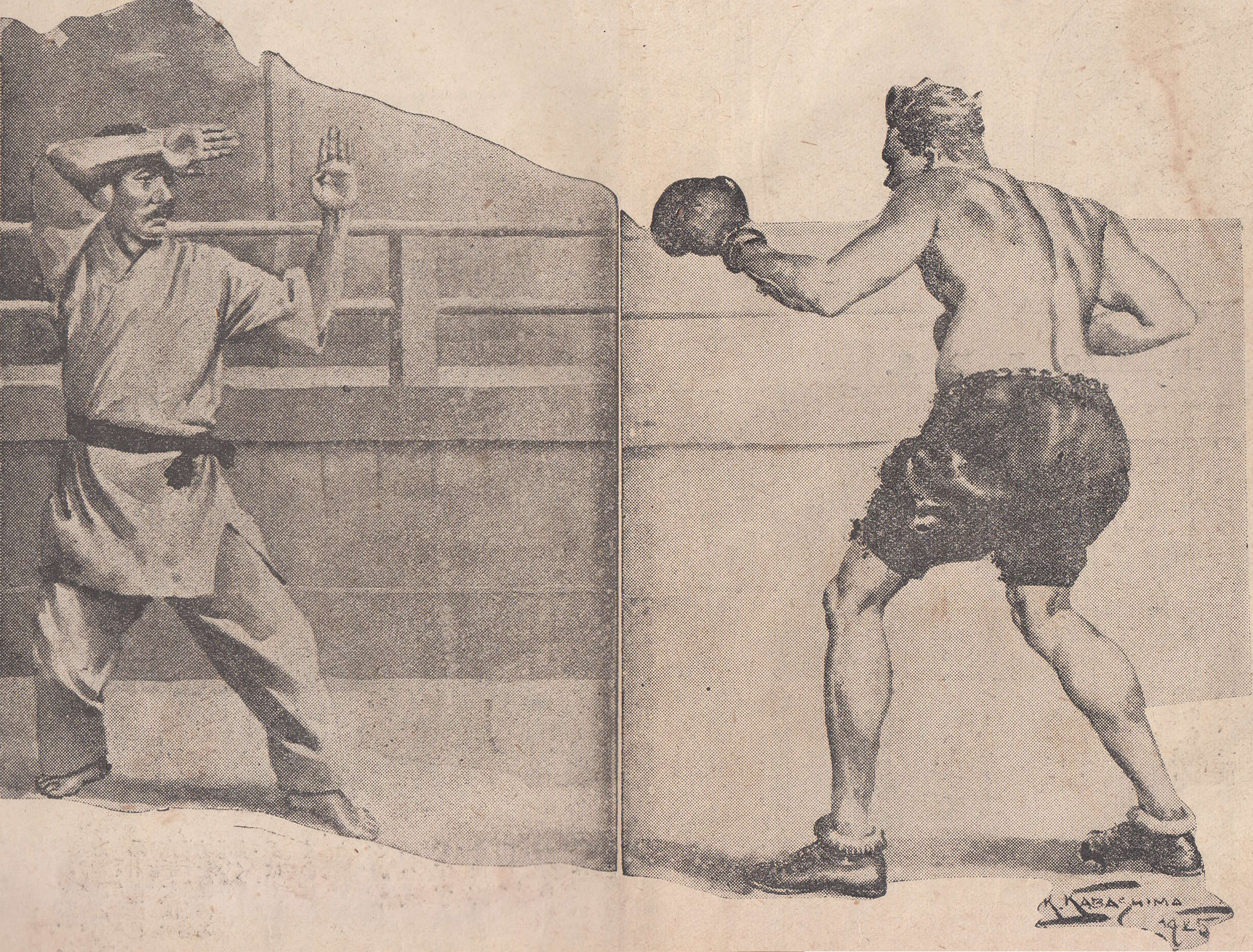
Illustration depicting a match between Motobu Chōki and a foreign boxer

In November 1922, Motobu Chōki (founder of Motobu-ryū) participated in a judo versus boxing match in Kyoto, defeating a foreign boxer. The match was featured in Japan's largest magazine "King," which had a circulation of about one million at the time, and karate and Motobu's name became instantly known throughout Japan.

In 1922, Funakoshi published the first book on karate, and in 1926 Motobu published the first technical book on kumite (sparring). As karate's popularity grew, karate clubs were established one after another in Japanese universities with Funakoshi and Motobu as instructors.

In the Showa era (1926–1989), other Okinawan karate masters also came to mainland Japan to teach karate. These included Kenwa Mabuni, Chōjun Miyagi, Kanken Tōyama, and Kanbun Uechi.

With the rise of militarism in Japan, some karate masters gradually came to consider the name karate (唐手, lit. 'Tang hand') undesirable. The name karate (空手, lit. 'empty hand') had already been used by Chōmo Hanashiro in Okinawa in 1905, and Funakoshi decided to use this name as well. In addition, the name karatedō (唐手道, lit. 'the way of the Tang hand'), which was already used by the karate club of Tokyo Imperial University (now the University of Tokyo) in 1929 by adding the suffix dō (道, way) to karate, was also used by Funakoshi, who decided to use the name karatedō (空手道, lit. 'the way of the empty hand') in the same way.

The dō suffix implies that karatedō is a path to self-knowledge, not just a study of the technical aspects of fighting. Like most martial arts practised in Japan, karate made its transition from -jutsu to -dō around the beginning of the 20th century. The "dō" in "karate-dō" sets it apart from karate-jutsu, as aikido is distinguished from aikijutsu, judo from jujutsu, kendo from kenjutsu and iaido from iaijutsu.

In 1933, karate was officially recognized as a Japanese martial art by the Dai Nippon Butoku Kai, but initially belonged to the jujutsu division and title examinations were conducted by jujutsu masters.

By 1935 Funakoshi had changed the names of many kata and karate itself. Funakoshi's motivation was that the names of many of the traditional kata were unintelligible, and that it would be inappropriate to use the Chinese style names to teach karate as a Japanese martial art. He also said that the kata had to be simplified to spread karate as a form of physical education, so some of the kata were modified. He always referred to what he taught as simply karate, but in 1936 he built a dōjō in Tokyo and the style he left behind is usually called Shotokan after this dōjō. Shoto, meaning "pine wave", was Funakoshi's pen name and kan meaning "hall".

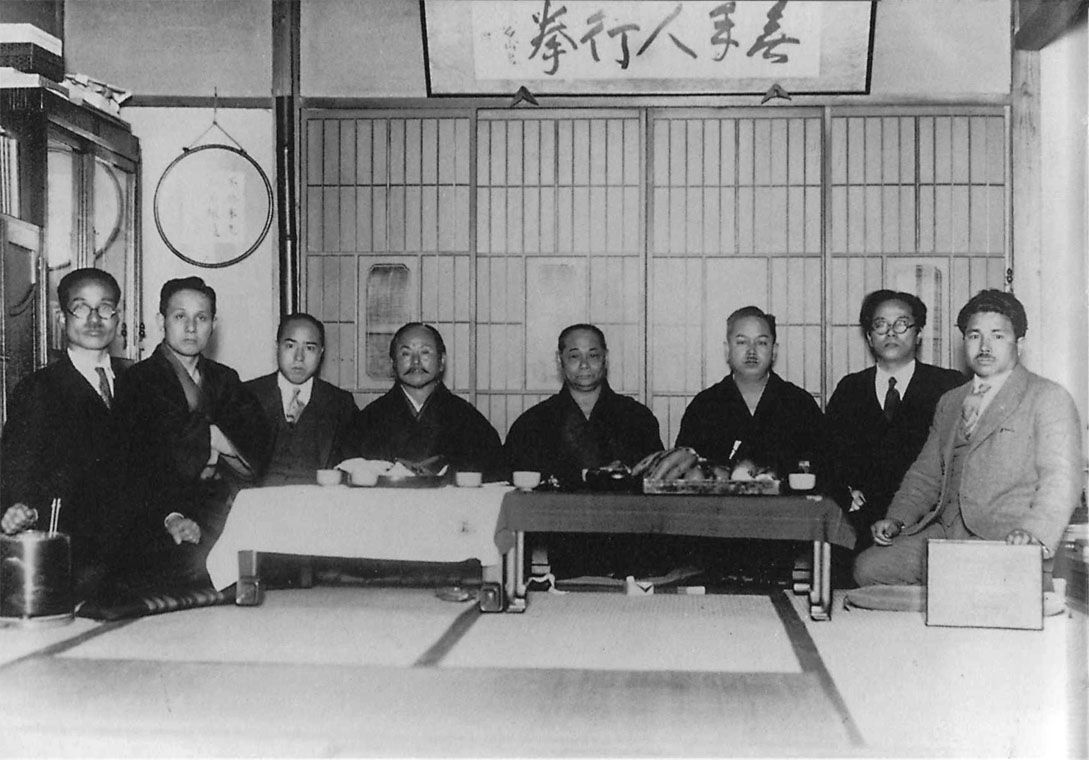
Masters of karate in Tokyo (c. 1930s), from left to right, Kanken Toyama, Hironori Otsuka, Takeshi Shimoda, Gichin Funakoshi, Chōki Motobu, Kenwa Mabuni, Genwa Nakasone, and Shinken Taira

On 25 October 1936, a roundtable meeting of karate masters was held in Naha, Okinawa Prefecture, where it was officially decided to change the name of karate from karate (Tang hand) to karate (empty hand). In attendance were Chōmo Hanashiro, Chōki Motobu, Chōtoku Kyan, Jūhatsu Kyoda, Chōjun Miyagi, Shinpan Gusukuma, and Chōshin Chibana. In 2005, the Okinawa Prefectural Assembly passed a resolution to commemorate this decision by designating 25 October as "Karate Day."

The modernization and systemization of karate in Japan also included the adoption of the white uniform that consisted of the dogi or keikogi—mostly called just karategi—and coloured belt ranks. Both of these innovations were originated and popularized by Jigoro Kano, the founder of judo and one of the men Funakoshi consulted in his efforts to modernize karate.

At that time, there was almost no kumite training in karate, and kata training was the main focus. There were also no matches. However, at that time, judo and kendo matches were already being held in mainland Japan, and randori (乱取り; lit. 'free-style practice') practice was also being actively practiced, the young people in mainland Japan gradually became dissatisfied with kata-only practice.

In pre–World War II Okinawa, karateka practiced iri kumi (Okinawan for kumite) allowing all kinds of techniques (strikes, choke holds, joint locks, etc.) but in a controlled manner to not injure the opponent when aiming to vital areas. Despite sparring originally being an unnoticed form of practice for senior students, there were no "contests" until Western-style competitions were introduced to Japan.

Gichin Funakoshi stated, "There are no contests in karate." Shigeru Egami relates that, during his visit to Okinawa in 1940, he heard some karateka were ousted from their dōjō because they adopted sparring after having learned it in Tokyo. In the early 1930s, pre-arranged sparring was introduced and developed, and finally a few years later free sparring was permitted for Shotokan students.

According to Yasuhiro Konishi, kata-only training was often criticized by the leading judo practitioners of the time, such as Shuichi Nagaoka and Hajime Isogai, who said, "The karate you do cannot be understood from kata alone, so why don't you try a little more so that the general public can understand it?" Against the backdrop of these complaints and criticisms, young people such as Hironori Ōtsuka and Konishi devised their own kumite and kumite matches, which are the prototypes of today's kumite. Motobu's emphasis on kumite attracted Ōtsuka and Konishi, who later studied Okinawan kumite under him.

After World War II, karate activities were temporarily stalled due to the "Notice Banning Judo, Kendo, and Other Martial Arts" issued by the Ministry of Education under the directive of the Supreme Commander for the Allied Powers. However, because this notice did not include the word "karate," it was interpreted by the Ministry of Education that karate was not prohibited, and karate was able to resume its activities earlier than other martial arts.

A new form of karate called Kyokushin was formally founded in 1957 by Masutatsu Oyama (who was born a Korean, Choi Yeong-Eui 최영의). Kyokushin is largely a synthesis of Shotokan and Gōjū-ryū. It teaches a curriculum that emphasizes aliveness, physical toughness, and full contact sparring. Because of its emphasis on physical, full-force sparring, Kyokushin is now often called "full contact karate", or "Knockdown karate" (after the name for its competition rules). Many other karate organizations and styles are descended from the Kyokushin curriculum.

== Practice ==
Karate can be practiced as an art (budō), self defense or as a combat sport. Traditional karate places emphasis on self-development (budō). Modern Japanese style training emphasizes the psychological elements incorporated into a proper kokoro (attitude) such as perseverance, fearlessness, virtue, and leadership skills. Sport karate places emphasis on exercise and competition. Weapons are an important training activity in some styles of karate.

Karate training is commonly divided into kihon (basics or fundamentals), kata (forms), and kumite (sparring).

=== Kihon ===
Kihon means basics and these form the base for everything else in the style including stances, strikes, punches, kicks and blocks. Karate styles place varying importance on kihon. Typically this is training in unison of a technique or a combination of techniques by a group of karateka. Kihon may also be prearranged drills in smaller groups or in pairs.

=== Kata ===
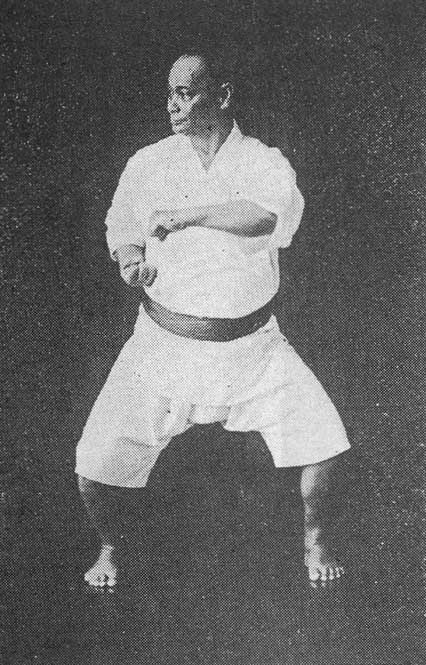
Chōki Motobu in Naihanchi-dachi, one of the basic karate stances

Kata (型:かた) means literally "shape" or "model." Kata is a formalized sequence of movements which represent various offensive and defensive postures. These postures are based on idealized combat applications. The applications when applied in a demonstration with real opponents is referred to as a Bunkai. The Bunkai shows how every stance and movement is used. Bunkai is a useful tool to understand a kata.

To attain a formal rank the karateka must demonstrate competent performance of specific required kata for that level. The Japanese terminology for grades or ranks is commonly used. Requirements for examinations vary among schools.

=== Kumite ===
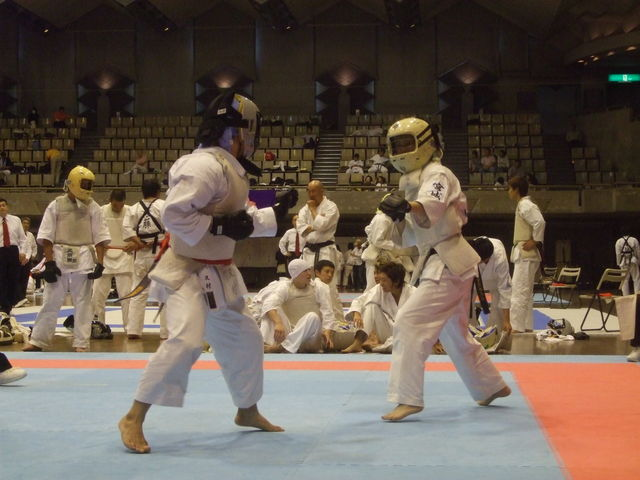
Bōgutsuki, a form of full-contact karate fought with armour, one of the competition formats for kumite

Sparring in Karate is called kumite (組手:くみて). It literally means "meeting of hands." Kumite is practiced both as a sport and as self-defense training. Levels of physical contact during sparring vary considerably. Full contact karate has several variants. Knockdown karate (such as Kyokushin) uses full power techniques to bring an opponent to the ground. Sparring in armour, bogu kumite, allows full power techniques with some safety. Sport kumite in many international competition under the World Karate Federation is free or structured with light contact or semi contact and points are awarded by a referee.

In structured kumite (yakusoku, prearranged), two participants perform a choreographed series of techniques with one striking while the other blocks. The form ends with one devastating technique (hito tsuki).

In free sparring (Jiyu Kumite), the two participants have a free choice of scoring techniques. The allowed techniques and contact level are primarily determined by sport or style organization policy, but might be modified according to the age, rank and sex of the participants. Depending upon style, take-downs, sweeps and in some rare cases even time-limited grappling on the ground are also allowed.

Competition sparring (Shiai Kumite) is performed in a marked or closed area. The bout runs for a fixed time (2 to 3 minutes.) The time can run continuously (iri kume) or be stopped for referee judgment. In light contact or semi contact kumite, points are awarded based on the criteria: good form, sporting attitude, vigorous application, awareness/zanshin, good timing and correct distance. In full contact karate kumite, points are based on the results of the impact, rather than the formal appearance of the scoring technique.

=== Dōjō Kun ===
In the bushidō tradition dōjō kun is a set of guidelines for karateka to follow. These guidelines apply both in the dōjō (training hall) and in everyday life.

=== Conditioning ===
Okinawan karate uses supplementary training known as hojo undo. This uses simple equipment made of wood and stone. The makiwara is a striking post. The nigiri game is a large jar used for developing grip strength. These supplementary exercises are designed to increase strength, stamina, speed, and muscle coordination. Sport Karate emphasizes aerobic exercise, anaerobic exercise, power, agility, flexibility, and stress management. All practices vary depending upon the school and the teacher.

== Sport ==
Karate is divided into style organizations. These organizations sometimes cooperate in non-style specific sport karate organizations or federations. Examples of sport organizations include AAKF/ITKF, AOK, TKL, AKA, WKF, NWUKO, WUKF and WKC. Organizations hold competitions (tournaments) from local to international level. Tournaments are designed to match members of opposing schools or styles against one another in kata, sparring and weapons demonstration. They are often separated by age, rank and sex with potentially different rules or standards based on these factors. The tournament may be exclusively for members of a particular style (closed) or one in which any martial artist from any style may participate within the rules of the tournament (open).

The World Karate Federation (WKF) is the largest sport karate organization and is recognized by the International Olympic Committee (IOC) as being responsible for karate competition in the Olympic Games. The WKF has developed common rules governing all styles. The national WKF organizations coordinate with their respective National Olympic Committees.

WKF karate competition has two disciplines: sparring (kumite) and forms (kata). Competitors may enter either as individuals or as part of a team. Evaluation for kata and kobudō is performed by a panel of judges, whereas sparring is judged by a head referee, usually with assistant referees at the side of the sparring area. Sparring matches are typically divided by weight, age, gender, and experience.

WKF only allows membership through one national organization/federation per country to which clubs may join. The World Union of Karate-do Federations (WUKF) offers different styles and federations a world body they may join, without having to compromise their style or size. The WUKF accepts more than one federation or association per country.

Sport organizations use different competition rule systems. Light contact rules are used by the WKF, WUKO, IASK and WKC. Full contact karate rules used by Kyokushinkai, Seidokaikan and other organizations. Bogu kumite (full contact with protective shielding of targets) rules are used in the World Koshiki Karate-Do Federation organization. Shinkaratedo Federation use boxing gloves. Within the United States, rules may be under the jurisdiction of state sports authorities, such as the boxing commission.

=== Mixed Martial Arts (MMA) ===
Karate, although not widely used in mixed martial arts, has been effective for some MMA practitioners. Various styles of karate are practiced in MMA: Lyoto Machida and John Makdessi practice Shotokan; Bas Rutten and Georges St-Pierre train in Kyokushin; Michelle Waterson holds a black belt in American Free Style Karate; Stephen Thompson practices American Tetsushin Ryu Kempo Karate and both Gunnar Nelson and Robert Whittaker practiced Gōjū-ryū. Additionally, John Kavanagh has been successful as coach with a Kenpo Karate pedigree.

=== Olympic Games ===
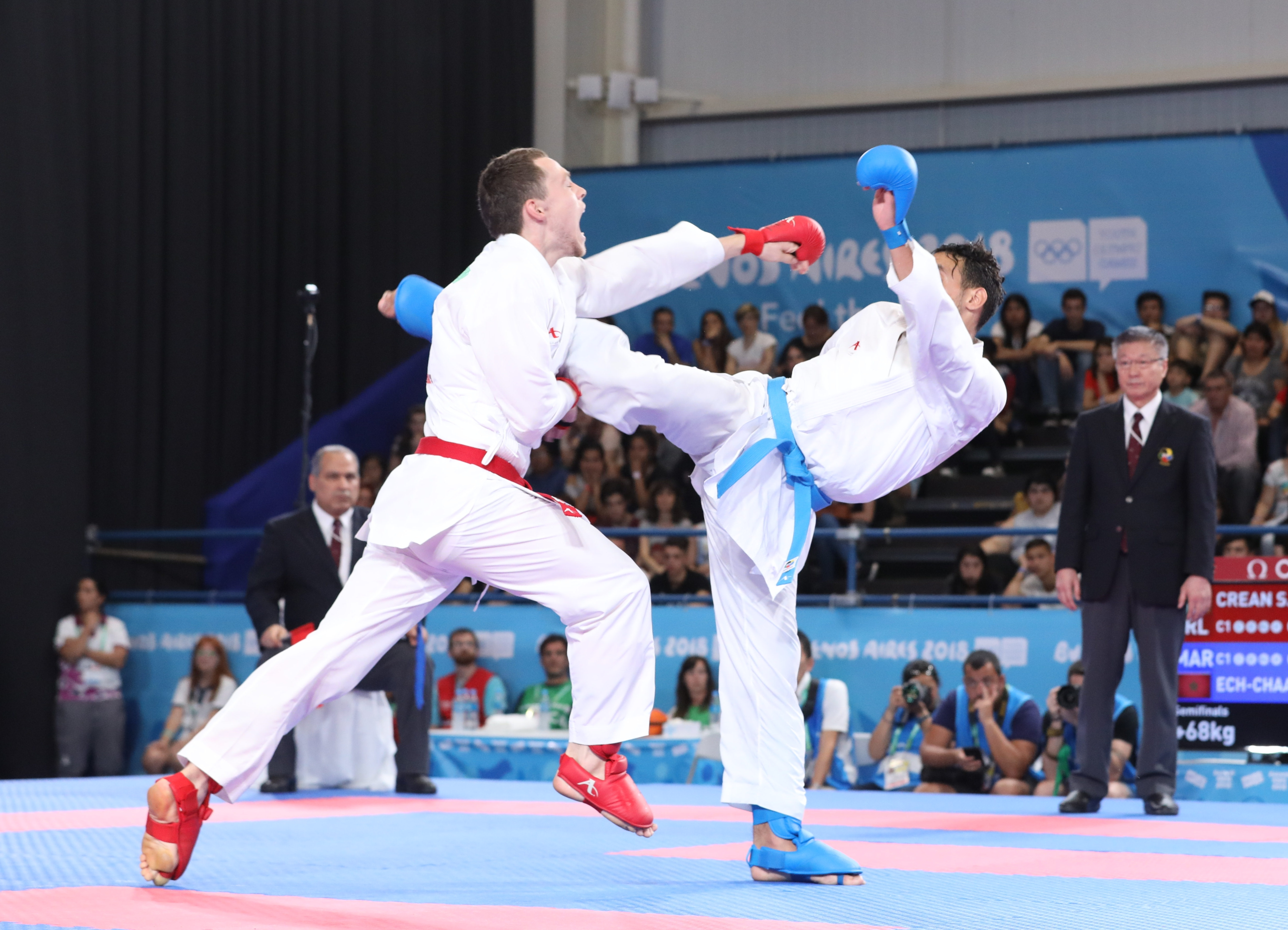
Bronze medal match at the 2018 Summer Youth Olympics in Buenos Aires, Argentina.

In August 2016, the International Olympic Committee approved karate as an Olympic sport beginning at the 2020 Summer Olympics. Karate also debuted at the 2018 Summer Youth Olympics. During this debut of Karate in the Summer Olympics, sixty competitors from around the world competed in the Kumite competition, and twenty competed in the Kata competition. In September 2015, karate was included in a shortlist along with baseball, softball, skateboarding, surfing, and sport climbing to be considered for inclusion in the 2020 Summer Olympics; and in June 2016, the executive board of the International Olympic Committee (IOC) announced that they would support the proposal to include all of the shortlisted sports in the 2020 Games. Finally, on 3 August 2016, all five sports (counting baseball and softball together as one sport) were approved for inclusion in the 2020 Olympic program.

Karate was not included in the 2024 Olympic Games, although it has made the shortlist for inclusion, alongside nine others, in the 2028 Summer Olympics.

== Rank system ==
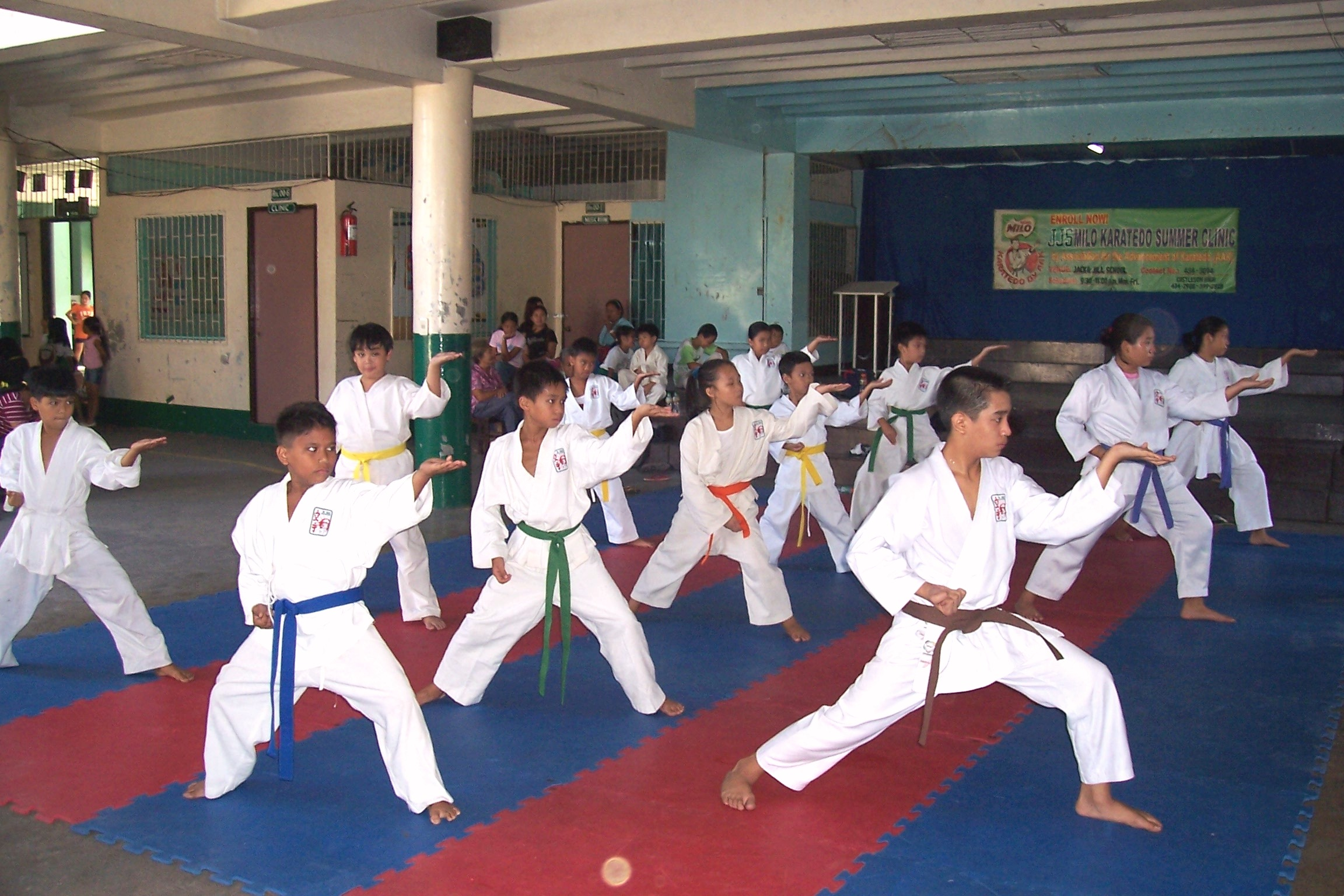
Karatekas wearing different colored belts

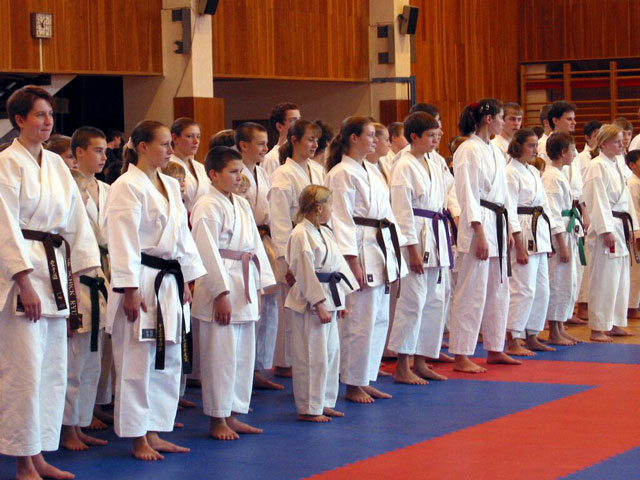
Karatekas at a dojo with different colored belts

In 1924, Gichin Funakoshi, founder of Shotokan Karate, adopted the Dan system from the judo founder Jigoro Kano using a rank scheme with a limited set of belt colors. Other Okinawan teachers also adopted this practice. In the Kyū/Dan system the beginner grades start with a higher numbered kyū (e.g., 10th Kyū or Jukyū) and progress toward a lower numbered kyū. The Dan progression continues from 1st Dan (Shodan, or 'beginning dan') to the higher dan grades. Kyū-grade karateka are referred to as "color belt" or mudansha ("ones without dan/rank"). Dan-grade karateka are referred to as yudansha (holders of dan/rank). Yudansha typically wear a black belt. Normally, the first five to six dans are given by examination by superior dan holders, while the subsequent (7 and up) are honorary, given for special merits and/or age reached. Requirements of rank differ among styles, organizations, and schools. Kyū ranks stress Karate stances, Equilibrioception, and motor coordination. Speed and power are added at higher grades.

Minimum age and time in rank are factors affecting promotion. Testing consists of demonstration of techniques before a panel of examiners or senseis. This will vary by school, but testing may include everything learned at that point, or just new information. The demonstration is an application for new rank (shinsa) and may include basics, kata, bunkai, self-defense, routines, tameshiwari (breaking), and kumite (sparring).

== Philosophy ==
In Karate-Do Kyohan, Funakoshi quoted from the Heart Sutra, which is prominent in Shingon Buddhism: "Form is emptiness, emptiness is form itself" (shiki zokuze kū kū zokuze shiki). He interpreted the "kara" of Karate-dō to mean "to purge oneself of selfish and evil thoughts ... for only with a clear mind and conscience can the practitioner understand the knowledge which he receives." Funakoshi believed that one should be "inwardly humble and outwardly gentle." Only by behaving humbly can one be open to Karate's many lessons. This is done by listening and being receptive to criticism. He considered courtesy of prime importance. He said that "Karate is properly applied only in those rare situations in which one really must either down another or be downed by him." Funakoshi did not consider it unusual for a devotee to use Karate in a real physical confrontation no more than perhaps once in a lifetime. He stated that Karate practitioners must "never be easily drawn into a fight." It is understood that one blow from a real expert could mean death. It is clear that those who misuse what they have learned bring dishonor upon themselves. He promoted the character trait of personal conviction. In "time of grave public crisis, one must have the courage ... to face a million and one opponents." He taught that indecisiveness is a weakness.

== Styles ==
Karate is divided into many styles, each with their different training methods, focuses, and cultures; though they mainly originate from the historical Okinawan parent styles of Naha-te, Tomari-te and Shuri-te.

However some of the schools' founders have been sceptical about the division of karate into many styles. Gichin Funakoshi simply stated that there are as many styles as instructors in the world while Kenwa Mabuni explained that the notion of different variations of karate came from outsiders. Even before the popularization of karate in mainland Japan, the idea existed that karate was divided into two branches: Shōrei-ryū, derived from Naha-te, and Shōrin-ryū, drawing on Shuri-te and Tomari-te. but Chōjun Miyagi believed that was just an incorrect perception. Kanken Tōyama disregarded the idea as he supported the "non-school principle". Mas Oyama was actively opposed to the idea of the fragmentation into several karate schools. He believed that making karate a combat sport, as well keeping it as a martial art, could be a possible approach to unify all schools.

By the 1980s, the four main schools of karate in mainland Japan were considered to be Gōjū-ryū, Shotokan, Shitō-ryū, and Wadō-ryū. These four styles are those recognised by the World Karate Federation for international kata competition. Some widespread styles often accepted for kata competition include Kyokushin, Shōrin-ryū, Uechi-Ryū or Isshin-ryū among others.

== World ==
=== Africa ===
Karate has grown in popularity in Africa, particularly in South Africa and Ghana.

=== Americas ===
==== Canada ====
Karate began in Canada in the 1930s and 1940s as Japanese people immigrated to the country. Karate was practised quietly without a large amount of organization. During the Second World War, many Japanese-Canadian families were moved to the interior of British Columbia. Masaru Shintani, at the age of 13, began to study Shorin-Ryu karate in the Japanese camp under Kitigawa. In 1956, after 9 years of training with Kitigawa, Shintani travelled to Japan and met Hironori Otsuka (Wado Ryu). In 1958, Otsuka invited Shintani to join his organization Wado Kai, and in 1969 he asked Shintani to officially call his style Wado.

In Canada during this same time, karate was also introduced by Masami Tsuruoka who had studied in Japan in the 1940s under Tsuyoshi Chitose. In 1954, Tsuruoka initiated the first karate competition in Canada and laid the foundation for the National Karate Association.

In the late 1950s Shintani moved to Ontario and began teaching karate and judo at the Japanese Cultural Centre in Hamilton. In 1966, he began (with Otsuka's endorsement) the Shintani Wado Kai Karate Federation. During the 1970s Otsuka appointed Shintani the Supreme Instructor of Wado Kai in North America. In 1979, Otsuka publicly promoted Shintani to hachidan (8th dan) and privately gave him a kudan certificate (9th dan), which was revealed by Shintani in 1995. Shintani and Otsuka visited each other in Japan and Canada several times, the last time in 1980 two years prior to Otsuka's death. Shintani died 7 May 2000.

==== United States ====
After World War II, members of the United States military learned karate in Okinawa or Japan and then opened schools in the US. In 1945, Robert Trias opened the first dōjō in the United States in Phoenix, Arizona, a Shuri-ryū karate dōjō. In the 1950s, William J. Dometrich, Ed Parker, Cecil T. Patterson, Gordon Doversola, Harold G. Long, Donald Hugh Nagle, George Mattson and Peter Urban all began instructing in the US.

Tsutomu Ohshima began studying karate under Shotokan's founder, Gichin Funakoshi, while a student at Waseda University, beginning in 1948. In 1957, Ohshima received his godan (fifth-degree black belt), the highest rank awarded by Funakoshi. He founded the first university karate club in the United States at California Institute of Technology in 1957. In 1959, he founded the Southern California Karate Association (SCKA) which was renamed Shotokan Karate of America (SKA) in 1969.

In the 1960s, Anthony Mirakian, Richard Kim, Teruyuki Okazaki, John Pachivas, Allen Steen, Gosei Yamaguchi (son of Gōgen Yamaguchi), Michael G. Foster and Pat Burleson began teaching martial arts around the country.

In 1961, Hidetaka Nishiyama, a co-founder of the Japan Karate Association (JKA) and student of Gichin Funakoshi, began teaching in the United States. He founded the International Traditional Karate Federation (ITKF). Takayuki Mikami was sent to New Orleans by the JKA in 1963.

In 1964, Takayuki Kubota relocated the International Karate Association from Tokyo to California.

=== Asia ===
==== Korea ====
Due to past conflict between Korea and Japan, most notably during the Japanese occupation of Korea in the early 20th century, the influence of karate in Korea is a contentious issue. From 1910 until 1945, Korea was annexed by the Japanese Empire. It was during this time that many of the Korean martial arts masters of the 20th century were exposed to Japanese karate. After regaining independence from Japan, many Korean martial arts schools that opened up in the 1940s and 1950s were founded by masters who had trained in karate in Japan as part of their martial arts training.

Won Kuk Lee, a Korean student of Funakoshi, founded the first martial arts school after the Japanese occupation of Korea ended in 1945, called the Chung Do Kwan. Having studied under Gichin Funakoshi at Chuo University, Lee had incorporated taekkyon, kung fu, and karate in the martial art that he taught which he called "Tang Soo Do", the Korean transliteration of the Chinese characters for "Way of Chinese Hand" (唐手道). In the mid-1950s, the martial arts schools were unified under President Rhee Syngman's order, and became taekwondo under the leadership of Choi Hong Hi and a committee of Korean masters. Choi, a significant figure in taekwondo history, had also studied karate under Funakoshi. Karate also provided an important comparative model for the early founders of taekwondo in the formalization of their art including hyung and the belt ranking system. The original taekwondo hyung were identical to karate kata. Eventually, original Korean forms were developed by individual schools and associations. Although the World Taekwondo Federation and International Taekwon-Do Federation are the most prominent among Korean martial arts organizations, tang soo do schools that teach Japanese karate still exist as they were originally conveyed to Won Kuk Lee and his contemporaries from Funakoshi.

==== Soviet Union ====
Karate appeared in the Soviet Union in the mid-1960s, during Nikita Khrushchev's policy of improved international relations. The first Shotokan clubs were opened in Moscow's universities. In 1973, however, the government banned karate—together with all other foreign martial arts—endorsing only the Soviet martial art of sambo. Failing to suppress these uncontrolled groups, the USSR's Sport Committee formed the Karate Federation of USSR in December 1978. On 17 May 1984, the Soviet Karate Federation was disbanded and all karate became illegal again. In 1989, karate practice became legal again, but under strict government regulations, only after the dissolution of the Soviet Union in 1991 did independent karate schools resume functioning, and so federations were formed and national tournaments in authentic styles began.

=== Europe ===
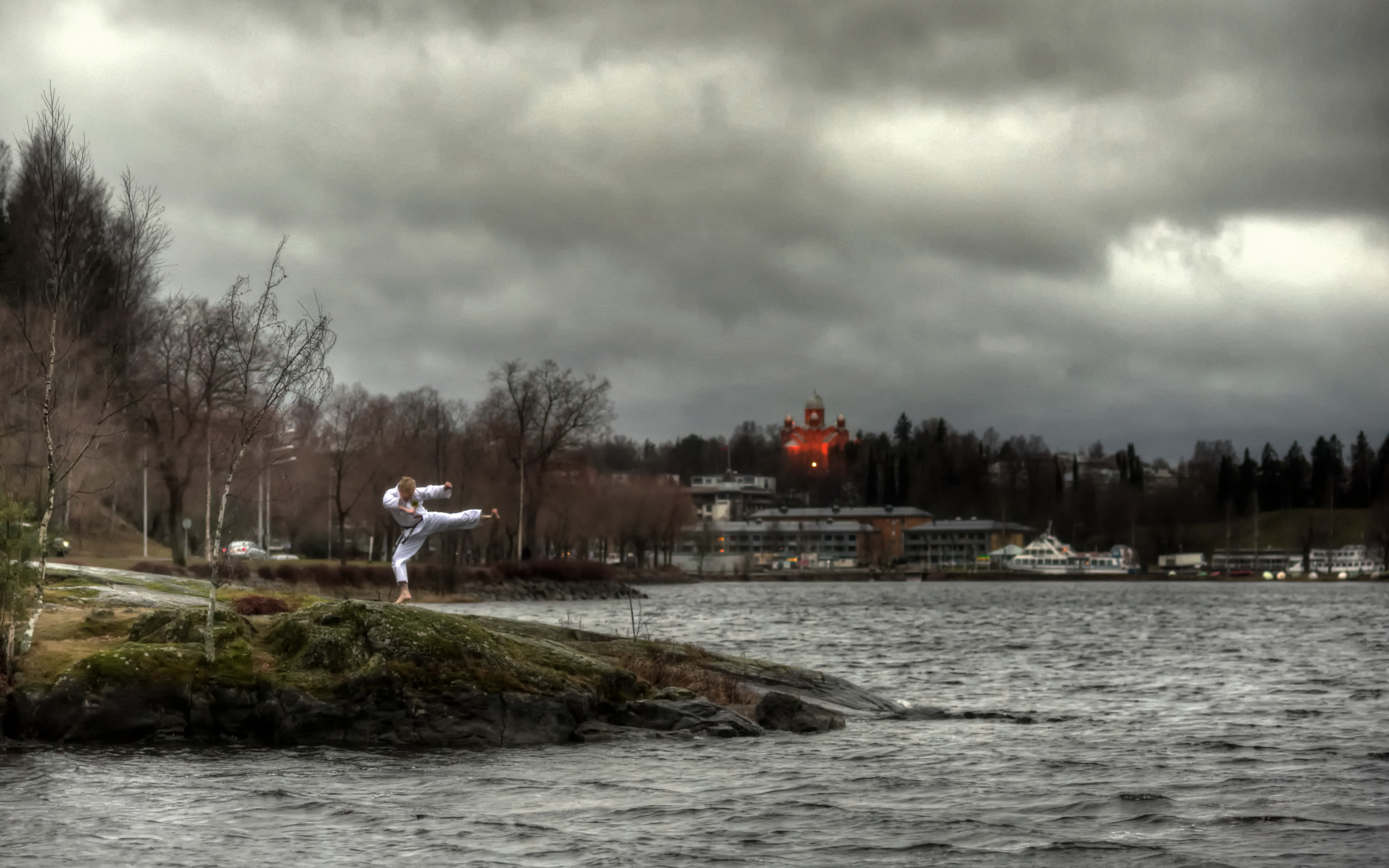
Karate movements in Lappeenranta

In the 1950s and 1960s, several Japanese karate masters began to teach the art in Europe, but it was not until 1965 that the Japan Karate Association (JKA) sent to Europe four well-trained young Karate instructors Taiji Kase, Keinosuke Enoeda, Hirokazu Kanazawa and Hiroshi Shirai. Kase went to France, Enoeada to England and Shirai in Italy. These Masters maintained always a strong link between them, the JKA and the others JKA masters in the world, especially Hidetaka Nishiyama in the US

==== France ====
France Shotokan Karate was created in 1964 by Tsutomu Ohshima. It is affiliated with another of his organizations, Shotokan Karate of America (SKA). However, in 1965 Taiji Kase came from Japan along with Enoeda and Shirai, who went to England and Italy respectively, and karate came under the influence of the JKA.

==== Italy ====
Hiroshi Shirai, one of the original instructors sent by the JKA to Europe along with Kase, Enoeda and Kanazawa, moved to Italy in 1965 and quickly established a Shotokan enclave that spawned several instructors who in their turn soon spread the style all over the country. By 1970 Shotokan karate was the most spread martial art in Italy apart from Judo. Other styles such as Wado Ryu, Goju Ryu and Shito Ryu, are present and well established in Italy, while Shotokan remains the most popular.

==== United Kingdom ====
Vernon Bell, a 3rd Dan Judo instructor who had been instructed by Kenshiro Abbe introduced Karate to England in 1956, having attended classes in Henry Plée's Yoseikan dōjō in Paris. Yoseikan had been founded by Minoru Mochizuki, a master of multiple Japanese martial arts, who had studied Karate with Gichin Funakoshi, thus the Yoseikan style was heavily influenced by Shotokan. Bell began teaching in the tennis courts of his parents' back garden in Ilford, Essex and his group was to become the British Karate Federation. On 19 July 1957, Vietnamese Hoang Nam 3rd Dan, billed as "Karate champion of Indo China", was invited to teach by Bell at Maybush Road, but the first instructor from Japan was Tetsuji Murakami (1927–1987) a 3rd Dan Yoseikan under Minoru Mochizuki and 1st Dan of the JKA, who arrived in England in July 1959.

In 1959, Frederick Gille set up the Liverpool branch of the British Karate Federation, which was officially recognised in 1961. The Liverpool branch was based at Harold House Jewish Boys Club in Chatham Street before relocating to the YMCA in Everton where it became known as the Red Triangle. One of the early members of this branch was Andy Sherry who had previously studied Jujutsu with Jack Britten. In 1961, Edward Ainsworth, another blackbelt Judoka, set up the first Karate study group in Ayrshire, Scotland having attended Bell's third 'Karate Summer School' in 1961.

Outside Bell's organisation, Charles Mack traveled to Japan and studied under Masatoshi Nakayama of the Japan Karate Association who graded Mack to 1st Dan Shotokan on 4 March 1962 in Japan. Shotokai Karate was introduced to England in 1963 by another of Gichin Funakoshi's students, Mitsusuke Harada. Outside the Shotokan stable of karate styles, Wado Ryu Karate was also an early adopted style in the UK, introduced by Tatsuo Suzuki, a 6th Dan at the time in 1964.

Despite the early adoption of Shotokan in the UK, it was not until 1964 that JKA Shotokan officially came to the UK. Bell had been corresponding with the JKA in Tokyo asking for his grades to be ratified in Shotokan having apparently learnt that Murakami was not a designated representative of the JKA. The JKA obliged, and without enforcing a grading on Bell, ratified his black belt on 5 February 1964, though he had to relinquish his Yoseikan grade. Bell requested a visitation from JKA instructors and the next year Taiji Kase, Hirokazu Kanazawa, Keinosuke Enoeda and Hiroshi Shirai gave the first JKA demo at the old Kensington Town Hall on 21 April 1965. Hirokazu Kanazawa and Keinosuke Enoeda stayed and Murakami left (later re-emerging as a 5th Dan Shotokai under Harada).

In 1966, members of the former British Karate Federation established the Karate Union of Great Britain (KUGB) under Hirokazu Kanazawa as chief instructor and affiliated to JKA. Keinosuke Enoeda came to England at the same time as Kanazawa, teaching at a dōjō in Liverpool. Kanazawa left the UK after 3 years and Enoeda took over. After Enoeda's death in 2003, the KUGB elected Andy Sherry as Chief Instructor. Shortly after this, a new association split off from KUGB, JKA England. An earlier significant split from the KUGB took place in 1991 when a group led by KUGB senior instructor Steve Cattle formed the English Shotokan Academy (ESA). The aim of this group was to follow the teachings of Taiji Kase, formerly the JKA chief instructor in Europe, who along with Hiroshi Shirai created the World Shotokan Karate-do Academy (WKSA), in 1989 to pursue the teaching of "Budo" karate as opposed to what he viewed as "sport karate". Kase sought to return the practice of Shotokan Karate to its martial roots, reintroducing among other things open hand and throwing techniques that had been side lined as the result of competition rules introduced by the JKA. Both the ESA and the WKSA (renamed the Kase-Ha Shotokan-Ryu Karate-do Academy (KSKA) after Kase's death in 2004) continue following this path today. In 1975, Great Britain became the first team ever to take the World male team title from Japan after being defeated the previous year in the final.

=== Oceania ===
The World Karate Federation was first introduced to Oceania as the Oceanian Karate Federation 1973.

==== Australia ====
The Australian Karate Federation, under the World Karate Federation, was first introduced in 1970. In 1972 Frank Novak became the first fully qualified Shotokan instructor to arrive in Australia and teach in the country, establishing the first Shotokan Karate dojo in Australia. At karate's debut in the Olympics at the 2020 Summer Olympics, Tsuneari Yahiro became Australia's first Karate Olympian.

== In film and popular culture ==
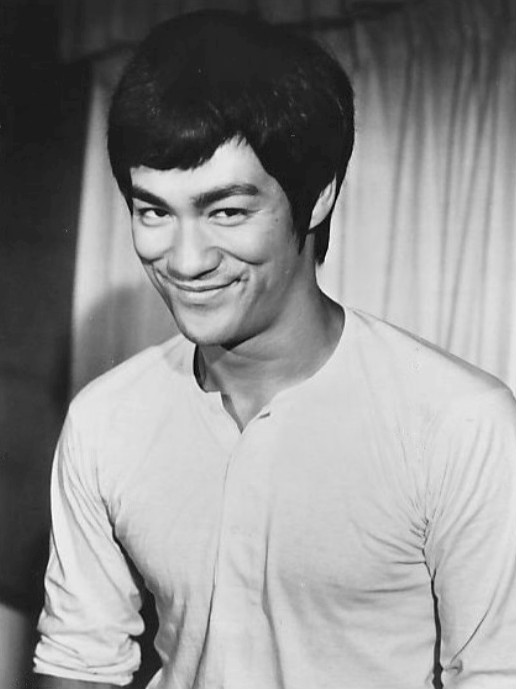
Bruce Lee is known for practicing many martial arts styles, including Karate, having trained with Chuck Norris for many years.

Karate spread rapidly in the West through popular culture. In 1950s popular fiction, karate was at times described to readers in near-mythical terms, and it was credible to show Western experts of unarmed combat as unaware of Eastern martial arts of this kind. Following the inclusion of judo at the 1964 Tokyo Olympics, there was growing mainstream Western interest in Japanese martial arts, particularly karate, during the 1960s. By the 1970s, martial arts films (especially kung fu films and Bruce Lee flicks from Hong Kong) had formed a mainstream genre and launched the "kung fu craze" which propelled karate and other Asian martial arts into mass popularity. However, mainstream Western audiences at the time generally did not distinguish between different Asian martial arts such as karate, kung fu and tae kwon do.

In the James Bond films, the main protagonist James Bond is exceptionally skillful in martial arts. He is an expert in various types of martial arts including Karate, as well as Judo, Aikido, Brazilian jiu-jitsu, Filipino Eskrima and Krav Maga.

During the late 20th century, specifically during the 80s and 90s, karate saw a rise in mainstream popularity. America in the 80s took hold of the martial arts craze and began to produce more homegrown films in the martial arts genre. Films weren't the only popular visual representation of Karate in the 80s, just as arcades grew in popularity, so did Karate in arcade fighting games. The first video game to feature fist fighting was Heavyweight Champ in 1976, but it was Karate Champ that popularized the one-on-one fighting game genre in arcades in 1984. In 1987, Capcom released Street Fighter, featuring multiple Karateka characters.

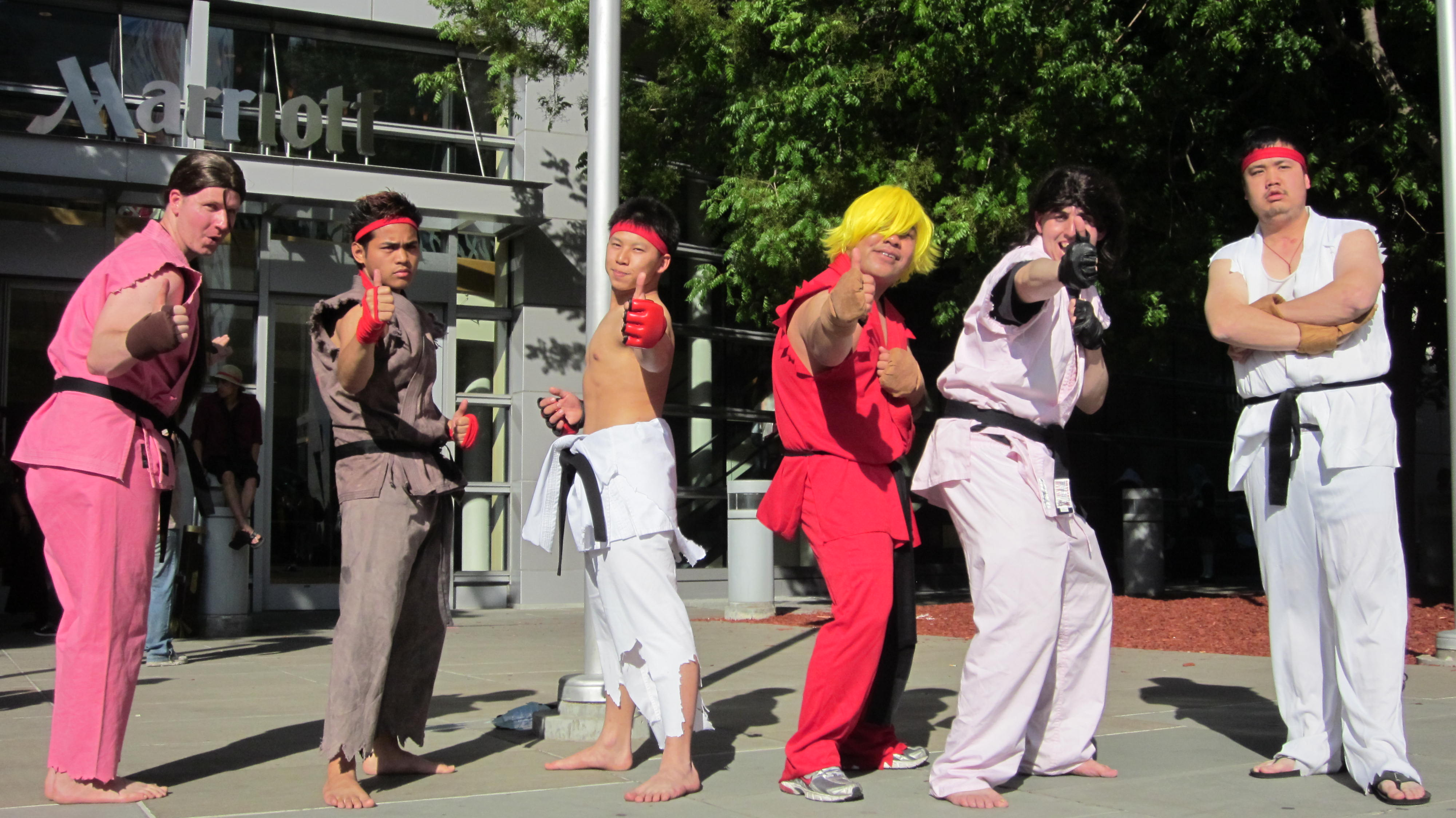
Cosplayers of Karateka characters from Street Fighter

The Karate Kid (1984) and its sequels The Karate Kid, Part II (1986), The Karate Kid, Part III (1989) and The Next Karate Kid (1994) are films relating the fictional story of an American adolescent's introduction into karate. Its television sequel, Cobra Kai (2018), has led to similar growing interest in karate. The success of The Karate Kid further popularized karate (as opposed to Asian martial arts more generally) in mainstream American popular culture. Karate Kommandos is an animated children's show, with Chuck Norris appearing to reveal the moral lessons contained in every episode. Dragon Ball (1984–present) is a Japanese media franchise (Anime) whose characters use a variety and hybrid of east Asian martial arts styles, including Karate and Wing Chun (Kung fu). Dragon Ball was originally inspired by the classical 16th-century Chinese novel Journey to the West, combined with elements of Hong Kong martial arts films, with influences of Jackie Chan and Bruce Lee.

In the film series The Matrix, Neo uses a variety of martial arts styles. Neo's skill in martial arts was shown as having been downloaded into his brain, which granted combat abilities equivalent to a martial artist with decades of experience. Kenpo Karate is one of the many styles Neo learns as part of his computerised combat training. As part of the preparation for the movie, Yuen Woo-ping had Keanu Reeves undertake four months of martial arts training in a variety of different styles.

Film stars and their styles
Practitioner	Fighting style
Shin Koyamada	Keishinkan
Sonny Chiba	Kyokushin
Sean Connery	Kyokushin
Hiroyuki Sanada	Kyokushin
Dolph Lundgren	Kyokushin
Michael Jai White	Kyokushin
Yasuaki Kurata	Shito-ryu
Fumio Demura	Shitō-ryū
Don "The Dragon" Wilson	Gōjū-ryu
Richard Norton	Gōjū-ryu
Yukari Oshima	Gōjū-ryu
Leung Siu-Lung	Gōjū-ryu
Wesley Snipes	Shotokan
Jean-Claude Van Damme	Shotokan
Jim Kelly	Shōrin-ryū
Joe Lewis	Shōrin-ryū
Tadashi Yamashita	Shōrin-ryū
Matt Mullins	Shōrei-ryū
Sho Kosugi	Shindō jinen-ryū
Weng Weng	Undetermined

Many other film stars such as Bruce Lee, Chuck Norris, Jackie Chan, Sammo Hung, and Jet Li come from a range of other martial arts.

== See also ==
- Comparison of karate styles
- Japanese martial arts
- Karate World Championships
- Karate at the Summer Olympics
- Karate at the World Games
