= Henry Plée =

French martial artist (1923–2014)

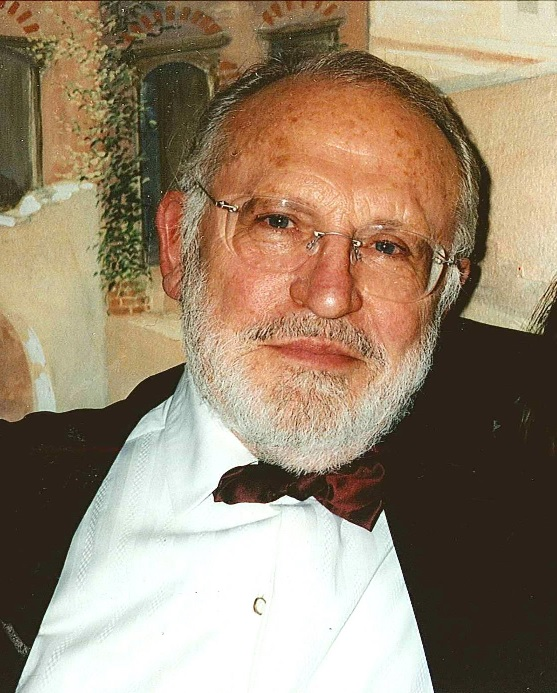
- Henry Plée (1923-2014)
- Born: May 24, 1923; Arras, France
- Died: 19 August 2014 (aged 91); Paris
- Other names: H.D. Plée; Henri Plée; Henry D. Plée; Henry-Désiré Plée
- Nationality: (France) French
- Style: Karate, Judo, Aikido, Kendo, Bōjutsu, French savate
- Teachers: Gichin Funakoshi, Murakami, Hiroo Mochizuki Enoeda, Yoshinao Nanbu, Taiji Kase, Fukuda Rikutaro, Tsutomu Ohshima, Tsuneyoshi Ogura
- Rank: 10th dan Karate; 5th dan Judo; 4th dan Aikido; 3rd dan Jujutsu; 1st dan Kendo; 1st dan Bōjutsu

Other information
- Spouse: Léa Plée Jabri
- Children: Henry Alcide "Ricou" Plée (deceased); Pascal Plée, 6th dan karate, teacher Thierry Plée, 2nd dan judo teacher Christophe Plée (deceased); Arnaud Plée; Elodie Plée
- Notable students: Dominique Valera, 9th dan Roland Habersetzer, 9th dan Guy Sauvin, 8th dan Alain Setrouck, 8th dan Francis Didier, 7th dan François Petitdemange, 6th dan Jacques Delcourt, 4th dan Vernon Bell, 10th dan
- Website: www.henryplee.com

Henry Plée (also named H.D. Plée, Henri Plée, Henry D. Plée, or Henry-Désiré Plée, 24 May 1923; Arras, Nord-Pas-de-Calais–19 August 2014; Paris) was a French martial artist who is considered the "father of European and French karate". He was one of the rare 10th dan karate masters living outside Japan, and one of the few Westerners to hold this rank. At the time of his death, Plée was also the oldest and highest karate ranking Westerner alive, with more than 60 years in the fighting arts, including 50 in martial arts. He was a pioneer in introducing karate to France and Europe, and has taught many of Europe's highest ranking karate masters.

== Background ==
Henry Plée was born in Arras, Nord-Pas-de-Calais, France on 24 May 1923. His studies were interrupted by World War II in 1940.

An only son, Henry Plée started his sports career with gymnastics, weight lifting, French savate, English Boxing, Greco-Roman wrestling, Ju Jutsu, and fencing with his father Alcide Plée, who was a sword master since 1912. He diversified into judo in 1945 at the 'Judo Club de France', Mikonosuke Kawaishi's second club. He was the 96th French black belt and is now ranked 5th dan at judo.

Henry Plée demonstrated powerful powerful kicks and punches. In 1946 he returned to French savate, at the Banville club, also known as French kickboxing, then the only remaining club of its kind. There he trained with fighters such as Rigal, Pierre Plasait, Cayron, and Pierre Baruzy, but he was still felt the need to pursue something deeper, and more demanding.

He discovered aikido through Minoru Mochizuki, and later learned of karate from an article in Life magazine. He was introduced to Rikutaro, the translator of his Judo Kodokan magazine, who told him that he had learned karate in Tokyo from Gichin Funakoshi. This marked the beginning of his karate career in 1953, with assistance from Donn Draeger in Japan.

== Karate ==
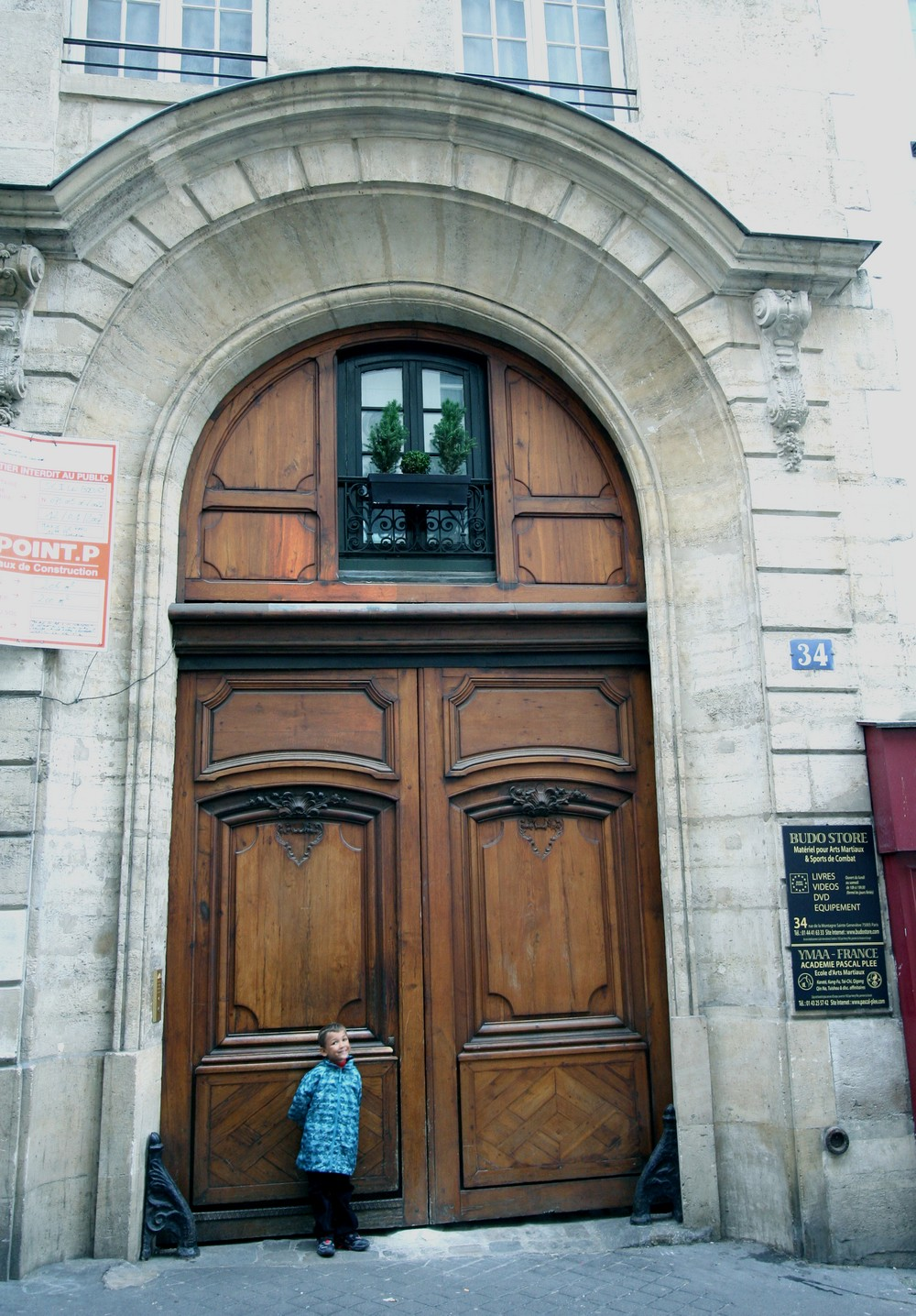
Door entrance to the dojo at 34 rue de la Montagne Sainte-Geneviève

In 1955 he founded his dojo - the Karate Club de France (KCF), which later became the Académie française des Arts Martiaux (AFAM), and subsequently 'Shobudo', also known as 'The Mountain/ La Montagne' (in French) or as 'Dojo de la Montagne Sainte-Geneviève' in Paris. It is described as the oldest karate dojo in Europe, and has reportedly produced 32 French, Europen, and world championships since its founding.

At the dojo, he taught the four main Japanese martial arts: karate, judo, aikido, and kendo. Plée trained many black belts, who later helped shape European karate institutions, and went on to become some of the highest-ranking karate masters in Europe.

He frequently traveled to Japan, where he met with and trained by some of the most renowned karate masters of all styles. He invited many of them to visit France, and even financed travel of numerous Japanese and Chinese martial arts experts to the country. These experts taught at Shobudo, where techniques and knowledge karate were introduced to Europe.

In 1956, he founded the 'French Federation of Karate and Boxing' (Fédération Française de Karaté et de Boxe Libre), which later became part of the 'French Federation of Judo and Associated Disciplines' (Fédération française de Judo et Disciplines Associées - FFJDA) in 1960. The creation of the 'European Union of Karate' (Union Européenne de Karaté) in 1966, reflected a move towards karate’s independence from judo federations, and a refusal to privilege one karate style over another. He also served as a Technical Advisor to the 'European Karate Federation (EKF)', and as its General Secretary in 1967.

For 21 years (1950–1971), he financed and published the first bilingual (French/ English) karate magazine, Budo Magazine Europe. He also published Judo Kodokan, a translation of the Japanese magazine of the Tokyo Kodokan. He wrote books, and appeared in the movie La Vie, l'amour, la mort.

At La Montagne, Plée maintained a private Martial Arts library and operated a Martial Arts store named 'Budostore', which sold equipments, books, videos, and DVDs. Plée also headed a European think-tank focusead on the essence and spirituality of Martial Arts, and he regularly publishes his chronicles on-line.

From 200 karate practitioners in 1961, Henry Plée's efforts helped grow participation to more than 200,000 practitioners in France by the time of his death. The French government regarded him as one of the greatest international experts in Martial Arts, and knighted Plée with the French Ordre national du Mérite in 2008.

== Ranks ==
Since the 1950s, numerous trips to Japan allowed him to meet some of the most famous karate masters of all styles, and to pass belts in various styles and disciplines:

=== Karate ===
- 10th dan, Hanshi Karate in Japan, by Tsuneyoshi Ogura in 1987.
- 9th dan, Hanshi Karate in Japan, by Tsuneyoshi Ogura in 1984.
- 8th dan, Shihan Karate in Japan, by Tsuneyoshi Ogura in 1972, and in France by the Fédération Française de Karaté - FFKAMA in 1975.
- 5th dan, Renshi Karate in Japan, by Chojiro Tani.
- 1st, 2nd, 3rd dan, karate in France, by Minoru Mochizuki.

=== Judo ===
- 5th dan, Judo.
- The 96th French black belt.

=== Aikido ===
- 3rd dan, Aikido, by Masamichi Noro.
- 2nd dan, Aikikai Hombu Aikido, by Tadashi Abe.
- 1st dan, Yoseikan Aikido, by Minoru Mochizuki.

=== Kendo ===
- 1st dan, Kendo, by Minoru Mochizuki.

=== Bōjutsu ===
- 1st dan, Bo-Jutsu, by Minoru Mochizuki.

== Awards ==
Henry Plée has been granted the following awards:

- 'Katana of Honour' at the 25th 'Martial Art Festival of Bercy', on 27 March 2010.
- Knight of Ordre national du Mérite, on 12 December 2008.
- Nominated 'Ambassador Martial Art' by 'Hall of Fame Kyusho international' in 2006, 'Ambassador for peace', and then 'Sensei of the century' in 2000.
- 'Professor of the Century' at the 14th 'Martial Art Festival of Bercy' in 1999.
- Golden medal of 'French ministry for Youth and Sports' (Ministère de la Santé et des Sports - France).
- President of Honor of the 'French Federation of Karate and Associated Martial Arts' (Fédération française de karaté et disciplines associées - FFKAMA).
- President of Honor of the 'Karate European Union' (Union Européenne de Karaté - UEK).
- President of Honor of the 'French Federation of Judo and Associated Disciplines' (Fédération française de Judo et Disciplines Associées - FFJDA).
- Member of the 'Honorary Board of the International Fund for Preservation of Martial Arts' (Fonds International pour la Préservation des Arts Martiaux - FIPAM).

== Teachers ==
Henry Plée has traveled frequently to Japan in order to learn and meet with the most famous karate masters of all styles such as Gichin Funakoshi and many others. Along the years, he financed the visits to France of more than 17 Japanese and Chinese martial arts experts, including:

- Hiroo Mochizuki, 9th dan in Karate (FFKDA), 8th dan in Aikido, 8th dan in Jujitsu, 3rd dan in Judo, 7th dan in Iaido and Kobudo. Founder, Sōke, and Hanshi of Yoseikan Budo. 2nd dan in Shotokan karate in 1957 (Born 1936)
- Tetsuji Murakami, 3rd dan in Shotokan karate in 1958, 2nd dan in Kendo, 1st dan in Aikido, and 1st dan in Iaido (1927–1987)
- Tsutomu Oshima, 3rd dan in Shotokan karate in 1959
- Yoshinao Nanbu, 9th dan in Karate (FFKDA). Founder and Doshu-Sōke of Nanbudō in 1978 and of the Worldwide Nanbudo Federation-WNF. 2nd dan in Karate in 1964, Japan champion in 1962 (Born 1943)
- Taiji Kase, 9th dan in Karate in 2004. 5th dan in Shotokan karate in 1967 (1929–2004)
- Hiroshi Shirai, 9th dan in Karate in 1999. 5th dan in Shotokan karate at the time
- Keinosuke Enoeda, 9th dan in Karate (JKA). 2nd dan in Karate at the time
- Mitsusuke Harada, 4th dan in Shotokai karate, and student of Shigeru Egami
- Tadashi Abe
- Tsuneyoshi Ogura, 10th dan in Goju Ryu karate

By inviting Japanese masters to teach in France, Plée was able to continue learning at an advanced level rather than restarting his training in each Japanese school. This approach also influenced the development of French karate, which incorporated elements from different karate styles rather than privileging a single school.

== Students ==
Henry Plée instructed many black belts who became the foundation of the European karate institutions, and are today some of the highest ranking karate masters in Europe, including:

- Jean Pierre Lavorato, 9th dan karate
- Dominique Valera, 9th dan karate and 9th degree full-contact karate, world champion karate in 1972
- Roland Habersetzer, 9th dan karate, author of many books on karate
- Guy Sauvin, 8th dan karate, world champion karate in 1972, and founder of the Sei Do Jyuku style
- Alain Setrouck, 8th dan Kyokushinkai karate, world champion karate in 1972
- Francis Didier, 7th dan karate, President of the 'French Federation of Karate and Associated Martial Arts' (Fédération française de karaté et disciplines associées - FFKDA)
- François Petitdemange, 6th dan karate, world champion karate in 1972
- Jacques Delcourt, 4th dan karate, President and founder of the 'French Federation of Karate and Associated Martial Arts' Fédération française de karaté et disciplines associées - FFKDA) for 23 years, President and founder of the European Karate Federation, and President and founder of the World Karate Federation.
- Vernon Bell, Yoseikan karate, and 10th dan ju-jutsu, introduced karate to Great Britain (1922–2004).

== Bibliography ==
Henry Plée is the author of hundreds of articles and reviews, and has held numerous conferences for 60 years. He has written books under the names Henry Plée, Henry Plee, Henri Plée, Henri Plee, Henry-Désiré Plée, H.D. Plee or H.D. Plée, which are known as the quintessence of the original Martial Arts and strongly focused on the awakening of the Human Being.

His books are:

- The sublime and ultimate art of vital points / L'Art sublime et ultime des points vitaux (in French), published in 2004.
- Martial chronicles / Chroniques martiales (in French), published in 2002.
- The sublime and ultimate art of vital points / L'arte sublime ed estrema dei punti vitali (in Italian), published in 1999.
- The sublime and ultimate art of vital points: kyûshô, vital points, dim mak, killing touches, dim hsueh, poison touches / L'Art sublime et ultime des points vitaux: kyûshô, points vitaux, dim mak, touches mortelles, dim hsueh, touches poison (in French), published in 1998.
- The sublime and ultimate art of vital points: kyûshô, vital points, dim mak, killing touches, dim hsueh, poison touches / El arte sublime y ultimo de los puntos vitales: kyûshô, puntos vitales, dim mak, toques mortales, dim hsueh, toques veneno (in Spanish), published in 1998.
- Aikido up to 1st dan in image / L'aikido jusqu'à la ceinture noire 1er dan par l'image (in French), published in 1975.
- Official basic Karate Katas: Shotokan, published in 1973.
- The secret vital points of the human body / Les points vitaux secrets du corps humain (in French), published in 1972.
- Karate: Beginner to Black Belt, published in 1967.
- Karate in pictures / Karaté par l'image (in French), published in 1962.
- Karate by pictures: the science of self-defence by the empty hand lucidly explained and illustrated, published in 1962.
- ABC of karate-do / ABC du karate-do (in French), published in 1957.
- Conquer or die, the spirit and technics of karate-do: by H.D. Plee / Vaincre ou mourir, l'esprit et la technique du Karaté-Do: par H. D. Plée (in French), published in 1955.
- Official international Judo directory / Annuaire officiel de Judo international (in French), published in 1950.
- Judo international (in French), published in 1948.
- Judo Kodokan and Budo Magazine (in French and English), published from 1950 to 1973.
