= François Petitdemange =

French karateka (1945–2025)

Personal information
- Born: 12 January 1945 Vosges, France
- Died: 16 November 2025 (aged 80)

Sport
- Country: France
- Sport: Karate
Achievements and titles
Representing France
Karate World Championships
| Bronze medal – third place | 1970 Tokyo | Team |
| Gold medal – first place | 1972 Paris | Team |
European Karate Championships
| Gold medal – first place | 1969 London | Team |
| Silver medal – second place | 1970 Hamburg | Team |
| Gold medal – first place | 1971 Paris | Team |
| Gold medal – first place | 1972 Brussels | Team |
| Gold medal – first place | 1973 Valencia | Individual Kumite -80 kg |
| Gold medal – first place | 1974 London | Team |
| Gold medal – first place | 1975 Ostend | Team |

François Petitdemange (French: [fʁɑ̃swa pətidəmɑ̃ʒ]; 12 January 1945 – 16 November 2025) was a French karateka.

Petitdemange won the Karate World Championships with the French team in 1972 and won the team European Karate Championships in 1969, 1971, 1972, 1973, 1974, and 1975, as well as an individual kumite -80 kg championship in 1973.

Petitdemange died on 16 November 2025, at the age of 80.
