= 1971 European Karate Championships =

Karate competition

- Location: Paris, France
- Dates: May 2 to 4
- Competitors: 135 from 15 nations

The 1971 European Karate Championships, the 6th edition, was held in the sports complex of Coubertine Hall in Paris, France from May 2 to 4, 1971. 1971 was the year Scotland and Finland were accepted by the EKU and no longer participated as part of Great Britain and there was an introduction of weight classes.

== Medal table ==
* Host nation (France)

Rank	Nation	Gold	Silver	Bronze	Total
1	France*	2	1	1	4
2	Belgium	0	1	0	1
3	West Germany	0	0	2	2
4	Yugoslavia	0	0	1	1
Totals (4 entries)		2	2	4	8

== Medalists ==
Event	Gold	Silver	Bronze
Ippon	Dominique Valera; France	Gilbert Gruss; France	Francis Didier; France
Ippon	Dominique Valera; France	Gilbert Gruss; France	Joachim Otremba; West Germany
Team	France	Belgium	Yugoslavia; West Germany
