= 1966 European Karate Championships =

Karate competition

- Location: Paris, France
- Dates: May 7 to 9
- Competitors: 54 from 6 nations

The 1966 European Karate Championships, the 1st edition, was held in Paris, France from May 7 to 9, 1966. In 1961, Jacques Delcourt was appointed President of French Karate Federation, which was at that stage an associated member of the Judo Federation. In 1963 he invited the six other known European federations (Italy, Great Britain, Belgium, Germany, Switzerland and Spain) to come to France for the first-ever international karate event, and Great Britain and Belgium accepted the invitation.

== Medal table ==
* Host nation (France)

Rank	Nation	Gold	Silver	Bronze	Total
1	France*	2	1	1	4
2	Switzerland	0	1	0	1
3	Italy	0	0	1	1
Totals (3 entries)		2	2	2	6

== Medalists ==
Event	Gold	Silver	Bronze
Ippon	Patrick Baroux; France	Guy Sauvin; France	Franco Gerometta; Italy
Ippon	Patrick Baroux; France	Guy Sauvin; France	Alain Setrouk; France
Team	France	Switzerland	Italy
