= Karate in the United Kingdom =

- Country: United Kingdom
- Governing body: British Karate Federation
- National team: Great Britain Olympics team

International competitions
- European Karate Championships; Karate World Championships; Summer Olympics

Karate was first introduced in the United Kingdom by Vernon Bell, a judo instructor who attended karate classes with Henry Plée in Paris.

== History ==
Following its introduction by Vernon Bell, karate was popularised in the UK by various instructors, Japanese and otherwise. Organisations such as the Karate Union of Great Britain were established by experts and enthusiasts to promote karate in the UK.

The Japan Karate Association sent several professional instructors to Britain to spread their Shotokan style of karate, starting with Taiji Kase, Hirokazu Kanazawa, Keinosuke Enoeda and Hiroshi Shirai in 1965. Other karate styles were also established in the UK, including Wado-ryu via Tatsuo Suzuki, and Kyokushin via Steve Arneil.

Karate in the UK was the subject of controversy in its early years, following the 1966 murder of Andy Allen by Anthony Creamer, a street fighter and self-taught karate enthusiast.

== National governing body ==
The British Karate Federation (BKF) is the largest karate association in the United Kingdom, and a member of the British Olympic Committee. The BKF is affiliated with the European Karate Federation (EKF), as well as the World Karate Federation (WKF).

On behalf of the British Olympic Committee, the BKF was the only karate association authorised to send athletes to the 2020 Olympics.

== International competition ==
The United Kingdom was once considered a "world power" of sport karate, particularly from the 1970s to 1990s. In the 21st century, the UK has produced four WKF senior world champions: Leon Walters, Rory Daniels, Paul Newby, and Jordan Thomas.

Although the UK is represented by Team GB at the Summer Olympics, England, Ireland, Scotland, and Wales each have separate federations represented in the EKF and WKF.

== Today ==
Karate is one of the most popular martial arts in the United Kingdom today. In Scotland, it was noted as the fastest-growing girls' sport between 2011/12 and 2016/17.

== Bibliography ==
- The Kanazawa Years : Reminiscences by Michael Randall, 7th Dan on a Golden Age in British Karate, Shoto Publishing, 1998, ISBN 978-0953028733
