= 1972 European Karate Championships =

Karate competitions

- Location: Brussels, Belgium
- Dates: May 4–6, 1972.
- Competitors: 195 from 13 nations

The 1972 European Karate Championships, the 7th edition of the European Karate Championships, was held in Brussels, Belgium from May 2 to 4, 1972.

== Medal table ==
* Host nation (Belgium)

Rank	Nation	Gold	Silver	Bronze	Total
1	France	5	2	1	8
2	Great Britain	0	2	0	2
3	Netherlands	0	1	1	2
4	Belgium*	0	0	5	5
5	Italy	0	0	1	1
5	Sweden	0	0	1	1
5	West Germany	0	0	1	1
Totals (7 entries)		5	5	10	20

== Medalists ==
Event	Gold	Silver	Bronze
Kumite -65 kg	(France) Roger Paschy	(United Kingdom) Graham Mitchell	(Netherlands) Harold La Rose (Belgium) Victor Tatarevic
Kumite -75 kg	(France) Guy Sauvin	(France) Francis Didier	(Belgium) Geert Lemmens (West Germany) Günter Mohr
Kumite - 80 kg	(France) Dominique Valera	(Netherlands) Jan Kallenbach	(France) Alain Setrouck (Belgium) Jeff Peeters
Open Kumite	(France) Gilbert Gruss	(France) Dominique Valera	(Belgium) Geert Lemmens (Sweden) Jack Lindau

=== Team ===
Event	Gold	Silver	Bronze
Kumite	France	United Kingdom	Italy; Belgium
