= 1977 European Karate Championships =

Karate competition

- Location: Paris, France
- Dates: May 2 to 4

The 1977 European Karate Championships, the 12th edition of the European Karate Championships, was held in the sports complex of Coubertine Hall in Paris, France from May 2 to 4, 1977.

== Competition ==
Event	Gold	Silver	Bronze
Kumite -65 kg	(France) Laurent Saïdane	(United Kingdom) Hornigold	(United Kingdom) Michael Jerome (Netherlands) Rob Walraven
Kumite -70 kg	(West Germany) Willy Voss	(Austria) Topil	(France) Jean-Luc Montama (France) Pierre Berthier
Kumite - 75 kg	(Spain) Jose Martinez	(France) Christian Gauze	(Italy) Franco Paganini (Spain) Miguel Angel Serrano
Kumite - 80 kg	(United Kingdom) Stanley Knighton	(Netherlands) Otti Roethof	(France) Marc Deluca (United Kingdom) Dennis Whyte
Kumite - + 80 kg	(France) Pierre Montel	(France) Pierre Blot	(Italy) Massimo Di Luigi (United Kingdom) Eugene Codrington
Open Kumite	(Netherlands) Ludwig Kotzebue	(United Kingdom) Michael Dinsdale	(Scotland) David Coulter (France) Patrice Belrhiti

=== Team kumite ===
Event	Gold	Silver	Bronze
Kata	United Kingdom	Italy	Luxembourg; Spain
