= Karate Federation of Armenia =

Sporting Organization

Karate Federation of Armenia logo

The Armenian National Karate Federation (Armenian: Հայաստանի կարատեի ազգային ֆեդերացիա, romanized: Hayastani karatev azgayin federats’ia), sometimes known as the Karate Federation of Armenia, is the regulating body of karate in Armenia, governed by the Armenian Olympic Committee. The headquarters of the federation is located in Yerevan.

== History ==
The Federation is currently led by president Grigory Mikayelyan. The Federation is a full member of the World Karate Federation and the European Karate Federation. The Federation manages several karate clubs and sub-organizations throughout the country. Armenian karate athletes participate in various international karate competitions, including the Karate World Championships and the European Karate Championships.

== Activities ==
The Federation organizes the annual Armenian Karate Championships. In 2021, the 33rd Armenian Karate Championships were held in the Mika Sports Arena. The event brought together athletes across Armenia and from Artsakh.

== See also ==
- Armenian Kyokushin Karate Federation
- Armenian Shotokan Karate Federation
- Sport in Armenia
