= 1980 European Karate Championships =

Karate competition

- Location: Barcelona, Spain
- Dates: May 5 - 7, 1980

The 1980 European Karate Championships, the 15th edition, was held in Barcelona, Catalonia, Spain from May 5 to 7, 1980.

== Competition ==
| Event | Gold | Silver | Bronze |
|---|---|---|---|
| Kata | (Italy) Maurizio Marangoni | (Spain) Deogracias Medina | (Italy) Rossano Ruffini |
| Kumite -65 kg | (Spain) Jose Arsenal Perez | (Italy) Roberto De Luca | (Finland) Jukka Lindström (Finland) Jorma Tuovinen |
| Kumite -70 kg | (Spain) Damian Gonzales | (Spain) Antonio Martinez Amillo | (Finland) Ari Kaunismäki (United Kingdom) Cecil Hackett |
| Kumite -75 kg | (Netherlands) Rob Poley | (France) Daniel Luconi | (Spain) Miguel Angel Serrano (France) Serge Serfati |
| Kumite -80 kg | (France) Claude Pettinella | (Spain) Francisco Manzano | (Netherlands) Otti Roethof (Czechoslovakia) Tibor Mikuš |
| Kumite + 80 kg | (Spain) Jean-Pierre Carbila | (France) Jean-Luc Montama | (Spain) Francisco Torres (Italy) Giovanni Ricciardi |
| Open Kumite | (France) Patrice Ruggiero | (Netherlands) John Reeberg | (Spain) Felipe Hita (France) Marc Pyree |

=== Team ===
| Event | Gold | Silver | Bronze |
|---|---|---|---|
| Kata | Italy | France | West Germany |
| Kumite | France | Spain | Netherlands; Italy |

=== Women's competition ===
| Event | Gold | Silver | Bronze |
|---|---|---|---|
| Kata | (Italy) Maria Grazia Ferrero | (Italy) Marina Sasso | (Spain) María Moreno |
| Team Kata | Italy | San Marino | France |
