= 1976 European Karate Championships =

Karate competition

- Location: Tehran, Iran
- Dates: May 5 to 7

The 1976 European Karate Championships were held in Tehran from 5–7 May 1976 and were the 11th championship in the series. The event was organized by the European Karate Union.

== Competition ==
Event	Gold	Silver	Bronze
Kumite -65 kg	(Scotland)	(Turkey)	(Croatia) (France)
Kumite -70 kg	(United Kingdom) Billy Higgins	(Netherlands)	(Germany)
Kumite -75 kg	(France) Christian Gauze	(Italy)	(Germany)
Kumite -80 kg	(France) Sylvain Renaud	(Netherlands) Otti Roethoff	(Germany)
Kumite + 80 kg	(England) Brian Fitkin		
Open Kumite	(France) Patrice Belrhiti	(Italy)	(Germany)

=== Team ===
Event	Gold	Silver	Bronze
Kumite	England	Scotland	

== Organization ==
In 1972, Soke Farhad Varasteh, an Iranian karate teacher, received a letter from the World Karate Federation (then known as the World Union of Karate-do Organizations, or WUKO) asking him to enter a team in that year's world championships, which would require obtaining a letter from the Iranian Olympic Committee stating that the team officially represented Iran. He obtained the letter and brought a team to compete in the championship in Paris.

While in Paris he participated in technical discussions on karate and the future of WUKO, which had been created two years earlier. Other delegates elected him vice president of WUKO, resulting in greater influence for Iranian karate in the following years, and in 1976, European leaders accepted Iran as a member of the European Karate Federation. Eventually, the 1976 European Karate championships were held in Tehran, the capital of Iran.

Varasteh was the main organizer as president of the Iran Karate Federation. Thirteen countries participated in the championships. Jacques Delcourt, president of the European and international karate federations, was also present.

== Results ==
The 1976 championships were the first to offer several weight classes in the individual event, in this case a total of three. Britain's Billy Higgins won the final of the men's individual kumite -70 kg. The British team was led by Roy Stanhope. Varasteh's students won a gold medal in one event and a silver medal two other categories. Iran's Farrokh Moshfegh also won a bronze medal, and his teammate Morteza Alborzi won fourth place.

Trophies were given to the members by Shah Mohammad Reza Pahlavi's sister.
