= 1968 European Karate Championships =

Karate competition

- Venue: Coubertine Hall
- Location: Paris, France
- Dates: May 2 to 4
- Competitors: 90 from 10 nations

The 1968 European Karate Championships, the 3rd edition, was held in the sports complex of Coubertine Hall in Paris, France from May 2 to 4, 1968.

== Medal table ==
* Host nation (France)

Rank	Nation	Gold	Silver	Bronze	Total
1	France*	2	1	0	3
2	Belgium	0	1	1	2
3	Italy	0	0	1	1
3	Switzerland	0	0	1	1
3	Yugoslavia	0	0	1	1
Totals (5 entries)		2	2	4	8

== Medalists ==
Event	Gold	Silver	Bronze
Ippon	Guy Sauvin; France	Dominique Valera; France	Gerard Grossetête; Switzerland
Ippon	Guy Sauvin; France	Dominique Valera; France	Richard Kosakiewitch; Belgium
Team	France	Belgium	Italy; Yugoslavia
