= Shintaido =

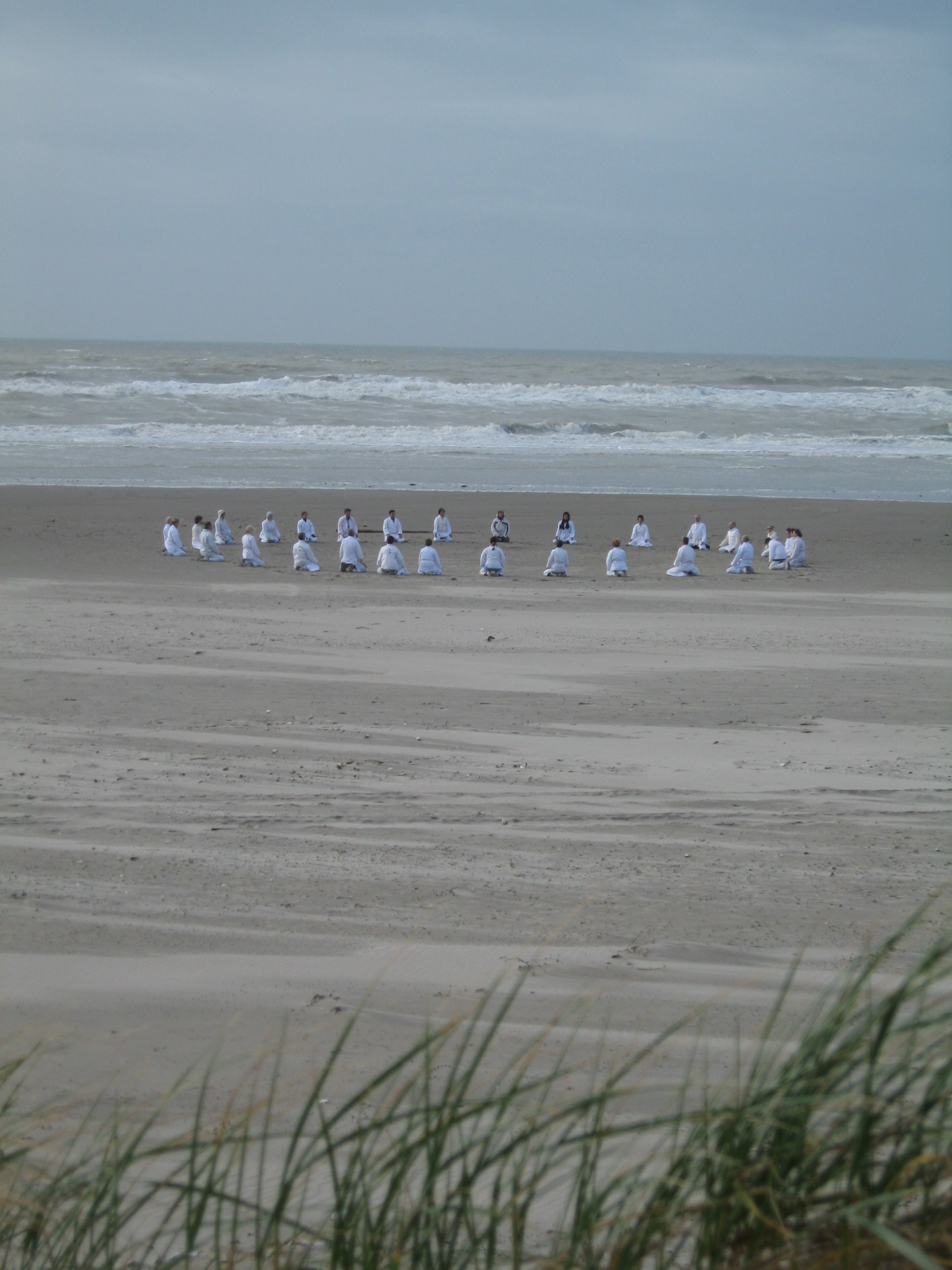
- a Shintaido gasshuku
- Also known as: New Body Way
- Country of origin: Japan
- Creator: Hiroyuki Aoki
- Parenthood: Karatedo, performing arts
- Official website: https://www.shintaido.org/ & http://shintaido-isc.org/

Shintaido (新体道, a Japanese word translated as ‘New Body Way’) is a system of movement which aims to use the body as a means of expression and communication. Incorporating both physical and artistic elements, it was created in Japan in the 1960s. Its roots lay in the traditional Japanese martial arts, Chinese medicine and Buddhist meditation techniques, while its creator Hiroyuki Aoki was also influenced by modern Western art and Christianity.

As well as being a practical martial art Shintaido aims to be a form of artistic expression, a healthy exercise, and a path of self-discovery and transformation.

Shintaido is practised with bare hands, but the curriculum also includes bojutsu (棒術), involving the use of the long staff (or bō, 棒), and kenjutsu (剣術), using a wooden sword (or bokuto, 木刀).

== Origins ==
=== Budō for the modern age ===
Hiroyuki Aoki's spiritual and artistic aspirations were not satisfied by karate as it existed in the 1960s. Striving to be called beautiful and have peace, he was searching for ‘both soft and expansive movement, spreading out to the ends of the earth – and power which could be used comfortably without turning against nature or the body.’

While studying karate under Shigeru Egami, he created his own research group which, as well as including karate practitioners, included others who had abandoned it as being too severe and unsparing, and also people with physical limitations. Then in 1964 he reached his goal of discovering a way of moving the body in a more natural, beautiful and effective manner. Yet he believed it might have taken a beginner 20 years of study to achieve this kind of movement. If it were to spearhead the new culture that he aspired for, Aoki realised that he needed system that could be learned relatively easily. He wanted to create an entire martial art that would convince the public at large – but one capable of revitalising both the body and the spirit, giving energy, refreshment and the hope of living a more colourful life, of restoring the soul day by day.

Aoki has said that he wanted to bring martial arts to the same level of attainment as the works of great Western artists such as Beethoven, Van Gogh or Dostoyevsky, or the American writers he admired, notably Henry Miller, Jackson Pollock or Walt Whitman.

=== Rakutenkai (楽天会) ===
To this end, on 23 September 1965, he collected an informal group around him which he called ‘Rakutenkai’, which had as its aim to pursue truth in daily life, acquire perfect liberty, live within the light of liberty, and become the light of the world. The only requirement was that members should practise with the group at least twice a year; among its members were active high-ranking martial artists, others who had given up their practice, women, children, old people and people with physical disabilities. Aoki wanted even the least strong people to be able to enjoy the fruits of his study even though the traditional processes of the martial arts tended to be selective and exclusive. From his own experience and careful study of the texts, Aoki believed that anyone, if properly supported, could reveal him- or herself as a ‘living treasure’. So he set the group five rules:

1. Stick to your own morality
2. Never forget your original self
3. Never judge others
4. Love your neighbour as yourself
5. -

(the last was left blank, to be filled in by each person according to their own beliefs).

From this group he chose a team of around 30 instructors to conduct deep research into technique. From their experimental practice, Hiroyuki Aoki selected certain movements and techniques, and introduced them into his new system. Three fundamental kata emerged during this period: Tenshingoso (which Aoki had created by April 1966), Eiko (which the Rakutenkai discovered during a late-night practice on 1 December 1966; and Hikari (see below). In 1970 he set up his own school, Sogobudo (holistic martial art) Renmei, to revive traditional Budō by developing and teaching Shintaido. After Rakutenkai had been disbanded a number of Aoki's leading practitioners and teachers, who had helped him create Shintaido, left the group. Among these were Master Egamis son Masatake Egami, Kato Tomorori, Hokari Shikoh and his brother, Ito Juguro, Toshima Shigeiko and Chieko Kato. With this passing much of the creative energy left the Shintaido organisation and practice.

== Claimed benefits ==
Shintaido assumes that the challenges facing modern people are more rooted in emotional and psychological matters than physical. Shintaido offers body movements that aim to build resources to live better and develop a new 'way of being' that is more intuitive, aware, and less tense; this stems from the belief that the freer the body, the more effective its movements can be.

The hope of founder Hiroyuki Aoki was to create a martial art that could reach the level of great art. so beauty and fluidity are essential aspects. The practice of Shintaido brings with it a bodily awareness and receptivity to the many messages the body transmits so that it can be used as a tool to explore the individual's inner state of being, evolution, limitations and resources. The partner exercises aim to provide an opportunity to discover and develop the ability to communicate and affirm oneself. The dojo (道場, practice space) is a place in which to explore this concept in safety.

== Basic forms ==
Every Shintaido practice begins with warming-up exercises designed to soften and extend the body until it can move naturally, without the tensions of everyday life. This may be followed by a period of more vigorous exercises, designed to open of the body. These exercises, like everything in Shintaido, are based on effective martial arts technique.

Most of these exercises can be practised alone, with a single partner or in a group; they can be performed dynamically, formally or slowly and meditatively. Some require use of the voice.

=== Tenshingoso (天真五相) ===
Tenshingoso (five expressions of cosmic truth) is one of the essential forms (or kata, 型) of Shintaido. Its significance can vary depending on the context in which it is performed. As a martial technique, it is a distillation of all the principal techniques (attacks, cuts and throws) of budō. As an artistic symbol, it is a metaphor of the life-cycle, from birth to death. As a technique of personal development, it is an encyclopedia of meditation positions (mudras).

=== Eiko (栄光) ===
Adapted from the art of swordsmanship, Eiko (glory) is a hymn to the glory of the human adventure, taking the practitioner between earth and heaven, ideal and reality. If done with conviction, it can bring practitioners out of their ‘small world’ and plunge them into a whirl of new sensations. To do Eiko is open up the space around and within oneself; with a partner, it develops a sense of timing, concentration and gives a chance to go far beyond one's normal limits.

=== Hikari (光) ===
Hikari (playing with light), though virtually indescribable, can be considered Shintaido's artistic masterpiece. It is a unique form of personal expression: its movements are totally free, so it has no form, and cannot be taught.

In Wakame taiso (わかめ体操, seaweed exercise) two people, face to face, alternately take the role of the seaweed and the ocean. The seaweed, rooted on the seabed, waves sinuously in response to the gentle touch of the ocean around it. This exercise can quickly induce a state of deep intensity. It also helps develop a sensitivity to attack and allows a fluid, centred response.

=== Taimyo (大妙) ===
A more recent form of the Shintaido kata, Taimyo (great mystery) was developed to allow older, less robust people or pregnant women to build up their strength and experience the Shintaido practice. A long and gentle kata, it contains elements of many aspects of Shintaido practice, has a therapeutic dimension, and builds a state of deep meditation.

== From relaxation and stretching to openness and freedom ==
The first objective of Shintaido is to make the body and mind relaxed, fluid and flexible. It then develops large movements through which practitioners express their vital energy and talents. Many exercises open the body, especially the hips, the stomach, chest and hands. Practitioners aim to develop an open spirit with which to approach life and other people. Kumite (組み手, partner practices) are used to test the effectiveness of the techniques learned: an open body, large movements and clear intention are said to make the techniques effective. There is no competition. Each participant is encouraged to express themselves freely and to discover their potential in a spirit of cooperation with, respect for and confidence in one another. A kumite may begin with a formal movement but is transformed progressively into a kind of free dance between two partners.

== Applied Shintaido ==
=== Shintaido bojutsu (新棒術) ===
The bojutsu curriculum is one of the most popular aspects of Shintaido, and for many people provided and point first contact. Students use a long staff (or bō, 棒) to extend their movement, and later progress to the more difficult short staff (or jō, 杖).

Beginners study a range of basic movements as well as three short kata which are based on traditional Japanese bojutsu practice. These kata are:

- Hino kata (火の型, kata of fire), derived from Sakugawa (佐久川)
- Kazeno kata (風の型, kata of wind), derived from Matsukaze (松風, the wind in the pines)
- Mizuno kata (水の型, kata of water), derived from Hakuson (白樽)

There is also a kumibo kata called shinjo (真常), offered in sho (小, correct, or formal) & dai (大, big, or expressive) forms.

Advanced students (from shodan and above) study the 3 long kata from which the basic kata were derived. At the highest level there is a longer kata (known colloquially as "Go Down Moses") in which all 3 kata are combined into a single form.

=== Shintaido karate (新空手) ===
The Shintaido karate curriculum is based on a cut down version of the shotokai karate curriculum, which is the school run by Egami sensei at the time Shintaido was created. The study of karate is meant to complement the study of Shintaido itself, and is most often taken up by Shintaido students of many years experience who wish to study the history and origins of Shintaido movement. Beginners study two taikyoku (太極) and two heian (平安) katas (each is offered in sho & dai forms) as well as variety of strikes, kicks and kumite arrangements. Advanced students (from shodan and above) study a range of traditional karate kata, culminating in a revisiting of the original taikyoku kata at the highest level.

== Curriculum and organisation ==
Shintaido offers five Dan (段, higher level) grades: currently just four people in the world hold the highest grade (5th Dan). On average it takes ten years of practice to reach 1st Dan (the grade of Shintaido instructor). Equivalent grades are also offered in the Shintaido forms of bojutsu & karate.

In Europe Kyu (級, lower level) examinations are conducted in each country. For 1st Dan and above, they are held at a European workshop organised by the European Shintaido College (ESC). Exams of 3rd Dan and above are held at international festivals held every four years at varying locations around the world.

The International Shintaido College (ISC) is the main organisation of Shintaido instructors. It meets every four years, when it also holds exams, of 3rd dan and above. Its Technical Committee (ISC-TC) comprises nine members, drawn from Shintaido's three regions: Europe, the Americas (including Australia) and Japan. This committee aims to harmonise practice and technique around the world.

Japan, the country of Shintaido's origin, has many instructors, most working within a national organisation (NPO). In the Western hemisphere, Shintaido is practised in USA, Canada and Brazil. The US instructors operate under the auspices of Shintaido of America. In Europe, The European Shintaido College (ESC) includes most of the Shintaido instructors in Europe, based in Germany, Belgium, Spain, France, Britain, Italy, the Czech Republic and Switzerland. ESC meets annually at a ‘forum’, when exams of 1st and 2nd Dan are also held. The European Technical Committee (ETC) oversees the examinations and establishes the curriculum for all examinations in Europe. Kyu grade exams can be held nationally or locally, twice a year.
