= 1973 European Karate Championships =

Karate competition

- Location: Valencia, Spain
- Dates: May 5 to 7
- Competitors: 210 from 14 nations

The 1975 European Karate Championships, the 8th edition, was held in Valencia, Spain from May 5 to 7, 1973.

== Medal table ==
* Host nation (Spain)

Rank	Nation	Gold	Silver	Bronze	Total
1	France	4	1	1	6
2	Scotland	1	1	0	2
3	Great Britain	0	1	1	2
3	Netherlands	0	1	1	2
5	Switzerland	0	1	0	1
6	Italy	0	0	3	3
6	West Germany	0	0	3	3
8	Spain*	0	0	1	1
Totals (8 entries)		5	5	10	20

== Competition ==
Event	Gold	Silver	Bronze
Kumite -65 kg	(France) Roger Paschy	(United Kingdom) Steve Cattle	(Germany) Richard Scherer (Italy) Paolo Ciotoli
Kumite -75 kg	(France) Christian Alifax	(Netherlands) William Millerson	(United Kingdom) Billy Higgins (Italy) Giorgio Schiappagasse
Kumite -80 kg	(France) François Petitdemange	(Scotland) Robin McFarlane	(France) Gerard Boukhezer (Netherlands) Tom Van Heuman
Kumite Open	(France) Francis Didier	(France) Patrice Lenoir	(Spain) Alfonso Rivilla (West Germany) Willy Voss

=== Team ===
Event	Gold	Silver	Bronze
Kumite	Scotland	Switzerland	West Germany; Italy
