= Reeberg =

Reeberg is a surname. Notable people with the surname include:

- John Reeberg (born 1947), Dutch-Surinamese karateka
- Lucien Reeberg (1942–1964), American football offensive tackle
