= Jan Kallenbach =

Dutch martial artist (c.1943–2021)

Jan Kallenbach (c. 1943 – 14 April 2021) was a Dutch martial artist. He was a 7th Dan teacher of Taikiken, a Japanese off-shoot of Yiquan and had a significant history in Full contact Karate (Kyokushin-Kaikan). Veteran Kyokushin practitioners from Japan considered Kallenbach as one of the most dominant foreign fighters during the style's early stages in 1960s and 1970s.

== Background ==
Kallenbach was born in Amsterdam in 1943. He was first introduced to the Dutch branch of Kyokushin Karate while still practising Judo. He first started Kyokushin Karate under Jon Bluming, the Dutch branch chief. Kallenbach worked as an assistant instructor at the Jon Bluming's "Budokai", and was also a member of the Karate Technical College of the N.K.A.

In 1966, Kallenbach witnessed the strength of Kenji Kurosaki, who was instructing there and decided to move to train at the main Kyokushin Dojo. He moved to Japan in 1967.

Kallenbach practiced with a positive attitude. However, his great physical strength made him a difficult sparring partner for other students, causing headaches to the instructors. The only person who could contain Kallenbach was Noboru Osawa, who was in charge of the Narimasu branch while Kenji Kurosaki was travelling to Europe. Kallenbach was pleased to have gotten such a sparring partner .

After a while, Kallenbach began to want to experience something of more depth in Karate, as he grew weary of repetitive practice sessions. Hatsuo Royama, who was recently banned from Kyokushin, due to an incident involving Kallenbach, had started to study Taikiken under Kenichi Sawai. After Royama had told about Taikike, Kallenbach became interested and asked Royama to introduce him to Sawai. After that, he left the Kyokushin Kaikan and started practicing Taikiken under Sawai. Kallenbach continued to practice the style until he died in April 2021.

== Fighting style ==
During the Kyokushin Kaikan era, he held himself half-body, aimed at his face, took advantage of his height, and hit one-two and straight with speed. Even if approached from the rear, he was able to hit everyone with his foot-sweep attack and lunged across the mat.

Kallenbach competed in the European Karate Championships during 1970s. In 1972 European Karate Championships, he would take silver in "Kumite - 80 kg" class. He would win gold in 1974 European Karate Championships in "Kumite + 78 kg" class.

== Anecdotes ==
Various experts praised Kallenbach's skill. Shigeo Kato said "The best foreign fighter would be Kallenbach. It would have been really interesting if he [had remained with Kyokushin]. It was hard to deal with. Fujihira and I were small, so we had to jump kick at him. Kallenbach was good at performing his skills according to the opponent's breathing. He was also a smart researcher. His right straight and foot sweep beat everyone."

Hatsuo Royama said that Kallenbach "had the strength that transcended the rules of the game. If I were a to pick best foreign Karateka of all time, then Kallenbach would be the number one."

Terutomo Yamazaki noted, "Kallenbach did not ride on any deception, but calmly used his physical strength to fight. He was the first opponent for me to feel the difference in physical strength, and I always wondered how I could stand fight with such a large person." Yamazaki also cited his experiences with Kallenbach helped him when training Kyokushin to larger fighters.

== Achievements ==
- 1972 European Karate Championships, Kumite - 80 kg, Silver
- 1974 European Karate Championships, Kumite + 78 kg, Gold
