= Tetsuji Murakami =

Karate master and teacher

- Born: March 31, 1927; Shizuoka, Japan
- Died: 24 January 1987 (aged 59)
- Nationality: Japanese
- Style: Karate
- Rank: 10th dan Shotokan Karate

Other information
- Notable students: Vernon Bell, Henry Plée, Ilija Jorga

Tetsuji Murakami (Japanese: 村上 哲次; March 31, 1927 – 24 January 1987) was an early Japanese karate representative to Europe.

== Early life ==
He was born in Shizuoka Prefecture, Japan, in 1927. When he turned nineteen, he started learning Karate-do under Masaji Yamagushi, a student of Gichin Funakoshi. He trained for ten years, also learning the styles of kendo, aikido and iaido.

== Europe ==
In 1957, he was invited to France by Henry Plée of the French Martial Arts Academy. In 1959, he was invited to Italy by Vladimiro Malatesti. By 1960, his skills and charisma had begun to draw a following of the top students in Europe. His influence progressively expanded to Germany, England, Yugoslavia, Algeria, Portugal, and Switzerland. In 1968, he traveled back to Japan where he trained with Shigeru Egami.

Influenced by Egami, Murakami improved his techniques, integrating a technique called irimi. Using what he observed, he decided to make a profound transformation in his technique and practice. He returned to Europe as the representative of the style Shotokai. His students included Louis Carvalho, Patrick Herbert, Antonio Maltoni, Borko Jovanovic, Pierre-John Boyer, on Portugal; Mário Rebola, Alexandre Gueifão, Raul Cerveira e Leopoldo Ferreira. and José Ivo Pinto Mendes, who taught Shotokai in Panama City.

Tetsuji Murakami died in 1987 in Paris.
