= DKV =

DKV may refer to:

- Danske Kvindeforeningers Valgsretsudvalg (Danish Women's Society's Suffrage Committee), later Danske Kvindeforeningers Valgretsforbund
- Debreceni Közlekedési Vállalat, provider of public transport in Debrecen, Hungary
- Deutscher Karate Verband German Karate Federation
- DKV Deutsche Krankenversicherung, German insurance company, part of the Ergo Group
- DKV Euro Service (de), German B2B mobility service provider, originally Deutscher Kraftverkehr (German motor transport), part of the DKV Mobility Services Group
