= 1978 European Karate Championships =

Karate competition

- Location: Geneva, Switzerland
- Dates: May 18 to 21

The 1978 European Karate Championships, the 13th edition, was held in Geneva, Switzerland from May 19 to 21, 1978.

== Competition ==
Event	Gold	Silver	Bronze
Kumite -65 kg	(Scotland) David Coulter	(Austria) Felix Traintinger	(France) Serge Chouraqui (France) Laurent Saidane
Kumite -70 kg	(United Kingdom) Michael Jerome	(United Kingdom) Alfie Borg	(Finland) Olavi Tuovinen (Spain) Damian Gonzalez
Kumite -75 kg	(France) Christian Gauze	(Italy) Franco Paganini	(Scotland) Gene Dunnett (Spain) Antonio Martínez Amillo
Kumite -80 kg	(France) Sylvain Renaud	(Netherlands) Otti Roethof	(United Kingdom) Stanley Knighton (Spain) Juan Pedro Carbila
Kumite + 80 kg	(United Kingdom) Eugene Codrington	(United Kingdom) Nirmans Prince	(Netherlands) John Reeberg (Italy) Massimo Di Luigi
Open Kumite	(Netherlands) John Reeberg	(United Kingdom) Victor Charles	(Sweden) Hakan Nygren (France) Patrice Belrhiti

=== Team ===
Event	Gold	Silver	Bronze
Kumite	Netherlands	United Kingdom	France; Wales
