= Deutscher JKA-Karate Bund =

Karate association

Deutscher JKA-Karate Bund e.V.
- Abbreviation: DJKB
- Formation: 1993
- Type: Sports federation
- Members: Japan Karate Association
- Official language: German
- Chief Instructor: Hideo Ochi
- Website: https://www.djkb.com/

The Deutsche JKA-Karate Bund was created 1993 by Hideo Ochi as the German branch of the Japan Karate Association (JKA).

The reason for the founding of the Deutsche JKA-Karate Bund were disagreements with the Deutscher Karate Verband about the importance of the traditional values of Shōtōkan karate.

Today the Deutsche JKA-Karate Bund is an independent and not with the German Olympic Sports Confederation affiliated confederation with more than 21000 members and 450 dojos and clubs.
