= 1974 European Karate Championships =

Karate competition

1973 European Karate Championships
- Location: London, United Kingdom
- Dates: May 5 to 7
- Competitors: 130 from 15 nations

The 1974 European Karate Championships, the 7th edition of the European Karate Championships, was held in London, England, from May 2 to 4, 1974.

== Medal table ==
* Host nation (Great Britain)

Rank	Nation	Gold	Silver	Bronze	Total
1	France	1	2	0	3
2	Great Britain*	1	0	2	3
3	Netherlands	1	0	1	2
3	West Germany	1	0	1	2
5	Scotland	1	0	0	1
6	Belgium	0	2	1	3
7	Spain	0	1	0	1
8	Switzerland	0	0	3	3
9	Italy	0	0	1	1
9	Sweden	0	0	1	1
Totals (10 entries)		5	5	10	20

== Competition ==
Event	Gold	Silver	Bronze
Kumite -68 kg	(West Germany) Richard Scherer	(Spain) Antonio Oliva	(Belgium) Michel Bonhomme (Switzerland) Jacques Bonvin
Kumite -78 kg	(United Kingdom) Billy Higgins	(Belgium) Geert Lemmens	(Sweden) John-Eric Kronas (Switzerland) Jean-Claude Knupfer
Kumite + 78 kg	(Scotland) Robin McFarlane	(France) François Petitdemange	(United Kingdom) Brian Fitkin (Netherlands) John Reeberg
Kumite Open	(Netherlands) Jan Kallenbach	(France) Jean-Luc Mami	(United Kingdom) Steve O'Gready (Italy) Lino La Cassia

=== Team ===
Event	Gold	Silver	Bronze
Kumite	France	Belgium	West Germany; Switzerland
