= 1969 European Karate Championships =

Karate competition

- Venue: Crystal Palace
- Location: London, United Kingdom
- Dates: 2 to 4 May
- Competitors: 117 from 13 nations

The 1969 European Karate Championships, the 4th edition, was held in the sports complex of Crystal Palace in London, England, from 2 to 4 May 1969.

== Medal table ==
* Host nation (Great Britain)

Rank	Nation	Gold	Silver	Bronze	Total
1	France	2	1	0	3
2	Great Britain*	0	1	0	1
3	Yugoslavia	0	0	2	2
4	Belgium	0	0	1	1
4	West Germany	0	0	1	1
Totals (5 entries)		2	2	4	8

== Medalists ==
Event	Gold	Silver	Bronze
Ippon	Dominique Valera; France	Gilbert Gruss; France	Ilija Jorga; Yugoslavia
Ippon	Dominique Valera; France	Gilbert Gruss; France	Richard Scherer; West Germany
Team	France	United Kingdom	Yugoslavia; Belgium
