= Parole de flic =

- Directed by: José Pinheiro
- Written by: Philippe Setbon, Frédéric H. Fajardie
- Screenplay by: Alain Delon; Frédéric H. Fajardie; José Pinheiro
- Produced by: Alain Delon
- Cinematography: Richard Andry, Jean-Jacques Tarbès
- Edited by: Claire Pinheiro
- Music by: Pino Marchese
- Production company: Adel
- Distributed by: UGC Distribution
- Release date: 21 August 1985
- Running time: 98 minutes
- Country: France
- Language: French

Parole de flic is a 1985 French crime film directed by José Pinheiro and produced by and starring Alain Delon. It marked Delon's return to action films after a period devoted to more intimate films.

Ne réveillez pas un flic qui dort (1988) was the sequel to this film.

== Plot ==
Daniel Pratt (Alain Delon) is a former police officer living on an African island. When he learns that his daughter has been murdered in Lyon, he returns to France to avenge her, and brutally kills the perpetrators one by one.

== Cast ==
- Alain Delon: Daniel Pratt
- Jacques Perrin: Stéphane Reiner
- Fiona Gélin: Sabine Clément
- Éva Darlan: Dominique Reiner
- Jean-François Stévenin: Sylvain Dubor
- Stéphane Ferrara: Abel Salem
- Vincent Lindon: Dax
- Dominique Valera: Brice
- Jean-Yves Chatelais: Remy

== Production ==
Philippe Setbon was the initial scriptwriter, but left the project before completion; the final script was written by Frédéric H. Fajardie and edited by Pinheiro and Delon. Shooting took place in and around Lyons, and in the People's Republic of Congo for African scenes.

The song "I Don't Know", played over the closing credits, is sung by Alain Delon and Phyllis Nelson.

Stéphane Ferrara, who had previously appeared in Jean-Luc Godard's Détective, was a French national champion in boxing.

== Release ==
Parole de flic was released in France on 21 August 1985. The film was also released as Cop's Honour in the United Kingdom in 1987, and as Hot Gun in the Philippines on 22 May 1987.

=== Reception ===
Parole de flic was a big hit in France, with admissions of 2,517,875.
