= 1970 European Karate Championships =

Karate competition

- Location: Hamburg, West Germany
- Dates: May 5 to 7
- Competitors: 119 from 14 nations

The 1970 European Karate Championships, the 5th edition, was held in Hamburg, Germany from May 5 to 7, 1970.

== Medal table ==
* Host nation (West Germany)

Rank	Nation	Gold	Silver	Bronze	Total
1	France	1	2	1	4
2	West Germany*	1	0	0	1
3	Great Britain	0	0	2	2
Totals (3 entries)		2	2	3	7

== Medalists ==
Event	Gold	Silver	Bronze
Ippon	Dominique Valera; France	Gilbert Gruss; France	Geert Lemmens; Belgium
Ippon	Dominique Valera; France	Gilbert Gruss; France	Billy Higgins; Great Britain
Team	West Germany	France	United Kingdom; Yugoslavia
