= Hideo Ochi =

Japanese karateka

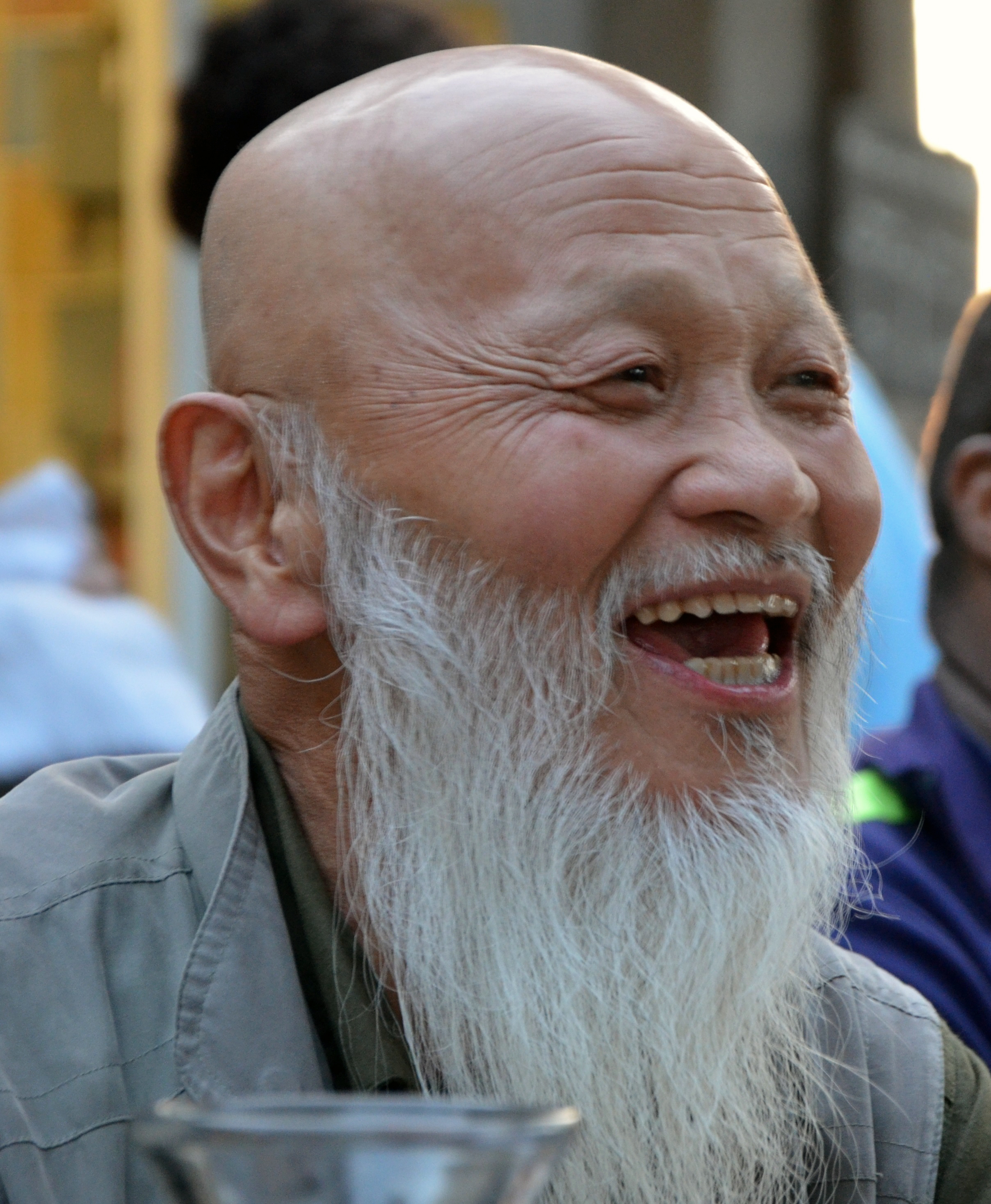
- Hideo Ochi (2012)
- Born: 29 February 1940 (age 85); Saijō, Japan
- Style: Shotokan Karate
- Rank: 9th Dan Karate JKA

Other information
- Website: http://www.karate-ochi.de/

Hideo Ochi (born February 29, 1940, in Saijō, Japan) is a Japanese master of karate. He is ranked 9th Dan, and is a former Japan Karate Association (JKA) World Champion in kumite (sparring) and kata (patterns). He was also coach (European Championship in 1971, 1972 and 1975) of the German national team and Chief Instructor for JKA Europe. In 1997, he received the Order of Merit of the Federal Republic of Germany.

== Biography ==
Ochi began his Shotokan karate training at the age of 14.

As a student of economics at Takushoku University, he was a member of its karate team and due to his success as a competitor he consequently applied as instructor for the JKA. He passed all the tests, and in 1964 the JKA made him instructor for the honbu dojo (headquarters training hall) in Tokyo.

During the following years, he was champion of Japan several times. Because of his victories in kata and kumite from 1966 to 1969 he eventually achieved the title "Grand Champion".

=== Germany ===
In 1970, Hideo Ochi took over the position of National Karate trainer in Germany. Under his guidance, the German national team won the European Championships three times. After they had placed second in the world championship in Los Angeles 1977, the very next year he competed himself once again during his holidays in Japan, defeated 1976's World champion Osaka, and won the National championship of his home country Japan.

In 1993, he founded the DJKB (Deutscher JKA-Karate Bund) as German branch of the JKA.

In 2016, he was awarded 9th dan.

Ochi is the successor of Keinosuke Enoeda as Chief Instructor for JKA Europe.

He has been invited to participate in other karate organizations international events, such as the ISKF Master Camp, placed in Philadelphia, US every year. In 2011 he gave his belt -which was almost white- to a boy blackbelt from Venezuela, when he asked Master Ochi for a picture for his birthday. Now, he is wearing a new black belt.
