= 1975 European Karate Championships =

Karate competitions

- Location: Ostend, Belgium
- Dates: May 2 to 4
- Competitors: 21 from 260 nations

The 1975 European Karate Championships, the 10th edition, was held in Ostend, Belgium from May 5 to 7, 1975.

== Medal table ==
* Host nation (Belgium)

Rank	Nation	Gold	Silver	Bronze	Total
1	France	3	0	3	6
2	Great Britain	2	0	1	3
3	Netherlands	0	2	0	2
4	West Germany	0	1	2	3
5	Switzerland	0	1	1	2
6	Wales	0	1	0	1
7	Belgium*	0	0	1	1
7	Italy	0	0	1	1
7	Scotland	0	0	1	1
Totals (9 entries)		5	5	10	20

== Medalists ==
Event	Gold	Silver	Bronze
Kumite -65 kg	(France) Roger Paschy	(West Germany) Willy Voss	(Switzerland) Jacques Bonvin (Belgium) Marc Soli
Kumite -75 kg	(United Kingdom) Billy Higgins	(Netherlands) William Millerson	(France) Christian Alifax (West Germany) Wolfgang Ziebart
Kumite -80 kg	(United Kingdom) Eugene Codrington	(Netherlands) John Reeberg	(United Kingdom) Brian Fitkin (France) Dominique Valera
Kumite Open	(France) Jacques Abdurraman	(Wales) Von Johnson	(Italy) Pasquale La Cassia (France) Dominique Valera

=== Team ===
Event	Gold	Silver	Bronze
Kumite	France	Switzerland	West Germany; Scotland
