= 1967 European Karate Championships =

Karate competition

- Venue: Crystal Palace
- Location: London, United Kingdom
- Dates: May 2 to 4
- Competitors: 70 from 10 nations

The 1967 European Karate Championships, the 2nd edition, was held in the sports complex of Crystal Palace in London, England, from May 2 to 4, 1967.

== Medal table ==
* Host nation (Great Britain)

Rank	Nation	Gold	Silver	Bronze	Total
1	France	1	2	0	3
2	Great Britain*	1	0	1	2
3	Italy	0	0	1	1
3	Switzerland	0	0	1	1
3	West Germany	0	0	1	1
Totals (5 entries)		2	2	4	8

== Medalists ==
Event	Gold	Silver	Bronze
Ippon	Patrick Baroux; France	Guy Desnoes; France	Henri Jordan; Switzerland
Ippon	Patrick Baroux; France	Guy Desnoes; France	Peter Spanton; Great Britain
Team	United Kingdom	France	West Germany; Italy
