= José Pinheiro (director) =

French film director, editor and writer (born 1945)

- Born: 13 June 1945 (age 80); Paris, France
- Occupation: Director
- Years active: 1969-2012

José Pinheiro (born 13 June 1945) is a French film director, editor and writer.

== Filmography ==
=== Film ===
Year	Title	Director	Writer
1982	Family Rock	Yes	Yes
1983	Les mots pour le dire	Yes	Yes
1985	Parole de flic	Yes	Yes
1986	Les roses de Matmata	Yes	No
1987	My True Love, My Wound	Yes	Yes
1988	Let Sleeping Cops Lie	Yes	Yes
1990	La Femme fardée	Yes	Yes
1998	Toda a Gente Sabe que te Amo (Short)	Yes	No

Editor

- Jan Palach (1969) (Documentary)
- Macédoine (1971)
- Pink Floyd: Live at Pompeii (1972) (Documentary)
- Les petites saintes y touchent (1974) (Assistant editor)
- Cher Victor (1975)
- Tchad 2: L'ultimatum (1975) (Documentary)
- Tchad 3 (1976) (Documentary)
- Le coeur froid (1977)
- The Police War (1979)

Assistant director

- La philosophie dans le boudoir (1969)

=== Television ===
Year	Title	Notes
1988	Sueurs froides	1 episode
1992	Maigret	1 episode
1992	EuroRitmias	1 episode
1994	Madame le proviseur	3 episodes
1997-1999	Made in Portugal	3 episodes
1997-2005	Navarro	8 episodes
1998-1999	L'instit	3 episodes
1999	Les Monos	1 episode
2002	Fabio Montale	Miniseries
2002	Alex Santana, négociateur	1 episode
2004-2008	Le tuteur	5 episodes
2005-2006	Commissaire Moulin	4 episodes
2009	Enquêtes réservées	2 episodes

TV movies

- Les beaux dimanches (1980)
- La petite absente (2000)
- Le lion (2003)
- Ne meurs pas (2003)
- L'étrangère (2007)
- Mort prématurée (2007)
- Un Vrai Papa Noël (2008)
- Les fauves (2012)
