= Kotzebue (disambiguation) =

Kotzebue may refer to:

== Surname ==
- Kotzebue (noble family), Baltic German and Russian noble family
- Alexander von Kotzebue (1815–1889), German-Russian Romantic painter, son of August von Kotzebue
- August von Kotzebue (1761–1819), German dramatist and writer
- Ludwig Kotzebue (born 1946), Dutch-Surinamese karateka
- Otto von Kotzebue (1787–1846), Baltic German navigator, son of August von Kotzebue
- Paul Demetrius von Kotzebue (1801–1884), Baltic German officer, son of August von Kotzebue
- Lidia Kotzebue (1885-1944) Romanian-Russian architect and sculptor; see Monument to the Heroes of the Air

== Places in the United States ==
- Kotzebue, Alaska
- Kotzebue Sound, Alaska
- Kotzebue Air Force Station, Alaska

== See also ==
- Kitzbühel
