= Stéphane Ferrara =

French actor and former boxer

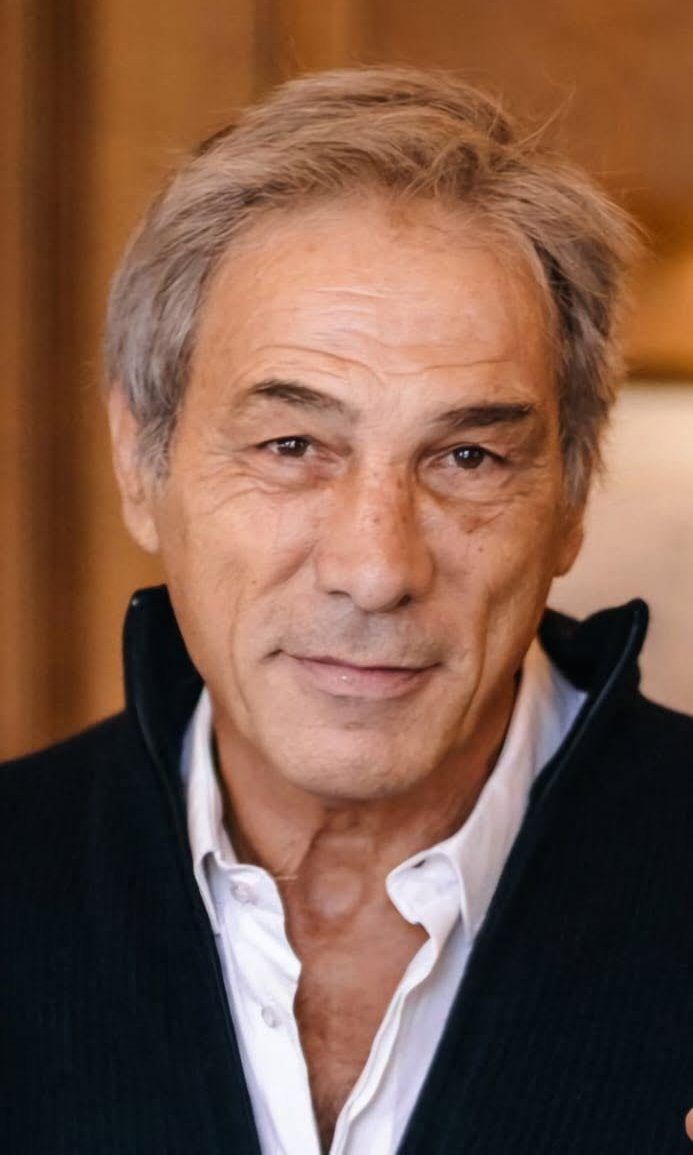
- Born: 25 December 1956 (age 69)
- Occupation: Actor
- Years active: 1982–present

Stéphane Ferrara (born 25 December 1956) is a French actor and boxer. He appeared in more than sixty films since 1982.

== Selected filmography ==
Year	Title	Role	Notes
1983	Édith et Marcel		
1985	Détective		
1985	Parole de flic		
1987	My True Love, My Wound (Mon bel amour, ma déchirure)		
1988	The Kiss of the Tiger		
1988	Domino	Paul Du Lac	
1989	Disperatamente Giulia		
1991	Paprika		
2002	The Code		
2017	Let The Corpses Tan		
