= Eugene Codrington =

British karateka (born 1953)

- Born: 5 November 1953 (age 72); Hope Bay, Jamaica
- Style: Wadō-ryū Karate
- Teacher: Toru Takamizawa
- Rank: 8th Dan

Eugene Codrington (born 5 November 1953) is a British karateka. He has an 8th Dan black belt in karate and is the winner of multiple European Karate Championships and was part of first non- Japanese team to win a World Karate Championships. Eugene is a founder member of the English Karate Governing Board (EKGB) for whom he is Senior Coach.

Eugene Codrington was born in Hope Bay, Portland, Jamaica in 1953. Having settled in the UK at an early age, Eugene showed an exceptional aptitude for sport and physical activity and was a keen competitor in many sports as a young man. He began his Karate training at the legendary Temple Dojo in Birmingham under the tutelage of Takamizawa Sensei (Toru) in 1969. After 2½ years of diligent training Eugene was award his 1st Dan black belt. Already a keen competition fighter Eugene began to win competitions all over the country and in 1974, Eugene won his first of five European championships, then 11 years later, in April 1985; he was collecting his fifth British Championship trophy. He was World Champion as a member of the British Team who beat the Japanese for the first time ever in 1975, and a finalist in the world individual Championships two years later in Tokyo.

== Achievements ==
- 1975 European Karate Championships Kumite Gold Medal
- 1978 European Karate Championships Kumite Gold Medal
- 1975 World Karate Championships Team Kumite Gold Medal
- 1977 World Karate Championships Kumite Silver Medal
