= Armenian Shotokan Karate Federation =

Sporting Organization

Armenian Shotokan Karate Federation logo

The Armenian Shotokan Karate Federation (Armenian: Հայաստանի շոտոկան կարատեի ֆեդերացիա), is the regulating body of Shotokan karate in Armenia, governed by the Armenian Olympic Committee. The headquarters of the federation is located in Yerevan.

== History ==
The Armenian Shotokan Karate Federation is currently led by president Grigor Mikhayelyan, who is also the president of the Karate Federation of Armenia. Armenian shotokan karate athletes participate in various international shotokan championships, the Federation also hosts national level competitions. The Federation is a full member of the World Traditional Okinawa Karate-Do Federation.

== See also ==
- Armenian Kyokushin Karate Federation
- Sport in Armenia
