= My True Love, My Wound =

- Directed by: José Pinheiro
- Written by: Louis Calaferte; José Pinheiro; Sotha
- Produced by: Yannick Bernard
- Starring: Stéphane Ferrara; Catherine Wilkening
- Cinematography: Richard Andry
- Music by: Romano Musumarra
- Distributed by: BAC Films
- Release date: 17 June 1987
- Running time: 1h 30min
- Country: France
- Language: French

My True Love, My Wound (French: Mon bel amour, ma déchirure) is a 1987 French drama film directed by José Pinheiro.

== Cast ==
- Stéphane Ferrara - Patrick
- Catherine Wilkening - Catherine
- Véra Gregh - The director
- Véronique Barrault - Clementine
- Jacques Castaldo - Jean-Ba
- Philippe Manesse - Julien
- Jacky Sigaux - Jacky
- Mouss Diouf - Mouss
