= Armenian Kyokushin Karate Federation =

Sporting Organization

Armenian Kyokushin Karate Federation logo

The Armenian Kyokushin Karate Federation (Armenian: Հայաստանի Կիոկուշին կարատեի ֆեդերացիա), is the regulating body of kyokushin karate in Armenia, governed by the Armenian Olympic Committee. The headquarters of the federation is located in Yerevan.

== History ==
The Armenian Kyokushin Karate Federation was established in 2005 and is currently led by president Andranik Hakobyan. Armenian kyokushin karate athletes participate in various European and international kyokushin championships, the Federation also hosts national level competitions and operates several kyokushin clubs throughout the country. The Federation has twice organized the "Kyokushin World Union European Championships" in Yerevan, the first in 2012 and the second in 2018, which was attended by over 700 athletes from 27 countries. The Federation is a full member of the International Kyokushin Karate Organization and the Kyokushin World Union, within the European Division.

== See also ==
- Armenian Shotokan Karate Federation
- Karate Federation of Armenia
- Sport in Armenia
