= Gigō Funakoshi =

Japanese karateka

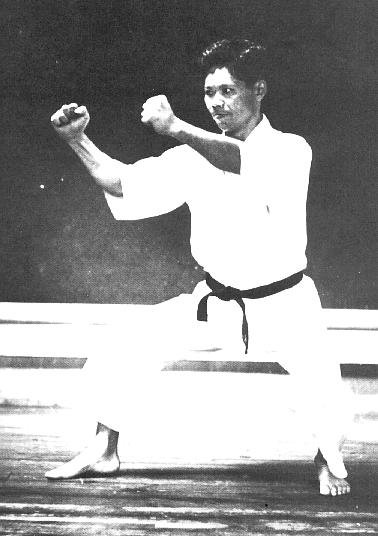
- Gigō Funakoshi
- Born: 1906; Okinawa, Empire of Japan
- Died: 24 November 1945 (aged 39); Tokyo, Allied-occupied Japan
- Native name: 船越義豪
- Other names: Yoshitaka, waka sensei
- Style: Shotokan, Shotokai, kendo, Iaido
- Teachers: Gichin Funakoshi (his father), Takeshi Shimoda
- Rank: successor waka (後継者) sensei to his father

Other information
- Notable students: Mitsusuke Harada, Taiji Kase, Won Kuk Lee, Mas Oyama, Tomosaburo Okano, Shigeru Egami, Genshin Hironishi, Masatoshi Nakayama, Motokuni Sugiura, Hidetaka Nishiyama, Tadao Okuyama

Gigō Funakoshi (Japanese: 船越義豪, Hepburn: Funakoshi Gigō, Funakoshi Yoshitaka) (1906 – 24 November 1945) was the third son of Gichin Funakoshi (the founder of Shotokan karate) and is widely credited with developing the foundation of the modern karate Shōtōkan style.

== Early years ==
Gigō Funakoshi was born in Okinawa and diagnosed with tuberculosis at the age of seven. He was sickly as a child and began the formal study of karatedō at the age of twelve as a means to improve his health. In the early years, Gichin Funakoshi often took Gigō with him to his trainings with Ankō Itosu. Gigō moved from Okinawa to Tokyo to his father when he was 17, and later became a radiographer of the Section of Physical and Medical Consultation of the Ministry of Education.

== Career ==
When his father's senior assistant instructor Takeshi Shimoda died, Gigō assumed his position within the Shotokan organization teaching in various universities. Gichin Funakoshi transformed karate from a purely self-defense fighting technique to a philosophical martial Dō (way of life), or gendai budo, but his son Gigō began to develop a karate technique that definitively separated Japanese karatedō from the local Okinawan arts. Between 1936 and 1945, Gigō gave it a completely different and powerful Japanese flavor based on his study of modern kendo (the way of the japanese sword), and Iaido (the way of drawing the Japanese sword) under sensei Nakayama Hakudō. Gigō's work on Japanese Karate development was primarily popularized by masters Shigeru Egami and Genshin Hironishi, who later formed the Shotokai karate style

== Changes in style ==
Through his teaching position and understanding of Japanese martial arts, Gigō became the technical creator of modern Shōtōkan karate. In 1946 the book Karate Do Nyumon by Gigō and Gichin Funakoshi was released. Gigo had written the technical part, whereas his father Gichin wrote the preamble and historical parts.

While the ancient arts of To-de and shuri-te emphasized the use and development of the upper body, open hand attacks, short distances, joint locks, basic grappling, pressure point striking and use of the front kick and variations of it, Gigō developed long distance striking techniques using the low stances found in old style kendo and Iaido kata. Gigō also developed higher kicks including mawashi geri (round kick), yoko geri kekomi (thrusting side kick), yoko geri keage (side snap kick), fumikiri (cutting side kick directed to soft targets), ura mawashi geri (quarter rotation front-round kick—though some credit Kase-sensei with the creation of this technique) and ushiro geri kekomi (thrusting back kick). Yoshitaka was especially known for his deep stances and kicking techniques, and he introduced fudo dachi (rooted stance/immovable stance), yoko geri (side kick), and mae geri (front kick) forms to the Shōtōkan style. All these techniques became part of the already large arsenal brought from the ancient Okinawan styles. Another big changement of Gigō was the introduction of the Kiba Dachi instead of Shiko Dachi and implementing the Kokutsu Dachi (which he took from Japanese classical fencing or "kenjutsu") instead of Neko Ashi Dachi stance in Shōtōkan Kata.

Gigō's kicking techniques were performed with a much higher knee-lift than in previous styles, and the use of the hips was emphasized. Other technical developments included the turning of the torso to a half-facing position (hanmi) when blocking, and thrusting the rear leg and hips when performing the techniques. These adaptations allowed the delivery of a penetrating attack with the whole body through correct body alignment. Gigō also promoted free sparring.

Gigō's kumite (fighting) style was to strike hard and fast, using low stances and long attacks, chained techniques and foot sweeps (taken from old style Kendō and Judō). Integration of these changes into the Shotokan style immediately separated Shotokan from Okinawan karate. Gigō also emphasized the use of oi tsuki (lunge punch) and gyaku tsuki (reverse lunge punch). The training sessions in his dōjō were exhausting, and during these, Gigō expected his students to give twice as much energy as they would put into a real confrontation. He expected this over-training would prepare them for an actual combat situation, should it arise.

== Final years ==
The difficult living conditions of World War II weakened Gigō, but he continued training. He died of tuberculosis at the age of 39 on 24 November 1945, in Tōkyō, Japan.

== See also ==
- Shōtōkai
- Gichin Funakoshi
- kendo
- Iaido
- shotokan
