= 1977 World Karate Championships =

Karate competition

- Host city: Tokyo, Japan
- Dates: 21–22 April
- Main venue: Nippon Budokan

The 1977 World Karate Championships are the 4th edition of the World Karate Championships, and were held in Nippon Budokan, Tokyo, Japan in 1977.

== Medalists ==
Event	Gold	Silver	Bronze
Individual	Otti Roethof; Netherlands	Eugene Codrington; Great Britain	Juan Pedro Carbilla; Spain
Individual	Otti Roethof; Netherlands	Eugene Codrington; Great Britain	Chen Chien; Taiwan
Team	Netherlands	West Germany	France
Team	Netherlands	West Germany	Iran

== Medal table ==
Rank	Nation	Gold	Silver	Bronze	Total
1	Netherlands	2	0	0	2
2	Great Britain	0	1	0	1
2	West Germany	0	1	0	1
4	France	0	0	1	1
4	Iran	0	0	1	1
4	Spain	0	0	1	1
4	Taiwan	0	0	1	1
Totals (7 entries)		2	2	4	8
