= Vernon Bell =

British martial artist

- Born: Vernon Cecil Frederick Bell; 10 October 1922; Ilford, Essex, England
- Died: 27 February 2004 (aged 81)
- Nationality: British
- Style: Karate, Judo, Jujutsu,
- Teacher(s): Henry Plée (Karate); Kenshiro Abbe (Judo)
- Rank: 10th dan Yoseikan Karate; 5th dan Judo; 10th dan Jujutsu
- Father of British Karate

Vernon Cecil Frederick Bell (10 October 1922 – 27 February 2004) is often credited as "the father of British karate."

Bell was taught karate by Henry Plée and brought karate to Great Britain.
