= John Reeberg =

Dutch karateka

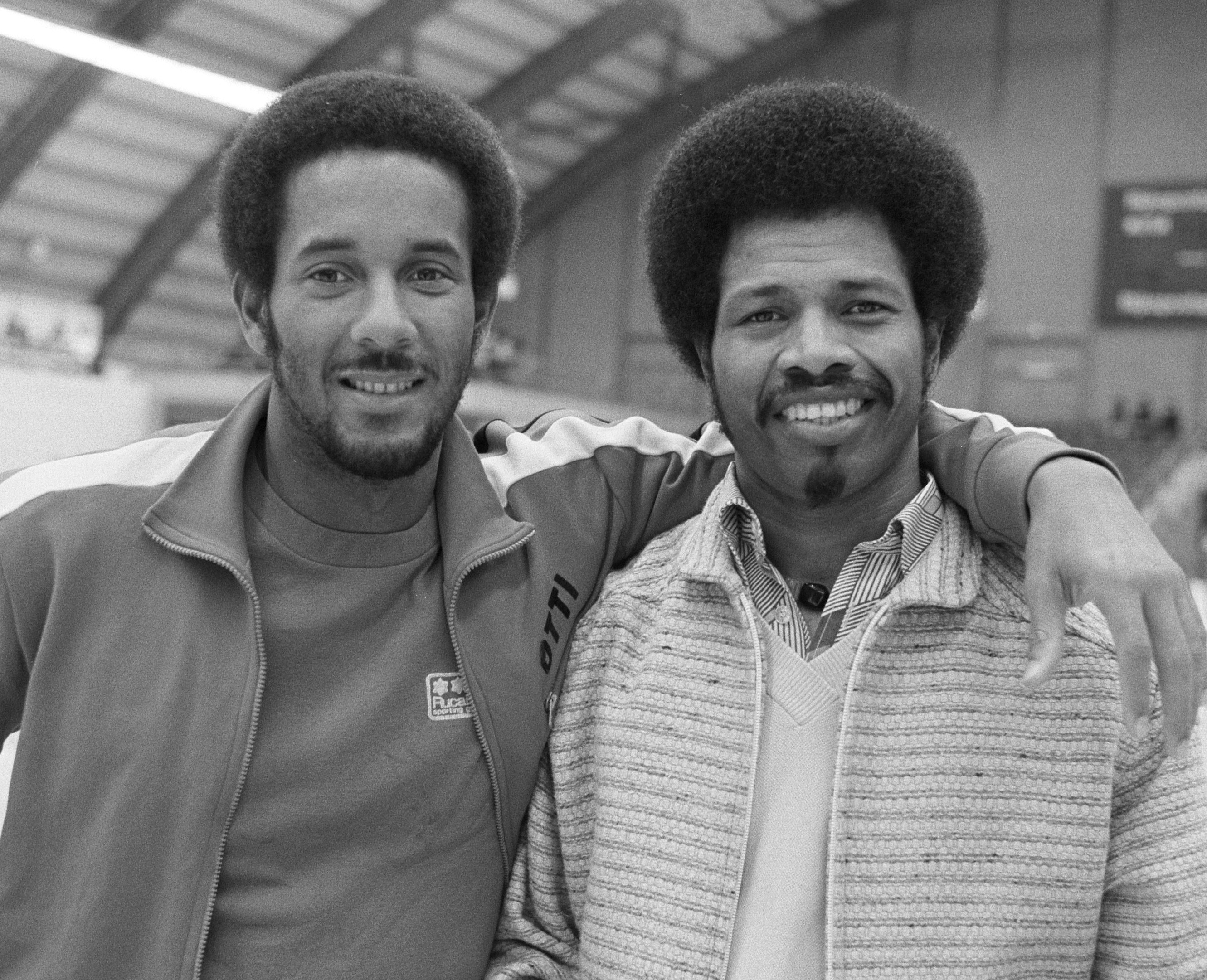
- Otti Roethof (left) and John Reeberg in 1980

Personal information
- Born: John Roel Reeberg; 19 October 1947 (age 78) Paramaribo, Suriname

Sport
- Sport: Karate
Medal record
Representing the Netherlands
World Championships
Gold medal – first place	1977 Tokyo	Kumite team
Bronze medal – third place	1982 Taipei	Kumite +80 kg
European Championships
Silver medal – second place	1975 Ostend	Kumite −80 kg
Gold medal – first place	1978 Geneva	Kumite open
Gold medal – first place	1979 Helsinki	Kumite +80 kg

John Reeberg (born 19 October 1947) is a retired Dutch-Surinamese karateka. He was a European champion in heavyweight categories in 1978 and 1979 and won a bronze medal at the 1982 World Championships. Earlier in 1977 he became a world champion in the team competition, together with Otti Roethof and Ludwig Kotzebue.

Reeberg is married to Carmelita Reeberg-Muyden, they have a son, John-Roger. Since 1994 they run a security company named Reeberg Beveiliging BV.
