= Mitsusuke Harada =

Japanese master of Shotokai karate (1928–2021)

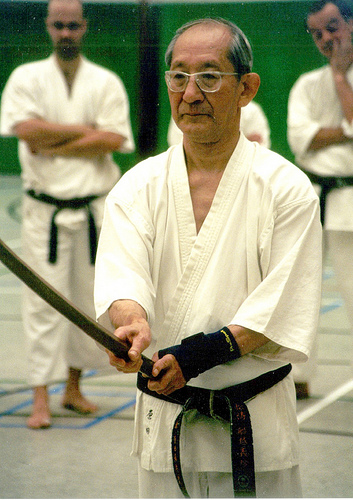
- Born: 16 November 1928; Dairen, Manchuria, Empire of Japan
- Died: 26 February 2021 (aged 92); Cwmbran, Wales, United Kingdom
- Style: Shotokai karate
- Teachers: Shigeru Egami, Gichin Funakoshi, Gigō Funakoshi, Genshin Hironishi
- Rank: 5th dan karate

Other information
- Website: http://www.karatedoshotokai.com/

Mitsusuke Harada, MBE (原田 満祐, Harada Mitsusuke; 16 November 1928 – 26 February 2021) was a prominent Japanese master of Shotokai karate who introduced this martial art to Brazil and was after based in the United Kingdom. He founded the Karate-do Shotokai (KDS) organisation in 1965 and was its president. Harada held the rank of 5th dan, personally awarded by Gichin Funakoshi in 1956.

== Early life ==
Harada was born on 16 November 1928 in Dairen, Manchuria, which was then part of the Empire of Japan; his father was a Japanese army officer. He lived there until the age of 9 years, when his family returned to Tokyo. Harada began training in karate in 1943 at the Shotokan karate dojo (training hall) in Zōshigaya, Toshima Ward, Tokyo. His first class was taught by Genshin Hironishi, then ranked 4th dan. He later met Gigō Funakoshi there, only two years before the latter's death due to illness. On 29 April 1945, an Allied bombing raid on Tokyo destroyed the Shotokan dojo; Harada wrote a letter to Gichin Funakoshi requesting to continue training if possible, and Funakoshi invited him to train at his eldest son's home, in Koishikawa. Harada studied directly under Gichin Funakoshi.

In 1948, Harada began studying economics and commerce at Waseda University. At the university, he trained under both Funakoshi (on Saturdays) and Toshio Kamata (Watanabe), and befriended Tsutomu Ohshima. In 1949, the Japan Karate Association (JKA) was formed; Harada was often escorting Funakoshi by taxi around this time. He also came into contact with Shigeru Egami (also studying commerce at the time) and Tadao Okuyama, then ranked 3rd dan, at Waseda. Harada trained under both men, and they had a significant influence on his karate style. Harada completed his Bachelor of Commerce degree in 1953 and went on to complete a master's degree in 1955. During postgraduate studies, he assisted Masatoshi Nakayama in teaching karate to US military personnel.

== Brazil ==
Following completion of his tertiary studies, Harada took a position with the Bank of South America in São Paulo, Brazil. His manager there, on learning of his new employee's martial art training, asked him to conduct a demonstration; following this, fellow employees and other associates began training under his direction. Initially, the karate training took place in a judo dojo. Harada wrote to Funakoshi to request affiliation with the JKA, but the latter apparently wrote back advising him to start his own karate organisation. This marked the birth of Karate-do Shotokan Brazileo.

In 1956, Funakoshi awarded Harada the rank of 5th dan, which was then the highest rank in Shotokan karate. He has kept the same rank to this day, and 5th dan is still the highest rank attainable in his organisation (the KDS). In April 1957, Egami sent Harada a telegram to inform him that Funakoshi had died. In the period that followed, political troubles saw many of Funakoshi's senior students (including Harada) form the Shōtōkai group separate from the JKA.

== United Kingdom ==
By 1963, Harada had around 16 yudansha (students holding black belt status) at his dojo. At the time, karate students in Paris had heard of him and saved enough money to buy him an airline ticket to their city; Harada resigned from the bank, intending to take a year to travel before returning to Brazil. After teaching in France, he travelled to the United Kingdom at the invitation of Kenshiro Abbe. In early November 1963, he taught a karate course at Abbe's dojo. On 23 November 1963, Harada demonstrated karate as part of the National Judo Championships being held in London.

Through the mid-1960s, Harada taught karate in the UK and Brussels. He founded the KDS in 1965. Harada returned to Japan for six months in 1967 and, while he apparently did not consider the journey fruitful overall, he did confirm a replacement to lead his dojo in Brazil: Arinobu Ishibata. Harada was based in the UK for the rest of his life. The KDS experienced significant divisions in 1971 and 1988.

Harada has also taught at other overseas clubs that were developed including: Canada, Estonia, Finland, Gibraltar, Israel, Morocco, Poland, Spain, and the USA.

== Later life ==
In October 1998, the Nihon Karate-do Shotokai invited Harada back to Tokyo to demonstrate his art as part of Shotokan karate's 60th anniversary celebration, and he and a selection of his top students did so. In 2007, Queen Elizabeth II appointed Harada as a Member of the Order of the British Empire for his services to karate. Martial arts author Clive Layton has written two biographical works on Harada: Karate Master: The life and times of Mitsusuke Harada (1997) and Reminiscences by Master Mitsusuke Harada (1999, co-authored with Harada).

Mitsuske Harada died on 26 February 2021 at his home in Cwmbran at the age of 92.
