= Let Sleeping Cops Lie =

Let Sleeping Cops Lie Ne réveillez pas un flic qui dort
- Directed by: José Pinheiro
- Written by: Frédéric H. Fajardie (novel); Alain Delon; José Pinheiro
- Produced by: Alain Delon; Jacques Bar
- Starring: Alain Delon; Michel Serrault
- Cinematography: Raoul Coutard
- Production companies: TF1 Films Production; Leda Productions; Cité Films
- Distributed by: Capital Cinéma
- Release date: 14 December 1988
- Running time: 97 minutes
- Country: France
- Language: French
- Box office: $6 million

Let Sleeping Cops Lie, also known as Don't Wake a Sleeping Cop (French: Ne réveillez pas un flic qui dort), is a French crime film released in 1988, directed by José Pinheiro, starring Alain Delon and Michel Serrault. The screenplay was written by Alain Delon and José Pinheiro based on the novel Clause de style by Frédéric H. Fajardie.

The movie tells the story of police inspector Eugéne Grindel (Delon) who investigates the secret illegal ultra-right police organization which metes out justice on a fast track.

Let Sleeping Cops Lie is the last film of a group of popular movies released in the 1980s and starring Alain Delon, which share a visual and narrative style, beginning with Jacques Deray's Three Men to Kill (1980). It was the least successfully commercially.

Alain Delon, also the film's producer, dedicated the work to the memory of actor Jean Gabin.

== Plot ==
Roger Scatti (Serrault) is a conservative police inspector of the old school. He finds intolerable the liberalization of the justice system. More and more people from the underground world slip away from the justice. Finding allies in the police circles, he founded the ultra-right secret illegal organization called "Police devotion". Its purpose is the immediate punishment, usually death, of the notorious criminals, with no trials or whatever inquiries and no bureaucracy. The activities of the organization are particularly brutal, serving for edification to the public. When the punitive operations of the "Police devotion" go out of all bounds, the police chief Cazalières (Gérôme) assign a task to inspector Eugéne Grindel (Delon) to investigate the present circumstances.

== Cast ==
- Alain Delon as a police inspector Eugéne Grindel
- Michel Serrault as a police inspector Roger Scatti
- Xavier Deluc as Lutz
- Patrick Catalifo as Pèret, Grindel's assistant
- Raymond Gérôme as a chief inspector Cazalières
- Serge Reggiani as Le Stéphanois
- Bernard Farcy as Inspector Latueva
- Féodor Atkine as Stadler
- Roxan Gould as Jennifer
- Stéphane Jobert as Spiero
- Consuelo De Haviland as Corinne
- Dominique Valera as Valles
- Bruno Raffaelli as Zelleim
- Guy Cuevas as Bessoni
- Rémy Kirch as Ginzbaum
- Olivier Marchal as Ginzbaum's friend
- Philippe Nahon as Sergeant #2
- Laurent Gamelon as The Baby's Man
