= Willy Voss =

German karateka (born 1952)

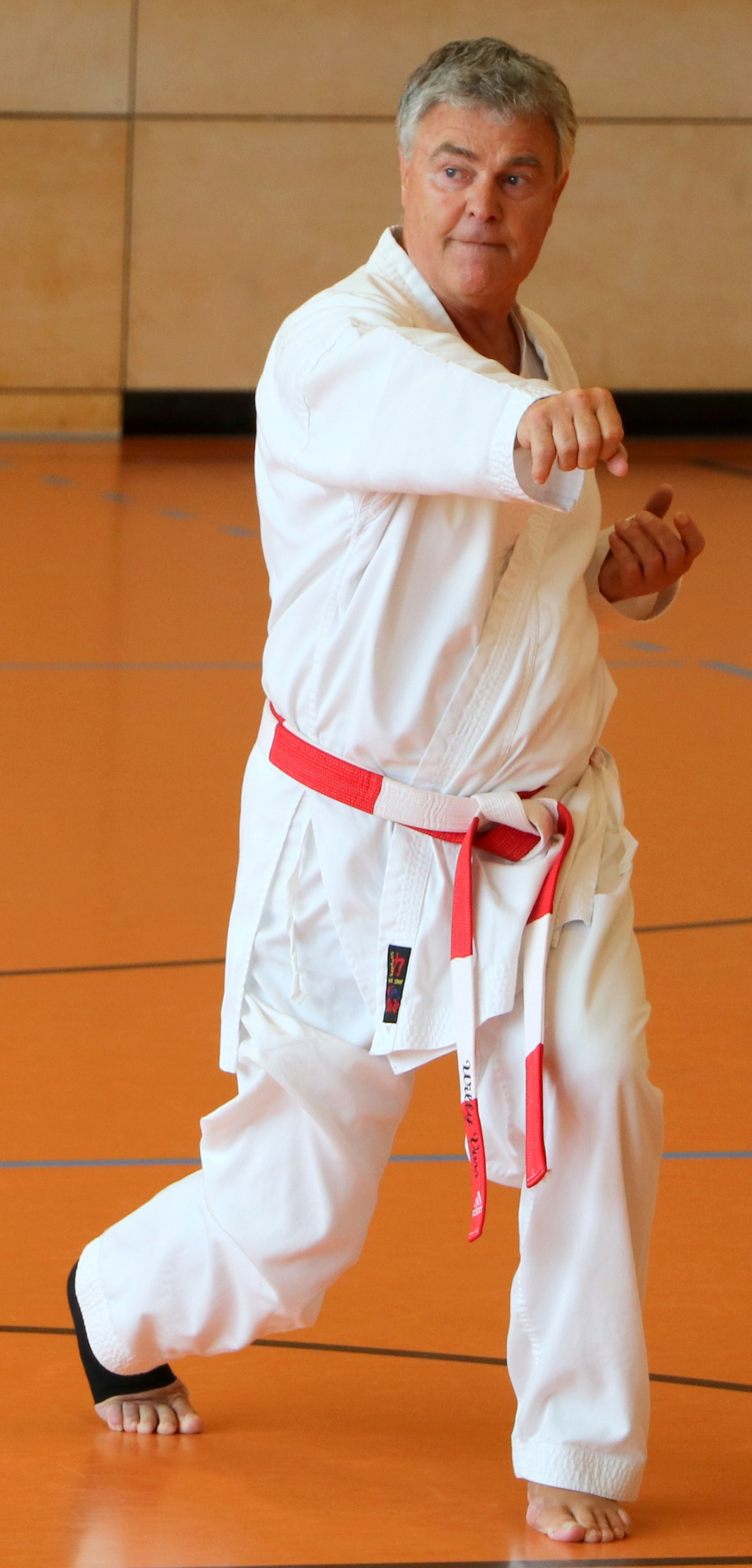
- Born: 15 October 1952 (age 74); Freiburg, West Germany
- Style: Karate

Willy Voss (born 15 October 1952) is a German karateka. He won multiple medals in the European Karate Championships and Karate World Championships in Kumite.
