= German Karate Federation =

Karate association in Germany

- Sport: Karate
- Jurisdiction: National
- Affiliation: World Karate Federation (WKF)
- Regional affiliation: European Karate Federation

Official website
- www.karate.de
- (Germany)

German Karate Federation (German: Deutscher Karate Verband e. V. (DKV), it is the largest trade association for karate in Germany.

== International competition ==
German Karate Federation is a member of the European umbrella organization European Karate Federation as well as the World Association for World Karate Federation (WKF).

On the part of the German Olympic Committee, the German Karate Federation is the only Karate Association authorized to send athletes to the Olympic Games.
