= French Karate Federation =

Governing body of Karate in France

- Sport: Karate
- Jurisdiction: National
- Affiliation: World Karate Federation (WKF)
- Regional affiliation: European Karate Federation

Official website
- www.ffkarate.fr
- (France)

The French Karate Federation (Fédération Française de Karaté) is the largest association for karate in France and a member as well as the official representative for this sport in the French National Olympic and Sports Committee.

== History ==
In 1975, the French Karate and Affinity Martial Arts Federation (FFKAMA) gained independence from the French Judo Federation.

In 2005, FFKAMA changed its name to become the French Karate and Associated Disciplines Federation (FFKDA).

In September 2017, FFKDA shortened its name to become the French Karate Federation (FFK).

== Presidents ==
- 1975-1998 : Jacques Delcourt
- 1998-2001 : Gérard Garçon
- 2001-2024 : Francis Didier
- Since 2024 : Bruno Verfaillie

== International competition ==
French Karate Federation is a member of the European umbrella organization European Karate Federation as well as the World Association for World Karate Federation (WKF).

On the part of the France Olympic Committee, the French Karate Federation is the only Karate Association authorized to send athletes to the Olympic Games.

Behind Japan, France ranks as the world’s second most successful nation since the establishment of global competitions in 1970. With 38 world titles across all categories—including six in the premier team event—it surpasses England (28 titles), Spain (19 titles), and Italy (12 titles) over the past 40 years.
