= Shigeru Egami =

Japanese karateka

- Historical photo of Shigeru Egami
- Born: December 7, 1912; Ōmuta, Fukuoka Prefecture, Japan
- Died: January 8, 1981 (aged 68); Tokyo, Japan; Illness
- Native name: 江上 茂
- Style: Shotokan and Shōtōkai karate
- Teacher(s): Gichin Funakoshi; Gigō Funakoshi; Takeshi Shimoda; Isao Obata

Other information
- Notable students: Mitsusuke Harada; Tetsuji Murakami

Shigeru Egami (江上 茂, Egami Shigeru, December 7, 1912 – January 8, 1981) was a pioneering Japanese master of Shotokan karate who founded the Shōtōkai style. He was a student of Gichin Funakoshi, who is widely recognized as the founder of modern karate.

== Early life ==
Egami was born on December 7, 1912, in Ōmuta, Fukuoka Prefecture, Japan. He was one of Gichin Funakoshi's earliest students. Egami met Funakoshi when he began studying at Waseda University. Egami helped to establish the university's karate club. Before that occasion he had already trained in judo, kendo, and aikido.

== Karate career ==
With Funakoshi, his son Gigō Funakoshi, and Takeshi Shimoda, Egami traveled around Japan staging exhibitions to promote karate as a Japanese martial art. He was elected a Member of the Evaluation Committee by Gichin Funakoshi, the youngest instructor to receive that honor. He taught karate at the Gakushuin, Toho and Chūō Universities. On May 27, 1949, he helped establish the Japan Karate Association under Funakoshi.

After Egami turned 40, his health worsened. After 1956, he underwent two operations, and at one point was in cardiac arrest for just under 10 minutes. Following Funakoshi's death in 1957, Egami began trying to change karate's poor reputation as a 'deadly martial art,' something Funakoshi had tried to do all his life. Egami never compromised on one essential aspect of karate: to avoid all aspects of sport-oriented combat and karate. He considered that competitions modified the training and spirit of karate too much, and he emphasized that this would be perfectly clear once one had the insight that karate is much more than winning combats.

In 1973, Egami visited Los Angeles to teach, and in 1976 he toured Taiwan and five European countries on a similar mission. Egami wrote the book The Way of Karate: Beyond technique (1976). Revised editions were published posthumously as The Heart of Karate-Do in 1986 and 2000.

== Later life ==
In his later years, Egami was troubled by many illnesses. A cerebral embolia saw him go three months without eating solid food, which tested his strength, and he eventually weighed only 37 kg. Egami died at 7:00 PM on January 8, 1981, in Tokyo.^{[a]}

== See also ==
- Isao Obata
- List of Shotokan organizations

== Notes ==
a. An alternative source gives January 10, 1981, as the date of Egami's death.
