= Shōtōkai =

Karate organisation

Shotokai (松濤會, Shōtōkai) is the organisation formed originally in 1930 by master Gichin Funakoshi to teach and spread the art of karate-Do. Nowadays, the name also designates a formal practice method.

== Origins ==
Shotokai is not an official style of karate. Shotokai is the name of the association launched by Gichin Funakoshi originally in 1930. The original name was Dai Nihon Karate-do Kenkyukai. The association is known in Japan as Dai Nihon Karate-do Shotokai since 1936. Shotokan is the name of its Honbu Dojo (main practicing hall). Gichin Funakoshi's karate style is also known as Shotokan ryu.

After Master Funakoshi died 26 April 1957 in Tokyo, according to the wishes of Master Funakoshi's oldest son, Giei, the Shotokai (seniors were Genshin Hironishi and Shigeru Egami) was to conduct the funeral. The JKA / Kyokai led by Masatoshi Nakayama protested that they should be the ones to conduct the funeral. No agreement could be reached and JKA / Kyokai boycotted the funeral. This created a rift in Shotokan which continues to the present.

The name derives from Shoto, the pen name which Funakoshi used to sign his poems, literally translated as "pine leaves". Kai means "group" or 'method'; therefore, Shotokai is translated as "Shoto's group" or "Shoto's method." Shotokai's most prominent masters are Gichin Funakoshi with his top students Giko (Yoshitaka) Funakoshi, Genshin (Motonobu) Hironishi, Tadao Okuyama and Shigeru Egami.

At Funakoshi's death in 1957, his students split into several factions: on one side was a group known as Nihon Karate Kyokai (Japan Karate Association, JKA) and on another side the Shotokai Association. One of the largest issues between them was the question of whether competitions were to be introduced or not.

Although Shotokai is the name of Shotokan Karate association, it has a defined practice method widely known as Shotokai Karate. Master Shigeru Egami defined the broad outlines of the new way of practising that he developed after having, in a number of tests, thought and concluded there was some inefficiency of the karate method developed by other schools until that time.

After years of research, Egami found an efficient way of striking by executing the movement in a relaxed state of mind and body. This is the basis of Shotokai. It focuses on suppleness and relaxation, as opposed to tenseness that generates force. Elaborating this basic idea, he suggested new forms of techniques and a new way of practising.

Shotokai refrains from competition because its founding master Gichin Funakoshi, who was also a Confucianist philosopher and a teacher, used to say that there are no contests in Karate. Master Egami wrote: "First of all, we must practise Karate like a combat technique and then, with time and experience, we will be able to understand a certain state of soul and will be able to open ourselves to the horizons of 'jita-ittai' (the union of one with the other) which lay beyond fighting. This is the principle of coexistence which enables us to live together in prosperity."

Shotokai is the keeper of Gichin Funakoshi's Karate heritage, and has for example republished his books for many years. It has also kept the art of Shotokan Karate weaponry (primarily the traditional weapon of okinawan bojutsu, or Bō/kon in Japanese) within practice schedule.

== Master instructors ==
- Gichin Funakoshi (1868–1957)
- Isao Obata (1904–1976)
- Takeshi Shimoda (1901–1934)
- Gigō Funakoshi (1906–1945), Gichin's third son, also known as Yoshitaka Funakoshi or Waka Sensei (the young master).
- Shigeru Egami (1912–1981) Shigeru Egami was the chief instructor of the Shotokan Dojo 1976–1981.
- Motonobu Hironishi (1913–1999), studied under Gichin and Yoshitaka. He was the president of the Shotokai 1962–1995.
- Tadao Okuyama (1918–2006)
- Toshio Watanabe (1918-2018)
- Matsuo Shibuya (1925-)
- Hiroshi Noguchi
- Jotaro Takagi (1927–2016), was the chairman of the Shotokai in Tokyo from 1995.
- Mitsusuke Harada (1928–2021), studied under Gichin and Yoshitaka Funakoshi. He received his fifth dan from Gichin Funakoshi in 1956.
- Tetsuji Murakami (1927–1987)
- Ayahito Sugimoto ( 1932–2005)
- Sadaharu Honda (1939-)
- Atsuo Hiruma (1941–)
- Tomoji Miyamoto (1945–)
- Kenjiro Kawanabe (1931–)

== The style ==
Shotokai Karate differs much from other Shotokan karate branches (JKA, SKI, ITKF, SKA, etc.) in that it emphasizes spiritual practice over competitive tournaments. The traditional 15 forms or kata proposed by G. Funakoshi are practiced in the same way as in other forms of karate, although Shotokai often emphasizes smooth, flowing movements rather than the sharp, snappy, rigid movements of other styles, which does not mean that the style is gentle but rather it believes that an effective hand or foot strike resides in "decontraction". Sparring or Kumite in some Shotokai schools is often practiced with full strength attacks, and it is tightly controlled in terms of who is attacking and defending, and the attacks that can be performed in order to reduce the chance of injury. The essence of Shoto-Kai karate is found in the tactic of "sen no sen" - "irimi". This is the ability to predict an opponent's intent and entering into his attack, anticipating it; thus catching the opponent very early. A seasoned practitioner should be able to predict the opponent's intentions often before there is any visible movement, which is the ultimate fulfillment of Funakoshi's statement that stated: 'there is no first attack' in karate. The emphasis on "sen no sen" tactics is a profound and distinguishing element of Shoto Kai practice.
