= Jacques Delcourt =

French sport administrator

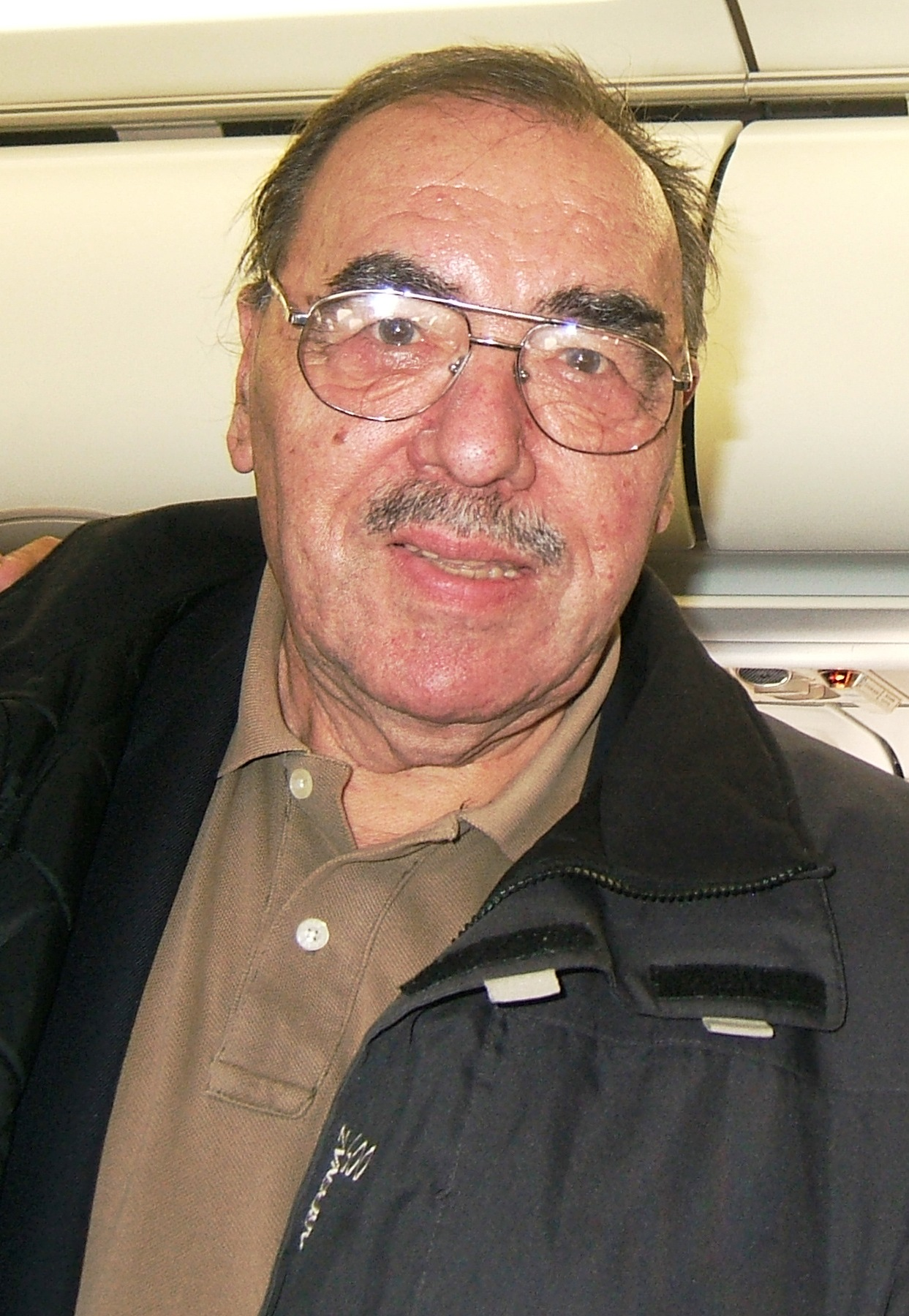
- Born: August 21, 1928; Le Touquet-Paris-Plage, France
- Died: November 19, 2011 (aged 83)
- Style: Karate
- Teacher: Henry Plée

Jacques Delcourt (August 21, 1928 – November 11, 2011) was a prominent Sports administrator who was instrumental in creating the European Karate Union which later became the European Karate Federation and this in turn inspired the creation of the World Union of Karate Organisations that became the World Karate Federation. He was highly decorated by the French Government, including the award of Officer of the Legion of Honour.

== Biography ==
Jacques Delcourt joined the French resistance at the age of fifteen and became a member of the Civil and Military Organization. A year later, when he was sixteen, he was wounded in combat and assigned to the 110th Regiment infanterie.

Jacques Delcourt was appointed head of the French Karate Federation in 1961 when the discipline is still a branch of the French Judo Federation. In 1963 he was a semi-finalist in the championships of France by team.

The same year, he invites France, to participate in the first international competition of karate history, leaders of six other national federations fully constituted and which are located in Germany, Belgium, Spain, Italy Switzerland and the United Kingdom. These countries agree, and Congress they form lead to the creation of the European Karate Federation of Karate in 1965. Delcourt became its first president.

Therefore, it made contact with Japanese officials. Their discussions lead to the creation of the World Karate Federation, which also becomes the President Delcourt. The first championships karate world shortly after Tokyo in 1970.

Delcourt ceases to be president of the European Karate Federation in 1997. He remained, however, Honorary President and Life Member of the Executive Committees Worlds and Europeans, as well as the Steering Committee of the French Federation of Karate and associated disciplines, (ex- quality by implementing global laws) and Chairman (President) of the Legal Committee and Disciplinary World. He was a member of the French Olympic Committee from 1980 to 1992. He is a black belt 6th Dan Karate and holds the Gold Medal of the Prestige of the French Federation of Karate and associated disciplines.

His professional career: company lawyer (Volvo and Charbonnages de France group paints Ripolin) holds a Master in Law and a DESS (Masters) option "Management and Sports Law." He is an Officer of the Legion of Honour, Knight of the National Order of Merit and holder of many decorations and distinctions.

He died November 19, 2011, at the age of 83 at his home.
