= Guy Sauvin =

French karateka

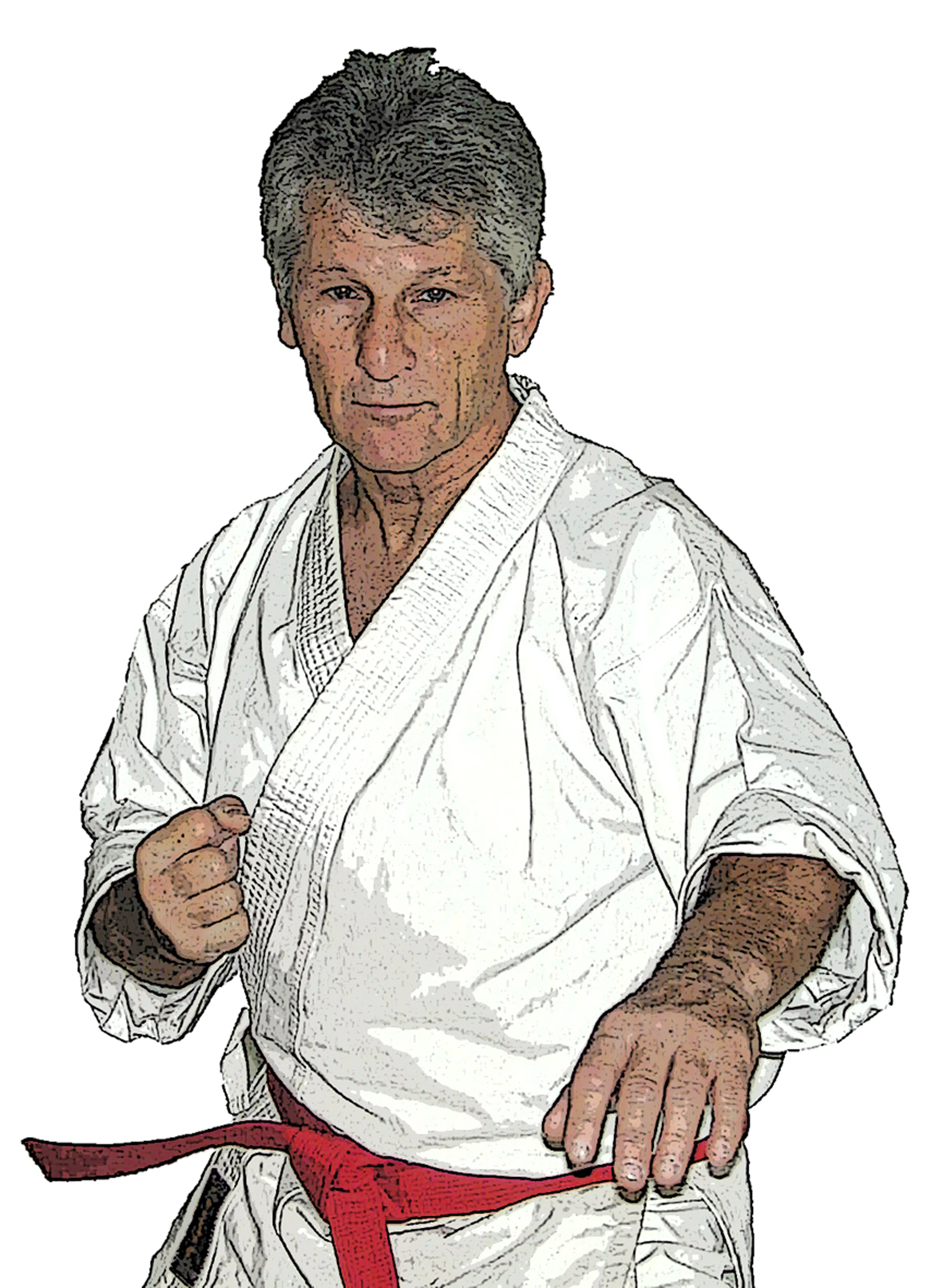
- Born: 4 November 1942 (age 83)
- Style: Karate

Guy Sauvin is a French karateka. He won multiple medals at both the Karate World Championships and the European Karate Championships in both individual and team kumite. He has also been featured multiple times in the French versions of both Karate and Karate Bushido magazines.
