= Francis Didier =

French karateka

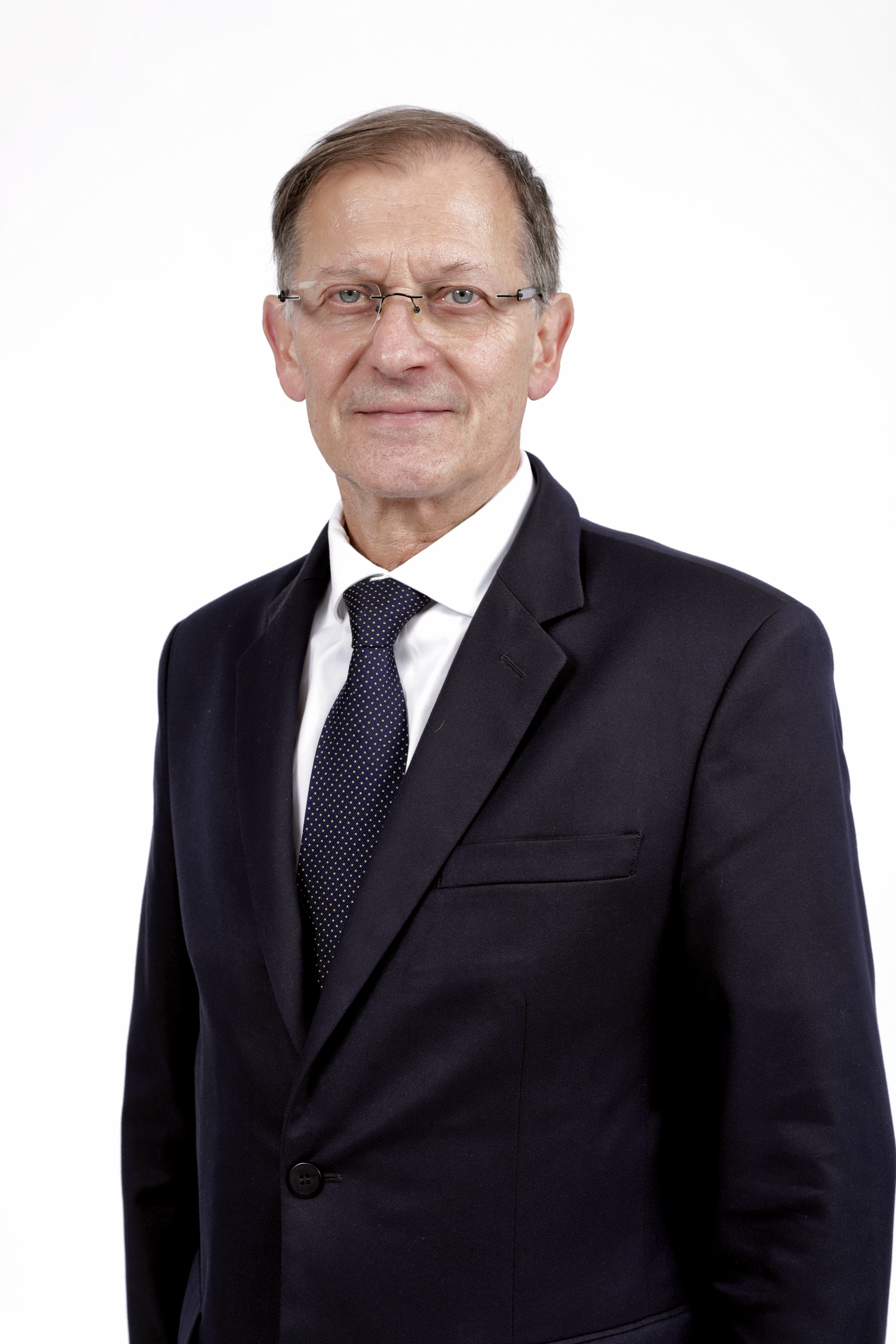
- Born: 2 December 1949 (age 76); Épinal, France
- Nationality: French
- Style: Karate

Francis Didier (born 2 December 1949) is a French karateka, currently 7th dan. He was the European champion in kumite individual men's open at the European Karate Championships in 1973. Since 2001, he has been the president of the French Karate Federation, having been re-elected successively in 2005, 2009, 2013 and 2016.
