= Gilbert Gruss =

French karateka (1943–2016)

- Born: Gilbert Nicolas Gruss; 10 February 1943; Algrange, France
- Died: October 1, 2016 (aged 73)
- Style: Karate

Gilbert Gruss born February 10, 1943, in Algrange, France and died on October 1, 2016, is a multiple winner of international karate tournaments.
