= Otti Roethof =

Dutch martial artist

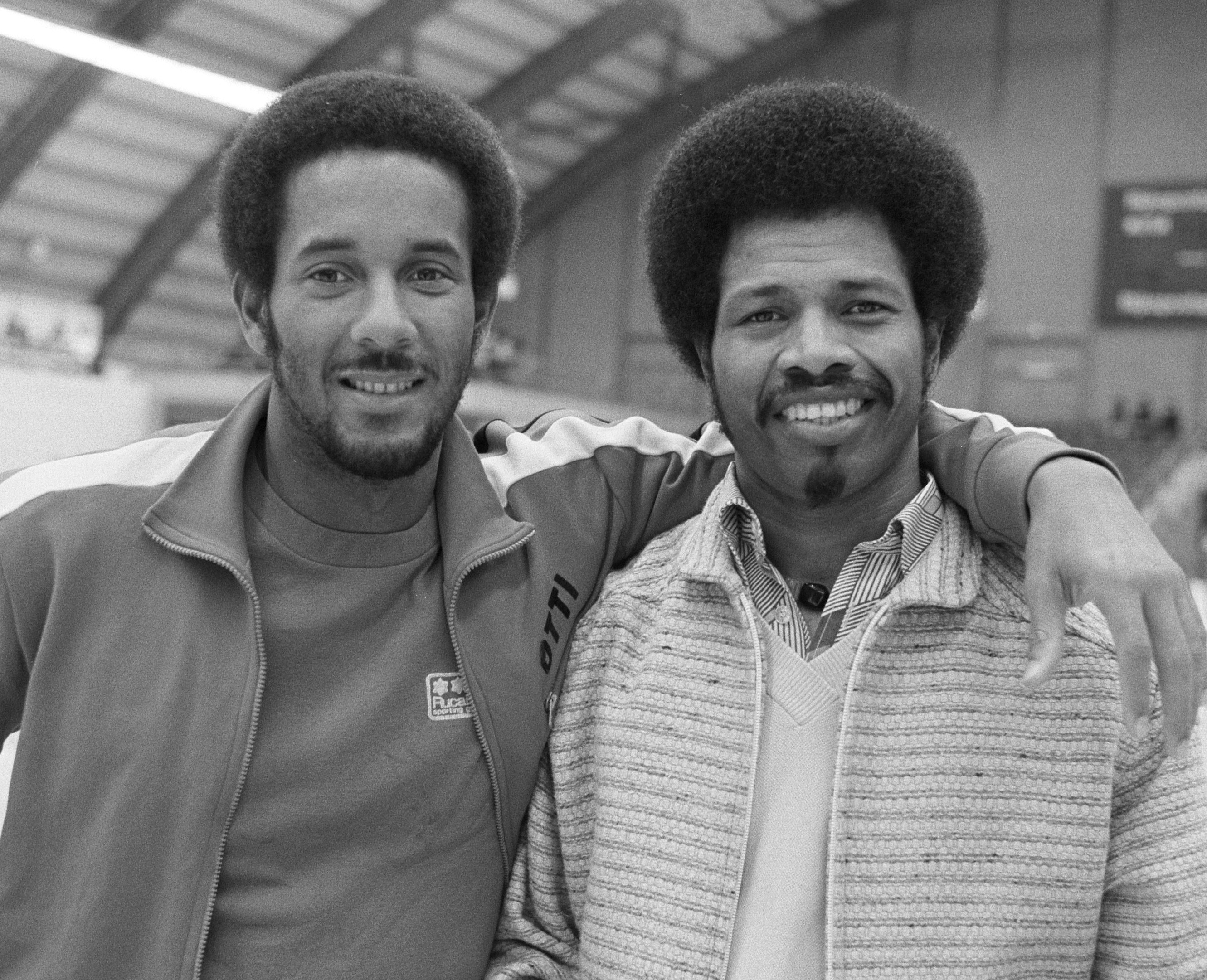
- Otti Roethof (left) and John Reeberg in 1980
- Born: ca. 1950 (age 75–76); Curaçao
- Style: Karate

Otti Roethof (born c. 1950) is a former Dutch karateka.

Roethof was born on Curaçao and moved with his family to Suriname at the age of 10. In the early 70s he moved to the Netherlands, where he lived in Amsterdam. Between 1977 and 1984 he won multiple Karate medals at the European and World Karate Championships. In 1977 in Tokyo he became the first non-Japanese world champion. In 1984 he published the book Karate: een handboek voor trainer, coach en karateka (ISBN 90-6076-192-8). In 1985 he became coach of the Dutch national karate team. At his last world championships in 1986 he comes in fourth.

Roethof ran several sport schools and owned a sports retail shop in the 1990s.
