= Dominique Valera =

French actor and karateka

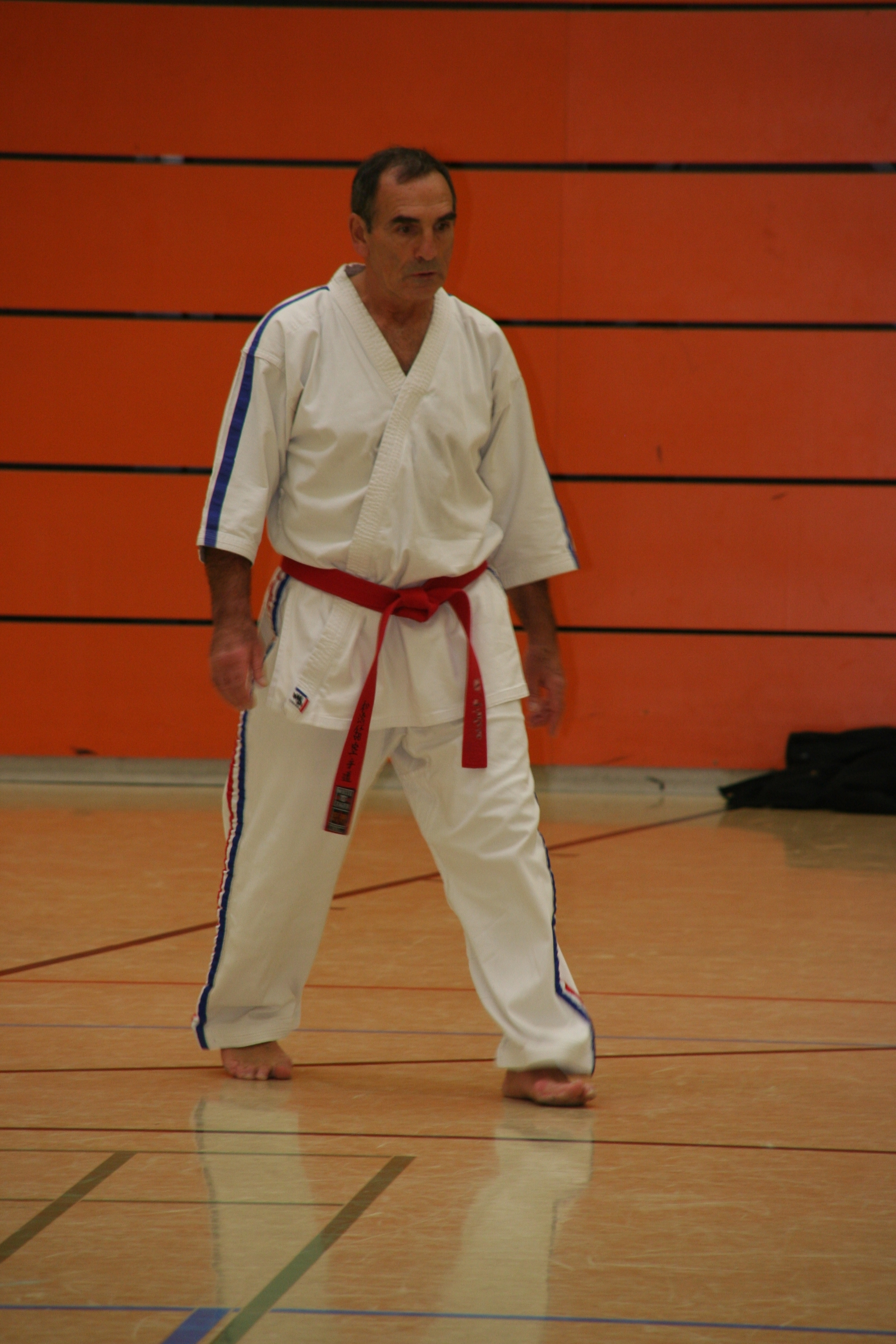
- Valera in 2008
- Born: June 14, 1947 (age 79); Lyon, France
- Nationality: (France) French
- Height: 6 ft 2 in (1.88 m)
- Division: Heavyweight
- Style: Karate

Other information
- Website: Official site

Dominique Valera (born June 14, 1947) is a French kickboxer and karateka, based in Lyon. He has a 10th Dan black belt in karate and is the winner of multiple European Karate Championships. Since retiring from competitive karate Dominique Valera has starred in French movies such as Let Sleeping Cops Lie.

== Karate ==
From a family of Spanish immigrants, Dominique Valera began karate shotokan in 1960, after six years of judo.

He is a team world champion and has never become individual world champion following a disqualification due to a disagreement with a referee1 at the 1975 World Karate Championships in Long Beach, California. The matter then flows far more ink than blood, and the champion suffers immediate consequences. He is excluded from the French federation held by Mr. Delcourt and can not reinstate him until much later when his friend Francis Didier will be the president by integrating karate contact as new section.

Five years earlier, he won one of the first two individual bronze medals in the world karate championships, finishing third with Tonny Tullener of the United States at the end of the men's ippon championship world of karate 1970 in Tokyo, Japan

== Full Contact Karate ==
In 1975 Dominique Valera entered Full Contact Karate and fought the likes of Bill Wallace and Jeff Smith. He finished his full contact karate career with 14 victories and 4 defeats.

== Achievements ==
- 1966 European Karate Championships Kumite Gold Medal
- 1968 European Karate Championships Kumite Silver Medal
- 1969 European Karate Championships Kumite Gold Medal
- 1971 European Karate Championships Kumite Gold Medal
- 1972 European Karate Championships Kumite Gold Medal
- 1970 World Karate Championships Kumite Bronze Medal
- 1972 World Karate Championships Gold Silver Medal

== Filmography ==
- 1985 : Parole de flic
- 1986 : Twist Again in Moscow
- 1987 : Terminus
- 1988 : Ne réveillez pas un flic qui dort
- 2000 : Ainsi soit-il (film)
