= European Karate Federation =

International governing body for karate

- Jurisdiction: Europe
- Membership: 52 members
- Abbreviation: EKF
- Founded: 1963; 62 years ago
- Headquarters: Madrid
- Location: Europe
- President: Antonio Espinós of Spain

Official website
- www.europeankaratefederation.net

The European Karate Federation (EKF) is the governing body of competitive karate in more than 50 countries across Europe. The EKF's stated goal is to promote, organize, regulate, and popularize the sport of karate. It is one of the five continental federations recognized by the World Karate Federation.

EKU (1966–1992) / EKF (from 1993)

== History ==
On 31 March 1961, a karate teacher named Jacques Delcourt was elected President of the French Karate Federation (which was a member of the French Judo Federation). In 1963, he invited the six other federations in Europe to come to France for the first international karate event in history. Of the six federations - which hailed from Italy, Great Britain, Belgium, Germany, Switzerland, and Spain - only Great Britain and Belgium accepted the invitation.

On 15 December 1963, the French, British, and Belgian federations gathered in Paris for the first European Karate Congress. They sought to improve and organize karate tournaments between their respective countries. The European Karate Union (Union Européenne de Karaté) was officially founded on this day.

Martial artists from the three countries utilized varying styles of karate, and unifying the different styles proved difficult for the separate federations. Consequently, the delegates decided to unify the refereeing.

On 24 May 1964, a governance structure for the EKU was established at the Second European Karate Congress. Jacques Delcourt was elected the first president, a position he held until 1988. At the Third Congress, on 21 November 1965, the delegates - now representing ten countries - adopted a constitutional structure, and standardized rules for instruction and rankings. They also scheduled the first European Karate Championships, to be held in Paris in May 1966.

Since 1966, it has organized the European Karate Championships. Additionally, it now organizes Junior, Cadet, and Under-21 Championships(European Juniors Karate Championships).

The first Championship drew approximately 300 spectators and was broadcast live on television. The event drew criticism for being too violent, as multiple participants received facial injuries. The EKU Council offered differing opinions about the causes of the injuries, ranging from excessive rule violations to disparities in skills and conditioning. The issue of excess injuries was addressed at the EKU's first referee seminar, held in Rome in 1967.

In 1993, the EKU changed its name to the European Karate Federation. Since 1997, Spain's Antonio Espinos has served as president. He has also been the President of the World Karate Federation since 1998.

In reaction to the 2022 Russian invasion of Ukraine, the European Karate Federation removed Moscow as the host of the 2023 Senior European Karate Championships, which had been scheduled to be held in Moscow.

== Member federations ==
Europe			
Albania	Andorra	Armenia	Austria
Azerbaijan	Belarus	Belgium	Bosnia and Herzegovina
Bulgaria	Croatia	Cyprus	Czech Republic
England	Estonia	Finland	France
Georgia	Germany	Greece	Hungary
Iceland	Ireland	Israel	Italy
Kosovo	Latvia	Liechtenstein	Lithuania
Luxembourg	Malta	Monaco	Montenegro
Netherlands	North Macedonia	Northern Ireland	Norway
Poland	Portugal	Moldova	Romania
Russia	San Marino	Scotland	Serbia
Slovakia	Slovenia	Spain	Sweden
Switzerland	Turkey	Ukraine	Wales
