= European Karate Championships =

Karate competition

Competition details
- Discipline: Karate
- Type: Kumite and Kata Individual and Team, Annual
- Organiser: European Karate Federation (EKF)

History
- First edition: 1966 in Paris, France

The European Karate Championships are organised by the European Karate Federation each year.

== History ==
Events from 1966 to 1996 were organized by the European Karate Union. In 1961, Jacques Delcourt was appointed President of French Karate, which was at that stage, an associated member of the Judo Federation. In 1963, he invited six other known European federations (Italy, Great Britain, Belgium, Germany, Switzerland and Spain) to come to France for the first-ever international karate event. Great Britain and Belgium accepted the invitation.

By 1965, the European Karate Union was created with Jacques Delcourt voted in as President. The following year the first European Karate Championships were held in Paris. The event drew roughly three hundred spectators and was shown live on television. It drew criticism for being too violent as there were many facial injuries. The EKU council had differing opinions about the cause(s) of the injuries. With opinions ranging from excessive violations of rules to lack of conditioning and blocking skill, this problem was addressed in some part, at the first referee course held in Rome. At that time, the refereeing rules were harmonised using the JKA rules as a basis.

The 2023 event was scheduled to be held in Moscow, Russia but the country was stripped of the right to host the event after the 2022 Russian invasion of Ukraine.

== Editions ==
EKU Championships (1966–1992) and EKF Championships (since 1993). Para Karate was added to championships since 2018.

Edition	Year	Host City	Host country	Events
Organized by European Karate Union (EKU)
1	1966	Paris	France	2
2	1967	London	United Kingdom	2
3	1968	Paris	France	2
4	1969	London	United Kingdom	2
5	1970	Hamburg	Germany	2
6	1971	Paris	France	2
7	1972	Brussels	Belgium	5
8	1973	Valencia	Spain	5
9	1974	London	United Kingdom	5
10	1975	Ostend	Belgium	5
11	1976	Tehran	Iran	7
12	1977	Paris	France	7
13	1978	Geneva	Switzerland	7
14	1979	Helsinki	Finland	9
15	1980	Barcelona	Spain	12
16	1981	Venice	Italy	12
17	1982	Gothenburg	Sweden	15
18	1983	Madrid	Spain	15
19	1984	Paris	France	16
20	1985	Oslo	Norway	16
21	1986	Madrid	Spain	16
22	1987	Glasgow	United Kingdom	16
23	1988	Genoa	Italy	17
24	1989	Titograd	Yugoslavia	17
25	1990	Vienna	Austria	17
26	1991	Hanover	Germany	18
27	1992	's-Hertogenbosch	Netherlands	17
Organized by European Karate Federation (EKF)
28	1993	Prague	Czech Republic	17
29	1994	Birmingham	England	17
30	1995	Helsinki	Finland	17
31	1996	Paris	France	17
32	1997	Santa Cruz de Tenerife	Spain	17
33	1998	Belgrade	(Federal Republic of Yugoslavia) Yugoslavia	17
34	1999	Euboea	Greece	17
35	2000	Istanbul	Turkey	17
36	2001	Sofia	Bulgaria	17
37	2002	Tallinn	Estonia	17
38	2003	Bremen	Germany	17
39	2004	Moscow	Russia	17
40	2005	Tenerife	Spain	17
41	2006	Stavanger	Norway	17
42	2007	Bratislava	Slovakia	17
43	2008	Tallinn	Estonia	17
44	2009	Zagreb	Croatia	16
45	2010	Athens	Greece	16
46	2011	Zürich	Switzerland	16
47	2012	Santa Cruz de Tenerife	Spain	16
48	2013	Budapest	Hungary	16
49	2014	Tampere	Finland	16
50	2015	Istanbul	Turkey	16
51	2016	Montpellier	France	16
52	2017	Kocaeli	Turkey	16
Para Karate
53	2018	Novi Sad	Serbia	16 + 6
54	2019	Guadalajara	Spain	16 + 6
55	2020	Baku	Azerbaijan	Cancelled
56	2021	Poreč	Croatia	16 + 8
57	2022	Gaziantep	Turkey	16 + 8
58	2023	Guadalajara	Spain	16 + 8
59	2024	Zadar	Croatia	16 + 8
60	2025	Yerevan	Armenia	16 + 8
61	2026	Frankfurt	Germany	16 + 8
62	2027	Paris	France	-
63	2028	Podgorica	Montenegro	-
Total (2025)				774 + 52

== Medals ==
=== All-time medal table Karate (1966–2025) ===
The following reflects the all-time medal counts as of the 1966 European Karate Championships:

Rank	Nation	Gold	Silver	Bronze	Total
1	France	171	101	205	477
2	Spain	149	117	137	403
3	Italy	117	128	154	399
4	Turkey	70	63	123	256
5	Great Britain	63	66	77	206
6	Germany	42	33	121	196
7	Netherlands	35	23	51	109
8	Croatia	24	20	60	104
9	Azerbaijan	17	13	27	57
10	Greece	12	15	39	66
11	Finland	12	10	30	52
12	Switzerland	11	13	33	57
13	Ukraine	11	9	20	40
14	Georgia	10	7	21	38
15	Serbia	8	13	28	49
16	Sweden	7	11	31	49
17	Yugoslavia	7	10	24	41
18	Slovakia	7	9	22	38
19	Russia	6	15	30	51
20	Norway	6	5	9	20
21	Bosnia and Herzegovina	3	21	15	39
22	Austria	3	9	24	36
23	North Macedonia	3	4	17	24
24	Belgium	2	11	18	31
25	Czech Republic	2	9	21	32
26	Hungary	2	2	19	23
–	European Karate Federation-1	2	1	1	4
27	Slovenia	1	8	9	18
28	Latvia	1	3	4	8
29	Luxembourg	1	3	3	7
30	Albania	1	2	1	4
31	Montenegro	0	4	13	17
32	Poland	0	4	2	6
33	Bulgaria	0	2	6	8
34	Denmark	0	2	3	5
35	Portugal	0	1	8	9
36	Belarus	0	1	3	4
37	England	0	1	0	1
37	San Marino	0	1	0	1
39	Kosovo	0	0	4	4
40	Armenia	0	0	2	2
40	Israel	0	0	2	2
40	Romania	0	0	2	2
43	Cyprus	0	0	1	1
43	Estonia	0	0	1	1
Totals (44 entries)		806	770	1,421	2,997

=== All-time medal table Para Karate (2018–2025) ===
The following reflects the all-time medal counts as of the 2025 European Karate Championships:

Rank	Nation	Gold	Silver	Bronze	Total
1	Spain	18	9	11	38
2	Azerbaijan	6	6	3	15
3	Hungary	5	3	8	16
4	France	5	2	13	20
5	Italy	4	3	6	13
6	Croatia	4	3	5	12
7	Romania	3	2	1	6
8	Turkey	3	1	4	8
9	Germany	2	4	8	14
10	Russia	1	4	5	10
11	Czech Republic	1	0	3	4
12	Ukraine	0	4	1	5
13	Serbia	0	3	2	5
14	Estonia	0	2	2	4
14	Slovenia	0	2	2	4
16	Portugal	0	1	4	5
17	Georgia	0	1	1	2
18	Wales	0	1	0	1
19	Netherlands	0	0	3	3
20	England	0	0	2	2
–	European Karate Federation-1	0	0	2	2
21	Bosnia and Herzegovina	0	0	1	1
21	Latvia	0	0	1	1
Totals (22 entries)		52	51	88	191

=== Medals table Europe Cadet, Junior and U21 (2000–2023) ===
The following reflects the all-time medal counts as of the 2000 European Karate Cadet, Junior and U21 Championships:

Rank	Nation	Gold	Silver	Bronze	Total
1	Spain	97	50	81	228
2	France	92	70	117	279
3	Turkey	92	50	129	271
4	Italy	81	74	114	269
5	Russia	32	34	74	140
6	Azerbaijan	29	8	30	67
7	Slovakia	24	30	65	119
8	Germany	22	31	67	120
9	Croatia	18	42	66	126
10	Ukraine	17	15	29	61
11	Greece	15	16	51	82
12	Bosnia and Herzegovina	14	26	32	72
13	Netherlands	14	10	20	44
14	Serbia	12	30	43	85
15	Great Britain	12	28	58	98
16	Hungary	12	17	32	61
17	Denmark	9	15	17	41
18	Belgium	8	13	28	49
19	North Macedonia	8	10	25	43
20	Montenegro	8	8	25	41
21	Switzerland	6	9	16	31
22	Portugal	5	10	25	40
23	Estonia	5	2	4	11
24	Latvia	4	5	8	17
24	Luxembourg	4	5	8	17
26	Bulgaria	3	4	13	20
27	Austria	3	1	15	19
28	Belarus	2	11	25	38
29	Czech Republic	2	10	23	35
30	Poland	2	3	14	19
31	Georgia	2	3	6	11
32	Sweden	2	2	8	12
33	Moldova	2	1	0	3
34	Slovenia	1	10	15	26
35	Serbia and Montenegro	1	3	5	9
36	Scotland	1	2	1	4
37	Israel	1	1	4	6
37	Kosovo	1	1	4	6
39	Cyprus	1	1	2	4
40	Romania	1	0	6	7
41	Albania	0	1	4	5
42	Armenia	0	1	3	4
43	Norway	0	0	19	19
44	Finland	0	0	3	3
Totals (44 entries)		665	663	1,334	2,662

== See also ==
- fr:Championnats d'Europe de karaté juniors et cadets (in French)
