= Kia Ceed =

Small family car produced by Kia

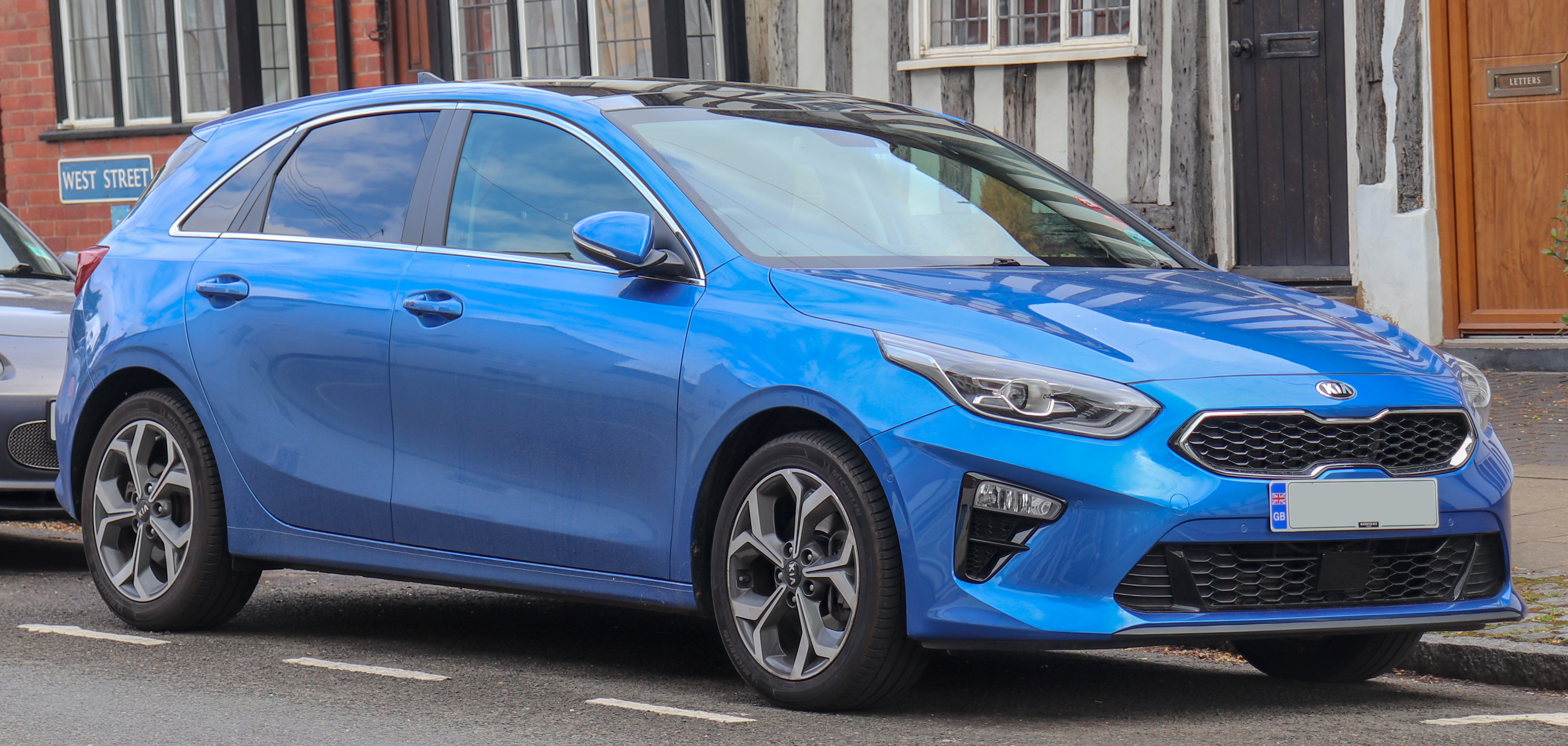
- 2018 Kia Ceed First Edition (UK)

Overview
- Manufacturer: Kia
- Also called: Kia Cee'd (2006–2018)
- Production: 2006–present
- Assembly: Slovakia: Žilina (KMS)

Body and chassis
- Class: Compact car/small family car (C)
- Layout: Front-engine, front-wheel-drive
- Related: Hyundai i30

Chronology
- Predecessor: Kia Spectra
- Successor: Kia K4 Hatchback / Sportswagon (For Ceed, Ceed SW, & Proceed)

The Kia Ceed (known as the Kia Cee'd before 2018) is a compact car/small family car (C-segment) produced by the South Korean manufacturer Kia since October 2006 exclusively for the European market.

It is the first Kia vehicle to be designed entirely in Europe and tailored to European customers. To mark the occasion, Kia took the initials of the European Economic Community, EEC or CEE in several languages and added ED for European Design. Realizing that "CEEED" had too many ‘E's, they replaced the last 'E' with an apostrophe, with 'Cee'd' being the end result. Since 2018, the Ceed name no longer has an apostrophe. The initials now mean "Community of Europe, with European Design". The model is primarily made at the Kia Motors Slovakia assembly plant in Žilina. The Ceed replaced the Cerato which had little success in Europe.

The Ceed was first unveiled on 28 September 2006 at the Paris Motor Show. In mid-2007, a station wagon version called the Cee'd sw was launched followed by the three-door Pro Cee'd in late 2007. From 2009 to 2010, Kia dropped the apostrophe of the Pro Cee'd and changed the model name to Pro Ceed. The second generation of the Cee'd was presented at the 2012 Geneva Motor Show. At the 2018 Geneva Motor Show, Kia presented the third generation Ceed. In early 2019, a shooting brake version of the Ceed was launched, called the Proceed. In June 2019, Kia also unveiled the XCeed, a crossover SUV version of the car.

As of 2023, the Ceed is positioned between the K3 supermini (B-segment) and the K5 large family car (D-segment).

As of January 2026, the Ceed hatchback, Ceed Sportswagon and Proceed are replaced by the K4 hatchback and sportswagon, while the XCeed SUV will be continued on production.

== First generation (ED; 2006) ==
First generation
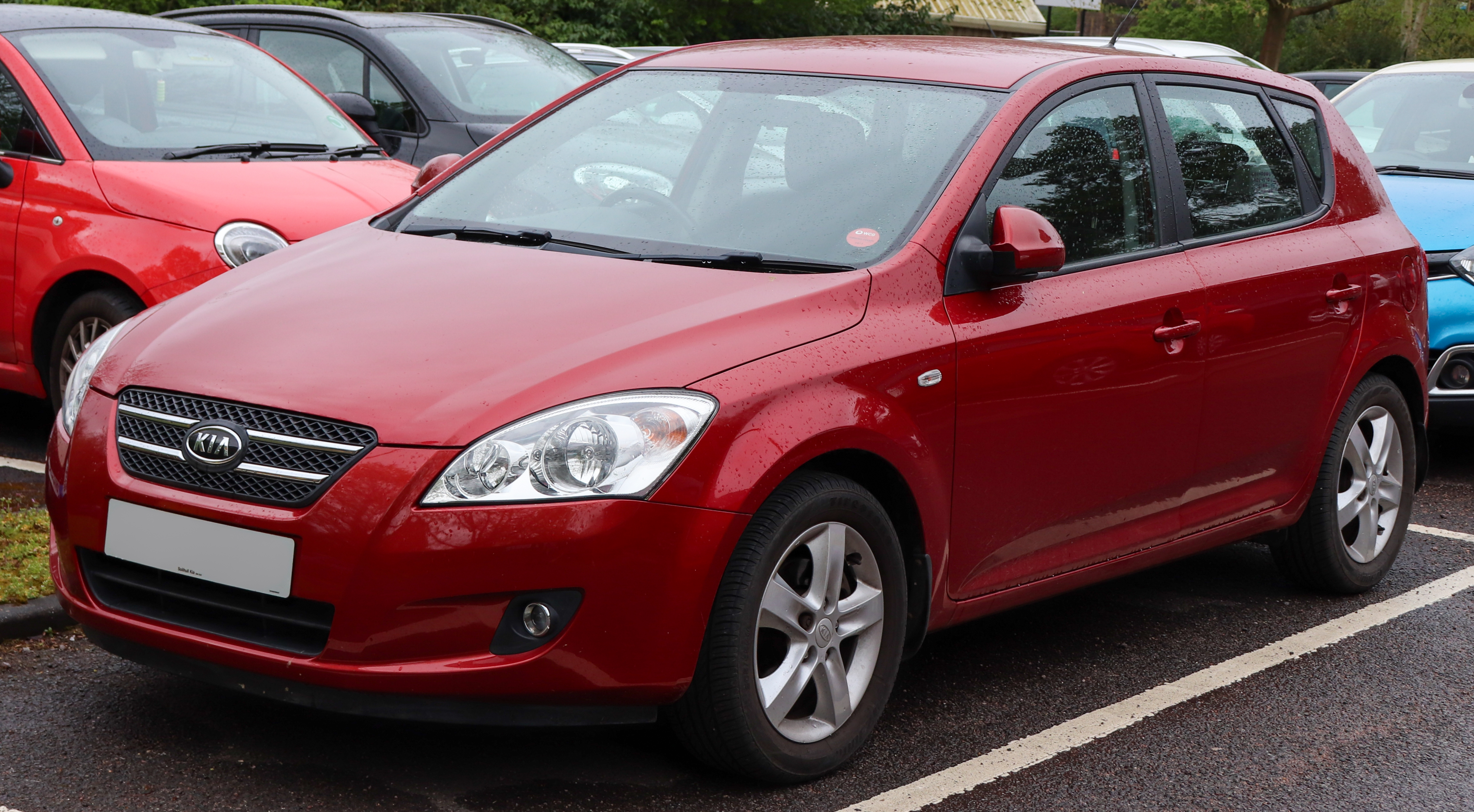
- Kia Cee'd (pre-facelift)

Overview
- Model code: ED
- Production: 2006–2012
- Assembly: Slovakia: Žilina (Kia Motors Slovakia)
- Designer: Gregory Guillaume; Miklós Kovács

Body and chassis
- Body style: 3-door hatchback (Pro Cee'd); 5-door hatchback 5-door station wagon (Cee'd SW)
- Platform: Hyundai-Kia J4 platform
- Related: Kia Forte/Cerato (TD); Hyundai i30 (FD); Hyundai Elantra (HD)

Powertrain
- Engine: Petrol: 1.4 L Gamma CVVT I4; 1.6 L Gamma CVVT I4; 2.0 L Beta II CVVT I4; Diesel: 1.6 L U CRDi-VGT I4 (turbo diesel); 2.0 L D CRDi-VGT I4 (turbo)
- Transmission: 5-speed manual 6-speed manual 4-speed automatic

Dimensions
- Wheelbase: 2,650 mm (104.3 in)
- Length: 4,240 mm (166.9 in); 4,250 mm (167.3 in) (Pro cee'd); 4,470 mm (176.0 in) (cee'd SW)
- Width: 1,790 mm (70.5 in)
- Height: 1,480 mm (58.3 in); 1,450 mm (57.1 in) (Pro cee'd); 1,530 mm (60.2 in) (cee'd SW)
- Kerb weight: 1,263–1,572 kg (2,784–3,466 lb)

The Cee'd was designed in Frankfurt, Germany, with Miklós Kovács leading the design team, while the concept car was designed by Pontus Fontaeus. The cee'd is developed on the same platform as the Hyundai i30. The first generation was available with a choice of four engines (two petrol and two diesel), five trim levels and either manual or automatic transmission.

There were three trim levels available: LX, EX, TX. The flagship TX trim was equipped with semi leather seats, Michelin 225/45 tires with 17 inch alloy wheels and rear parking sensors. All versions have six airbags as standard, active front headrests, height-adjustable headrests, pretensioners, ABS, EBD, BA, and a reinforced structure of the cabin. Upon release on the market, the warranty is one of the most extensive and longest in Europe with seven years or 150,000 km for the powertrain and five years for the entire vehicle.

Approximately 646,300 units of the first-generation Cee'd were produced.

=== Body styles ===
Kia Pro_cee'd

The Pro_cee'd is the sports version of the Kia Cee'd, with a 3-door body and a new rear-end design. The concept car was showcased for first time at the Paris Motor Show in 2006. Apart from the three-door hatchback body, the car is given a lower stance compared to the original 5-door Cee'd as it is 5 cm lower and 5 cm longer. The official pictures of the production version were released in July 2007.

Kia Cee'd Sportswagon

The Cee'd Sportswagon is the station wagon of the Cee'd. It is the only version that features the 2.0-litre CRDi engine. The claimed boot space is 534 L (18.9 cu ft) with the rear seats unfolded and 1,664 L (58.8 cu ft) with the seats folded down.

=== Pre-facelift ===
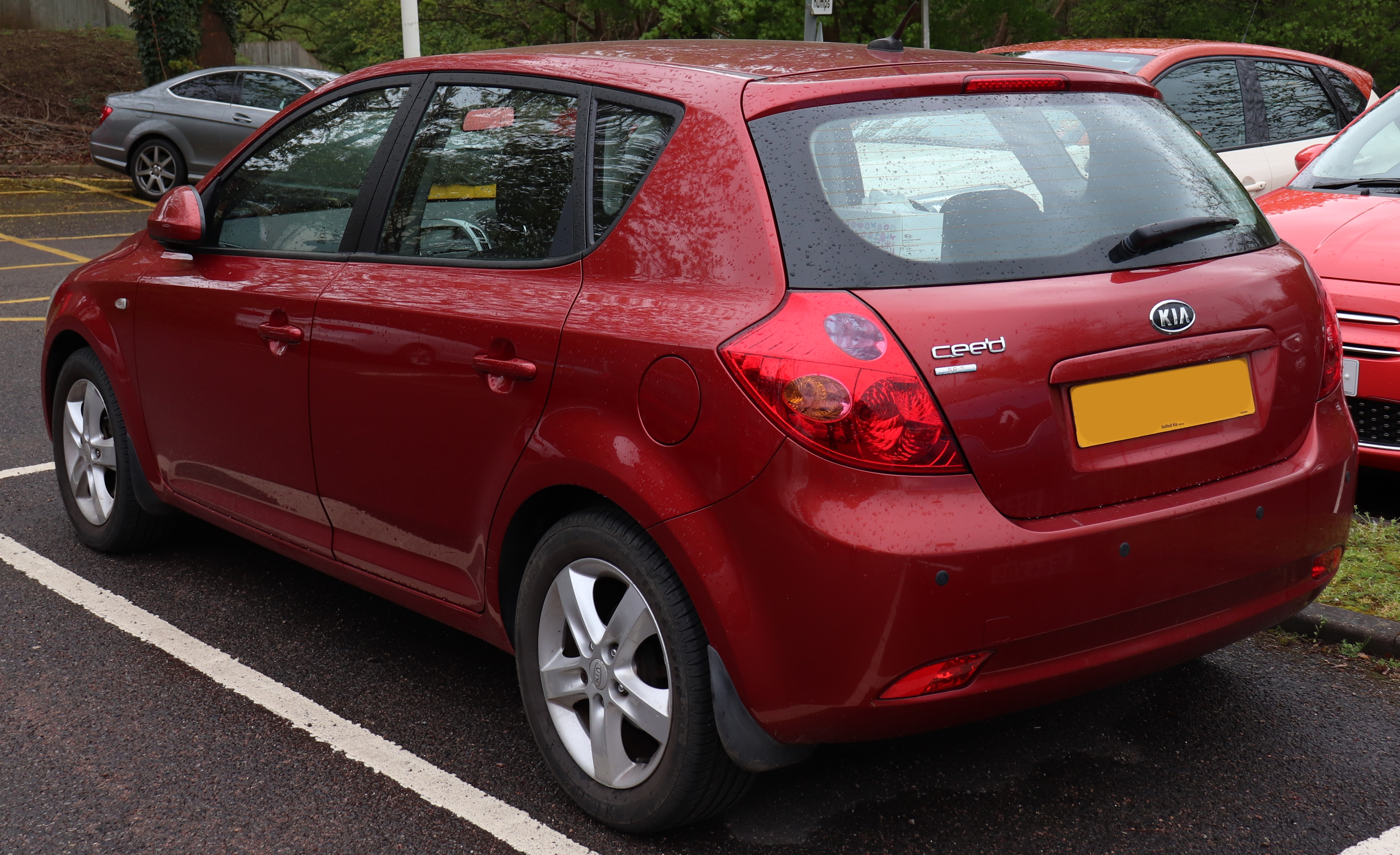
Kia Cee'd (pre-facelift)

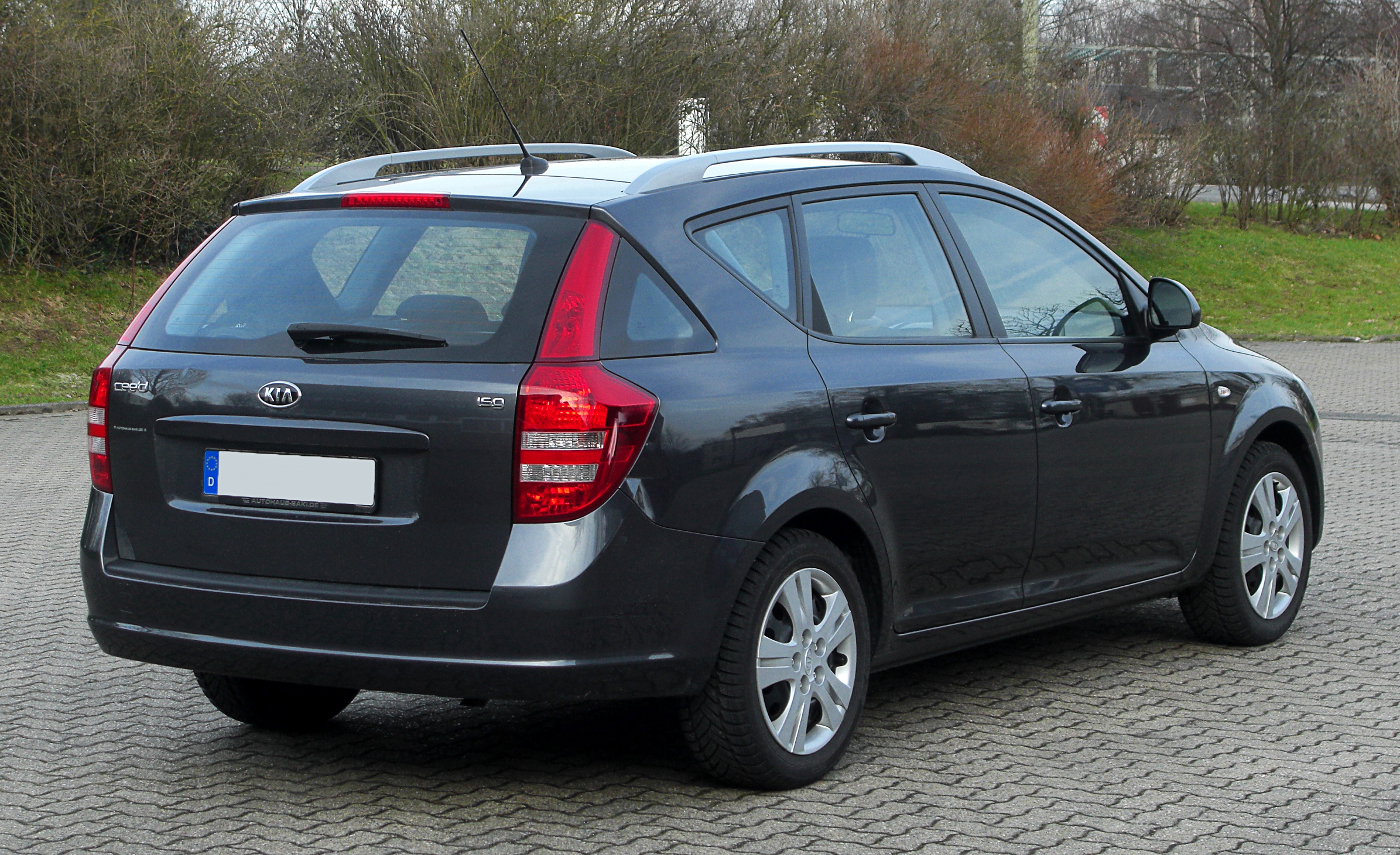
Kia Cee'd SW (pre-facelift)

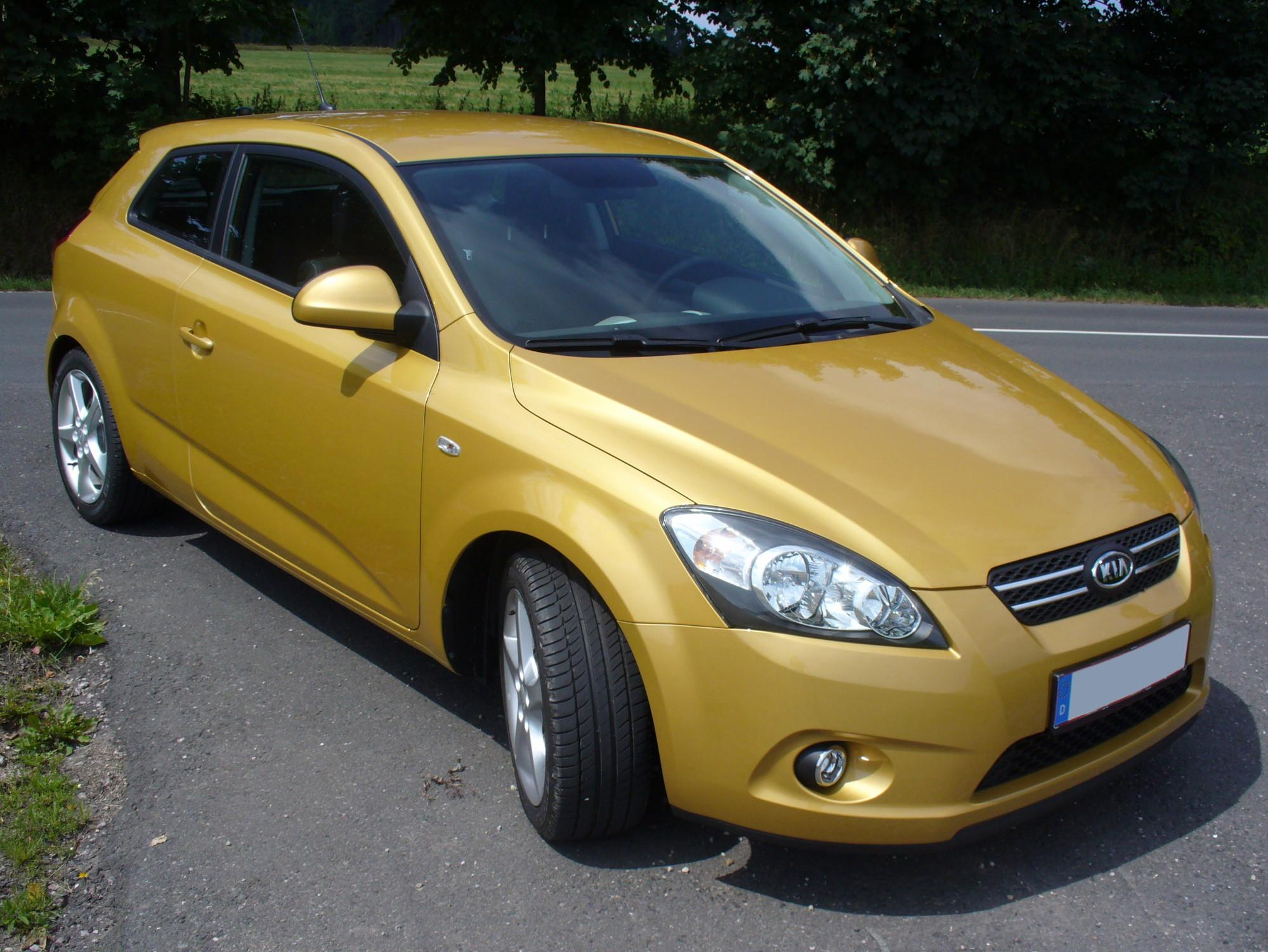
Kia Pro_cee'd (pre-facelift)

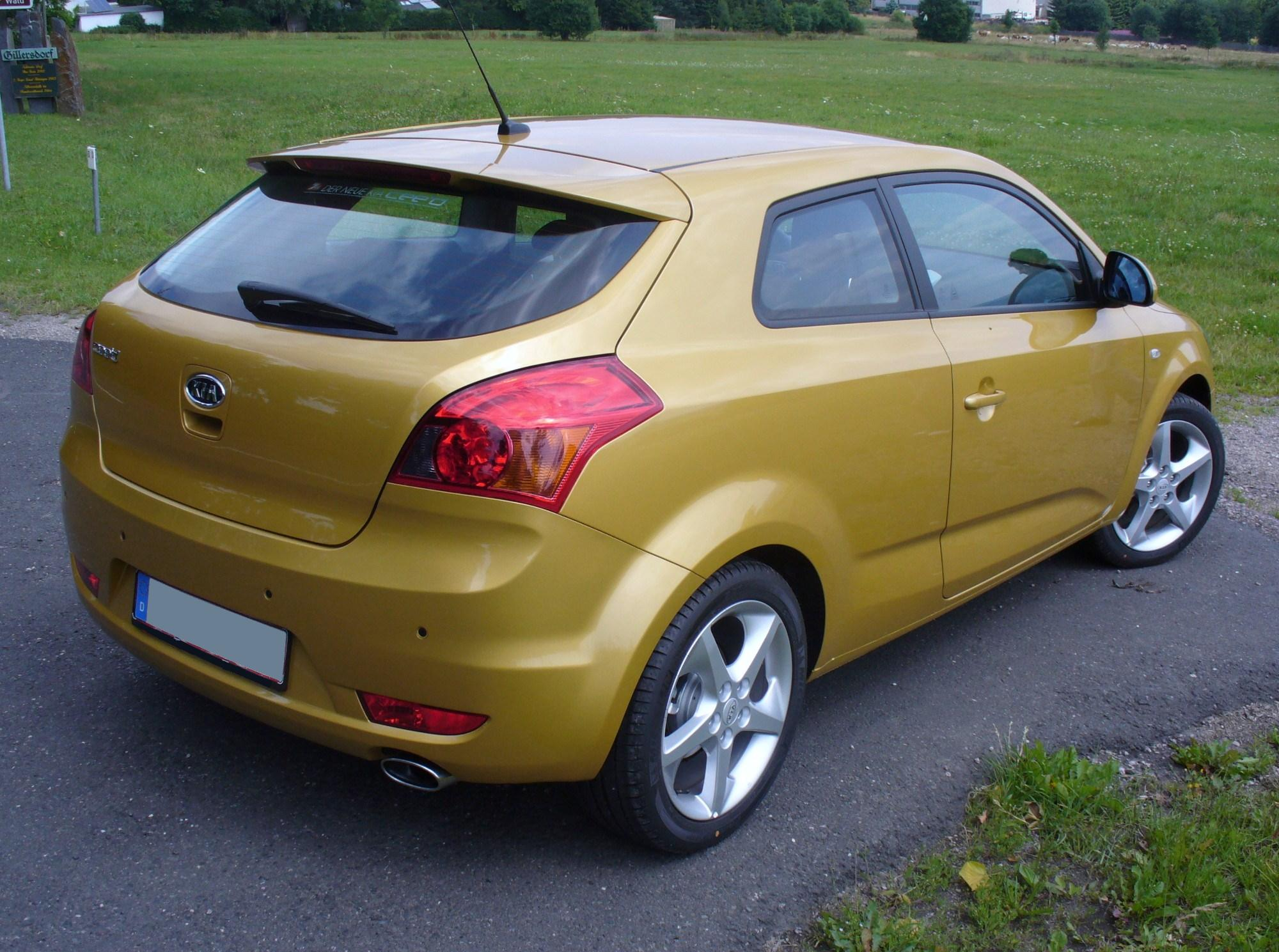
Kia Pro_cee'd (pre-facelift)

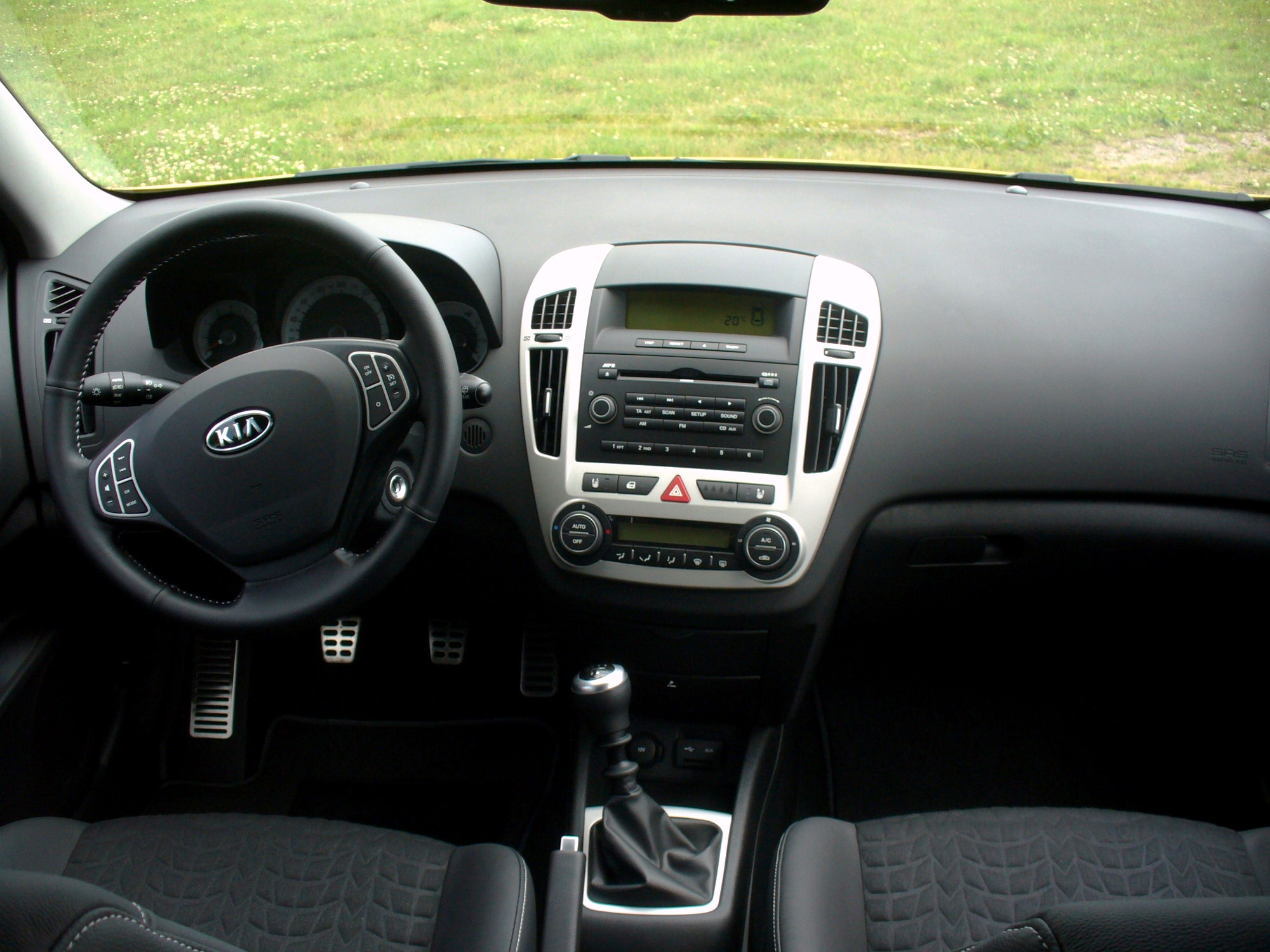
Interior

=== Facelift ===
In September 2009, the facelifted model was unveiled at the 63rd Frankfurt Motor Show. While the five-door and the station wagon were given an updated front and rear design, including the Kia's new corporate grille called the Tiger Nose, technical revisions and minor changes in the interior, the three-door version exterior was not updated.

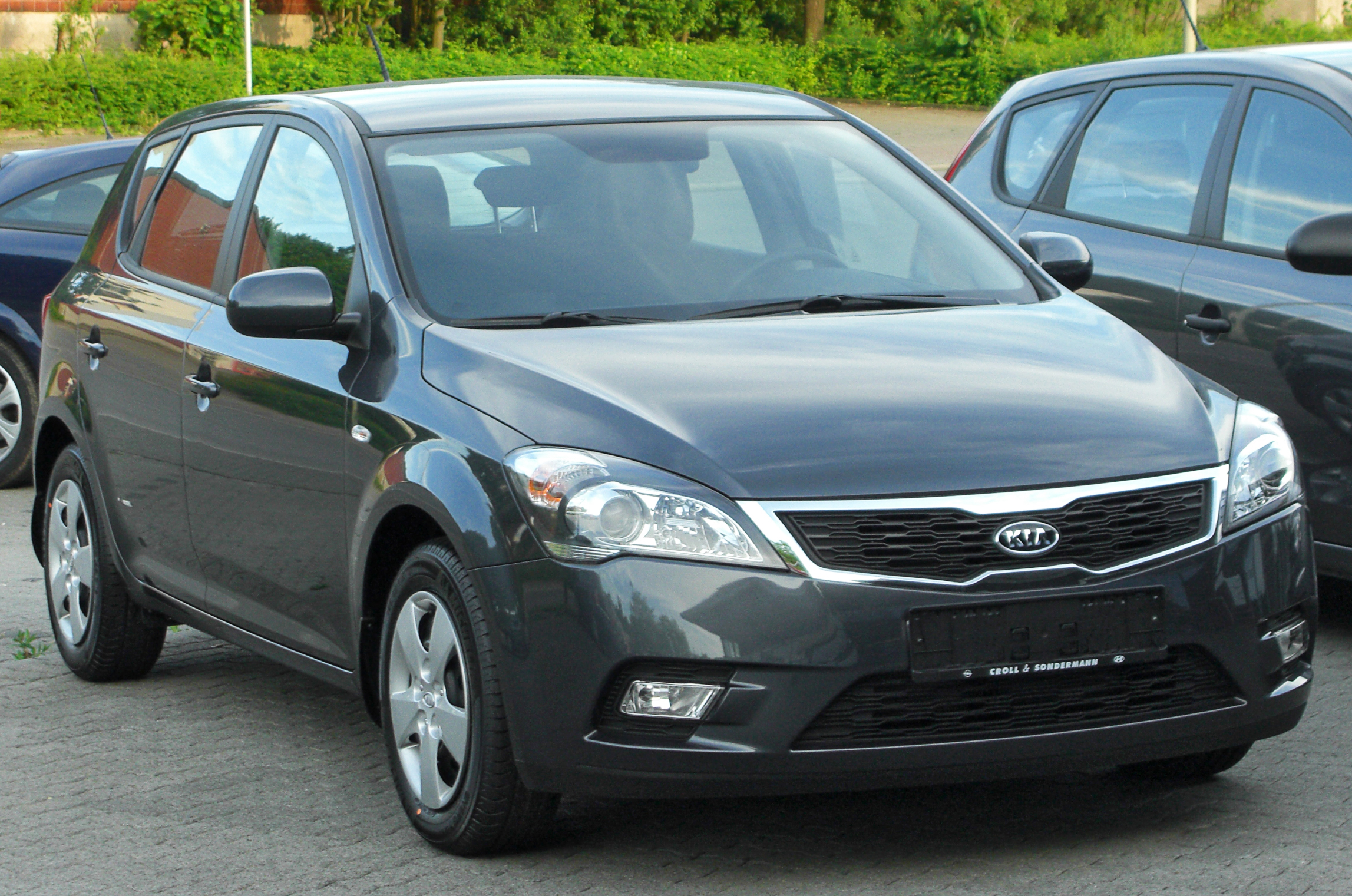
Facelift Kia Cee'd (front)

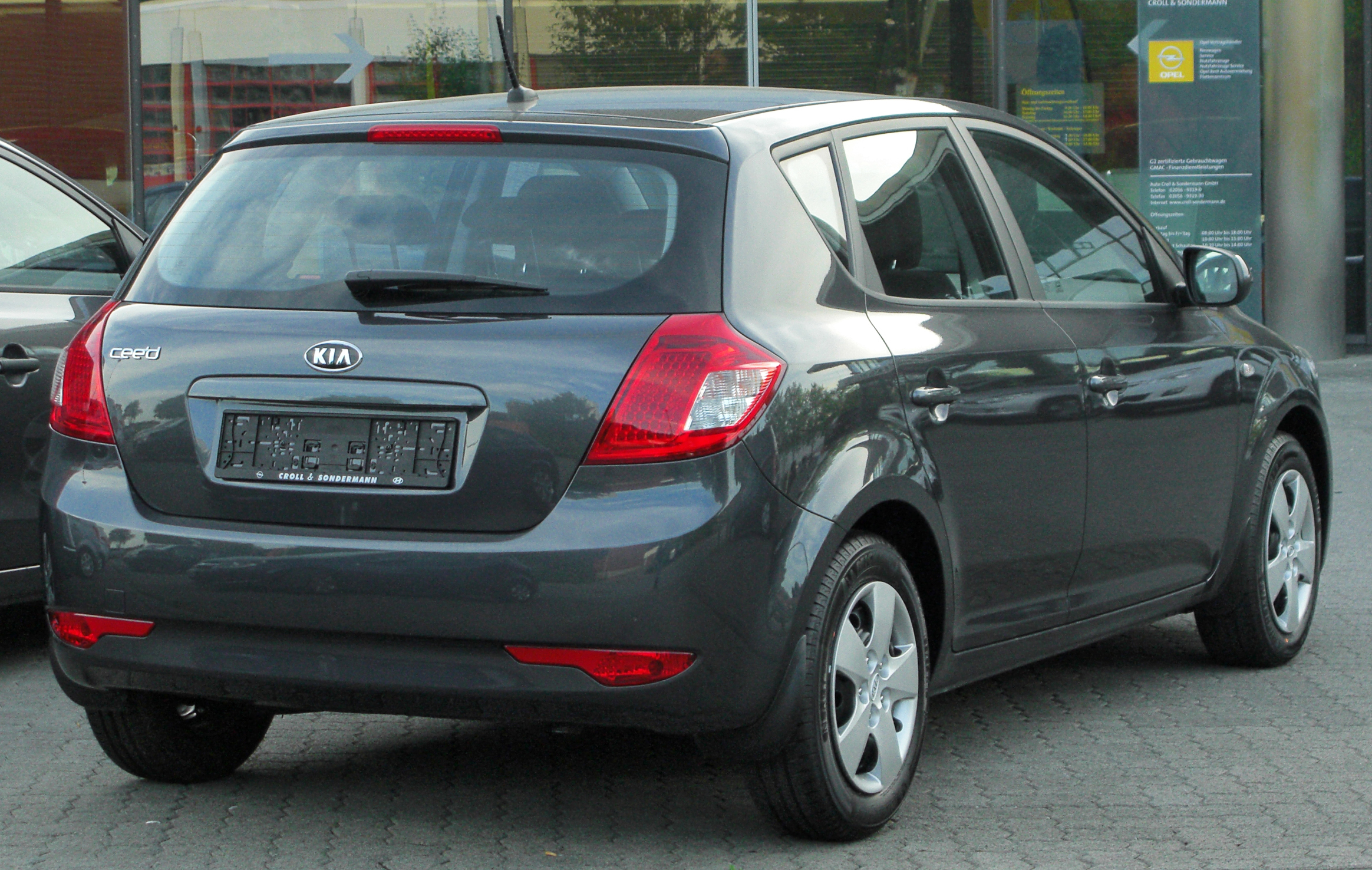
Facelift Kia Cee'd (rear)

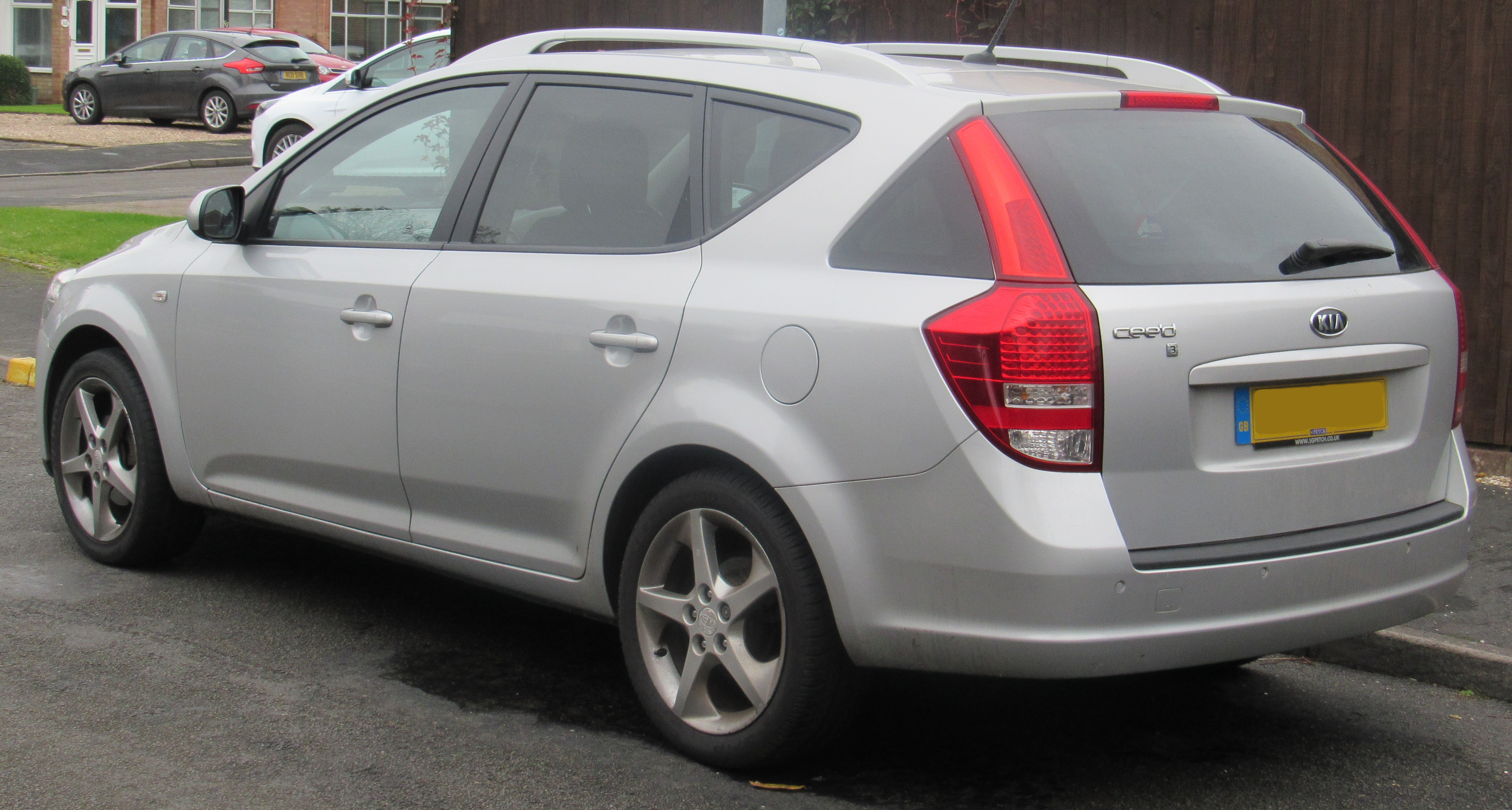
Facelift Kia Cee'd SW

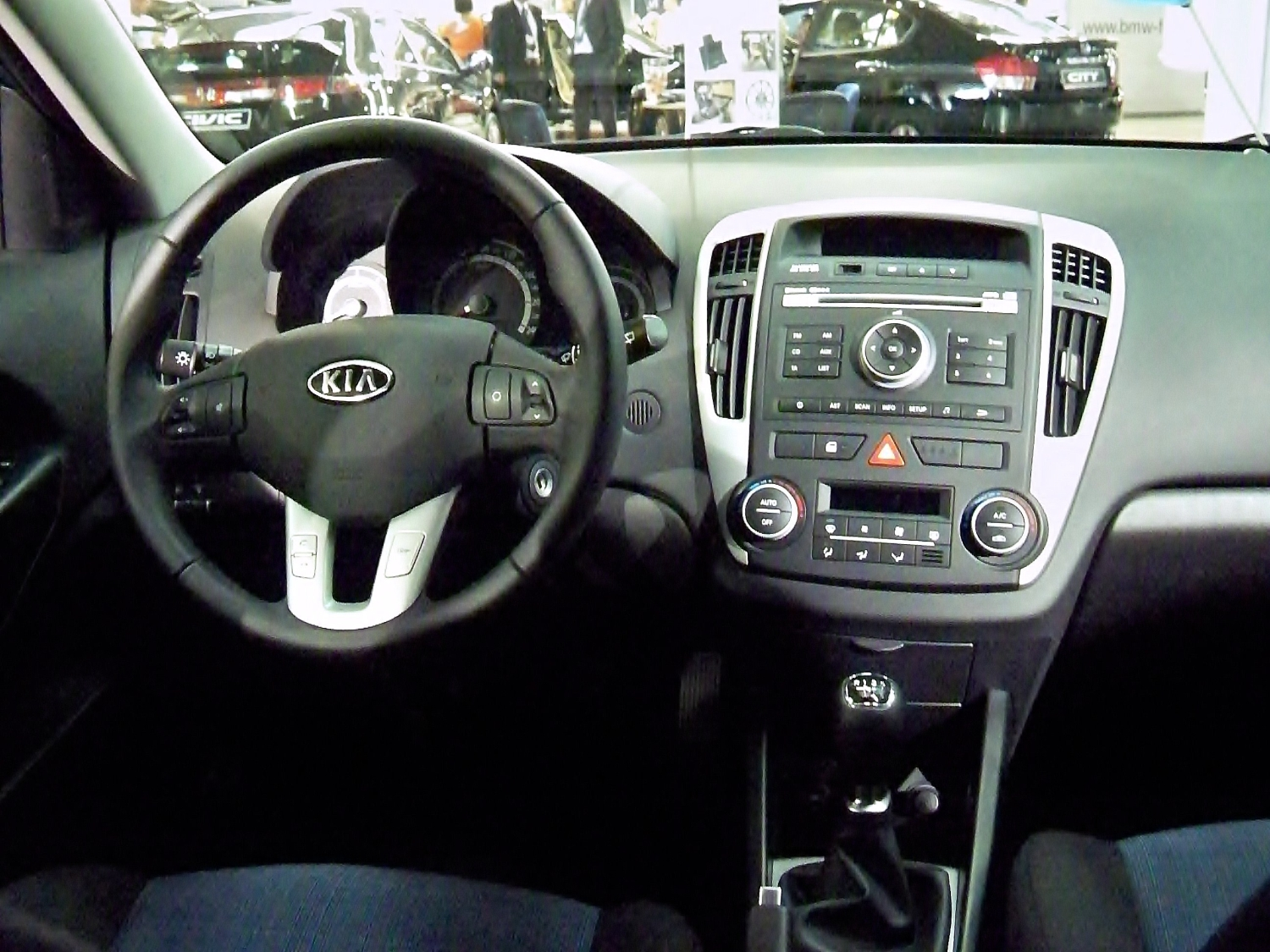
Facelift interior

=== Safety ===
The Kia Cee'd earned a Euro NCAP 5 star safety rating for adult occupants for the pre 2009 model. It is also fitted with six airbags (including curtain airbags) as standard even in countries like Ukraine where safety options were usually stripped in comparison with other countries.

The Euro NCAP results also showed that the dashboard can become a threat to the driver and passenger's knees in the event of a front collision, despite having 6 airbags in the car and the Cee'd also scored the maximum available points for the side impact and pole tests.

Euro NCAP test results* Kia Cee'd 1.6 GLS (LHD) (2007)
Test	Score	Rating
Adult occupant:	34	5 /5 stars
Child occupant:	37	4 /5 stars
Pedestrian:	11	2 /4 stars

== Second generation (JD; 2012) ==
Second generation
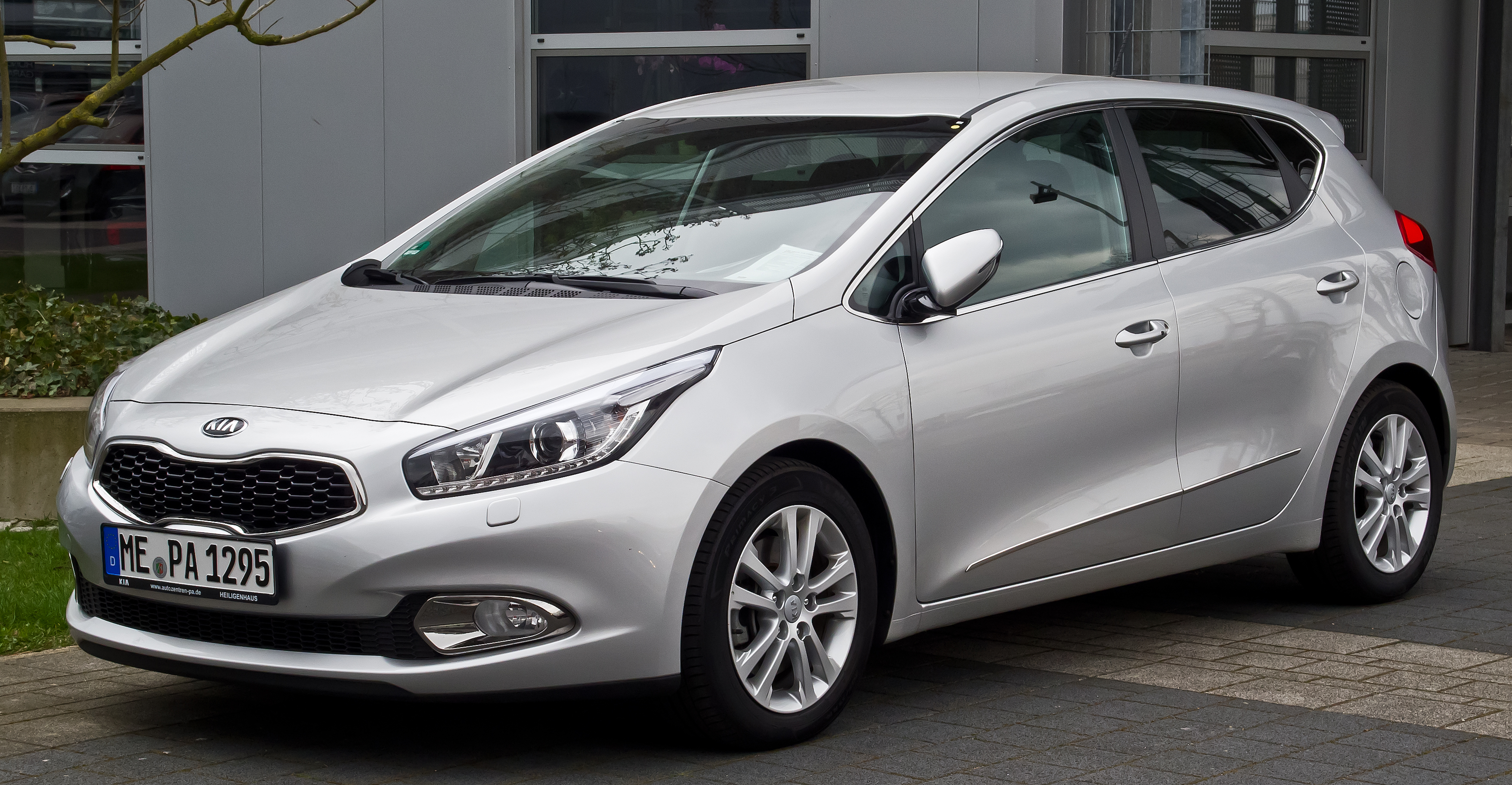
- Kia Cee'd hatchback (pre-facelift)

Overview
- Model code: JD
- Production: 2012–2018
- Assembly: Slovakia: Žilina (Kia Motors Slovakia); Russia: Kaliningrad (Avtotor)
- Designer: Peter Schreyer

Body and chassis
- Body style: 3-door hatchback (Pro Cee'd); 5-door hatchback 5-door station wagon (Cee'd SW)
- Platform: Hyundai-Kia J5 platform
- Related: Kia Forte/Cerato (YD); Hyundai i30 (GD); Hyundai Elantra (MD/UD)

Powertrain
- Engine: Petrol: 1.0 L Kappa II T-GDi I3; 1.4 L Gamma MPi I4; 1.4 L Kappa II MPi I4; 1.6 L Gamma MPi I4; 1.6 L Gamma GDi I4; 1.6 L Gamma T-GDi I4; Diesel: 1.4 L U II CRDi I4; 1.6 L U II CRDi I4
- Transmission: 6-speed manual 6-speed automatic 7-speed DCT

Dimensions
- Wheelbase: 2,650 mm (104.3 in)
- Length: 4,310 mm (169.7 in); 4,505 mm (177.4 in) (SW)
- Width: 1,780 mm (70.1 in)
- Height: 1,470 mm (57.9 in) (hatchback); 1,430 mm (56.3 in) (Pro Cee'd); 1,485 mm (58.5 in) (SW)

Making its worldwide premiere at the 2012 Geneva Motor Show is the all-new second-generation Cee'd (with internal code JD) which is claimed to be more sophisticated, efficient, refined, better equipped with a more engaging driving experience than the first generation. The second-generation Cee'd is, however, significantly more expensive than the first generation and moves the Cee'd out of the "budget" market as noted by independent reviewers such as Honest John. With the new Cee'd, came Kia's first attempt of a hot hatch with the Pro Cee'd GT.

Approximately 647,700 units of the second-generation Cee'd were produced.

=== Pre-facelift ===
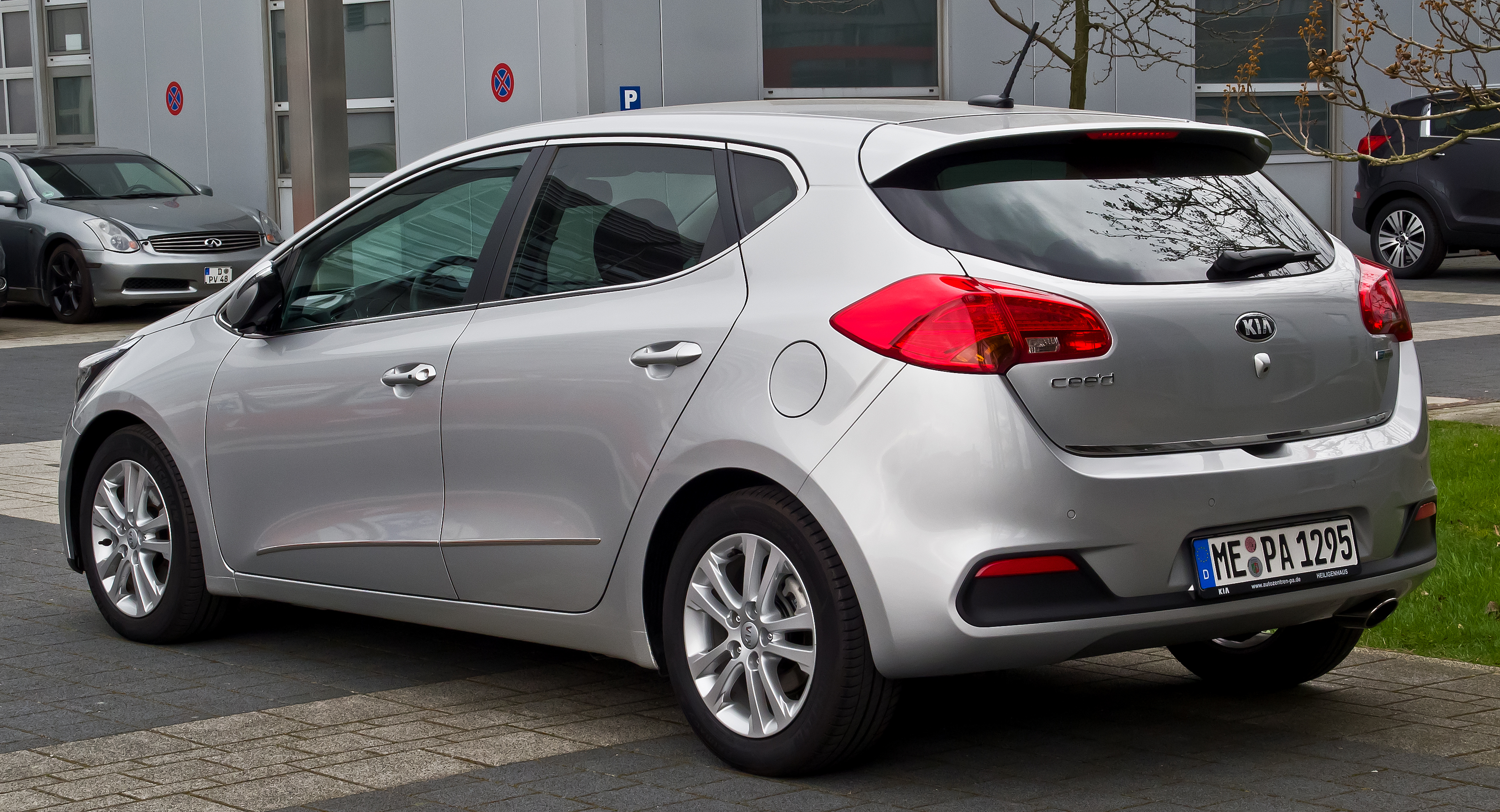
Kia Cee'd hatchback (pre-facelift)

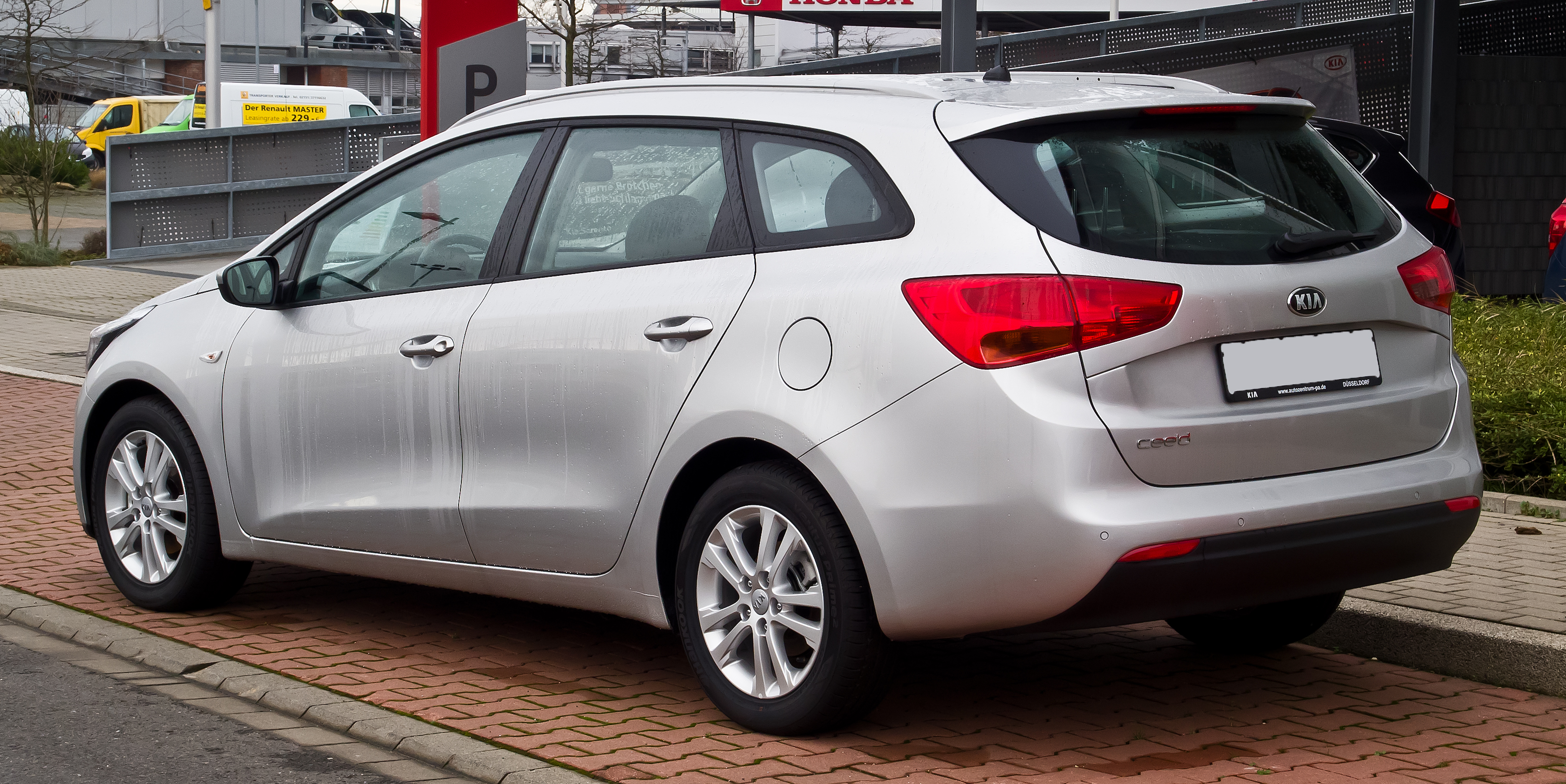
Kia Cee'd SW 1.4 CVVT Edition 7

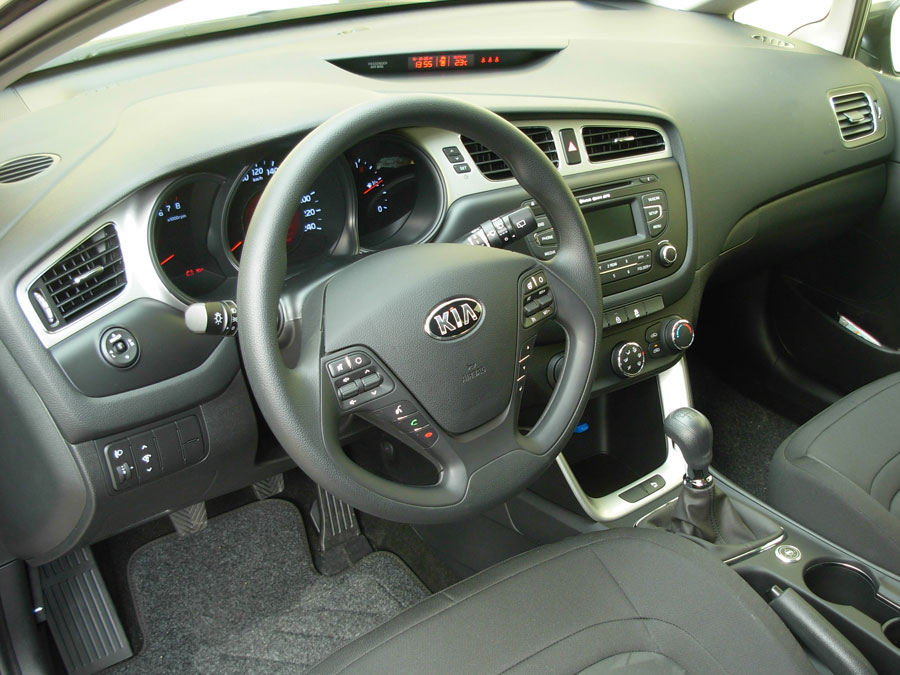
Interior (pre-facelift)

=== Facelift ===
First shown in June 2015, a facelifted model of the Cee'd went on sale in September of the same year.

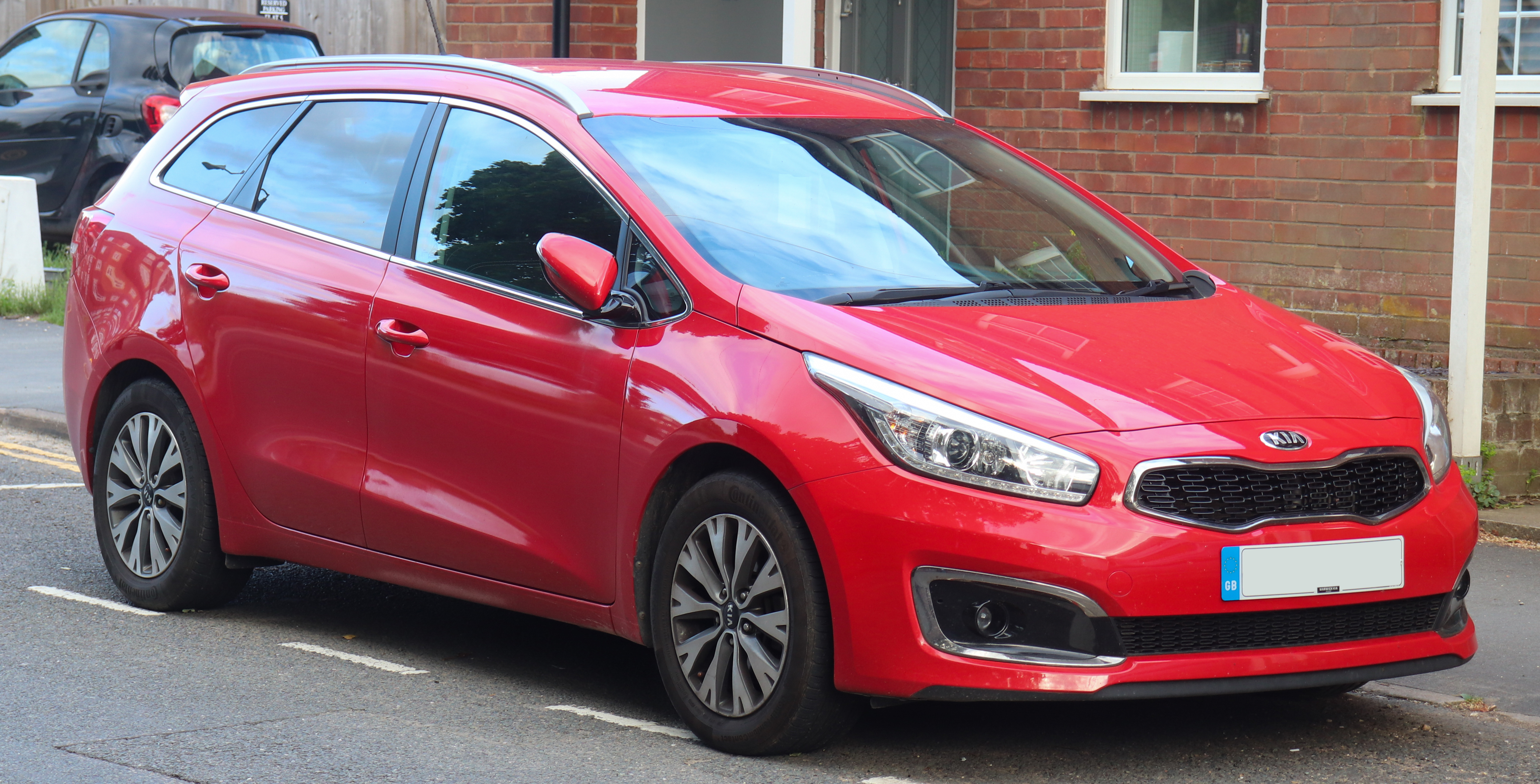
Kia Cee'd SW (facelift)

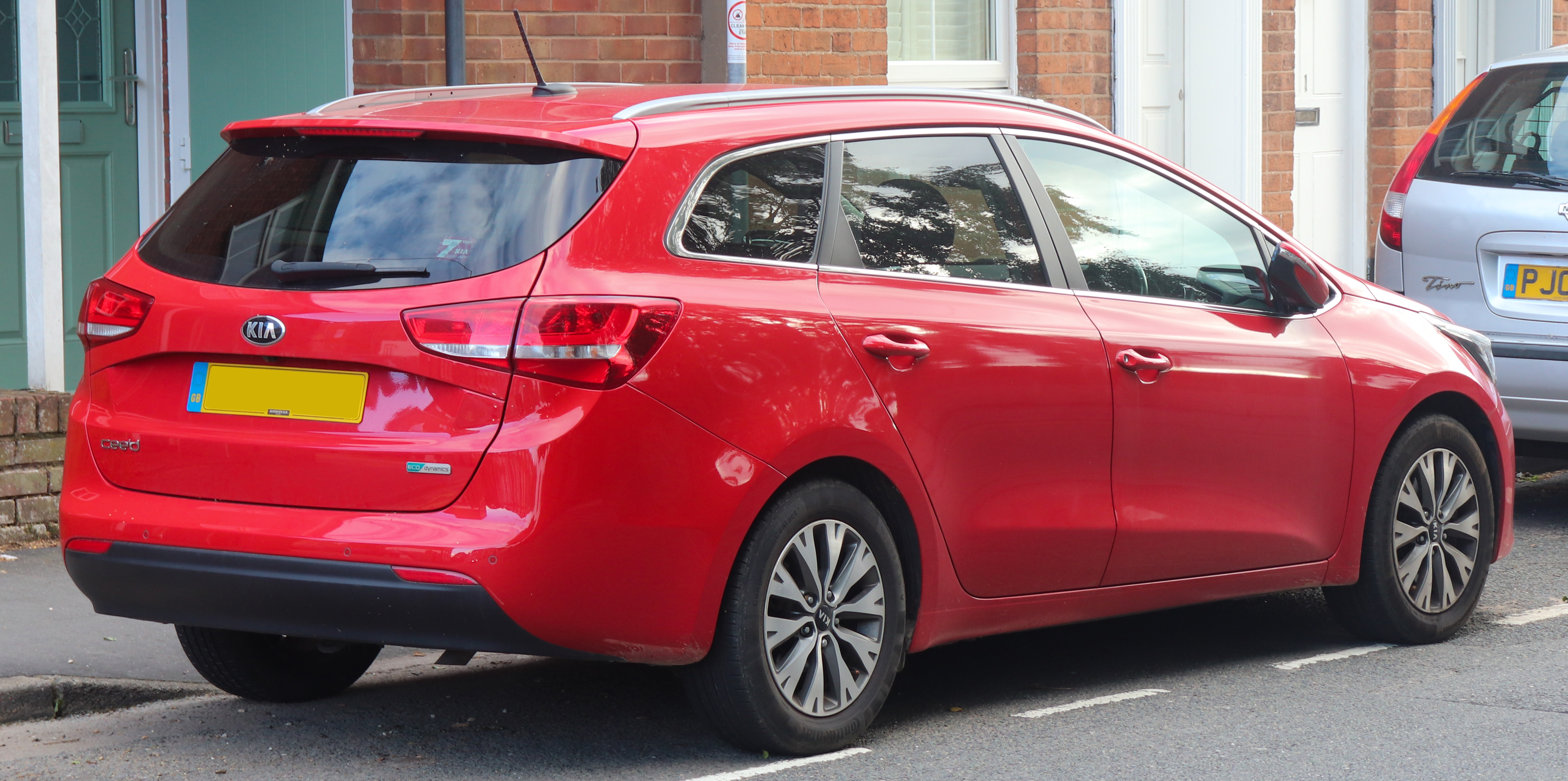
Kia Cee'd SW (facelift)

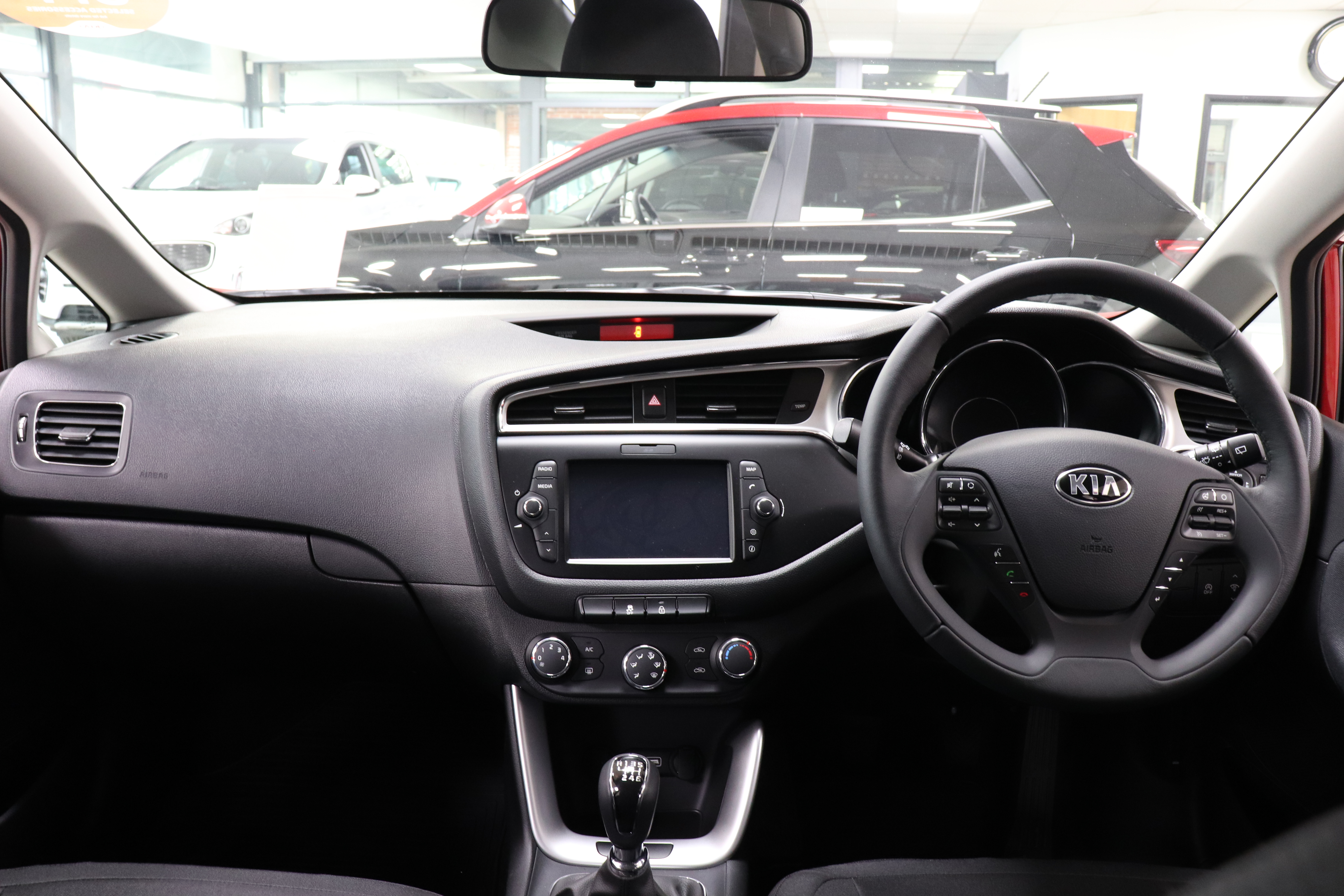
Interior (facelift)

=== Pro_Cee'd GT and Cee'd GT ===
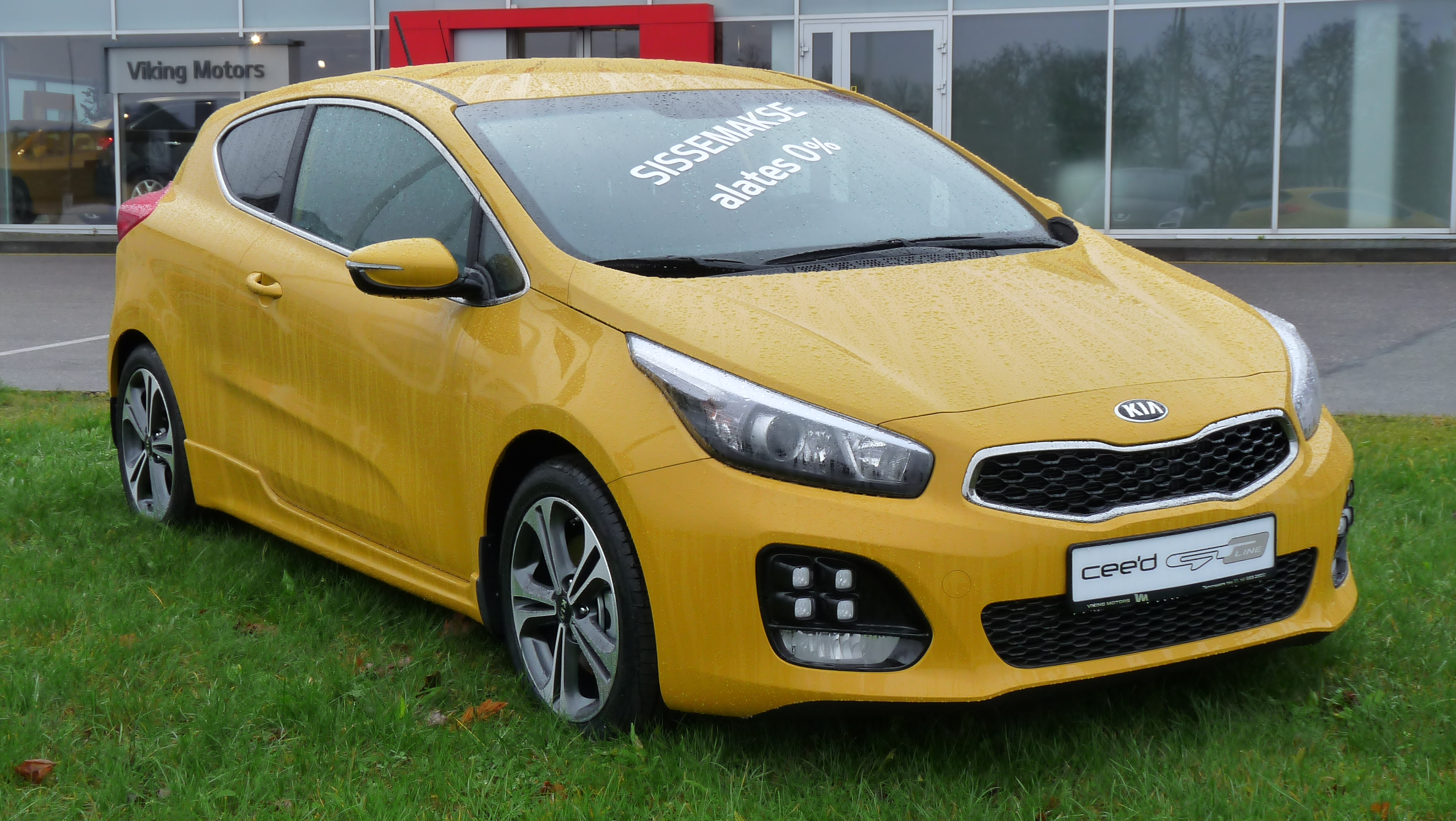

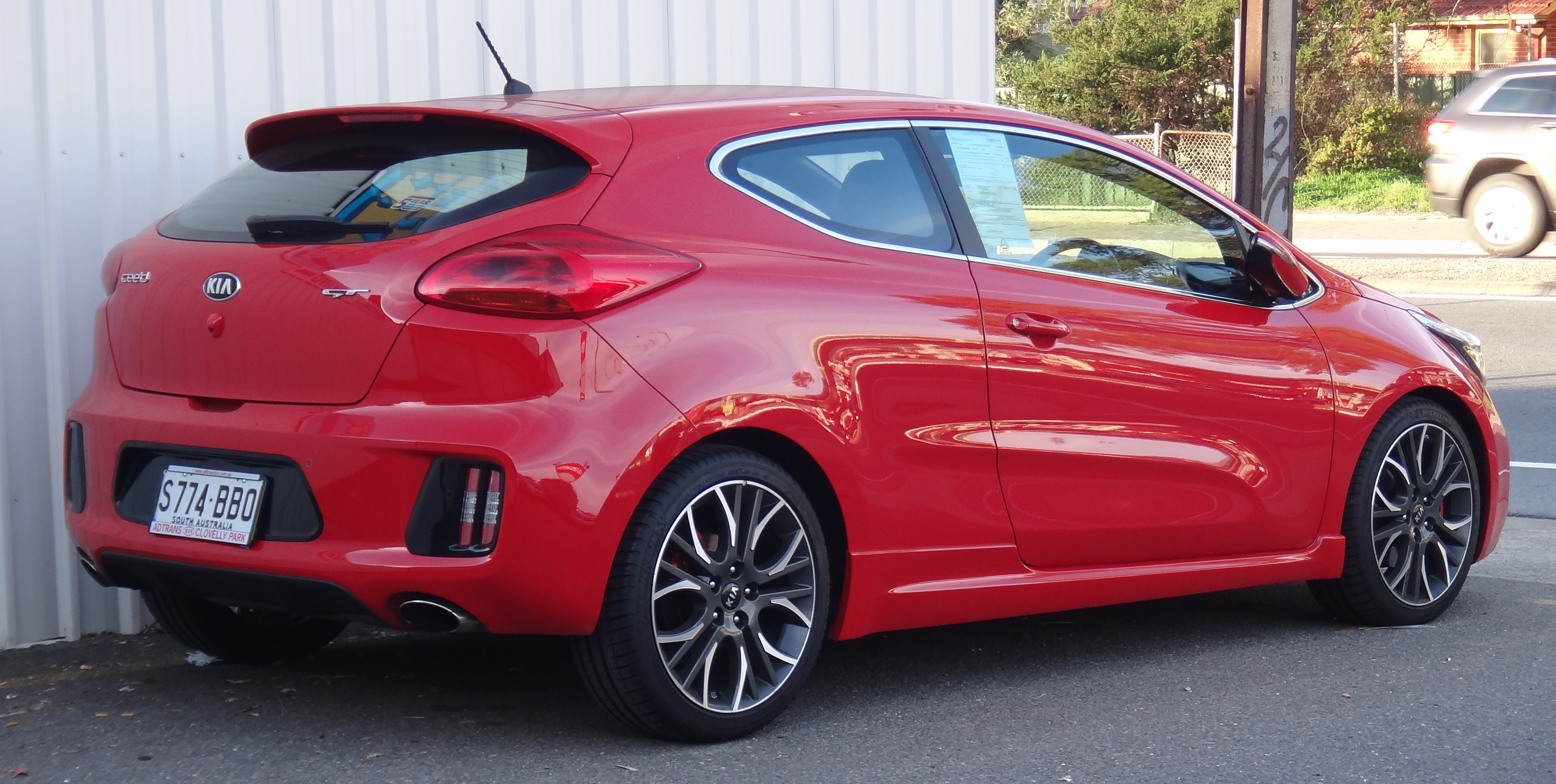
Kia Pro Cee'd GT

Kia released the Pro_Cee'd GT in July 2013, while the 5-door Cee'd GT was released January 2014. The Pro_Cee'd GT is the company's first performance oriented car and the first European style "hot hatch" from a Korean manufacturer. It would act as a halo model for the rest of the range. It is also the first Kia sold in the UK with a turbo-charged petrol engine.

The Pro_Cee'd GT uses a variant of the T-GDi Gamma engine. The engine in the Pro_Cee'd GT is the same as that used in the American market Hyundai Veloster Turbo, but different gear ratios and more aggressive suspension have been used. The torque has also been increased to 265 N⋅m (195 lb⋅ft); though, where the standard T-GDi engine has all of its torque available between 1750 and 4500 rpm, the engine as used in the Pro_Cee'd GT has been altered slightly, having its full torque available between 1750 and 4600 rpm. The engine propels the car from 0-60 mph (97 km/h) in 7.4 seconds, 0.4 seconds faster than the Veloster Turbo with the same engine (albeit a with a lower tune). The suspension in the GT has been modified over the standard Pro_Cee'd, giving a far more agile and sporting ride.

A body kit has been fitted to give the car a more muscular stance. The rear bumper now includes a splitter and twin exhausts, whilst the front introduces a large air intake with red pinstripe, a gloss black grille with silver GT badge and distinctive LED "Ice Cube" daytime running lights—side skirts are also fitted. The car runs on 18-inch alloy wheels over the standard car's 17-inch wheels. The interior gains red accents including an overstitched GT badge on the bottom of the steering wheel, as well as leather and suede Recaro sports racing bucket seats and TFT instrument dial, allowing the driver to switch between an analogue speedometer and digital readout with boost pressure and torque meters.

=== Safety ===
Euro NCAP test results* Kia Cee'd 1.4 MPI LX (LHD) (2012)
Test	Points	%
Overall:	5 /5 stars	
Adult occupant:	32.1	89%
Child occupant:	43	88%
Pedestrian:	22	61%
Safety assist:	6	86%

ANCAP test results* Kia pro_cee'd all variants (2014)
Test	Score
Overall	5 /5 stars
Frontal offset	15.19/16
Side impact	16/16
Pole	2/2
Seat belt reminders	3/3
Whiplash protection	Good
Pedestrian protection	Adequate
Electronic stability control	Standard

== Third generation (CD; 2018) ==
Third generation
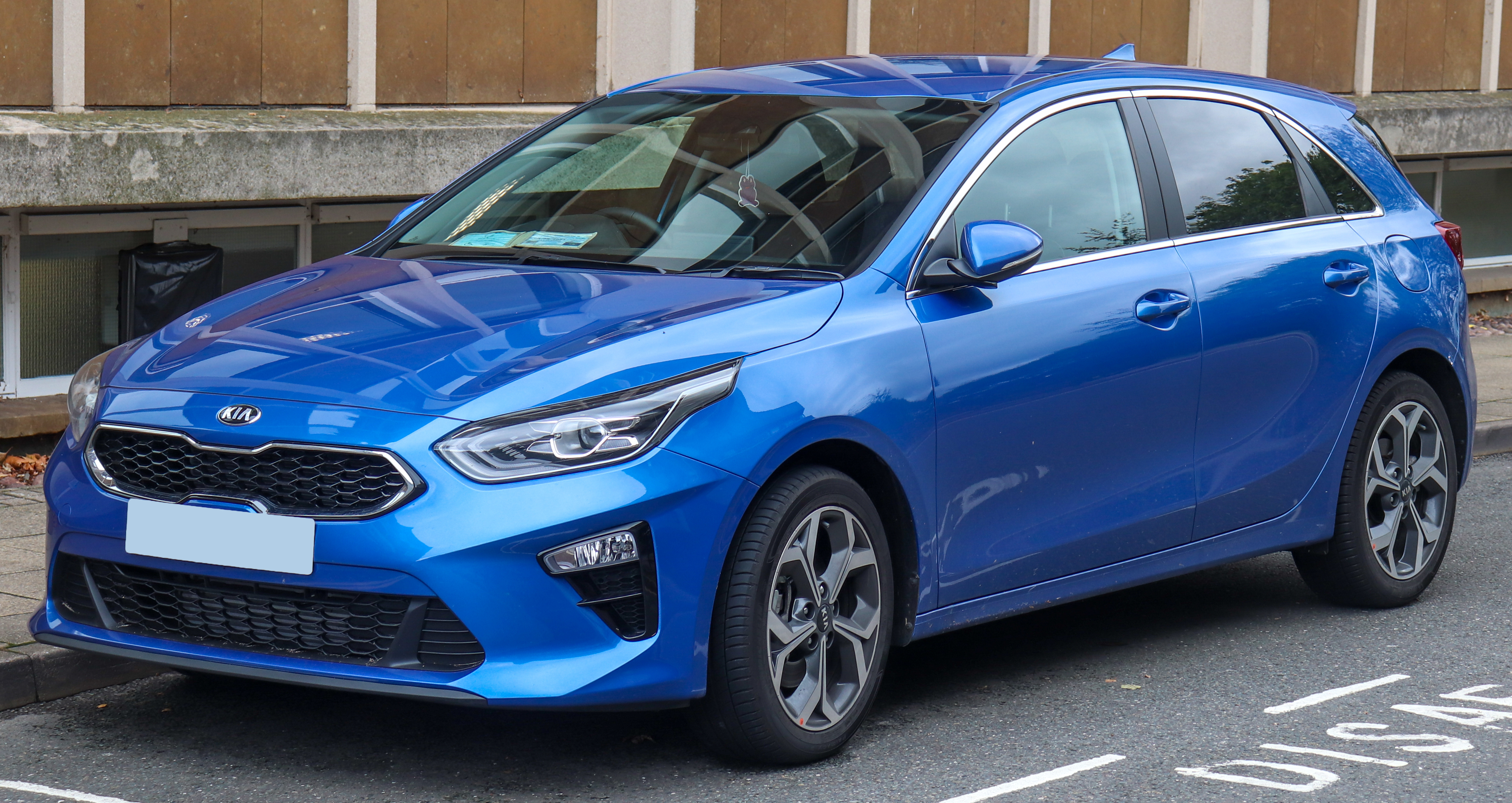
- 2019 Kia Ceed hatchback (pre-facelift)

Overview
- Model code: CD
- Production: May 2018 – January 2026 (Ceed); August 2018 – January 2026 (Ceed SW); November 2018 – December 2024 (Proceed); August 2019 – present (XCeed)
- Assembly: Slovakia: Žilina (Kia Motors Slovakia); Russia: Kaliningrad (Avtotor)
- Designer: Peter Schreyer

Body and chassis
- Body style: 5-door hatchback 5-door station wagon (Ceed SW); 5-door shooting brake (Proceed); 5-door SUV (XCeed)
- Platform: Hyundai-Kia K2 platform
- Related: Hyundai i30 (PD); Kia Forte/Cerato/K3 (BD)

Powertrain
- Engine: Petrol: 1.0 L Kappa II T-GDi I3; 1.0 L Smartstream G1.0 T-GDi I3; 1.4 L Kappa II T-GDi I4 (also 1.4 Hyundai Kappa MPI I4, producing 99bhp); 1.5 L Smartstream G1.5 T-GDi I4; 1.6 L Gamma II MPi I4; 1.6 L Gamma II T-GDi I4; Diesel: 1.6 L Smartstream D1.6 CRDi I4; 1.6 L Smartstream D1.6 CRDi I4 EcoDynamics+ (Mild Hybrid)
- Transmission: 6-speed manual 7-speed DCT
- Hybrid drivetrain: Mild Hybrid

Dimensions
- Wheelbase: 2,650 mm (104.3 in)
- Length: 4,310 mm (169.7 in) (hatchback); 4,605 mm (181.3 in) (Proceed); 4,600 mm (181.1 in) (SW); 4,395 mm (173.0 in) (XCeed)
- Width: 1,800 mm (70.9 in); 1,826 mm (71.9 in) (XCeed)
- Height: 1,447 mm (57.0 in) (hatchback); 1,442 mm (56.8 in) (Proceed); 1,465 mm (57.7 in) (SW); 1,490 mm (58.7 in) (XCeed)

The third-generation Ceed was announced in February 2018 and revealed ahead of the 2018 Geneva Motor Show. The estate version was announced in March and officially revealed at the 2018 Geneva Motor Show. The production of the hatchback started in May 2018 and the car became available in June. The production of the estate version started in summer 2018.

A 48 volt mild hybrid diesel engine variant of the 1.6 Smartstream, called the 'EcoDynamics+', was added for the entire lineup in 2020.

=== Pre-facelift ===
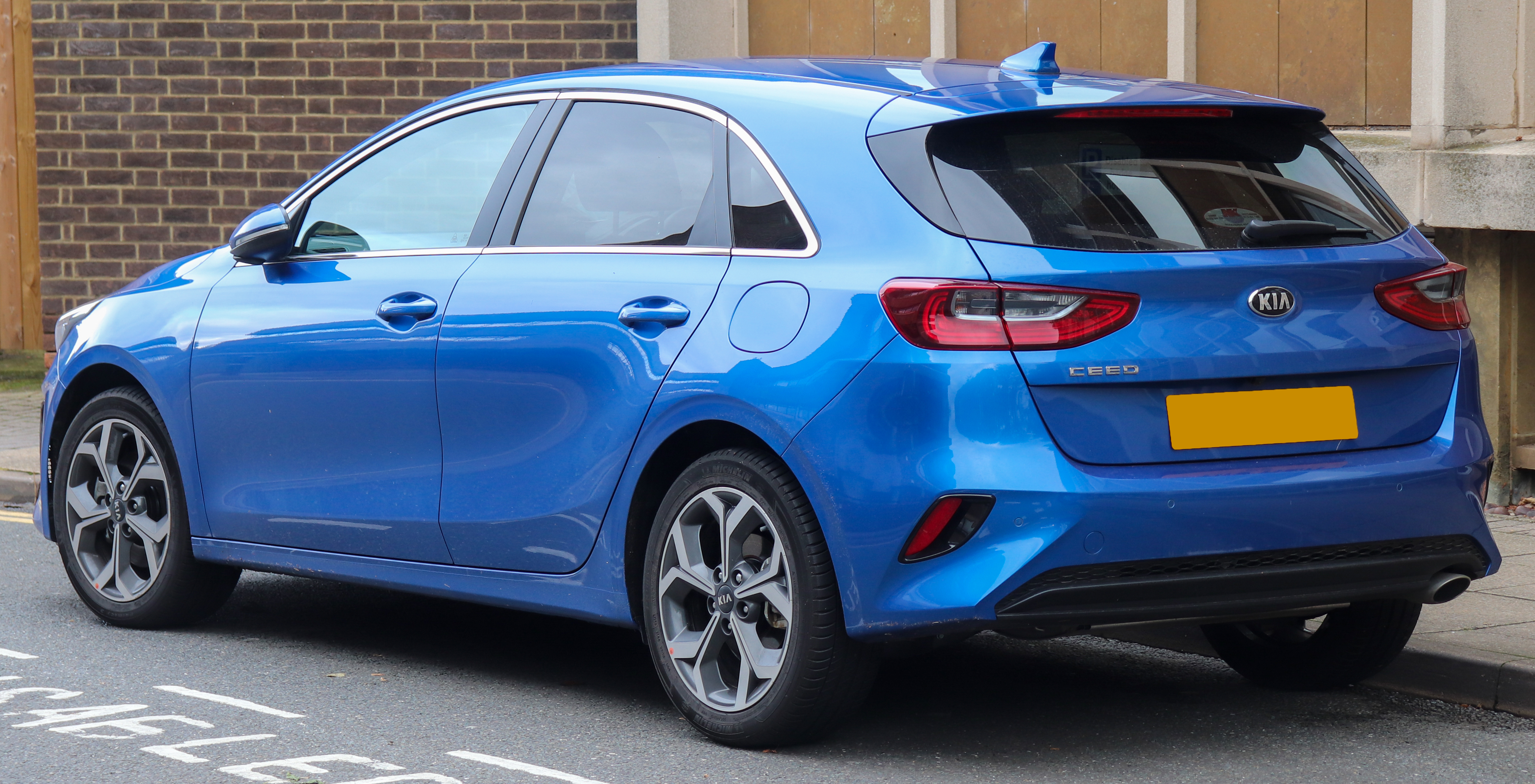
2019 Kia Ceed hatchback

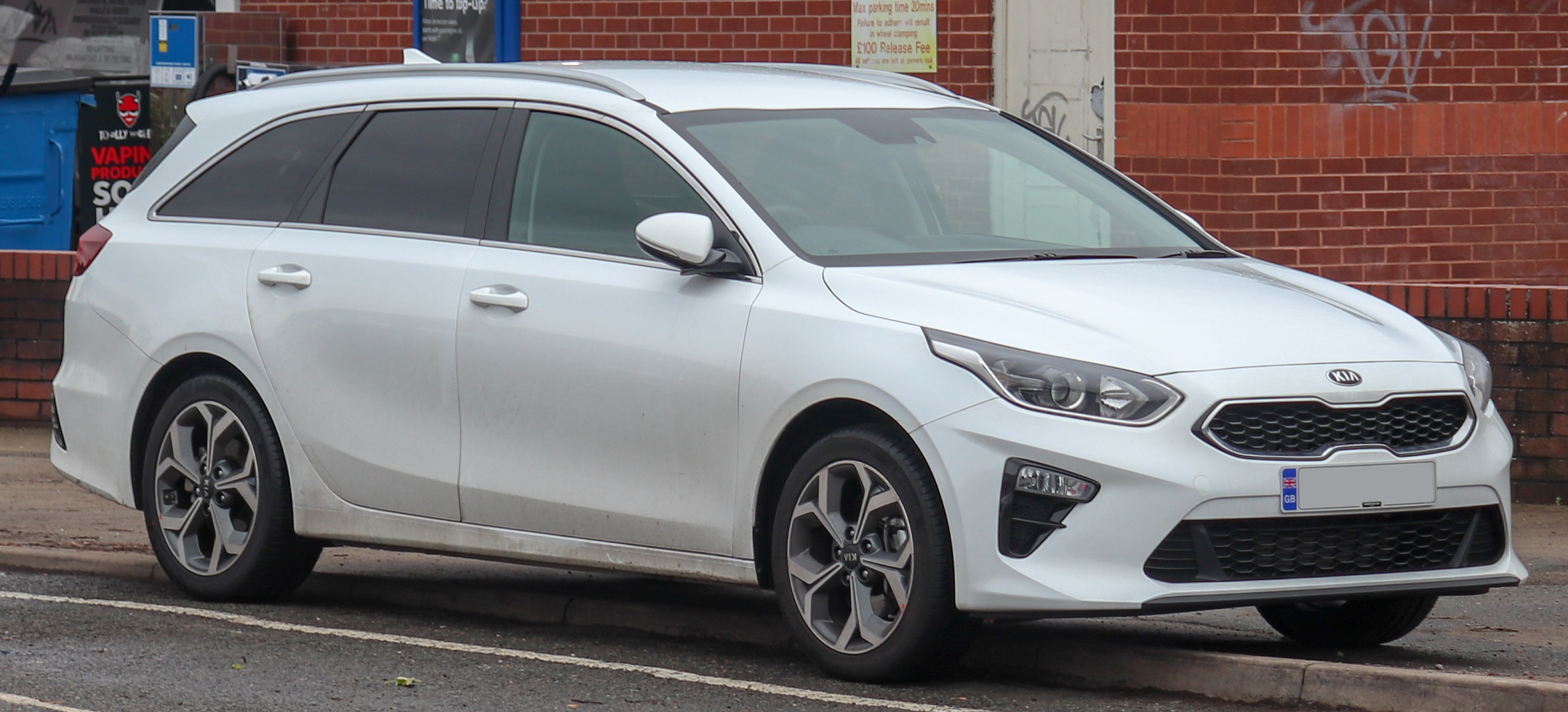
2018 Kia Ceed Sportswagon

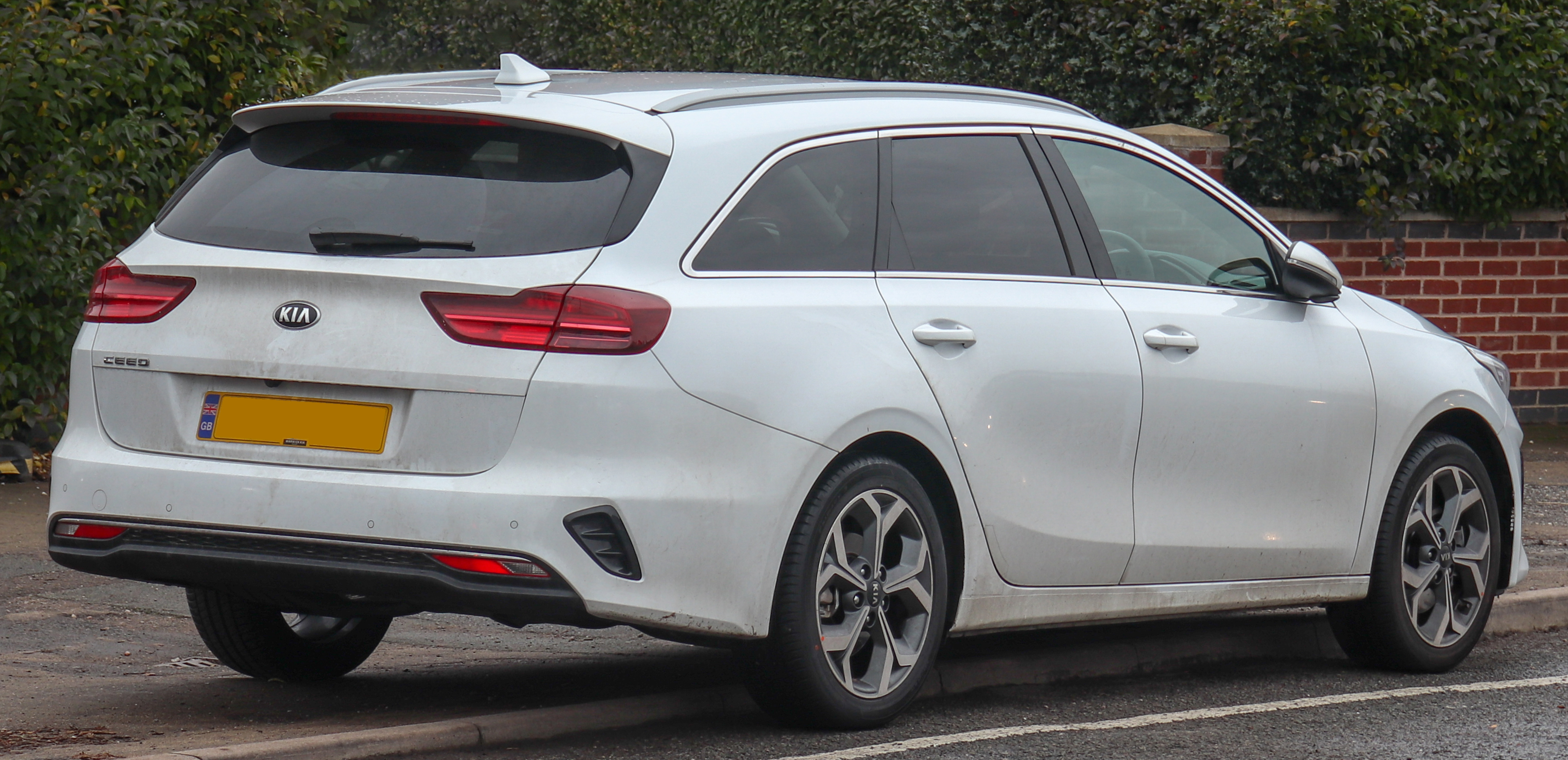
2018 Kia Ceed Sportswagon

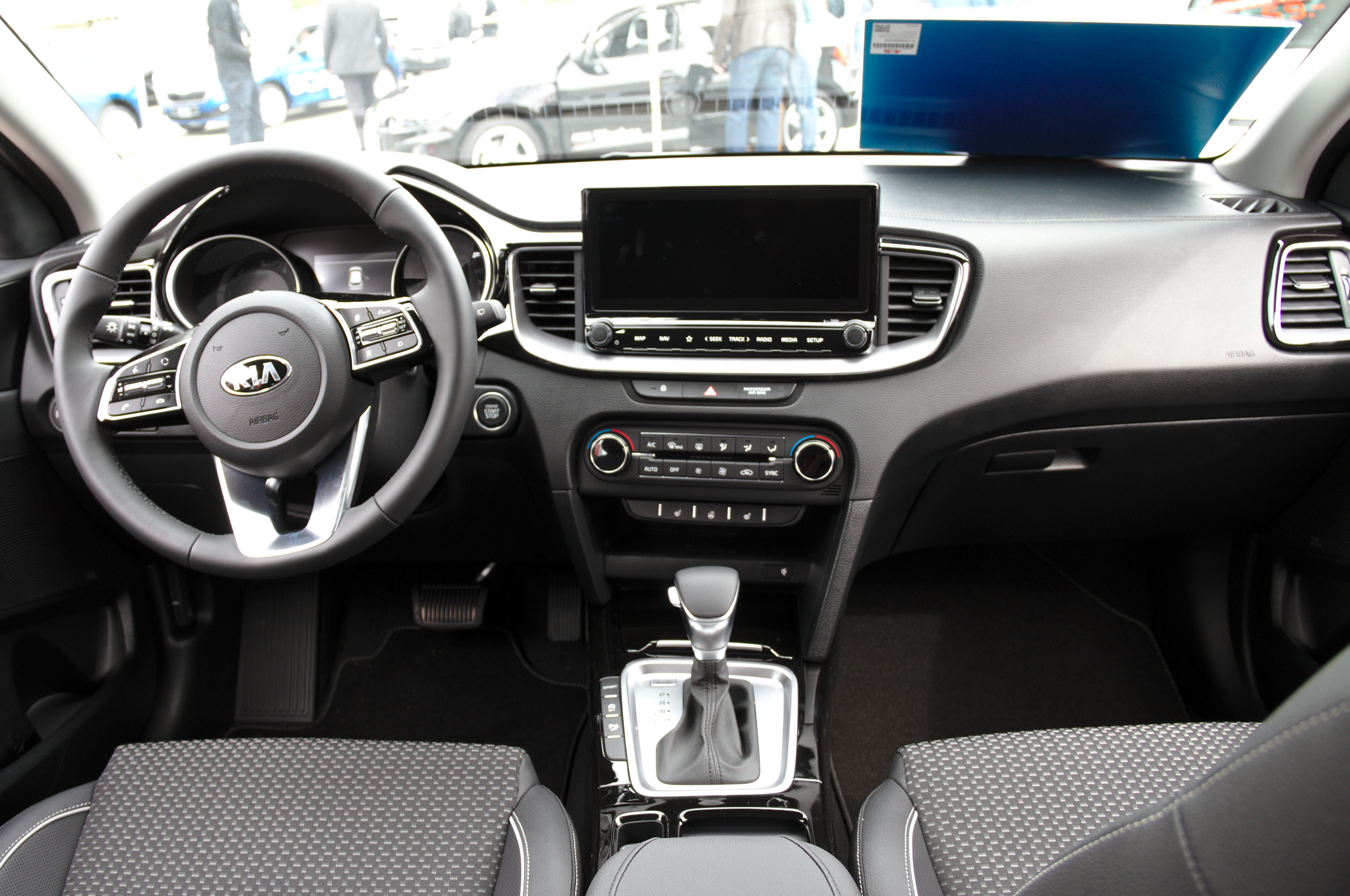
Interior

=== Facelift ===
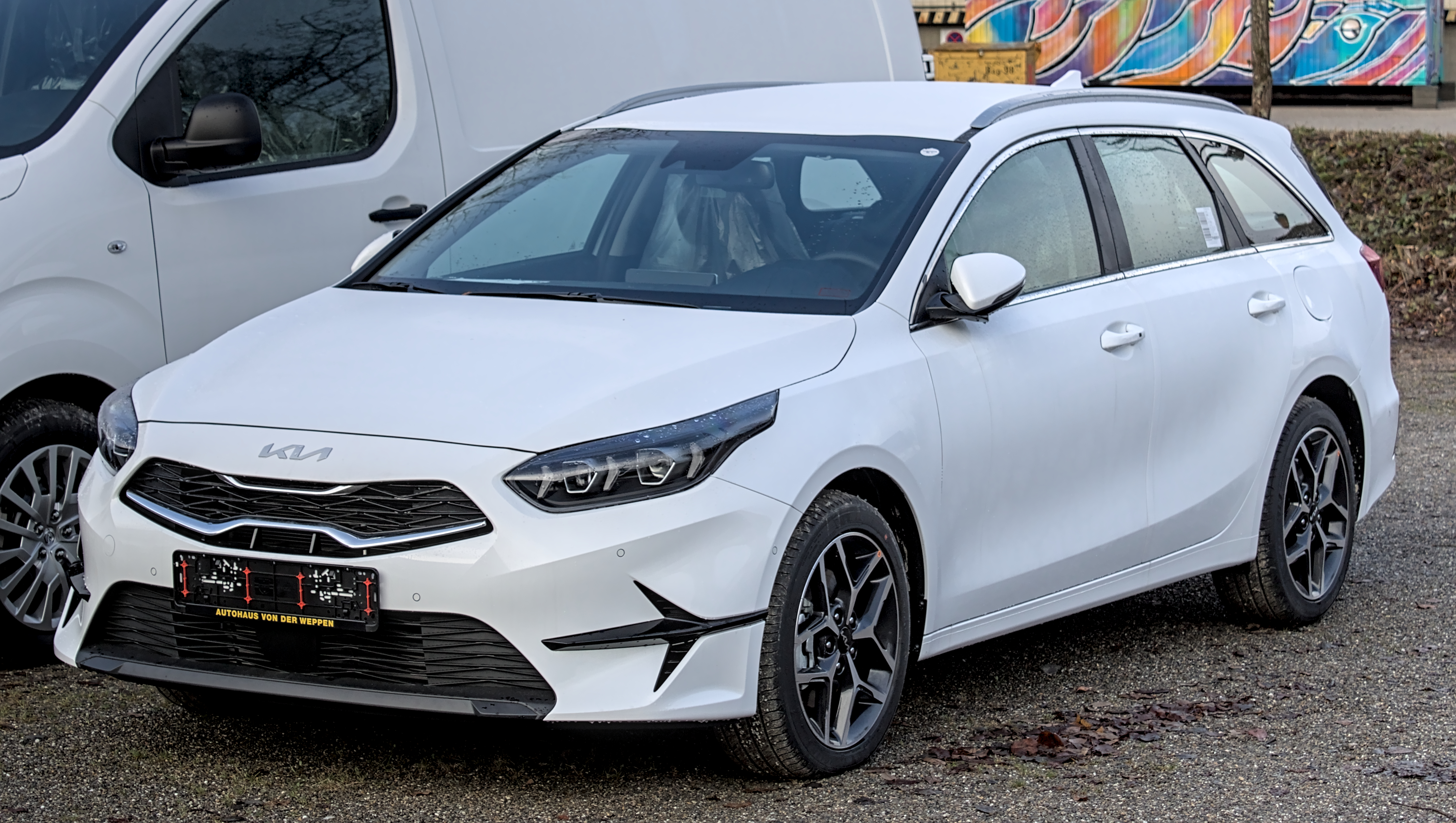
Kia Ceed Sportswagon (facelift)

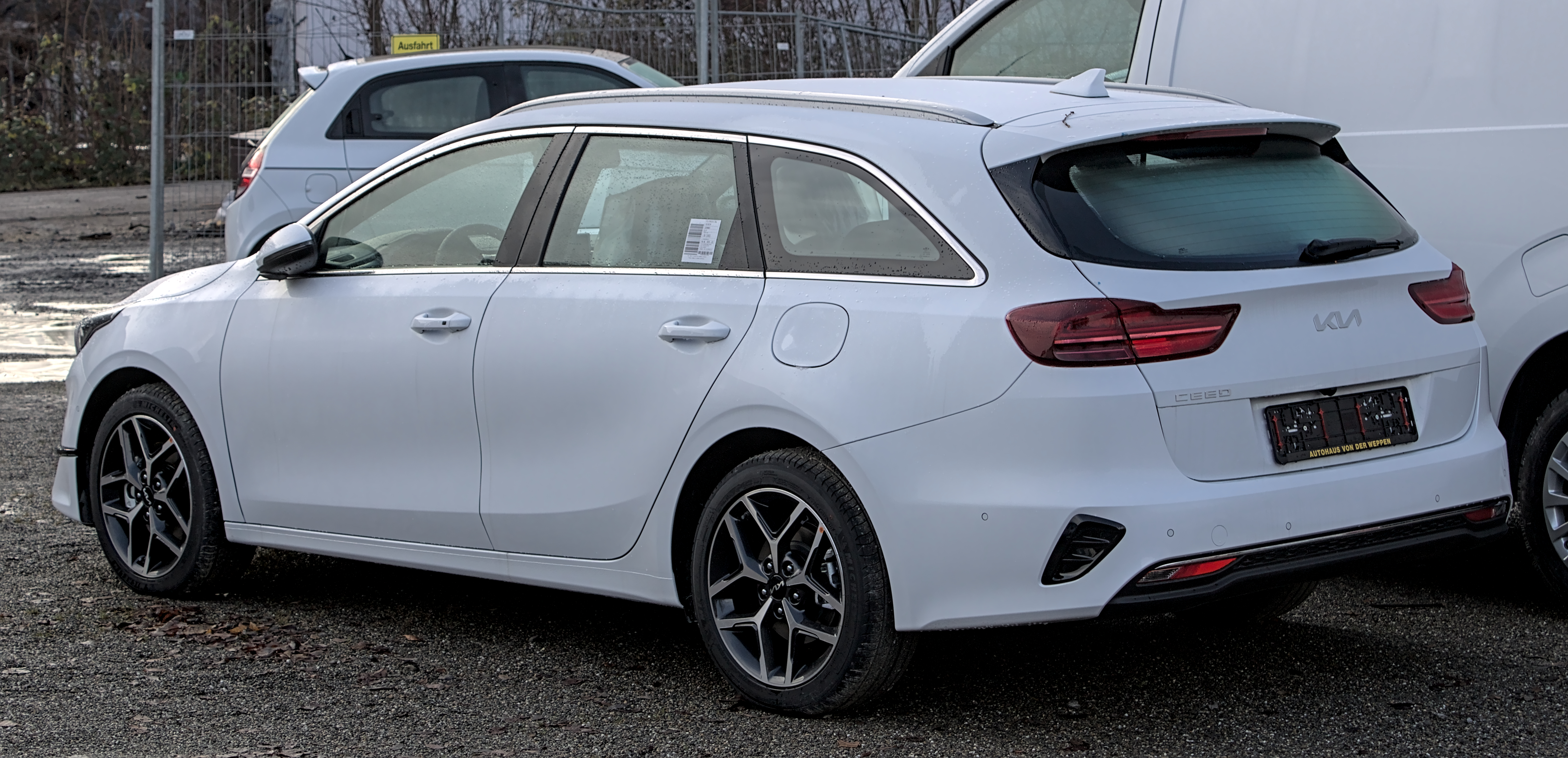
Kia Ceed Sportswagon (facelift)

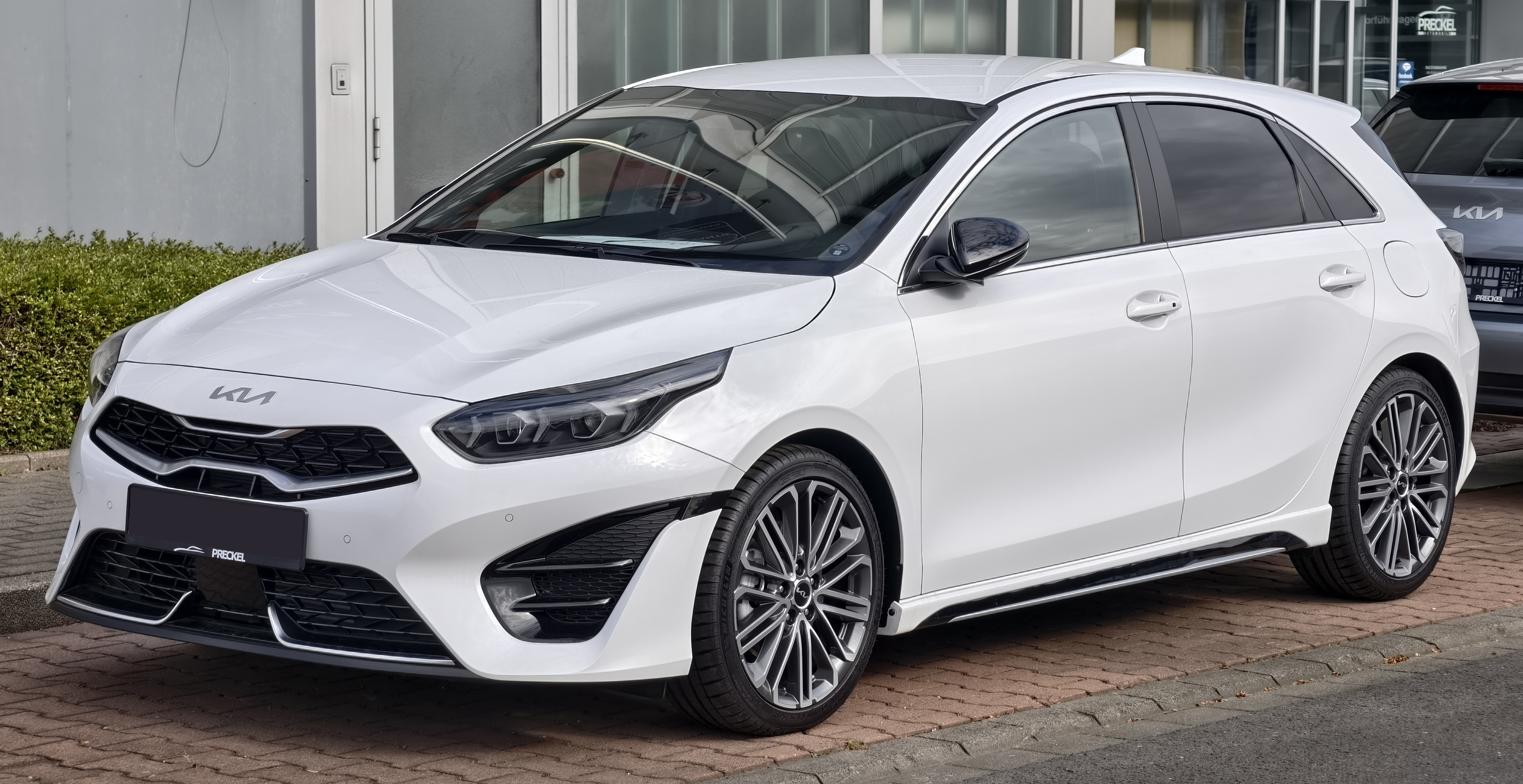
Kia Ceed GT-Line (facelift)

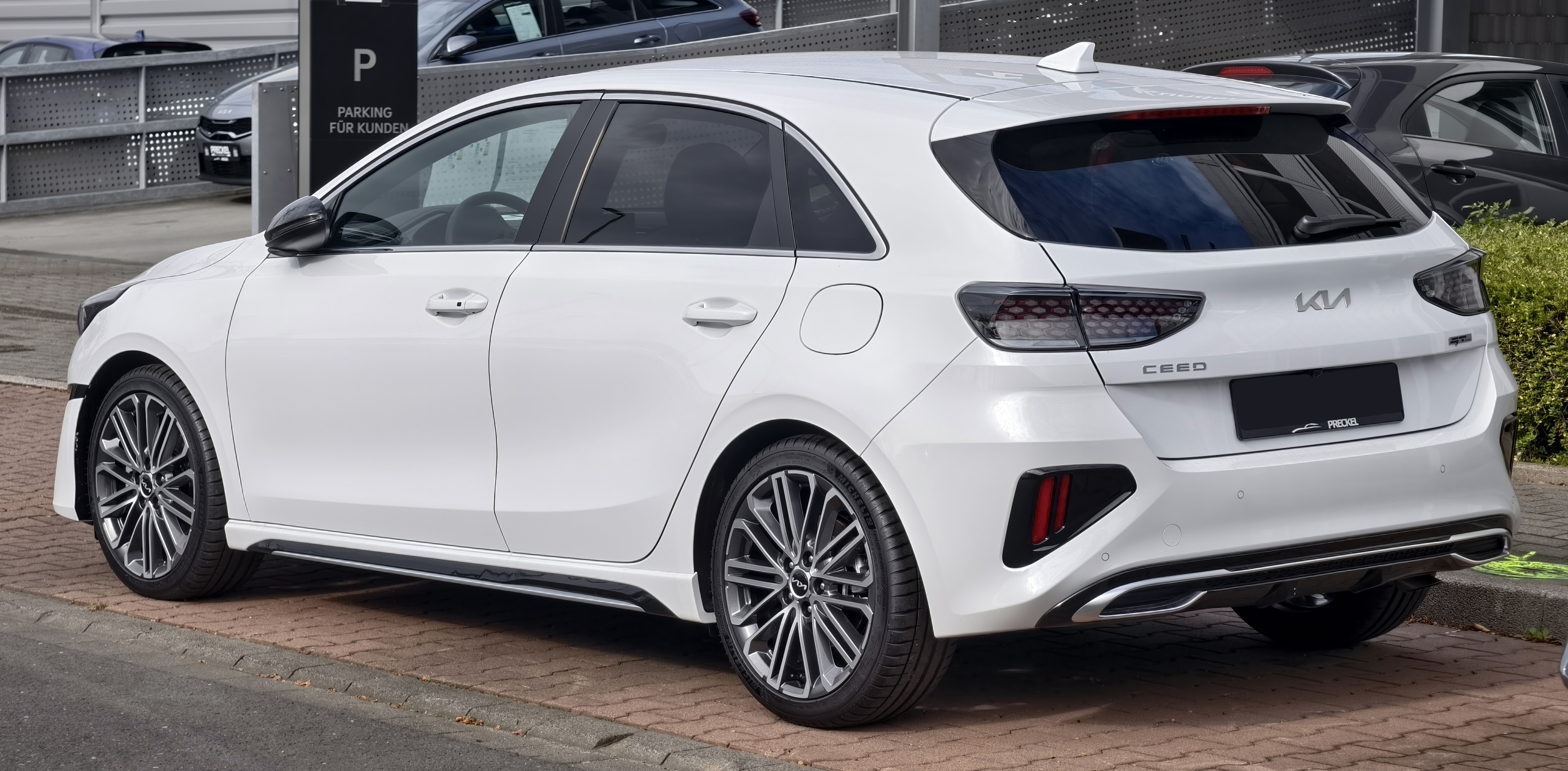
Kia Ceed GT-Line (facelift)

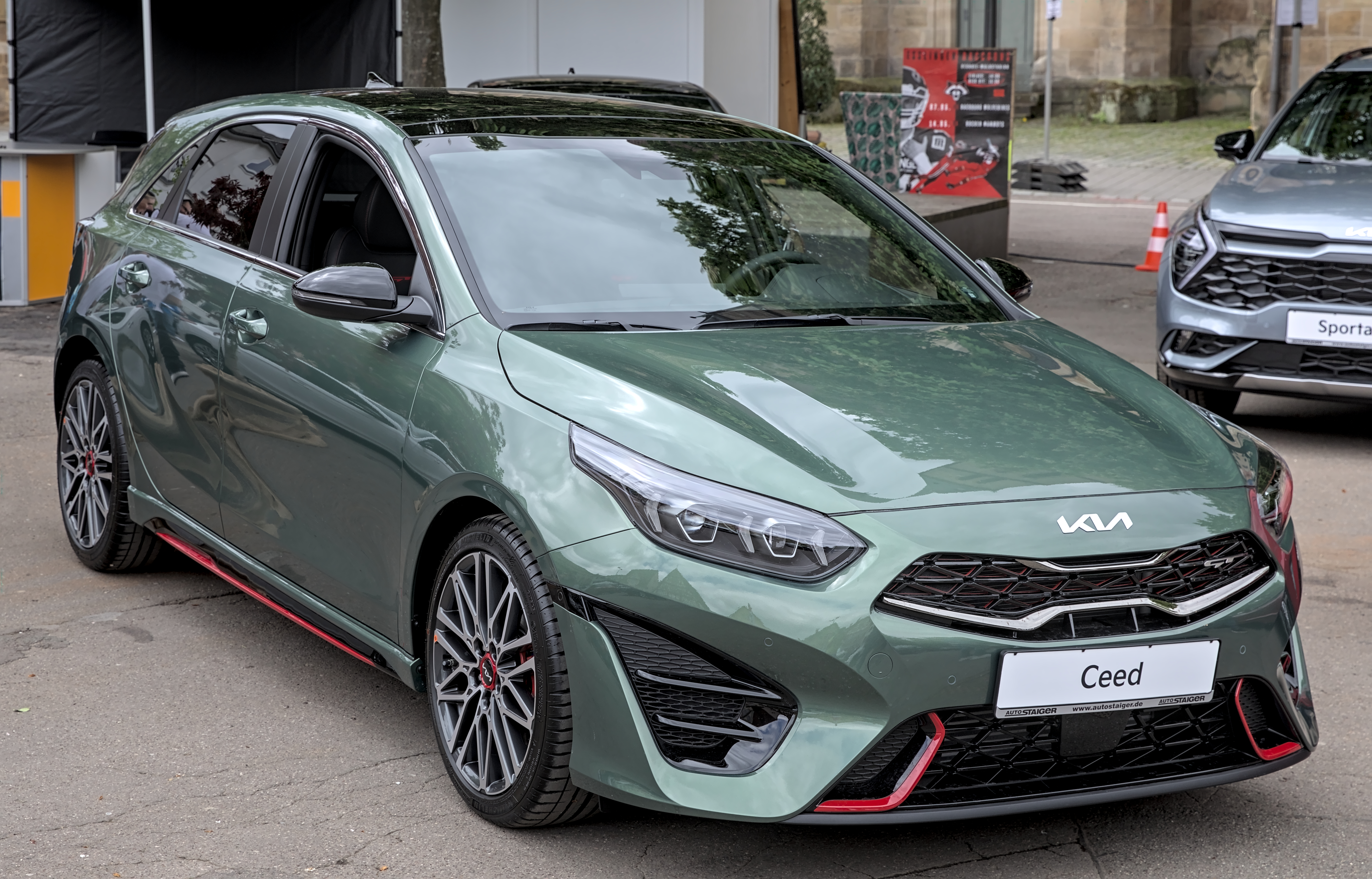
Kia Ceed GT

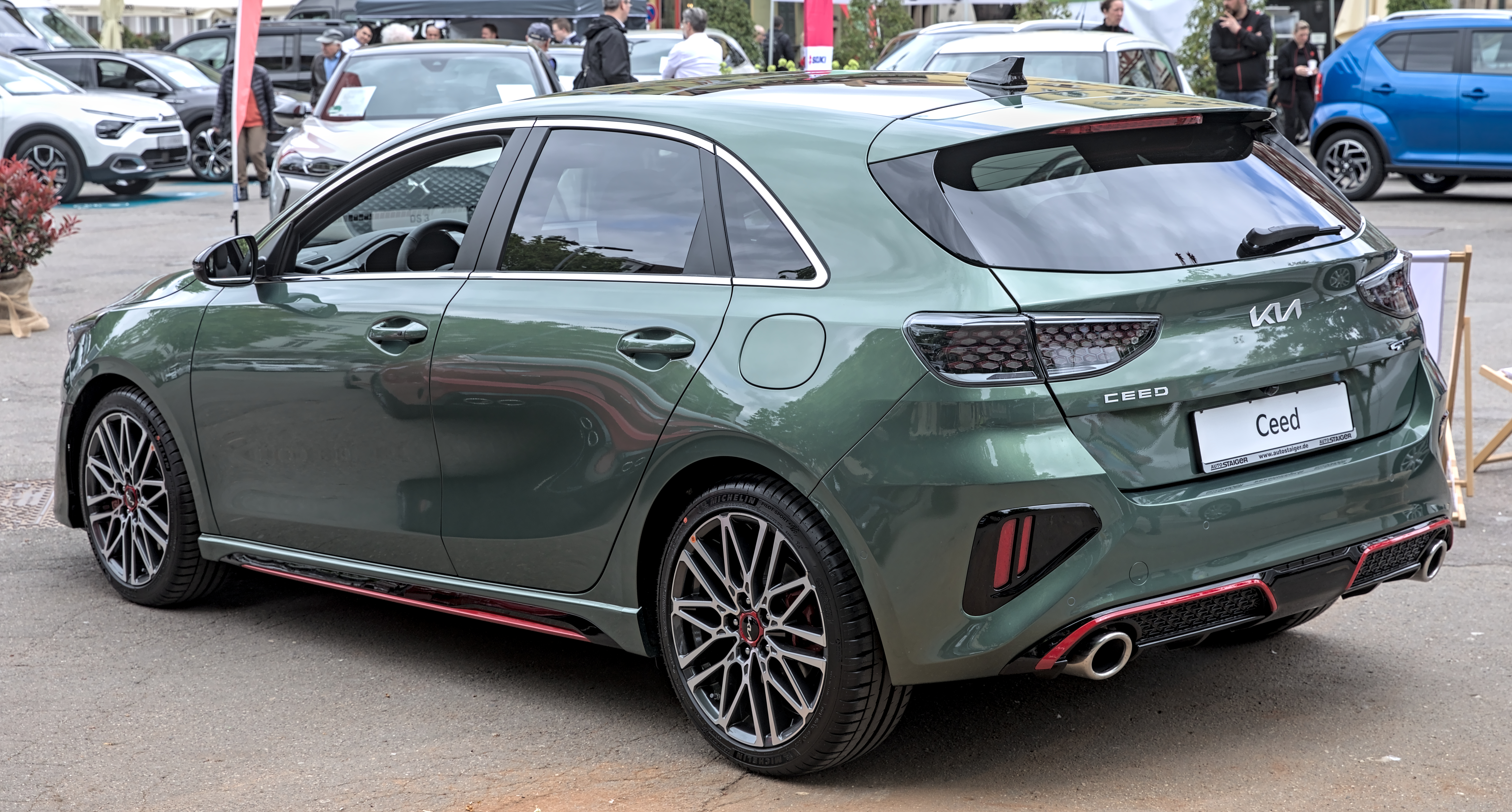
Kia Ceed GT

=== Proceed ===
The Proceed is a shooting brake version of the Ceed launched in early 2019 for the European market. As of 2025, it is gradually being discontinued.

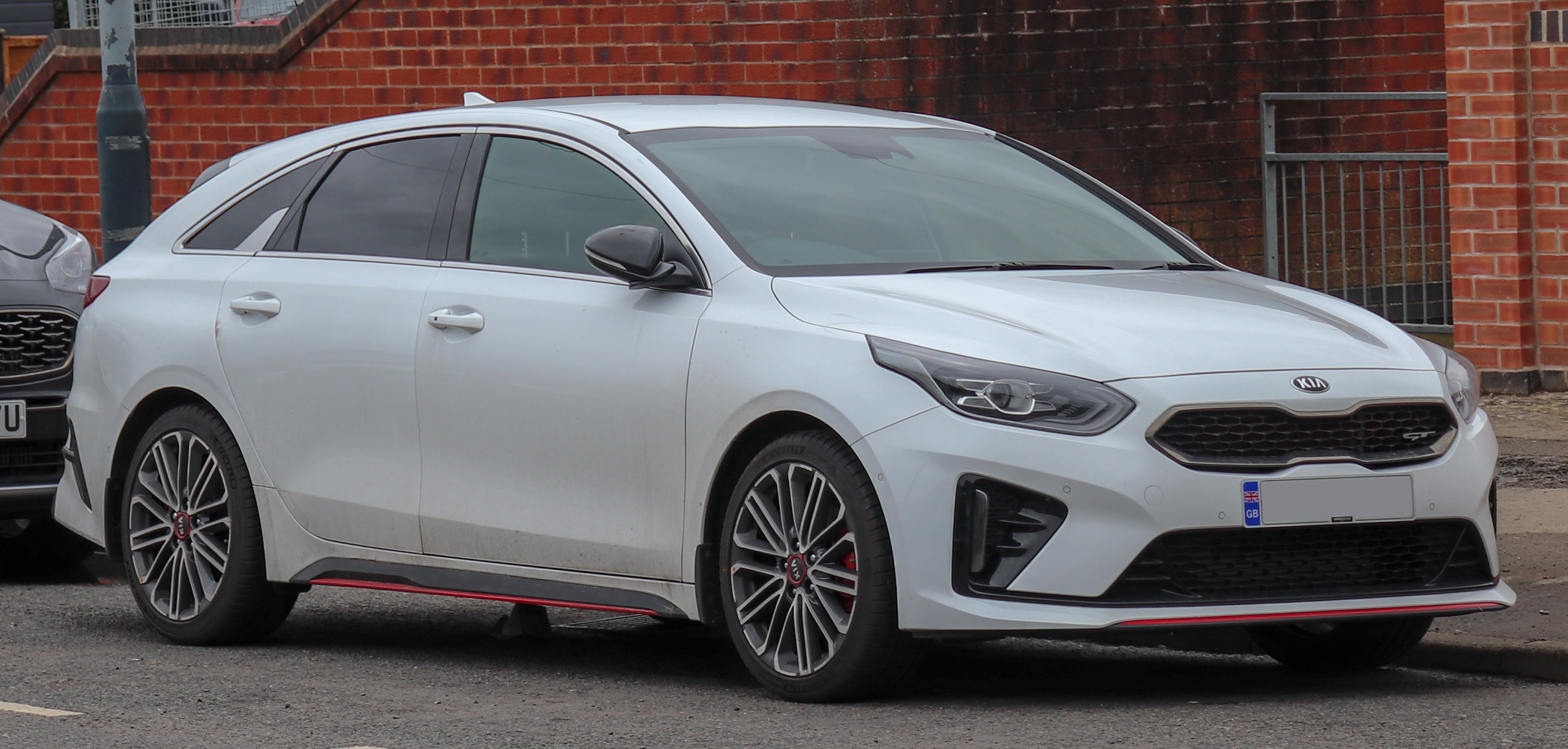
2019 Kia Proceed (pre-facelift)

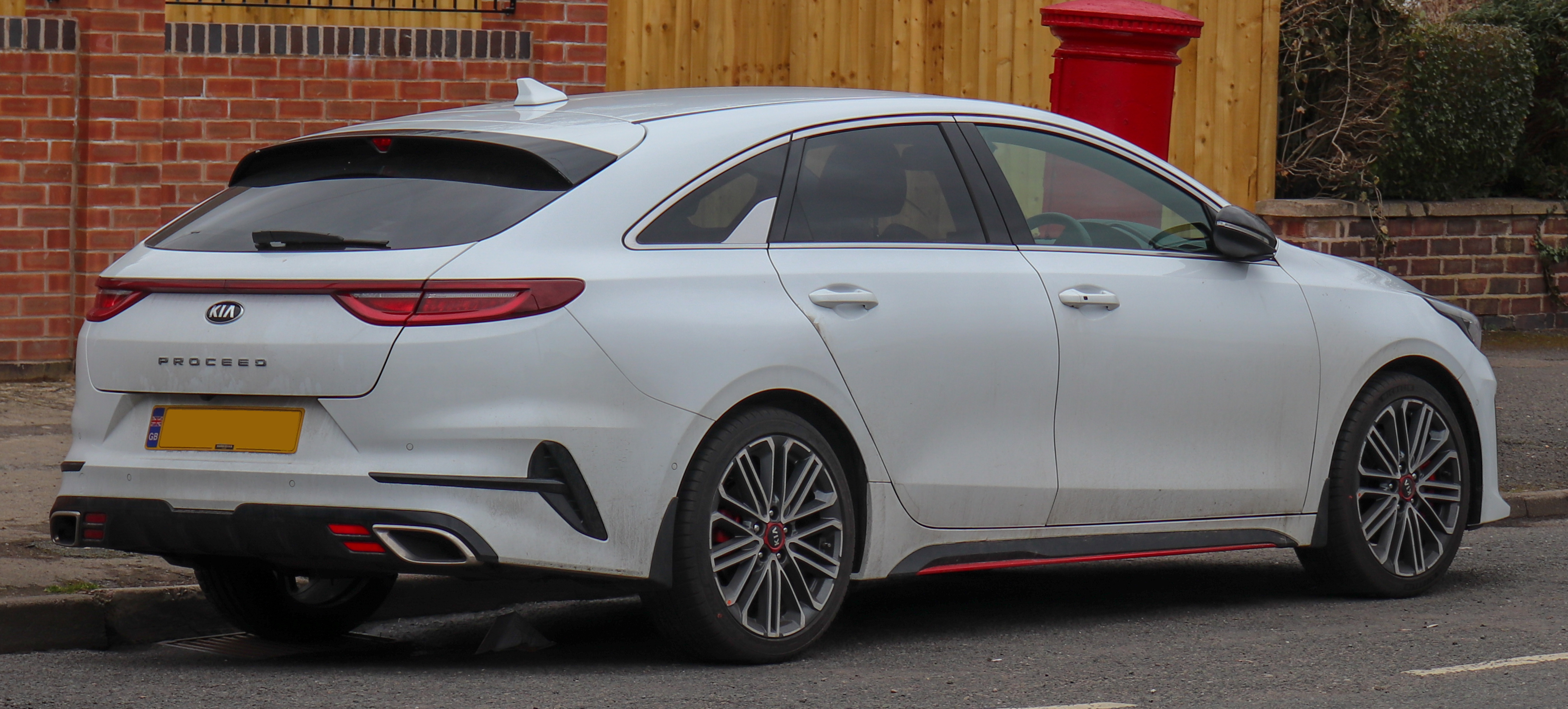
2019 Kia Proceed (pre-facelift)

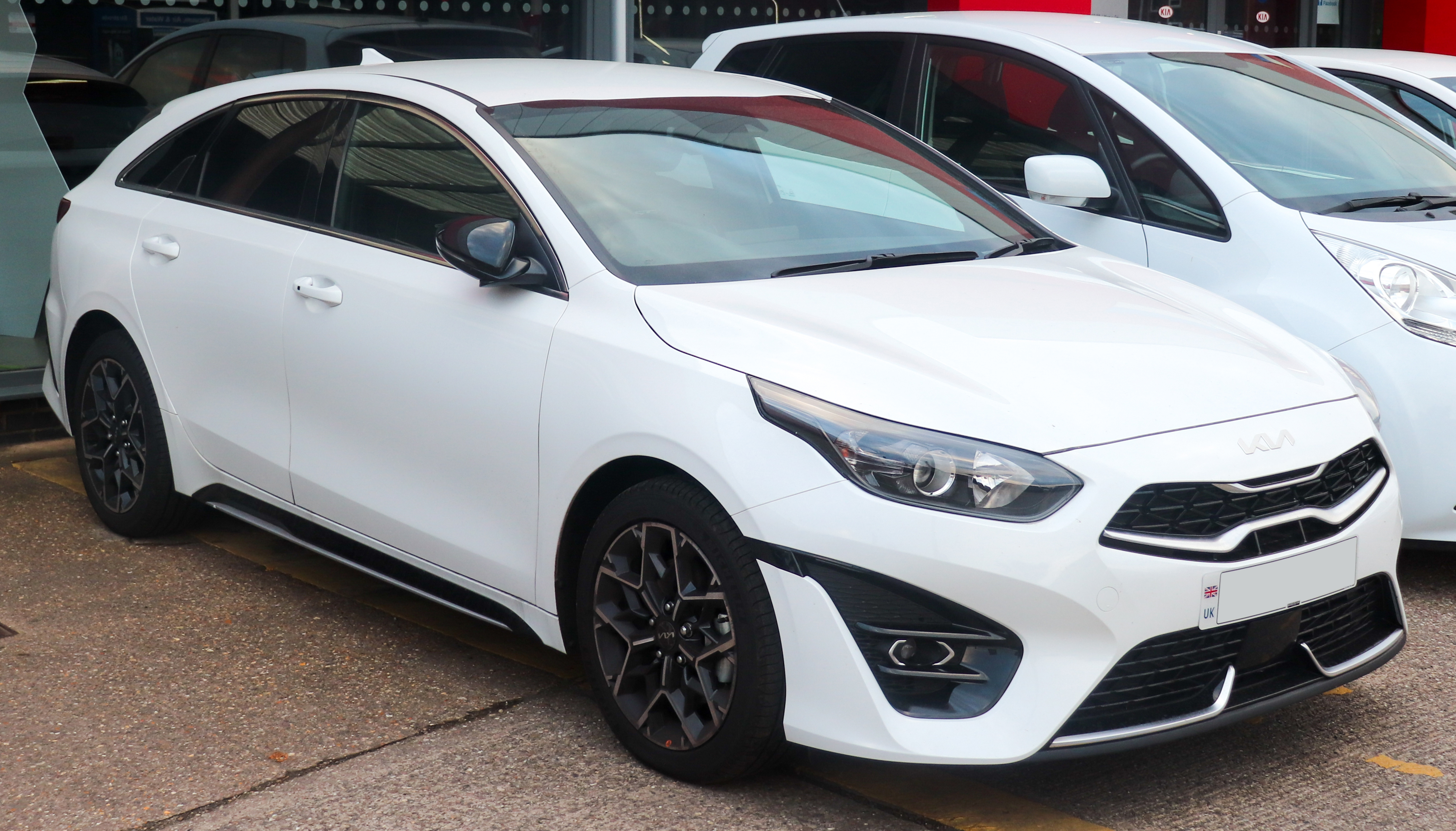
Kia Proceed (facelift)

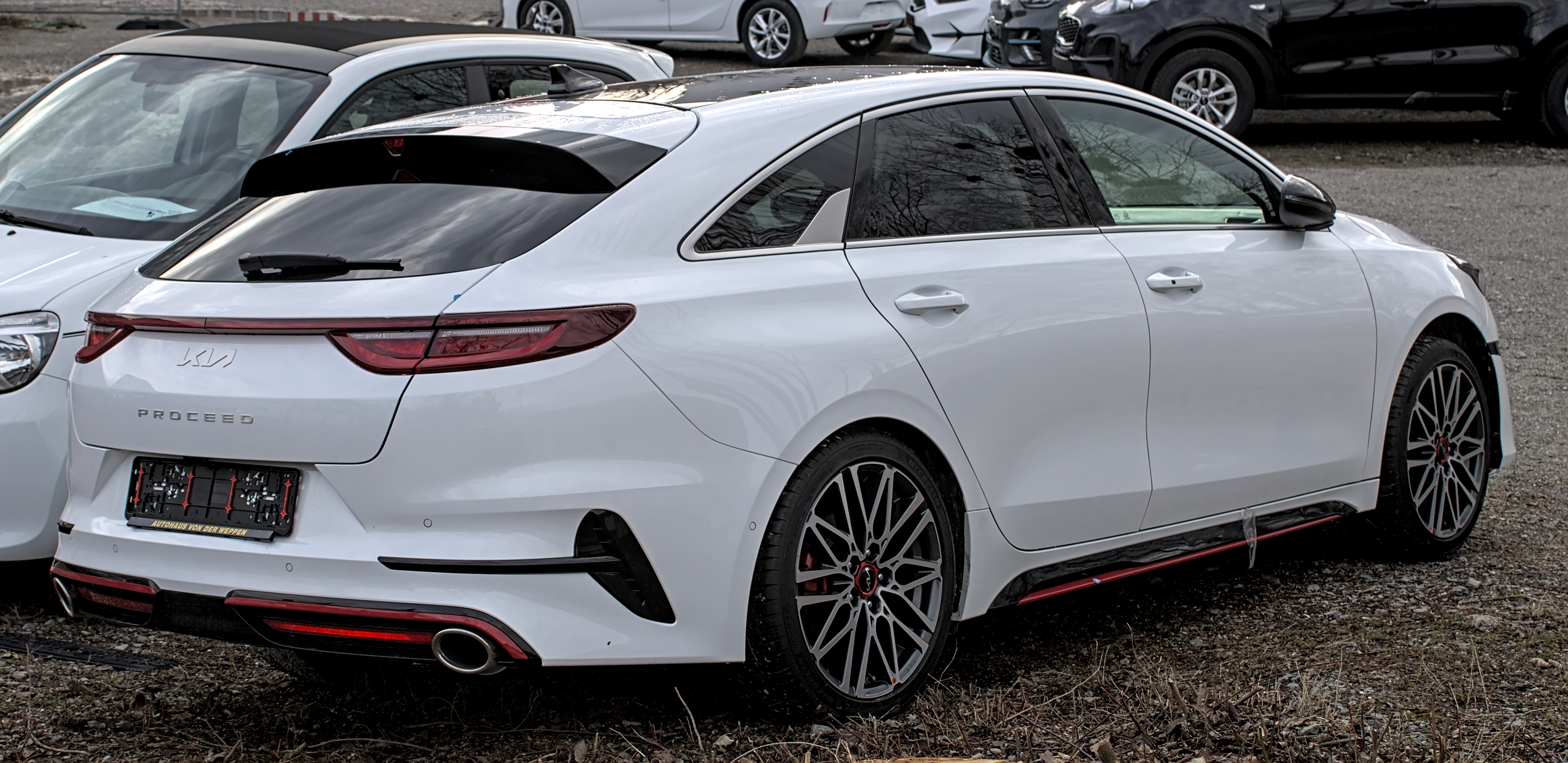
Kia Proceed GT (facelift)

=== XCeed ===
In September 2019, Kia unveiled the XCeed, a crossover SUV based on the third generation Ceed.

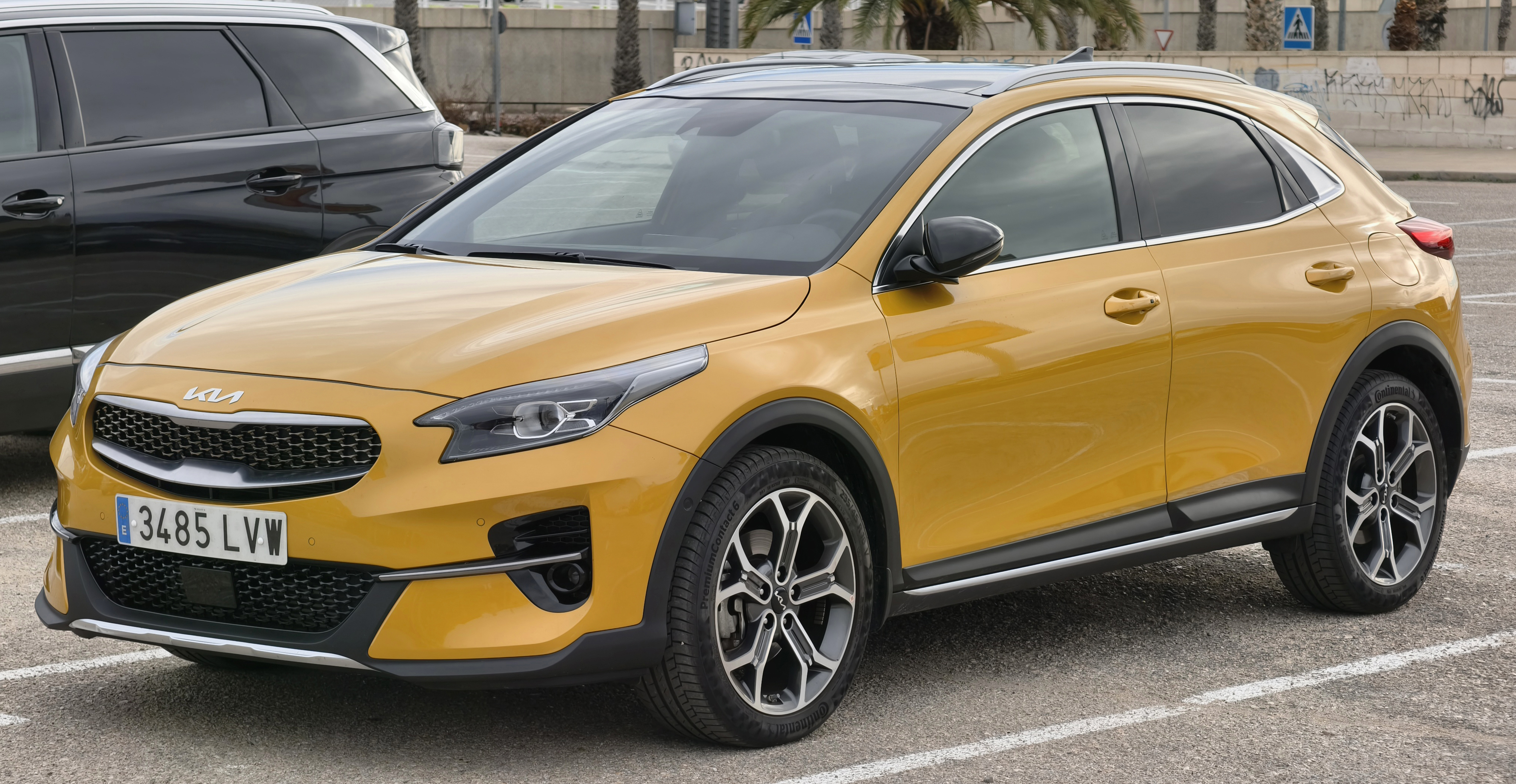
Kia XCeed (pre-facelift)

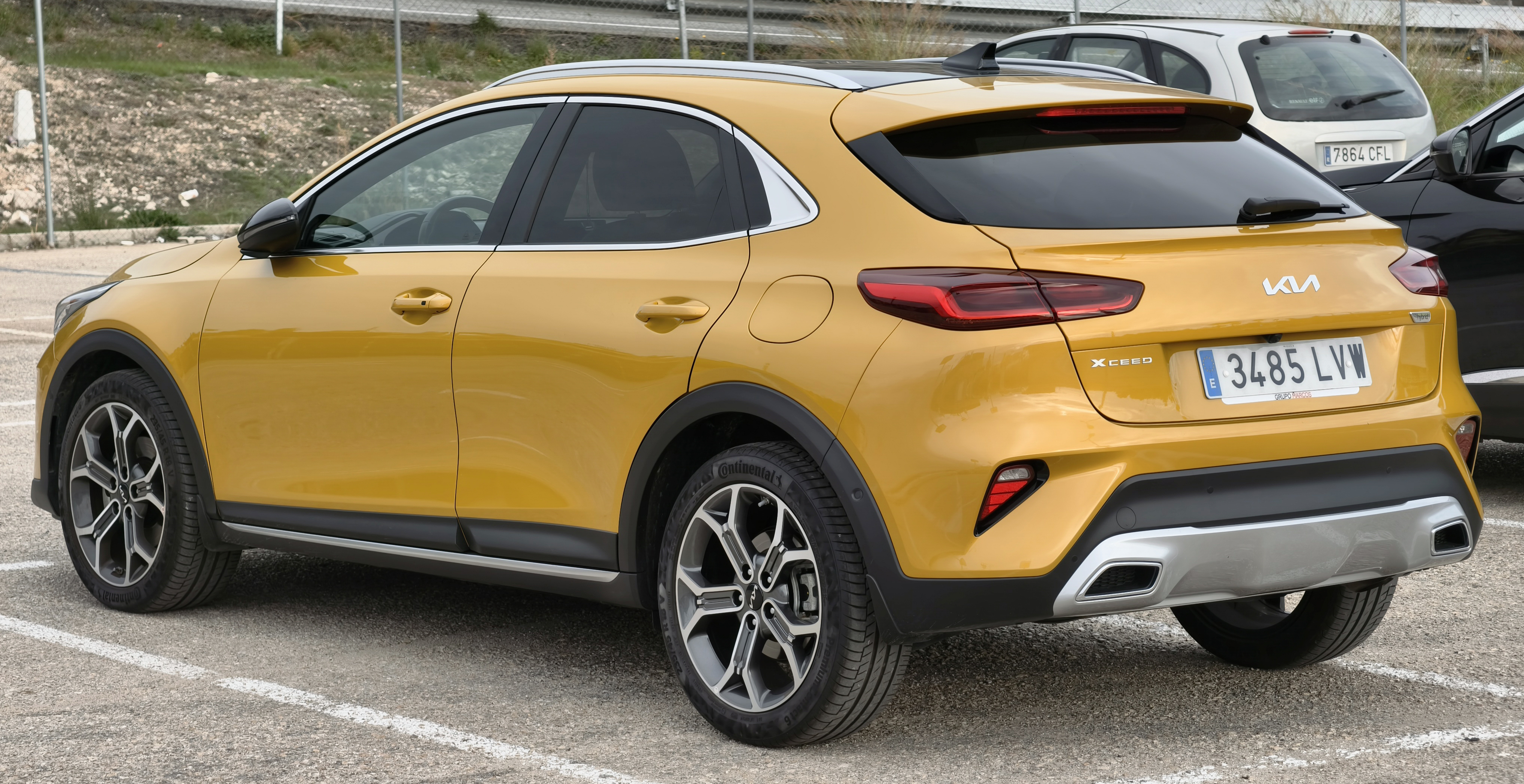
Kia XCeed (pre-facelift)

==== 2023 facelift ====
The XCeed received a mid-cycle facelift, unveiled on 18 July 2022 for the 2023 model year, introducing revised LED headlights, a redesigned grille and front bumper, updated LED taillights, a new rear diffuser, and a new flagship GT-Line trim. It also gained updated interior technology, including wireless Apple CarPlay and Android Auto, USB-C ports, and an available 12.3-inch digital instrument cluster, while retaining 48-volt mild-hybrid and plug-in-hybrid powertrain options.

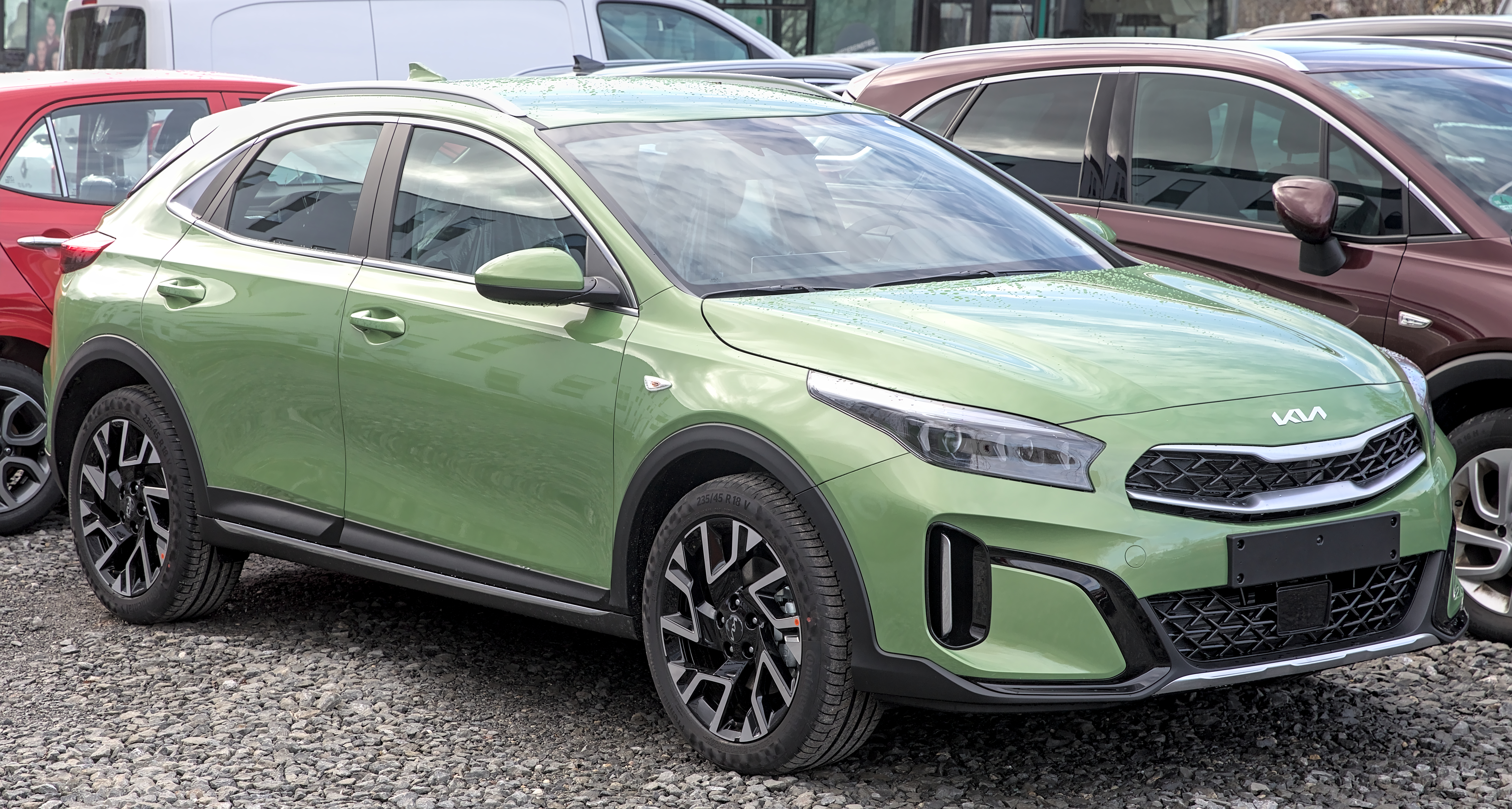
Kia XCeed (first facelift)

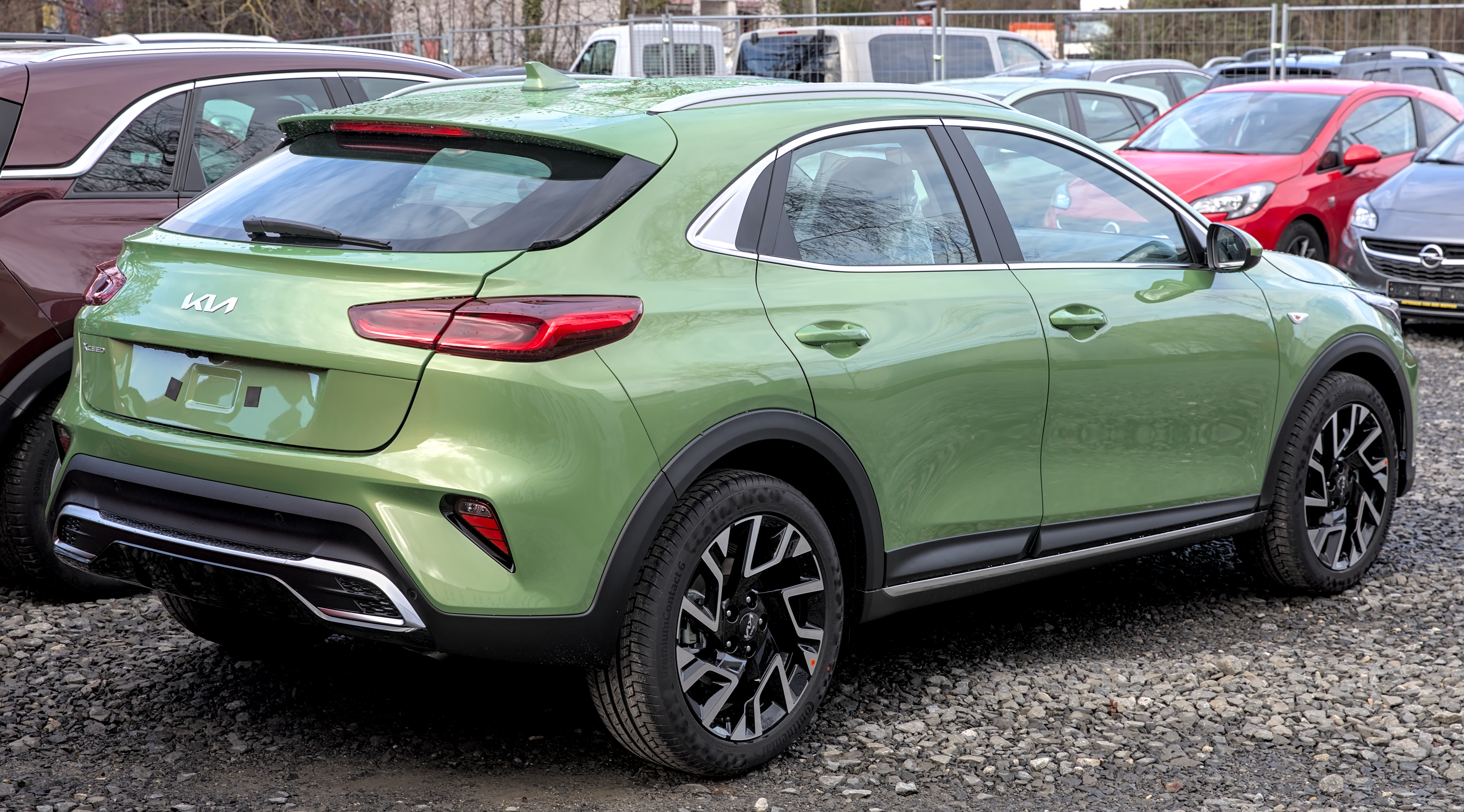
Kia XCeed (first facelift)

==== 2026 facelift ====
The XCeed received a second major facelift, unveiled on 4 May 2026 for the 2026 model year, adopting Kia’s Opposites United design language with vertical LED headlights, a revised front bumper, new alloy wheels, and a rear light bar connecting C-shaped taillights. The cabin gained a dual 12.3-inch panoramic display, updated Kia Connect infotainment, Digital Key 2.0, and revised suspension and steering tuning; production began at Kia’s Žilina plant in Slovakia on 29 May 2026.

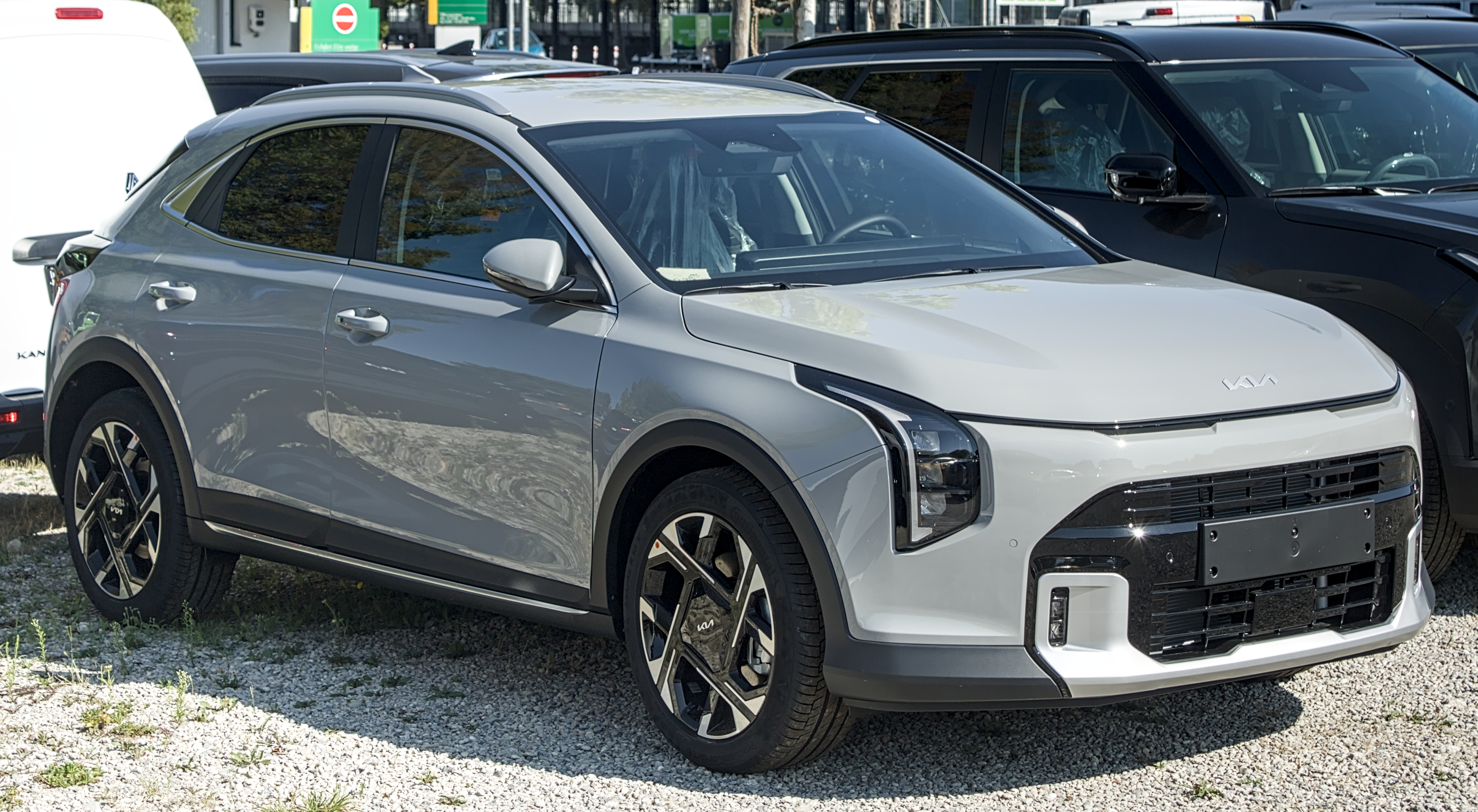
Kia XCeed (second facelift)

Kia XCeed (second facelift)

=== Engines ===
Petrol engines
Model	Engine	Power	Torque	Transmissions
1.0 Kappa II T-GDi	998 cc (60.9 cu in) turbocharged I3	120 PS (88 kW; 118 hp) at 6,300 rpm	172 N⋅m (18 kg⋅m; 127 lb⋅ft) at 1,500 rpm–4,000 rpm	6-speed manual
1.0 Smartstream G1.0 T-GDi	998 cc (60.9 cu in) turbocharged I3	120 PS (88 kW; 118 hp) at 6,300 rpm	172 N⋅m (18 kg⋅m; 127 lb⋅ft) at 1,500 rpm–4,000 rpm	6-speed manual
1.4 Kappa II T-GDI	1,353 cc (82.6 cu in) turbocharged I4	140 PS (103 kW; 138 hp) at 6,000 rpm	242 N⋅m (25 kg⋅m; 178 lb⋅ft) at 1,500–3,200 rpm	6-speed manual 7-speed DCT
1.5 Smartstream G1.5 T-GDI	1,482 cc (90.4 cu in) turbocharged I4	160 PS (118 kW; 158 hp) at 5,500 rpm	253 N⋅m (26 kg⋅m; 187 lb⋅ft) at 1,500–3,500 rpm	6-speed manual 7-speed DCT
1.6 Gamma II MPi	1,591 cc (97.1 cu in) I4	130 PS (96 kW; 128 hp) at 6000 rpm	157 N⋅m (16 kg⋅m; 116 lb⋅ft) at 4,500–4,850 rpm	6-speed manual 6-speed automatic
1.6 Gamma II T-GDI	1,591 cc (97.1 cu in) turbocharged I4	204 PS (150 kW; 201 hp) at 5,500 rpm	265 N⋅m (27 kg⋅m; 195 lb⋅ft) at 1,500–4,500 rpm	7-speed DCT
Diesel engines
Model	Engine	Power	Torque	Transmissions
1.6 L Smartstream D1.6 CRDi VGT	1,598 cc (97.5 cu in) turbocharged I4	116 PS (85 kW; 114 hp) at 4,000 rpm	280 N⋅m (29 kg⋅m; 207 lb⋅ft) at 1,500–2,750 rpm	6-speed manual 7-speed DCT
1.6 L Smartstream D1.6 CRDi VGT	1,598 cc (97.5 cu in) turbocharged I4	116 PS (85 kW; 114 hp) at 4,000 rpm	300 N⋅m (31 kg⋅m; 221 lb⋅ft) at 1,500–2,750 rpm	6-speed manual 7-speed DCT
1.6 L Smartstream D1.6 CRDi VGT	1,598 cc (97.5 cu in) turbocharged I4	136 PS (100 kW; 134 hp) at 4,000 rpm	280 N⋅m (29 kg⋅m; 207 lb⋅ft) at 1,500–3,000 rpm	6-speed manual 7-speed DCT
1.6 L Smartstream D1.6 CRDi VGT	1,598 cc (97.5 cu in) turbocharged I4	136 PS (100 kW; 134 hp) at 4,000 rpm	320 N⋅m (33 kg⋅m; 236 lb⋅ft) at 2,000–2,250 rpm	6-speed manual 7-speed DCT

=== Safety ===
Euro NCAP test results* Kia Ceed 1.4 T-GDi 'EX' (LHD) (2019)
Test	Points	%
Overall:	4 /5 stars	
Adult occupant:	33.8	88%
Child occupant:	41.9	85%
Pedestrian:	25.2	52%
Safety assist:	8.9	68%

== Sales ==
The Cee'd became Kia's best selling European model from 2007 to 2011, then it was overtaken by the Sportage, strongly outperforming sales of its predecessor, the Cerato and the previous best selling model, the Picanto — with sales of between 90,000 and 150,000 units per year. In 2008, the cee'd represented 44% of Kia's total sales volumes in Europe. Sales benefited from the innovative seven years' warranty—the first such warranty ever to be offered on any vehicle marketed in Europe.

Year	Europe (Note: Includes EU countries, Iceland, Liechtenstein, Norway and Switzerland)	
Year	Ceed	XCeed
2007	71,952	
2008	112,373	
2009	90,233	
2010	87,616	
2011	69,813	
2012	79,471 (Note: Sales figures include both the ED and JD models.)	
2013	82,794 (Note: Sales figures include both the ED and JD models.)	
2014	75,960	
2015	76,075	
2016	77,787	
2017	72,105	
2018	75,479	
2019	100,187	10,599
2020	70,879	43,880
2021	84,103	50,805
2022	82,775	53,074
2023	86,177	43,531
2024	91,019	38,348

== Concepts ==
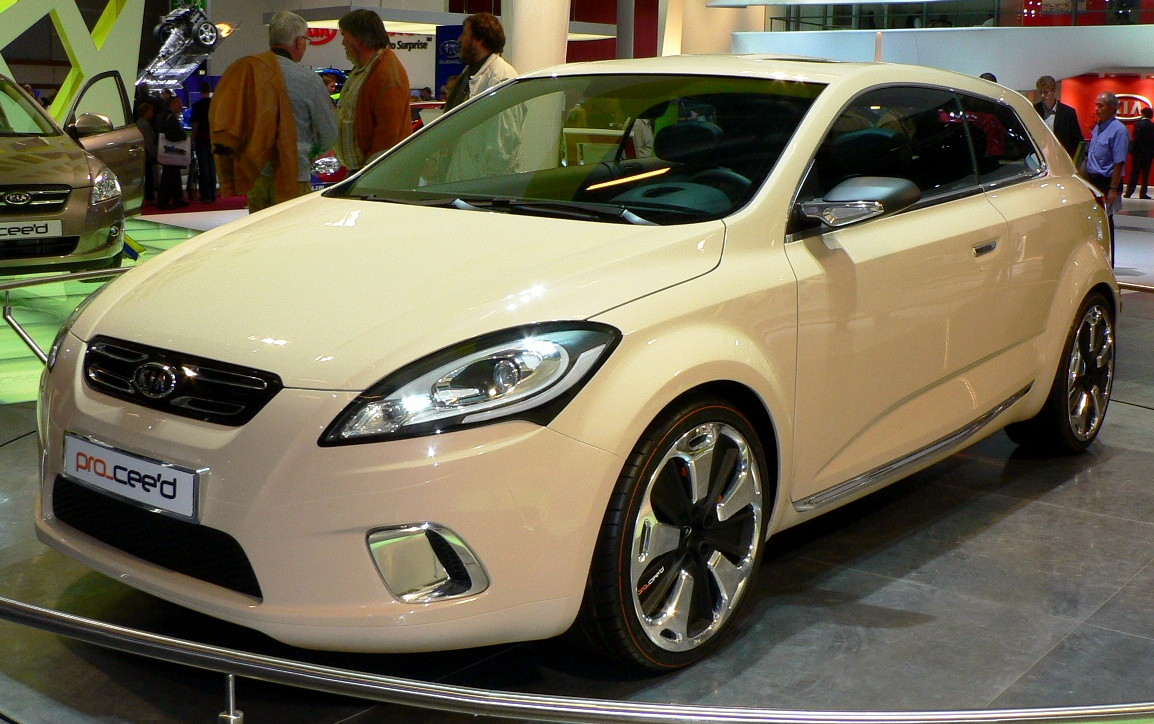
Kia Pro_cee'd Concept

Kia Pro_cee'd

At the 2007 Frankfurt Motor Show, Kia unveiled the Pro_Cee'd, The Show Car designed by Pontus Fontaeus, and began marketing the model in January 2008. The Pro_Cee'd is mechanically identical to the 5-door model but many body panels (sans the bonnet and front-wings) are new and do not carry over from the 5-door model. The first-generation Pro_Cee'd was often compared to the Audi A3 in terms of its appearance, Auto Express calling it a "bargain Audi A3".

In 2013, Kia released the second-generation Pro_Cee'd. Unlike the previous generation, this car shares no body panels with the 5-door model. The new Pro_Cee'd has been continually praised in reviews for its looks, with a more coupé-like appearance, more sporting stance, lower suspension (by 40 mm) and a smaller front grille. The car has, however, gained some criticism; it excels at comfort and refinement like the standard Cee'd, but its suspension and steering are not considered at all sporty, its setup favouring the aforementioned comfort.

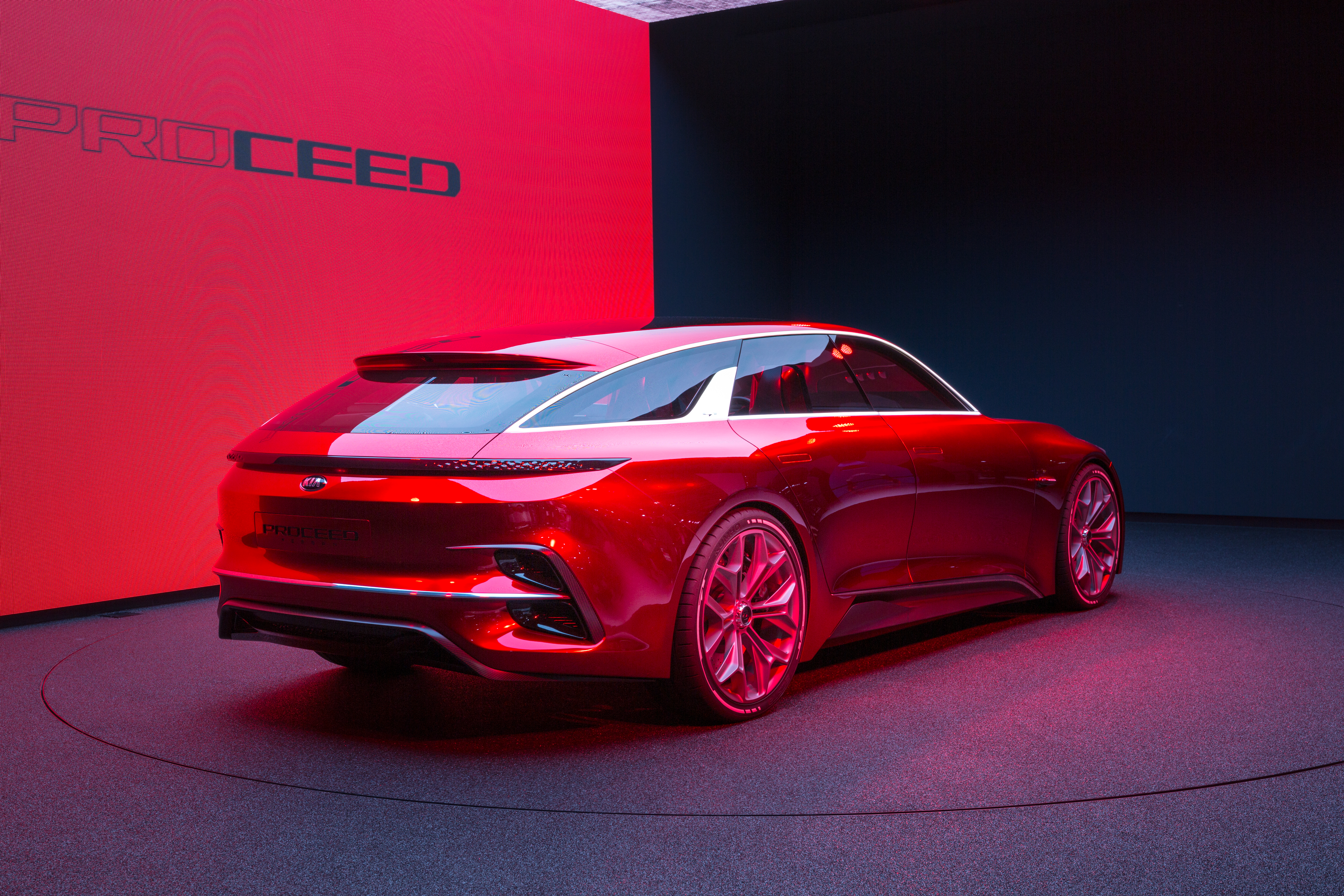
Kia ProCeed Concept 2017

In 2017, Kia released a concept for the third-generation ProCeed. This time as a shooting brake version of the Ceed.

Kia Ex_cee'd

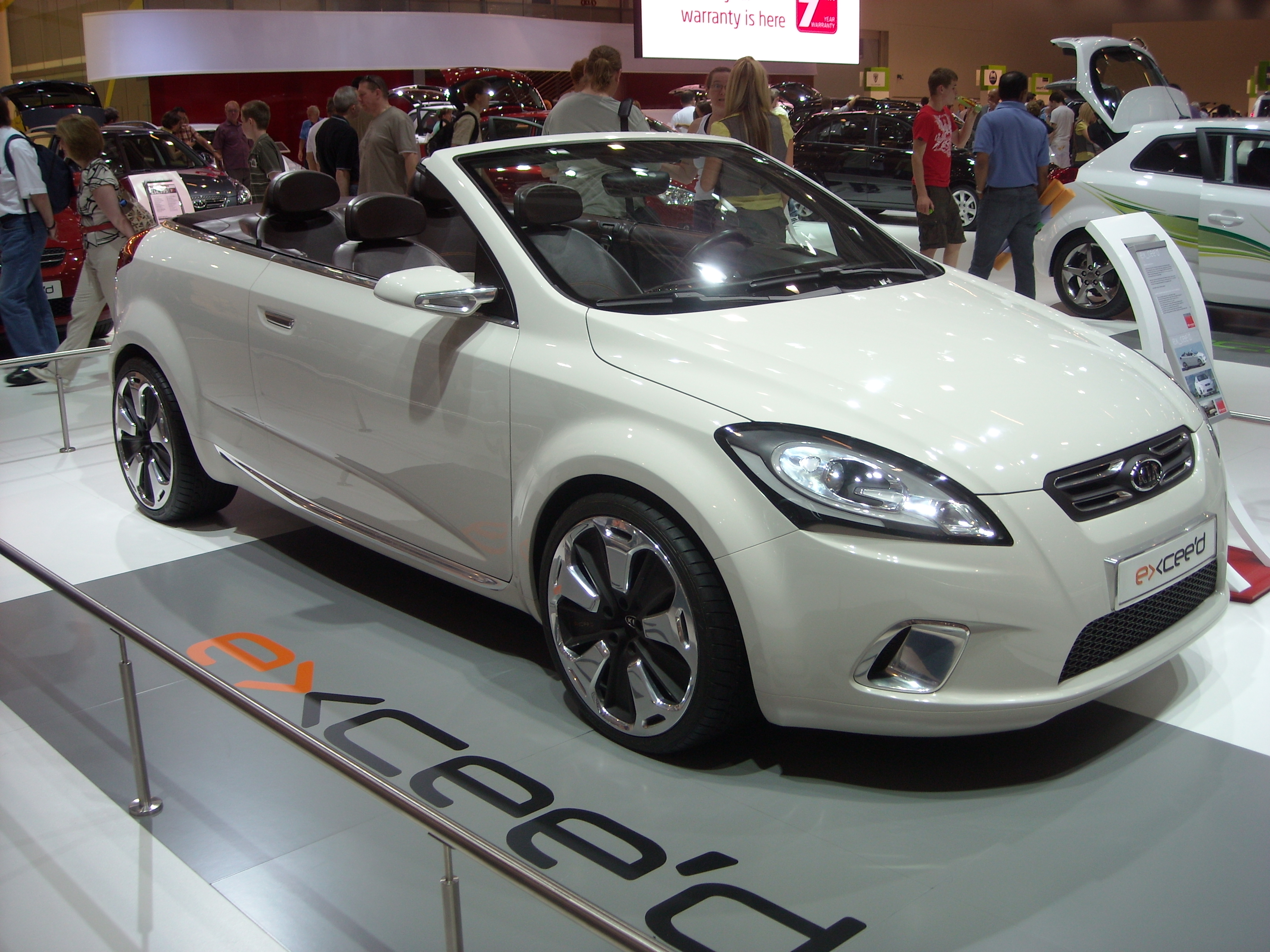
Kia Ex_cee'd Concept

Kia's Ex_cee'd cabriolet concept car premiered at the 77th Geneva International Motor Show in 2007 and was designed by Pontus Fontaeus. Based on the three-door Cee'd hatchback (Pro_cee'd), the Ex_cee'd shares the same platform, but features different exterior panels and an electric folding fabric roof.

Kia Eco_cee'd

Kia revealed a concept of its Pro_cee'd line, with improved aerodynamics and mild hybrid engine tuning to their diesel engine, under the name "Eco_cee'd". The concept models were fitted with ISG (Idle Stop&Go) and regenerative braking.

Hybrid version

Kia previewed a hybrid Cee'd concept at the 2008 Paris Motor Show, and operates an evaluation fleet of in Europe—with the hybrid models featuring an electric motor, powered by a high-voltage battery mounted behind the rear seats.

== In popular culture ==
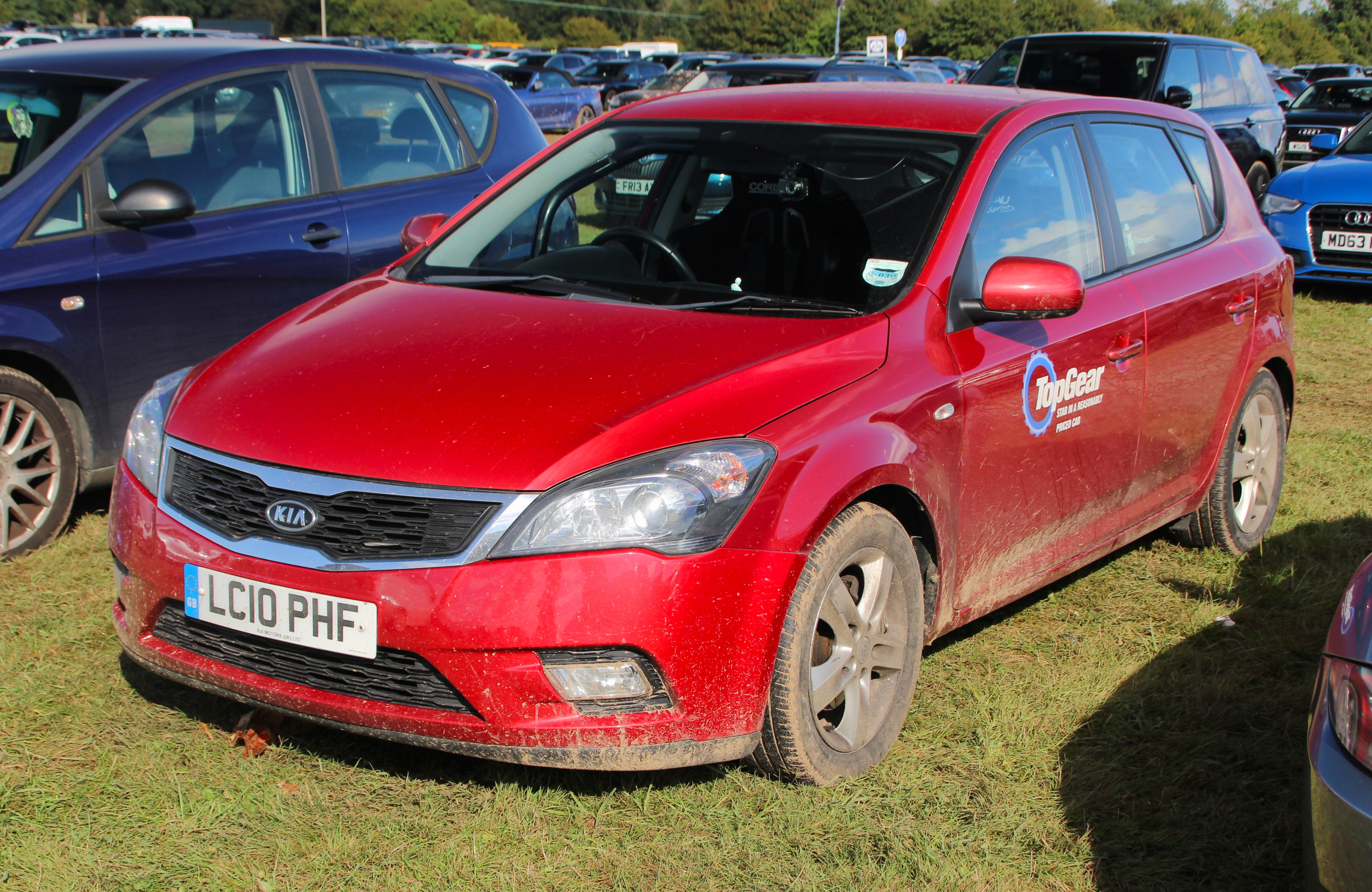
Kia Cee'd used in Top Gear

On 27 June 2010, the Kia Cee'd was revealed as the new reasonably priced car for the "Star in a Reasonably-Priced Car" segment of the top-rated UK television programme Top Gear, where presenter Jeremy Clarkson incorrectly and persistently pronounces the name as "Cee-apostrophe-d" and describes it as "the only car with an apostrophe in its name." The version used had a kerb weight upwards of 1,263 kg, and was priced at £13,930. The car was eventually replaced in Series 20 by a Vauxhall Astra. Top Gear dented several Cee'ds in a game of car rugby in 2013.

== Motorsport ==
The Kia Cee'd has been homologated for TCR-specification series and is manufactured and supplied by Austrian company STARD. Kia will run a factory-supported team in the Scandinavian Touring Car Championship in 2017.

The Pro Cee'd serves as an official safety car in Poland's Kia Lotos Race, a racing organization created by Kia Motors Polska and Grupa Lotos.

== Outside Europe ==
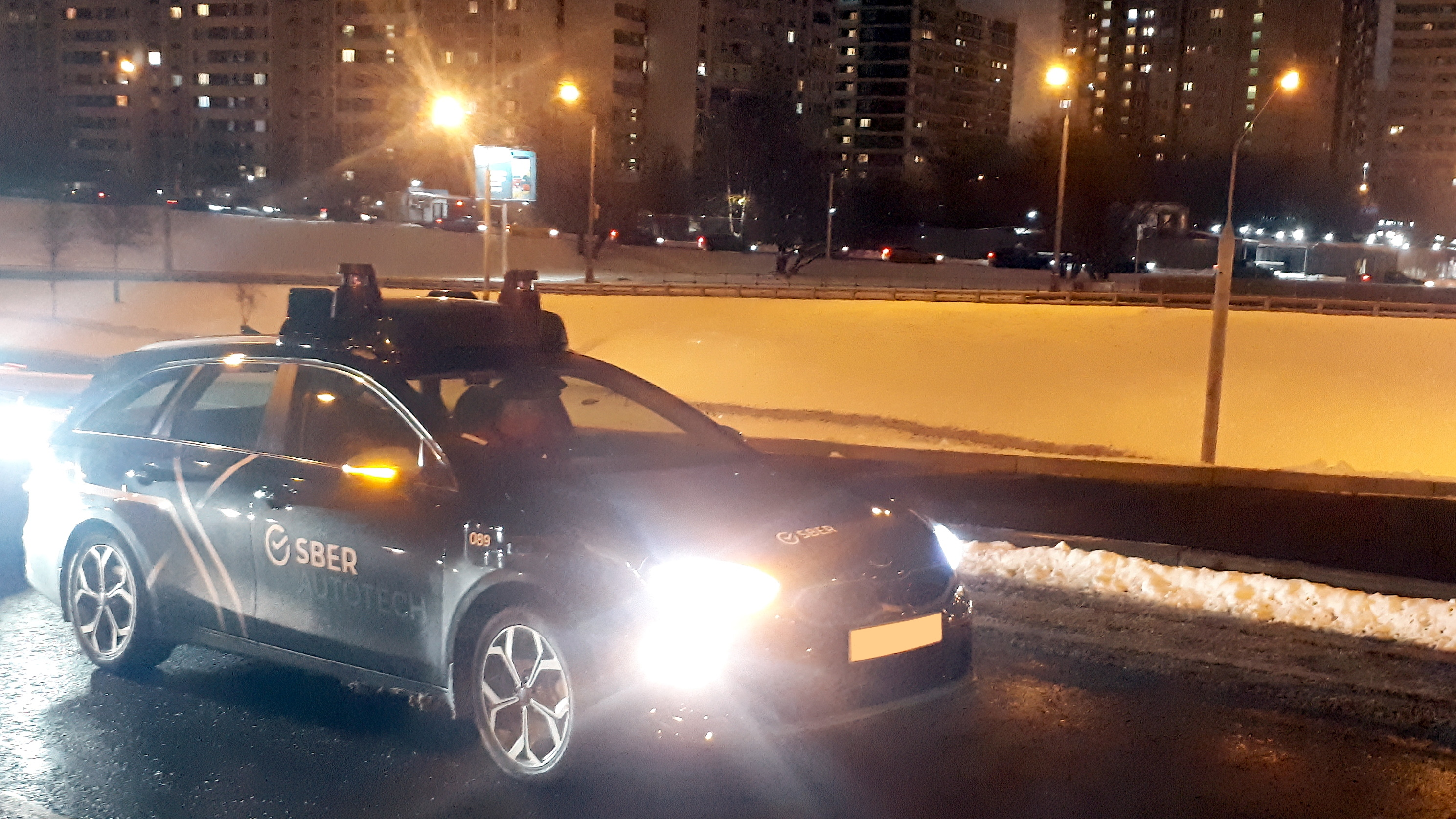
Kia Ceed SW modified for autopilot by Sber AutoTech

The Cee'd was being initially available only in the markets of Europe, Israel and South Africa.

In Russia and Kazakhstan, the first two generations of Cee'd were sold alongside the Kia Forte.

Kia began selling Cee'd models in Morocco since 2010. As of 2020, Kia still sells Cee'd models in Morocco, alongside the Kia Cerato.

In 2014, the Pro_Cee'd GT was being sold in Israel, Australia and New Zealand. In 2015, Kia Australia announced that the Pro_Cee'd GT would no longer be offered in 2016, registering just 746 units over the two years on sale.

== Reception ==
- Auto Express – New Car Honours – Special Honour for seven-year warranty
- Autocar – 'Idea of the Year' for Cee'd seven-year warranty
- What Diesel Car? – Hatchback of the year
- Towcar awards 2007
- Camping Fritid (Danish Camping magazine, from DCU) – Camping car of the year 2007
- UK survey, Cee'd ranked in first place in the Driver Power's Compact Family category to beat out Volkswagen, Toyota, Fiat and other notable competitors in the segment. Driver Power is Auto Express's car owner reliability and satisfaction survey which presents the frank and honest views of drivers in the UK.
- Top Gear named it runner up in their car of the year award for 2009 (broadcast 3 January 2010). They then named it as their new "reasonably priced car" from series 15 to series 20.
- German auto magazine ACE Lenkrad, Kia Cee'd surpassed the Toyota Auris and the Volkswagen Golf.
- German auto magazine Autobild, Cee'd was rated higher than the Toyota Auris, Citroen C4 and Honda Civic.
- Austrian auto magazine Autotouring (2007.4); Cee'd was rated above Toyota Auris, Volkswagen Golf, Mazda 3.
- Danish auto magazine Motor, Kia Cee'd is the first car to ever earn the 6-out-of-6 rating.
- Swedish magazine Vi Bilägare found in the yearly long-distance test (one year, 40 000 km; 25,000 miles) that Kia Cee´d had the highest second-hand value among all cars the magazine had tested through the years.
- German car magazine Autobild tested the Kia Cee'd during 100,000 km (60,000 miles). Just a few flaws, ranked as high.
- France's motoring publication L'Automobile Magazine, The Kia Cee'd won a 2009 quality/reliability survey in the compact-car category.
