= Hyundai Beta engine =

Overview
- Manufacturer: Hyundai Motor Company
- Production: 1995–2012

Layout
- Configuration: Inline-four
- Displacement: 1.6 L (1,599 cc); 1.8 L (1,795 cc); 2.0 L (1,975 cc)
- Cylinder bore: 77.4 mm (3.05 in) (1.6); 82 mm (3.2 in) (1.8/2.0)
- Piston stroke: 85 mm (3.3 in) (1.6/1.8); 93.5 mm (3.68 in) (2.0)
- Cylinder block material: Cast iron
- Cylinder head material: Aluminum alloy
- Valvetrain: Dual overhead camshaft (DOHC)
- Compression ratio: 9.85:1 (1.6); 10.0:1 (1.8); 10.3:1 (2.0)

RPM range
- Idle speed: 700 ± 100 rpm 800 ± 100 rpm

Combustion
- Fuel system: Multipoint injection
- Management: Siemens
- Fuel type: Petrol; LPG
- Oil system: Wet sump
- Cooling system: Liquid-cooled

Output
- Power output: 90–143 PS (66–105 kW; 89–141 hp)
- Torque output: 12.8–19 kg⋅m (93–137 lb⋅ft; 126–186 N⋅m)

Dimensions
- Length: 496.4 mm (19.54 in) (2.0)
- Width: 600–624.8 mm (23.62–24.60 in) (2.0)
- Height: 672–711 mm (26.5–28.0 in) (2.0)
- Dry weight: 141.1–151.4 kg (311–334 lb) (2.0)

Emissions
- Emissions control systems: PCV valve Catalytic converter

Chronology
- Successor: Hyundai Theta engine Hyundai Nu engine

The Hyundai Beta engine is a family of 1.6 L to 2.0 L dual overhead camshaft valvetrain (DOHC) inline four-cylinder engines built in Ulsan, South Korea.

The Beta engine uses a direct-acting overhead cam valvetrain arrangement which places the camshaft in the cylinder head above the pistons and combustion chamber and operates the valve tappets/lifters directly.

The Beta engine's ignition system is designed to ignite the fuel/air charge that enters each cylinder by producing a high voltage spark at the exact moment for maximum efficiency. All versions have a distributorless ignition system.

The Beta engine family includes the following engine codes: G4GR, G4GB, G4GC, G4GF and G4GM.

== Beta ==
=== 1.6 L (G4GR) ===
The 1.6-liter Beta (Engine code: G4GR) is an in-line, spark-ignition 4-stroke, dual overhead camshaft (DOHC) 16 valve engine that had two variants depending on the vehicle's sub-model. Advertised power was 66 kW/ 89 hp/ 90 PS (ECE) and 126 Nm/ 93 lb-ft of torque or 84 kW/113 hp/114 PS (ECE) with 143 Nm / 105 lb-ft of torque depending on market and application.

The engine was assembled from 1995 to 2001 at the Ulsan plant. Unlike other representatives of the Beta series, this engine did not receive the second generation and was replaced by the power unit Alpha II. In a number of markets, a deferred version of 90 hp was sold.

Specification:
Cylinder bore: 77.40 mm/ 3.051 in
Stroke: 85.00 mm/ 3.346 in
Engine Displacement: 1,599 cc (97.6 cu in)
Compression Ratio: 9.85
Firing Order: 1-3-4-2
Idle RPM: 800 ± 100
Ignition Timing at idling speed: BTDC 7°± 5°/800 rpm(Limit: BTDC 10°± 5°/800 rpm)
Cylinder bore: 77.40 mm -77.43 mm
Out-of-roundness and taper of cylinder bore: 0.01 mm
Clearance with piston: 0.02mm - 0.04 mm

Piston:
Piston O.D.: 77.37-77.40 mm
Piston Service size: 0.25, 0.50, 0.75, 1.00 mm (0.010, 0.020, 0.030, 0.039 in.) oversize

Valve Guide:
Installed dimension O.D. (Intake): 14 mm (0.551 in.)
Installed dimension O.D. (Exhaust): 14 mm (0.551 in.)
Service size: 0.05, 0.25, 0.50 mm (0.002, 0.010, 0.020 in.) oversize

The 2nd generation Elantra (J2) and 1997-2000 Hyundai Coupe (RD) were equipped with Beta I G4GR engine and were distributed primarily within the European, Russian, Middle East and parts of Asian General Market. The vehicles sold in this market were equipped with an Adjusting Potentiometer, idle mixture. All models except the engine in the Hyundai Coupe did not include a Mass Air Flow (Air Mass) sensor which can be purchased separately. For aftermarket barometric pressure (MAP) sensor installation, an integrated Manifold Absolute Pressure (MAP) and the Intake Air Temperature (IAT) sensor is available.

==== Applications ====
- Hyundai Elantra (J2) (1995–2000)
- Hyundai Tiburon/Coupe (RD) (1996–2001)

=== 1.8 L (G4GM) ===
The 1.8-liter Hyundai G4GM engine was manufactured from 1995 to 2003 at the Ulsan enterprise and was put on several popular models of the Korean concern, for example the Elantra and Coupe. The motor was assembled for eight years and after it was replaced with the 1.8L Beta II engine.

Specification:

Cylinder bore: 82 mm (3.228 in.)
Stroke: 85 mm (3.346 in.)
Engine Displacement: 1795cc (109.54 cu.in.)
Compression Ratio: 10.0
Firing Order: 1-3-4-2
Idle RPM: 800 ± 100
Ignition Timing at idling speed: BTDC 10°±5°/800 rpm
Cylinder bore: 82.00-82.03 mm (3.2283 - 3.2295 in.)
Out of-roundness & taper of cylinder bore: Less than 0.01 mm (0.0004 in.)
Clearance with piston: 0.02-0.04 mm (0.0008 - 0.0016 in.)

==== Applications ====
- Hyundai Elantra (J2) (1995–2000)
- Hyundai Tiburon/Coupe (RD) (1996–2001)

=== 2.0 L (G4GF) ===
The G4GF (also called the 2.0 D) is the 2.0L (1975cc) version, having debuted in 1997 for the Hyundai Tiburon. It shares the 82 mm bore of the 1.8 but is stroked to 93.5 mm. It has a cast iron engine block and aluminum DOHC cylinder head. It uses MFI fuel injection, has four valves per cylinder and features powdered cast steel connecting rods. OPA Output is 140 hp (102 kW) at 6000 rpm and 133 pound force-feet (180 N⋅m)

The 2.0-liter Hyundai G4GF engine was assembled from 1996 to 2001 at an enterprise in Ulsan. The motor was replaced by the 2.0L Beta II engine.

==== Applications ====
- Hyundai Tiburon/Coupe (1996–2001)
- Hyundai Elantra (J2) (1995 - 2000)

== Beta II ==
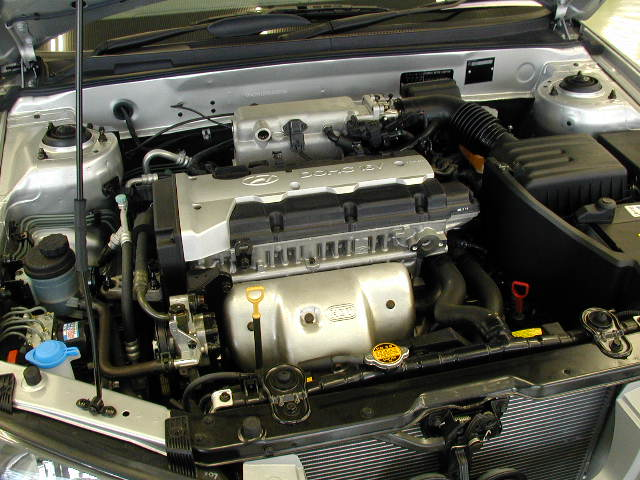
1.8 L G4GB "XD18" Elantra 1.8GL Early Model (JDM)

=== 1.8 L (G4GB) ===
The 1.8-liter Hyundai G4GB engine was manufactured from 2000 to 2010. The motor belonged to the Beta II series therefore had an upgraded design relative to its predecessors.

==== Applications ====
- Hyundai Elantra (XD) (2000–2006)
- Hyundai Matrix (2001–2007)
- Kia Optima (MS) (2000–2005)
- Kia Cerato (LD) (2004–2008)

=== 2.0 L (G4GC) ===
The 2.0-liter Hyundai Beta II engine was produced from 2001 to 2012. The power unit since 2003 was equipped with the Continuously Variable Valve Timing system. The engine has a life expectancy of 300,000 km.

Four-stroke, four-cylinder petrol with electronic control system of fuel injection and ignition, with in-line arrangement of cylinders and pistons rotating one common crankshaft, with the top arrangement of two camshafts (with the CVVT system). The engine has a closed-type liquid cooling system with forced circulation. The lubrication system is combined: under pressure and spraying.

The cylinder head is made of an aluminum alloy. The drive of the camshafts is carried out by a toothed belt. The belt itself drives only the exhaust camshaft. The intake camshaft is driven from the exhaust camshaft by means of an internal chain located at the rear end of the cylinder head, as is the mechanism for changing the valve timing. There are no hydraulic lifters. Adjustment of valve backlash is required every 90,000 km.

During 2001-2002, the engine made its debut in models such as the (XD) Elantra and (GK) Tiburon. Output is 138 hp (102 kW) at 6000 rpm with 136 pound force-feet (184 N⋅m) of torque at 4500 rpm. It has a cast iron engine block and aluminum DOHC cylinder heads.

For the latest version the following changes were noted:

- Redesigned block with external contouring of cylinder bores (instead of flat sides), extra ribbing and one extra transaxle fixing point (now 5)(less NVH)
- Crankshaft now has 8 counterweights instead of 4.(NVH)
- Cast & ribbed aluminium sump pan (instead of pressed steel sheet) with stronger joint to transaxle (NVH)
- Reshaped combustion chambers, ports & pistons (performance, [fuel] economy, emissions)
- 20 mm (0.8 in) longer intake rams, 8% smaller surge tank, resonator added, spark timing and valve lift optimized, lighter valve springs, denser conrod bearings, returnless fuel system (instead of return type) with higher fuel pressure and smaller injectors (torque spread and economy)
- Cylinder head machined to more precise tolerances
- Head gasket now 2-layer (instead of 3)
- Idle speed reduced to 700 rpm from 800 rpm (NVH)
- Hydraulic engine mounts (4) instead of rubber (NVH)
- Heat shield installed between engine and air filter, reducing heating of induction air.
- New camcover with I-piece high-specific gravity polypropylene baffle (ilo 2-piece pp)
- Oil flow reduced (economy)
- Mechanical valve lash adjusters (solid lifters) replace hydraulic, improving valve clearance precision (durability).
- Lower valve spring load reduces valve train friction (performance).
- Engine cover installed (NVH and dress up engine bay)
- Catalytic converter now upstream adjoining exhaust manifold (ilo under car) (emissions)
- Other detail changes to: alternator, intake manifold brace, power steering & a/c pulleys, idle speed actuator, oil filler cap & drive plate between engine & torque converter

In 2008 the Beta II was modified to produce 143 horsepower (107 kW) and 137 lb⋅ft (186 N⋅m) of torque.

==== Applications ====
- Hyundai Elantra (XD/HD) (2000–2010)
- Hyundai i30 (FD) (2007–2012)
- Hyundai Tiburon/Coupe (2001–2008)
- Hyundai Trajet (2004–2008)
- Hyundai Tucson (JM) (2004–2009)
- Kia Carens (RS) (2002–2006)
- Kia Cee'd (ED) (2006–2012)
- Kia Cerato (LD) (2003–2008)
- Kia Soul (AM) (2008–2011)
- Kia Sportage (KM) (2004–2010)
- Kia Spectra (2005-2009)

== Beta LPG ==
=== 2.0 L (L4GC) ===
The 2.0 L (1,975 cc) engine features LPI injection and makes 123 PS (90 kW; 121 hp) at 5,500 rpm with 17.5 kg⋅m (127 lb⋅ft; 172 N⋅m) of torque at 3,000 rpm.

==== Applications ====
- Kia Carens (RS) (1999–2006)
- Hyundai Sonata
- Kia Optima

== See also ==
- List of Hyundai engines
