= RD2 =

RD2 may refer to:

- RD2, a generation of the Hyundai Tiburon produced from 1999 to 2001
- RD2, a research department of the Potsdam Institute for Climate Impact Research
