= MAFless Tuning =

Engine tuning with no mass airflow meter

MAFless tuning is a method of operating the fuel injection system on a gasoline-powered motor vehicle whereby the mass airflow meter, or MAF, is removed.

== The MAF ==
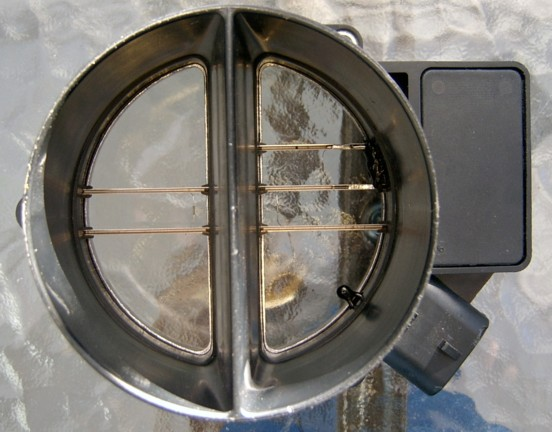
MAF fitted to a GM LS1 engine in a VZ Holden Commodore – a wire mesh screen is normally installed across the front of the MAF to smooth airflow across the wire elements – this has been removed in this photograph to show the wires

The MAF is a component in a vehicle's intake system through which air flows past a wire that is heated by an electric current. The airflow cools the wire, enabling the MAF to calculate the mass of airflow into the engine. The vehicle's engine management computer then uses this information to calculate the correct amount of fuel to be delivered to the cylinders by the fuel injection system.

== Removing the MAF ==
When tuning a MAF-equipped vehicle to operate in MAFless mode, the MAF is removed. This requires the use of an alternative method of calculating airflow into the engine, which is also referred to as 'Speed-Density' system, as opposed to a MAF system. On vehicles so equipped, this alternative involves the use of a manifold absolute pressure, or MAP, sensor. The MAP sensor measures pressure in the engine's inlet manifold. When coupled with data regarding the engine's revolutions per minute, or RPM, and a table of volumetric efficiency over the operating range of the engine, the MAP sensor can be used by the engine management computer to calculate fuel requirements.

== Advantages ==
By changing the engine from MAF mode to MAFless/MAP mode, vehicle modifiers claim two advantages:

- The MAF may pose a small physical restriction across the vehicle's intake tract, thereby reducing airflow into the engine. By removing the MAF this restriction is purportedly eliminated, possibly improving engine performance.
- By moving the airflow measurement sensor from the intake plumbing to a point closer to the cylinders, the time lag from air moving past the sensor to reaching the cylinder can be reduced, thereby possibly improving throttle response.

== Disadvantages ==
A potential disadvantage of converting an engine from MAF to MAFless mode is that where the MAP sensor is used to measure airflow, the corresponding fuel calculations must be performed by the computer based on tables of information programmed by the engine tuner. If other parts of the engine are subsequently modified with an effect on airflow through the engine, these fuel tables must be adjusted to match the revised engine hardware. As airflow is measured from the MAP sensor, turbocharger variations will affect the fuel flow measurement resulting in higher or lower fuel flow. Without MAF, monitoring of the airflow is very difficult, and so the chances of reproducibility of the desired performance in the field is much less. EGR with the feedback system and exhaust sensors are necessary to lower the chances of engine to engine variation in performance. By contrast, when operating in MAF mode the computer can automatically adjust its fuel delivery based on the airflow data generated by the MAF, even if other engine hardware is changed.

Another small disadvantage is as the engine wears, the mean vacuum is decreased. This 'fools' the MAP sensor into overfuelling. This is only a problem on very high mileage engines.

== Applications ==
MAFless tuning is a popular modification in Australia for Holden vehicles powered by the General Motors LS1 Gen III 5.7 V8 engine. The genesis for MAFless tuning of the LS1 in Australia was the HSV GTS version of the Holden Commodore, which was factory fitted with a Callaway-developed C4B version of that engine running in MAFless mode. Rated at 300 kW, the C4B was the most powerful factory LS1 sold in Australia and created substantial credibility for MAFless tuning of LS1 V8s. Within days of the HSV GTS's release the CSV Veloce was on the Australian market with a 330 kW LS1 incorporating a MAFless configuration. The MAFless configuration was later dropped by HSV and subsequent cars have all had MAF's. MAFless tuned LS engine equipped vehicles never eventuated in the United States as the C5 Corvette with the same engine was always fitted with a MAF sensor. It featured a larger MAF sensor body than the ones installed in the Australian cars, to avoid any intake restriction issues and still deliver accurate injection at all times.

North American tuners (and also the Australian manufacturers & tuners Holden & HSV) of the LS1 tend to prefer retaining the MAF sensor, instead more simply overcoming intake tract restrictions by installing a MAF with a larger diameter body. In this way, precise fuel injection metering is still retained at all engine speeds and loads. Australian tuners in comparison, prefer to use the less precise method of MAFless tuning (see 'Disadvantages' section above), requiring the engine computer to use predetermined fueling tables, resulting in less finely tuned injection systems that cannot adjust for other variables or engine hardware changes accurately.
