= Mass airflow =

Mass airflow may refer to:

- Mass Airflow Meter
- MAFless Tuning
- Airflow, as measured in units of mass per unit of time
