= Nanosensor =

Extremely small sensors

Nanosensors are nanoscale devices that measure physical quantities and convert these to signals that can be detected and analyzed. There are several ways proposed today to make nanosensors; these include top-down lithography, bottom-up assembly, and molecular self-assembly. There are different types of nanosensors in the market and in development for various applications, most notably in defense, environmental, and healthcare industries. These sensors share the same basic workflow: a selective binding of an analyte, signal generation from the interaction of the nanosensor with the bio-element, and processing of the signal into useful metrics.

== Characteristics ==
Nanomaterials-based sensors have several benefits in sensitivity and specificity over sensors made from traditional materials, due to nanomaterial features not present in bulk material that arise at the nanoscale. Nanosensors can have increased specificity because they operate at a similar scale as natural biological processes, allowing functionalization with chemical and biological molecules, with recognition events that cause detectable physical changes. Enhancements in sensitivity stem from the high surface-to-volume ratio of nanomaterials, as well as novel physical properties of nanomaterials that can be used as the basis for detection, including nanophotonics. Nanosensors can also potentially be integrated with nanoelectronics to add native processing capability to the nanosensor.

In addition to their sensitivity and specificity, nanosensors offer significant advantages in cost and response times, making them suitable for high-throughput applications. Nanosensors provide real-time monitoring compared to traditional detection methods such as chromatography and spectroscopy. These traditional methods may take days to weeks to obtain results and often require investment in capital costs as well as time for sample preparation.

One-dimensional nanomaterials such as nanowires and nanotubes are well suited for use in nanosensors, as compared to bulk or thin-film planar devices. They can function both as transducers and wires to transmit the signal. Their high surface area can cause large signal changes upon binding of an analyte. Their small size can enable extensive multiplexing of individually addressable sensor units in a small device. Their operation is also "label free" in the sense of not requiring fluorescent or radioactive labels on the analytes. Zinc oxide nanowire is used for gas sensing applications, given that it exhibits high sensitivity toward low concentration of gas under ambient conditions and can be fabricated easily with low cost.

There are several challenges for nanosensors, including avoiding drift and fouling, developing reproducible calibration methods, applying preconcentration and separation methods to attain a proper analyte concentration that avoids saturation, and integrating the nanosensor with other elements of a sensor package in a reliable manufacturable manner. Because nanosensors are a relatively new technology, there are many unanswered questions regarding nanotoxicology, which currently limits their application in biological systems.

Potential applications for nanosensors include medicine, detection of contaminants and pathogens, and monitoring manufacturing processes and transportation systems. By measuring changes in physical properties (volume, concentration, displacement and velocity, gravitational, electrical, and magnetic forces, pressure, or temperature) nanosensors may be able to distinguish between and recognize certain cells at the molecular level in order to deliver medicine or monitor development to specific places in the body. The type of signal transduction defines the major classification system for nanosensors. Some of the main types of nanosensor readouts include optical, mechanical, vibrational, or electromagnetic.

As an example of classification, nanosensors that use molecularly imprinted polymers (MIP) can be divided into three categories, which are electrochemical, piezoelectric, or spectroscopic sensors. Electrochemical sensors induce a change in the electrochemical properties of the sensing material, which includes charge, conductivity, and electric potential. Piezoelectric sensors either convert mechanical force into electric force or vice versa. This force is then transduced into a signal. MIP spectroscopic sensors can be divided into three subcategories, which are chemiluminescent sensors, surface plasmon resonance sensors, and fluorescence sensors. As the name suggests, these sensors produce light based signals in forms of chemiluminescence, resonance, and fluorescence. As described by the examples, the type of change that the sensor detects and type of signal it induces depend on the type of sensor

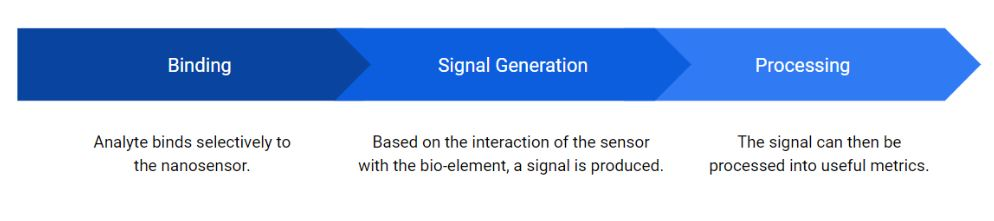
Overview of a general nanosensor workflow.

== Mechanisms of operation ==
There are multiple mechanisms by which a recognition event can be transduced into a measurable signal; generally, these take advantage of the nanomaterial sensitivity and other unique properties to detect a selectively bound analyte.

Electrochemical nanosensors are based on detecting a resistance change in the nanomaterial upon binding of an analyte, due to changes in scattering or to the depletion or accumulation of charge carriers. One possibility is to use nanowires such as carbon nanotubes, conductive polymers, or metal oxide nanowires as gates in field-effect transistors, although as of 2009 they had not yet been demonstrated in real-world conditions. Chemical nanosensors contain a chemical recognition system (receptor) and a physiochemical transducer, in which the receptor interacts with analyte to produce electrical signals. In one case, upon interaction of the analyte with the receptor, the nanoporous transducer had a change in impedance which was determined as the sensor signal. Other examples include electromagnetic or plasmonic nanosensors, spectroscopic nanosensors such as surface-enhanced Raman spectroscopy, magnetoelectronic or spintronic nanosensors, and mechanical nanosensors.

Biological nanosensors consist of a bio-receptor and a transducer. The transduction method of choice is currently fluorescence because of the high sensitivity and relative ease of measurement. The measurement can be achieved by using the following methods: binding active nanoparticles to active proteins within the cell, using site-directed mutagenesis to produce indicator proteins, allowing for real-time measurements, or by creating a nanomaterial (e.g. nanofibers) with attachment sites for the bio-receptors. Even though electrochemical nanosensors can be used to measure intracellular properties, they are typically less selective for biological measurements, as they lack the high specificity of bio-receptors (e.g. antibody, DNA).

Photonic devices can also be used as nanosensors to quantify concentrations of clinically relevant samples. A principle of operation of these sensors is based on the chemical modulation of a hydrogel film volume that incorporates a Bragg grating. As the hydrogel swells or shrinks upon chemical stimulation, the Bragg grating changes color and diffracts light at different wavelengths. The diffracted light can be correlated with the concentration of a target analyte.

Another type of nanosensor is one that works through a colorimetric basis. Here, the presence of the analyte causes a chemical reaction or morphological alteration for a visible color change to occur. One such application, is that gold nanoparticles can be used for the detection of heavy metals. Many harmful gases can also be detected by a colorimetric change, such as through the commercially available Dräger Tube. These provide an alternative to bulky, lab-scale systems, as these can be miniaturized to be used for point-of-sample devices. For example, many chemicals are regulated by the Environmental Protection Agency and require extensive testing to ensure contaminant levels are within the appropriate limits. Colorimetric nanosensors provide a method for on-site determination of many contaminants.

== Production methods ==
The production method plays a central role in determining the characteristics of the manufactured nanosensor in that the function of nanosensor can be made through controlling the surface of nanoparticles. There are two main approaches in the manufacturing of nanosensors: top-down methods, which begin with a pattern generated at a larger scale, and then reduced to microscale. Bottom-up methods start with atoms or molecules that build up to nanostructures.

=== Top-down methods ===
==== Lithography ====
It involves starting out with a larger block of some material and carving out the desired form. These carved out devices, notably put to use in specific microelectromechanical systems used as microsensors, generally only reach the micro size, but the most recent of these have begun to incorporate nanosized components. One of the most common method is called electron beam lithography. Although very costly, this technique effectively forms a distribution of circular or ellipsoidal plots on the two dimensional surface. Another method is electrodeposition, which requires conductive elements to produce miniaturized devices.

==== Fiber pulling ====
This method consists in using a tension device to stretch the major axis of a fiber while it is heated, to achieve nano-sized scales. This method is specially used in optical fiber to develop optical-fiber-based nanosensors.

==== Chemical etching ====
Two different types of chemical etching have been reported. In the Turner method, a fiber is etched to a point while placed in the meniscus between hydrofluoric acid and an organic overlayer. This technique has been shown to produce fibers with large taper angles (thus increasing the light reaching the tip of the fiber) and tip diameters comparable to the pulling method. The second method is tube etching, which involves etching an optical fiber with a single-component solution of hydrogen fluoride. A silica fiber, surrounded with an organic cladding, is polished and one end is placed in a container of hydrofluoric acid. The acid then begins to etch away the tip of the fiber without destroying the cladding. As the silica fiber is etched away, the polymer cladding acts as a wall, creating microcurrents in the hydrofluoric acid that, coupled with capillary action, cause the fiber to be etched into the shape of a cone with large, smooth tapers. This method shows much less susceptibility to environmental parameters than the Turner method.

=== Bottom-up methods ===
This type of methods involve assembling the sensors out of smaller components, usually individual atoms or molecules. This is done by arranging atoms in specific patterns, which has been achieved in laboratory tests through use of atomic force microscopy, but is still difficult to achieve en masse and is not economically viable.

==== Self-assembly ====
Also known as "growing", this method most often entails an already complete set of components that would automatically assemble themselves into a finished product. Accurately being able to reproduce this effect for a desired sensor in a laboratory would imply that scientists could manufacture nanosensors much more quickly and potentially far more cheaply by letting numerous molecules assemble themselves with little or no outside influence, rather than having to manually assemble each sensor.

Although the conventional fabrication techniques have proven to be efficient, further improvements in the production method can lead to minimization of cost and enhancement in performance. Challenges with current production methods include uneven distribution, size, and shape of nanoparticles, which all lead to limitation in performance. In 2006, researchers in Berlin patented their invention of a novel diagnostic nanosensor fabricated with nanosphere lithography (NSL), which allows precise control oversize and shape of nanoparticles and creates nanoislands. The metallic nanoislands produced an increase in signal transduction and thus increased sensitivity of the sensor. The results also showed that the sensitivity and specification of the diagnostic nanosensor depend on the size of the nanoparticles, that decreasing the nanoparticle size increases the sensitivity.

Current density is influenced by distribution, size, or shape of nanoparticles. These properties can be improved by exploitation of capillary forces. In recent research, capillary forces were induced by applying five microliters of ethanol and, as result, individual nanoparticles have been merged in a larger islands (i.e. 20 micrometer-sized) particles separated by 10 micrometers on average, while the smaller ones were dissolved and absorbed. On the other hand, applying twice as much (i.e. 10 microliters) of ethanol has damaged the nanolayers, while applying too small (i.e. two microliters) of ethanol has failed to spread across them.

== Applications ==
One of the first working examples of a synthetic nanosensor was built by researchers at the Georgia Institute of Technology in 1999. It involved attaching a single particle onto the end of a carbon nanotube and measuring the vibrational frequency of the nanotube both with and without the particle. The discrepancy between the two frequencies allowed the researchers to measure the mass of the attached particle.

Since then, increasing amounts of research have gone into nanosensors, whereby modern nanosensors have been developed for many applications. Currently, the applications of nanosensors in the market include: healthcare, defense and military, and others such as food, environment, and agriculture.

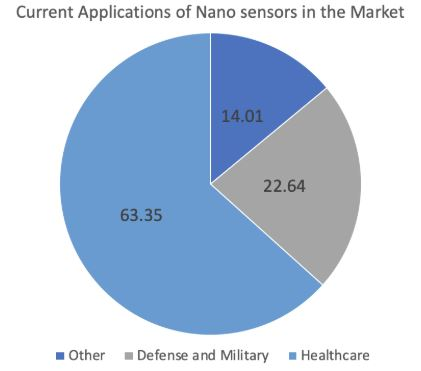
Brief breakdown of current industry applications of nanosensors.

=== Defense and military ===
Nanoscience as a whole has many potential applications in the defense and military sector- including chemical detection, decontamination, and forensics. Some nanosensors in development for defense applications include nanosensors for the detection of explosives or toxic gases. Such nanosensors work on the principle that gas molecules can be distinguished based on their mass using, for example, piezoelectric sensors. If a gas molecule is adsorbed at the surface of the detector, the resonance frequency of the crystal changes and this can be measured as a change in electrical properties. In addition, field effect transistors, used as potentiometers, can detect toxic gases if their gate is made sensitive to them.

In a similar application, nanosensors can be utilized in military and law enforcement clothing and gear. The Navy Research Laboratory's Institute for Nanoscience has studied quantum dots for application in nanophotonics and identifying biological materials. Nanoparticles layered with polymers and other receptor molecules will change color when contacted by analytes such as toxic gases. This alerts the user that they are in danger. Other projects involve embedding clothing with biometric sensors to relay information regarding the user's health and vitals, which would be useful for monitoring soldiers in combat.

Surprisingly, some of the most challenging aspects in creating nanosensors for defense and military use are political in nature, rather than technical. Many different government agencies must work together to allocate budgets and share information and progress in testing; this can be difficult with such large and complex institutions. In addition, visas and immigration status can become an issue for foreign researchers - as the subject matter is very sensitive, government clearance can sometimes be required. Finally, there are currently not well defined or clear regulations on nanosensor testing or applications in the sensor industry, which contributes to the difficulty of implementation.

=== Food and the environment ===
Nanosensors can improve various sub-areas within food and environment sectors including food processing, agriculture, air and water quality monitoring, and packaging and transport. Due to their sensitivity, as well as their tunability and resulting binding selectivity, nanosensors are very effective and can be designed for a wide variety of environmental applications. Such applications of nanosensors help in a convenient, rapid, and ultrasensitive assessment of many types of environmental pollutants.

Chemical sensors are useful for analyzing odors from food samples and detecting atmospheric gases. The "electronic nose" was developed in 1988 to determine the quality and freshness of food samples using traditional sensors, but more recently the sensing film has been improved with nanomaterials. A sample is placed in a chamber where volatile compounds become concentrated in the gas phase, whereby the gas is then pumped through the chamber to carry the aroma to the sensor that measures its unique fingerprint. The high surface area to volume ratio of the nanomaterials allows for greater interaction with analytes and the nanosensor's fast response time enables the separation of interfering responses. Chemical sensors, too, have been built using nanotubes to detect various properties of gaseous molecules. Many carbon nanotube based sensors are designed as field effect transistors, taking advantage of their sensitivity. The electrical conductivity of these nanotubes will change due to charge transfer and chemical doping by other molecules, enabling their detection. To enhance their selectivity, many of these involve a system by which nanosensors are built to have a specific pocket for another molecule. Carbon nanotubes have been used to sense ionization of gaseous molecules while nanotubes made out of titanium have been employed to detect atmospheric concentrations of hydrogen at the molecular level. Some of these have been designed as field effect transistors, while others take advantage of optical sensing capabilities. Selective analyte binding is detected through spectral shift or fluorescence modulation. In a similar fashion, Flood et al. have shown that supramolecular host–guest chemistry offers quantitative sensing using Raman scattered light as well as SERS.

Other types of nanosensors, including quantum dots and gold nanoparticles, are currently being developed to detect pollutants and toxins in the environment. These take advantage of the localized surface plasmon resonance (LSPR) that arises at the nanoscale, which results in wavelength specific absorption. This LSPR spectrum is particularly sensitive, and its dependence on nanoparticle size and environment can be used in various ways to design optical sensors. To take advantage of the LSPR spectrum shift that occurs when molecules bind to the nanoparticle, their surfaces can be functionalized to dictate which molecules will bind and trigger a response. For environmental applications, quantum dot surfaces can be modified with antibodies that bind specifically to microorganisms or other pollutants. Spectroscopy can then be used to observe and quantify this spectrum shift, enabling precise detection, potentially on the order of molecules. Similarly, fluorescent semiconducting nanosensors may take advantage of fluorescence resonance energy transfer (FRET) to achieve optical detection. Quantum dots can be used as donors, and will transfer electronic excitation energy when positioned near acceptor molecules, thus losing their fluorescence. These quantum dots can be functionalized to determine which molecules will bind, upon which fluorescence will be restored. Gold nanoparticle-based optical sensors can be used to detect heavy metals very precisely; for example, mercury levels as low as 0.49 nanometers. This sensing modality takes advantage of FRET, in which the presence of metals inhibits the interaction between quantum dots and gold nanoparticles, and quenches the FRET response. Another potential implementation takes advantage of the size dependence of the LSPR spectrum to achieve ion sensing. In one study, Liu et al. functionalized gold nanoparticles with a Pb^{2+} sensitive enzyme to produce a lead sensor. Generally, the gold nanoparticles would aggregate as they approached each other, and the change in size would result in a color change. Interactions between the enzyme and Pb^{2+} ions would inhibit this aggregation, and thus the presence of ions could be detected.

The main challenge associated with using nanosensors in food and the environment is determining their associated toxicity and overall effect on the environment. Currently, there is insufficient knowledge on how the implementation of nanosensors will affect the soil, plants, and humans in the long-term. This is difficult to fully address because nanoparticle toxicity depends heavily on the type, size, and dosage of the particle as well as environmental variables including pH, temperature, and humidity. To mitigate potential risk, research is being done to manufacture safe, nontoxic nanomaterials, as part of an overall effort towards green nanotechnology.

=== Healthcare ===
Nanosensors possess great potential for diagnostic medicine, enabling early identification of disease without reliance on observable symptoms. Ideal nanosensor implementations look to emulate the response of immune cells in the body, incorporating both diagnostic and immune response functionalities, while transmitting data to allow for monitoring of the sensor input and response. However, this model remains a long-term goal, and research is currently focused on the immediate diagnostic capabilities of nanosensors. The intracellular implementation of nanosensor synthesized with biodegradable polymers induces signals that enable real-time monitoring and thus paves way for advancement in drug delivery and treatment.

One example of these nanosensors involves using the fluorescence properties of cadmium selenide quantum dots as sensors to uncover tumors within the body. A downside to the cadmium selenide dots, however, is that they are highly toxic to the body. As a result, researchers are working on developing alternate dots made out of a different, less toxic material while still retaining some of the fluorescence properties. In particular, they have been investigating the particular benefits of zinc sulfide quantum dots which, though they are not quite as fluorescent as cadmium selenide, can be augmented with other metals including manganese and various lanthanide elements. In addition, these newer quantum dots become more fluorescent when they bond to their target cells.

Another application of nanosensors involves using silicon nanowires in IV lines to monitor organ health. The nanowires are sensitive to detect trace biomarkers that diffuse into the IV line through blood which can monitor kidney or organ failure. These nanowires would allow for continuous biomarker measurement, which provides some benefits in terms of temporal sensitivity over traditional biomarker quantification assays such as ELISA.

Nanosensors can also be used to detect contamination in organ implants. The nanosensor is embedded into the implant and detects contamination in the cells surrounding the implant through an electric signal sent to a clinician or healthcare provider. The nanosensor can detect whether the cells are healthy, inflammatory, or contaminated with bacteria. However, a main drawback is found within the long term use of the implant, where tissue grows on top of the sensors, limiting their ability to compress. This impedes the production of electrical charges, thus shortening the lifetime of these nanosensors, as they use the piezoelectric effect to self-power.

Similarly to those used to measure atmospheric pollutants, gold-particle based nanosensors are used to give an early diagnosis to several types of cancer by detecting volatile organic compounds (VOCs) in breath, as tumor growth is associated with peroxidation of the cell membrane. Another cancer related application, though still in mice probing stage, is the use of peptide-coated nanoparticles as activity-based sensors to detect lung cancer. The two main advantages of the use of nanoparticles to detect diseases is that it allows early stage detection, as it can detect tumors the size in the order of millimeters. It also provides a cost-effective, easy-to-use, portable, and non-invasive diagnostic tool.

A recent effort towards advancement in nanosensor technology has employed molecular imprinting, which is a technique used to synthesize polymer matrices that act as a receptor in molecular recognition. Analogous to the enzyme-substrate lock and key model, molecular imprinting uses template molecules with functional monomers to form polymer matrices with specific shape corresponding to its target template molecules, thus increasing the selectivity and affinity of the matrices. This technique has enabled nanosensors to detect chemical species. In the field of biotechnology, molecularly imprinted polymers (MIP) are synthesized receptors that have shown promising, cost-effective alternatives to natural antibodies in that they are engineered to have high selectivity and affinity. For example, an experiment with MI sensor containing nanotips with non-conductive polyphenol nano-coating (PPn coating) showed selective detection of E7 protein and thus demonstrated potential use of these nanosensors in detection and diagnosis of human papillomavirus, other human pathogens, and toxins. As shown above, nanosensors with molecular imprinting technique are capable of selectively detecting ultrasensitive chemical species in that by artificially modifying the polymer matrices, molecular imprinting increases the affinity and selectivity. Although molecularly imprinted polymers provide advantages in selective molecular recognition of nanosensors, the technique itself is relatively recent and there still remains challenges such as attenuation signals, detection systems lacking effective transducers, and surfaces lacking efficient detection. Further investigation and research on the field of molecularly imprinted polymers is crucial for development of highly effective nanosensors.

In order to develop smart health care with nanosensors, a network of nanosensors, often called nanonetwork, need to be established to overcome the size and power limitations of individual nanosensors. Nanonetworks not only mitigates the existing challenges but also provides numerous improvements. Cell-level resolution of nanosensors will enable treatments to eliminate side effects, enable continuous monitoring and reporting of patients' conditions.

Nanonetworks require further study in that nanosensors are different from traditional sensors. The most common mechanism of sensor networks are through electromagnetic communications. However, the current paradigm is not applicable to nanodevices due to their low range and power. Optical signal transduction has been suggested as an alternative to the classical electromagnetic telemetry and has monitoring applications in human bodies. Other suggested mechanisms include bioinspired molecular communications, wired and wireless active transport in molecular communications, Forster energy transfer, and more. It is crucial to build an efficient nanonetwork so that it can be applied in fields such as medical implants, body area networks (BAN), internet of nano things (IoNT), drug delivery and more. With an adept nanonetwork, bio implantable nanodevices can provide higher accuracy, resolution, and safety compared to macroscale implants. Body area networks (BAN) enable sensors and actuators to collect physical and physiological data from the human body to better anticipate any diseases, which will thus facilitate the treatment. Potential applications of BAN include cardiovascular disease monitoring, insulin management, artificial vision and hearing, and hormonal therapy management. The Internet of Bio-Nano Things (IoBNT) refers to networks of nanodevices that can be accessed by the internet. Development of IoBNT has paved the way to new treatments and diagnostic techniques. Nanonetworks may also help drug delivery by increasing localization and circulation time of drugs.

Existing challenges with the aforementioned applications include biocompatibility of the nano implants, physical limitations leading to lack of power and memory storage, and bio compatibility of the transmitter and receiver design of IoBNT. The nanonetwork concept has numerous areas for improvements: these include developing nanomachines, protocol stack issues, power provisioning techniques, and more.

There are still stringent regulations in place for the development of standards for nanosensors to be used in the medical industry, due to insufficient knowledge of the adverse effects of nanosensors as well as potential cytotoxic effects of nanosensors. Additionally, there can be a high cost of raw materials such as silicon, nanowires, and carbon nanotubes, which prevent commercialization and manufacturing of nanosensors requiring scale-up for implementation. To mitigate the drawback of cost, researchers are looking into manufacturing nanosensors made of more cost-effective materials. There is also a high degree of precision needed to reproducibly manufacture nanosensors, due to their small size and sensitivity to different synthesis techniques, which creates additional technical challenges to be overcome.

== See also ==
- Nanotechnology
- List of nanotechnology topics
- Surface plasmon resonance
