= Manumatic =

Type of automotive transmission

The modern usage of the automotive term manumatic denotes an automatic transmission that allows the driver to select a specific gear, typically using paddle-shifters, steering wheel-mounted push-buttons, or "+" and "-" controls on the gear selector.

In the 1950s, the Automotive Products company in the United Kingdom produced an automated clutch system for automobiles called the Manumatic. This system was installed in cars with a manual transmission, allowing them to be driven without needing to use a clutch pedal.

== Automatic transmissions ==
Since the popularization of the hydraulic automatic transmission in the 1940s, many automatic transmissions have allowed indirect control of the gear selection, usually in the form of locking out higher gears. This was provided to allow engine braking on downhills or prevent the use of overdrive gears when towing and was typically achieved using positions such as "3", "2", and "1" on the gear selector.

An automatic transmission with a manumatic function provides a greater level of control by allowing the driver to request an upshift or downshift at a specific time. This is usually achieved using "+" and "-" positions on the gear selector or with paddle-shifters mounted beside the steering wheel. On modern gear selectors with "+" and "-" positions, the positions are on a connected longitudinal gate to the left or right of the standard gear positions. Several Chrysler and Mercedes-Benz vehicles from the 2000s have horizontal gates at the bottom of the shifter pattern. Manufacturers use a variety of tradenames for the manumatic function, as listed below.

The driver often does not have full control of the gear selection, as most manumatic modes will deny a gear change request that would result in the engine stalling (from too few RPM) or over-revving. Some transmissions will hold the requested gear indefinitely, while others will return to automatic gear selection after a period of time.

=== Tradenames ===
- Alfa Romeo: Sportronic, Q-System, Q-Tronic
- Alpina: Switchtronic
- Aston Martin: Touchtronic
- BMW: Steptronic
- Chevrolet / Saturn: TAPshift
- Chrysler / Dodge / Jeep / Ram / Alfa Romeo: AutoStick
- Ford (Australia): Sequential Sports Shift
- Ford (Europe): Tiptronic, DuraShift
- Ford (USA): SelectShift
- Holden: Active Select
- Honda / Acura: S-matic, MultiMatic, SportShift
- Hyundai: Shiftronic, H-Matic
- Infiniti: Manual Shift Mode
- Jaguar: Bosch Mechatronic
- Kia: Sportmatic
- Lancia: Comfortronic
- Land Rover: CommandShift
- Lexus: E-Shift
- Lincoln: SelectShift
- Mazda: ActiveMatic, SportMatic (North America)
- Mercedes-Benz: TouchShift, G-Tronic
- MG-Rover: Steptronic, Stepspeed
- Mitsubishi: INVECS, INVECS-II, Sportronic, Tiptronic
- Nissan: Xtronic (also used in Xtronic CVT), DualMatic M-ATx
- Opel / Vauxhall: ActiveSelect, Tiptronic
- Pontiac: TACshift (Touch Activated Control), TAPshift (Touch Activated Power), Driver Shift Control (DSC)
- Proton: PROTRONIC
- Subaru: Sportshift
- Toyota: Direct Shift, Auto Drive
- Volkswagen / Audi / SEAT / Škoda / Porsche: Tiptronic
- Volvo Cars: Geartronic

== 1950s automated clutch system ==
The Automotive Products company in the United Kingdom produced an automated clutch system for automobiles in the 1950s called the Manumatic. This system is largely unrelated to later use of the term relating to automatic transmissions. The Manumatic was installed in cars with a manual transmission, allowing them to be driven without needing to use a clutch pedal. According to the modern use of the term it would be classified as an automated manual transmission and not as a manumatic transmission.

== See also ==
- Automated manual transmission
- Automatic transmission
- Dual-clutch transmission
