= Hyundai Tiburon =

Sports car

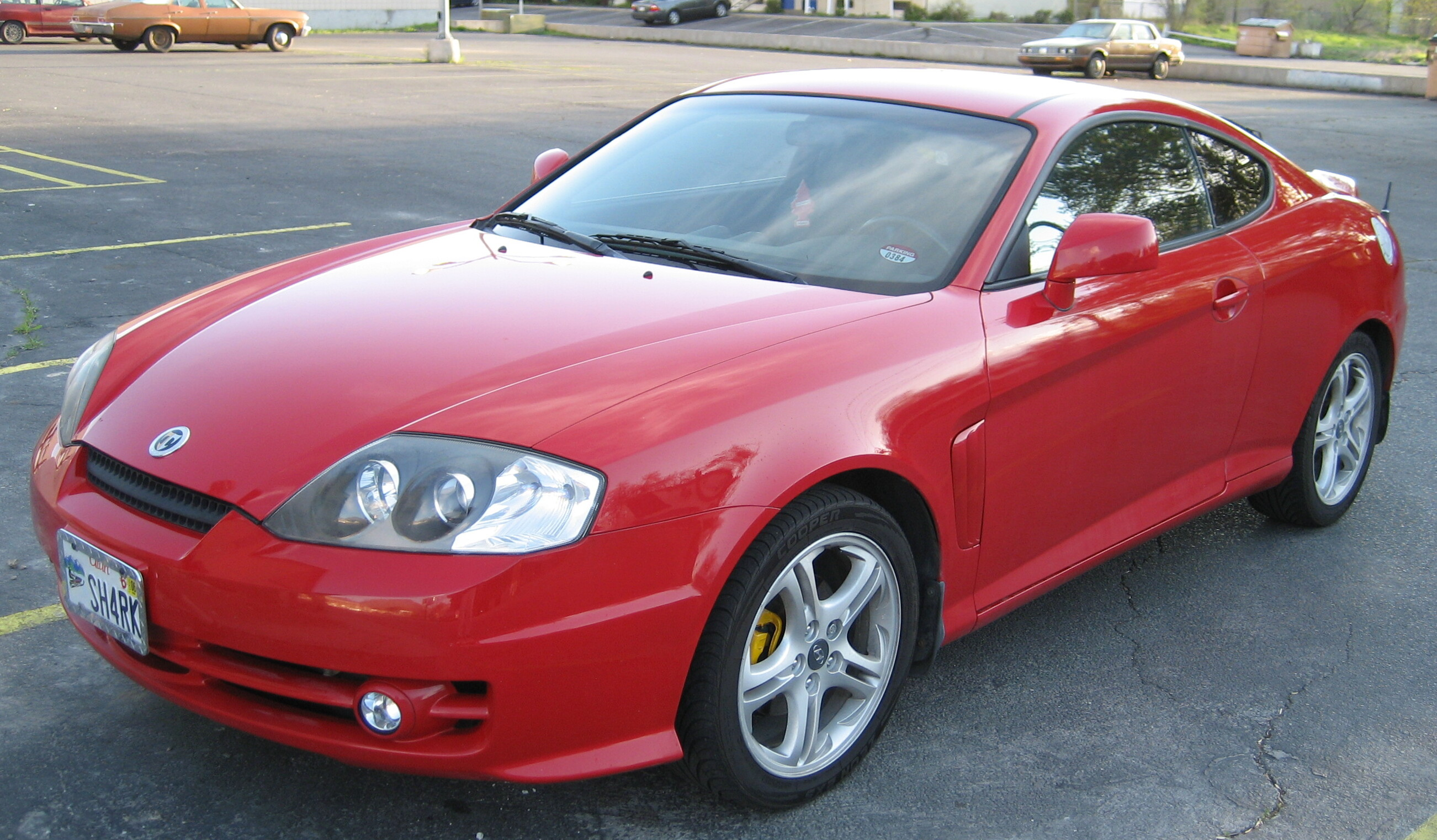

Overview
- Manufacturer: Hyundai
- Also called: Hyundai Coupé
- Production: 1996–2008
- Model years: 1997–2001; 2003–2008

Body and chassis
- Class: Sports car
- Body style: 2-door coupe
- Layout: FF layout

Chronology
- Predecessor: Hyundai Scoupe
- Successor: Hyundai Veloster

The Hyundai Tiburon (Korean: 현대 티뷰론), known in Europe as the Hyundai Coupé (현대 쿠페), is a front wheel drive sports coupe that was produced by the South Korean manufacturer Hyundai from 1996 to 2008.

The name "Tiburon", a slight variation of "tiburón", the Spanish word for "shark", is the name given to the North American, Australian, New Zealand, South African, and Austrian production of the vehicle. It was known as the Hyundai Coupe in some European markets and Indonesia. It had been branded as the Turbulence (터뷸런스) and Tuscani (투스카니) in the home South Korean market.

The model had been released in two generations (RC) over its lifespan and in that time these generations have been subject to periodic facelifts. These facelifts have attempted to keep the car up to date with various safety improvements and a mixture of changes to exterior and interior styling. The RD Tiburon was in production for 5 years from 1996 to 2001. The GK Tiburon was introduced in 2002 (as a 2003 model) and ended production in 2008 before being replaced by the Hyundai Veloster.

== First generation (RD; 1996) ==
First generation
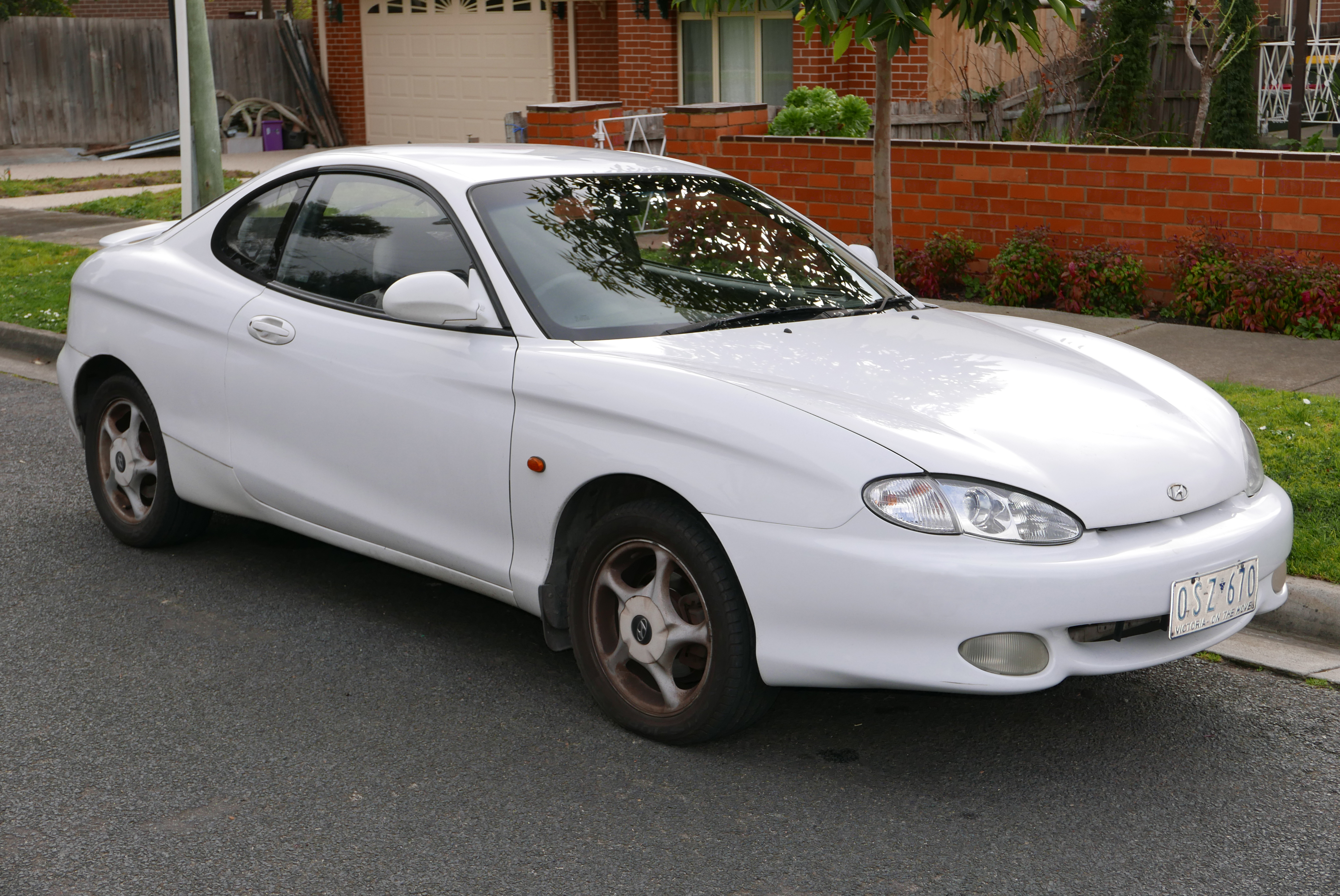

Overview
- Model code: RD
- Also called: Hyundai Turbulence (South Korea; RD2); Hyundai Coupe
- Production: 1996–2001
- Model years: 1997–2001
- Assembly: South Korea: Ulsan

Body and chassis
- Related: Hyundai Avante/Elantra (J2/RD)

Powertrain
- Engine: 1.6 L Beta I4; 1.8 L Beta I4; 2.0 L Beta I4
- Transmission: 5-speed manual; 4-speed automatic

Dimensions
- Wheelbase: 2,475 mm (97.4 in)
- Length: 4,340 mm (170.9 in); 4,345 mm (171.1 in) (Facelift)
- Width: 1,730 mm (68.1 in)
- Height: 1,303 mm (51.3 in)
- Curb weight: 1,160–1,215 kg (2,557–2,679 lb)

=== RD (1996–1999) ===
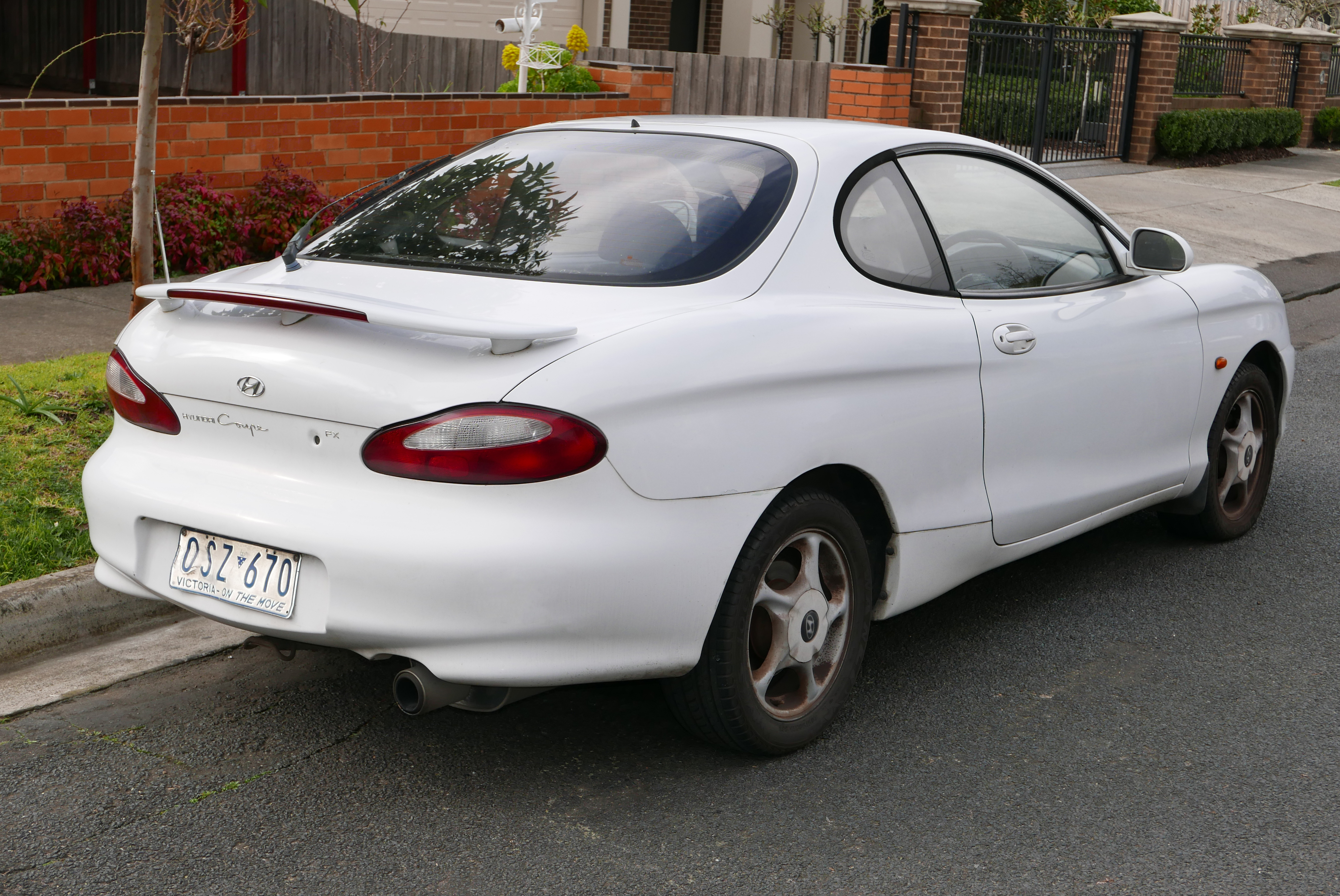
Hyundai Coupe (RD)

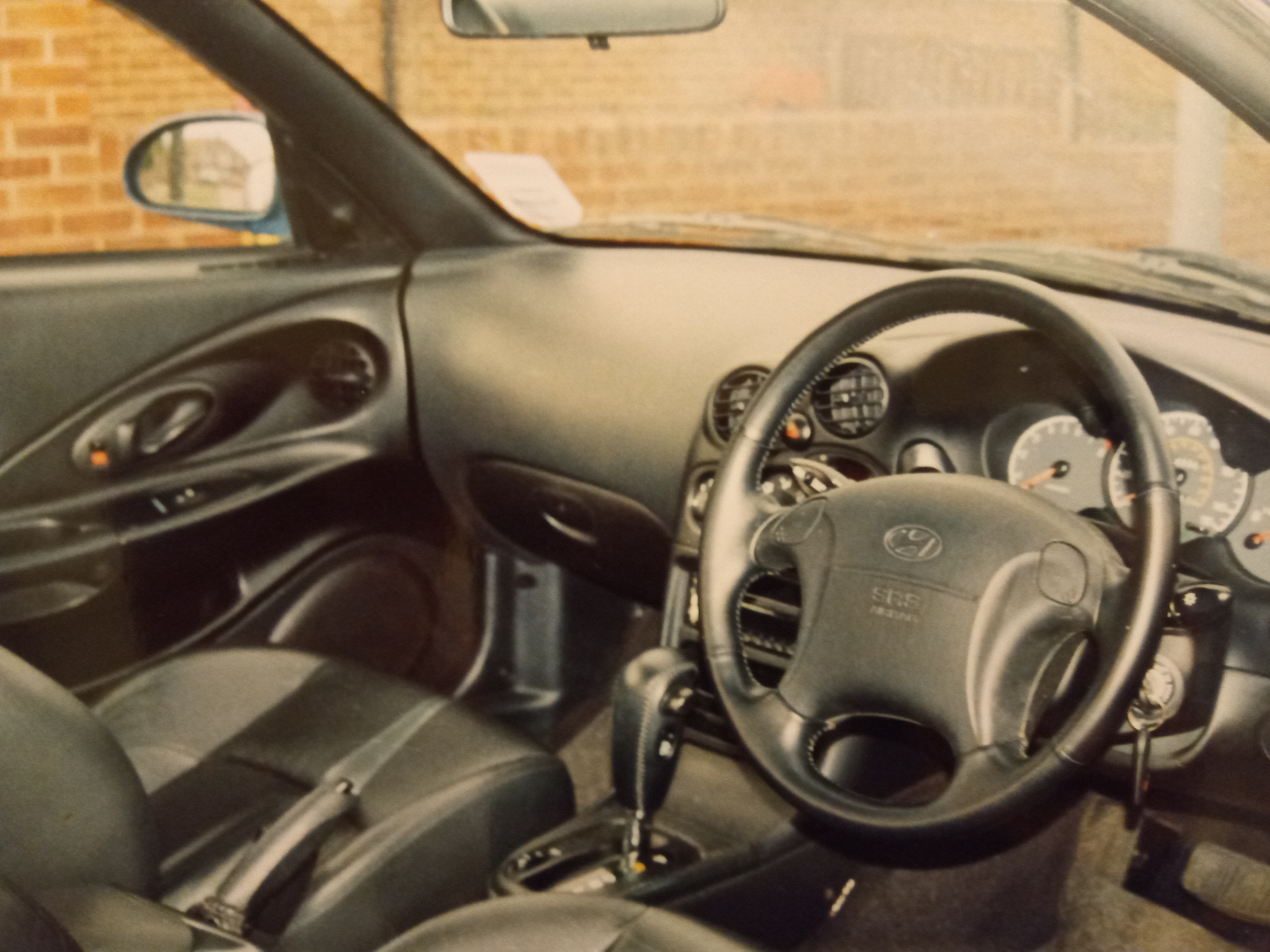
Interior

The Tiburon first began production in late 1996, as 1997 model year. This generation took several design cues from the "HCD-II Epoch" concept that debuted at the 1993 Detroit Auto Show. It was available in a few foreign markets with engine choices of either 1.6L or 1.8L. In the United States, the Tiburon was first offered in 1997 with base models using the Elantra's 1.8L 130 hp (97 kW) engine while the upscale FX received a 2.0L four-cylinder engine. The 2.0L was rated at 140 hp (104 kW) at the crankshaft (the car's manual specifies 102 kW (137 hp) at the flywheel). Base weight was around 2,550 lb (1,150 kg), giving the RD Tiburon a higher power-to-weight ratio than the newer GK 2.0L. The 2.0L produces a 0–60 mph time of ~8.3, with a 1/4 mile time of ~16 seconds. In 1998 the Tiburon lost its weaker 1.8L engine, giving both models the 2.0L. All versions of the Tiburon manufactured from 1996 to 2002 are known as "RD" Tiburons. The MacPherson strut suspension was co-developed with Porsche.

Its appearance was a revival of coke bottle styling, popular during the 1960s and 1970s. There were various options, with or without ABS, 2 airbags, leather, and sunroof.

=== RD Special Editions (UK) – F2 and F2 Evolution ===
Various special editions were also produced, focusing primarily on cosmetic modifications and improvements. In the UK, Hyundai's entrance into the Formula 2 World Rally Championship saw the release of the "F2" and "F2 Evolution" models in 1998 and 1999 respectively.

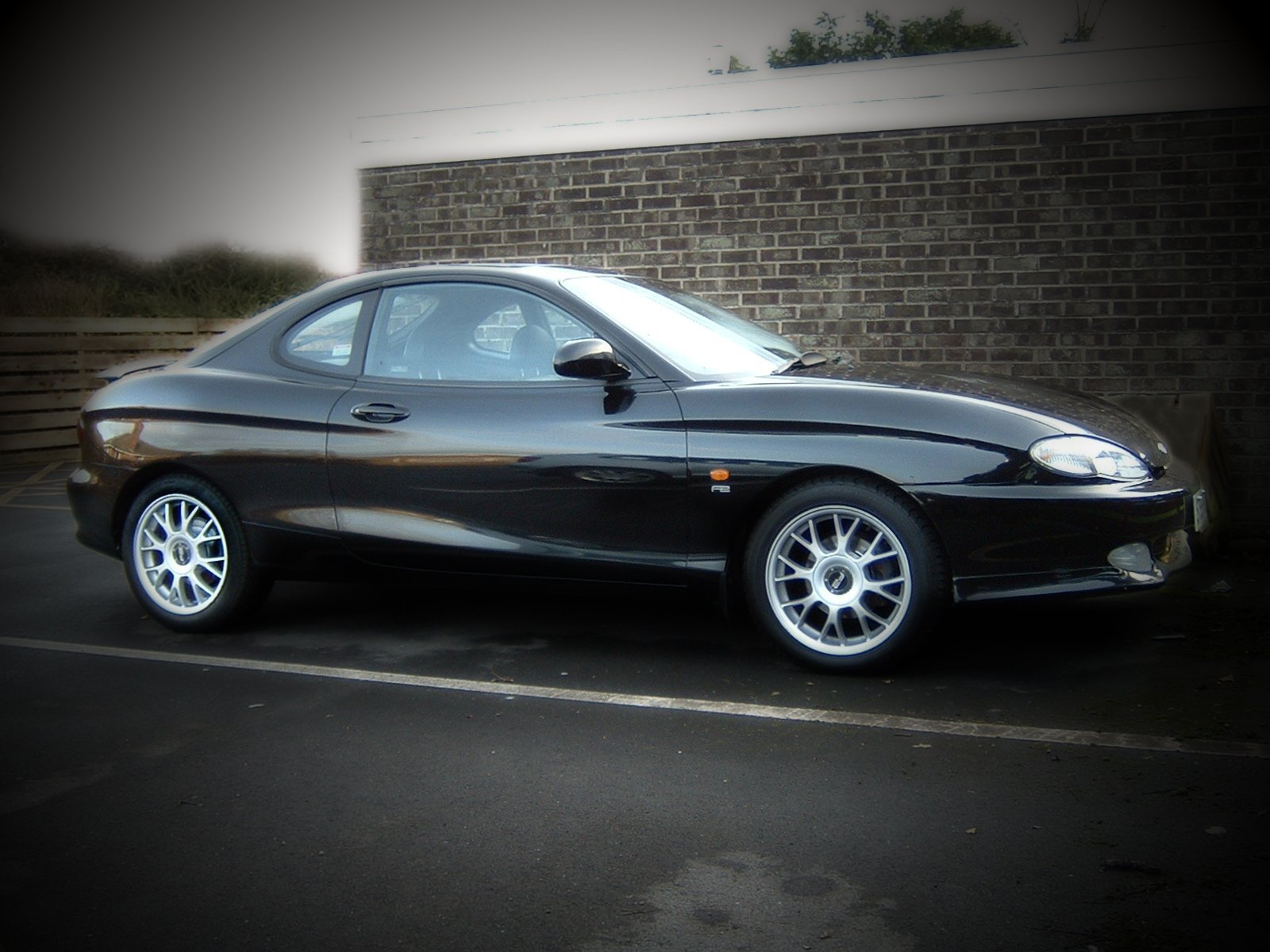
Hyundai Coupe F2 (1998–1999, UK)

The "F2" (non-Evolution) was released in July 1998. Only available in the UK (where it was called the Hyundai Coupe), the "F2" model sold approximately 1100 units in total during 1998 and 1999, (making the "F2" a slightly rarer model than the "F2 Evolution" which followed). An enhanced version of the UK-spec 2.0 SE, the "F2" was available in a choice of three colours; Black (solid), Bright Silver (metallic), or Racing Blue (mica). (This latter colour, a vivid bright blue, was unique to the "F2"; no other Hyundai models were ever made available in Racing Blue (mica)). The "F2" modifications included 16" diameter x 7.5J multi-spoke DTM-style alloy wheels. These wheels were fitted with carbon-fibre effect centre-caps incorporating the "F2" logo within. According to Hyundai's "Coupe F2 Tyre Supplement Handbook", (supplied with each new Coupe F2), these wheels were described as "Motorsport-style alloy wheels". The wheels were actually Team Dynamics DTM, which were manufactured in England by. These wheels were high-quality for an OEM alloy wheel, weighing only 17.6 lbs (8.0 kg) per corner and closely emulating the style of the TSW Hockenheim R.

Tyres were Pirelli 225/40/16 P7000 directional, their 225 width and 40 profile made these the most aggressive standard-fit tyre supplied with any RD (or RD2) Hyundai Coupe. The "F2" also featured a deeper and more aggressive front spoiler, incorporating an oval chrome mesh grille insert. There was also "F2" badging on the front wings and rear valance, an uprated CD/tuner stereo by Sony (CDX C5000R with RDS), "Coupe F2" monogrammed aluminium kick plates, a unique leather-and-aluminium gearstick and a discreet "Coupe F2" badge on the ashtray fascia. The front carpet mats were inlaid with rectangular silver-coloured "Coupe F2" badges. According to the Hyundai Coupe F2 brochure, total on-the-road price was £17,999 (as of July 1998).

Two further items were available free to the first five-hundred Hyundai Coupe F2 buyers. Firstly, there was a large aluminium-bound "F2" art book, (including various artistic photographs and designer images of the Coupe F2). These books were signed inside by rally driver Kenneth Eriksson, (one of Hyundai's drivers in the F2 World Rally Championship at the time). Secondly, there was an aluminium key-fob, fitted with an LED light and supplied in a small silver-coloured box labelled "Lexon Design Concept". Both of these items were packaged together in a large silver cardboard box with "F2" printed onto the lid. These items were supplied by the dealer upon collection of the new car. During 1998, there was prominent press and billboard advertising in the UK to promote the new "Coupe F2". These advertisements incorporated the tag-line, "On average, men think about the F2 every 6 seconds."

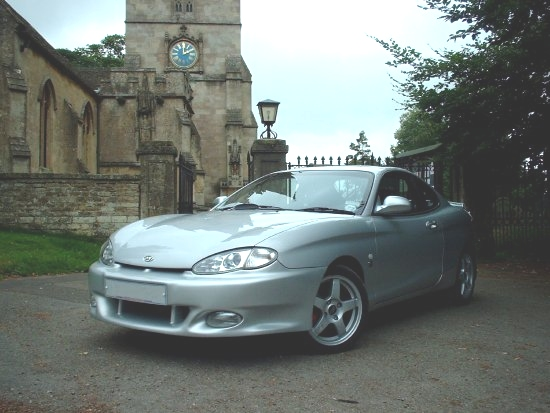
Hyundai Coupe F2 Evolution (UK)

The "F2 Evolution" became available on 14 June 1999, almost one-year after the "F2" had appeared. The "F2" was discontinued and the new "F2 Evolution" effectively replaced it. The "F2 Evolution" was available with just two colour options, either Silver (metallic) or Cobalt Blue (metallic). It was intended as a limited edition of 1500 units, although 1513 units were eventually produced. The design was led by McLaren F1 stylist Peter Stevens in conjunction with Hyundai World Rally Team's support company Motor Sport Developments (MSD).

Standard 2.0 SE Coupes were delivered to MSD for mechanical and cosmetic modification. These modifications included a bigger front bumper/spoiler, a modified (larger and higher) rear spoiler with end-plates (these spoilers were designed by Stevens to create zero lift rather than ultimate downforce), a high-lift inlet camshaft (taken from the 1997 1.8-litre Lantra engine) and a 6"x4" freeflow exhaust by Magnex (suppliers to Aston Martin). Wheels were 16" diameter x 7.0J 5-spoke alloys manufactured by TSW (with Yokohama 205/45/16 tyres). There were "F2 Evolution" badges on the front wings and rear valance. Vehicle security was provided by a Thatcham-approved Category 1 alarm/immobiliser system. Inside, there was an uprated Sony stereo, "Coupe F2 Evolution" monogrammed aluminium kick plates, thicker lambswool carpets, cream instrument dials incorporating "F2 Evolution" logos, front carpet mats inlaid with silver-coloured circular "Coupe F2 Evolution" badges, a stitched leather covered armrest lid between the front seats (rather than the molded plastic found on lesser models), a gear lever gaiter made of smooth leather with a chrome trim surround at the base (manufactured by Richbrook), and a unique gear-knob with a chrome finish. Additionally, new brake pads were co-developed for the F2 Evolution by MSD and AP Racing, these new pads provided better "bite" and improved fade resistance.

The mechanical changes were limited to the camshaft and exhaust improvements. Together these modifications saw an increase in power to 154 hp (115 kW) and torque to 140 lb⋅ft (190 N⋅m).

Each car was supplied with a metal MSD badge. This was fitted onto the bulkhead inside the engine bay. This badge displayed the MSD build number of each particular conversion to "F2 Evolution" spec.

Unlike with the previous year's "F2" model, this time no dealer-supplied art-book was supplied. However, a range of "F2 Evolution" lifestyle accessories were made available through Hyundai dealerships, such as "F2 Evolution" branded pens, chairs, clothing and umbrellas etc.

According to Hyundai's product-launch literature, total on-the-road price for the "F2 Evolution" was £19,299 (as of June 1999).

=== RD2 (1999–2001) ===
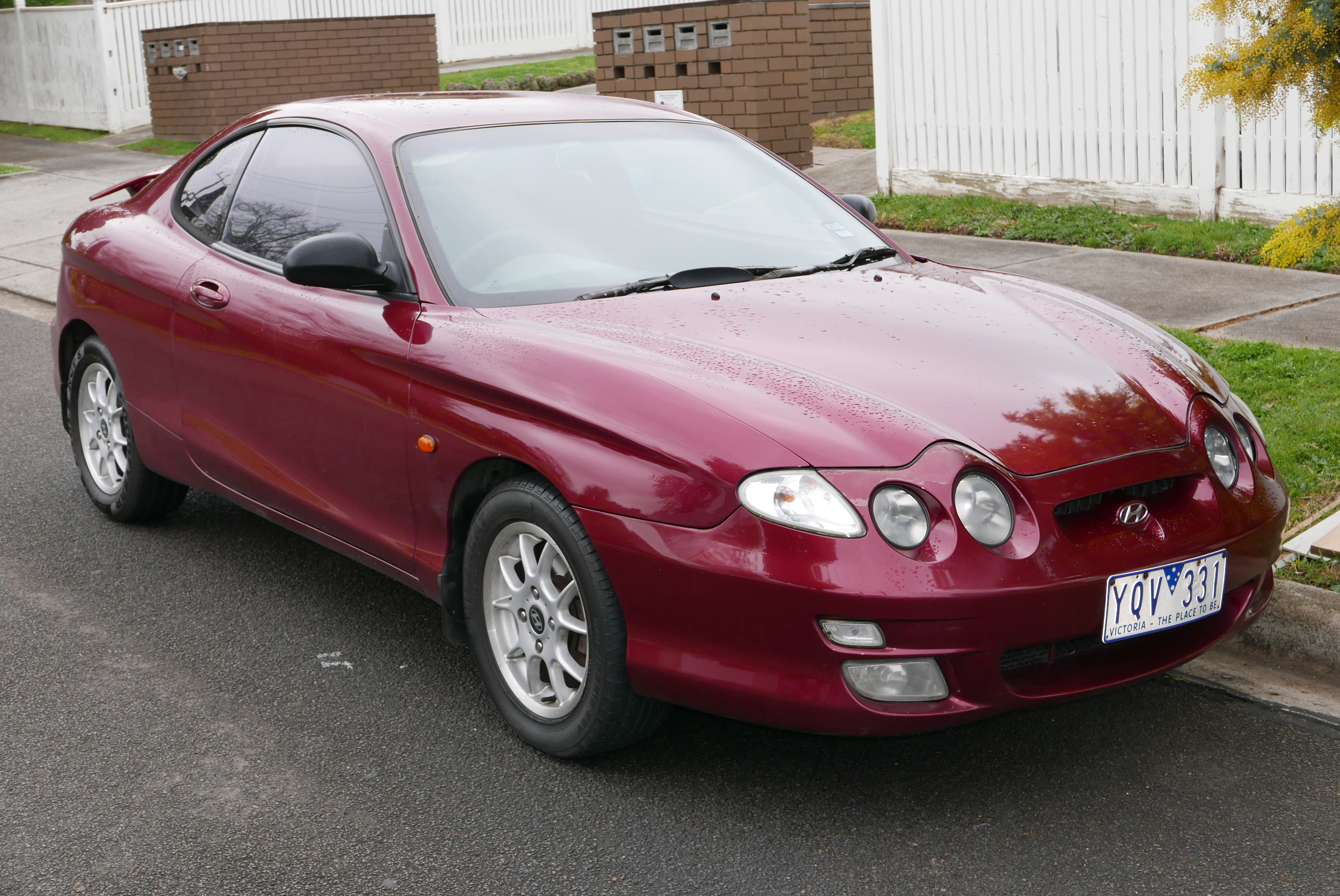
Hyundai Coupe (RD2)

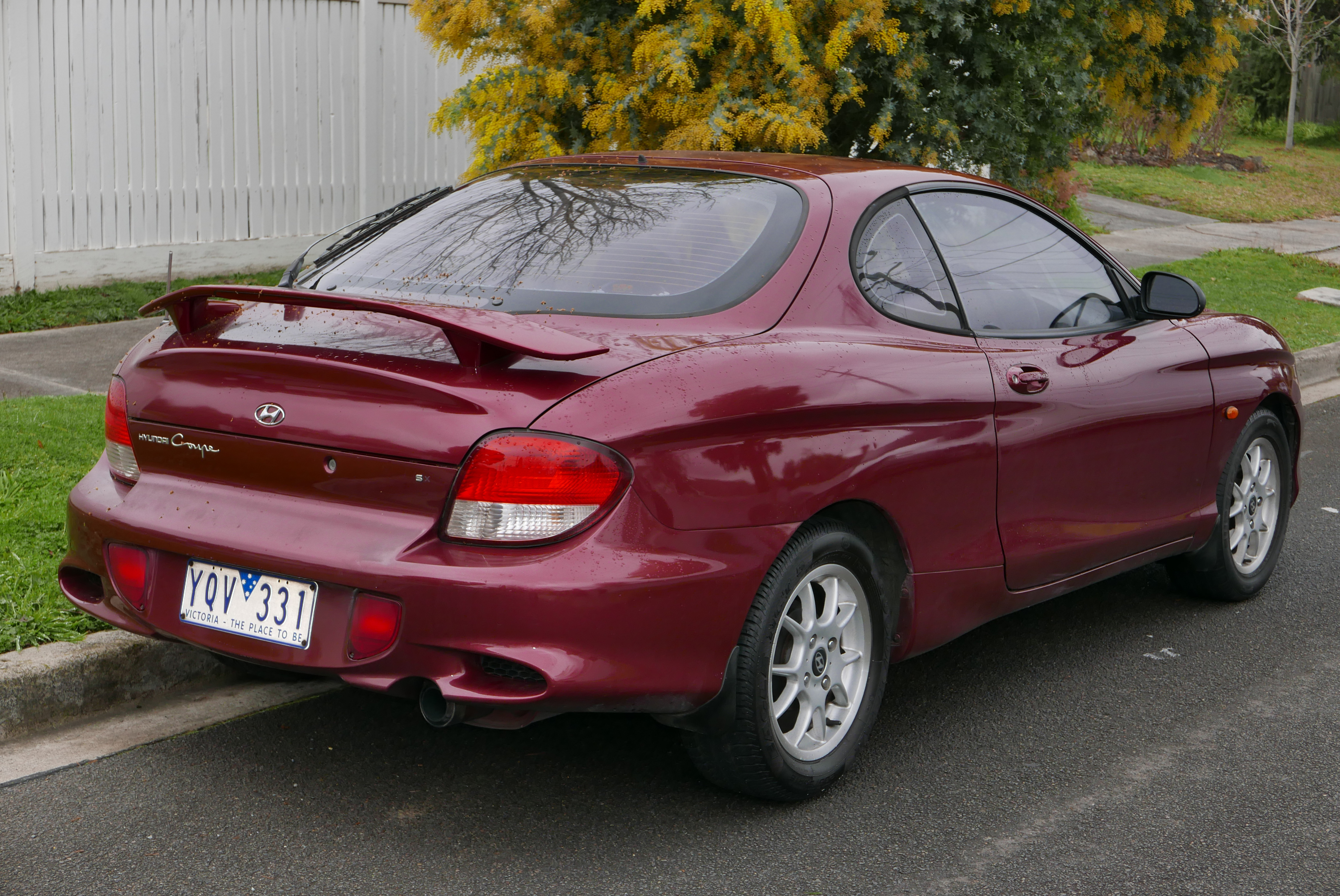
Hyundai Coupe (RD2)

The RD2 Tiburon is an update on the original RD platform and was released for sale in 1999. The RD2 received a facelift that altered the front and rear bumpers and also provided a refreshed interior dash. In South Korea, the RD2 Tiburon was marketed as the "Tiburon Turbulence".

The RD2 headlights have separate enclosures for the high and low beams giving the four headlight look, similar to the third generation Honda/Acura Integra and the sixth generation Toyota Celica. The rear bumper is also reformed receiving larger taillights. The same 140 hp (104 kW) 2.0L engine was carried over producing identical performance. ABS, leather seats, and a sunroof were available in a package.

=== Engineering ===
- 1.6 L inline-4-cylinder DOHC Beta

111 hp (83 kW; 113 PS) at 5,800 rpm and 143 Nm (106 lb·ft) torque at 4,500 rpm.

- 1.8 L inline 4-cylinder Beta (1997 Base)

130 hp (97 kW; 132 PS) at 6,000 rpm and 171 Nm (122 lb·ft) torque at 5,000 rpm.

- 2.0 L inline 4-cylinder Beta 1 (1997 FX, 1998–2001)

140 hp (104 kW; 142 PS) at 6,000 rpm and 180 Nm (133 lb·ft) torque at 4,800 rpm.

From 1997 to 1999 The Tiburon was offered with a 5-speed manual transmission standard, while a 4-speed automatic w/ overdrive was optional.

=== Performance ===
- 1.6-litre:

Acceleration 0–60 mph: 10.8 seconds Top speed: 115 mph (185 km/h) (Auto) 120 mph (193 km/h) (Manual)

- 1.8-litre:

Acceleration 0–60 mph: 9.0 seconds Top speed: 126 mph (203 km/h)

- 2.0-litre:

Acceleration 0–60 mph: 8.3 seconds Top Speed: 126 mph (203 km/h) (Auto) 131 mph (211 km/h) (Manual)

== Second generation (GK; 2001) ==
Second generation
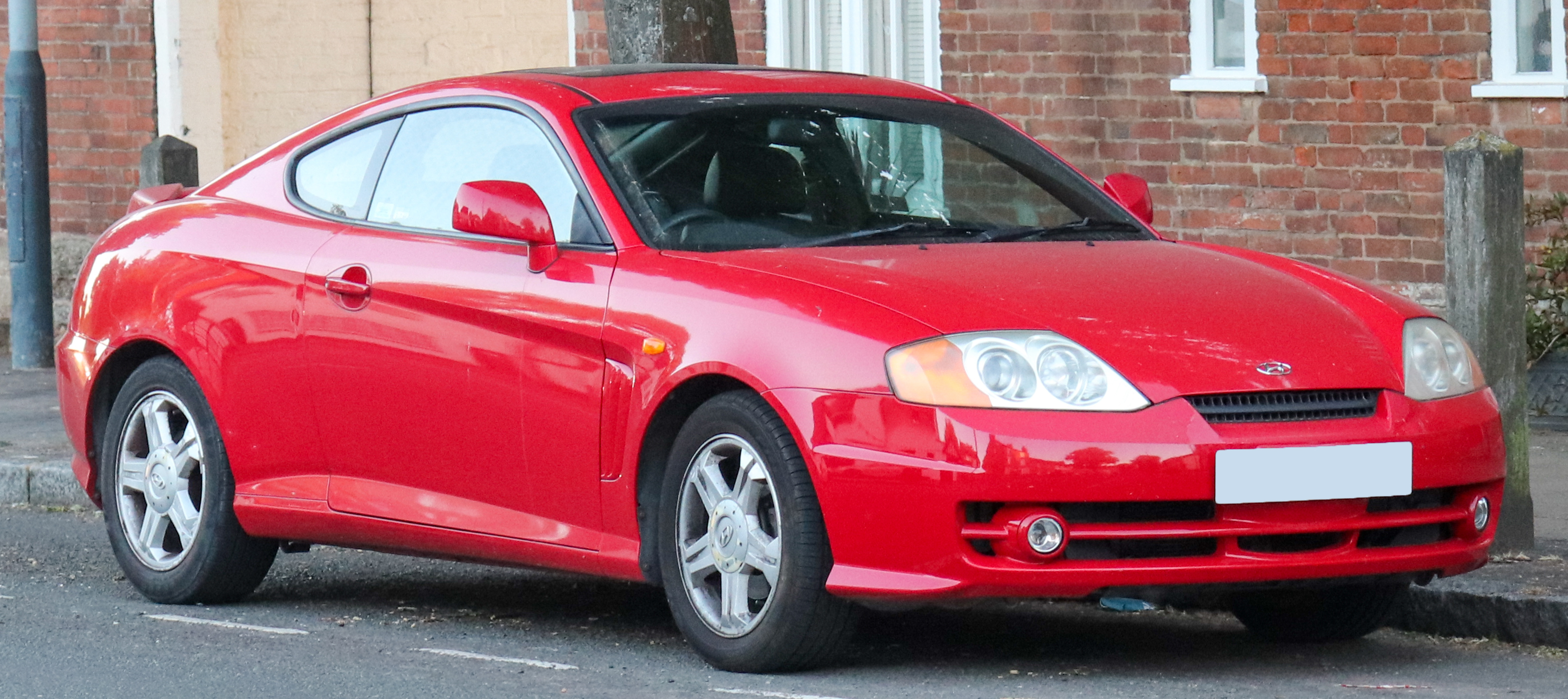

Overview
- Model code: GK
- Also called: Hyundai Tuscani (South Korea); Hyundai Coupe SIII (2nd facelift)
- Production: 2001–2008
- Model years: 2001–2009 (South Korea); 2002–2009 (Europe and Middle East); 2003–2008 (U.S.)
- Assembly: South Korea: Ulsan; Turkey: İzmit, Kocaeli Province (Hyundai Assan); Thailand: Samut Prakan (Thonburi) (TAAP)
- Designer: Pininfarina

Body and chassis
- Related: Hyundai Avante/Elantra (XD); Hyundai Lavita/Matrix; Hyundai Tucson (JM); Kia Cerato/Spectra (LD); Kia Sportage (JE/KM)

Powertrain
- Engine: 1.6 L Alpha II CVVT I4; 2.0 L Beta II CVVT I4; 2.7 L Delta DOHC MPi V6
- Transmission: 5-speed manual; 6-speed manual; 4-speed Mitsubishi INVECS II (F4A42 series) automatic

Dimensions
- Wheelbase: 2,530 mm (99.6 in)
- Length: 4,395 mm (173.0 in)
- Width: 1,760 mm (69.3 in)
- Height: 1,330 mm (52.4 in)
- Curb weight: 1,233 kg (2,718 lb) (1.6L); 1,280–1,357 kg (2,822–2,992 lb) (2.0L); 1,341–1,395 kg (2,956–3,075 lb) (2.7L)

The previous-generation Tiburon was discontinued in 2001 after five years in production. Hyundai launched a revised Tiburon in 2002 for the 2003 model year, giving it new styling, larger dimensions, and an optional V6 engine. Tiburon's wheelbase and overall length grew slightly compared to the previous version, increasing curb weight by about 200 lb (91 kg). In the US, base and GT V6 models were offered with standard front side airbags and optional anti-lock brakes. Base Tiburons retained the 138 hp (103 kW) 2.0-liter four-cylinder engine, while GT V6 coupes got the new 2.7-liter 172 hp (128 kW) V6 from Hyundai's Sonata and Santa Fe. A five-speed manual transmission was standard, and a four-speed automatic was optional. The automatic unit had a manual shift gate. Also optional on the GT V6 was a six-speed manual gearbox. Base models and GT V6 automatics rode on 16-inch tires, versus 17-inch for the GT V6 manual models. Both had standard four-wheel disc brakes. Leather upholstery was standard in the GT V6, as well as a rear spoiler (high spoiler std. on 6-speed only). Aluminium pedals and a sunroof were optional.

In 2004, all GT V6s received 17" wheels. A "special edition" of the GT V6 was also released. It featured a "Special Edition" decal-style badge underneath "Tiburon", sport cloth upholstery, a Kenwood stereo, red painted front brake calipers, and multigauges above the radio. Only the 6-speed and automatic transmissions were available. The special edition was available in Jet Black, Rally Red, and Sunburst Yellow only. The new design received praise from a number of automotive journalists, some of which compared it to the Ferrari 456.

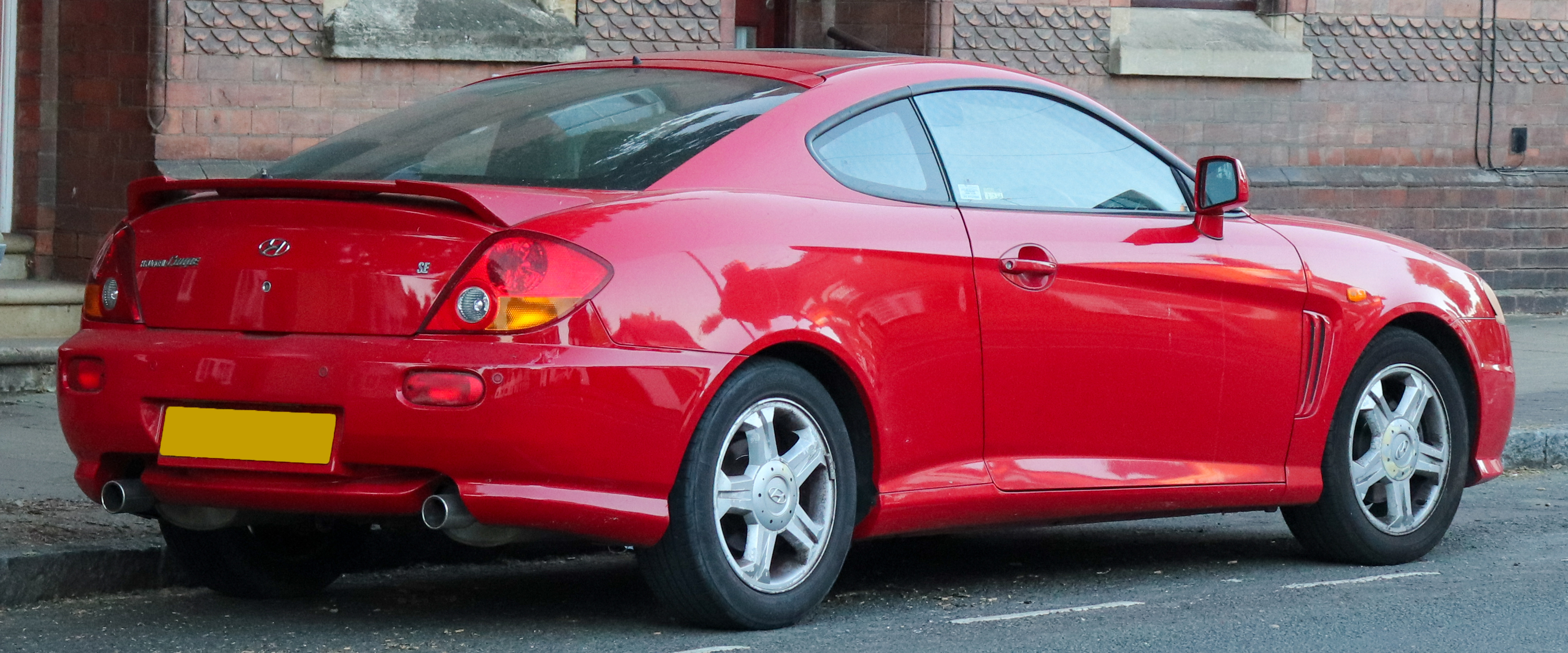
2004 Hyundai Coupé SE (GK)

In 2005 Hyundai facelifted the Tiburon and reshuffled the model lineup; offering GS, GT, and SE models. The SE was now a separate trim from the GT models. Hyundai's four-cylinder engine went into the GS, while the other two held the 2.7-liter V6. A five-speed manual transmission was standard. A four-speed automatic with a manual shift was optional for GS and GT models, but the SE had exclusive use of a six-speed manual gearbox. Anti-lock brakes was standard on the SE and optional for the GT coupe, which could be equipped with leather upholstery. GS coupes rode on 16-inch wheels, versus 17-inch for other models. All-disc brakes and front side airbags were standard. Anti-lock brakes were made standard on all 2006 model Tiburons. In the USA, the rear wiper was removed as a standard feature for the 2005 and 2006 models, although it could be purchased as an optional extra.

In the UK, three models were available before and after the 2005 facelift: the 1.6S, 2.0SE and V6. The 1.6S had a single exhaust and leather seats were optional, although following the 2005 facelift half-leather seats were standard. Both other models have twin exhausts and leather seats as standard. The six-speed gearbox was also standard on the V6 model.

In Greece (S145 model), due to high taxation in hi-displacement engines, a 1.6-liter turbocharged engine was available for some years, producing 145 PS(107 kW) at 5,800 rpm and 190 Nm (128 lbf) of torque at 4,300 rpm and making the 1233 kg vehicle capable of accelerating from 0–100 km/h (0–62 mph) in 9.3 seconds and achieving a top speed of 210 km/h (131 mph). Fuel consumption was 6.4L/100 km (36.8 mpg).

=== GK F/L (2004–2006) ===
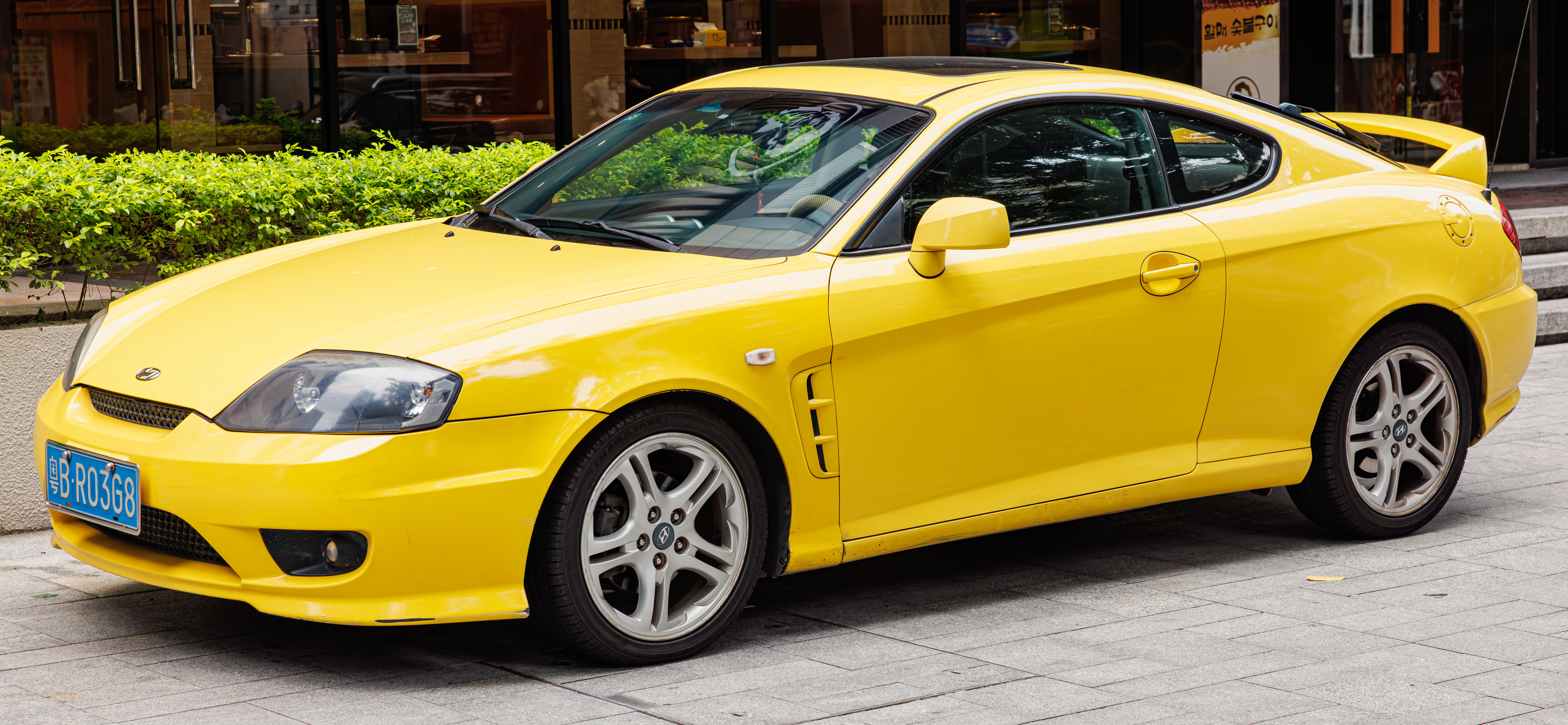

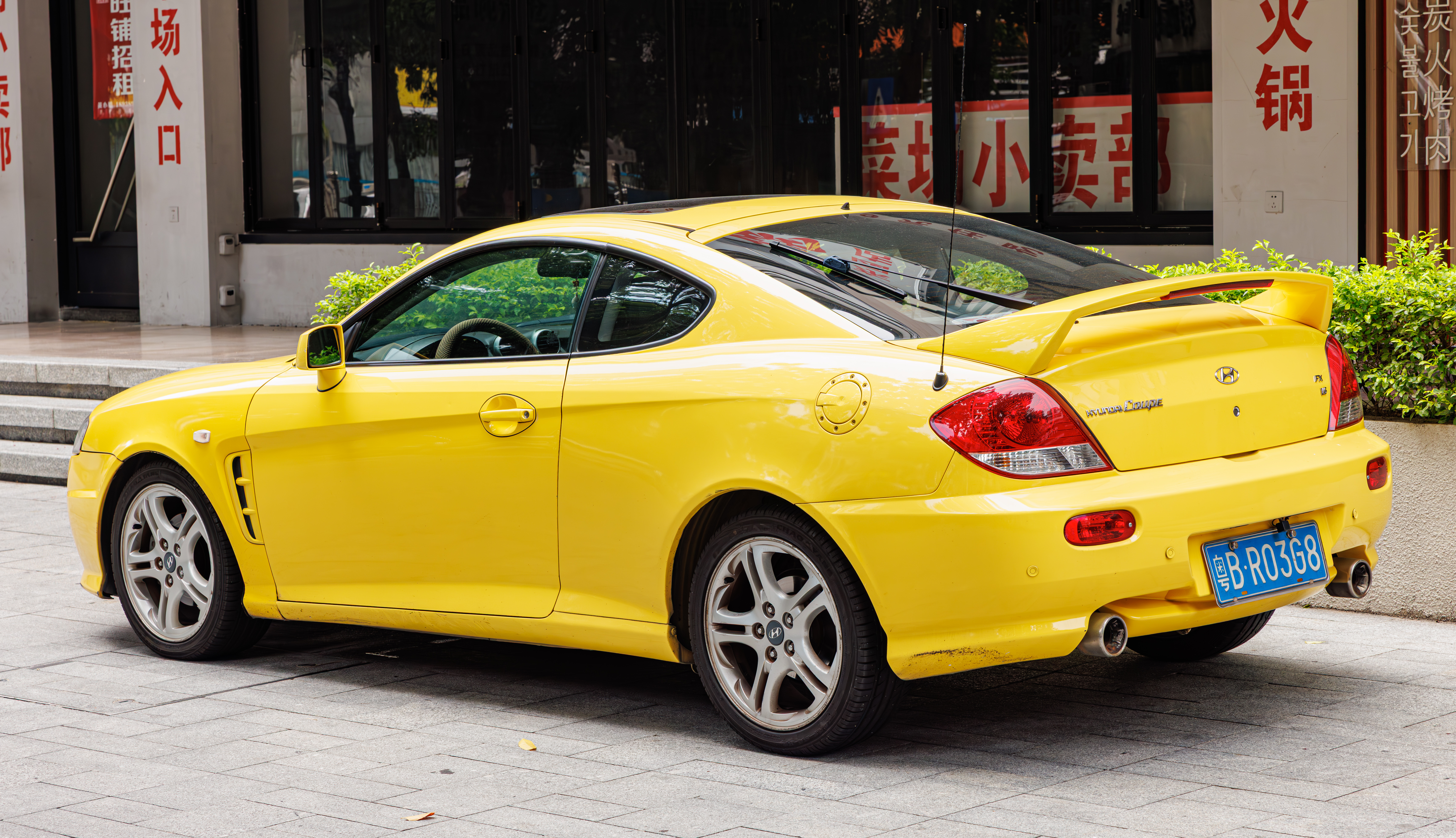
First facelift Hyundai Tiburon/Coupé

Hyundai conducted minor tweaks to the 'GK' model in September 2004 for the 2005 model year. The vehicle incorporated reworked sleeker blackened "smoked" headlights, redesigned rear tail lights, more aggressive front air dam, a different range of alloy wheel designs, colored stitching on leather seats (half leather seats available for the 1.6 range). In 2006, Hyundai released the GT Limited Model. This was an upgrade from the GT V6. It included an upgraded tan leather interior, automatic climate controls, a 440w Infinity 6-disc in dash stereo with 10" subwoofer, an upgraded gauge cluster, and side markers. The GT LTD came in black, Blue, and midnight blue.

=== TS (2005–2006) Australian limited editions ===
In Australia, a limited edition TS was released in October 2005. It had a unique "tiger orange" color paintjob (a color that was not available for any other model) and an extra high rear spoiler. The TS also sported stiffer suspension dampening and a slightly thicker (22mm) rear sway bar. Black leather trim with red stitching, sunroof and other extras were included as standard. The name TS stands for "Tiger Shark", referring to its exclusive orange color and the shark origins of the Tiburon name.

Only 80 of these 2005 TS models were released. Each had an individually numbered ID plate inside the driver's door frame. Number 1 had a manual transmission, and number 80 had an automatic transmission.

A limited edition TS of the 2006 model was also released in 2006. It was available in a unique "vivid blue" paintjob. Only 62 of these were released. These also had a plaque inside the drivers side door, however, this didn't list the build number unlike the 2005 edition.

The TS came standard with the 2.7 litre V6 engine paired to the 6 speed manual transmission.

=== GK F/L2 (2006–2008) ===
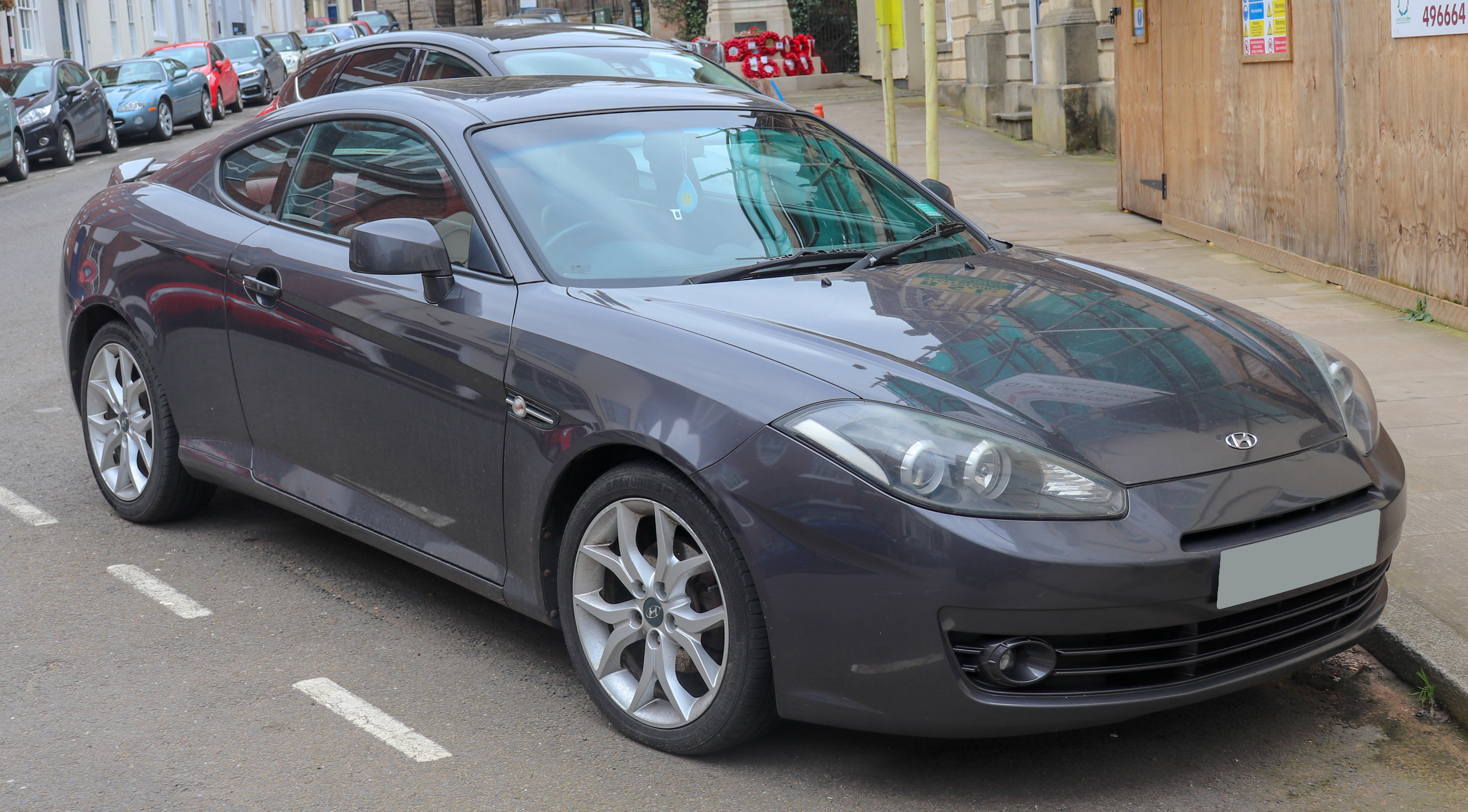

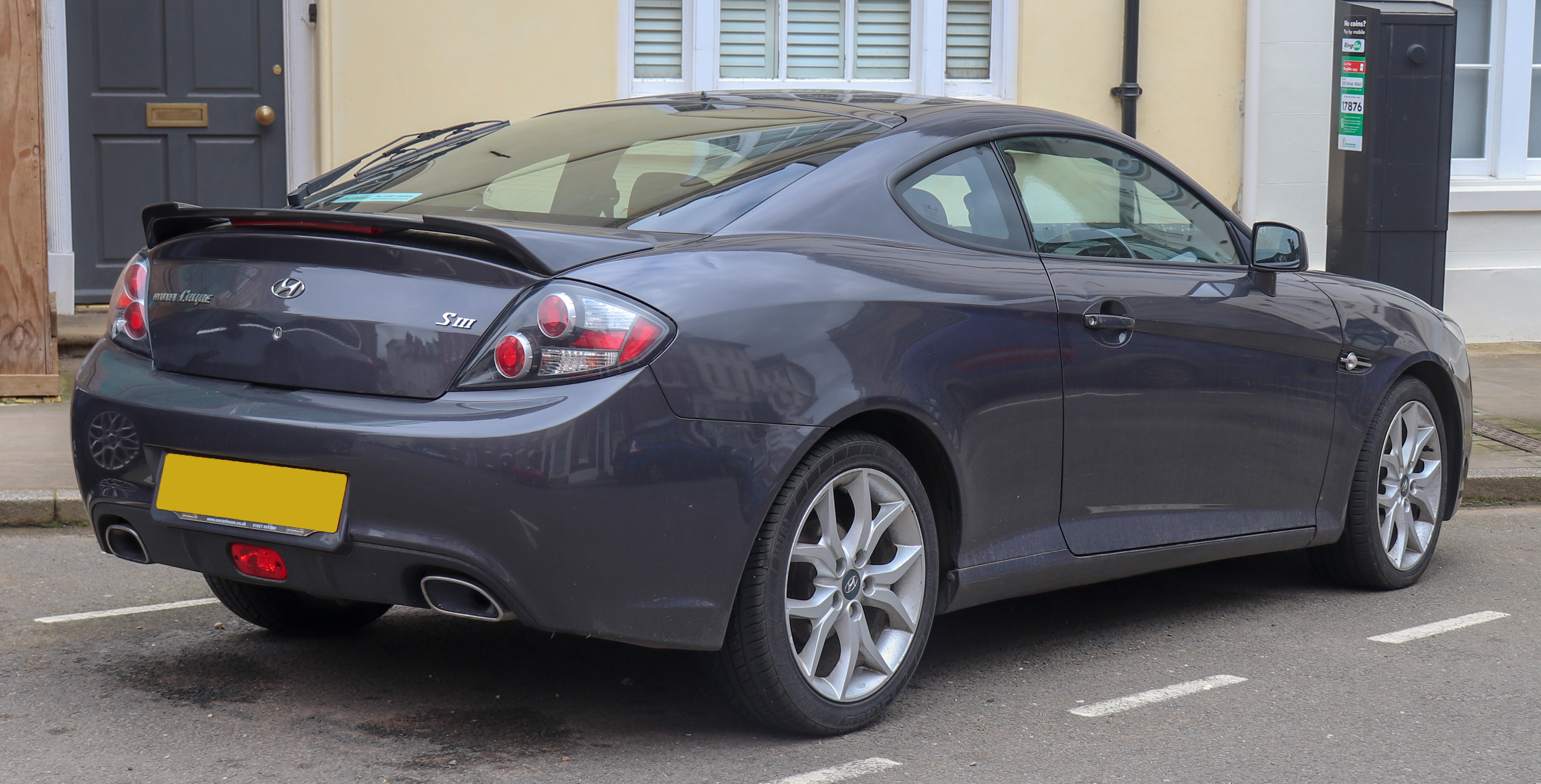
Second facelift Hyundai Tiburon/Coupé

A more comprehensive facelift was launched in November 2006 for the 2007 model year, named the Coupe SIII in markets such as the UK, this time altering the appearance of the car enough to designate it the fourth generation or GK F/L2 reminiscent of the RD1 and RD2 denotations.

The headlights are thinner and angled more aggressively; somewhat similar to the original Tiburon headlights with more straight/sharp lines. The tail lights are similar to the RD2 and GK1 but are somewhat smaller and reflect an aftermarket styling. The fenders lose the tall "gill fins" and a smaller gill insert is present instead. The radio antenna on the F/L2 is integrated into the rear hatch glass rather than being a separate mast, and the interiors received an updated blue backlight scheme for gauges and instrumentation.

On SE models (US), the interior is updated with brushed aluminium accents. The SE trim (US) was also equipped with larger 12 inch front brake rotors and a slightly stiffer suspension.

Hyundai later introduced the limited edition TSIII (UK). This edition included, in addition to the enhancements found on the SE model (US), a quilted leather interior with embroidered logos, quad exhaust exit pipes, and an anthracite finish to the 17" alloy wheels. The performance of the TSIII remained the same as the SIII. This is the last model made.

=== Equipment and safety ===
The exact specification depends on model and the region where it was sold but these are some of the features available:

- Anti-lock brakes, dual circuit with brake force distribution
- Front (variable rate) airbags and side airbags
- Side impact protection bars
- ESP (2007)
- Traction control
- Electric windows and sunroof
- Heated front seats
- Trip computer
- Air conditioning / climate control
- Leather / half-leather / cloth interior
- Sports seats
- Alloy wheels (16" or 17")
- CD player with cassette and radio
- Additional gauges featuring torque, real-time fuel consumption and battery voltage

The 2004–2007 models received a 4/5 star rating from the National Highway Traffic Safety Administration in the USA.

=== Powertrain ===
Engine	Production	Transmission	Power	Torque	Acceleration 0–100 km/h (0–62 mph)	Top Speed
1.6L Alpha II	2001–2006	5-speed manual	105 PS (77 kW; 104 hp) @ 5,800 rpm	14.6 kg⋅m (143 N⋅m; 106 lbf⋅ft) @ 4,500 rpm	11.6 s	185 km/h (115 mph)
2.0L Beta II	2001–2003	5-speed manual	138 PS (101 kW; 136 hp) @ 6,000 rpm	18.5 kg⋅m (181 N⋅m; 134 lbf⋅ft) @ 4,500 rpm	9.2 s	206 km/h (128 mph)
2.0L Beta II	2001–2003	4-speed automatic	138 PS (101 kW; 136 hp) @ 6,000 rpm	18.5 kg⋅m (181 N⋅m; 134 lbf⋅ft) @ 4,500 rpm	10.5 s	198 km/h (123 mph)
2.0L Beta II	2004–2008	5-speed manual	143 PS (105 kW; 141 hp) @ 6,000 rpm	19 kg⋅m (186 N⋅m; 137 lbf⋅ft) @ 4,500 rpm	9.1 s	208 km/h (129 mph)
2.0L Beta II	2004–2008	4-speed automatic	143 PS (105 kW; 141 hp) @ 6,000 rpm	19 kg⋅m (186 N⋅m; 137 lbf⋅ft) @ 4,500 rpm	10.4 s	200 km/h (124 mph)
2.7L Delta	2001–2008	5-speed manual 6-speed manual	167–174 PS (123–128 kW; 165–172 hp) @ 6,000 rpm	25 kg⋅m (245 N⋅m; 181 lbf⋅ft) @ 4,000 rpm	8.2 s	220 km/h (137 mph)
2.7L Delta	2001–2008	4-speed automatic	167–174 PS (123–128 kW; 165–172 hp) @ 6,000 rpm	25 kg⋅m (245 N⋅m; 181 lbf⋅ft) @ 4,000 rpm	8.5 s	218 km/h (135 mph)

In the US, the 5-speed retained standard on the GS, GT, and GT Limited, while the upscale SE model came only with a six-speed manual and the 2.7L V6 engine. A four-speed automatic transmission with Shiftronic was available for all models except the SE.

In the UK and Middle East, the 5-speed manual is standard on the 1.6L and 2.0L versions, while a 6-speed is standard on the top of line 2.7L FX model, A four-speed automatic transmission with Shiftronic was available for 2.0L & 2.7L as well.

=== Performance ===
Magazines road test performance of the car:-

- 2.7-litre: (5-speed)
  - Acceleration 0–60 mph (97 km/h)
    - Car and Driver: 7.6 seconds
  - Acceleration 0–100 mph (161 km/h)
    - Car and Driver: 20.9 seconds
  - 1/4 Mile
    - 15.7 seconds at 88 mph (142 km/h)
  - Top speed:
    - Car and Driver: 136 mph (219 km/h)
- 2.7-litre: (6-speed)
  - Acceleration 0–60 mph (97 km/h)
    - Motor Trend: 7.0 seconds
    - Car and Driver: 7.1 seconds
    - MotorWeek: 7.1 seconds
    - Road & Track: 7.2 seconds (2007)
    - Road & Track: 7.6 seconds (2003)
  - Acceleration 0–100 mph (161 km/h)
    - Road & Track: 19.3 seconds (2007)
    - Car and Driver: 20.6 seconds
    - Road & Track: 21 seconds (2003)
  - 1/4 Mile
    - MotorWeek: 15.4 seconds at 91 mph (146 km/h)
    - Road & Track: 15.4 seconds at 90.4 mph (145 km/h)
    - Car and Driver: 15.6 seconds at 90 mph (145 km/h)
    - Road & Track: 15.9 seconds at 87.6 mph (141 km/h)
  - Top speed:
    - Road & Track: 137 mph (220 km/h) (2007)
    - Road & Track: 137 mph (220 km/h) (2003)
    - Car and Driver: 132 mph (212 km/h)

== Marketing and branding ==
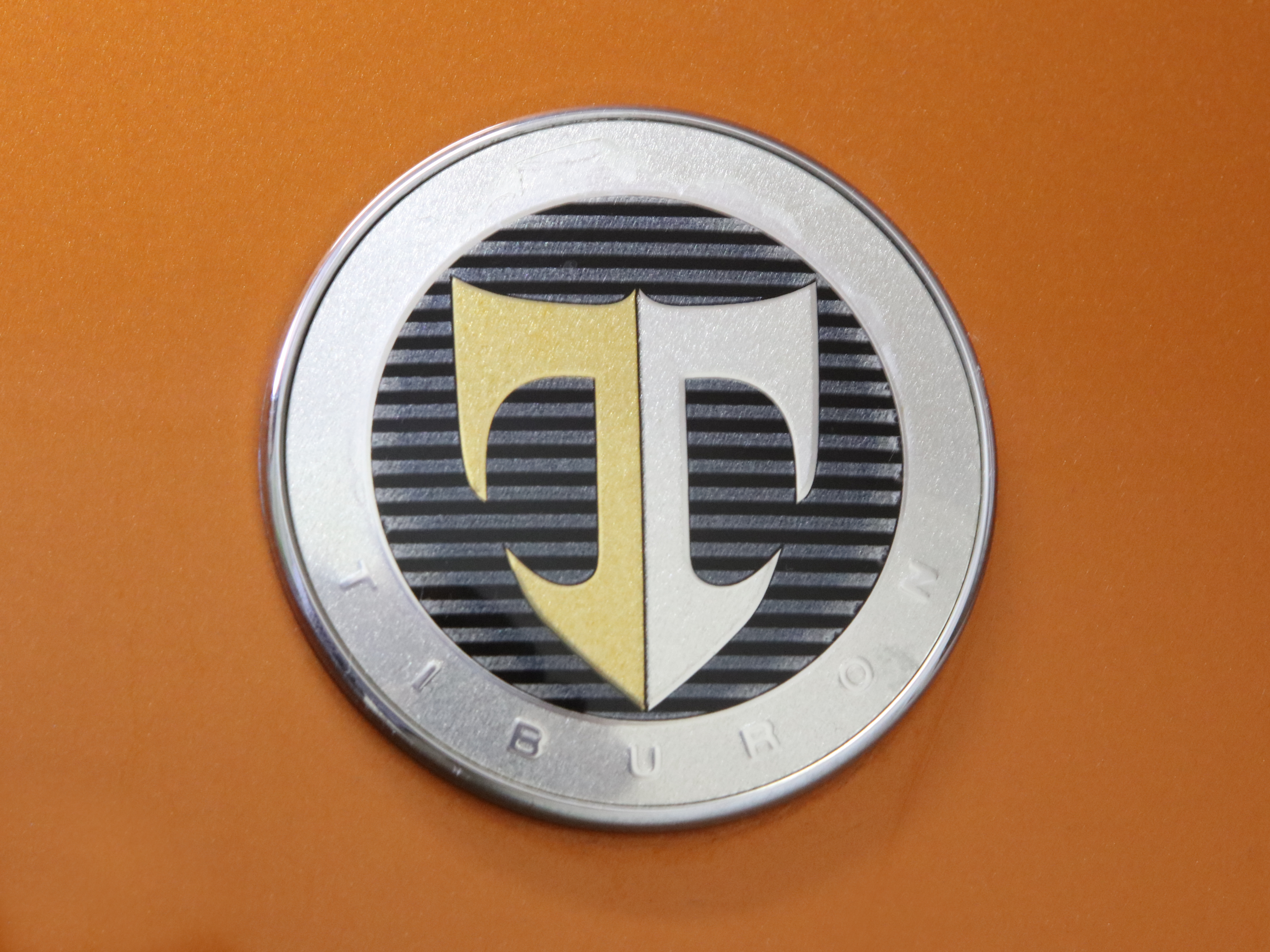
Tiburon badge

The car is branded as the Hyundai Coupe in some European markets and the Middle East.

In some markets the model is sold and branded as a Tuscani. For example, in South Korea, the Tuscani wears a circular badge containing a smaller circle of black and grey horizontal bars which is overlaid with a letter 'T' painted gold on the left and silver on the right. Even in markets where the car is sold as a Hyundai Tiburon or Hyundai Coupe, many by owners have been rebadged their vehicles with Tuscani emblems, so it is not unusual to find the GK with different badges than what Hyundai offered in those regions. In Canada, a special edition of the Tiburon is sold as a "Tuscani edition". There was an unconfirmed rumour that Hyundai had considered a plan to branch off the Tuscani name as a complete sub brand for more exclusive, sporty, and upmarket models. The existence of the name is most likely to achieve greater sales where the Hyundai name has cloying associations with more budget products.

In some markets, the badge was used with the Tiburon name. For example, the photo of the badge is from the front an Australian 2005 model Tiburon TS, which used the badge on the front and rear exterior with the Hyundai logo on the steering wheel.

In some markets secondary badging may denote engine size and variations such as trim, wheel, and other options. These badges include GS, GT, SE and FX, although some use FX across the entire range. In certain markets, certain exterior colors are not available and identification may require noticing subtle local differences such as alloy wheels, spoilers or dealer fit options such as in car entertainment systems. These can all change from year to year and from market to market, so the variation is quite significant. One notable difference is that the 1.6 engine always has a single exhaust on the right hand side, in all markets where it is sold.

== Sales ==
Year	South Korea	U.S.	Global
1996		341	
1997		9,391	
1998		8,341	
1999		9,641	
2000		15,237	
2001	7,095	19,176	33,643
2002	9,146	19,963	72,413
2003	4,039	21,242	39,830
2004	2,019	20,125	43,523
2005	1,851	20,600	42,299
2006	1,861	17,382	30,823
2007	2,534	14,073	33,481
2008	886	9,111	22,120
2009	0	8,587	

== See also ==
- Hyundai Genesis Coupe, a rear wheel drive Hyundai sports car
