= Shiftronic =

Shiftronic is Hyundai Motor Company's version of the manumatic automatic transmission. A Shiftronic transmission can operate just like a conventional automatic transmission, but it also allows the driver to override the computer's automatic mode by moving the shift lever into a second shift gate equipped with two spring-loaded positions: "upshift" and "downshift". Once in this gate, the driver takes over most of the shifting decisions ordinarily performed by the transmission's computer, permitting, for example, the delaying of an upshift for increased acceleration or to increase the braking effect of the engine. A Shiftronic transmission utilizes a torque converter; consequently, it is not a standard transmission, single-clutch AMT, or a newer dual-clutch transmission like Volkswagen's Direct-Shift Gearbox. In overridden mode, however, a Shiftronic transmission does not allow the engine to stall or over-rev.

== See also ==
- List of Hyundai transmissions
