= Mass flow sensor =

Internal combustion engine sensor

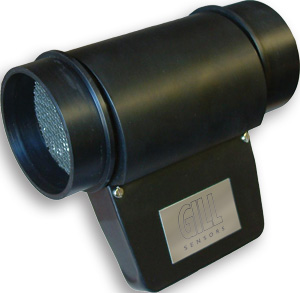
A mass airflow sensor

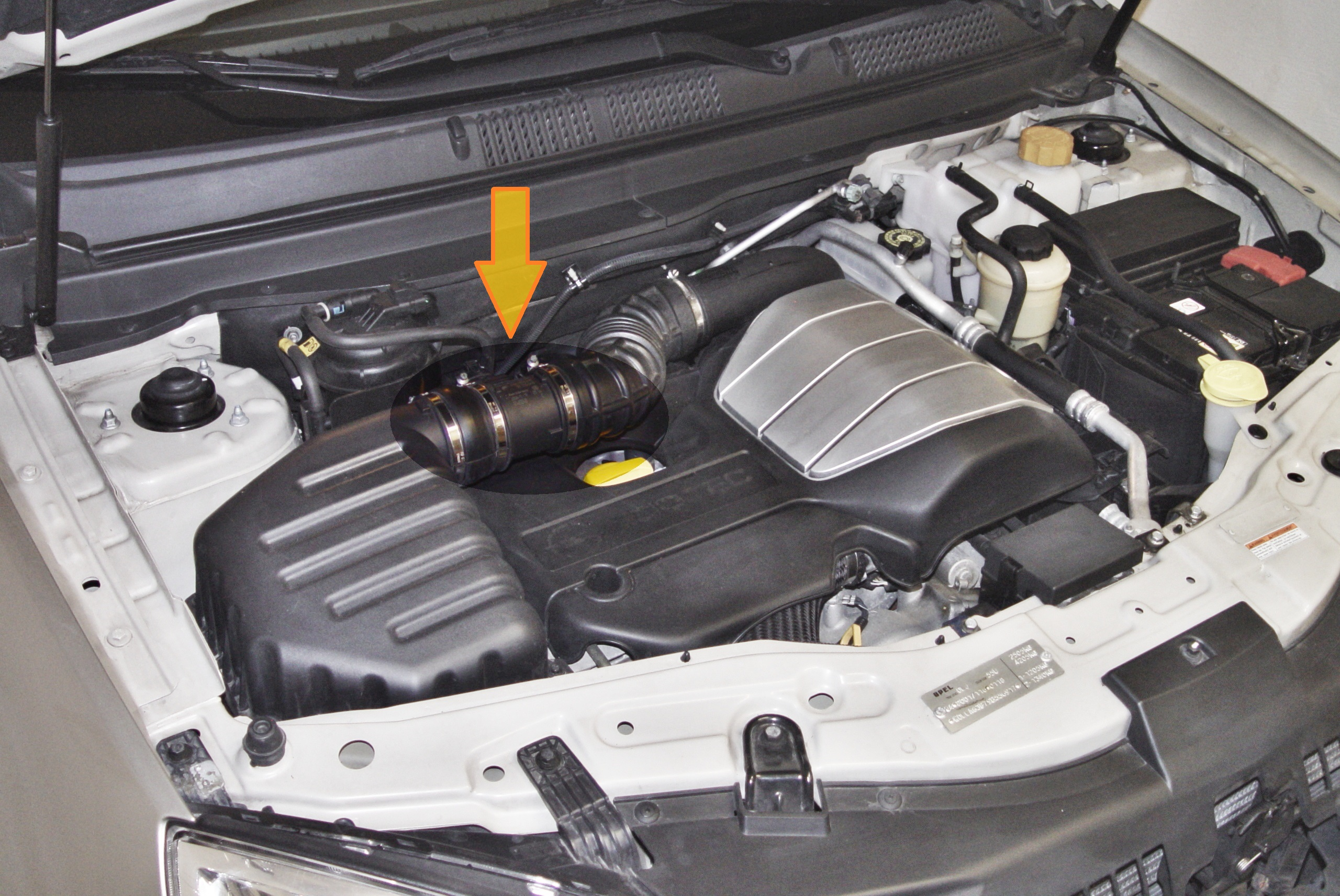
MAF sensor location in an automotive diesel engine

A mass (air) flow sensor (MAF) is a sensor used to determine the mass flow rate of air entering a fuel-injected internal combustion engine.

The air mass information is necessary for the engine control unit (ECU) to balance and deliver the correct fuel mass to the engine. Air changes its density with temperature and pressure. In automotive applications, air density varies with the ambient temperature, altitude and the use of forced induction, which means that mass flow sensors are more appropriate than volumetric flow sensors for determining the quantity of intake air in each cylinder.

There are two common types of mass airflow sensors in use on automotive engines: vane meter sensors and hot wire sensors. Neither design employs technology that measures air mass directly. However, with additional sensors and inputs, an engine's ECU can determine the mass flow rate of intake air. Both approaches are used almost exclusively on electronic fuel injection (EFI) engines. Both sensor designs output a 0.0–5.0 volt or a pulse-width modulation (PWM) signal that is proportional to the air mass flow rate, and both sensors have an intake air temperature (IAT) sensor incorporated into their housings for most post on-board diagnostics (OBDII) vehicles. Vehicles prior to 1996 could have MAF without an IAT. An example is 1994 Infiniti Q45.

When a MAF sensor is used in conjunction with an oxygen sensor, the engine's air/fuel ratio can be controlled very accurately. The MAF sensor provides the open-loop controller predicted air flow information (the measured air flow) to the ECU, and the oxygen sensor provides closed-loop feedback in order to make minor corrections to the predicted air mass. Also see manifold absolute pressure sensor (MAP sensor). Since around 2012, some MAF sensors include a humidity sensor.

== Moving vane meter ==
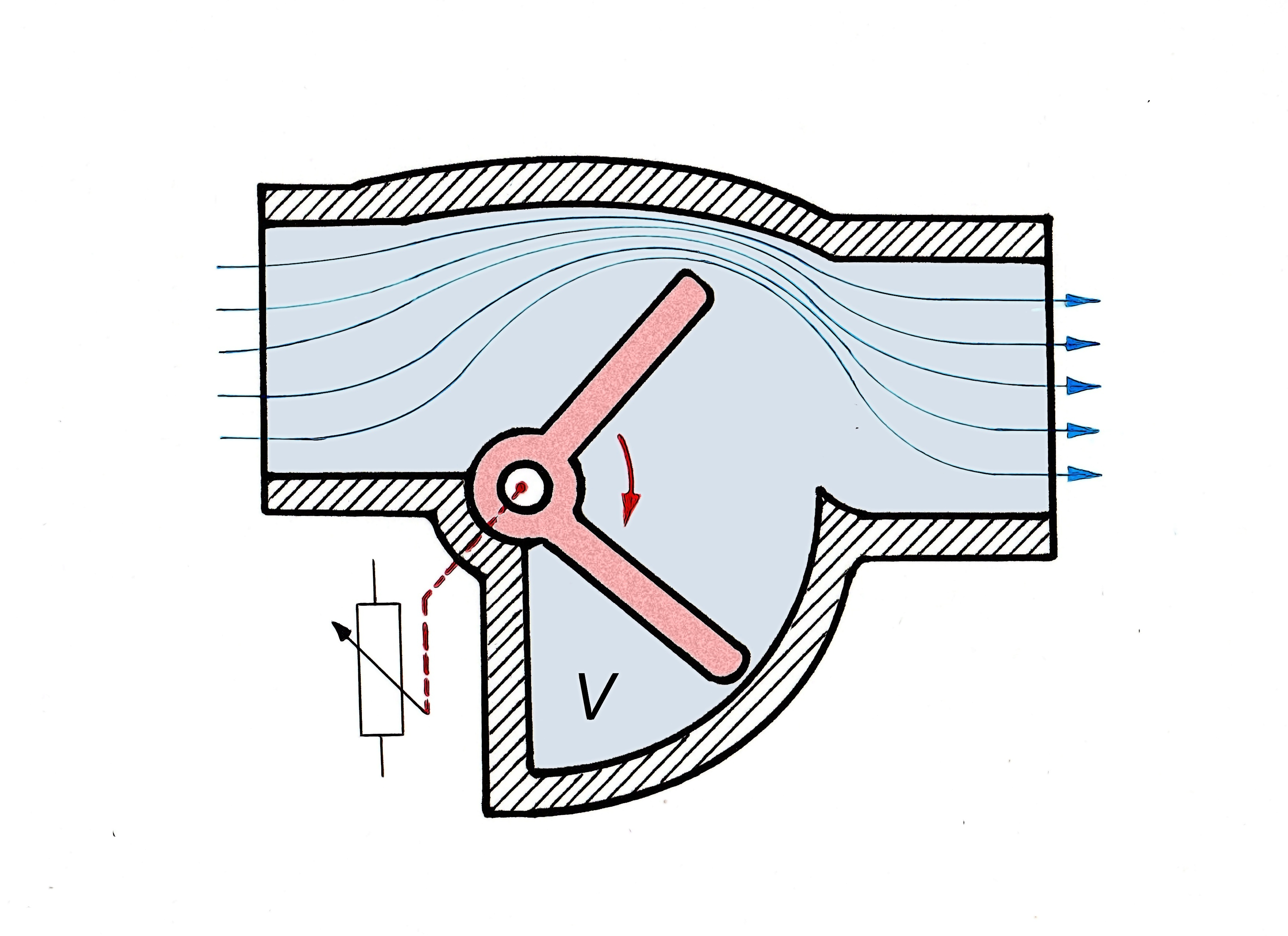
Intake-air flap type flowmeter

The VAF (vane air flow) sensor measures the momentum of the air flow into the engine with a spring-loaded air vane (flap/door) attached to a variable resistor (potentiometer). The vane moves in proportion to the momentum of the airflow. A voltage is applied to the potentiometer and a voltage appears on the output terminal of the potentiometer proportional to the angle the vane rotates, or the movement of the vane may directly regulate the amount of fuel injected, as in the K-Jetronic system.

Many VAF sensors have an air-fuel adjustment screw, which opens or closes a small air passage on the side of the VAF sensor. This screw controls the air-fuel mixture by letting a metered amount of air flow past the air flap, thereby leaning or richening the mixture. By turning the screw clockwise the mixture is enriched and counterclockwise the mixture is leaned.

The vane moves because of the drag force of the air flow against it; it does not measure volume or mass directly. The drag force depends on air density (air density in turn depends on air temperature), air velocity and the shape of the vane, see drag equation. Some VAF sensors include an additional intake air temperature sensor (IAT sensor) to allow the engines ECU to calculate the density of the air, and the fuel delivery accordingly.

The vane meter approach has some drawbacks:

- it restricts airflow which limits engine output
- its moving electrical or mechanical contacts can wear
- finding a suitable mounting location within a confined engine compartment is problematic
- the vane has to be oriented with respect to gravity.
- in some manufacturers fuel pump control was also part on the VAF internal wiring.

== Hot wire sensor (MAF) ==
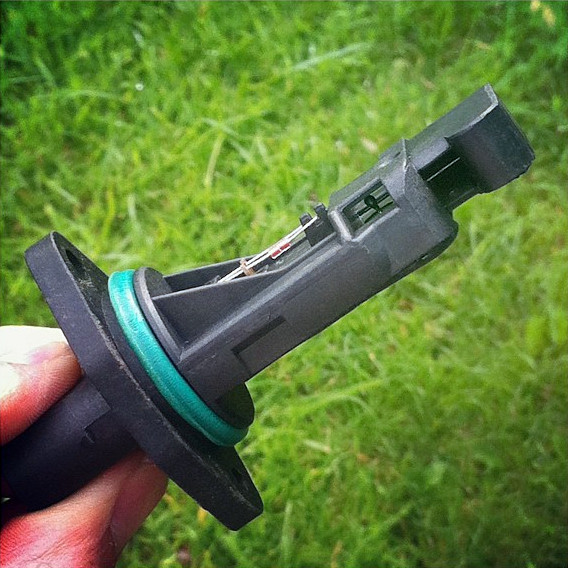
A hot thick film-grid MAF sensor. The intake air temperature sensor is visible outside, the film-grid is inside.

A hot wire mass airflow sensor determines the mass of air flowing into an engine's air intake system. The theory of operation of the hot wire mass airflow sensor is similar to that of the hot wire anemometer (which determines air velocity). This is achieved by heating a wire suspended in the engine's air stream, like a toaster wire, by applying a constant voltage over the wire. The wire's electrical resistance increases as the wire's temperature increases, which varies the electrical current flowing through the circuit, according to Ohm's law. When air flows past the wire, the wire cools, decreasing its resistance, which in turn allows more current to flow through the circuit, since the supply voltage is a constant. As more current flows, the wire's temperature increases until the resistance reaches equilibrium again. The current increase or decrease is proportional to the mass of air flowing past the wire. The integrated electronic circuit converts the proportional measurement into a proportional voltage which is sent to the ECU.

If air density increases due to pressure increase or temperature drop, but the air volume remains constant, the denser air will remove more heat from the wire indicating a higher mass airflow. Unlike the vane meter's paddle sensing element, the hot wire responds directly to air density. This sensor's capabilities are well suited to support the gasoline combustion process which fundamentally responds to air mass, not air volume. (See stoichiometry.)

This sensor sometimes employs a mixture screw, but this screw is fully electronic and uses a variable resistor (potentiometer) instead of an air bypass screw. The screw needs more turns to achieve the desired results. A hot wire burn-off cleaning circuit is employed on some of these sensors. A burn-off relay applies a high current through the platinum hot wire after the vehicle is turned off for a second or so, thereby burning or vaporizing any contaminants that have stuck to the platinum hot wire element.

The hot film MAF sensor works somewhat similar to the hot wire MAF sensor, but instead it usually outputs a frequency signal. This sensor uses a hot film-grid instead of a hot wire. It is commonly found in late 1980s and early 1990s fuel-injected vehicles. The output frequency is directly proportional to the air mass entering the engine. So as mass flow increases so does frequency. These sensors tend to cause intermittent problems due to internal electrical failures. The use of an oscilloscope is strongly recommended to check the output frequency of these sensors. Frequency distortion is also common when the sensor starts to fail. Many technicians in the field use a tap test with very conclusive results. Not all HFM systems output a frequency. In some cases, this sensor works by outputting a regular varying voltage signal.

A micro-bridge uses the same principles but arranged on a silicon chip.

== Coldwire sensor ==
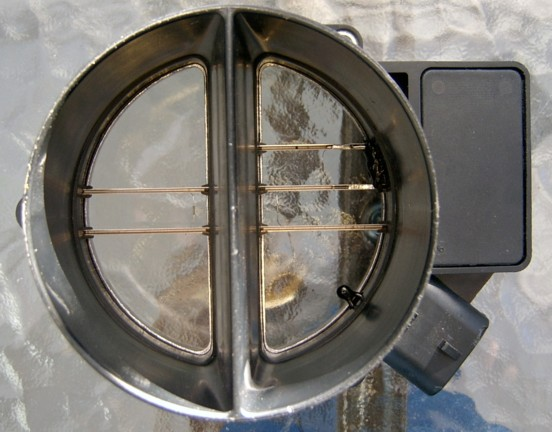
A Holden Commodore's MAF sensor

The GM LS engine series (as well as others) use a coldwire MAF system (produced by AC Delco) that works similarly to the hot-wire MAF system; however, it uses an additional "cold" resistor to measure the ambient air and provide a reference for the "hot" resistor element used to measure the air flow.

The mesh on the MAF is used to smooth out airflow to ensure the sensors have the best chance of a steady reading. It is not used for measuring the air flow per se. In situations where owners use oiled-gauze air filters, it is possible for excess oil to coat the MAF sensor and skew its readings. Indeed, General Motors has issued a Technical Service Bulletin, indicating problems from rough idle all the way to possible transmission damage resulting from the contaminated sensors. To clean the delicate MAF sensor components, a specific MAF sensor cleaner or electronics cleaner should be used, not carburetor or brake cleaners, which can be too aggressive chemically. Instead, the liquid phase of MAF sensor cleaners and electronics cleaners is typically based on hexanes or heptanes with little to no alcohol content and use either carbon dioxide or HFC-152a as aerosol propellants. The sensors should be gently sprayed from a careful distance to avoid physically damaging them and then allowed to thoroughly dry before reinstalling. Manufacturers claim that a simple but extremely reliable test to ensure correct functionality is to tap the unit with the back of a screwdriver while the car is running, and if this causes any changes in the output frequency then the unit should be discarded and an OEM replacement installed.

== Kármán vortex sensor ==
A von Kármán vortex street

A Kármán vortex sensor works by disrupting the air stream with a perpendicular bow. Providing that the incoming flow is laminar, the wake consists of an oscillatory pattern of Kármán vortices. The frequency of the resulting pattern is proportional to the air velocity.

These vortices can either be read directly as a pressure pulse against a sensor, or they can be made to collide with a mirror which will then interrupt or transmit a reflected light beam to generate the pulses in response to the vortices. The first type can only be used in pull-thru air (prior to a turbo- or supercharger), while the second type could theoretically be used push- or pull-thru air (before or after a forced induction application like the previously mentioned super- or turbocharger). Instead of outputting a constant voltage modified by a resistance factor, this type of MAF outputs a frequency which must then be interpreted by the ECU. This type of MAF can be found on all DSMs (Mitsubishi Eclipse, Eagle Talon, Plymouth Laser), many Mitsubishis, some Toyotas and Lexus, and some BMWs, among others.

== Membrane sensor ==
An emerging technology utilizes a very thin electronic membrane placed in the air stream. The membrane has a thin film temperature sensor printed on the upstream side, and one on the downstream side. A heater is integrated in the center of the membrane which maintains a constant temperature similar to the hot-wire approach. Without any airflow, the temperature profile across the membrane is uniform. When air flows across the membrane, the upstream side cools differently from the downstream side. The difference between the upstream and downstream temperature indicates the mass airflow. The thermal membrane sensor is also capable of measuring flow in both directions, which sometimes occur in pulsating situations. Technological progress allows this kind of sensor to be manufactured on the microscopic scale as microsensors using microelectromechanical systems technology. Such a microsensor reaches a significantly higher speed and sensitivity compared with macroscopic approaches. See also MEMS sensor generations.

== Laminar flow elements ==
Laminar flow elements measure the volumetric flow of gases directly. They operate on the principle that, given laminar flow, the pressure difference across a pipe is linearly proportional to the flow rate. Laminar flow conditions are present in a gas when the Reynolds number of the gas is below the critical figure. The viscosity of the fluid must be compensated for in the result. Laminar flow elements are usually constructed from a large number of parallel pipes to achieve the required flow rating.

== See also ==
- List of auto parts
- List of sensors
- Manifold absolute pressure (MAP)
