= MEMS sensor generations =

MEMS sensor generations represent the progress made in micro sensor technology and can be categorized as follows:

1st Generation
MEMS sensor element mostly based on a silicon structure, sometimes combined with analog amplification on a micro chip.

2nd Generation
MEMS sensor element combined with analog amplification and analog-to-digital converter on one micro chip.

3rd Generation
Fusion of the sensor element with analog amplification, analog-to-digital converter and digital intelligence for linearization and temperature compensation on the same micro chip.

4th Generation
Memory cells for calibration- and temperature compensation data are added to the elements of the 3rd MEMS sensor generation.
