= Kia K4 =

Small family car

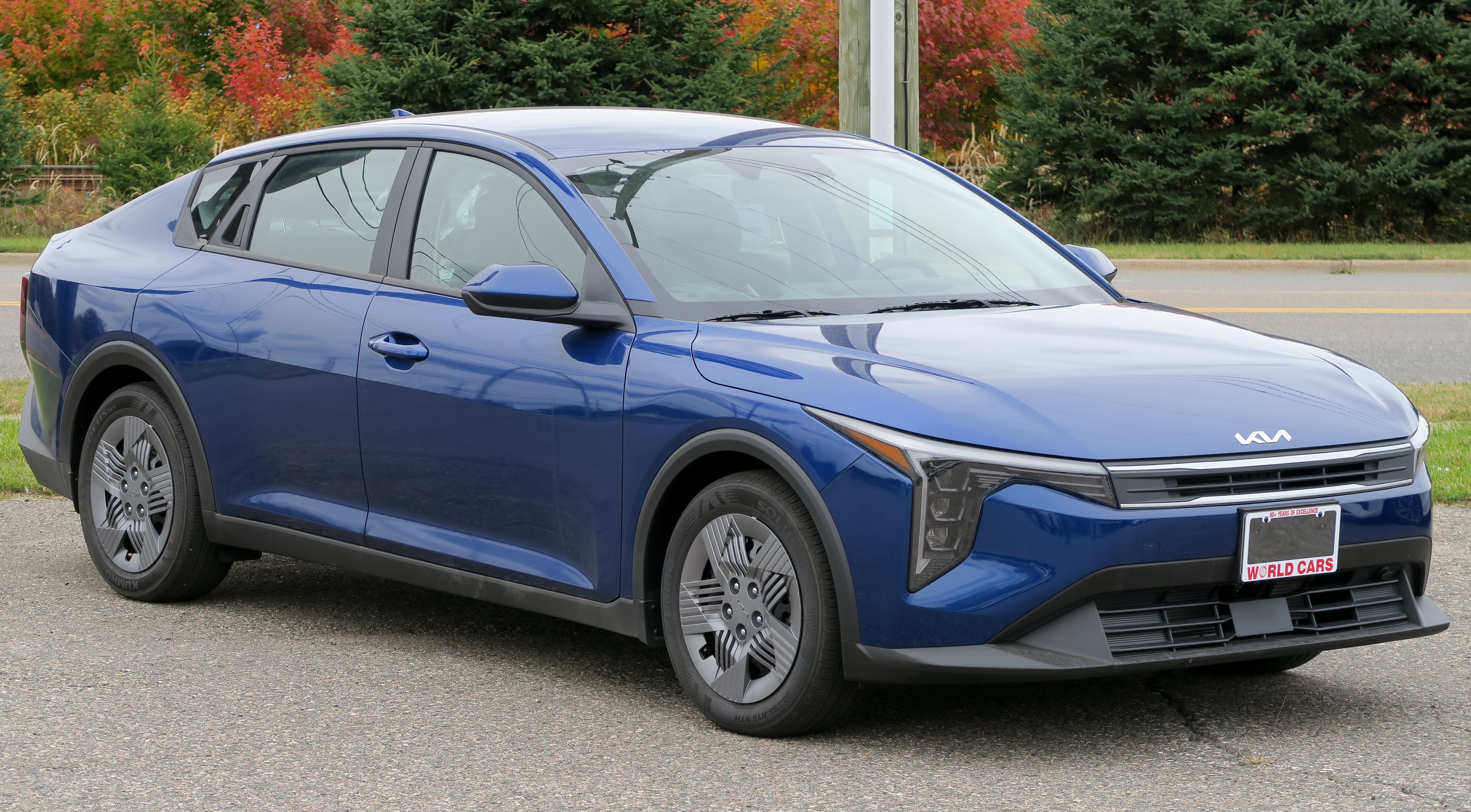
- 2025 Kia K4 LX Sedan (Canada)

Overview
- Manufacturer: Kia
- Model code: CL4
- Production: 2024–present
- Model years: 2025–present
- Assembly: Mexico: Monterrey, Nuevo León (KMMX)

Body and chassis
- Class: Compact car (C)
- Body style: 4-door sedan/saloon; 5-door hatchback; 5-door station wagon/estate (Sportswagon)
- Layout: Front-engine, front-wheel-drive
- Platform: Hyundai-Kia K3
- Related: Hyundai Elantra/Avante (CN7)

Powertrain
- Engine: Petrol: 1.0 L Smartstream G1.0 T-GDi I3; 1.6 L Smartstream G1.6 MPi I4; 1.6 L Smartstream G1.6 T-GDi I4; 2.0 L Smartstream G2.0 MPi I4
- Power output: 84 kW (113 hp; 114 PS) (1.0 T-GDi); 90 kW (121 hp; 122 PS) (1.6 MPi); 142 kW (190 hp; 193 PS) (1.6 T-GDi); 110–133 kW (148–178 hp; 150–181 PS) (1.6 T-GDi, Europe); 112 kW (150 hp; 152 PS) (2.0 MPi)
- Transmission: 6-speed manual; 6-speed automatic; 8-speed automatic; 7-speed DCT; CVT
- Hybrid drivetrain: Mild hybrid

Dimensions
- Wheelbase: 2,720 mm (107.1 in)
- Length: 4,430 mm (174.4 in) (Hatchback); 4,695 mm (184.8 in) (SW); 4,710 mm (185.4 in)
- Width: 1,850 mm (72.8 in)
- Height: 1,420 mm (55.9 in)
- Curb weight: 1,330–1,434 kg (2,932–3,161 lb)

Chronology
- Predecessor: Kia Forte/K3/Cerato; Kia Ceed (Europe)

The Kia K4 is a compact car (C-segment) manufactured by South Korean automaker Kia since 2024. It is a replacement for the Kia Forte/K3/Cerato, while the K3 nameplate was transferred to a subcompact car.

The K4 was first introduced on 21 March 2024, and was fully introduced on 27 March 2024, at the 2024 New York International Auto Show.

It was initially available as a 4-door sedan/saloon and 5-door hatchback. Since 2026, the K4 is available in a 5-door station wagon/estate version called the K4 Sportswagon.

== Overview ==
The K4 adopts the brand's "Opposites United" design language, it has vertical headlights and taillights with "pronounced edges" in the lighting signature and hidden rear door handles. The saloon has fastback styling with a thick D-Pillar, whereas the hatchback has a shooting brake design.

A station wagon/estate variant named the K4 Sportswagon was unveiled on 13 January 2026. It is 15 mm (0.6 inches) shorter than the sedan/saloon but 265 mm (10.4 in.) longer than the K4 hatch.

The interior of the K4 has the Connected Car Navigation Cockpit operating system (debuted in the EV9) with two screens measures up to almost 30 in (760 mm) when combined, two rows of physical controls for the important vehicle functions and a T-Bar gear lever (for the automatic transmission version) instead of a rotary selector. Other features found in the K4 are the Digital Key 2.0 with Ultra Wideband which allows customers to use their compatible devices or an NFC-enabled smart card as a virtual key and the first Kia to debut Al Assistant voice control technology by saying "Hey Kia".

The sedan, hatchback and wagon/estate models have a boot space of 413 L (14.6 cu ft), 629 L (22.2 cu ft) and 604 L (21.3 cu ft) respectively. Compared to the sedan, the hatchback is 11 in (280 mm) shorter and adds 1 in (25 mm) of rear headroom because of the hatchback's flat roof design.

=== Sedan ===
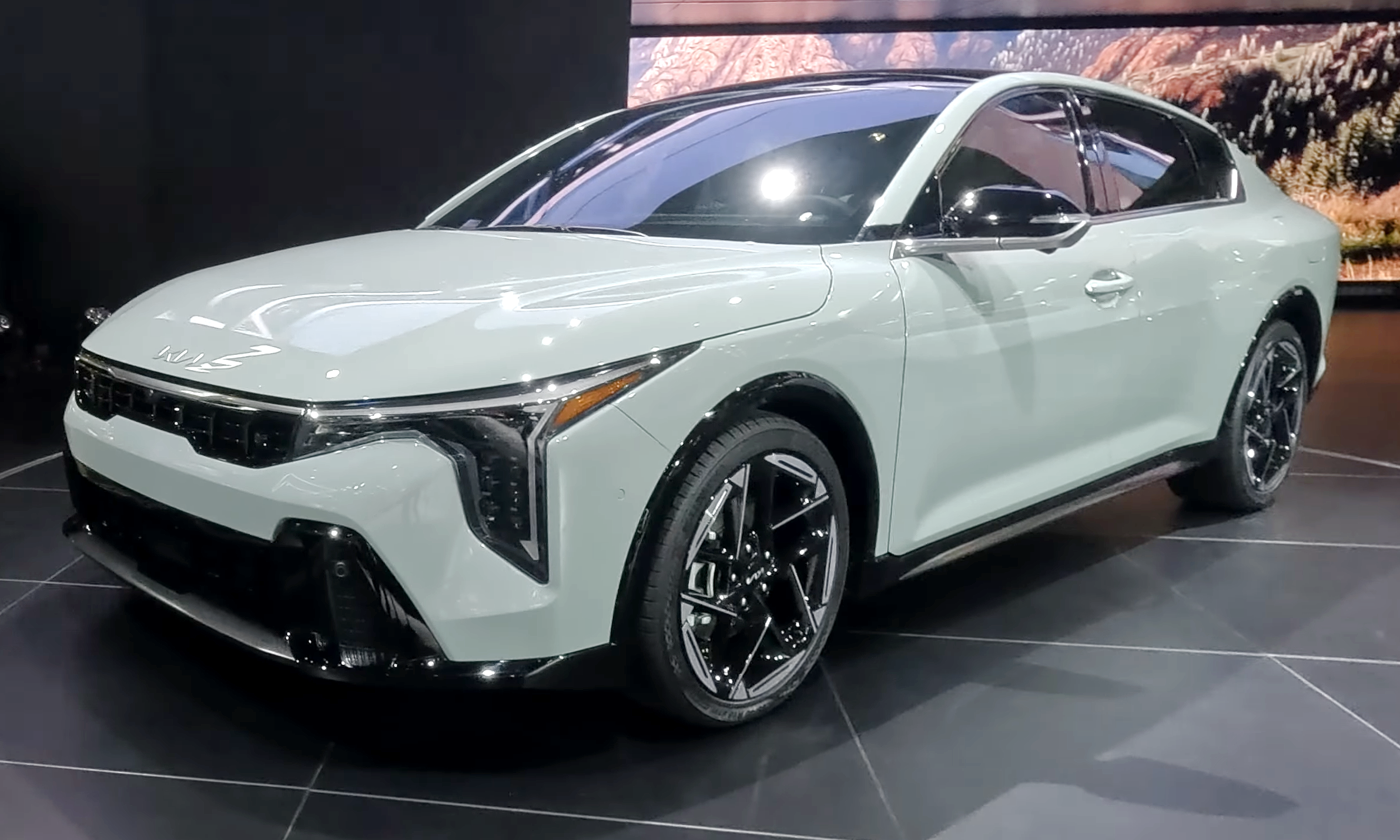
GT-Line sedan (US, front)

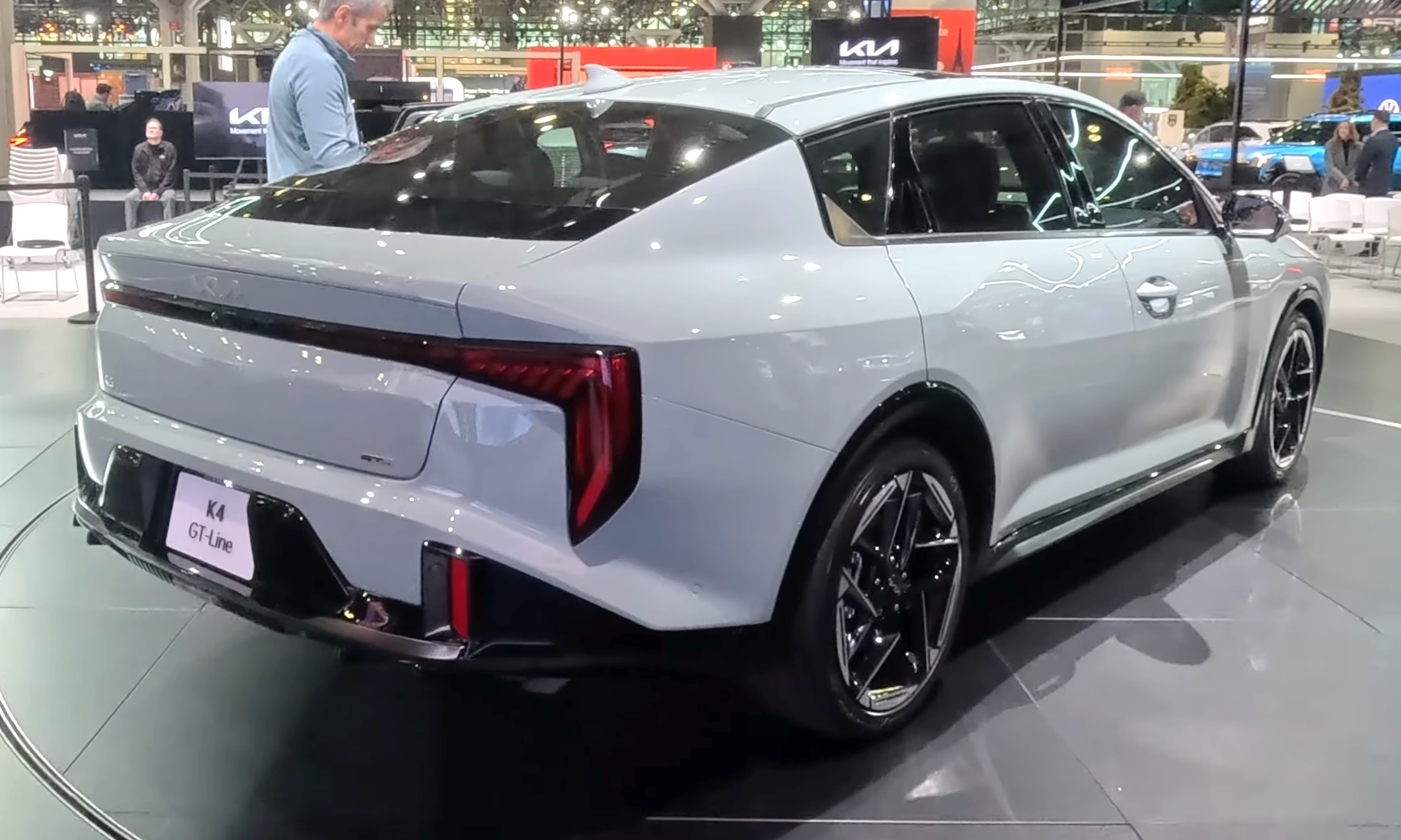
GT-Line sedan (US, rear)

=== Hatchback ===
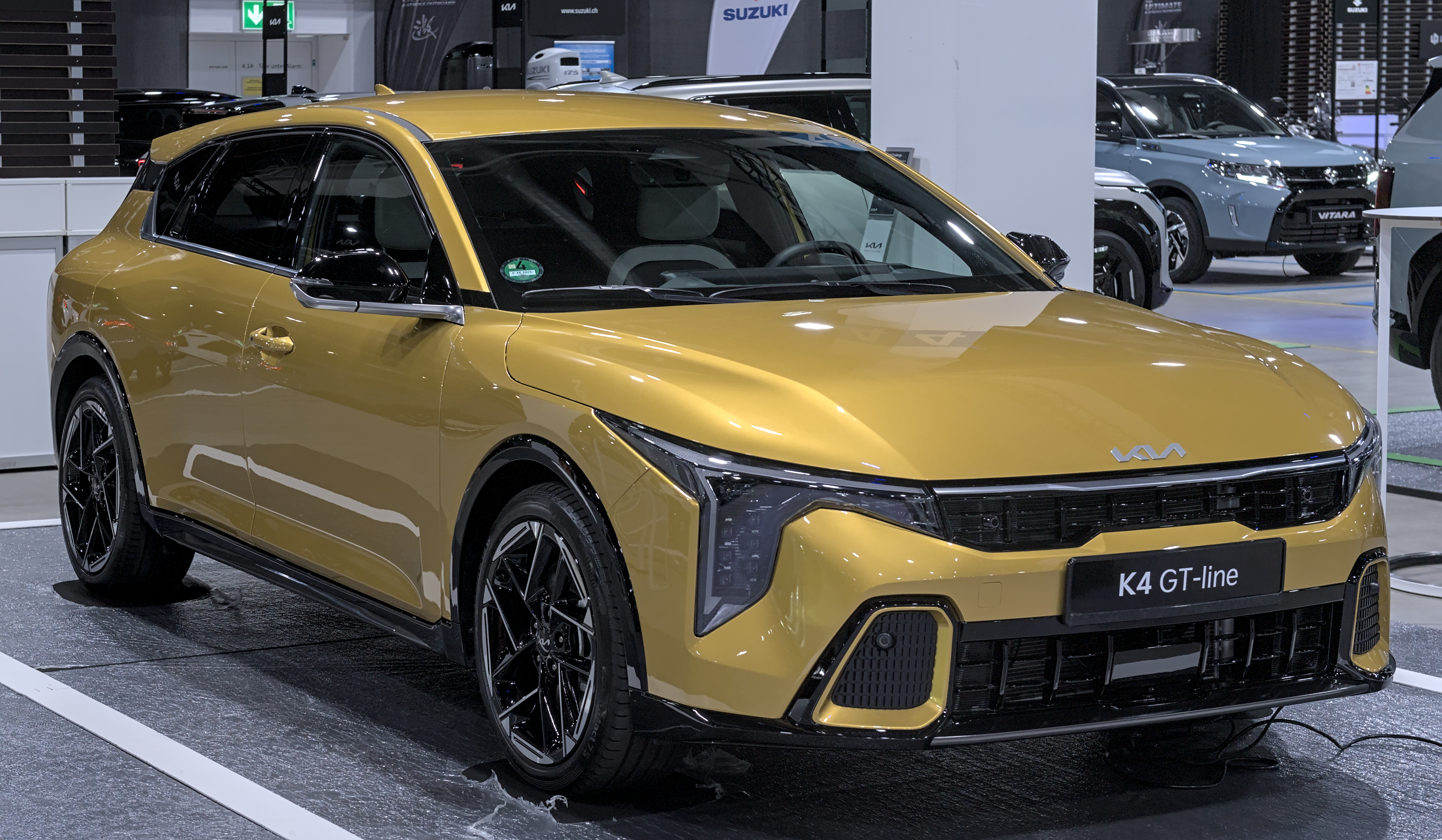
2026 K4 GT-Line hatchback (Europe, front)

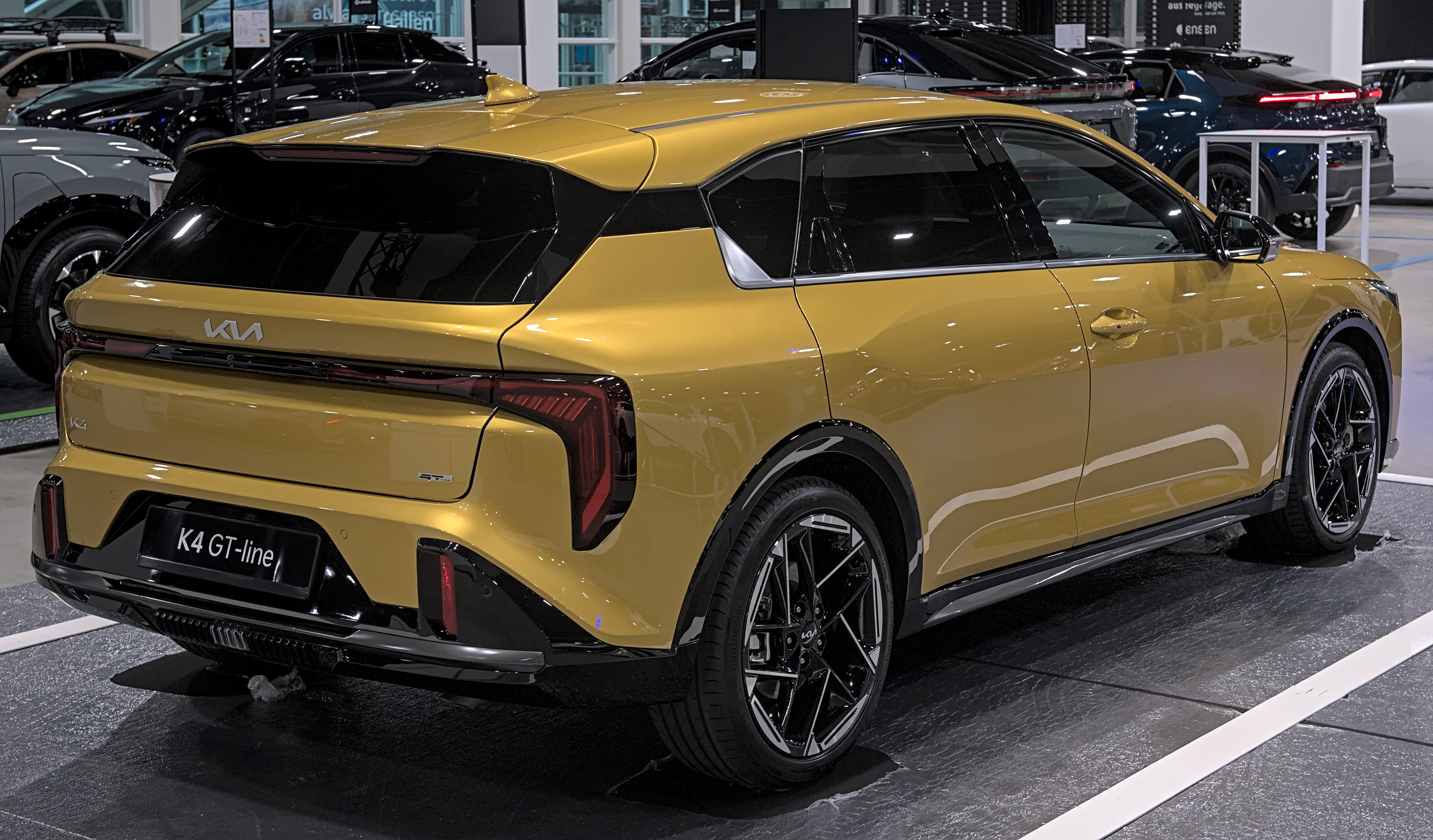
2026 K4 GT-Line hatchback (Europe, rear)

=== Sportswagon ===
2026 K4 Sportswagon (Germany, front)

2026 K4 Sportswagon (Germany, rear)

=== Interior ===
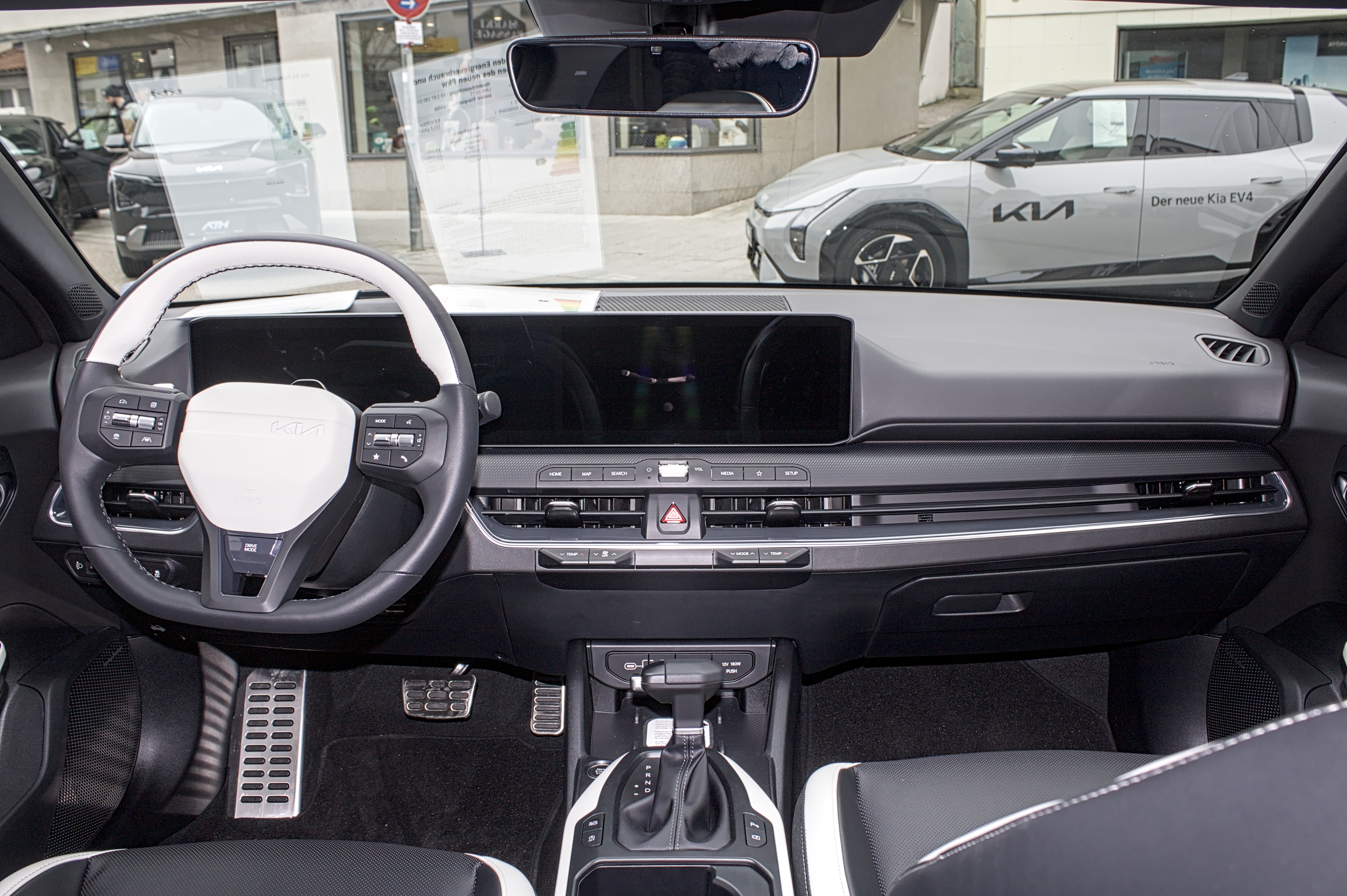
Interior (GT-Line)

== Markets ==
=== Argentina ===
The K4 was launched in Argentina on 14 April 2026, with two trim levels: EX and GT Line, it is powered by the 2.0-litre MPi petrol mated to a 6-speed automatic.

The K4 Hatchback was launched in Argentina on 18 August 2026, in the sole GT Line Turbo variant powered by the 1.6-litre T-GDi turbocharged petrol mated to an 8-speed automatic.

=== Australia ===
The K4 was launched in Australia on 16 January 2025, with four trim levels: S (optional with Safety Pack), Sport, Sport+, and GT Line. For engines, it is available with the 2.0-litre MPi petrol mated to a 6-speed automatic and the 1.6-litre T-GDi turbocharged petrol mated to an 8-speed automatic.

The K4 Hatchback was launched in Australia on 21 November 2025, with the same trim levels the sedan bodystyle. Aside from the introduction of the hatchback bodystyle, 2.0-litre MPi petrol became mated to an IVT replacing the 6-speed automatic.

=== Brunei ===
The K4 was launched in Brunei on 9 April 2026. It is available in sedan and hatchback models and two trim levels offered in GLS (in 1.6-litre naturally aspirated engine with 6-speed automatic) and GT-Line (in 1.6-litre turbocharged engine with 8-speed automatic).

=== Europe ===
The K4 hatchback was unveiled for the European market on 17 September 2025. For engines, it is available with 1.0-litre T-GDi turbocharged petrol engine with and without mild hybrid assistance, and a 1.6-litre T-GDi turbocharged petrol engine.

The K4 Sportswagon is confirmed for the European market.

=== Mexico ===
The K4 sedan went on sale in Mexico on 1 August 2024, it is available in four trim levels: L, LX, EX and GT Line. For engines, it is available with either 2.0-litre MPi petrol or 1.6 T-GDi turbocharged petrol engines.

The K4 Hatchback was launched in Mexico on 7 August 2025, in the sole GT Line Turbo variant, powered by the 1.6 T-GDi turbocharged petrol engine. The entry-level GT Line variant powered by the 2.0-litre MPi petrol engine was added to the line-up in September 2025.

=== Middle East ===
The K4 was launched in the Middle East on 8 May 2025. It is available in three trim levels; LX, EX and GT-Line. For engines, it is available with either 1.6-litre and 2.0-litre MPi petrol and 1.6-litre T-GDi turbocharged petrol engines.

=== United States and Canada ===
The K4 went on sale in North America in August 2024, it is available in LX, LXS (only for US), EX, EX+ (only for Canada), GT Line (available with the Limited package only for Canada). For engines, it is available with either 2.0-litre MPi petrol or 1.6-litre T-GDi turbocharged petrol engines. Initially only available as a sedan, the hatchback was launched in North America for the 2026 model year.

== Safety ==
=== Safety ratings ===
The 2025 model year K4 was awarded "Top Safety Pick" by IIHS and is available with the Advanced Driver Assistance Systems (ADAS).

IIHS scores (2025 model year)
Small overlap front	Good
Moderate overlap front (original test)	Good
Moderate overlap front (updated test)	Acceptable
Side (updated test)	Good
Headlights	Acceptable
Front crash prevention: vehicle-to-pedestrian	Good
Seatbelt reminders	Acceptable
Child seat anchors (LATCH) ease of use	Acceptable

ANCAP test results Kia K4 all saloon variants (excluding S without Safety Pack) (2025, aligned with Euro NCAP)
Test	Points	%
Overall:	5 /5 stars	
Adult occupant:	33.22	83%
Child occupant:	39.58	80%
Pedestrian:	48.54	77%
Safety assist:	14.02	77%

ANCAP test results Kia K4 S without Safety Pack (2025, aligned with Euro NCAP)
Test	Points	%
Overall:	4 /5 stars	
Adult occupant:	33.22	83%
Child occupant:	39.58	80%
Pedestrian:	46.54	73%
Safety assist:	11.58	64%

Latin NCAP 3.5 test results Great Wall Motors Wingle 5 + 2 Airbags (2025, similar to Euro NCAP 2017)
Test	Points	%
Overall:	5 /5 stars	
Adult occupant:	36.75	92%
Child occupant:	44.29	90%
Pedestrian:	37.01	77%
Safety assist:	36.25	84%

Euro NCAP test results Kia K4 1.6 T-GDi, 'Spirit', LHD (2025)
Test	Points	%
Overall:	4 /5 stars	
Adult occupant:	32.4	80%
Child occupant:	42.4	86%
Pedestrian:	64	73%
Safety assist:	12.1	67%

Euro NCAP test results Kia K4 1.6 T-GDi, 'Spirit', LHD (with Safety Pack) (2025)
Test	Points	%
Overall:	5 /5 stars	
Adult occupant:	32.4	80%
Child occupant:	42.4	86%
Pedestrian:	68	77%
Safety assist:	13.5	75%

== Sales ==
Calendar year	US	Canada	Mexico
2024	139,778 (Note: Includes both K4 and Forte)		4,317
2025	140,514	13,984 (Note: Includes total sales starting from launch in Q4 2024)	
