= Kia Cerato =

Compact car

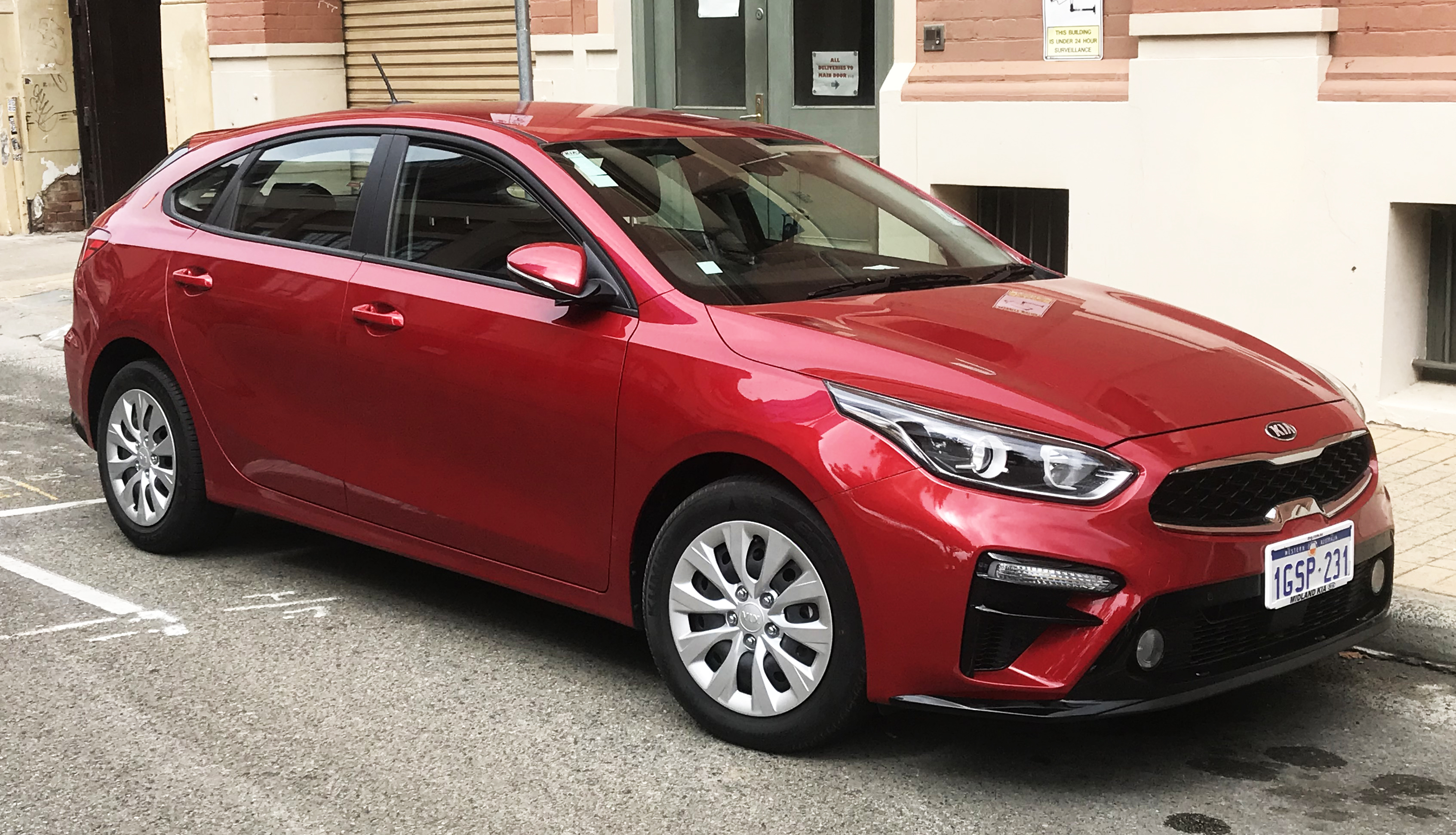

Overview
- Manufacturer: Kia
- Also called: Kia Forte/K3 (2009–2024)
- Production: 2003-2007 (Europe); 2003–2024 (America); 2003–present (Asia)

Body and chassis
- Class: Compact car (C-segment)
- Body style: 5-door hatchback 4-door sedan/saloon
- Layout: Front-engine, front-wheel-drive

Chronology
- Predecessor: Kia Sephia
- Successor: Kia K4 Sedan (America)

The Kia Cerato (also known as the Kia Forte in North America, K3 in South Korea or the Forte K3 or Shuma in China) is a compact car produced by the South Korean manufacturer Kia since 2003. In 2008, the Cerato nameplate was replaced by the Forte nameplate in the North American market and the K3 nameplate in South Korea. However, the "Cerato" name remains in use in markets such as Australasia, Middle East and Latin America. It is available in five-door hatchback, two-door coupe and four-door sedan variants. It is not available in Europe (including the UK) since 2007, where the similar sized Kia Ceed is offered (except for Russia and Ukraine, where the Ceed and the Cerato are both available).

In some markets, such as North America, the Cerato is marketed as the Kia Forte replacing the Spectra nameplate of previous generations. In Colombia and Singapore, the name Cerato Forte was used for the second generation, while Naza Automotive Manufacturing of Malaysia has assembled the vehicle since 2009, selling it there under the name Naza Forte.

== First generation (LD; 2003) ==
First generation (LD)
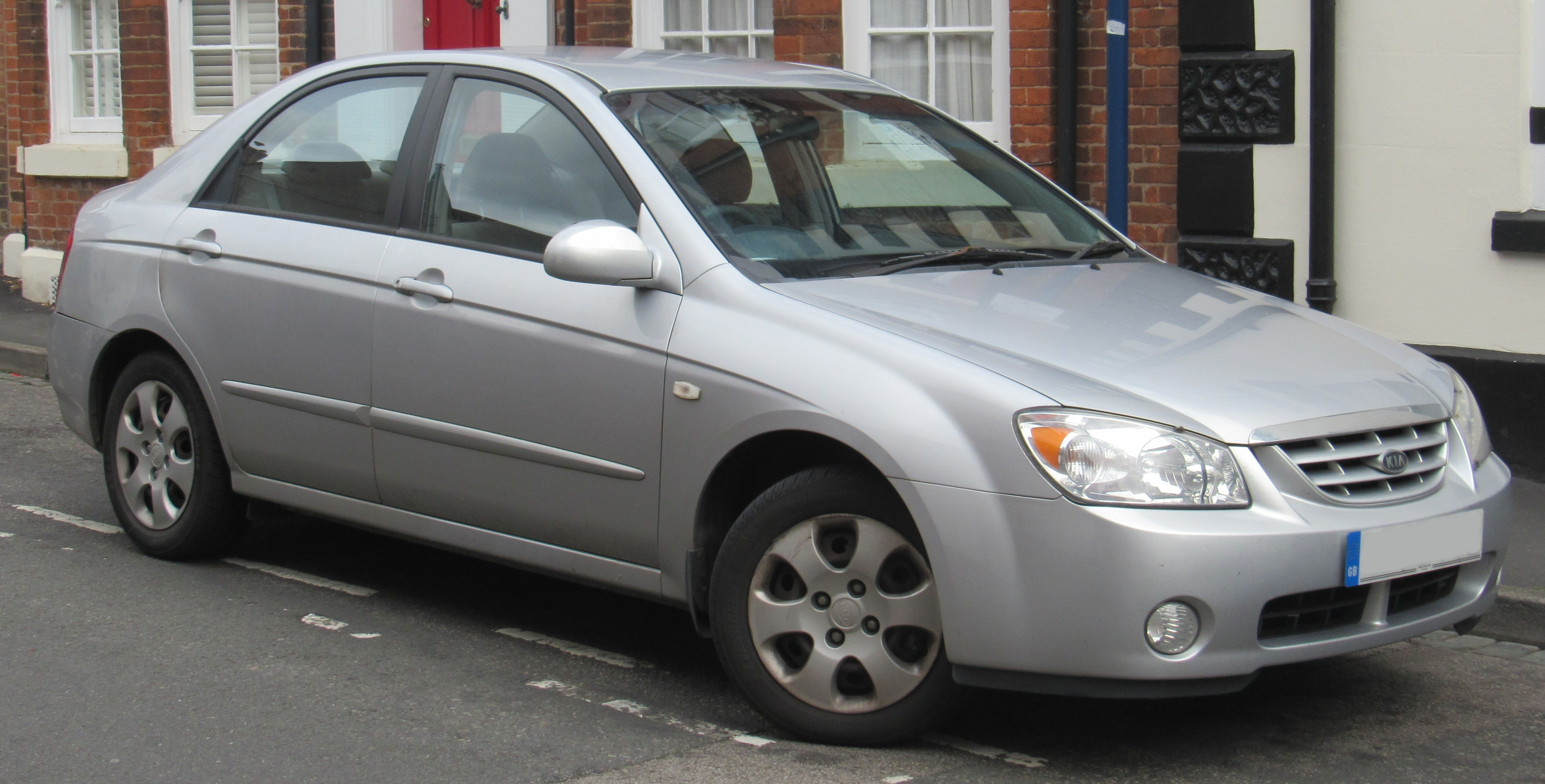
- Kia Cerato sedan (pre-facelift)

Overview
- Also called: Kia Sephia (Latin America); Kia Spectra (North and Latin America, Malaysia); Horki 300EV (China)
- Production: 2003–2008; 2004–2020 (China)
- Model years: 2004–2009
- Assembly: South Korea: Hwaseong (Hwaseong Plant); China: Yancheng (Yancheng Plant) (DYK); Malaysia: Gurun (NAM)

Body and chassis
- Body style: 4-door sedan 5-door hatchback
- Platform: Hyundai-Kia J3 platform
- Related: Kia Carens

Powertrain
- Engine: gasoline: 1.6 L Alpha II DOHC I4; 1.8 L Beta II I4 (China); 2.0 L Beta II CVVT I4; diesel: 1.5 L U CRDi-VGT I4 (turbo diesel); 1.6 L U CRDi-VGT I4 (turbo diesel); 2.0 L D CRDi I4 (turbo diesel)
- Transmission: 5-speed manual 4-speed automatic

Dimensions
- Wheelbase: 2,610 mm (102.8 in)
- Length: 2003–06 sedan: 4,480 mm (176.4 in); 2006–08 sedans: 4,500 mm (177.2 in); 2003–06 hatchback: 4,341 mm (170.9 in); 2006–09 hatchback: 4,350 mm (171.3 in)
- Width: 1,735 mm (68.3 in)
- Height: 1,470 mm (57.9 in)

Chronology
- Successor: Kia Ceed (hatchback)

The Kia Cerato was introduced in South Korea in 2003, sharing a platform with the Hyundai Elantra (XD) and using Hyundai's Beta II (G4GC) (CVVT-enabled) four-cylinder engine. It replaced the Sephia/Mentor sedan and Shuma hatchback.

In North America, the "Spectra" name was used when introduced for the 2004 model year, with "Spectra5" designating the hatchback. For Latin American markets, the Cerato was still named Sephia until 2005, when it was discontinued in favor of the name Spectra. In Europe, the Cerato was replaced by the Kia Cee'd.

For the Malaysian market, the first generation Spectra was launched in Malaysia on August 15, 2007 as the "Spectra5" available only with one trim level and with the hatchback bodystyle powered by a 1.6-litre, four-cylinder, 16-valve, DOHC CVVT engine with a 4-speed automatic transmission.

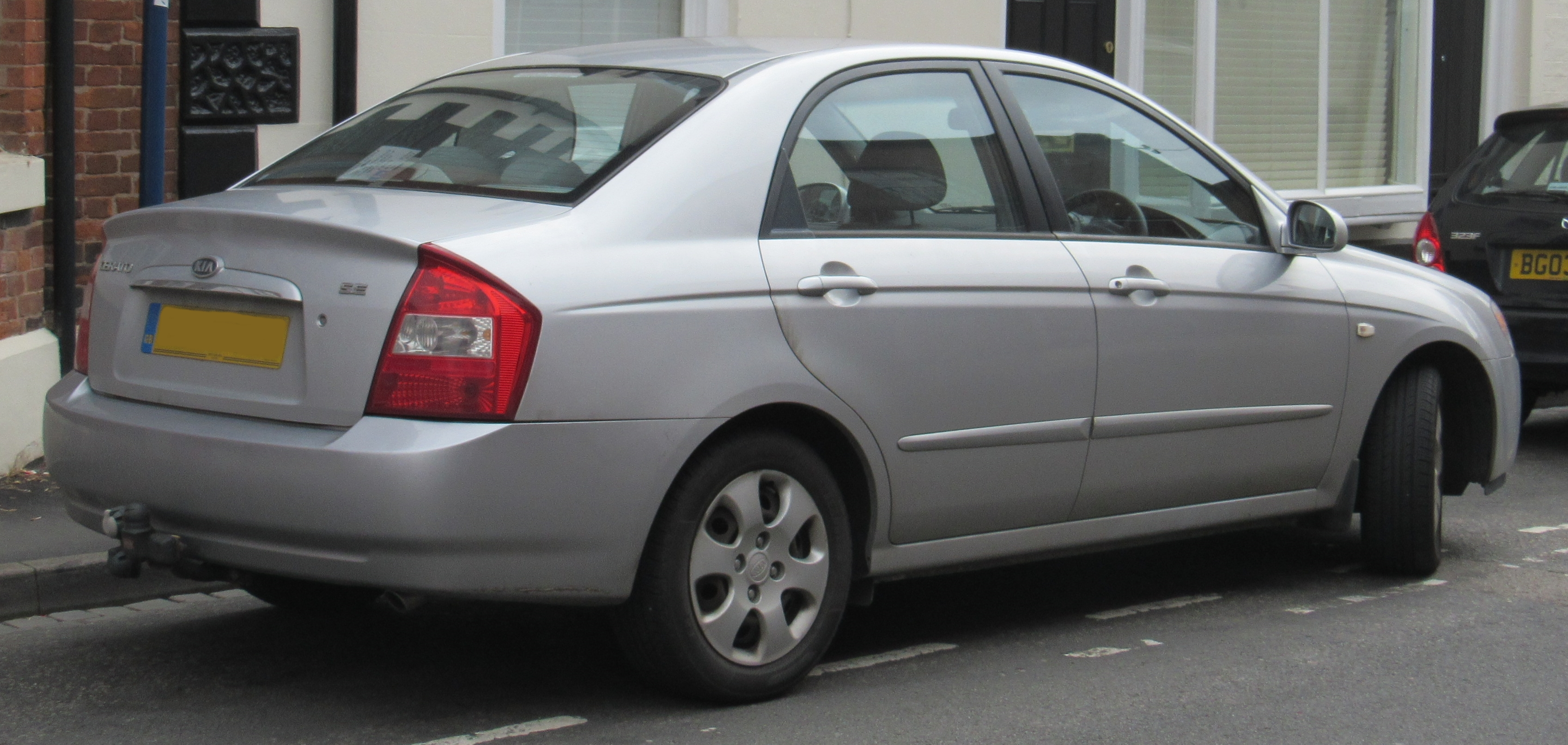
2005 Kia Cerato SE saloon (UK)

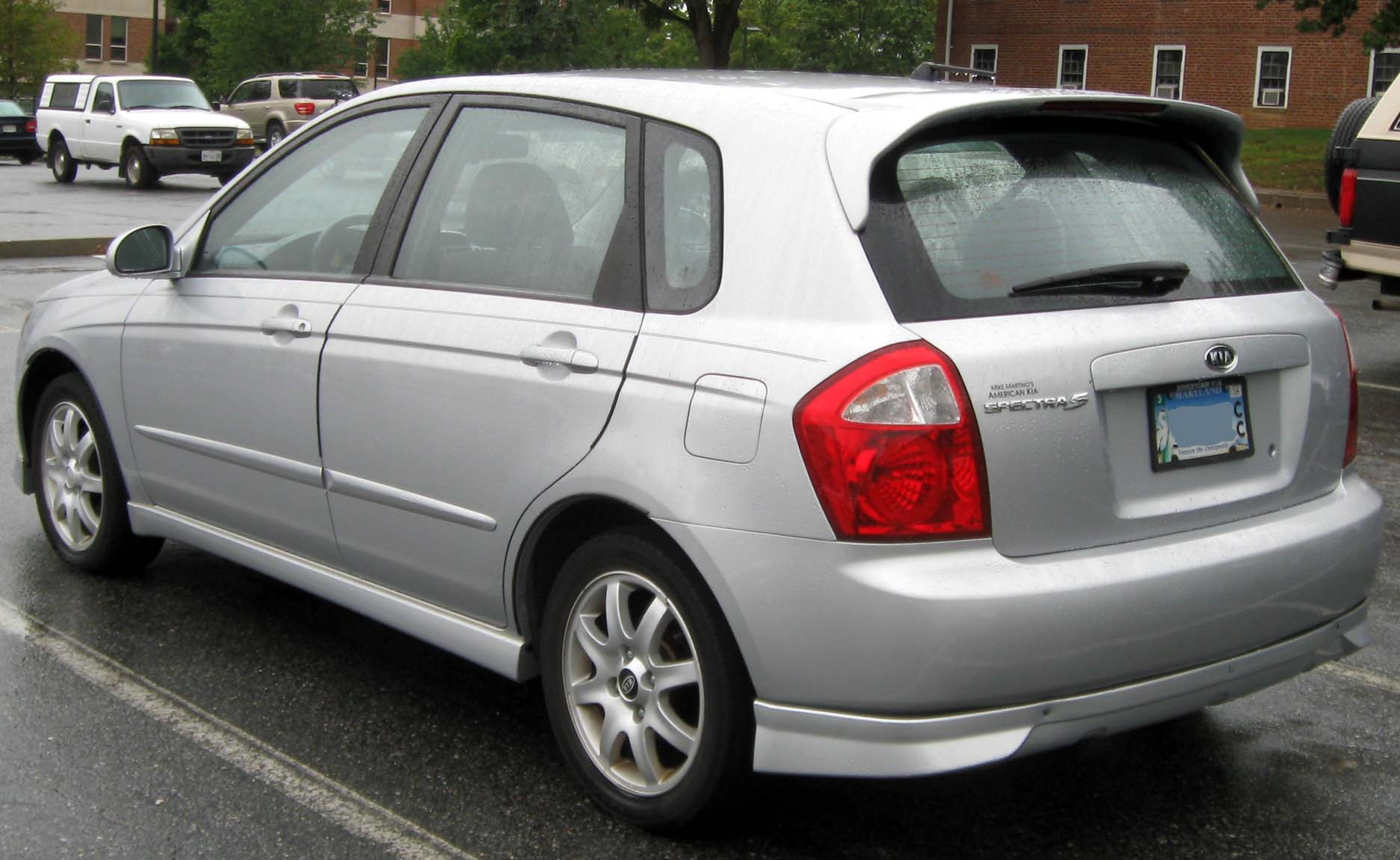
2004–2006 Kia Spectra5 SX hatchback (US)

=== Facelift ===
In 2006, a facelift version was introduced, including revised Gamma engines. Stylistically, the bumper and headlamps lost their pronounced crease near the grille area, the trunk lid became more rounded, and the tail lights were reshaped.

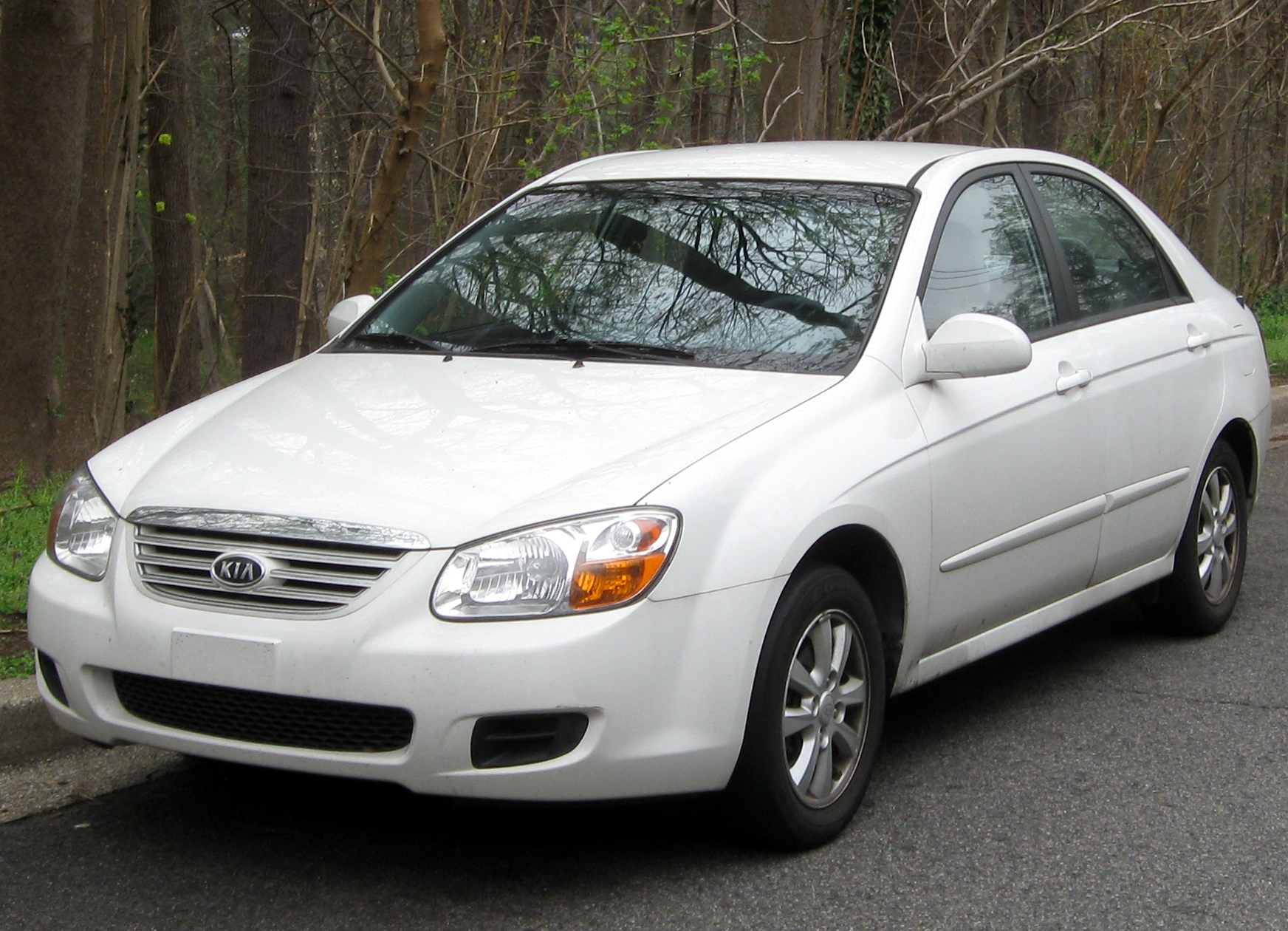
2007-09 Kia Spectra EX sedan (US)

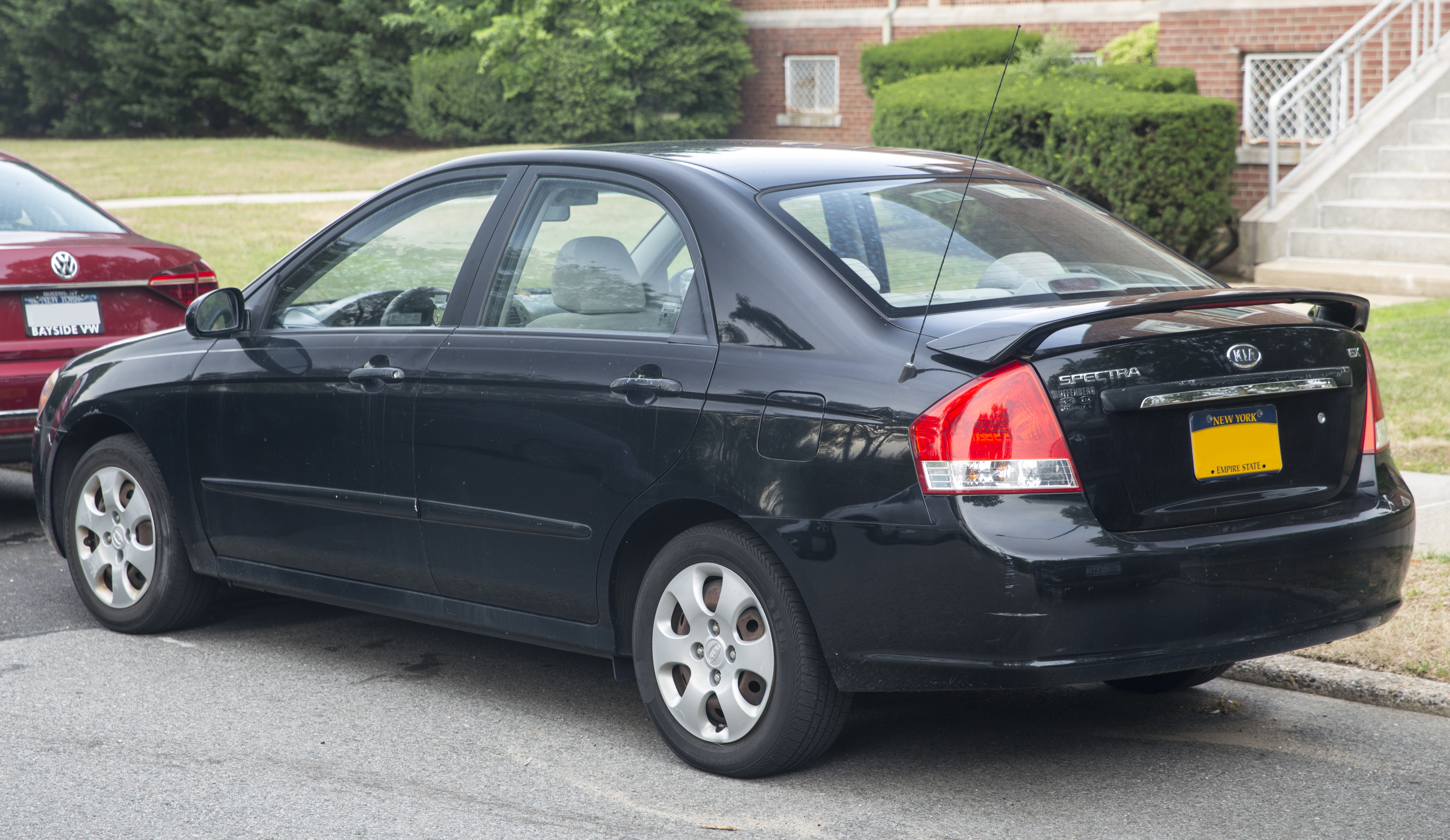
2007-09 Kia Spectra EX sedan (US)

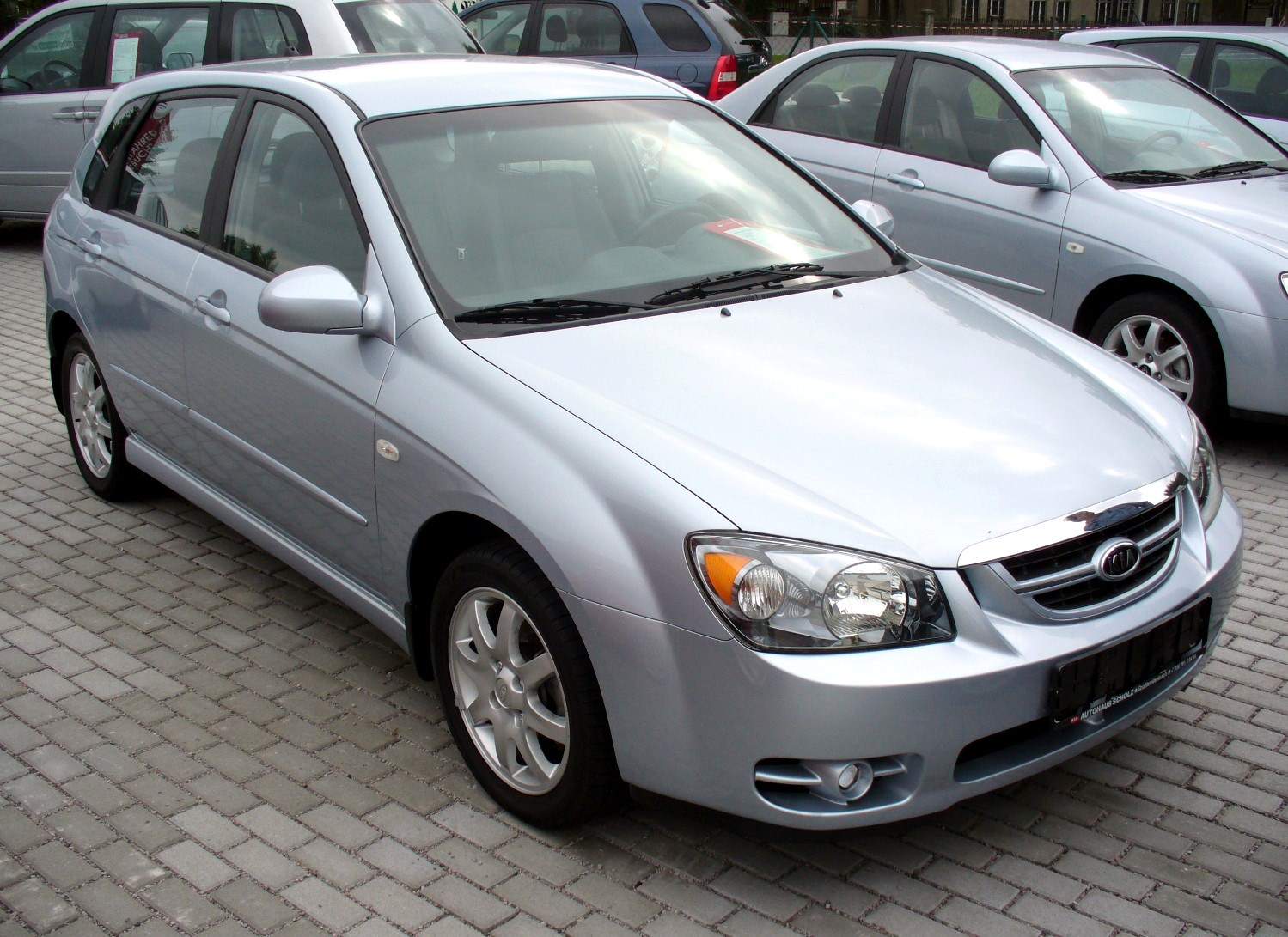
2008 Kia Cerato hatchback (Europe)

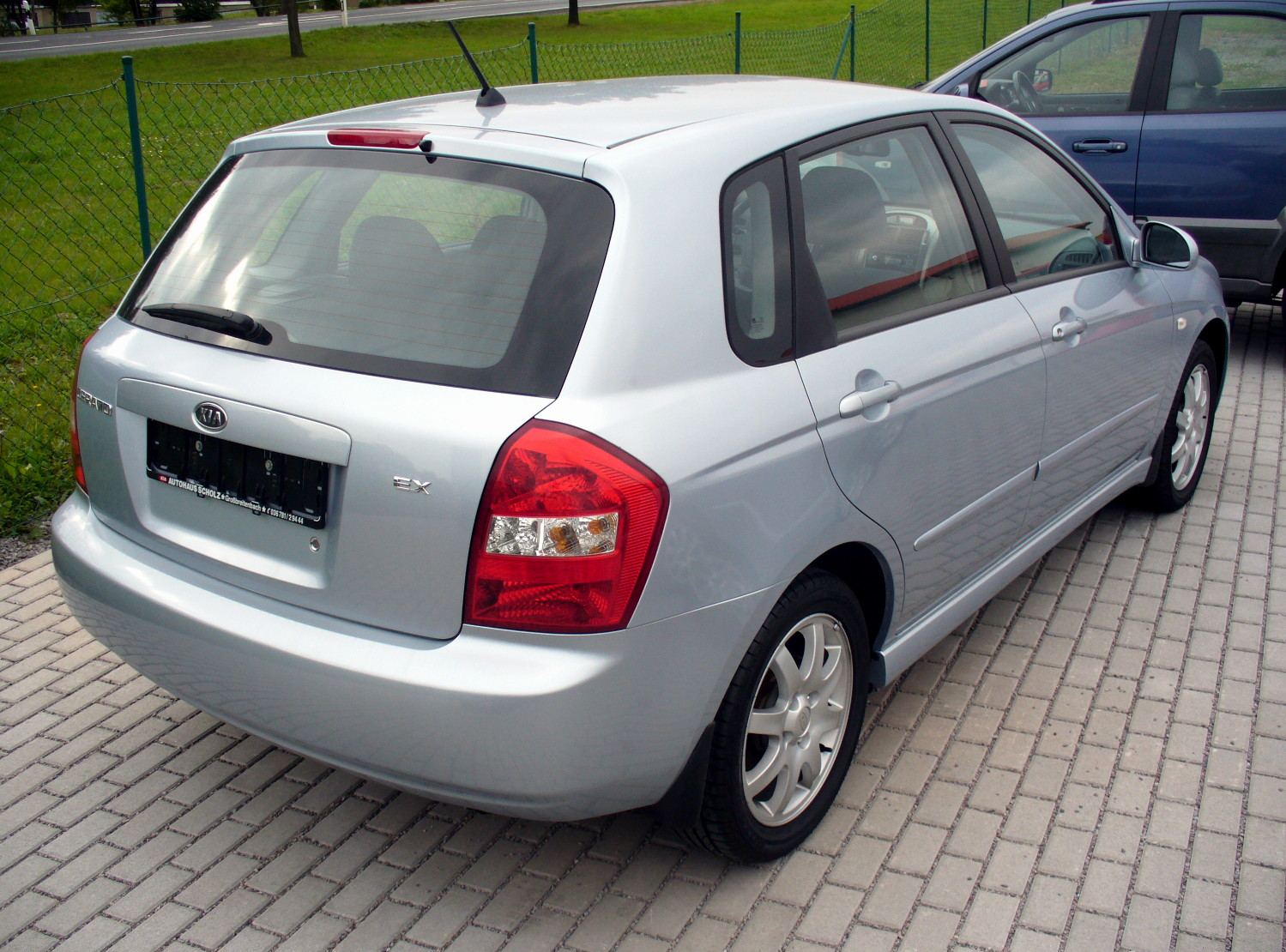
2008 Kia Cerato hatchback (Europe)

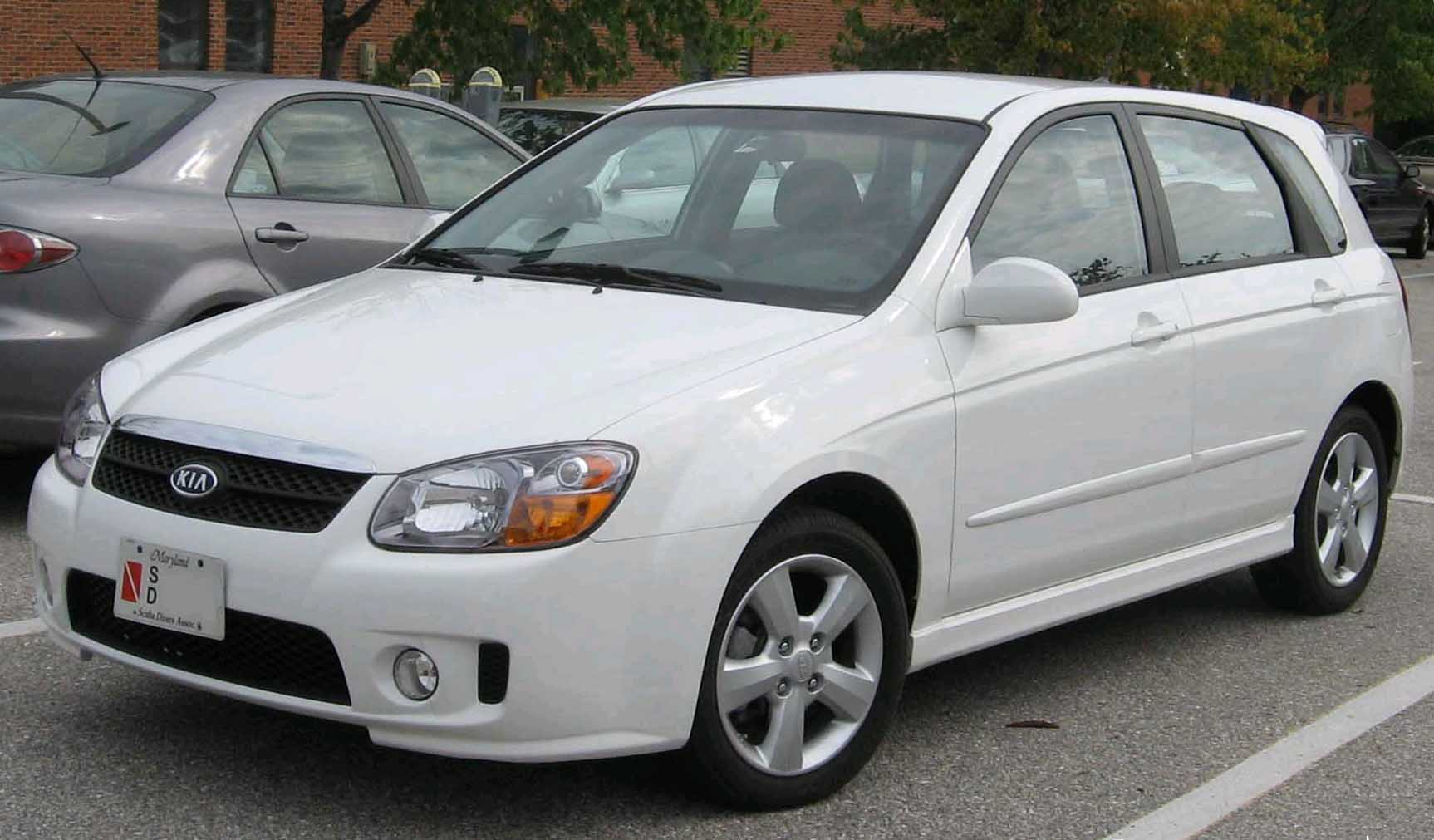
2007 Kia Spectra5 hatchback (US)

=== Cerato Green concept car ===
At the 2004 Geneva Motor Show, the Cerato Green Concept was presented, featuring Kia's new 2.0-liter CRDi diesel engine and showcasing the first Kia passenger car to be diesel-powered.

=== Motorsports ===
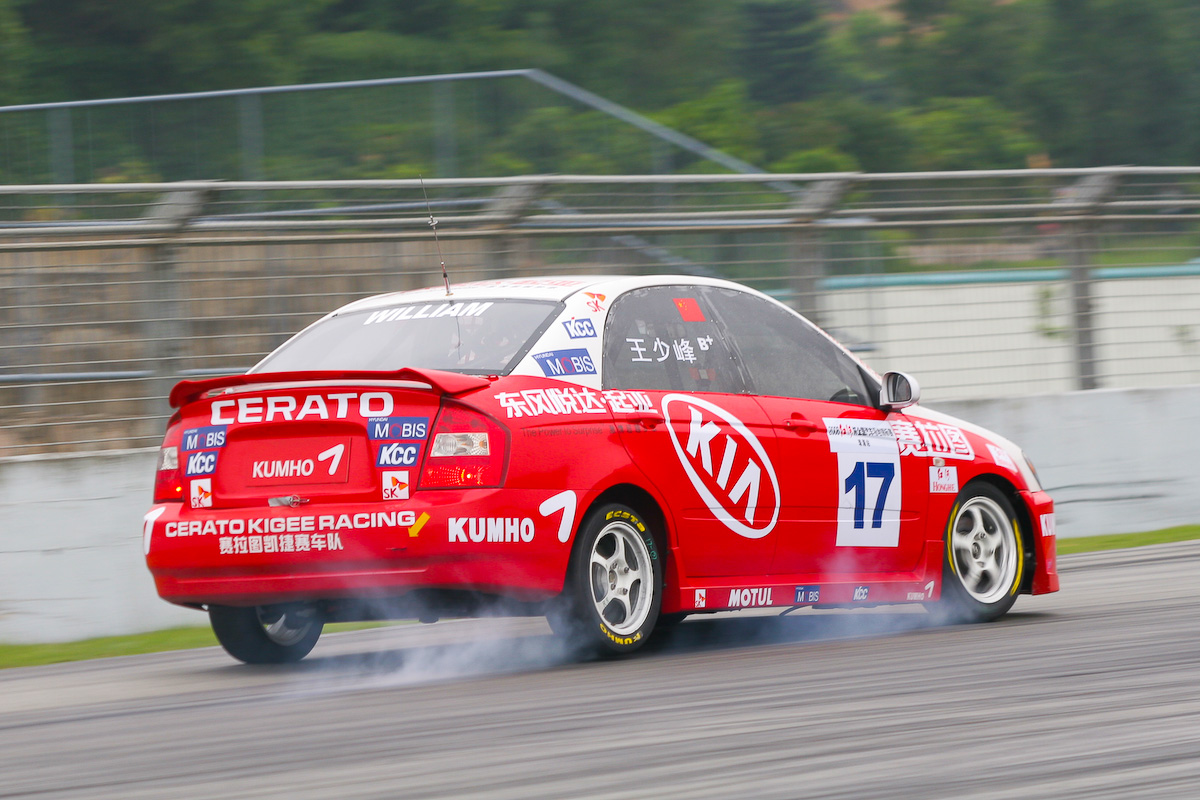
The Cerato during the 2006 China National Automobile Track Championship

In China, Dongfeng Yueda Kia and the Shandong Kigee Racing Club jointly entered the 2006 National Automobile Track Championship 1600CC using a modified Cerato 1.6 driven by Wang Shaofeng and Liu Yang.

=== Kia Cerato R and Horki 300EV ===
The Kia Cerato R is the extensive facelift of the Kia Cerato to extend sales within the Chinese market, while the second generation Kia Cerato was sold as the Kia Forte in China at the same time. The design was significantly updated to be in line with other newer Kia products. The Horki 300EV is a compact electric sedan with the design being essentially a rebadged version of the Kia Cerato R from the Chinese market, it was unveiled on the 2016 Auto Guangzhou. The platform is the same as the first generation Kia Cerato, which is still in production in China as the Cerato R.

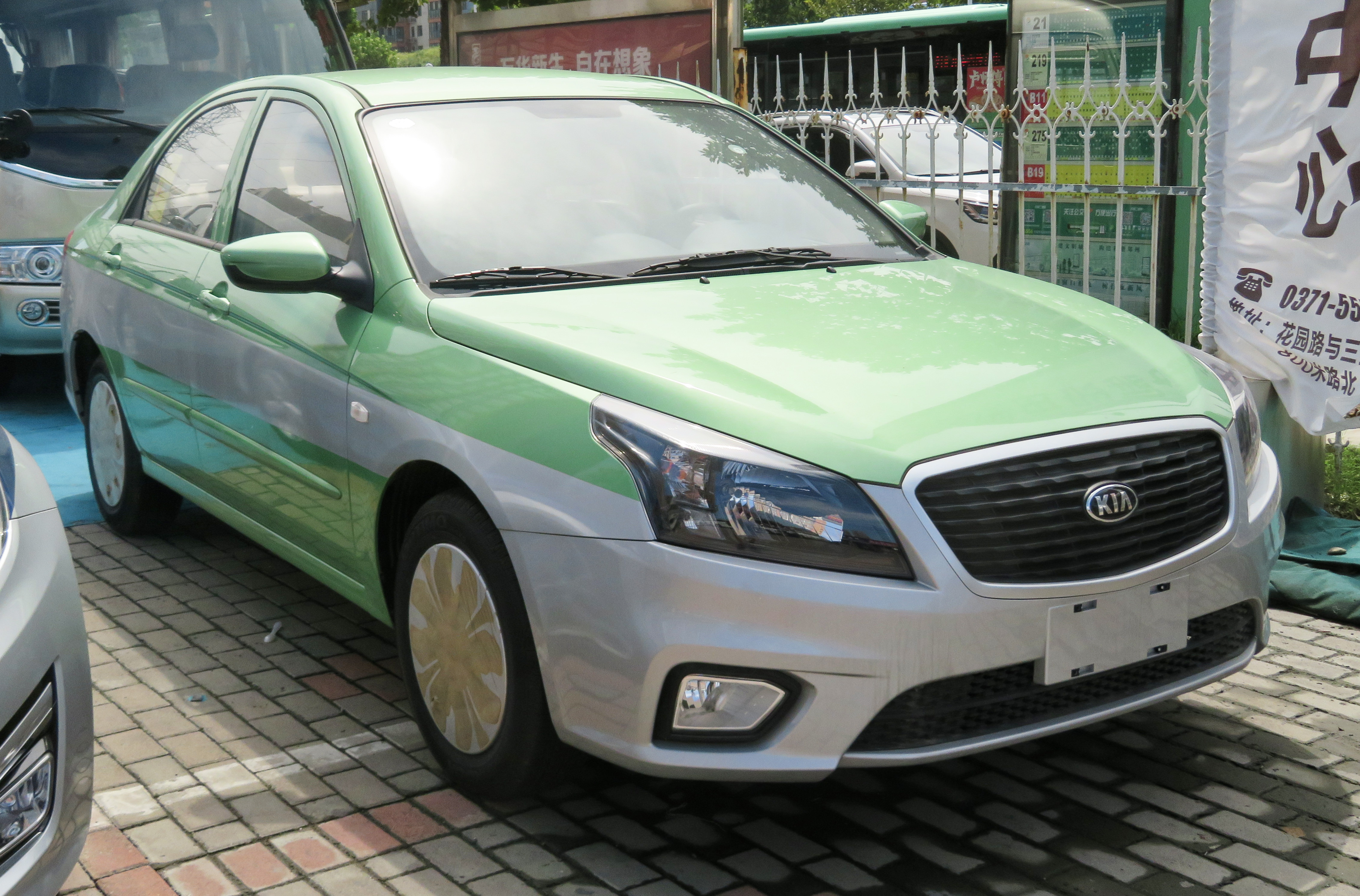
Kia Cerato R taxi (CN)

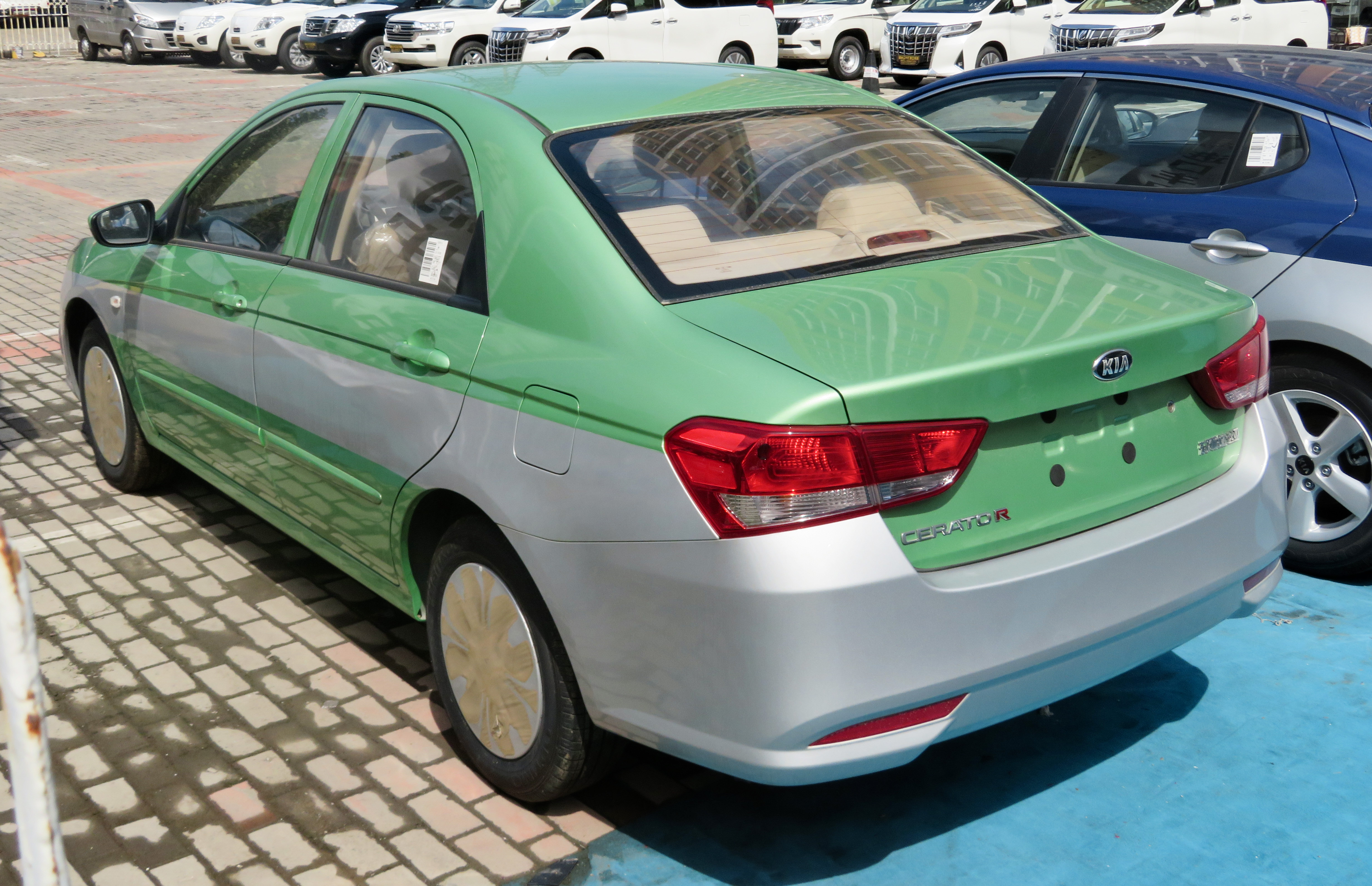
Kia Cerato R taxi (CN)

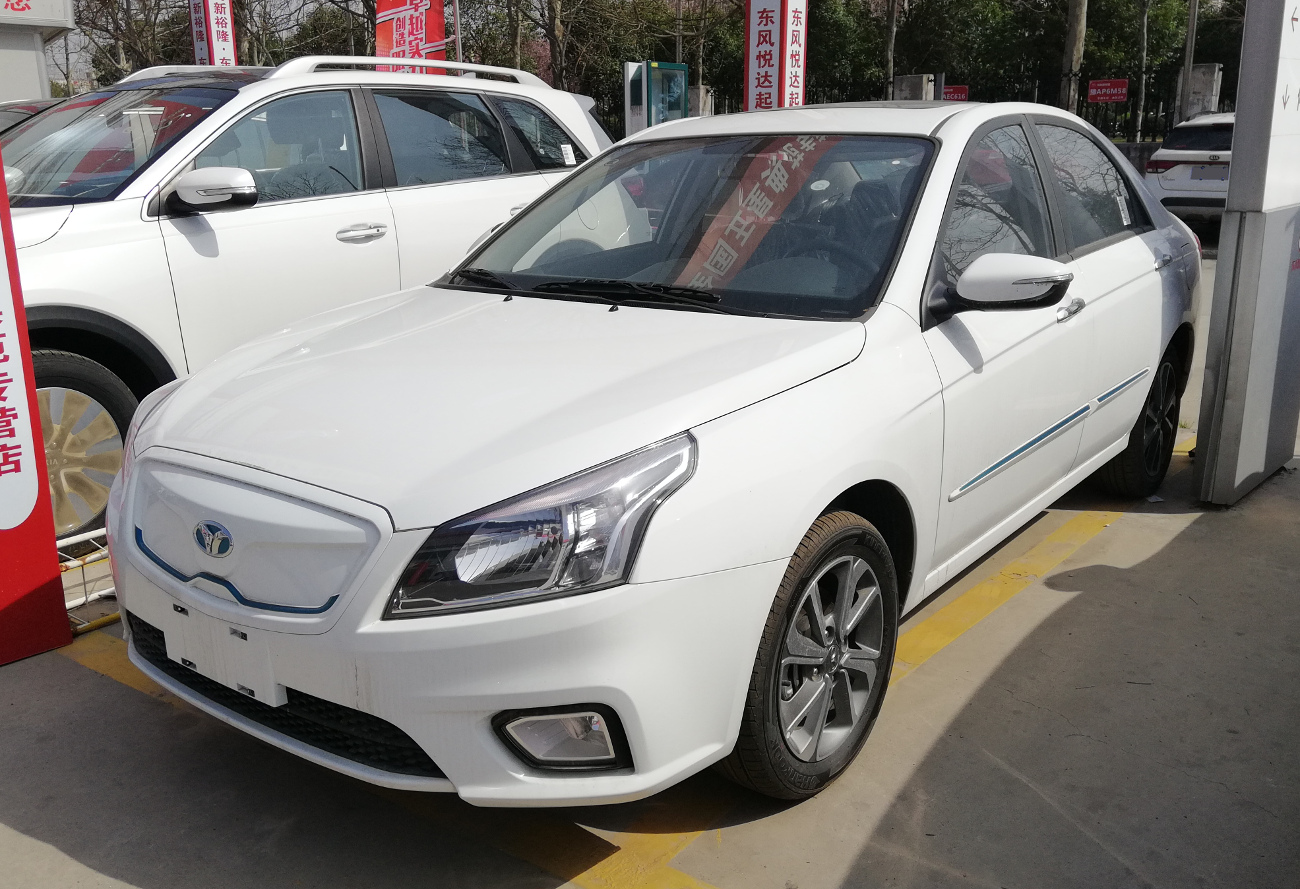
Horki 300E (CN)

=== Safety ===
ANCAP test results Kia Cerato variant(s) as tested (2007)
Test	Score
Overall	3 /5 stars
Frontal offset	10.02/16
Side impact	8.88/16
Pole	Not Assessed
Seat belt reminders	1/3
Whiplash protection	Not Assessed
Pedestrian protection	Poor
Electronic stability control	Not Available

== Second generation (TD; 2008) ==
The second generation Kia Cerato was launched in South Korea in late 2008 under the Kia Forte name – a name that was used in most international markets. The "Cerato" name has been retained in some markets, such as Australia, Middle East, South Africa, Brazil and the Caribbean. In Singapore, the second generation model is badged "Kia Cerato Forte".

=== Hatchback ===
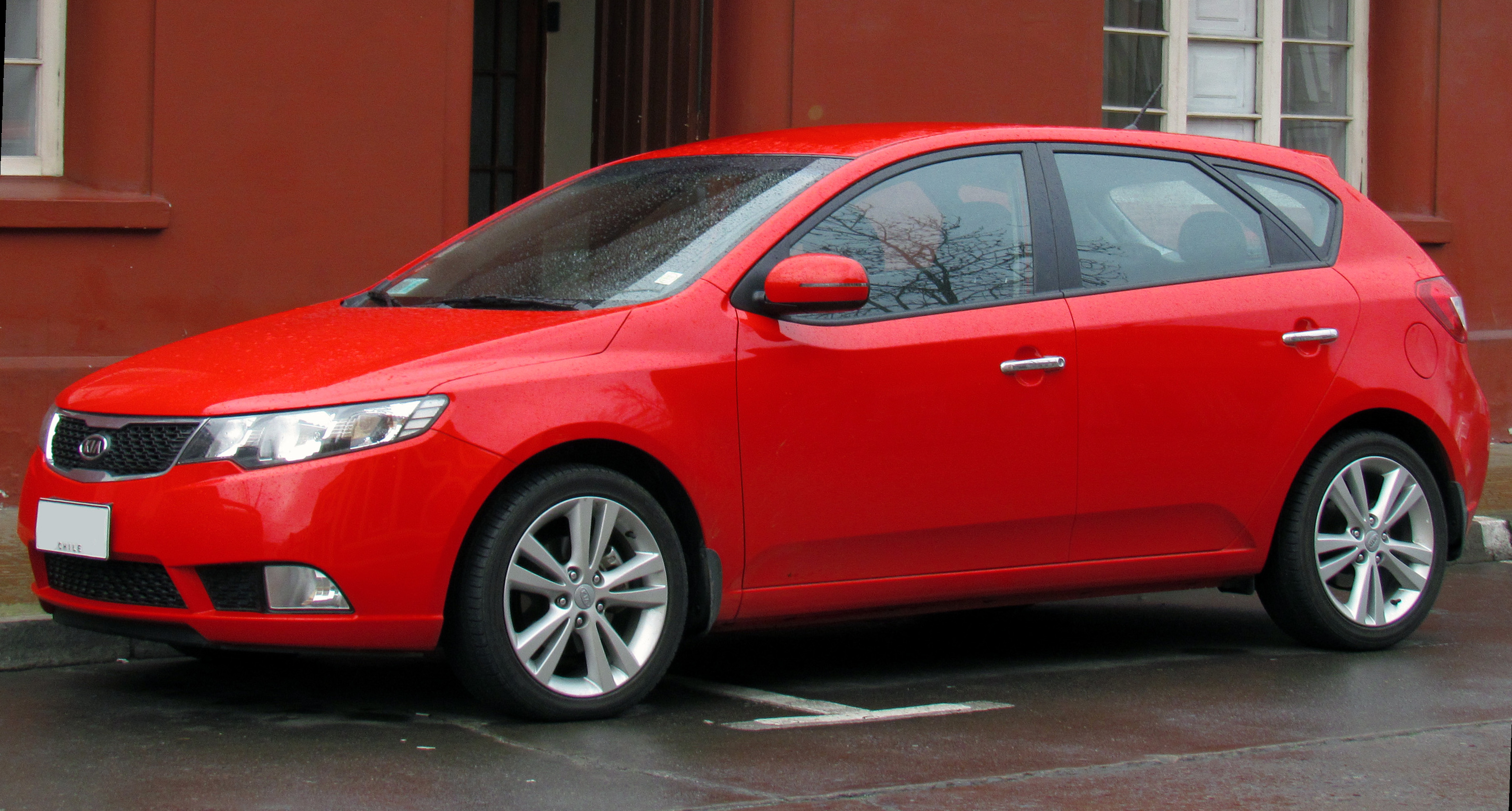
2012 Kia Cerato SX

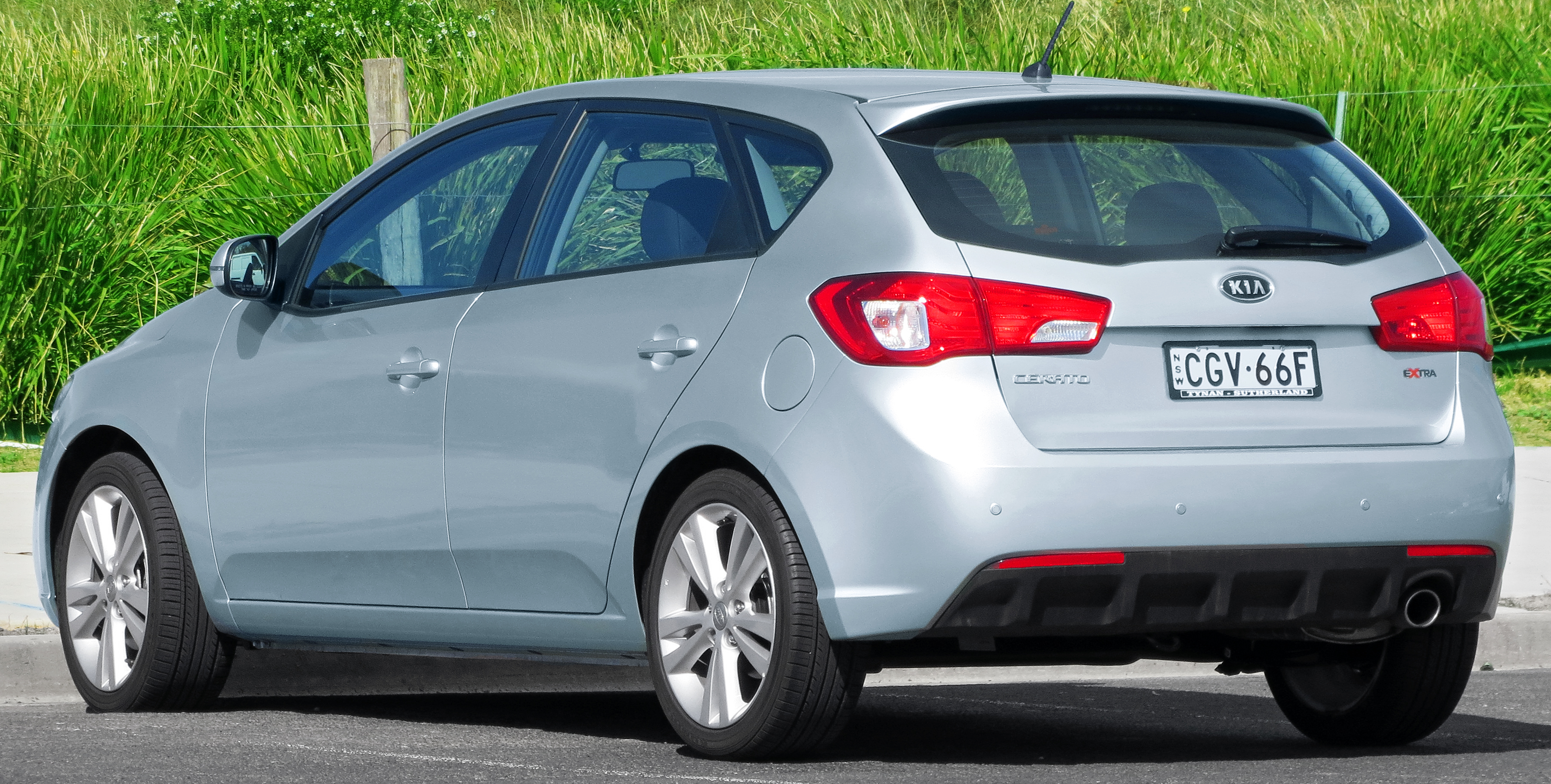
Kia Cerato TD hatchback (Australia)

=== Sedan ===
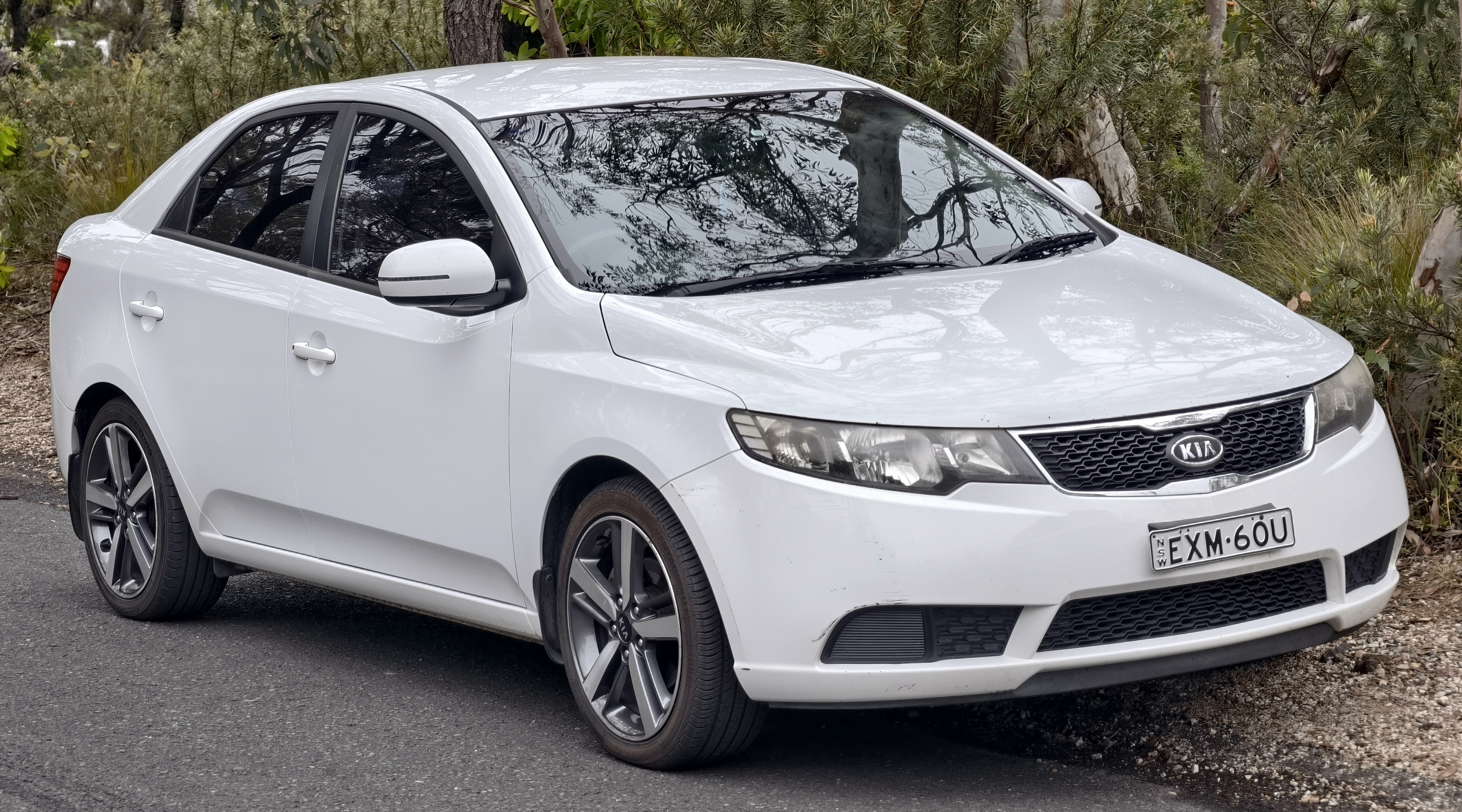
Kia Cerato sedan

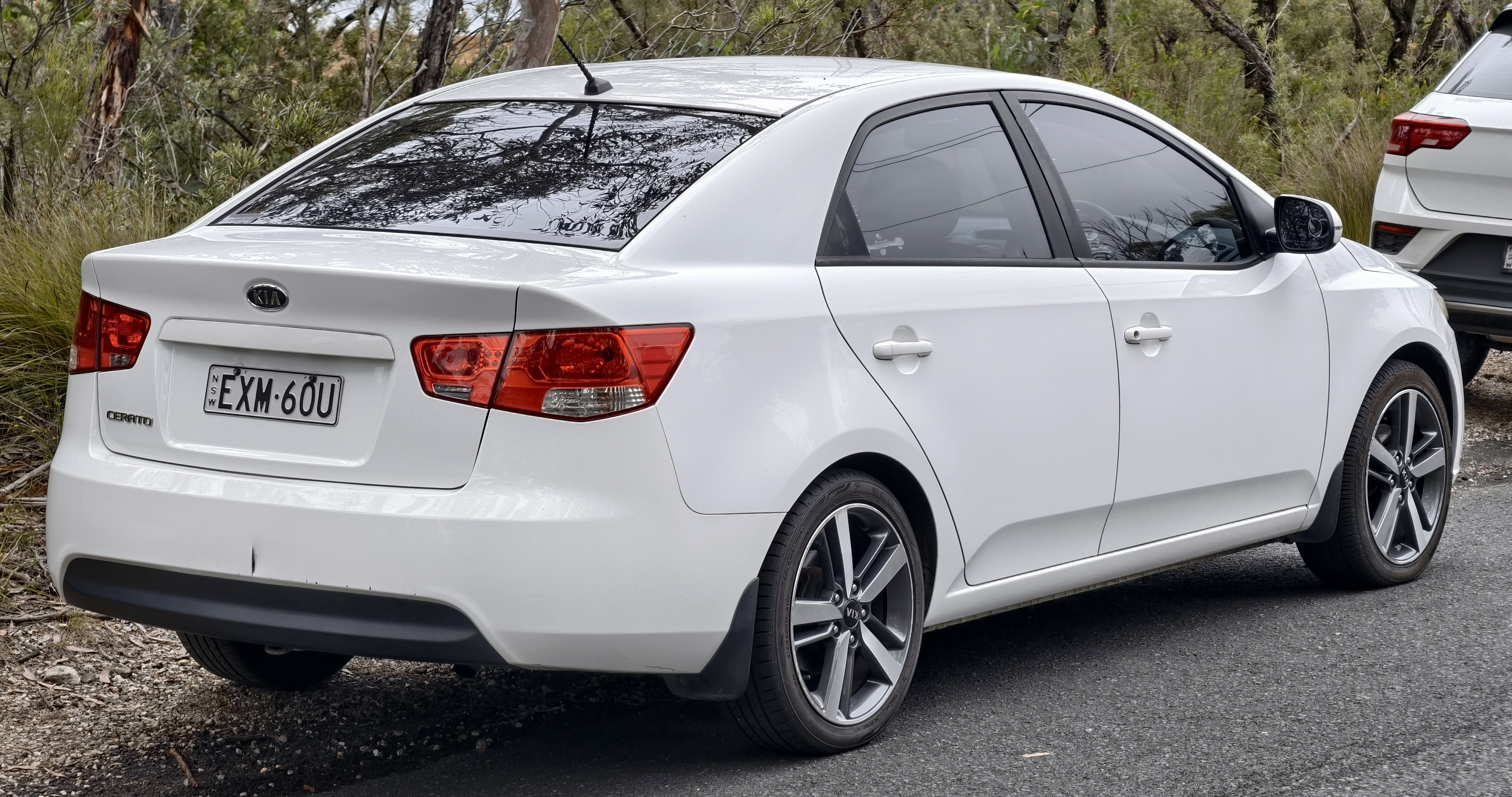
Kia Cerato sedan

=== Coupe (Koup) ===
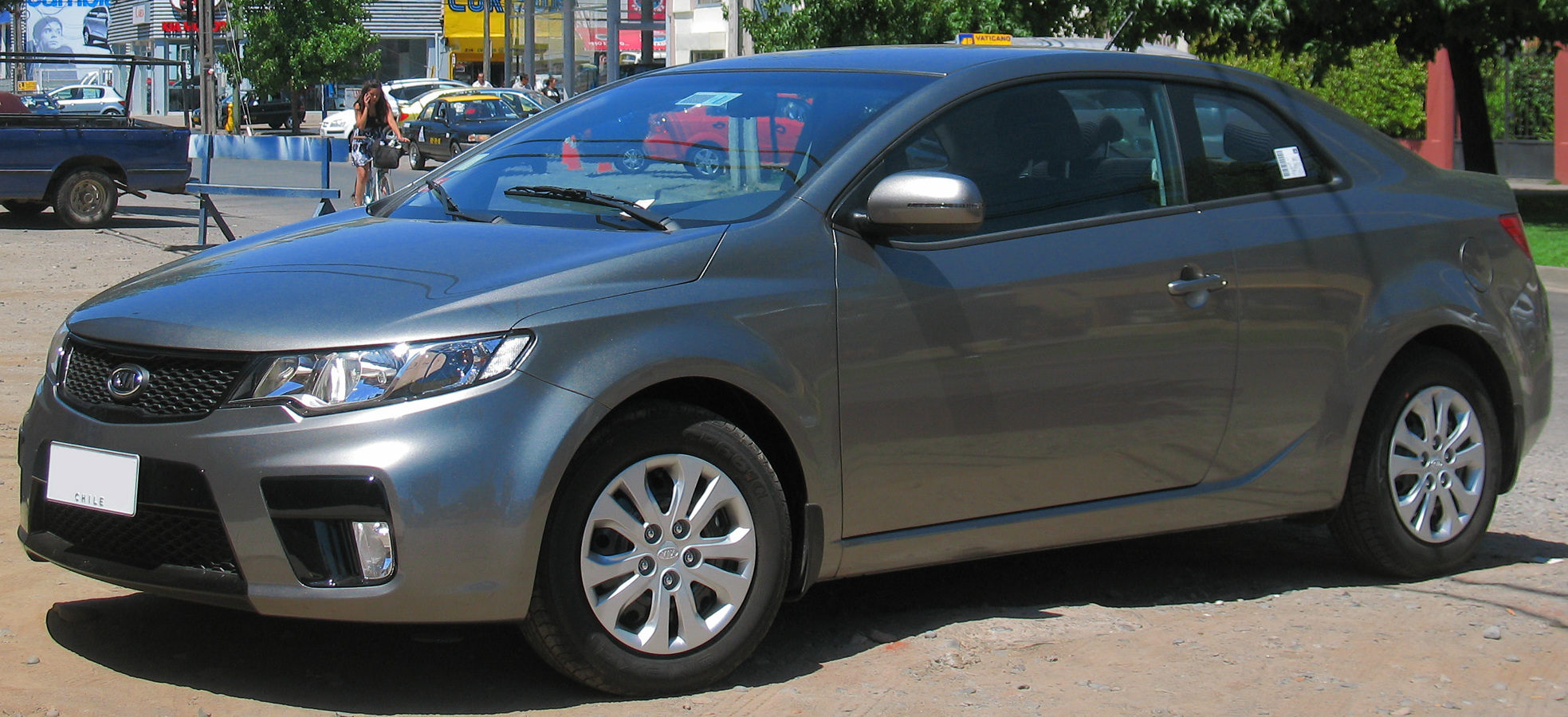
Kia Cerato Koup

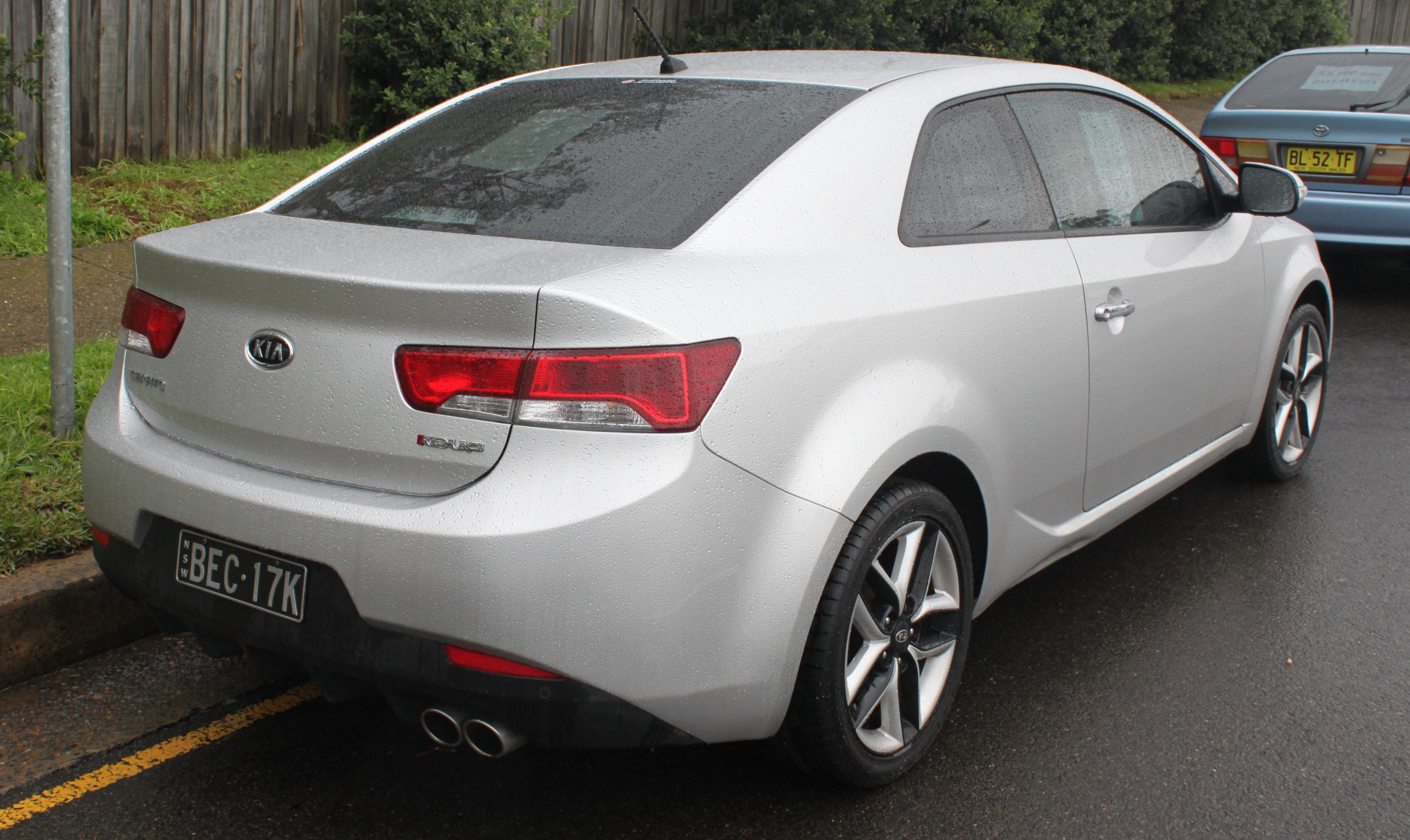
Kia Cerato Koup rear

== Third generation (YD; 2012) ==
Kia released images of the third generation Cerato for the 2014 model year in late July 2012, when the company revealed its Korean-market counterpart, Kia K3. The car is completely redesigned with a lower, wider, and longer stance.

=== Hatchback ===
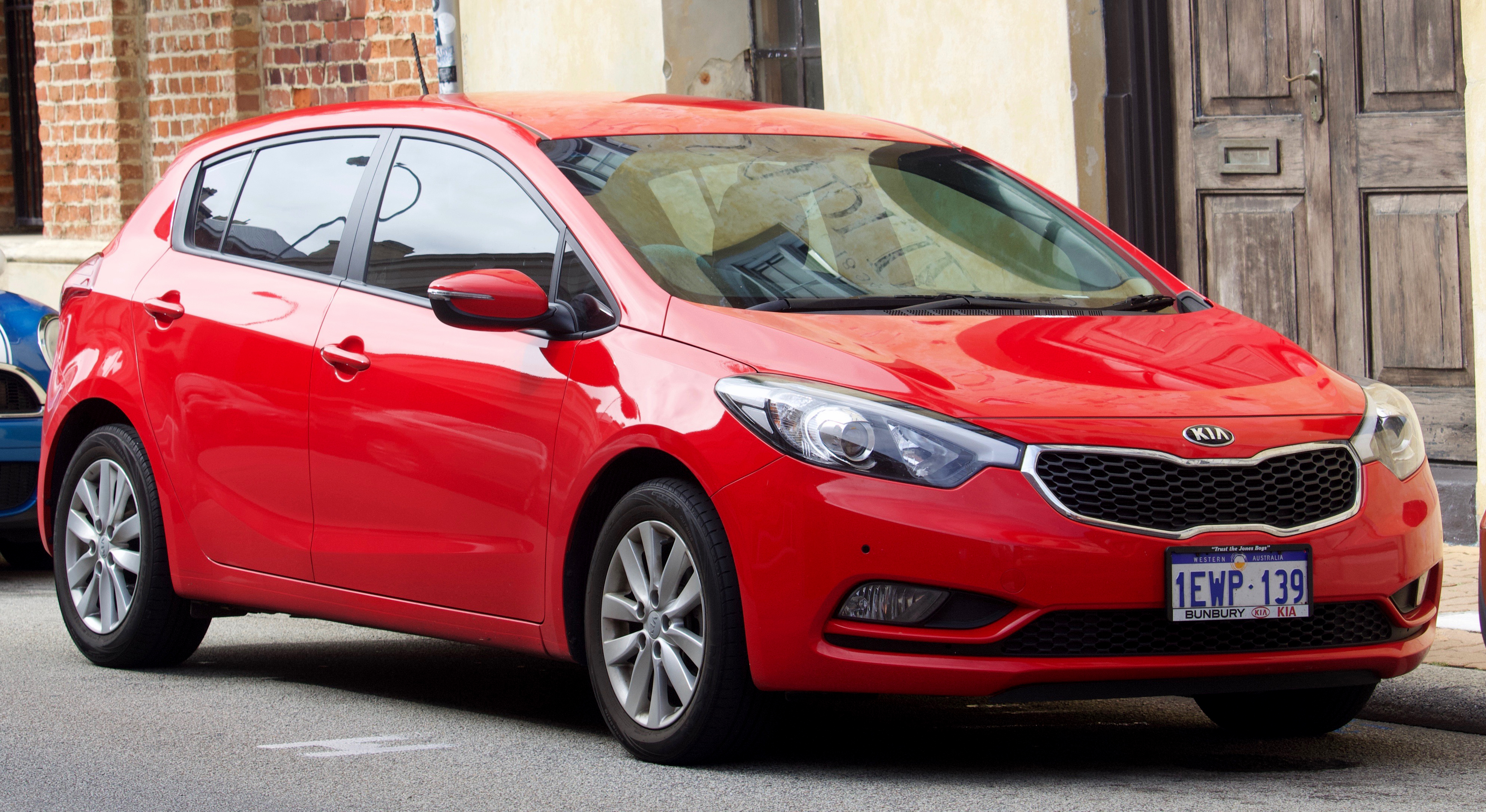
Pre-facelift Kia Cerato Si hatchback

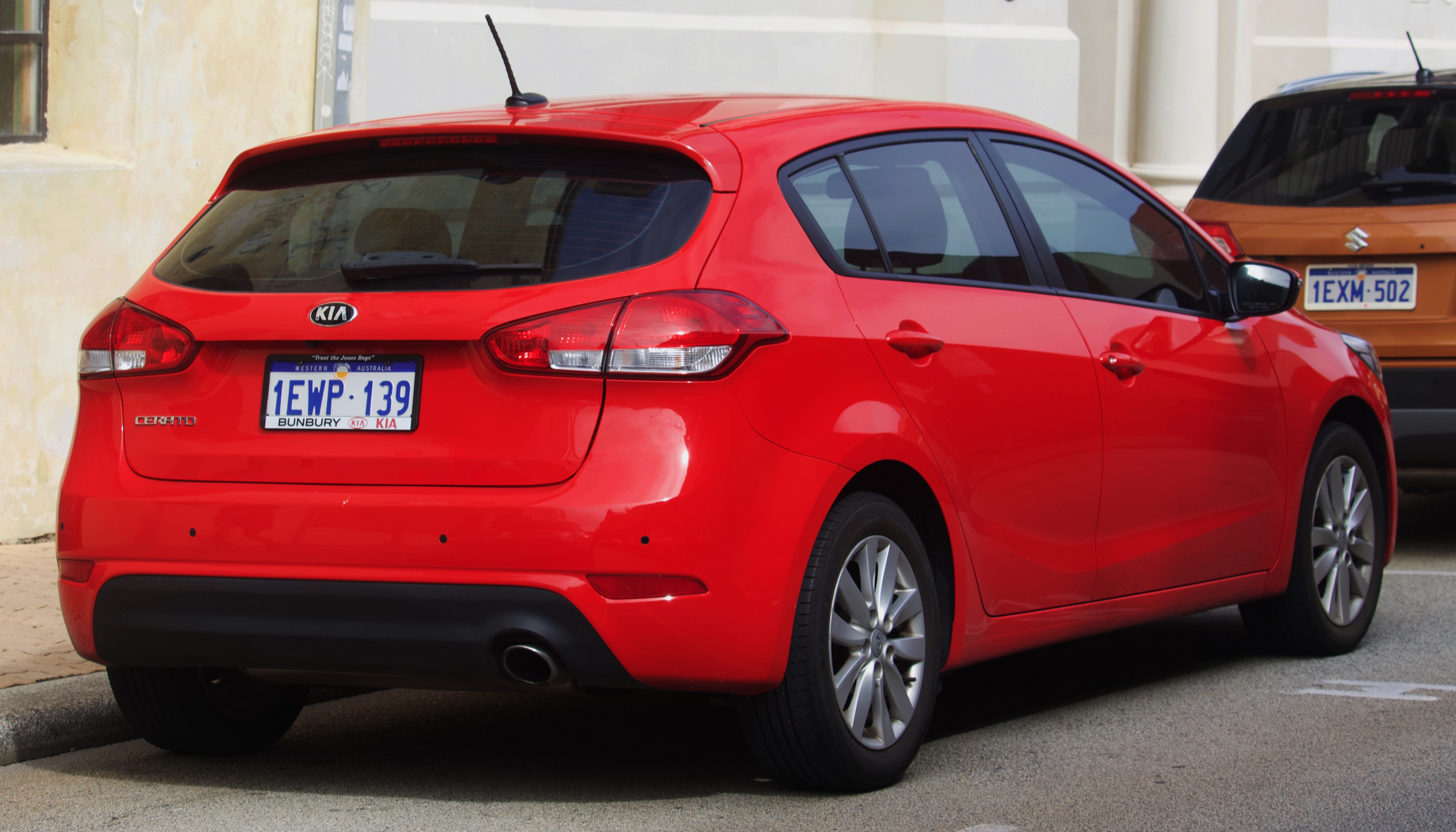
Pre-facelift Kia Cerato Si hatchback (rear)

=== Sedan ===
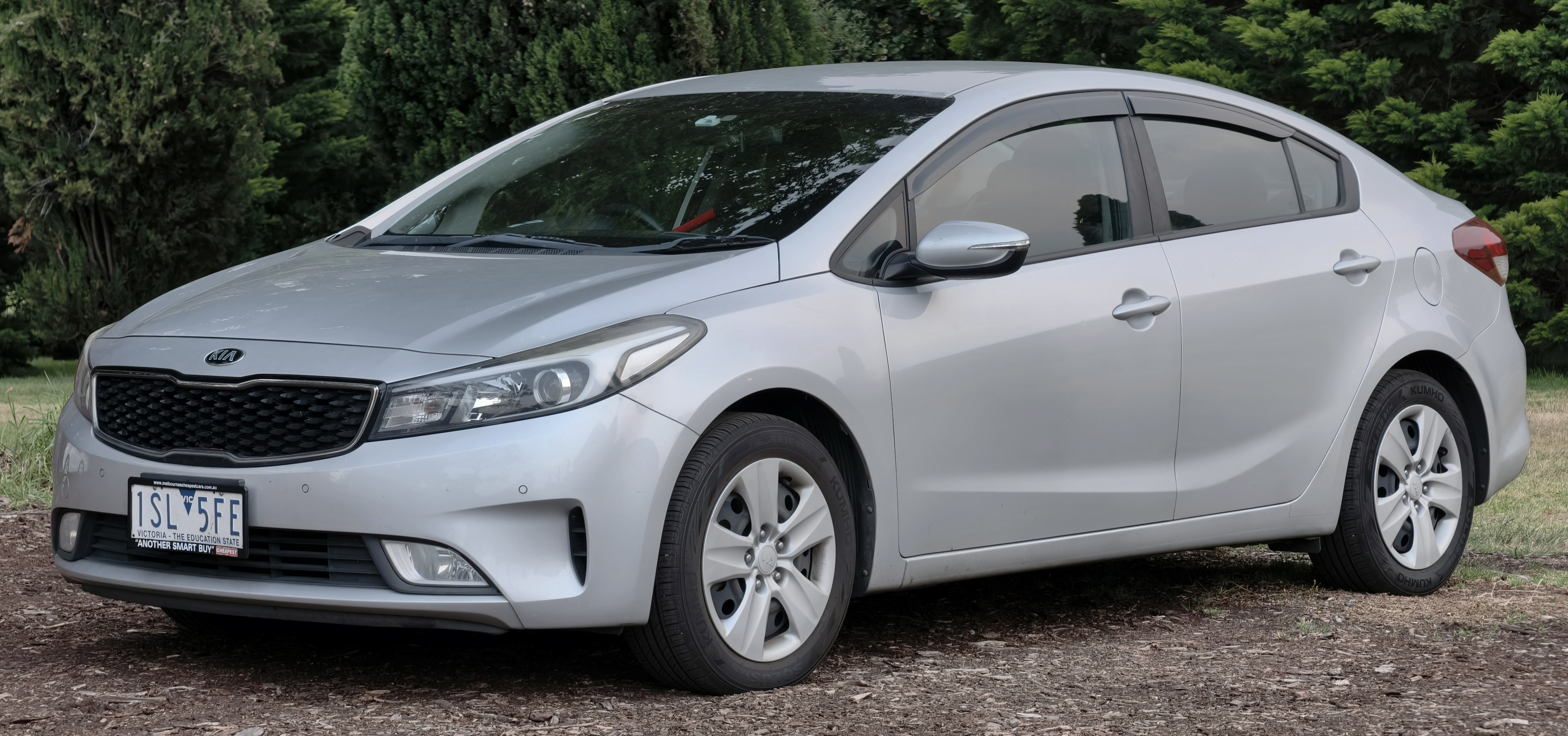
Facelift Kia Cerato S

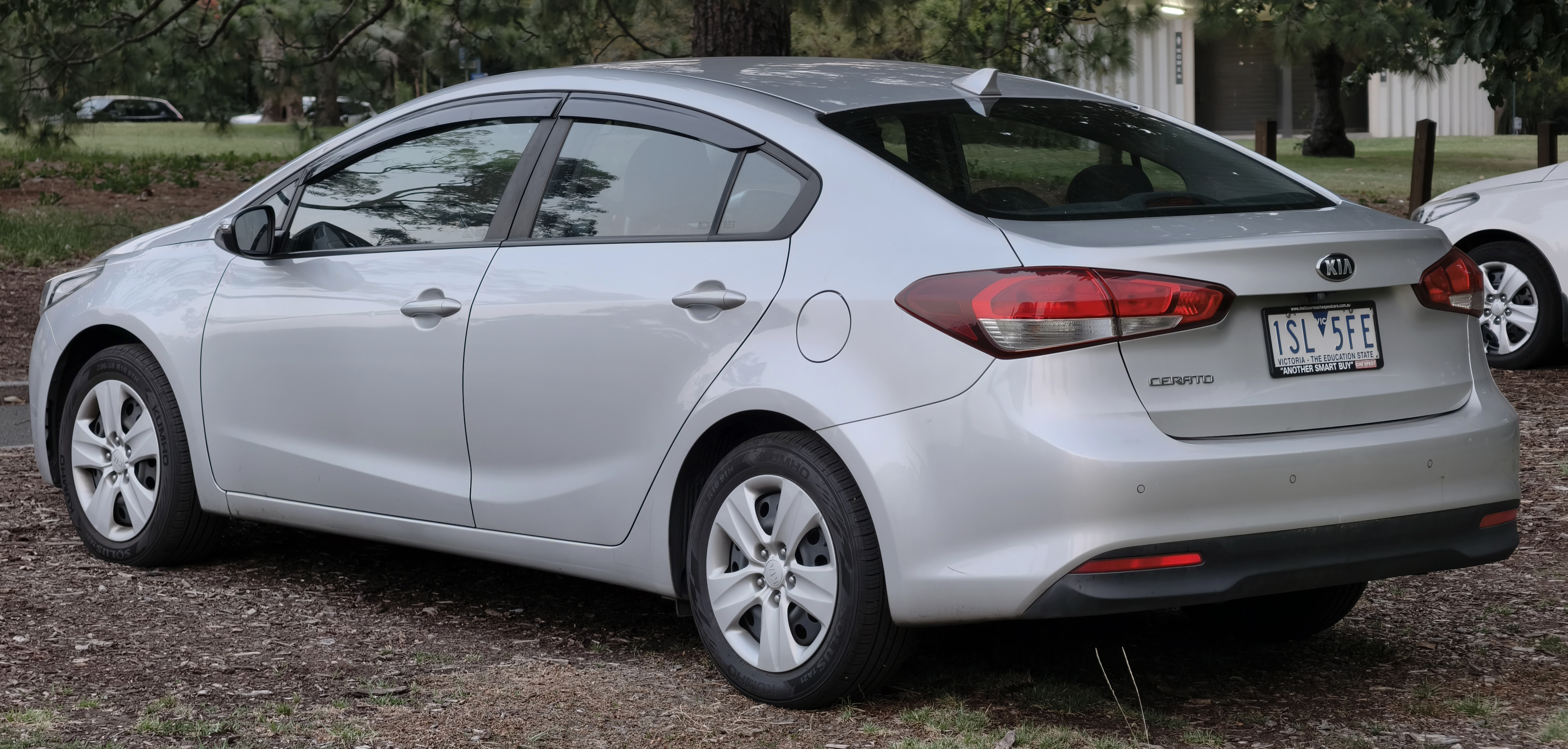
Facelift Kia Cerato S (rear)

=== Coupe ===
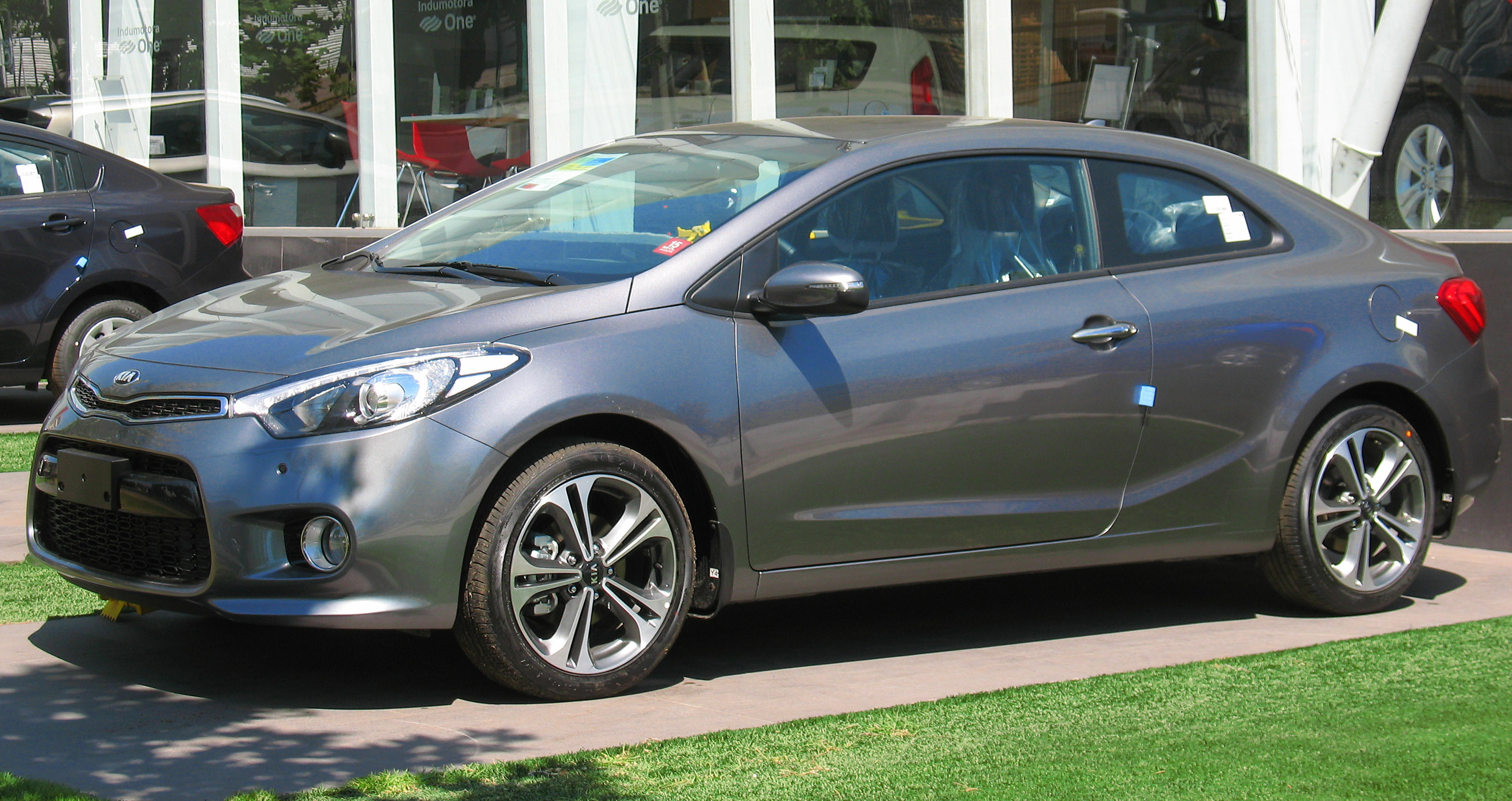
Kia Cerato Koup SX

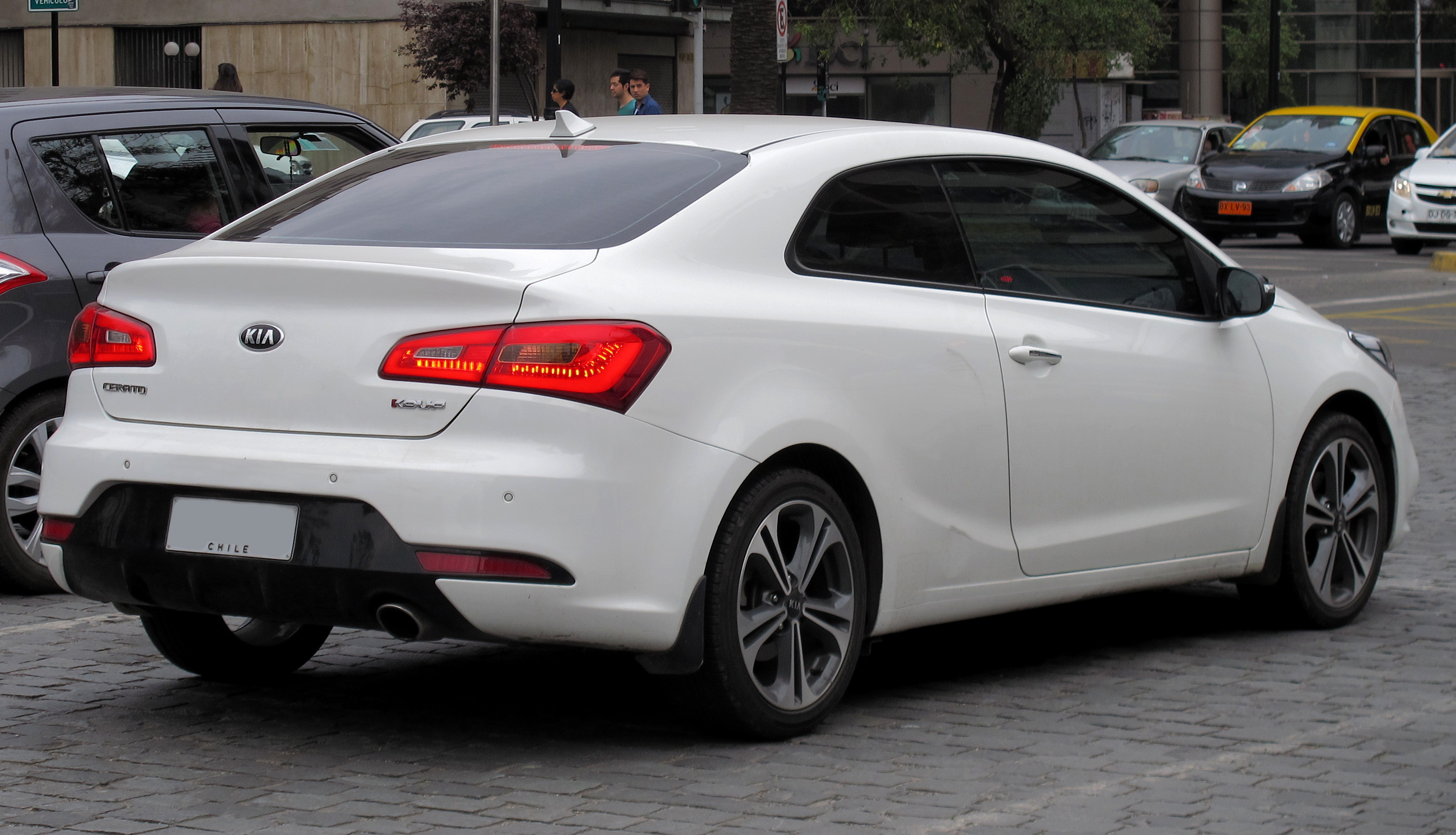
Kia Cerato Koup SX (rear)

== Fourth generation (BD; 2018) ==
The fourth generation Cerato was unveiled as the Forte on January 15, 2018 at the 2018 North American International Auto Show in Detroit, Michigan. Entering its third generation, the new car takes styling cues from the Stinger, and adopts a cab rearward exterior, resulting in a fastback profile and a short trunklid. The car is constructed with 54% advanced high-strength steel that is stronger than the outgoing model.

=== Hatchback ===
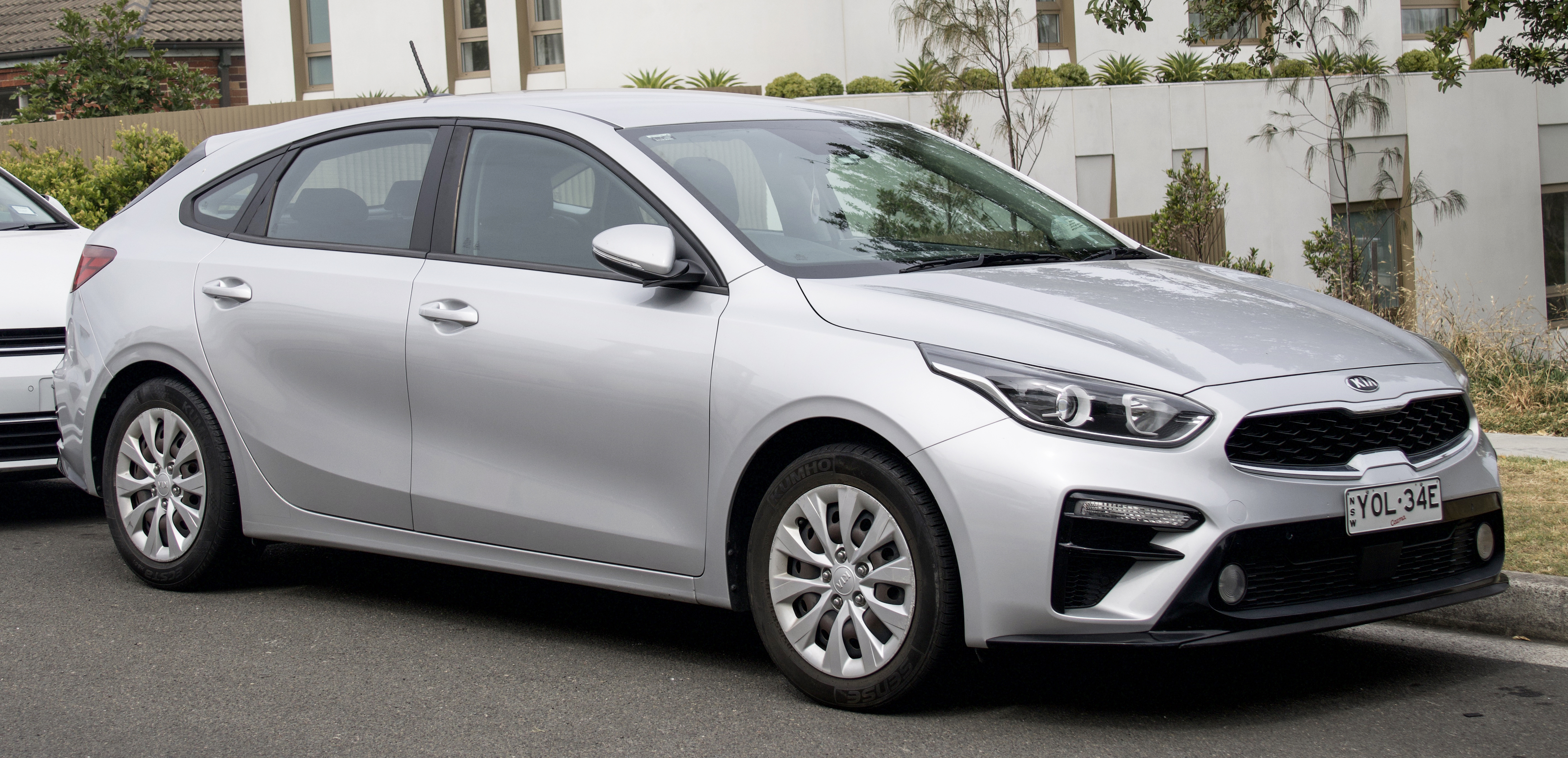
Kia Cerato S hatchback

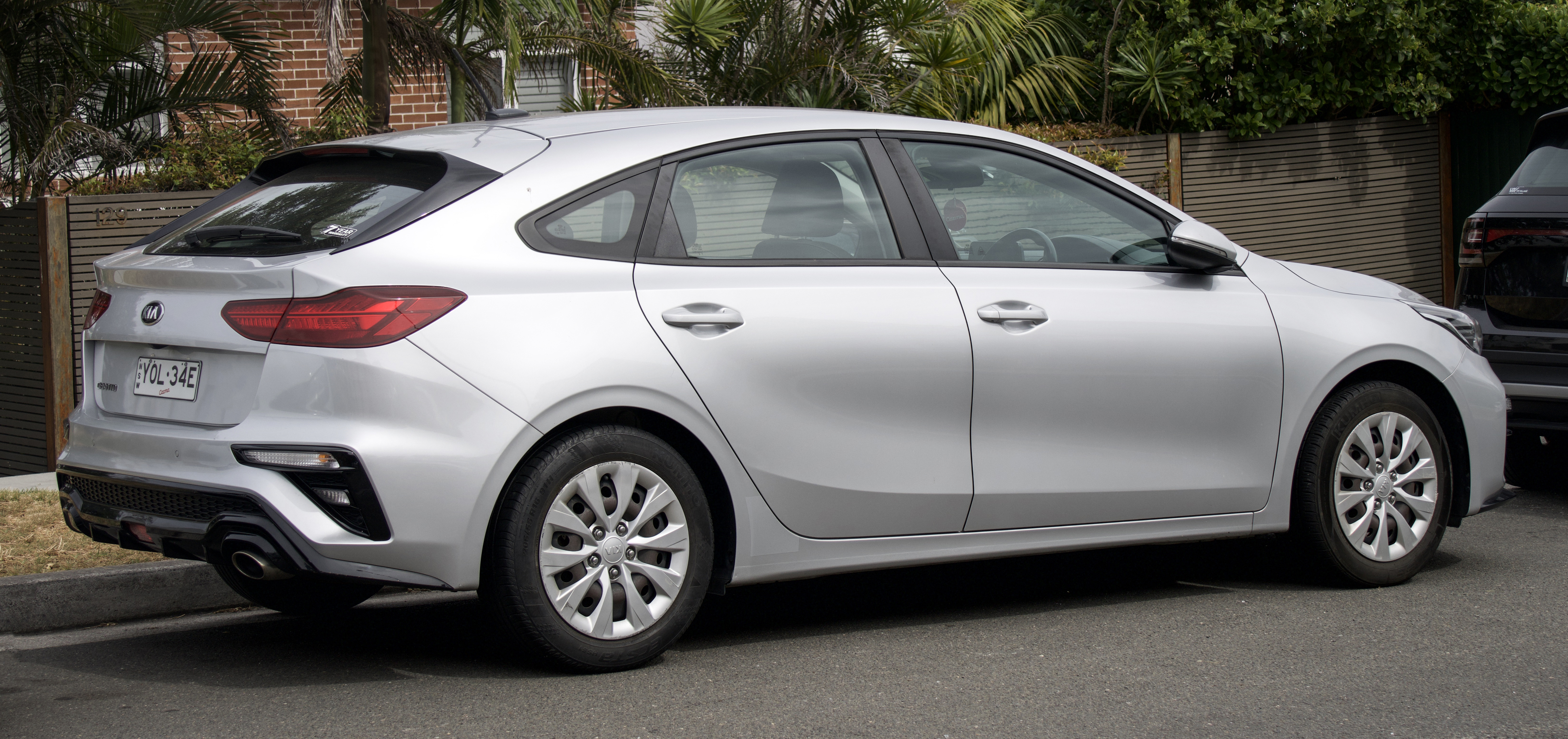
Kia Cerato S hatchback

=== Sedan ===
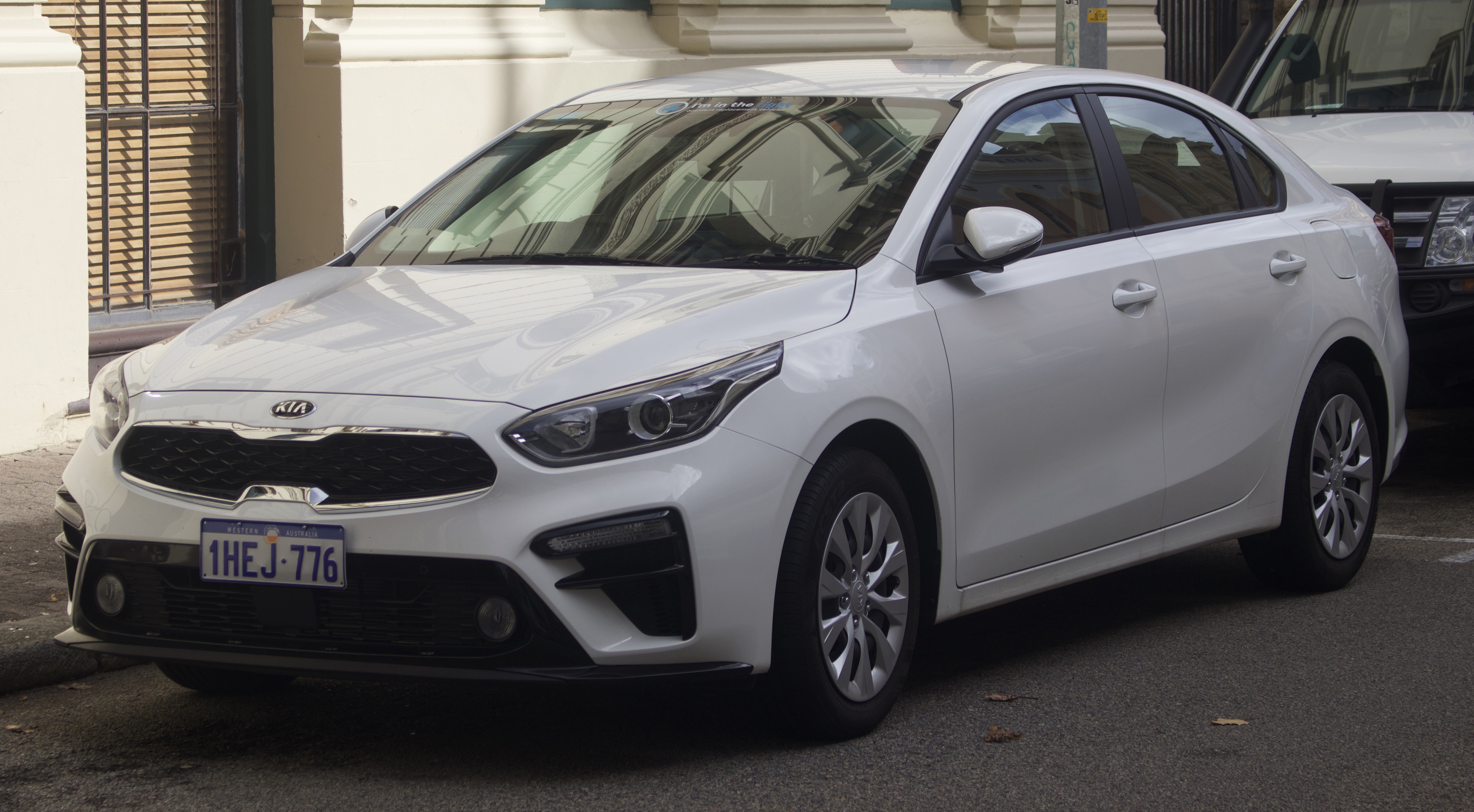
Kia cerato S Sedan

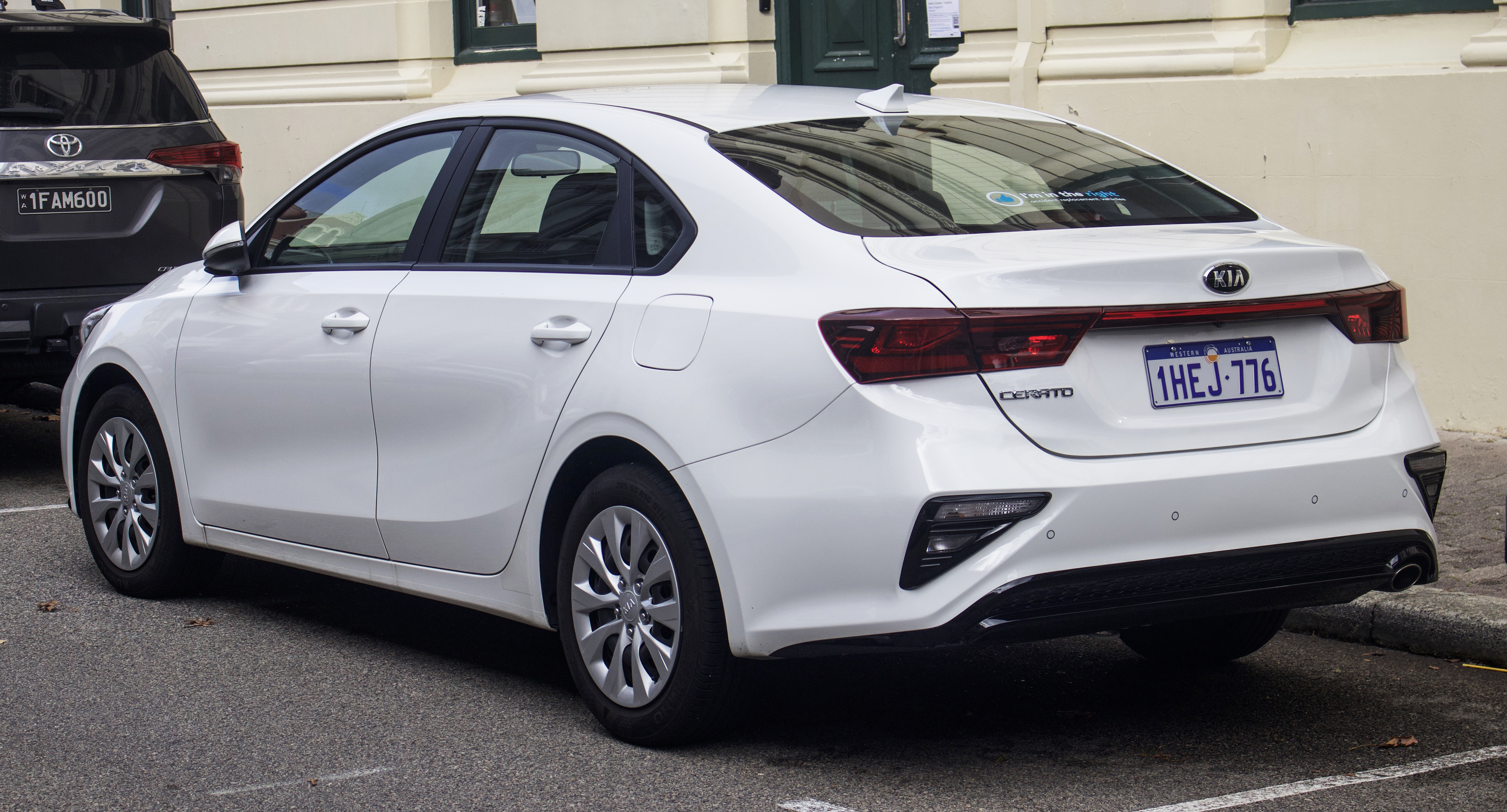
Kia Cerato S Sedan

== Sales ==
Calendar year	Vietnam
2016	2,696
2017	5,651
2018	11,710
2019	11,313
2020	12,033
