= Hyundai-Kia J platforms =

Overview
- Manufacturer: Hyundai; Kia Motors
- Production: 1995–present

Body and chassis
- Class: Compact car (C)
- Layout: Front-engine, front-wheel-drive; Front-engine, all-wheel-drive
- Platform: J1, J2/J3, HD, J6

Chronology
- Successor: Hyundai-Kia K2 platform; Hyundai-Kia K3 platform

The J platform series are platforms developed by Hyundai and Kia for its range of compact (C-segment) automobiles since 1995.

== J2/J3 platform ==
- Hyundai Elantra (RD/RD2) (1995–2000)
- Hyundai Tiburon/Coupe (RD/RD2) (1996–2000)
- Hyundai Elantra/Avante (XD) (2000–2006)
- Hyundai Matrix/Lavita (FC) (2001–2010)
- Hyundai Tiburon/Coupe II (GK) (2001–2008)
- Hyundai Tucson (JM) (2004–2009)
- Kia Cerato/Spectra (LD) (2004–2009)
- Kia Sportage (JE) (2004–2010)
- Kia Carens/Rondo (UN) (2006–2013, hybrid between J2/J3 and NF/CM platforms)

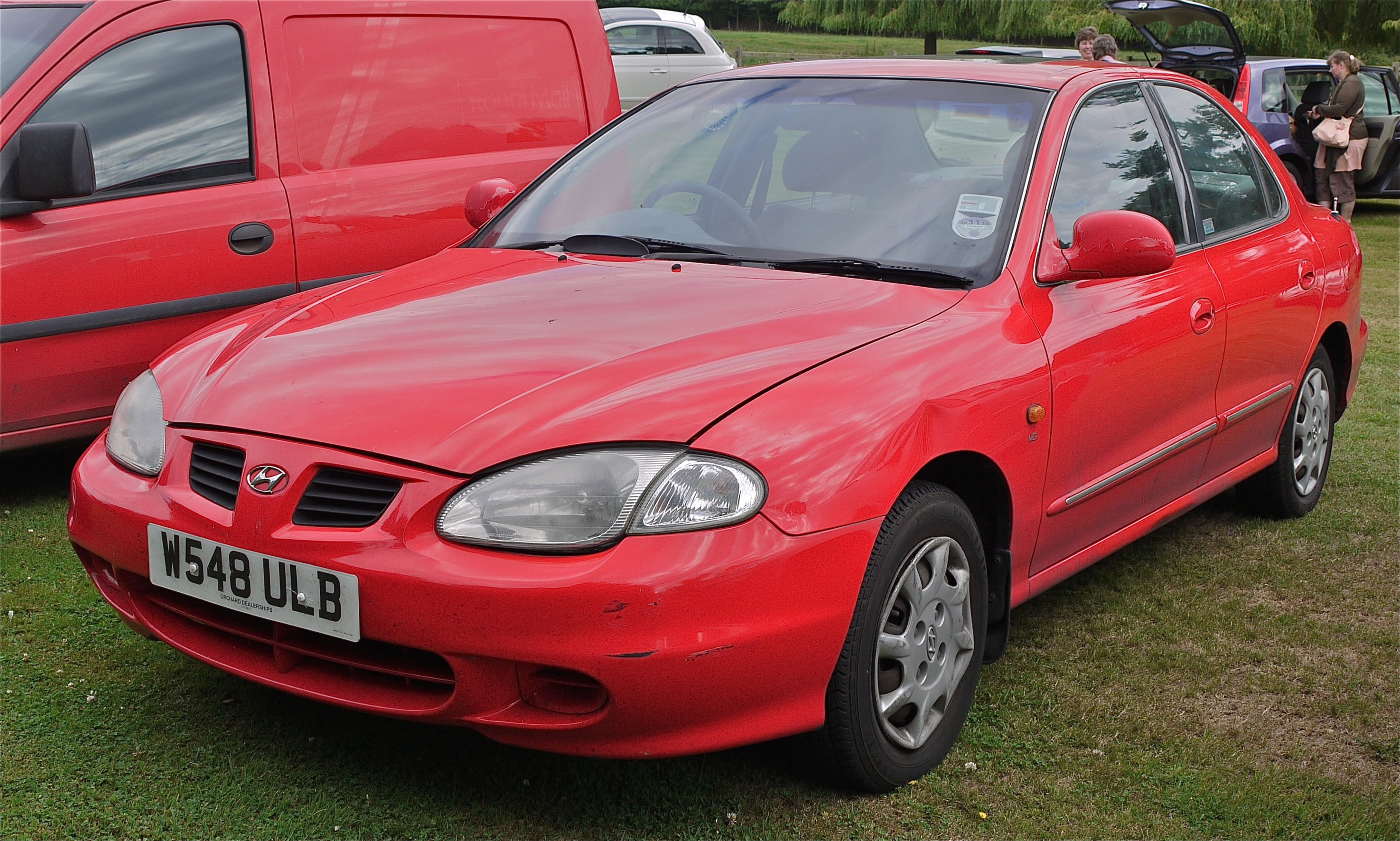
Hyundai Elantra (RD/RD2)

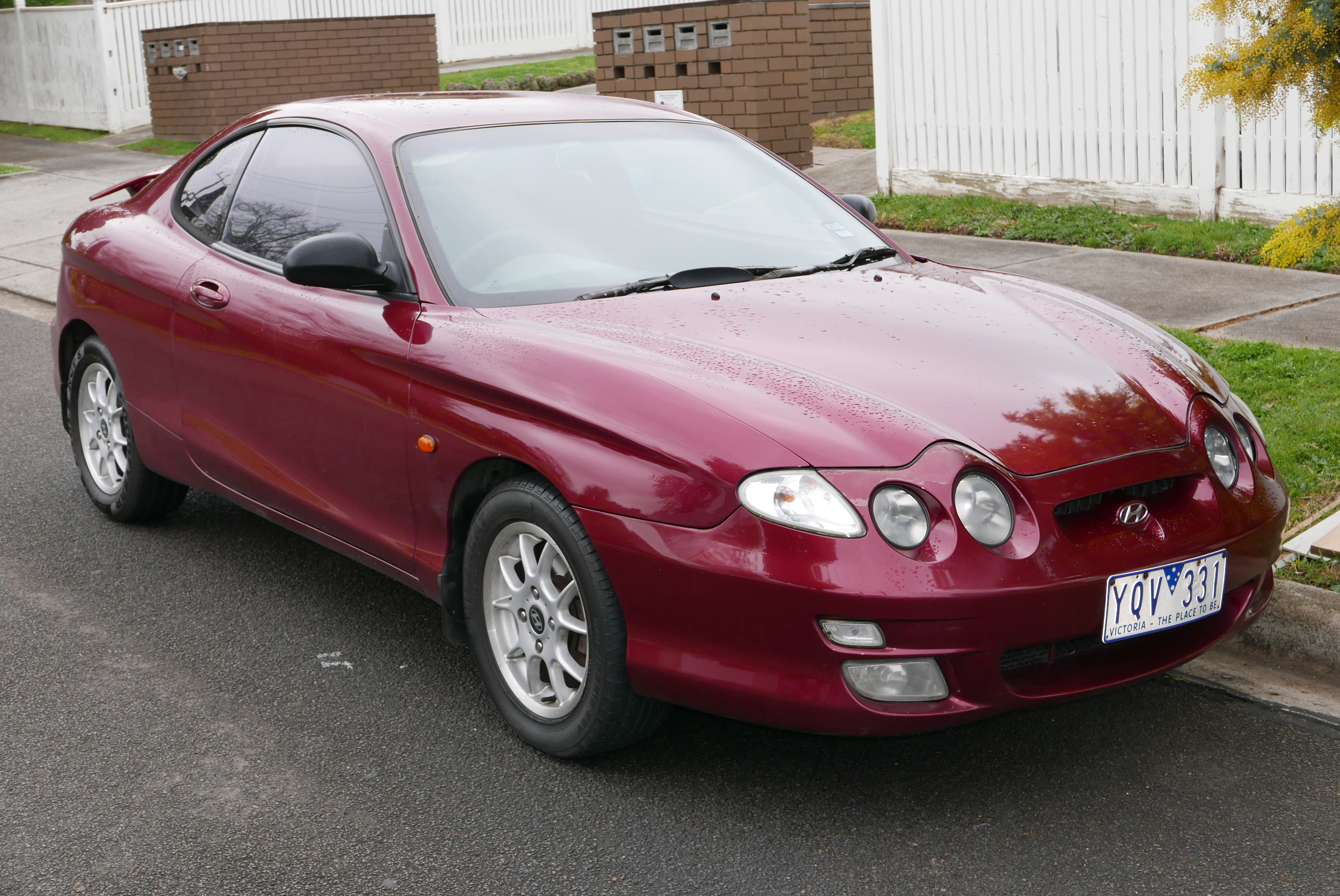
Hyundai Tiburon/Coupe (RD/RD2)

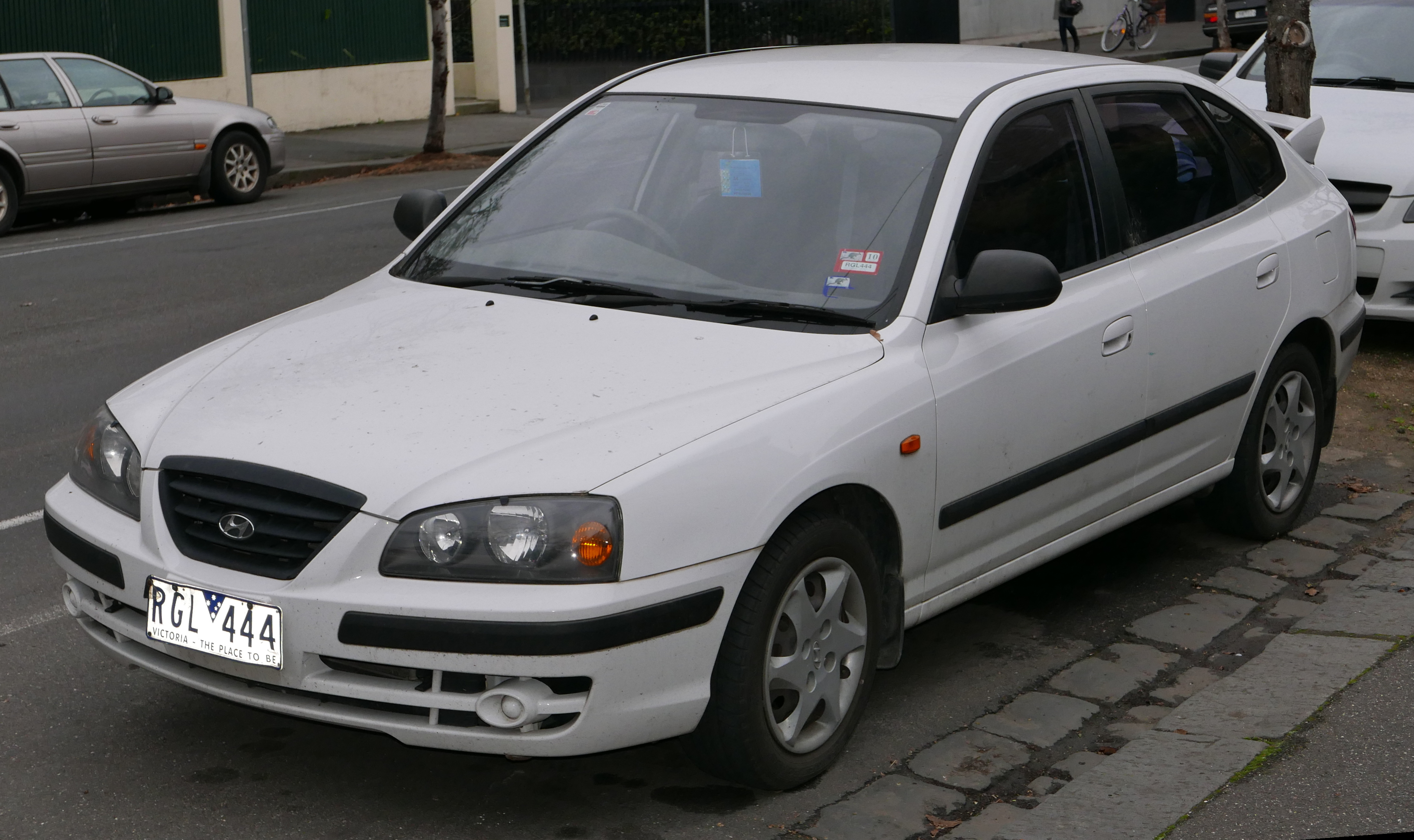
Hyundai Elantra/Avante (XD)

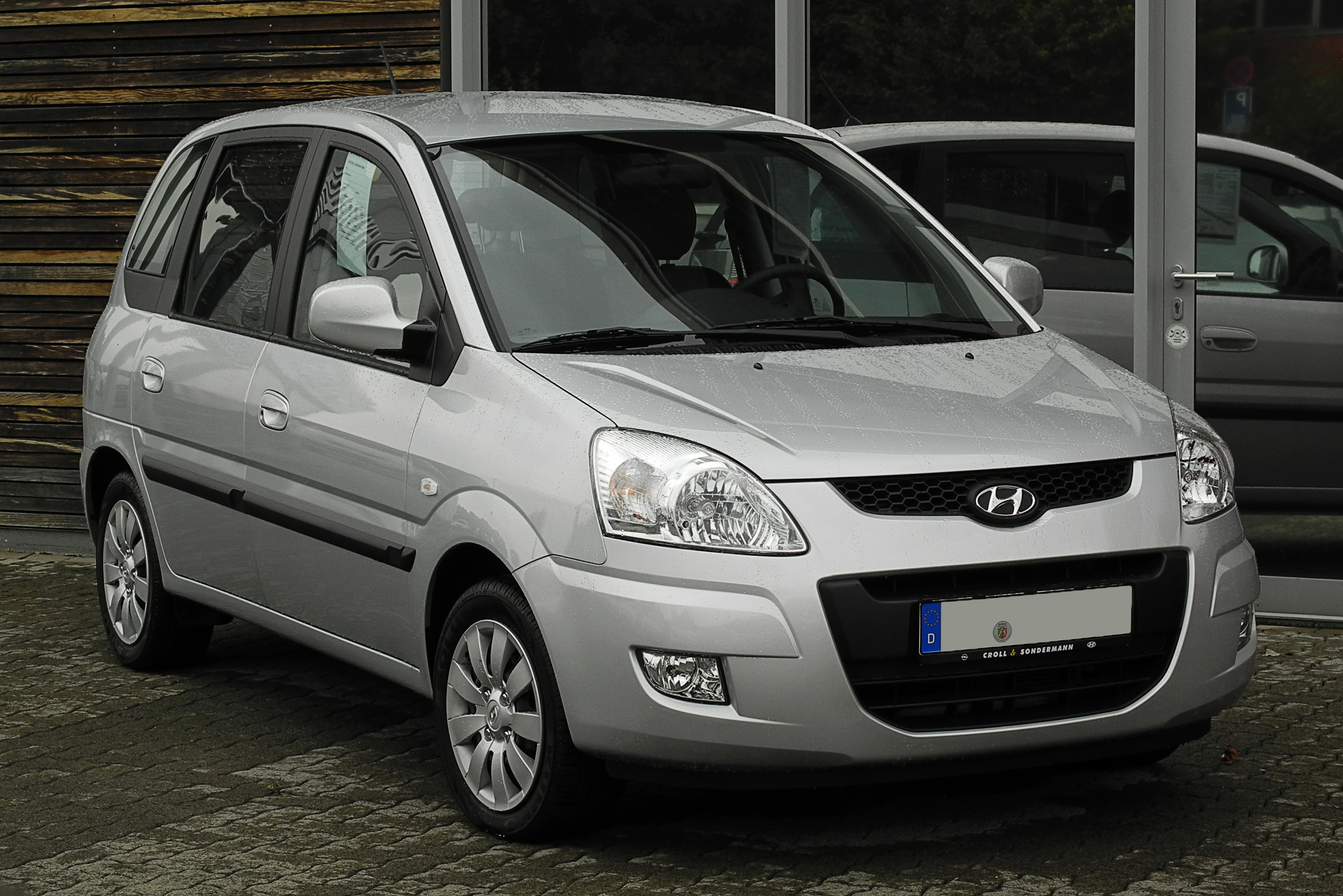
Hyundai Matrix/Lavita (FC)

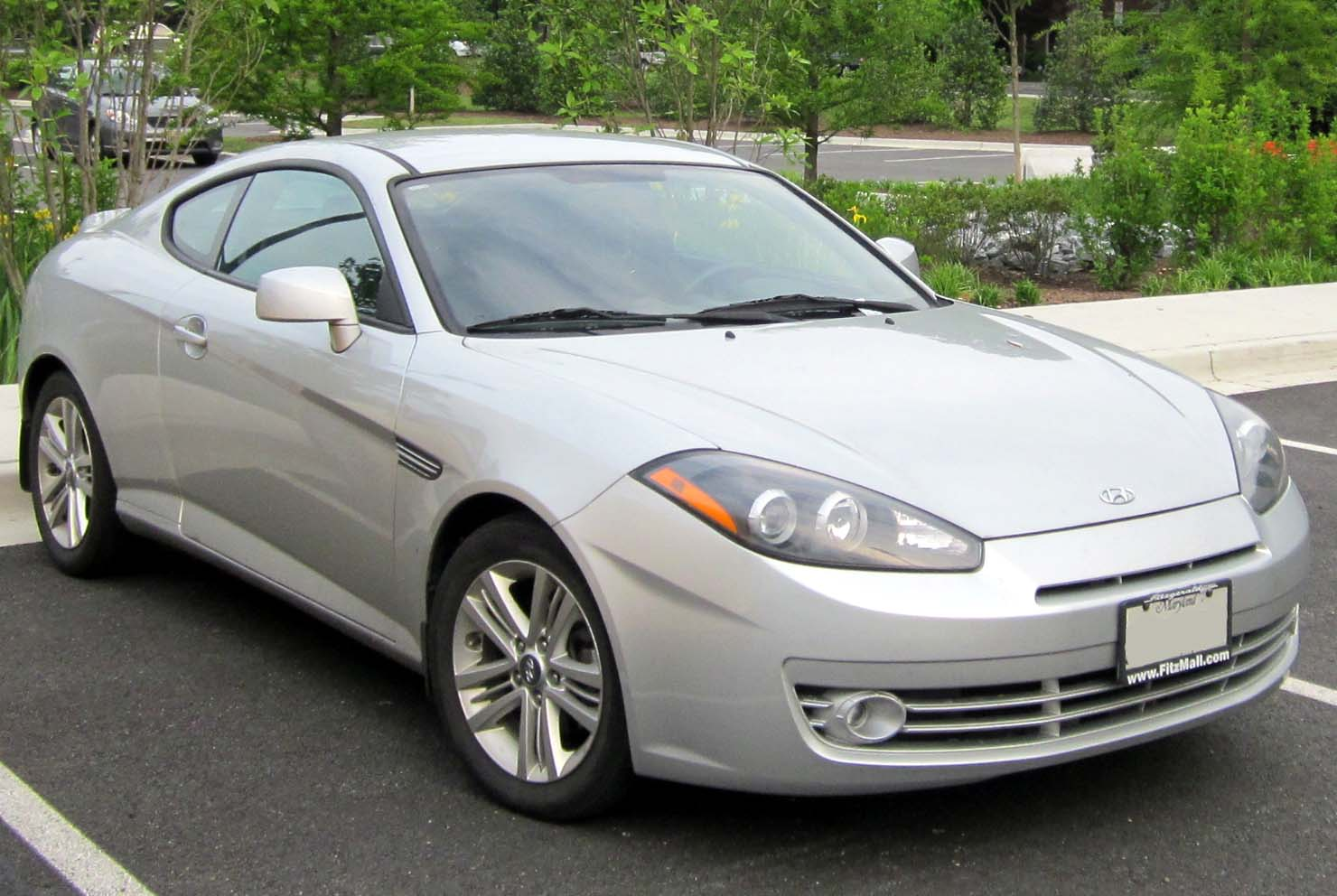
Hyundai Tiburon/Coupe II (GK)

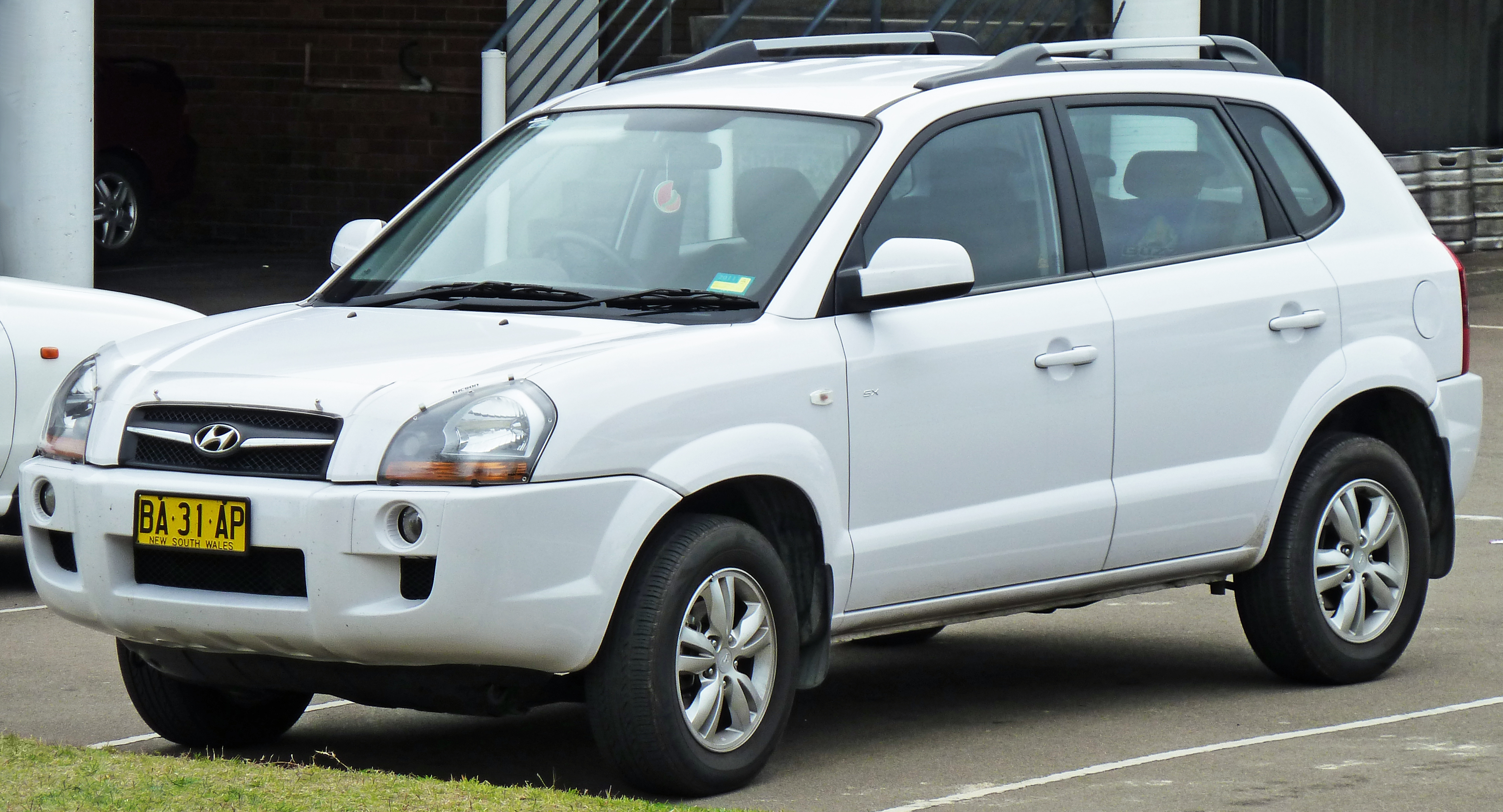
Hyundai Tucson (JM)

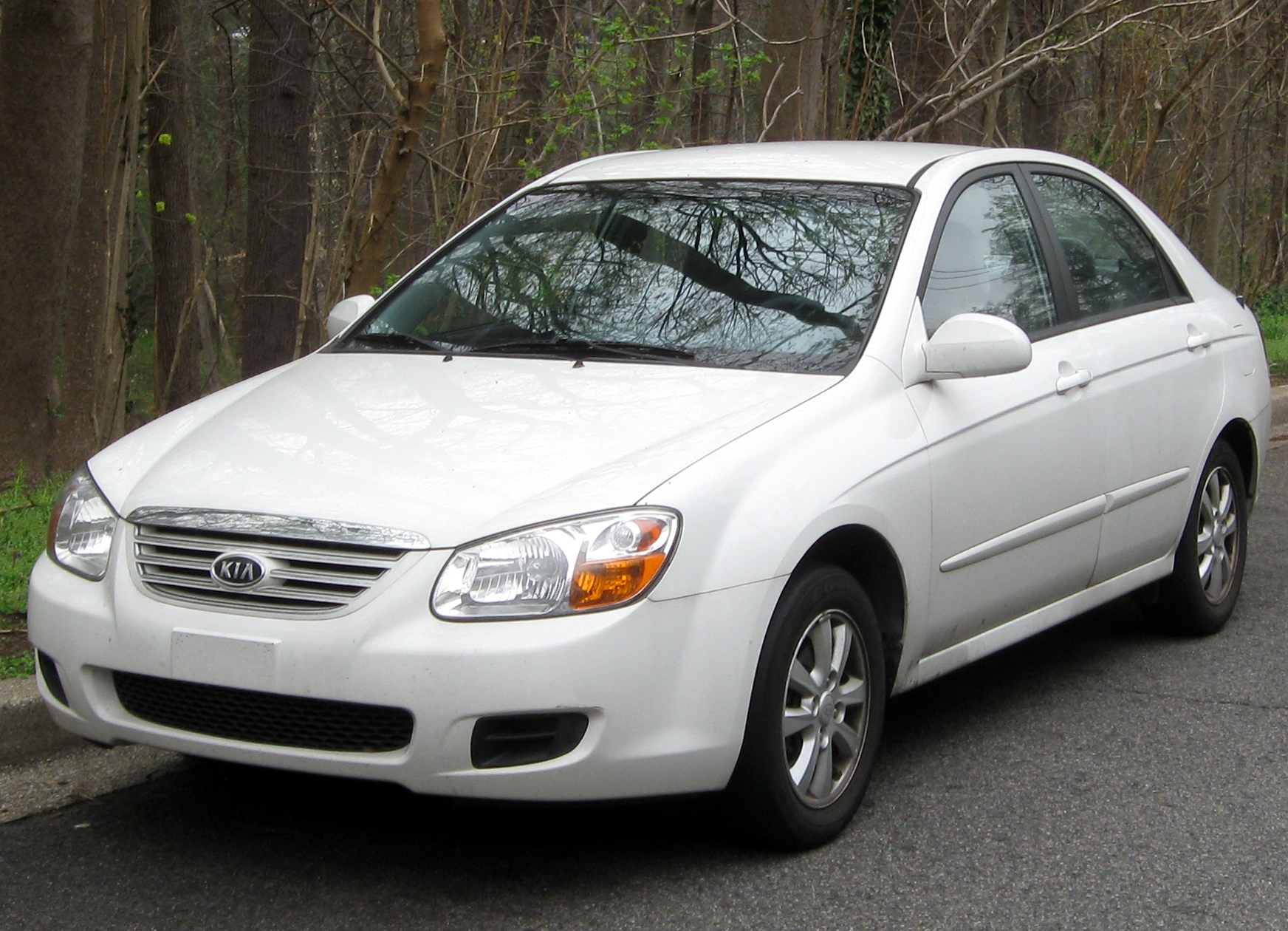
Kia Cerato/Spectra (LD)

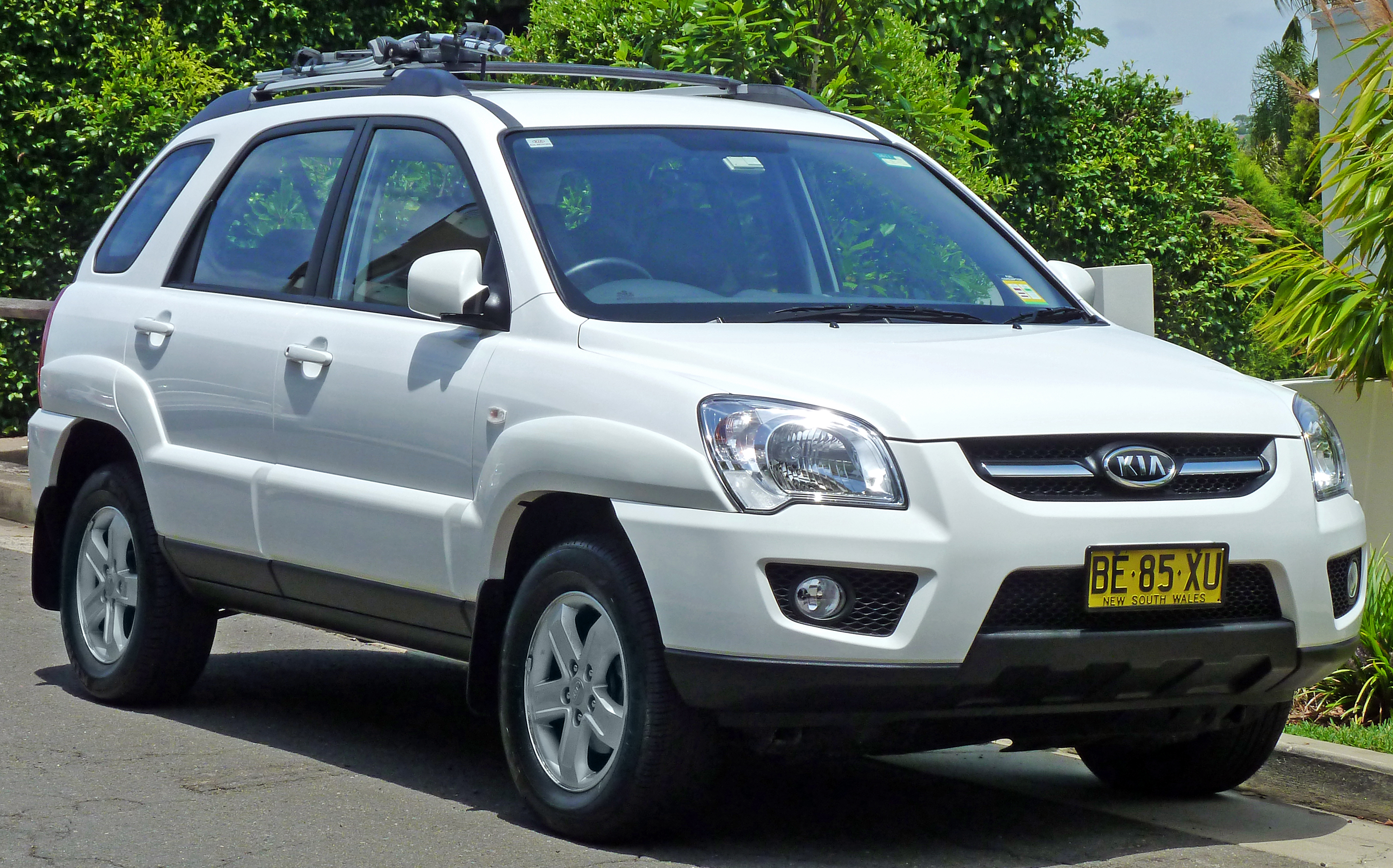
Kia Sportage (JE)

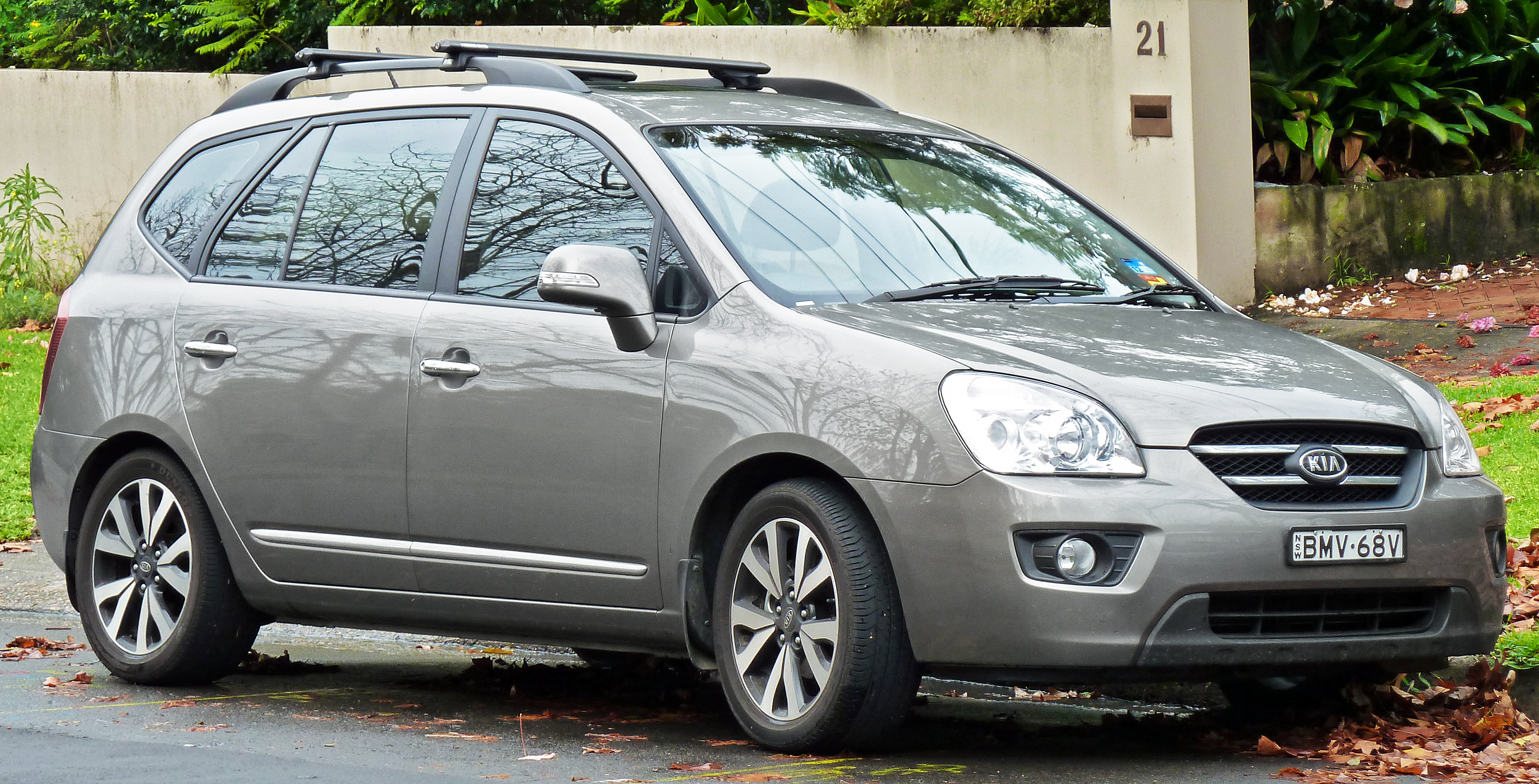
Kia Carens/Rondo (UN)

== HD (J4/J5) platform ==
- Hyundai Elantra/Avante (HD) (2006–2010)
- Hyundai i30 (FD) (2007–2011)
- Kia Cee'd (ED) (2006–2012)
- Kia Forte/Cerato (TD) (2008–2013)
- Hyundai Elantra/Avante (MD) (2010–2016)
- Hyundai i30/Elantra GT (GD) (2011–2017)
- Hyundai Tucson/ix35 (LM) (2009–2015)
- Hyundai ix35 (NU) (2017–2023)
- Kia Sportage (SL) (2010–2015)
- Kia Sportage (NP) (2018–present)
- Kia Carens/Rondo (RP) (hybrid J5/Y6 platform) (2012–2022)
- Kia Cee'd (JD) (2012–2018)
- Kia Forte/Cerato (YD) (2012–2018)
- Kia Soul (PS) (2014–2019)

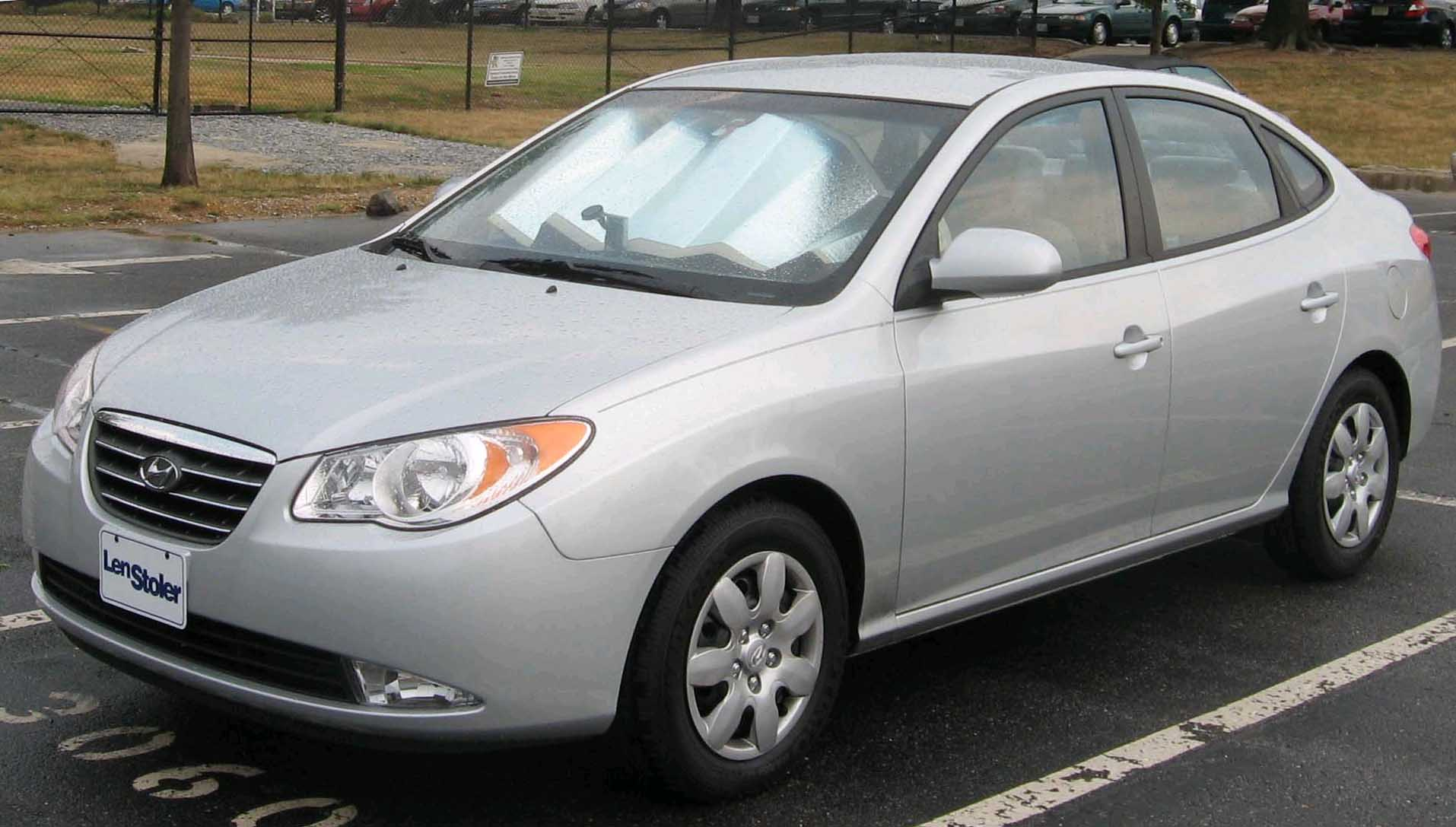
Hyundai Elantra/Avante (HD)

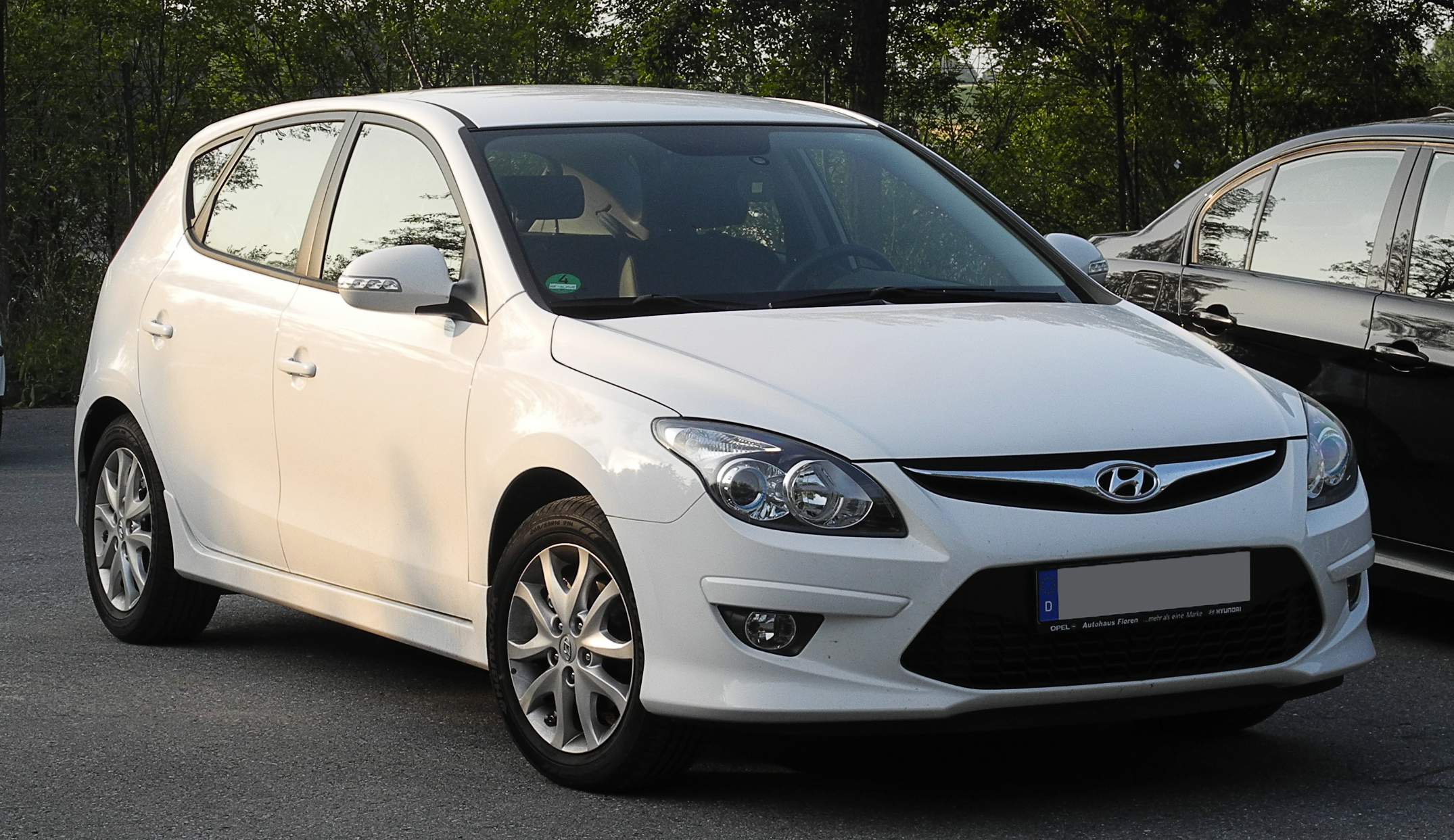
Hyundai i30 (FD)

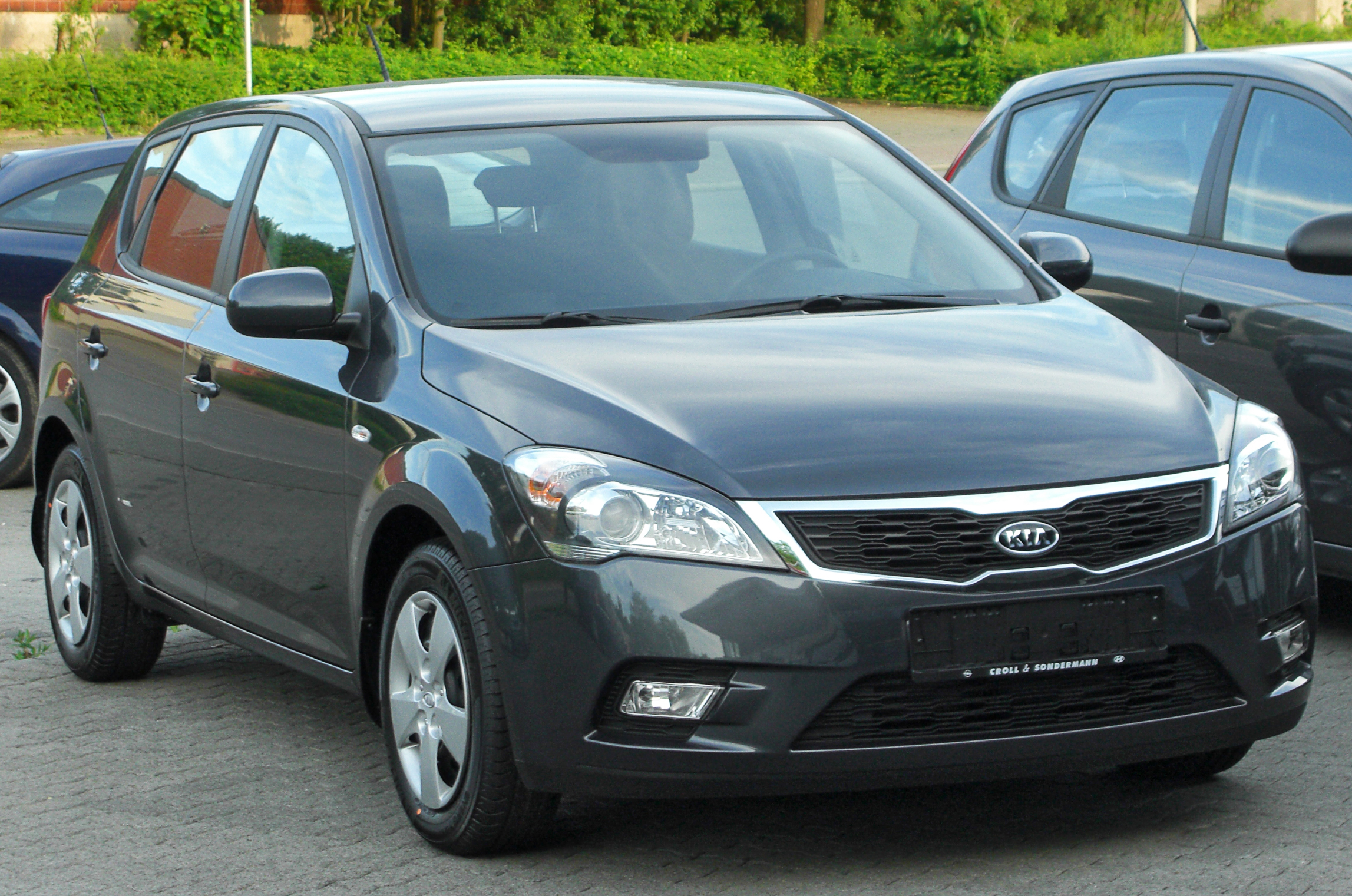
Kia Cee'd (ED)

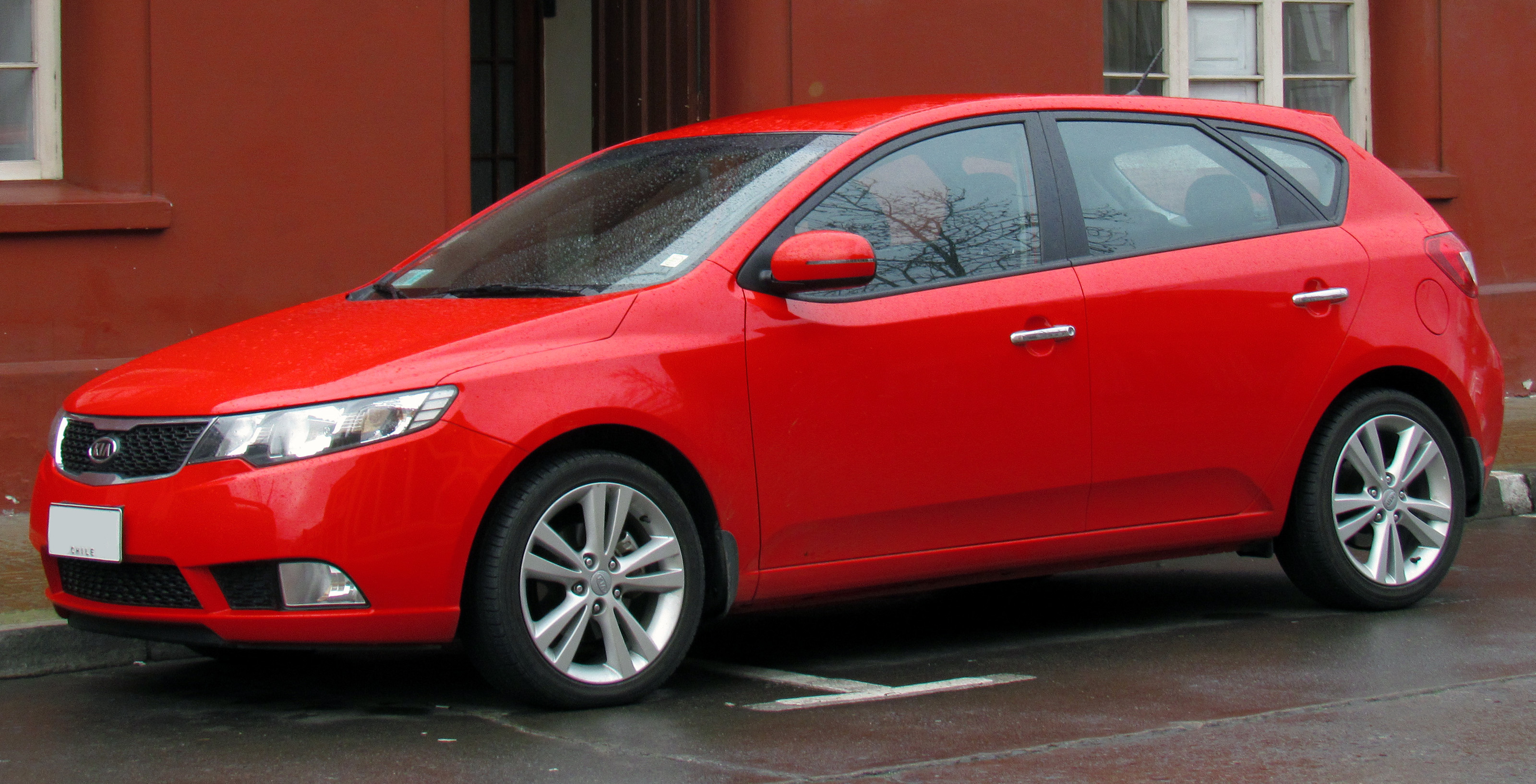
Kia Forte/Cerato (TD)

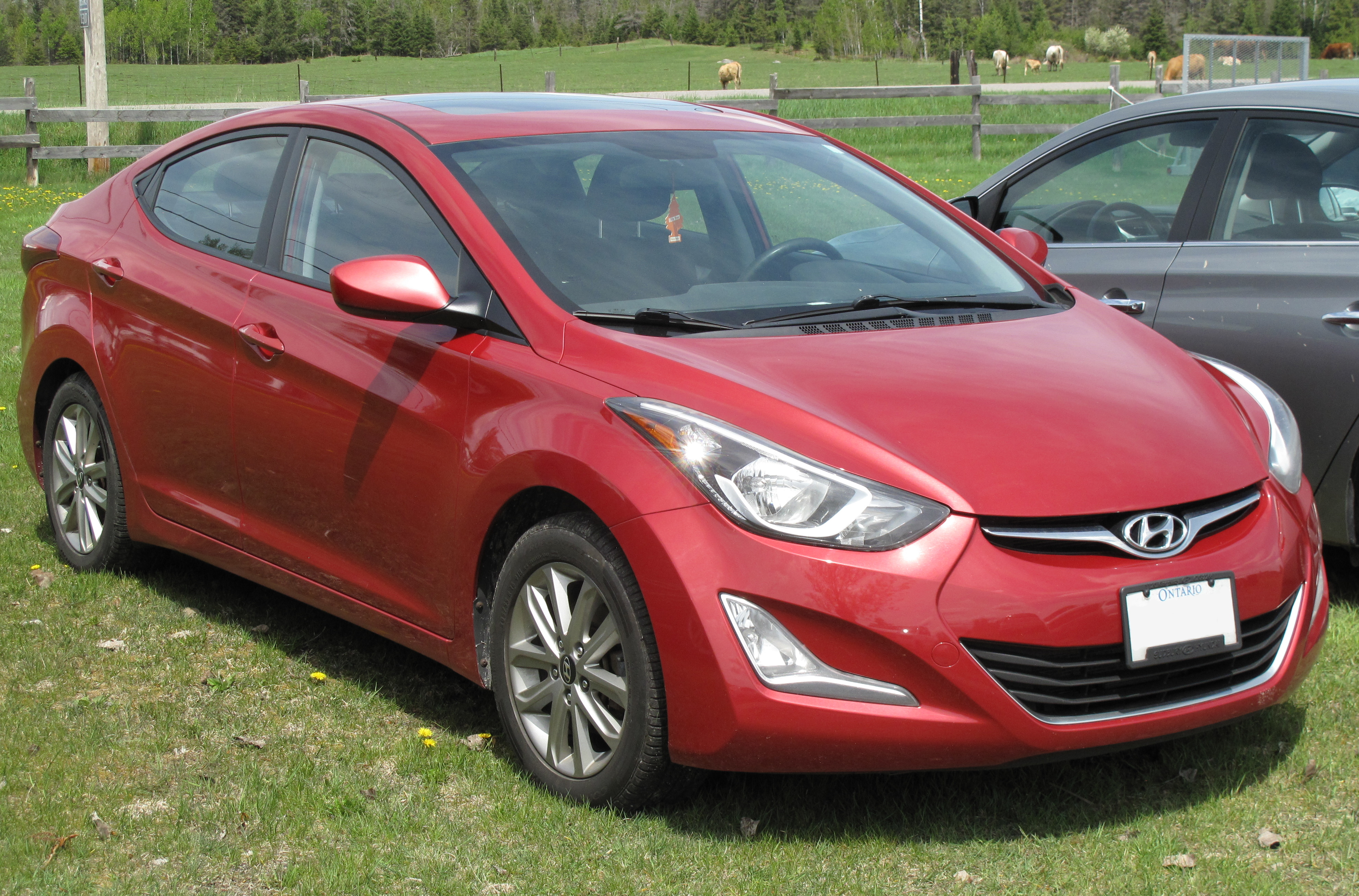
Hyundai Elantra/Avante (MD)

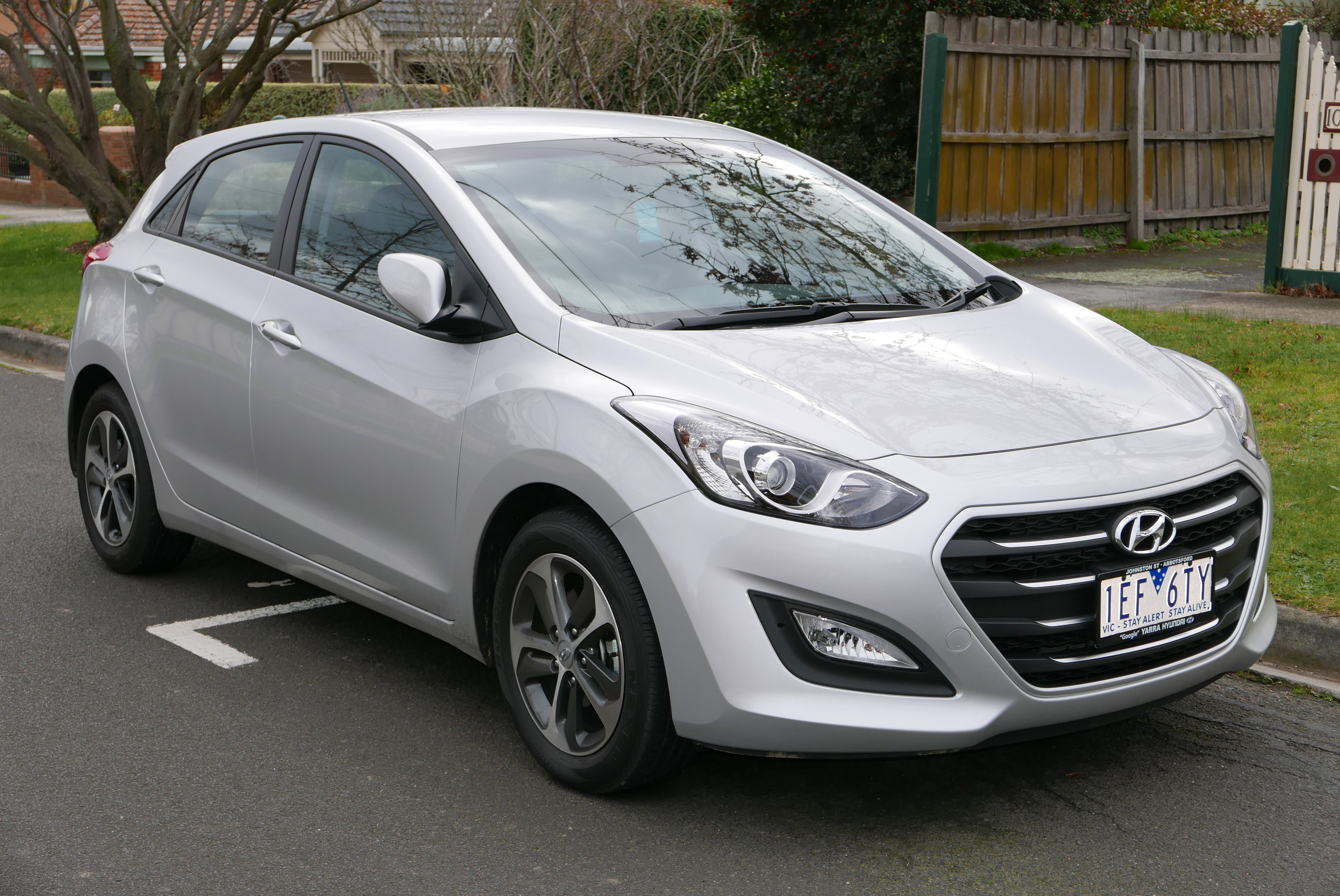
Hyundai i30/Elantra GT (GD)

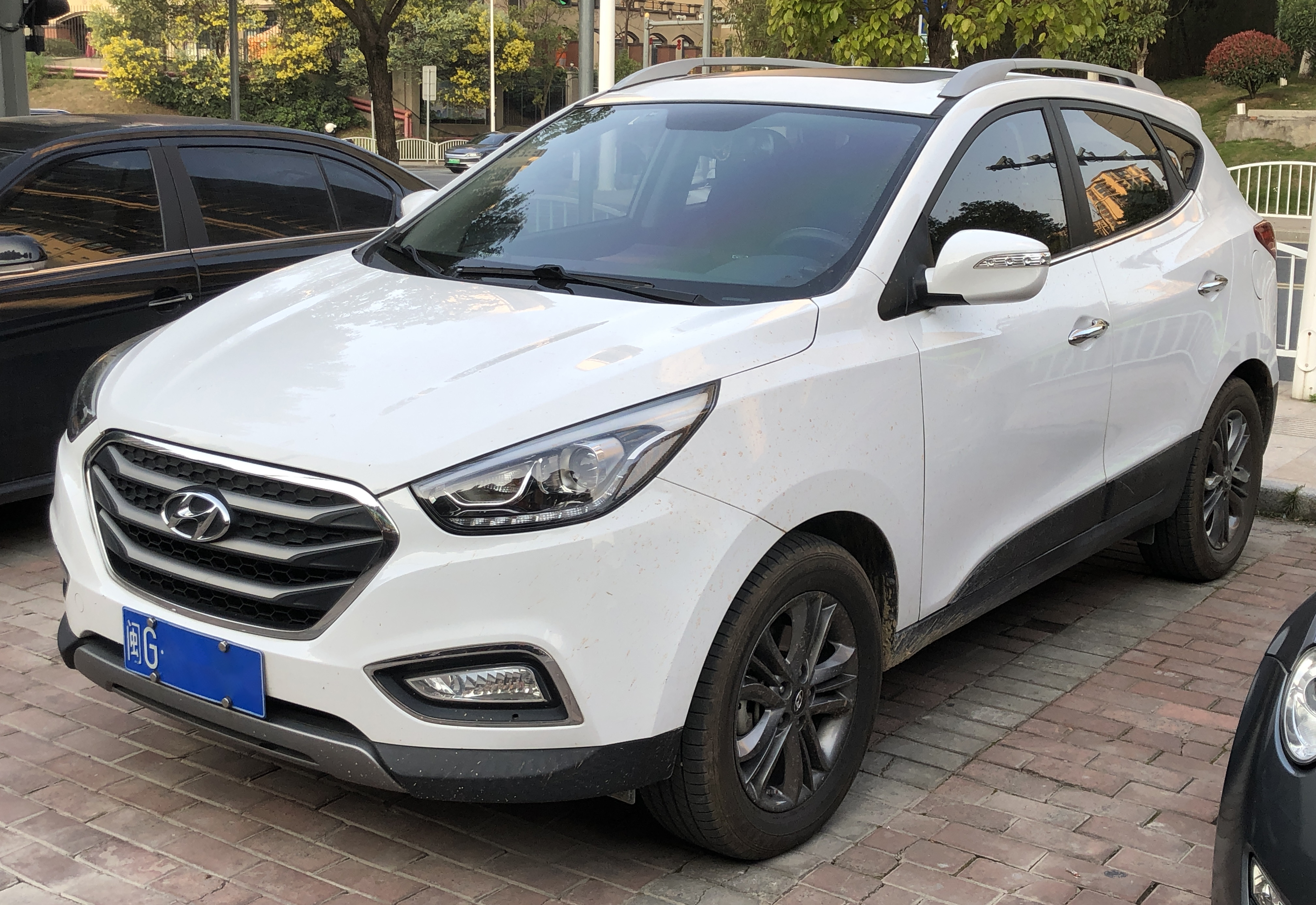
Hyundai Tucson/ix35 (LM)

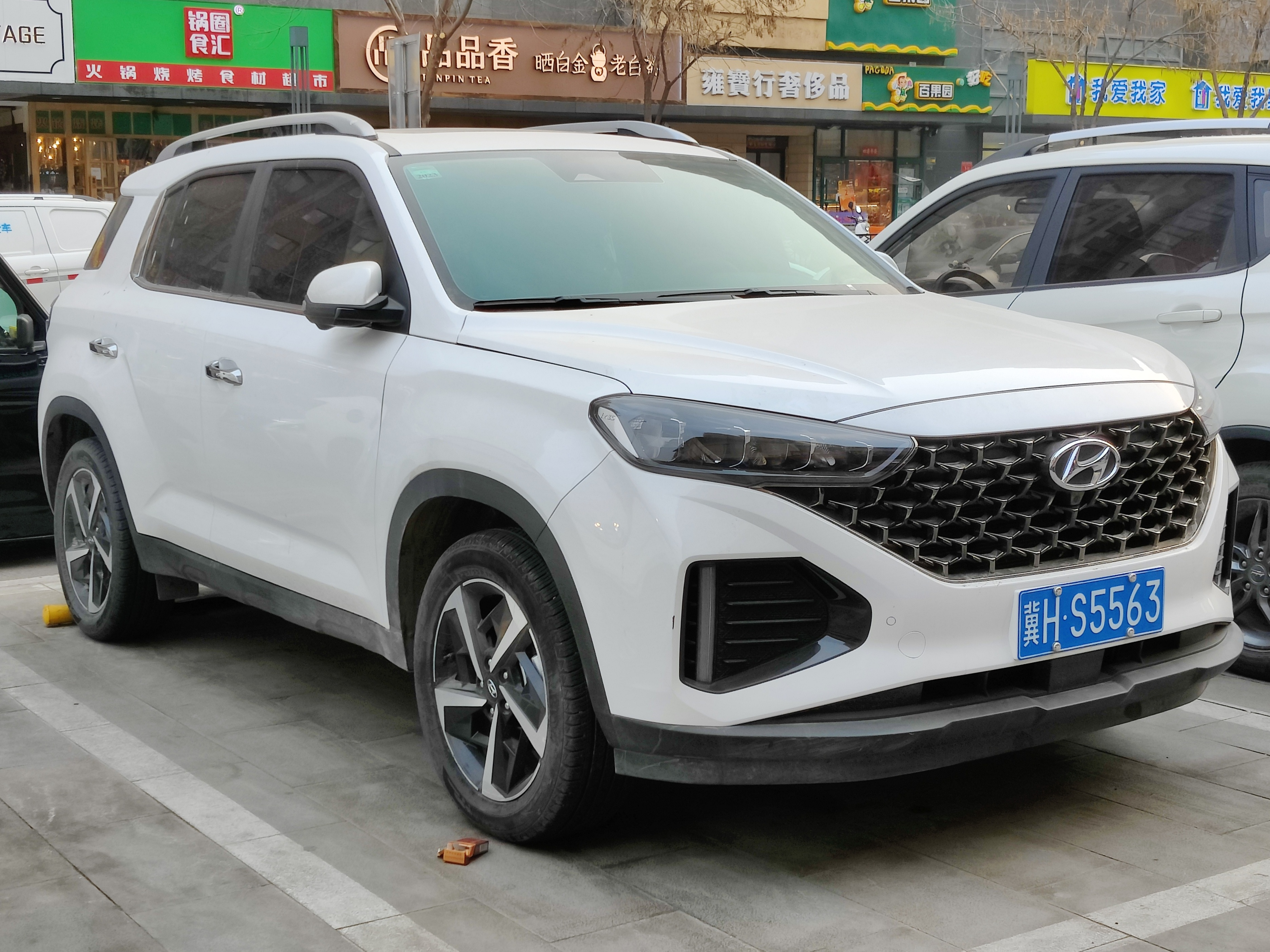
Hyundai ix35 (NU)

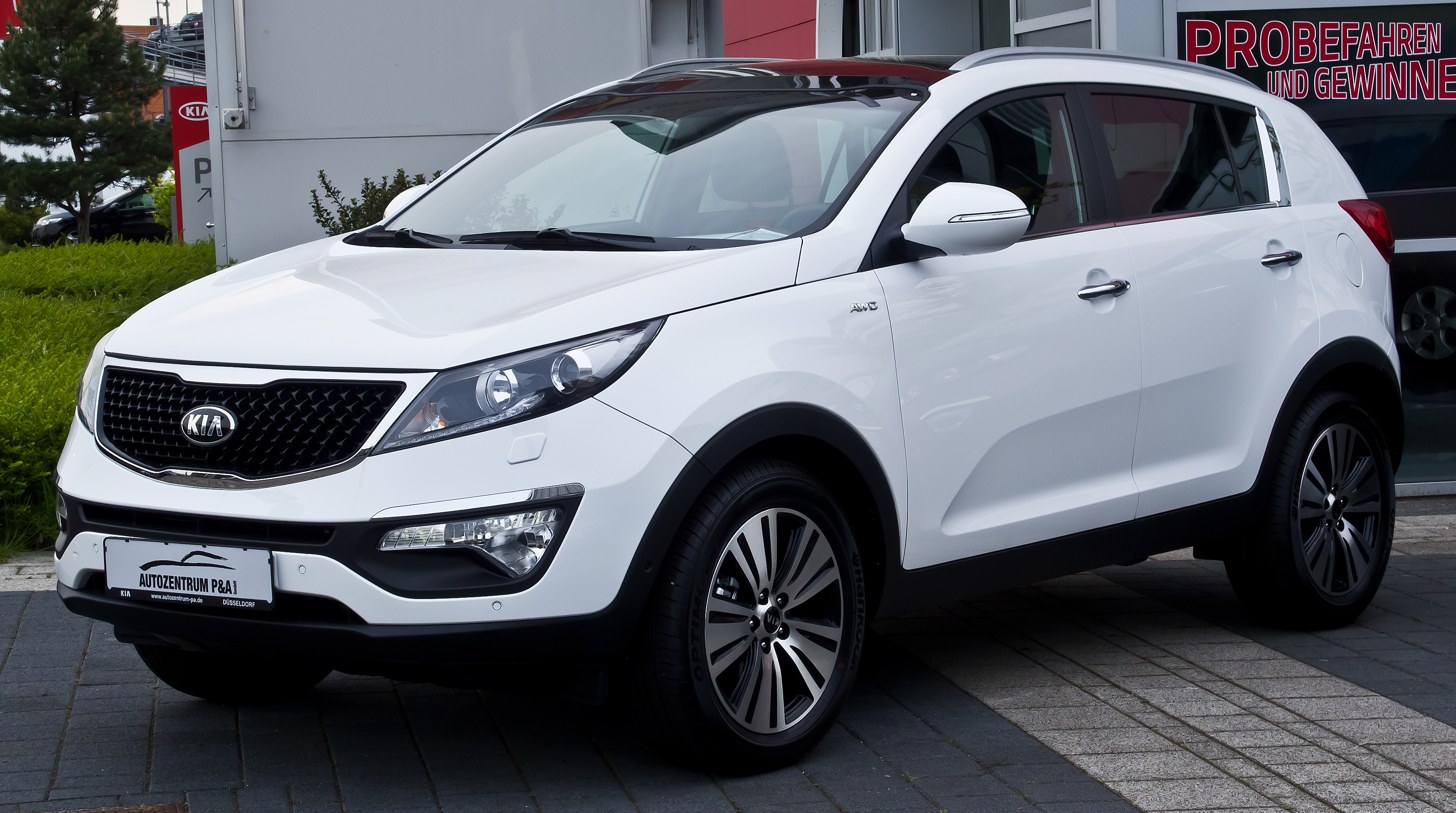
Kia Sportage (SL)

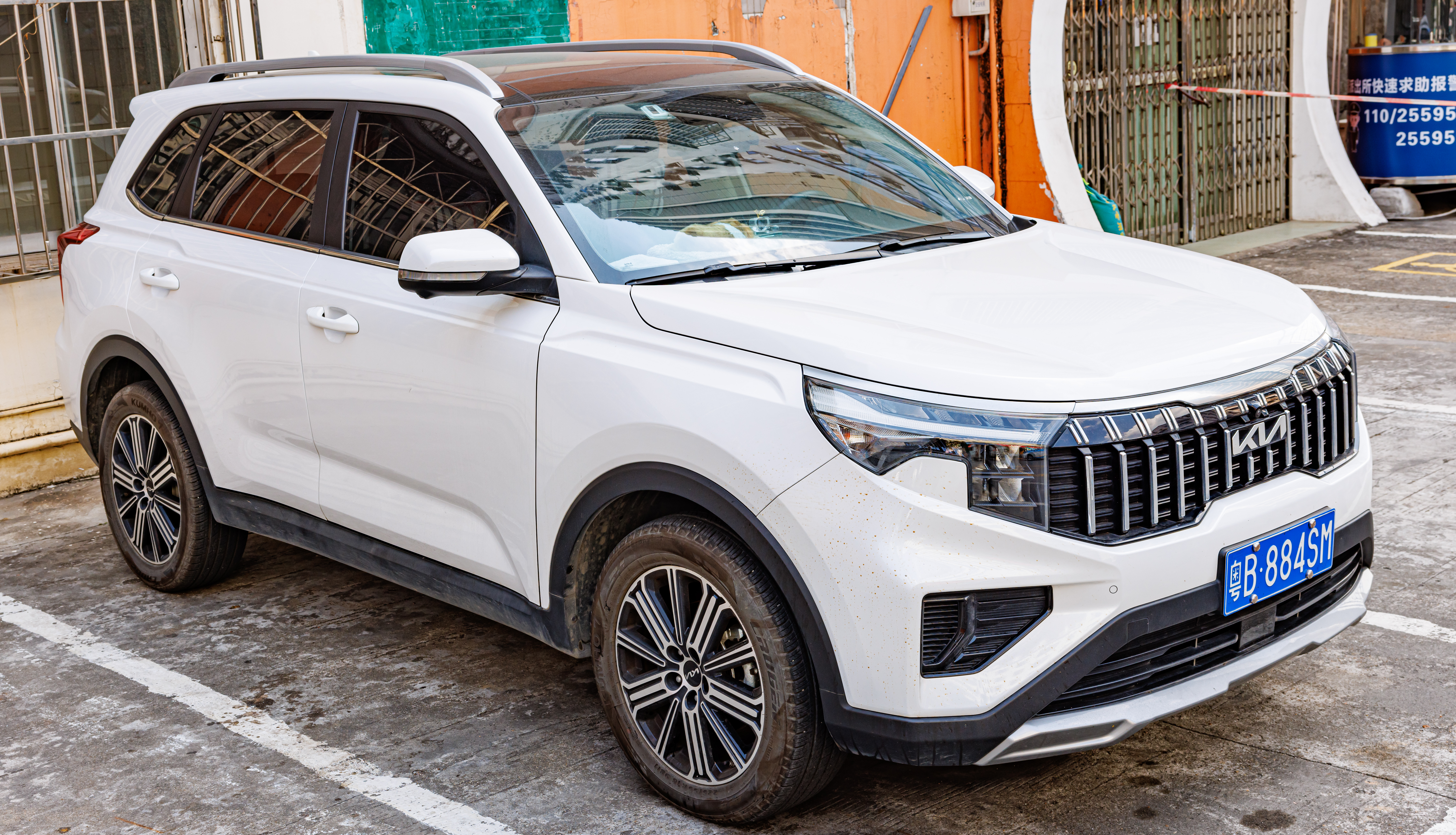
Kia Sportage (NP)

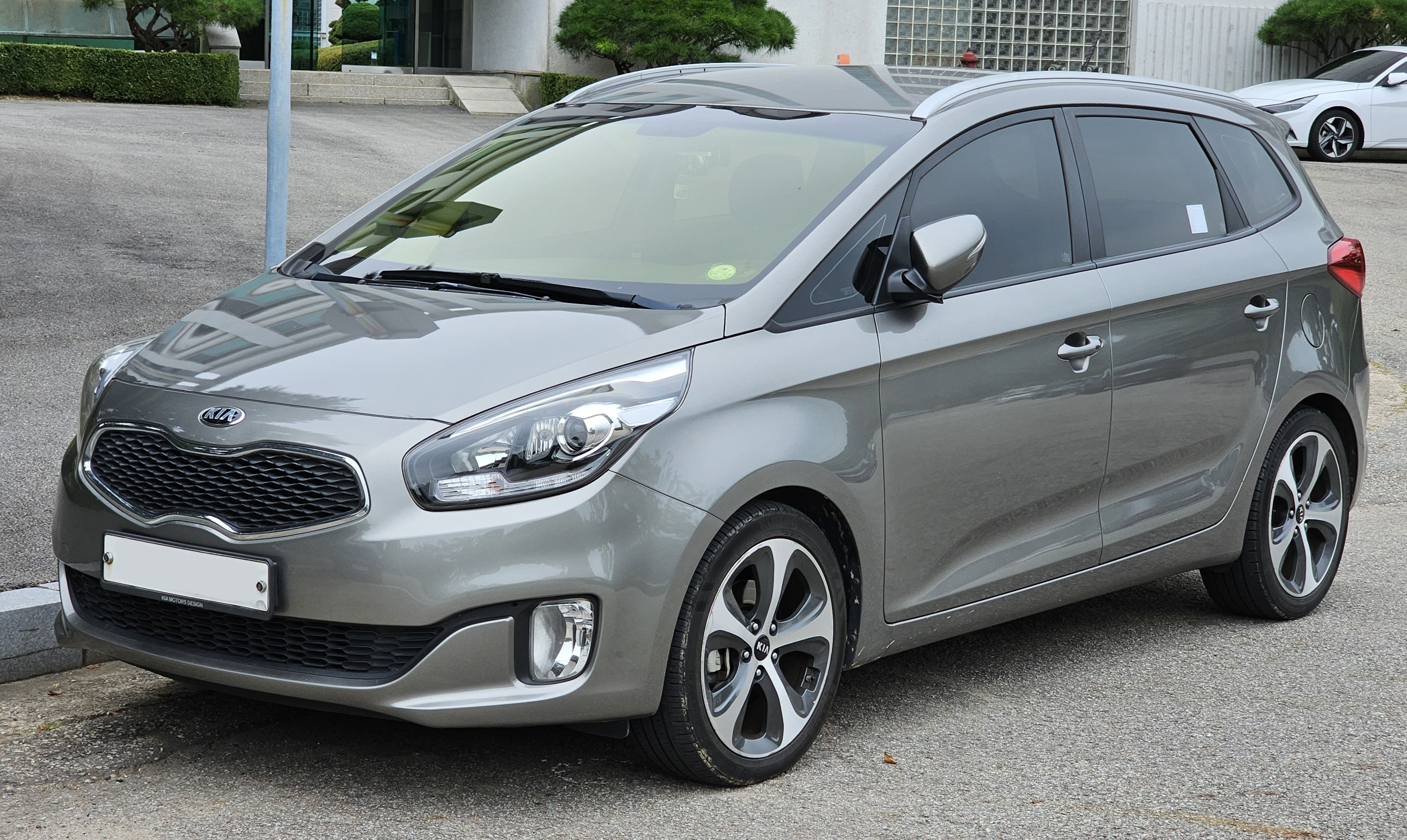
Kia Carens/Rondo (RP)

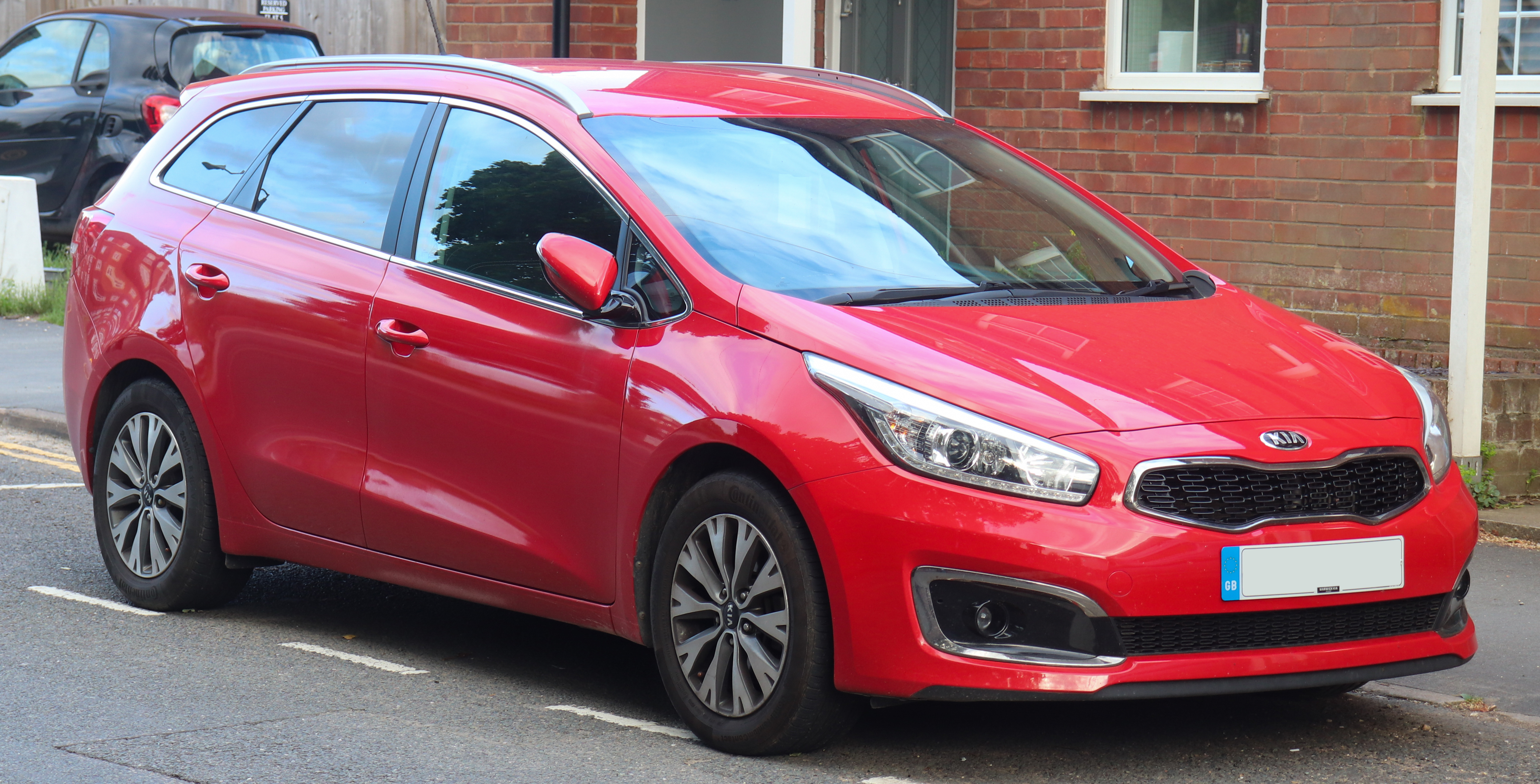
Kia Cee'd (JD)

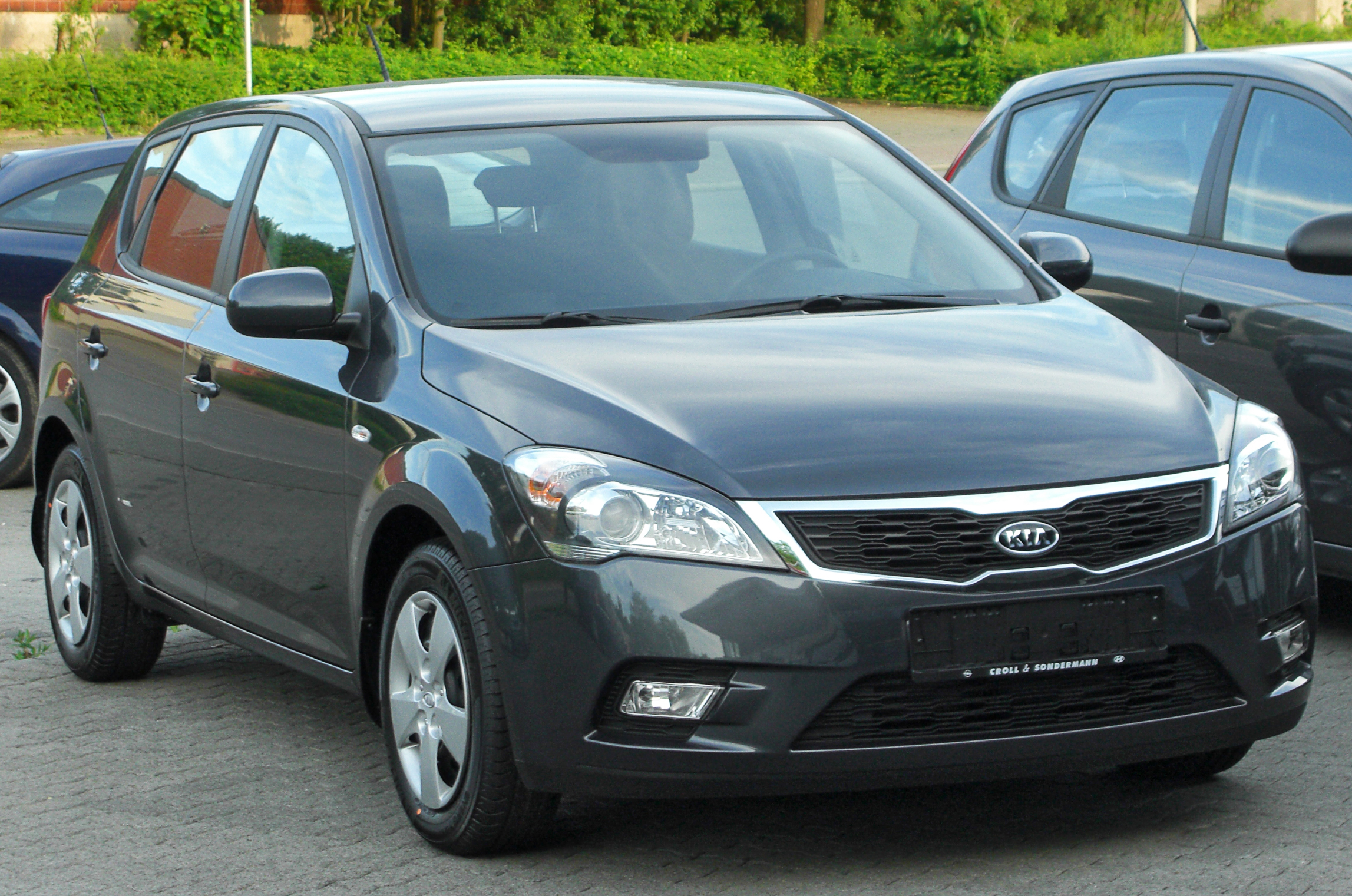
Kia Forte/Cerato (YD)

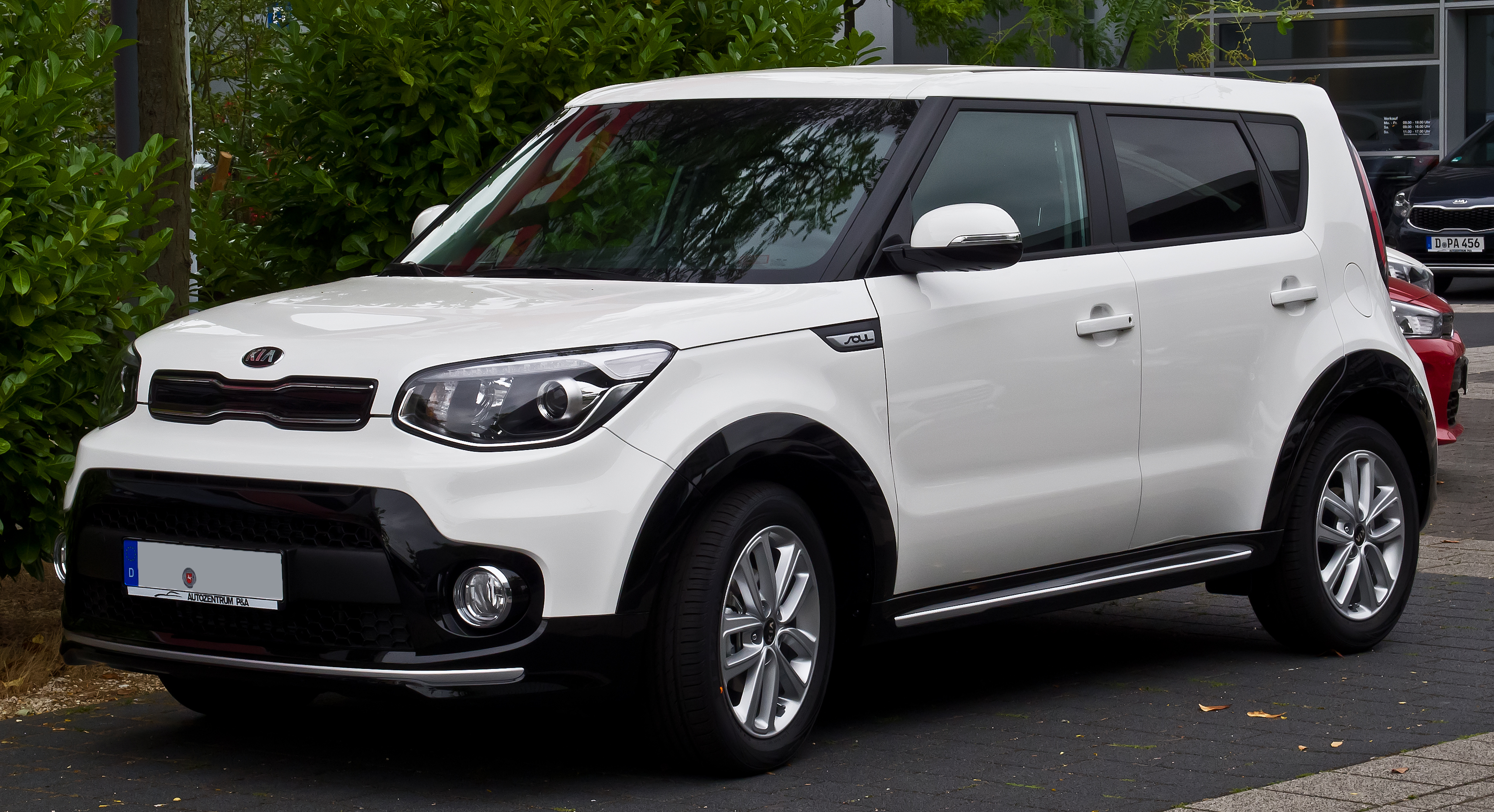
Kia Soul (PS)

== J6 platform ==
- Hyundai Elantra (AD) (2015–2020)
- Hyundai Veloster (JS) (2018–2022)
- Kia Forte/Cerato (BD) (2018–2024)
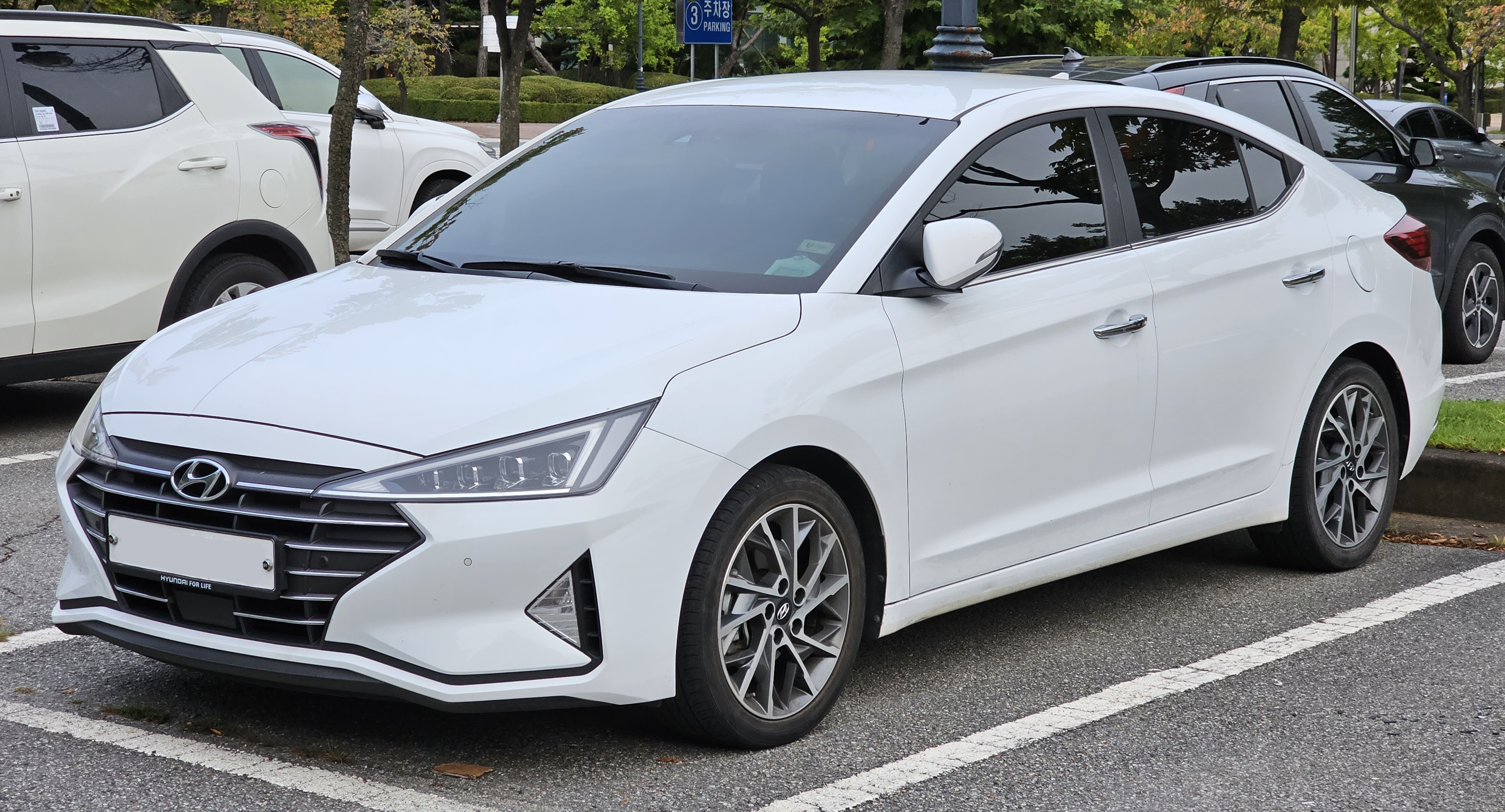
Hyundai Elantra (AD)

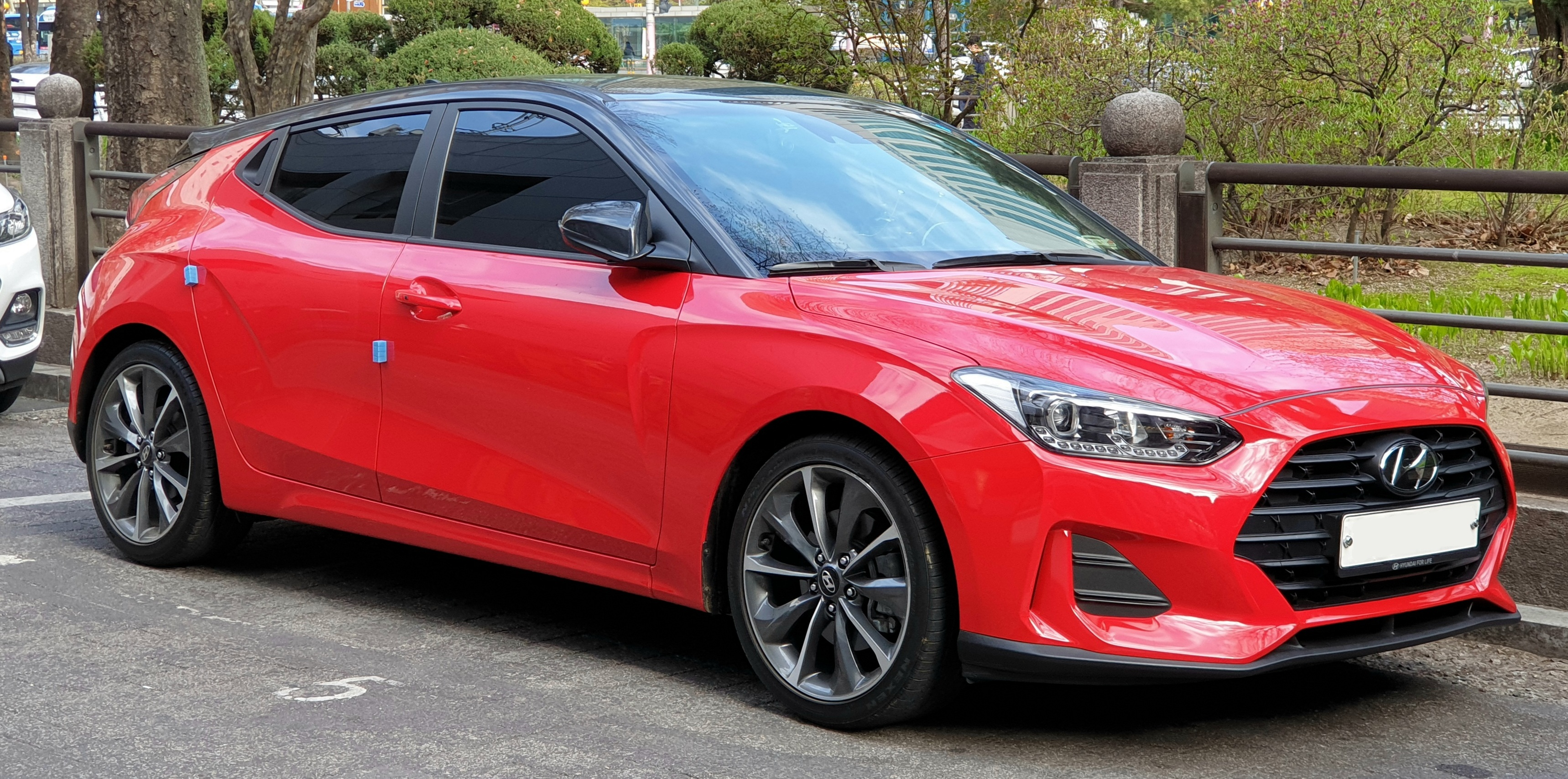
Hyundai Veloster (JS)

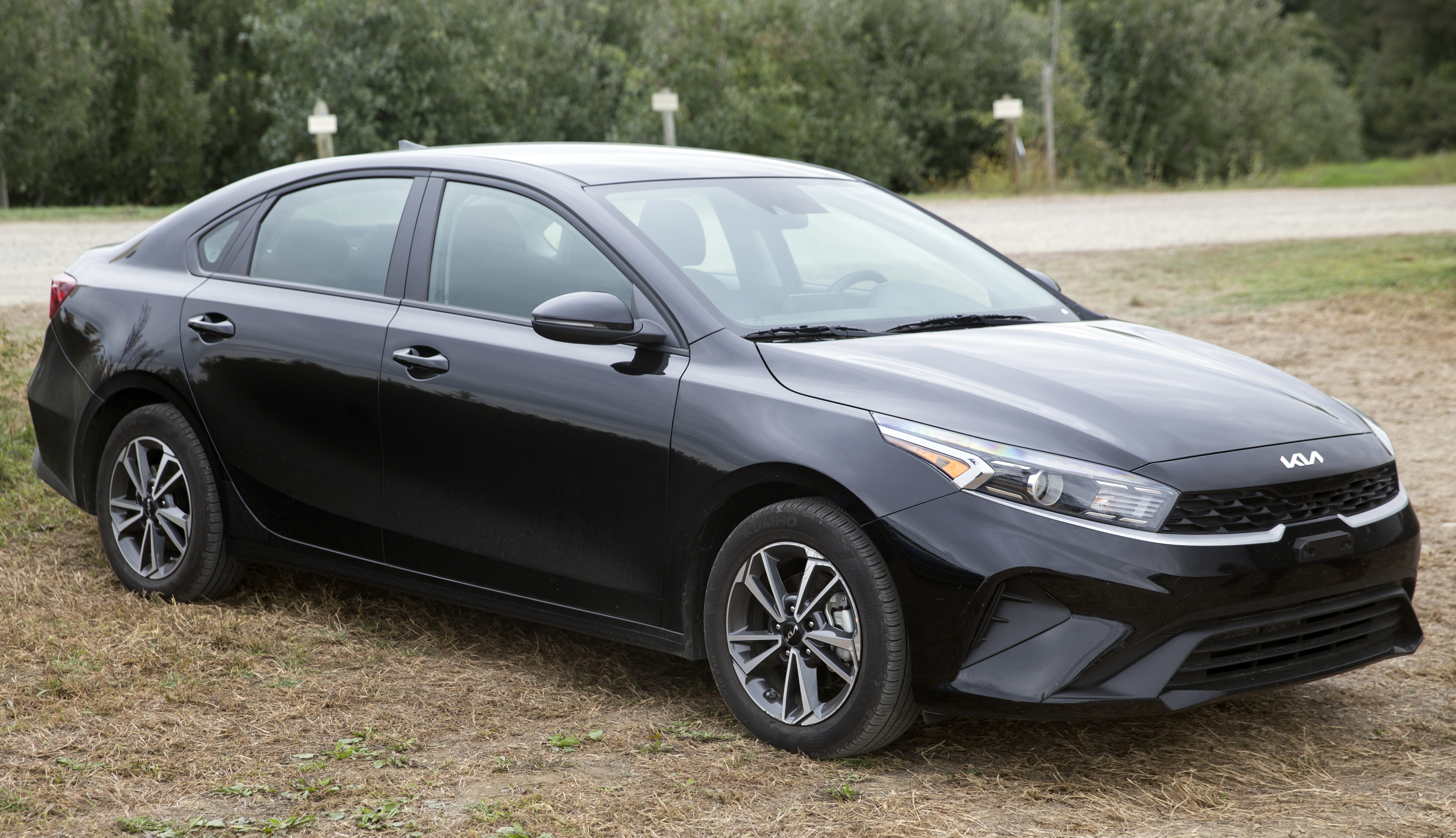
Kia Forte/Cerato (BD)

== Eco-Car platform ==
- Hyundai Ioniq (AE) (2016–2022)
- Hyundai Nexo (FE) (2018–2025)
- Kia Niro (DE) (2016–2022)
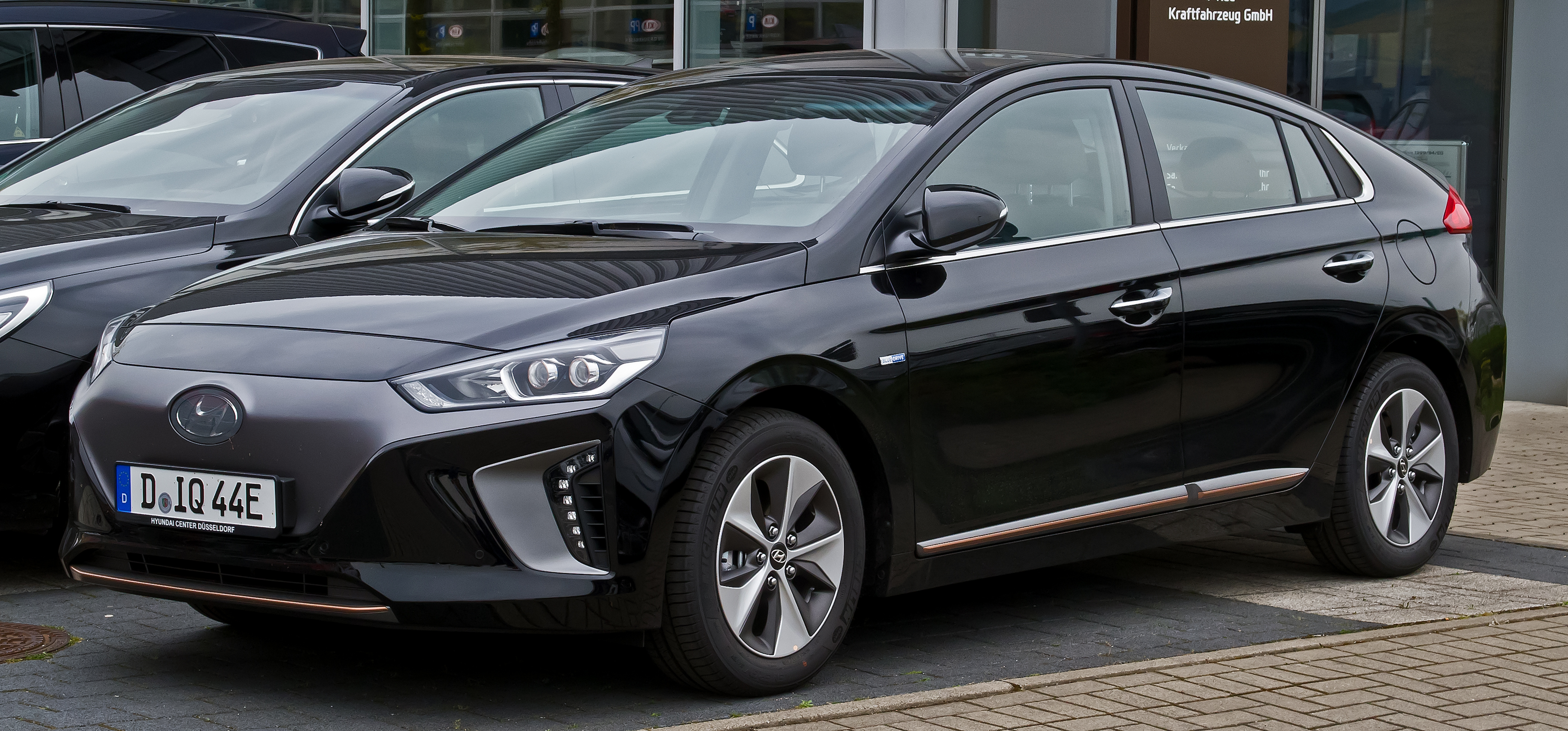
Hyundai Ioniq (AE)

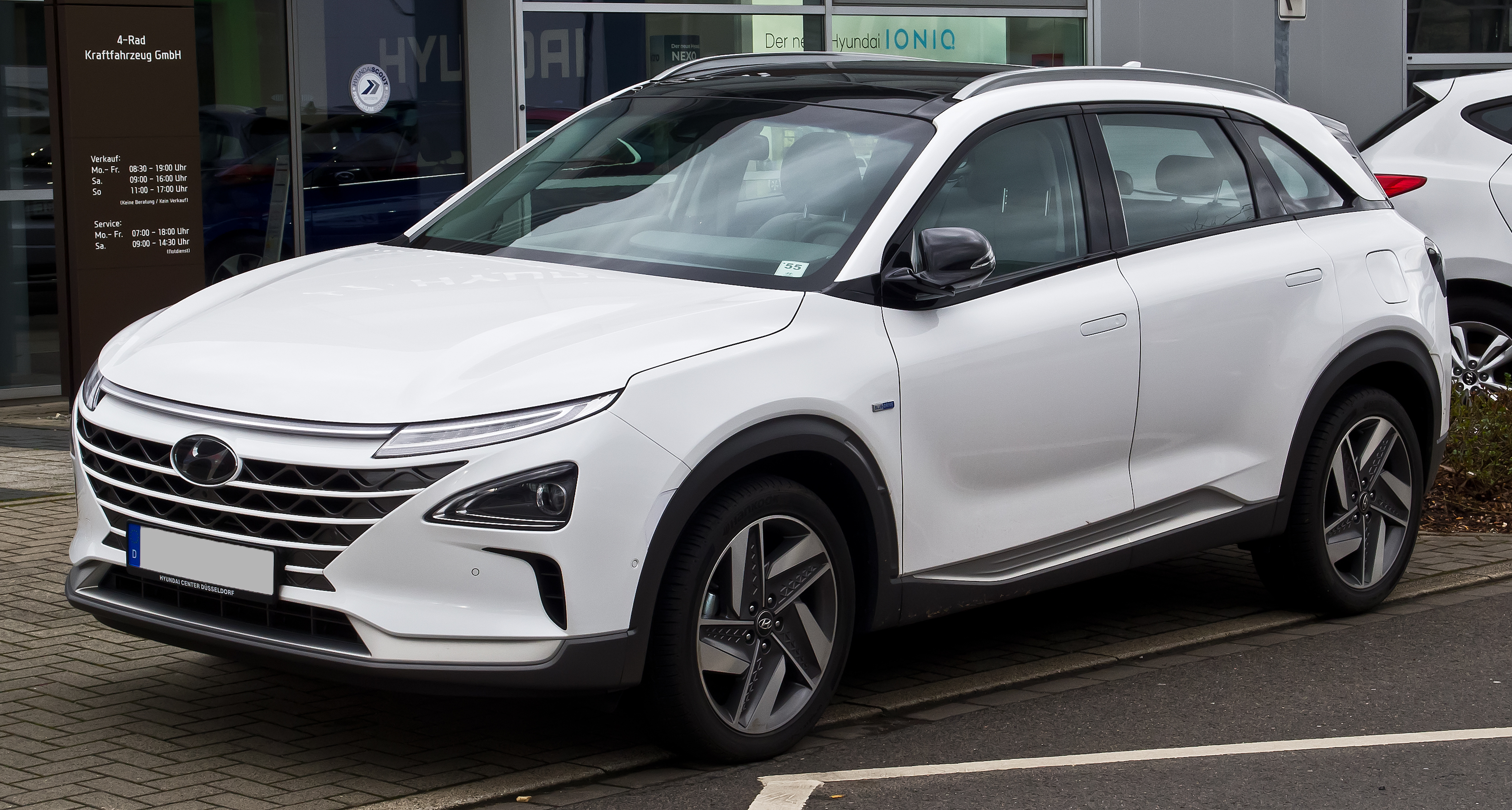
Hyundai Nexo (FE)

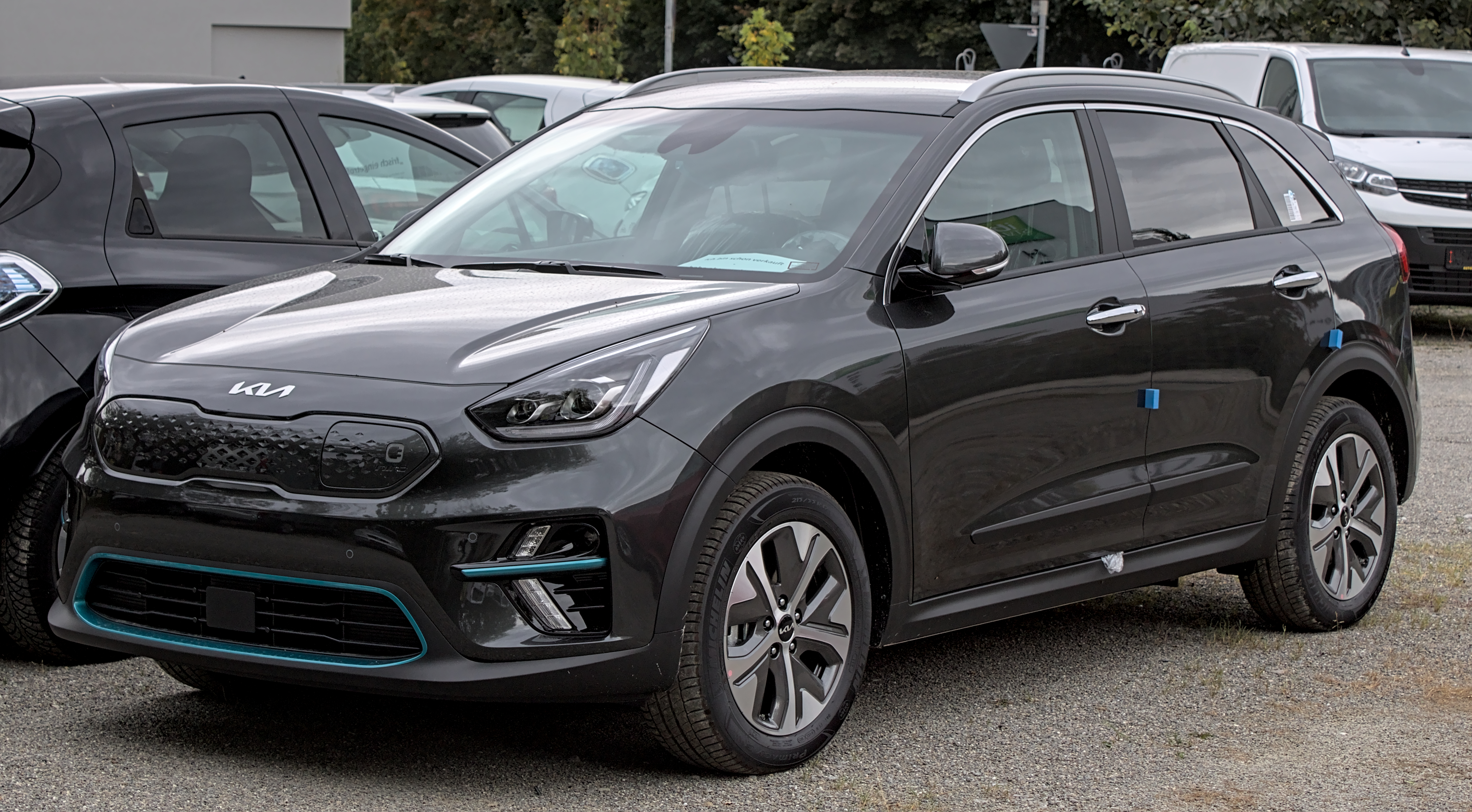
Kia Niro (DE)
