= Funakoshi Gichin Cup =

International Karate competition

Competition details
- Discipline: Shotokan Karate
- Type: Triennial
- Organiser: Japan Karate Association

History
- First edition: 1975
- Final edition: 2024

The Funakoshi Gichin Cup (also known as the Shoto Cup or the World Cup) is a major international karate tournament organized by the Japan Karate Association (JKA) roughly every three years. Formerly the Shoto World Cup, it is considered to be the successor of the IAKF World Championships, first held in 1975. The tournament is named after Gichin Funakoshi, the founder of Shotokan karate, and features karatekas from around the globe competing in kata (forms) and kumite (sparring).

== History ==
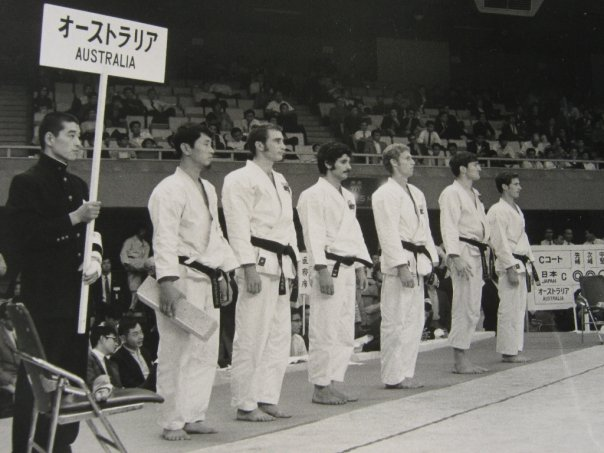
Australian athletes line up for the 1970 WUKO World Championships

=== WUKO and 1972 Controversy ===
In 1970, Ryoichi Sasakawa (at the time president of the Federation of All Japan Karatedo Organization) travelled to Paris to meet Jacques Delcourt, who formed the European Karate Union, in an effort to standardize and regulate international karate competition. The result was the creation of the World Union of Karate-do Organizations (WUKO), which would later become the World Karate Federation (WKF) in 1998. The first WUKO World Karate Championships was held later that year in Tokyo, Japan, with delegations from thirty-three nations.

The 1972 WUKO World Karate Championship held in Paris was riddled with controversy. Three countries withdrew in protest of apartheid, because South Africa was allowed to compete. In the middle of the tournament, the teams from the United States and Japan walked out due to complaints with officiating, and were later followed by five other teams. Masatoshi Nakayama, who was Chief Referee for the tournament, Hirokazu Kanazawa, Masahiko Tanaka, Takeshi Oishi, and other Japanese athletes and officials were banned from any future events hosted by WUKO, many of whom were members of the Japan Karate Association (JKA) at the time.

=== 1973 Commemoration Tournament ===
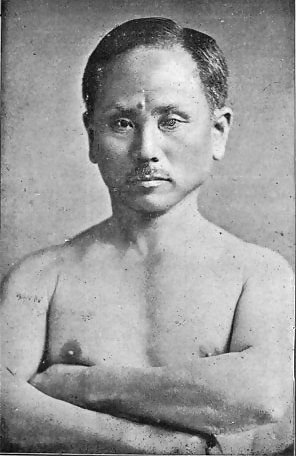
Gichin Funakoshi, after whom the World Cup named today

To celebrate the 50th anniversary of the popularization of karate by Gichin Funakoshi, the JKA hosted a commemorative world tournament. This is the first instance of the Funakoshi name used as a tournament title. Japan dominated the competition, defeating Italy in two finals to win both the kata and kumite titles. Current JKA Chief Instructor Takeshi Oishi won in individual kumite.

=== IAKF World Championships ===
The All American Karate Federation (AAKF), founded by Hidetaka Nishiyama in 1961 after arriving in the United States, had become one of the most influential karate organizations in the country after being called on by the Amateur Athletic Union (AAU) to select the American team for the 1972 WUKO World Karate Championships. However, fearing Nishiyama's rising influence and his goal of usurping the AAU's position as the American representative in WUKO, AAU president David Rivenes severed all ties to Nishiyama.

In response, Nishiyama formed the International Amateur Karate Federation (IAKF) in 1974 and was subsequently named executive director.

In the wake of Nakayama's expulsion from WUKO, the JKA aligned itself with the IAKF, with most of the national representatives made up of the JKA branches in the respective countries. With the support of the JKA, the 1975 IAKF World Karate Championship was held in Los Angeles, United States. Over three hundred officials and participants represented twenty-eight countries in front of a crowd of under 6500. Nakayama once again was Chief Judge. Masahiko Tanaka, who won the All Japan that year, took home the gold for men's kumite. Women were not allowed to compete at the first championships. A women's kata division was later created for the 1977 IAKF World Championships, but it was not until 1990 at the 3rd Shoto World Cup that women could finally compete in kumite.

The IAKF continued to hold more World Championships until its transition to the International Traditional Karate Federation (ITKF) in 1985.

=== Shoto World Cup ===
As the IAKF/ITKF diverged from the JKA to seek Olympic recognition, the JKA moved to continue the series of tournaments by sponsoring its own World Championships. Aptly named after Funakoshi's pen name, Shōtō (松涛), the Shoto World Cup surpassed the JKA's own All Japan Championships to become one of the largest karate tournaments in the world.

The 1st Shoto World Cup was subsequently held at the Nippon Budokan in Tokyo, Japan, in 1985. No longer were third place matches held. Instead, semifinalists were given joint bronze medals. During the Shoto Cup era, championships were held roughly every two years, up until the 9th Shoto World Cup in 2004. The longevity of this name is why the tournament is still often referred to as the Shoto Cup today.

==== 1990 Championships ====
The 3rd Shoto World Cup, held in Sunderland, England, allowed women to compete in kumite for the first time.

The team kumite final was fought between Japan and England. Since the walk out at the 1972 Championships, the Japanese national kumite team went undefeated at international tournaments. The lineup in 1990 included well-known karateka like Tomio Imamura and Masao Kagawa. However the English team was particularly strong that year as well, including Elwyn Hall and Frank Brennan. The match was close fought, but England ultimately won 3–2 to clinch the title, with victories from Hall, Brennan, and Dean Hodgkin. It was one of the few times Japan failed to win a team event at the Funakoshi Gichin Cup, and showed that the gap between Japan and the rest of the world was closing.

==== 1994 Championships ====
The 5th Shoto World Cup was held in the Philadelphia Civic Center, being first time the United States hosted the championships since the first IAKF tournament in 1975. Pavlo Protopapa of South Africa became the first non-Japanese to win a title at the championships. It was a particularly weak year for Japanese men's kumite, where Katsutoshi Shiina was the only member of the team to break into the top four. Japan placed third in team kumite, behind Sweden and Germany.

=== Funakoshi Gichin Cup ===
At the 2006 World Championships the tournament was renamed a final time. Officially now the Funakoshi Gichin Cup, the tournament maintains the name to this day.

Two Funakoshi Gichin Cups have been cancelled, once in 2009 and once again in 2020.

The 2024 championships saw a record 1800 athletes compete, and was the first time the tournament returned since 2017, before the COVID-19 pandemic.

== Competition ==
=== Participation ===
There is no limit to the number of countries able to participate. However, countries must be represented by a single team, hosted by an organization within the JKA World Federation (JKA-WF). National tryouts are conducted by these representative organizations, where athletes typically have to hold recognized ranking from the JKA. Currently, the JKA-WF is affiliated with over 130 countries around the world. The tournament includes two disciplines, kata (forms) and kumite (sparring), further divided into individual and team events. Divisions are separated by age and gender, including junior (ages 9 to 18) all the way to veteran (70+) categories. Each country can only send four athletes for each division. The tournament is conducted under the JKA Rules and Regulations.

=== Kumite ===
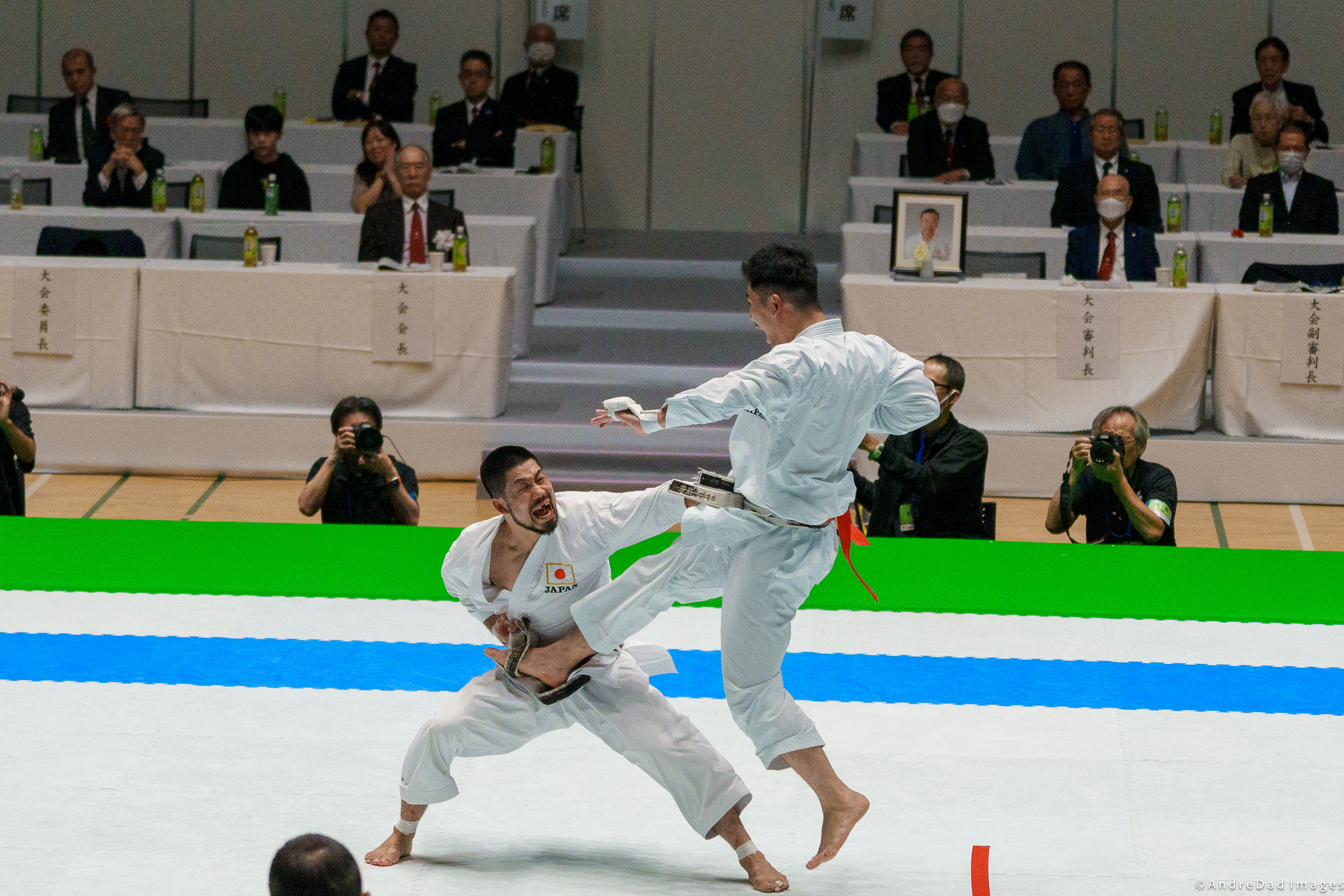
Tatsuro Igarashi (left) faces off against Hikaru Hirose (right) in the 2024 kumite finals

The style of kumite practiced is known as shobu ippon kumite. Techniques are scored based on decisiveness and effectiveness, including various punches (tsuki), kicks (keri), and strikes (uchi). The first person to score Ippon or one full point is declared the winner.

The men's individual final match is sanbon shobu style, where a winner must score two ippon to win.

The Funakoshi Gichin Cup is a single-elimination tournament, meaning competitors who win matches continue onto the next round, until only one winner remains.

==== Scoring ====
Techniques may be executed to the head (jodan) or abdomen (chudan). To successfully score a point, techniques must be done with proper power, timing, distance, posture, target, control, and spirit. Ippon scores typically consist of kicks to the head or takedowns followed by strikes on the ground.

Techniques that are effective but do not meet all the criteria of ippon are scored as a half-point or waza-ari.

==== Team Kumite ====
Teams are made up of five athletes in the men's division and three in the women's. Each athlete competes once, and the team to win a majority of the matches wins the round.

=== Kata ===
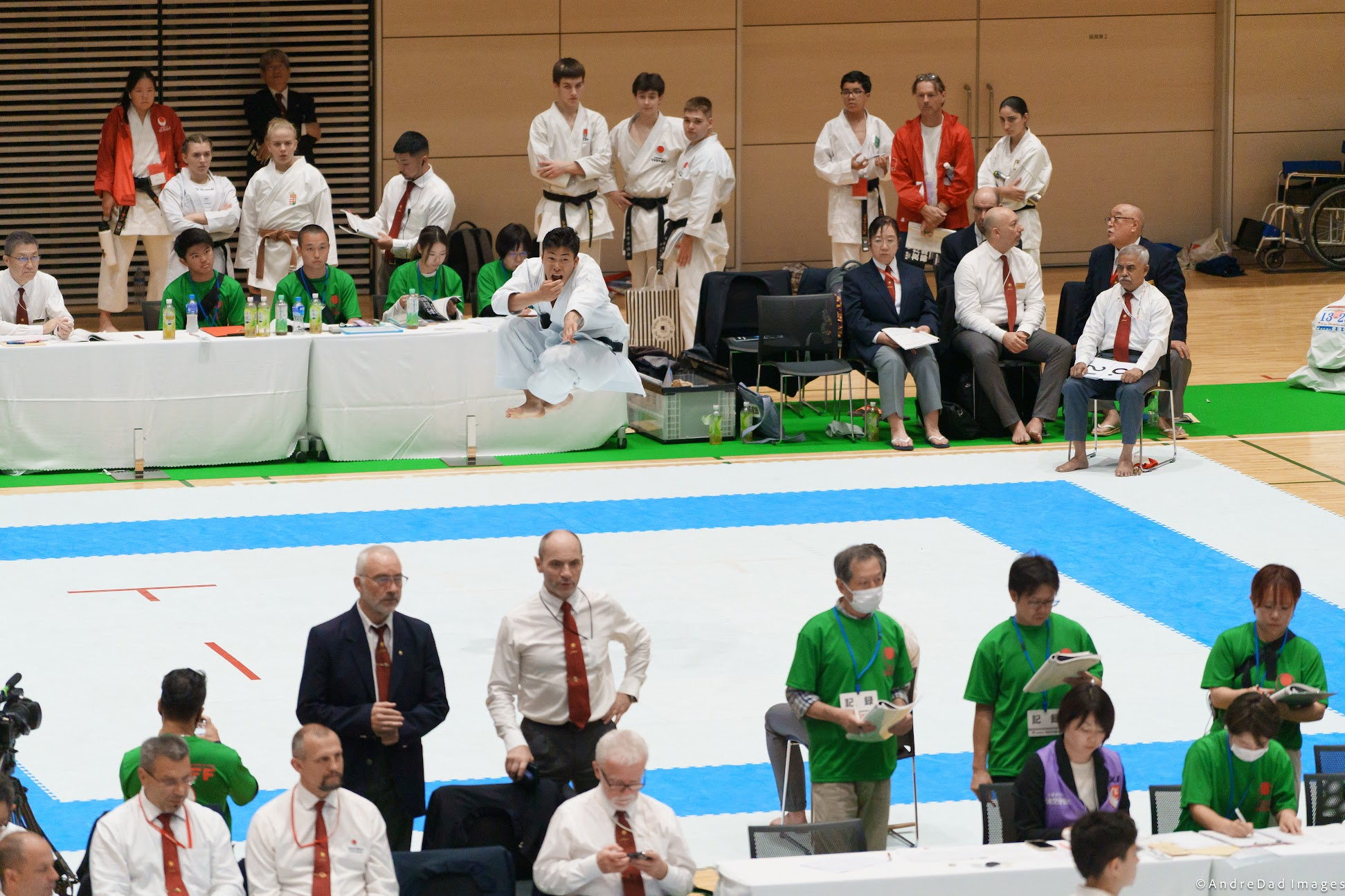
Japanese athlete Ukyo Tatsumi performs the jump in the kata Enpi at the 16th Championships

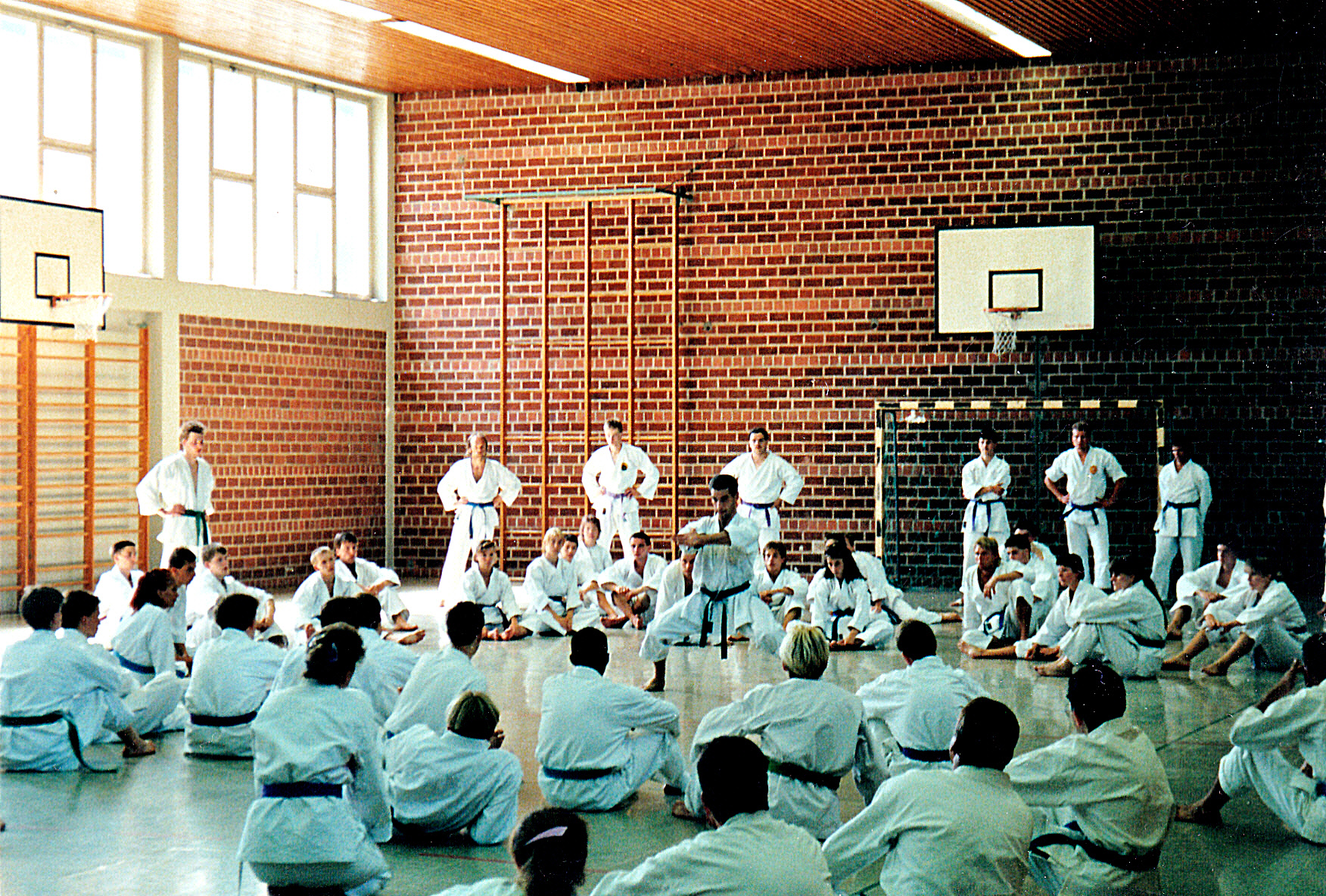
1975 silver medalist Carlo Fugazza demonstrates kata at a seminar

Kata competition consists of multiple rounds. The first group of rounds is judged under the flag system, single-elimination style. Two athletes perform the same kata simultaneously, and a winner of chosen to progress to the next round. A kata is randomly selected for each match, starting with the beginner or shitei kata pool, then transitioning to the intermediate or sentei kata pool later on.

Upon reaching the semifinals (top 16), judging changes to the points system. Athletes in the semifinal round perform a kata individually, picking one of the four sentei katas to perform. In two pools of eight athletes, the highest scoring four from each pool continue to the final round (top eight). In the final round athletes perform a tokui or favorite kata, which is self chosen. The highest scoring athlete in the final round wins the championship. All katas performed must be one of the 25 approved by the JKA.

Kata List
Shitei	Sentei	Tokui		
Heian Shodan*	Bassai Dai	Jitte	Unsu	Gojushiho Dai
Heian Nidan	Kanku Dai	Hangetsu	Meikyo	Tekki Nidan
Heian Sandan	Jion	Gankaku	Wankan	Tekki Sandan
Heian Yondan	Enpi	Bassai Sho	Sochin	
Heian Godan		Kanku Sho	Nijushiho	
Tekki Shodan		Chinte	Gojushiho Sho	

- Oftentimes, the first kata (heian shodan) is not drawn for competitions.

==== Scoring ====
Athletes are judged on correct stance, posture, timing, spirit, and knowledgeable execution of the kata. In competition, all kata must end at the same point at where it starts (embusen), so correct stance length is critical.

Under the flag system, judges watch two performances simultaneously and designate one of the two athletes as the winner. A draw can also be called, in which the athletes compete again, this time drawing a different kata.

Under the points system, a "median score" is chosen by the Chief Judge, and deductions or additions to the median score are made based on the performance of the kata. The highest and lowest scores are removed, and the remaining scores are added to result in the total score for the performance.

==== Team Kata ====
Team kata is performed by teams of three for both women's and men's divisions. A team is judged not just on performance of the kata, but synchronization between team members as well. Team kata is only judged under the points system, where teams elect a sentei kata until the final round (top eight), where a tokui kata is chosen.

== List of World Championships ==
Year	Tournament name	Location
1975	1st IAKF World Championships	(United States) Los Angeles, USA
1977	2nd IAKF World Championships	Tokyo, Japan
1980	3rd IAKF World Championships	Bremen, West Germany
1983	4th IAKF World Championships	Cairo, Egypt
1985	1st Shoto World Cup	Tokyo, Japan
1987	2nd Shoto World Cup	Brisbane, Australia
1990	3rd Shoto World Cup	Sunderland, England
1992	4th Shoto World Cup	Tokyo, Japan
1994	5th Shoto World Cup	(United States) Philadelphia, USA
1996	6th Shoto World Cup	Osaka, Japan
1998	7th Shoto World Cup	Paris, France
2000	8th Shoto World Cup	Tokyo, Japan
2004	9th Shoto World Cup	Tokyo, Japan
2006	10th Funakoshi Gichin Cup World Karate-do Championships	Sydney, Australia
2009	11th Funakoshi Gichin Cup World Karate-do Championships†	Tokyo, Japan
2011	12th Funakoshi Gichin Cup World Karate-do Championships	Pattaya, Thailand
2014	13th Funakoshi Gichin Cup World Karate-do Championships	Tokyo, Japan
2017	14th Funakoshi Gichin Cup Karate World Championship	(Republic of Ireland) Limerick, Ireland
2020	15th Funakoshi Gichin Cup Karate World Championship‡	Takasaki, Japan
2024	16th Funakoshi Gichin Cup Karate World Championship	Takasaki, Japan

†Cancelled due to the 2008 financial crisis.

‡Cancelled due to the COVID-19 pandemic.

=== Past Results ===
==== Male Kumite ====
Year	Champion	Runner-up	3rd Place	
1975	(Japan) Masahiko Tanaka	(Japan) Takeshi Oishi	(United Kingdom) Billy Higgins	
1977	(Japan) Masahiko Tanaka	(Italy) Bruno De Michelis	(Germany) Jürgen Willrodt	
1980	(Japan) Toshihiro Mori	(Socialist Federal Republic of Yugoslavia) Dusan Dacic	(Germany) Jürgen Hoffmann	
1983	(Japan) Hideo Yamamoto	(Italy) Claudio Guazzaroni	(Egypt) Hosny Gabr	
1985	(Japan) Minoru Kawawada	(Japan) Masaaki Yokomichi	(Japan) Takayuki Tsuchii	(Japan) Masao Kagawa
1987	(Japan) Tomio Imamura	(United Kingdom) Frank Brennan	(United Kingdom) George Best	(Belgium) Marco Barone
1990	(Japan) Masao Kagawa	(United Kingdom) Ronnie Christopher	(Belgium) Fillipo Allata	(Sweden) Leslie Jensen
1992	(Japan) Tomio Imamura	(United Kingdom) Frank Brennan	(Japan) Kunio Kobayashi	(Japan) Tatsuya Naka
1994	(South Africa) Pavlo Protopapa	(Belgium) Jeannot Mulolo	(South Africa) Colin Smith	(Japan) Katsutoshi Shiina
1996	(Canada) Don Sharp	(Japan) Toshihito Kokubun	(Japan) Kunio Kobayashi	(Japan) Takuya Taniyama
1998	(Japan) Toshihito Kokubun	(Japan) Koji Ogata	(Switzerland) Pierre Toudjip	(Belgium) Jeannot Mulolo
2000	(Japan) Toshihito Kokubun	(South Africa) Johan LaGrange	(Japan) Takuya Taniyama	(Japan) Koji Ogata
2004	(Japan) Koji Ogata	(Sweden) Miroslav Femic	(Japan) Koichiro Okuma	(South Africa) Johan LaGrange
2006	(Japan) Koji Ogata	(Brazil) Chinzo Machida	(Japan) Keisuke Nemoto	(Japan) Koichiro Okuma
2011	(Japan) Rikiya Iimura	(Japan) Koji Chubachi	(Japan) Keisuke Nemoto	(Russia) Andrey Mazurov
2014	(Japan) Koji Chubachi	(Japan) Rikiya Iimura	(Japan) Keisuke Nemoto	(Thailand) Supa Ngamphuengphit
2017	(Chile) Rodrigo Rojas	(Japan) Okada Yasunori	(Japan) Daisuke Ueda	(Japan) Yusuke Haga
2024	(Japan) Hikaru Hirose	(Japan) Tatsuro Igarashi	(Japan) Yuya Oosawa	(Japan) Yusuke Haga

==== Male Kata ====
Year	Champion	Runner-up	3rd place
1975	(Japan) Yoshiharu Osaka	(Italy) Carlo Fugazza	(Germany) Michael Strauch
1977	(Japan) Yoshiharu Osaka	(Japan) Mikio Yahara	(Italy) Carlo Fugazza
1980	(Japan) Yoshiharu Osaka	(Japan) Mikio Yahara	(Greece) Efthimios Karamitsos
1983	(Japan) Yoshiharu Osaka	(Japan) Mikio Yahara	(Egypt) Saedd El Herem
1985	(Japan) Minoru Kawawada	(Japan) Masao Kagawa	(Japan) Akira Fukami
1987	(Japan) Takenori Imura	(Japan) Masao Kagawa	(Japan) Okazaki Hiroyoshi
1990	(Japan) Tomoyuki Aihara	(United Kingdom) Frank Brennan	(Japan) Masao Kagawa
1992	(Japan) Tomoyuki Aihara	(Japan) Imura Takenori	(Japan) Yuji Hashiguchi
1994	(Japan) Takenori Imura	(Japan) Okazaki Hiroyoshi	(Japan) Tomoyuki Aihara
1996	(Japan) Takenori Imura	(Japan) Yuji Hashiguchi	(Japan) Tomoyuki Aihara
1998	(Japan) Yuji Hashiguchi	(Japan) Seizo Izumiya	(Japan) Takuya Taniyama
2000	(Japan) Takuya Taniyama	(Japan) Seizo Izumiya	(Japan) Katsutoshi Shiina
2004	(Japan) Katsutoshi Shiina	(Japan) Takuya Taniyama	(Japan) Kobayashi Kunio
2006	(Japan) Kurihara Kazuaki	(Japan) Kobayashi Kunio	(Japan) Saitoh Yuki
2011	(Japan) Kurihara Kazuaki	(Japan) Naoto Maruoka	(Japan) Hideki Hukuhara
2014	(Japan) Hidemoto Kurihara	(Japan) Daisuke Ueda	(Japan) Kurihara Kazuaki
2017	(Japan) Kurihara Kazuaki	(Japan) Hidemoto Kurihara	(Japan) Yushi Hakizume
2024	(Japan) Kaishi Hakizume	(Japan) Hidemoto Kurihara	(Japan) Yushi Hakizume

==== Female Kumite ====
Year	Champion	Runner-up	3rd Place	
1990	(Japan) Yuko Hasama	(Netherlands) Lisette Zelissen	(United Kingdom) Karen Findley	(Japan) Keiko Kawano
1992	(Japan) Yukiko Yoneda	(Japan) Yoshimi Naoko	(Japan) Sakurako Sasaki	(Japan) Keiko Kawano
1994	(Japan) Hiromi Hasama	(Japan) Mayumi Baba	(Japan) Kimiyo Nakamura	(Indonesia) Daud Nilawati
1996	(Japan) Hiromi Hasama	(Japan) Mayumi Baba	(Japan) Shoko Sakuragi	(Japan) Yuko Okuda
1998	(Japan) Mayumi Baba	(United Kingdom) Caroline Quansum	(United Kingdom) Colette Glynn	(Japan) Hiromi Hasama
2000	(Japan) Hiromi Hasama	(Japan) Okuda Yuko	(South Africa) Christy Cauvin	(Japan) Mayumi Baba
2004	(Japan) Okuie Satomi	(Japan) Takahashi Yuko	(Socialist Federal Republic of Yugoslavia) Tatjana Nikolic	(Hungary) Krisztina Zsigmond
2006	(Japan) Yuko Takahashi	(Japan) Okuda Yuko	(Australia) Tracy Pearce	(Australia) Storm Wheatley
2011	(Japan) Asumi Isiduka	(Sweden) Glusa Akdag	(Russia) Alla Sergeeva	(Venezuela) Josmaira Quiroz
2014	(Japan) Taguchi Satoshitama	(Japan) Mai Shiina	(Japan) Yuki Ito	(Czech Republic) Petra Cifkova
2017	(Japan) Mai Shiina	(Japan) Amano Minori	(Argentina) Jeanette Castaneda	(Japan) Kyoko Akiyama
2024	(Japan) Hinako Kitagawa	(Japan) Moe Yoshida	(Japan) Kyoko Akiyama	(Canada) Alessandra Longo

==== Female Kata ====
Year	Champion	Runner-up	3rd place
1977	(Japan) Hiromi Kawashima	(Japan) Keiki Hayakawa	(United States) R. Senior
1980	(Japan) Hiromi Kawashima	(Japan) Hiroko Moriya	(Germany) Schweiber
1983	(Japan) Hiroko Moriya	(Japan) Yuko Sakada	(Japan) Yoko Nakamura
1985	(Japan) Yoko Nakamura	(Japan) Kikue Yamamoto	(Japan) Yurika Yoshida
1987	(Japan) Yuki Mimura	(Japan) Yoko Nakamura	(Japan) Hiroe Sekimori
1990	(Japan) Yuki Mimura	(Sweden) Lena Svensson-Pyrée	(Japan) Maiko Asano
1992	(Japan) Yoko Nakamura	(Japan) Miyo Gunji	(Japan) Miwa Akiyama
1994	(Japan) Yoko Nakamura	(Indonesia) Ompi Omita	(Japan) Haruna Ikutake
1996	(Japan) Yoko Nakamura	(Japan) Miyo Gunji	(Japan) Nakata Terumi
1998	(Japan) Miyoko Fujiwara	(Japan) Miyo Gunji	(South Africa) Karin Prinsloo
2000	(Japan) Nakata Terumi	(Japan) Miyo Gunji	(Japan) Chiharu Azuma
2004	(Japan) Nakata Terumi	(Japan) Misako Aragaki	(Japan) Oshima Nozomi
2006	(Japan) Misako Aragaki	(Japan) Nozomi Oshima	(Japan) Shirota Takaki
2011	(Japan) Nozomi Oshima	(Japan) Miki Nakamachi	(Japan) Serino Fukasaku
2014	(Japan) Miki Nakamachi	(Japan) Ayano Nakamura	(Japan) Hikawa Nao
2017	(Japan) Ayano Nakamura	(Japan) Yuna Sato	(Japan) Rio Hayakawa
2024	(Japan) Saori Ishibashi	(Japan) Tamaki Shimura	(Japan) Airi Sekizawa
