= Jack Green (karateka) =

British martial artist

- Born: Blackpool
- Nationality: British
- Style: Shotokan Karate
- Trainer: Keinosuke Enoeda, Hirokazu Kanazawa
- Rank: 2nd Dan

Other information
- Notable club: Liverpool Red Triangle

Jack Green was one of the first three men in the UK to be graded to black belt in Shotokan karate, an original member of the KUGB, and their first national kumite champion.

== Biography ==
Jack Green trained at the Red Triangle karate club in Liverpool, and studied under Hirokazu Kanazawa and Keinosuke Enoeda. In 1966, Green became the third person to pass a grading in the UK for a black belt in Shotokan karate, following Red Triangle clubmates Andy Sherry and Joseph Chialton. Green, alongside Sherry and Eddie Whitcher, was also one of the first to be graded to 2nd Dan in the UK, attaining the rank in 1967 at Crystal Palace.

In 1967, Green won the inaugural KUGB kumite championships.

In 1969, he founded the Blackpool School of Karate affiliated to the British Karate Federation. After Green left the club, Ian Smith took over at Revoe Gymnasium. The club then joined Shotokan Karate International under Asano Shiro, and later Kanazawa's 'Kodokai' under Kato Sadashige. Kato later affiliated with the International Japan Karate Association, under Tetsuhiko Asai.

== See also ==
- Shotokan
- Karate Union of Great Britain
