= Terry O'Neill (martial artist) =

English martial artist

- Born: 27 February 1948 (age 78); Liverpool
- Nationality: British
- Style: Shotokan karate

Other information
- Notable relatives: Tyler O'Neill, professional baseball player

Terry O'Neill (born 27 February 1948) is an English actor and martial artist.

== Early life ==
O'Neill was born in Liverpool, England, the son of a police officer and became interested in martial arts from an early age.

He first started to train at Judo, but later applied to join the Liverpool Karate Club, lying about his age to gain admission.

His first teacher was Andy Sherry, with occasional visits by Murakami Sensei, Veron Bell, Terry Wingrove and later, Kanazawa Sensei.

== Competitive martial arts career ==
His introduction to Kumite was in the 1967 KUGB National Championships. O'Neill later won the KUGB National Championships Individual Kumite Kata title in 1972—1975, 1977, and 1978. He was three times the KUGB Grand Champion, and from 1967 to 1981 was a member of the Red Triangle Team who were KUGB National Team Champions on 13 occasions.

A member of the KUGB International Squad from 1968 till 1982, he was also Captain of the British All-Styles Squad who defeated Japan to win the 1975 World Championships in Los Angeles, USA.

O'Neill's competitive fighting career came to an end in 1982, when he seriously damaged the ligaments of his knee in an International match against Italy.

In 1972, he founded the UK Martial Arts magazine Fighting Arts International, which he ran until 1997.

A senior member of the KUGB, he is also an International Referee and a KUGB Grading Examiner. He has been a member of the KUGB since its establishment.

In 2006 the premier US martial arts magazine Black Belt published an unordered list of the "deadliest fighters on the planet", excluding deceased fighters and mixed-martial artists, an attempt to subjectively rate the men according to how skilled they were in their prime, with O'Neill ranked No.1 .

== Acting career ==
O'Neill has also worked as an actor, appearing with Arnold Schwarzenegger, Michael Caine and Sean Connery. He has also appeared on British television in Civvies (1992), Comics (1993), The Governor (1995), The Commander: Windows of the Soul (2007), Giri (2008) and Above Suspicion (2009). He has also acted as a martial arts consultant on several films.

=== Filmography ===
- Conan the Destroyer (1984)
- In the Name of the Father (1993)
- Dragonheart (1996)
- The Man Who Knew Too Little (1997)
- Kull the Conqueror (1997)
- Liverpool 1 (UK TV Series) Series 1, Episode-4, "Paper Trail" (28 September 1998)
- Entrapment (1999)
- Quills (2000)
- Formula 51 (2001)
- Gangs of New York (2002)
- The League of Extraordinary Gentlemen (2003)

== See also ==
- Shotokan
- KUGB
- Andy Sherry
- Dave Hazard
- Frank Brennan
