= Satoshi Takahashi =

Japanese karateka

- Born: 9 February 1968 (age 57); Osaka Prefecture, Japan
- Style: Shotokan Karate
- Teacher(s): Masatoshi Nakayama
- Rank: 6th Dan karate (JKA)

Satoshi Takahashi (Takahashi Satoshi, born 9 February 1968) is a Japanese instructor of Shotokan karate.

He is currently an instructor of the Japan Karate Association.

== Biography ==
Satoshi Takahashi was born in Osaka, Japan on 9 February 1968. He studied at Takushoku University. His karate training began during his 5th year of elementary school.

== Competition ==
Satoshi Takahashi has had considerable success in karate competition.

=== Major Tournament Success ===
- 50th JKA All Japan Karate Championship (2007) - 3rd Place Kata
- 44th JKA All Japan Karate Championship (2001) - 3rd Place Kumite; 3rd Place Kata
- 42nd JKA All Japan Karate Championship (1999) - 3rd Place Kata
- 38th JKA All Japan Karate Championship (1995) - 3rd Place Kumite
