= Yasuo Hanzaki =

Japanese karateka

- Born: 12 December 1962; Aomori Prefecture, Japan
- Style: Shotokan Karate
- Teacher(s): Masatoshi Nakayama
- Rank: 7th Dan karate (JKA)

Yasuo Hanzaki (Hanzaki Yasuo, 12 December 1962) is a Japanese instructor of Shotokan karate.

He is currently an instructor of the Japan Karate Association.

== Biography ==
Yasuo Hanzaki was born in Aomori Prefecture, Japan on 12 December 1962. He studied at Taisho University. His karate training began during his 1st year of high school.

== Competition ==
Yasuo Hanzaki has had considerable success in karate competition.

=== Major Tournament Success ===
- 42nd JKA All Japan Karate Championship (1999) - 3rd Place Kumite
- 35th JKA All Japan Karate Championship (1992) - 3rd Place Kumite
- 34th JKA All Japan Karate Championship (1991) - 2nd Place Kumite
- 33rd JKA All Japan Karate Championship (1990) - 3rd Place Kumite
