= Yasunori Ogura =

Japanese karateka (born 1958)

- Born: 21 January 1958; Hokkaido, Japan
- Style: Shotokan Karate
- Teacher(s): Masatoshi Nakayama
- Rank: 8th Dan karate (JKA)

Yasunori Ogura (Ogura Yasunori, 21 January 1958) is a Japanese master of Shotokan karate. He has won the JKA All-Japan championships for kumite. He is currently the Acting Executive Director of the Japan Karate Association.

== Biography ==
Yasunori Ogura was born in Hokkaido, Japan on 21 January 1958. He studied at Taisho University. His karate training began during his 1st year of high school.

== Competition ==
Yasunori Ogura has had considerable success in karate competition.

=== Major Tournament Success ===
- 3rd Shoto World Cup Karate Championship Tournament - 1st Place Group Kata
- 29th JKA All Japan Karate Championship (1986) - 1st Place Kumite
- 28th JKA All Japan Karate Championship (1985) - 2nd Place Kumite
- 27th JKA All Japan Karate Championship (1984) - 3rd Place Kumite
