= Mai Miyashita =

Japanese karateka

- Born: Mai Shiina (椎名舞); February 23, 1988 (age 38); Tokyo Prefecture, Japan
- Native name: 宮下舞
- Style: Shotokan karate
- Teacher: Masaaki Ueki
- Rank: 5th dan (JKA)

Other information
- University: Takushoku University

Mai Miyashita (宮下 舞, Miyashita Mai; née Shiina, 椎名 舞, Shiina Mai; born February 23, 1988) is a Japanese karateka of the Shotokan style.

In 2017, she won the Funakoshi Gichin Cup for kumite. She has reached the 5th dan in the Japan Karate Association (JKA) system.

She is currently an instructor with the JKA.

== Biography ==
Mai Shiina was born in Tokyo Prefecture, Japan on February 23, 1988. She began practicing karate at the age of four, and later attended Takushoku University. In 2025, she changed her surname to Miyashita. Her motto is "see perfection of character".

== Competition ==
Mai Miyashita has had considerable success in karate competition.

- Funakoshi Gichin Cup
  - Kumite
    - Winner (1): 2017 (Ireland)
    - Runner-up (1): 2014 (Japan)
- JKA All Japan Karate Championship
  - Kata
    - Third place (1): 2021
  - Kumite
    - Winner (4): 2011, 2015, 2016, 2021
    - Runner-up (3): 2013, 2014, 2018
