= Keinosuke Enoeda =

Japanese karateka

- Historical photo of Keinosuke Enoeda
- Born: 4 July 1935; Japan
- Died: 29 March 2003 (aged 67); Tokyo
- Other names: Tora (Tiger)
- Style: Shotokan karate
- Teachers: Gichin Funakoshi, Masatoshi Nakayama, Taiji Kase
- Rank: 9th dan karate (JKA)

Other information
- Notable students: Frank Brennan, Dave Hazard, Andy Sherry, Norman Robinson
- Website: KUGB Profile - Sensei Keinosuke Enoeda

Keinosuke Enoeda (榎枝 慶之輔, Enoeda Keinosuke; 4 July 1935 – 29 March 2003) was a Japanese master of Shotokan karate. He was a former Chief Instructor of the Karate Union of Great Britain. Enoeda was ranked 8th dan in Shotokan karate, and was widely renowned as a formidable karateka (practitioner of karate). Following his death, Enoeda was posthumously awarded the rank of 9th dan.

== Early life ==
Enoeda was born on 4 July 1935 on the island of Kyushu, Japan. As a youth, he trained in kendo and judo, and played baseball. By the age of 16, Enoeda had reached the rank of 2nd dan in judo. He entered Takushoku University and, being impressed by a karate demonstration there, began studying that martial art.

After he graduated from Takushoku, Enoeda studied at the Japan Karate Association (JKA) honbu dojo (headquarters training hall) in Tokyo under Gichin Funakoshi Founder of Shotokan Karate and Masatoshi Nakayama, then the JKA's Chief Instructor. He also trained in kumite under the direction of Taiji Kase. In 1961, he fought a notable tournament match against Keigo Abe, winning by decision after six extensions. He won the JKA All Japan Championship in 1963 against another well-known karateka, Hiroshi Shirai. During this period, Enoeda acquired the nickname Tora ("Tiger" in Japanese), after Nakayama had described his fighting.

== United Kingdom ==
On 20 April 1965, following the JKA's policy of sending instructors abroad to introduce karate to the rest of the world, Enoeda travelled to England with JKA instructors Shirai, Kanazawa, and Kase. He began teaching in Liverpool. One of Enoeda's British students in the late 1960s was karate scholar Harry Cook.

Enoeda and his wife, Reiko (married in 1969), settled in Kingston, Surrey. In 1971, Enoeda had a minor uncredited role as one of Ernst Stavro Blofeld's henchman in the James Bond film Diamonds are Forever. In 1973, Enoeda led a demonstration of karate on live television for the BBC. Part of the Open Door series it was the first British TV programme entirely about karate. The demonstration included kihon (basic techniques), kata (patterns), Enoeda sparring multiple opponents, Enoeda against Tomita with a large blade, and Dave Hazard breaking a piece of Japanese hardwood.

While Chief Instructor of the KUGB, Enoeda was assisted by: Sadashige Kato (from c. 1966–1973), Shiro Asano (from 1968 to 1974), Hideo Tomita (from 1973 to 1978), Masao Kawasoe (from 1974 to 1982), and Yoshinobu Ohta (from 1982 to 2003). In 1985, Enoeda was ranked 8th dan.

== Later life ==
Enoeda wrote several books on karate, including: Shotokan: Advanced kata (1983, in three volumes), Shotokan Karate (1996), Shotokan Karate: 10th Kyu to 6th Kyu (1996), Shotokan Karate: 5th Kyu to Black Belt (1996), Karate: Defence & attack (1996, co-authored), and Shotokan Karate: Free Fighting Techniques (1999, co-authored).

Enoeda used to promote his dojo with "Dynamic Karate" posters on the London Underground. He continued teaching karate, at the Marshall Street Baths near Carnaby Street in London, until his death on 29 March 2003. Shortly after his death, the JKA awarded him the rank of 9th dan. Enoeda left behind his wife, Reiko, and children Daisuke and Maya.
