= Takushoku University =

Private university in Tokyo, Japan

Coordinates: 35.715374°N 139.736239°E

- 拓殖 大学
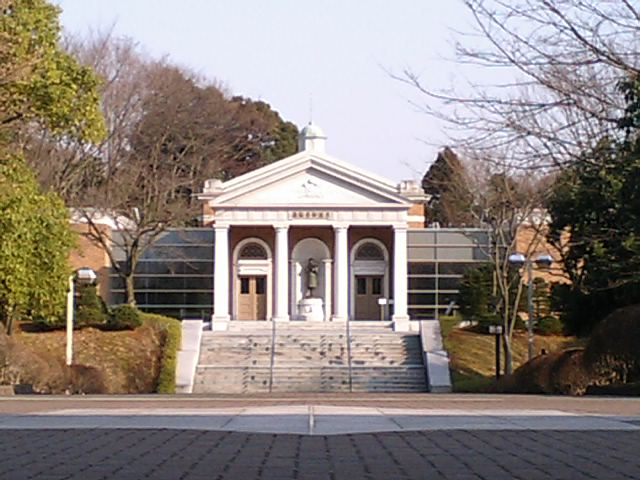
- Onshi Memorial Hall, Takushoku University
- Former names: Taiwan Association School, Oriental Association Vocation School, Kōryō University
- Type: Private
- Established: 1900; 126 years ago
- Location: Tokyo, Japan
- Campus: Bunkyō, Hachiōji
- Website: www.takushoku-u.ac.jp (in Japanese) lang.takushoku-u.ac.jp/en/ (in English)

Takushoku University (拓殖大学, Takushoku Daigaku), abbreviated as 拓大 (Takudai) is a private university in Tokyo, Japan. It was founded in 1900 by Prince (title for a Duke at that time) Taro Katsura (1848–1913). It has two campuses: the main campus in the Bunkyō Ward and a satellite campus in Hachiōji. Takushoku University has five faculties: Commerce, Political Science and Economics, Foreign Languages, International Studies, and Engineering.

Takushoku University is a university of security studies in Japan. A previous university chancellor, Satoshi Morimoto, was Japan's former Minister of Defense. Some past chancellors such as Taro Katsura and Yasuhiro Nakasone were previously Japanese prime ministers.

== History ==
Originally, Takushoku University was named the Taiwan Association School, and was founded to produce graduates to contribute to the development of Taiwan. In 1907, it was renamed the Oriental Association Vocational School. In 1918, it adopted its present name of Takushoku University. Literally, "Takushoku" means "development and industrialization" as well as "colonization", because Japan had overseas colonies like Taiwan, South Sakhalin, and Korea and was entrusted with South Pacific Islands to industrialize at that time.

Takushoku University as a unique colonial institute made itself one of the best private universities in Japan after Imperial Universities such as Tokyo University till the end of World War II. It supported a pacifist position by appointing General Kazushige Ugaki as its Chancellor, who opposed the military expansionist Imperial Way Faction, and then Hiroshi Shimomura, who was the president of Cabinet Intelligence Bureau leading the Hirohito surrender broadcast. An affiliated judo master Tatsukuma Ushijima and his disciple Masahiko Kimura of the university even planned to assassinate the prime and military minister Hideki Tojo in 1941.

After the war, Japan gave up its colonies, and the university changed its name to Kōryō University (紅陵大学, Kōryō Daigaku). It was led by Torajiro Takagaki, the president of Japan association of monetary economics. In 1952, it reverted to its traditional name. Many graduates went to Brazil as well as Indonesia and other South Asian countries in the 1960s and 70s.

In the 1970s and 80s it expanded its campus into Hachioji and established two more faculties. In 2001, it celebrated its 100-year anniversary in presence of Emperor Akihito. It opened another faculty for world development and international security in Hachioji. Realizing SDGs (sustainable development goals) is its mission in the 21st century.

Takushoku University is a leading university in the study of national security in Japan. Takushoku University is also one of the few universities in Japan with an institute for studying geopolitics for international relations and security.

Margaret Thatcher received her honorary doctorate degree at this university.

The Faculty of Political Science and Economics is the third oldest in the country after Waseda and Meiji universities.

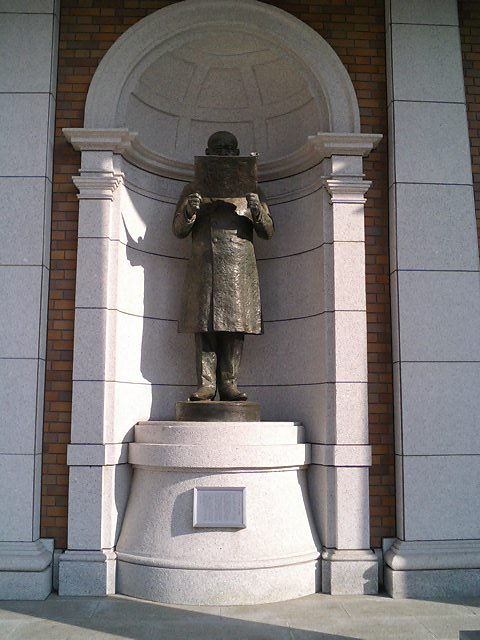
Statue of Taro Katsura, founder of Takushoku University, at Onshi Memorial Hall

== Organization ==
=== Faculties ===
- Commerce
- Political Science and Economics
- Foreign Languages
- International Studies
- Engineering

=== Graduate schools ===
- Economics
- Commerce
- Engineering
- Language Education
- International Cooperation Studies
- Local Government

== Sports ==
Takushoku University was responsible for training many of Japanese local and colonial administrators as well as overseas merchants. Several of these people who were karateka (practitioners of karate) took up administrative positions in the Japan Karate Association when it was founded in 1949. The university's karate club was founded around 1924 and has produced many prominent karate instructors and competitors. The university also has a judo program, which produced a second-place result in a 1967 Japanese collegiate competition. The athletics club was founded in 1921. It has participated in the Hakone Ekiden 42 times as of 2021.

== Alumni ==
- Takahashi, Katsutaro (1941-1991), Shotokan karate master
- Asai, Tetsuhiko (1935–2006), Shotokan karate master
- Ayukawa, Tetsuya (1919-2002), critic and novelist
- Enoeda, Keinosuke (1935–2003), Shotokan karate master
- Eto, Batara (1979–), software engineer
- Asano, Shiro (1939–), Shotokan karate master
- Fujino, Maiko (1983–), swimmer
- Fujiwara, Arata (1981–), marathon runner
- Funago, Yasuhiko (1957–), politician
- Higaonna, Morio (1938–), Goju-ryu karate master
- Honaga, Norio (1955–), wrestler
- Inoue, Naoya (1993–), professional boxer
- Inoue, Nissho (1887–1967), radical Buddhist preacher and terrorist
- Imamura, Tomio (1958–), master of Shotokan karate
- Iwaki, Nobuko (1946–), politician
- Kanazawa, Hirokazu (1931–2019), Shotokan karate master
- Kawase, Kota (1992–), football player
- Kawasoe, Masao (1945–), Shotokan karate master
- Kawasoe, Norio (1951–2013), Shotokan karate master
- Kawawada, Minoru (1952–), Shotokan karate master
- Kimura, Masahiko (1917–1993), judo master
- Kobayashi, Fumikazu (1978–), athlete
- Kobayashi, Yu (1987–), football player
- Kuramoto, Koji (1951–), judo master
- Kurumizawa, Koshi (1925–1994), writer
- Maeda, Shinzo (1922–1998), landscape photographer
- Masudayama Yasuhito (1951–), sumo wrestler
- Mori, Masataka (1932–2018), Shotokan karate master
- Mori, Mucha (1988–), basketball player
- Moriyama, Mirai (1984–), film and television actor
- Munakata, Koju (1967–), basketball coach
- Murakami, Kazunari (1973–), mixed martial artist
- Nagai, Akio (1942–), Shotokan karate master
- Nagano, Ai (1974–), voice actress
- Nagano, Mamoru (1960–), manga artist
- Naka, Tatsuya (1964–), Japan Karate Association manager
- Nakamori, Daisuke (1987–), football player
- Nakamoto, Kentaro (1982–), long-distance runner
- Nakayama, Masatoshi (1913–1987), Shotokan karate master
- Nishiyama, Hidetaka (1928–2008), Shotokan karate master
- Ochi, Hideo (1940–), Shotokan karate master
- Okazaki, Teruyuki (1931–2020), Shotokan karate master
- Okuyama, Takemasa (1944–), Shotokan karate master
- Onoda, Kazuo (1900-1983), freestyle swimmer
- Onoda, Kimi (1982-), politician
- Onodera, Tatsuya (1987–), football player
- Osaka, Yoshiharu (1947–), instructor of Shotokan karate
- Oyama, Masutatsu (1923–1994), Kyokushin karate master
- Rogers, Doug (1941–2020), Olympic judo competitor from Canada
- Royal Kobayashi (1949–), junior featherweight boxer
- Ryūkō Gō (1971–), sumo wrestler
- Uriu, Sadamu (1929–2020), Shotokan karate master
- Saito, Takako (1983–), female wrestler
- Saruta, Hironori (1982–), football player
- Shioda, Gozo (1915–1994), aikido master
- Shiina, Katsutoshi (1961–), master of Shotokan karate
- Sione Vatuvei (1983–), footballer
- Sudo, Genki (1978–), mixed martial arts competitor and politician
- Sugimoto, Makoto (1987–), football player
- Suzuki, Muneo (1948–), politician
- Suzuki, Yasuhiro (1984–), boxer
- Takahashi, Ken (1969–), baseball player
- Takahashi, Mai (1984–), actress and model
- Takahashi, Satoshi (1968–), instructor of Shotokan karate
- Takatani, Sohsuke (1989–), wrestler
- Taniyama, Takuya (1965–), instructor of Shotokan karate
- Tokoro, George (1955–), comedian, TV personality, singer-songwriter
- Tokuhisa, Takashi (1947–), Shotokan karate master
- Terada Kiyoyuki (1922–2009), aikido master
- Tochinonada, Taiichi (1974–), sumo wrestler
- Tsukii, Junna (1991-), Filipino-Japanese karateka
- Uchiyama, Takashi (1979–), super featherweight boxer
- Watanabe, Hideo (1934–), politician
- Watanabe, Hiroyuki (1955–2022), television actor
- Yaegashi, Akira (1983–), minimumweight boxer
- Yonemitsu, Tatsuhiro (1986–), wrestler
- Yumoto, Shinichi (1984–), wrestler
- Kawase, Kota (1992-), footballer

== See also ==
- Shotokan
- Nitobe Inazō, the second dean
- Gotō Shinpei, the third principal
- Kazushige Ugaki, the fifth principal
- Yasuhiro Nakasone, the twelfth principal
- Satoshi Morimoto, professor
- Shūmei Ōkawa (1886-1957), professor
- Masahiro Yasuoka (安岡正篤, Yasuoka Masahiro; (1898 – 1983)), professor
- Higashionna Kanjun, professor
- Kō Bun'yū (黄文雄; 1938–2024), Taiwanese author on staff
