= JKA England =

Karate association

- Abbreviation: JKAE
- Type: Sports federation
- Headquarters: London, SW7
- Members: Japan Karate Association
- Chief Instructor: Yoshinobu Ohta
- Website: www.jka-england.org

JKA England (JKAE) is the official Japan Karate Association (JKA) organisation for Shotokan karate in England and Wales.
