= Keisuke Nemoto =

Japanese karateka

- Born: 31 May 1979; Chiba Prefecture, Japan
- Style: Shotokan Karate
- Teacher: Masaaki Ueki
- Rank: 5th Dan karate (JKA)

Keisuke Nemoto (born 31 May 1979) is a Japanese instructor of Shotokan karate. He has won the JKA All-Japan championships for kumite. He is currently an instructor of the Japan Karate Association.

== Biography ==
Keisuke Nemoto was born in Chiba Prefecture, Japan on 31 May 1979. He studied at Chiba Industrial University. His karate training began at age 5.

== Competition ==
Keisuke Nemoto has won the JKA All Japan Karate Championship multiple times and reached 3rd place at the Funakoshi Gichin Cup World Karate-do Championship Tournament twice.

=== Major tournaments ===
- 12th Funakoshi Gichin Cup World Karate-do Championship Tournament (Pattaya, 2011) – 3rd Place Kumite
- 10th Funakoshi Gichin Cup World Karate-do Championship Tournament (Sydney, 2006) – 3rd Place Kumite
- 53rd JKA All Japan Karate Championship (2010) – 1st Place Kumite
- 55th JKA All Japan Karate Championship (2012) – 1st Place Kumite
- 56th JKA All Japan Karate Championship (2013) – 1st Place Kumite
