= Makoto Sugimoto =

Japanese footballer

Personal information
- Full name: Makoto Sugimoto
- Date of birth: October 27, 1987 (age 39)
- Place of birth: Nagano, Japan
- Height: 1.64 m (5 ft 4 1/2 in)
- Position: Midfielder

Team information
- Current team: Vonds Ichihara

Youth career
- 2006–2009: Takushoku University

Senior career*
Years	Team	Apps	(Gls)
2010–2018	Tochigi SC	155	(23)
2019–	Vonds Ichihara	?	(?)
- * Club domestic league appearances and goals as of 2 January 2019

Makoto Sugimoto (杉本 真, Sugimoto Makoto; born October 27, 1987 in Nagano) is a Japanese football player who currently plays for Vonds Ichihara.

== Career ==
On 11 January 2019, Sugimoto joined Vonds Ichihara.

== Career statistics ==
Updated to 23 February 2017.

Club performance			League		Cup		League Cup		Total	
Season	Club	League	Apps	Goals	Apps	Goals	Apps	Goals	Apps	Goals
Japan			League		Emperor's Cup		League Cup		Total	
2010	Tochigi SC	J2 League	24	3	0	0	-		24	3
2011	Tochigi SC	J2 League	20	1	2	0	-		22	1
2012	Tochigi SC	J2 League	27	4	1	0	-		28	4
2013	Tochigi SC	J2 League	24	4	0	0	-		24	4
2014	Tochigi SC	J2 League	19	6	1	0	-		20	6
2015	Tochigi SC	J2 League	26	5	0	0	-		26	5
2016	Tochigi SC	J3 League	9	0	0	0	-		9	0
Career total			149	23	4	0	0	0	153	23
