= Tatsuya Onodera =

Japanese footballer (born 1987)

Tatsuya Onodera 小野寺達也
Personal information
- Full name: Tatsuya Onodera
- Date of birth: August 4, 1987 (age 39)
- Place of birth: Kanagawa, Japan
- Height: 1.72 m (5 ft 7 1/2 in)
- Position: Midfielder

Team information
- Current team: Tegevajaro Miyazaki
- Number: 25

Youth career
- 2006–2009: Takushoku University

Senior career*
Years	Team	Apps	(Gls)
2010–2015	Tochigi SC	121	(6)
2016–2017	V-Varen Nagasaki	4	(0)
2017	→ Giravanz Kitakyushu (loan)	19	(0)
2018	Giravanz Kitakyushu	5	(0)
2019–	Tegevajaro Miyazaki	26	(1)
- * Club domestic league appearances and goals as of 23 February 2020

Tatsuya Onodera (小野寺 達也, Onodera Tatsuya; born August 4, 1987 in Kanagawa) is a Japanese football player. He currently plays for Giravanz Kitakyushu.

== Career statistics ==
Updated to 23 February 2020.

Appearances and goals by club, season and competition
Club	Season	League			Emperor's Cup		J.League Cup		Total	
Club	Season	Division	Apps	Goals	Apps	Goals	Apps	Goals	!Apps	Goals
Tochigi SC	2010	J2 League	5	0	0	0	—		5	0
Tochigi SC	2011	J2 League	9	0	1	0	—		10	0
Tochigi SC	2012	J2 League	29	3	1	0	—		30	3
Tochigi SC	2013	J2 League	5	0	1	0	—		6	0
Tochigi SC	2014	J2 League	40	2	0	0	—		40	2
Tochigi SC	2015	J2 League	33	1	1	0	—		34	1
V-Varen Nagasaki	2016	J2 League	4	0	1	0	—		5	0
Giravanz Kitakyushu	2017	J3 League	19	0	2	0	—		21	0
Giravanz Kitakyushu	2018	J3 League	5	0	—		—		5	0
Tegevajaro Miyazaki	2019	JFL	26	1	—		—		26	1
Career total			175	7	7	0	0	0	181	7
