= Takuya Taniyama =

Japanese karateka

- Born: 28 June 1965 (age 59); Osaka Prefecture, Japan
- Style: Shotokan Karate
- Teacher(s): Masatoshi Nakayama
- Rank: 6th Dan karate (JKA)

Takuya Taniyama (Taniyama Takuya, 28 June 1965) is a Japanese instructor of Shotokan karate. He has won the JKA's version of the world championships for kata. He has also won the JKA All-Japan championships for kata on four occasions, and for kumite on five occasions. He is currently an instructor with the Japan Karate Association.

== Biography ==
Takuya Taniyama was born in Osaka, Japan on 28 June 1965. He studied at Takushoku University. His karate training began during his 3rd year of elementary school.

== Competition ==
Takuya Taniyama has had considerable success in karate competition.

=== Major Tournament Success ===
- 50th JKA All Japan Karate Championship (2007) - 1st Place Kumite
- 49th JKA All Japan Karate Championship (2006) - 3rd Place Kata
- 9th Shoto World Cup Karate Championship Tournament (Tokyo, 2004) - 2nd Place Kata
- 47th JKA All Japan Karate Championship (2004) - 3rd Place Kumite; 3rd Place Kata
- 46th JKA All Japan Karate Championship (2003) - 1st Place Kata; 3rd Place Kumite
- 45th JKA All Japan Karate Championship (2002) - Tournament Grand Champion; 1st Place Kata; 2nd Place Kumite
- 44th JKA All Japan Karate Championship (2001) - Tournament Grand Champion; 1st Place Kumite; 2nd Place Kata
- 8th Shoto World Cup Karate Championship Tournament (Tokyo, 2000) - 1st Place Kata; 3rd Place Kumite
- 43rd JKA All Japan Karate Championship (2000) - 1st Place Kata
- 42nd JKA All Japan Karate Championship (1999) - Tournament Grand Champion; 1st Place Kata; 2nd Place Kumite
- 41st JKA All Japan Karate Championship (1998) - Tournament Grand Champion; 1st Place Kumite; 3rd Place Kata
- 7th Shoto World Cup Karate Championship Tournament (Paris, 1998) - 3rd Place Kata
- 6th Shoto World Cup Karate Championship Tournament (Osaka, 1996) - 3rd Place Kumite
- 39th JKA All Japan Karate Championship (1996) - 1st Place Kumite
- 38th JKA All Japan Karate Championship (1995) - 1st Place Kumite
- 37th JKA All Japan Karate Championship (1994) - 2nd Place Kumite
- 35th JKA All Japan Karate Championship (1992) - 2nd Place Kumite
