= Kunio Kobayashi (karateka) =

Japanese karateka

- Born: 5 July 1967; Tokyo, Japan
- Style: Shotokan Karate
- Teacher(s): Masatoshi Nakayama
- Rank: 7th Dan karate (JKA)

Kunio Kobayashi (Kobayashi Kunio, born 5 July 1967) is a Japanese instructor of Shotokan karate. He has won the JKA All-Japan championships for kata on 2 occasions and for kumite on 3 occasions. He is currently an instructor of the Japan Karate Association.

== Biography ==
Kunio Kobayashi was born in Tokyo, Japan on 5 July 1967. He studied at Komazawa University. His karate training began during his 1st year of junior high school.

== Competition ==
Kunio Kobayashi has had considerable success in karate competition.

=== Major Tournament Success ===
- 51st JKA All Japan Karate Championship (2008) - 1st Place Kata
- 10th Funakoshi Gichin Cup World Karate-do Championship Tournament (Sydney, 2006) - 2nd Place Kata
- 49th JKA All Japan Karate Championship (2006) - 2nd Place Kata
- 48th JKA All Japan Karate Championship (2005) - 1st Place Kata
- 9th Shoto World Cup Karate Championship Tournament (Tokyo, 2004) - 3rd Place Kata
- 47th JKA All Japan Karate Championship (2004) - 1st Place Kumite; 2nd Place Kata
- 46th JKA All Japan Karate Championship (2003) - 2nd Place Kata; 3rd Place Kumite
- 45th JKA All Japan Karate Championship (2002) - 1st Place Kumite; 3rd Place Kata
- 42nd JKA All Japan Karate Championship (1999) - 1st Place Kumite
- 41st JKA All Japan Karate Championship (1998) - 3rd Place Kumite
- 40th JKA All Japan Karate Championship (1997) - 3rd Place Kumite
- 6th Shoto World Cup Karate Championship Tournament (Osaka, 1996) - 3rd Place Kumite
- 39th JKA All Japan Karate Championship (1996) - 3rd Place Kumite
- 4th Shoto World Cup Karate Championship Tournament (Tokyo, 1992) - 3rd Place Kumite
- 34th JKA All Japan Karate Championship (1991) - 3rd Place Kumite
