= Minoru Kawawada =

Japanese karateka (born 1952)

- Born: 16 January 1952 (age 73); Ibaraki Prefecture, Japan
- Style: Shotokan Karate
- Teacher(s): Masatoshi Nakayama
- Rank: 7th Dan karate (JKA)

Minoru Kawawada (born 16 January 1952) is a Japanese master of Shotokan karate. He has won the JKA's version of the world championships for both kata and kumite, and has also won the JKA All-Japan Championships for kata on 2 occasions. He is currently the Vice General Manager of the Japan Karate Association Technical Division, and an instructor at their headquarters dojo, as well as the famous Hoitsugan dojo founded by Masatoshi Nakayama.

== Biography ==
Minoru Kawawada was born in Ibaraki Prefecture, Japan on 16 January 1952. He studied at Takushoku University. His karate training began during his 1st year of high school.

== Competition ==
Minoru Kawawada has had considerable success in karate competition.

=== Major Tournament Success ===
- 30th JKA All Japan Karate Championship (1987) - Tournament Grand Champion; 1st Place Kata; 3rd Place Kumite
- 29th JKA All Japan Karate Championship (1986) - 1st Place Kata
- 1st Shoto World Cup Karate Championship Tournament (Tokyo, 1985) - 1st Place Kumite; 1st Place Kata
- 28th JKA All Japan Karate Championship (1985) - 3rd Place Kumite
