= Andy Sherry =

British martial artist (born 1943)

- Born: 9 July 1943 (age 83); Liverpool
- Nationality: British
- Style: Shotokan Karate
- Trainer: Keinosuke Enoeda, Hirokazu Kanazawa
- Rank: 9th Dan

Other information
- Occupation: Former Chairman & Chief Instructor of the KUGB
- Notable club: Liverpool Red Triangle

Andy Sherry (born 9 July 1943) was a British martial artist. He was one of the most senior British practitioners of Karate and the retired chief instructor of the Karate Union of Great Britain. Sherry was unanimously convicted at Liverpool Crown Court of five criminal offences of a sexual nature relating to two victims, and sentenced to two years in prison and ordered to sign the Sex Offender Register for 10 years. However he has since been cleared of all charges at the Court of Appeal in September 2025, and a retrial which took place on 30 October 2025 finding Sherry not guilty.

== Karate ==
Sherry was born on 8 July 1943, in Liverpool. As a child, he showed interest in martial arts. After initially training in Judo and Jujutsu, he soon took an interest in Karate, starting his study of the art in 1959. In 1966, Sherry became the first person to pass a grading in the UK for a black belt in Shotokan Karate, having trained with JKA instructor Keinosuke Enoeda. He graded alongside his Red Triangle clubmate Joseph Chialton on 10 February 1966, with Jack Green earning his black belt later that year. Sherry, alongside Jack Green and Eddie Whitcher were also the first to be graded 2nd Dan in the United Kingdom, gaining their grade in 1967 at Crystal Palace.

In 1966, Sherry won the first British all-styles championship, beating competitors from all of Britain's karate styles. He went on, in 1968, to become European champion in kumite, an achievement he repeated in a number of subsequent years. He dominated the early KUGB Karate championships, winning the kata competition for the first four years running (1967–1970) and the kumite in 1968 and 1970.

On the competition circuit, Sherry was well known for using a yori-ashi gyaku-tsuki (lunging rear-hand punch) as his "trademark" manoeuvre, leading many competitors of the time to joke that he only knew one technique.

Retiring from competition in 1977, Sherry continued to coach the KUGB international competition squad until his retirement. He previously ran his own Karate club, the Liverpool Red Triangle. Sherry was awarded his 9th Dan ranking making him Britain's highest ranked Shotokan Karate practitioner in February 2013. He adjudicated the vast majority of black belt gradings throughout the years in many Karate clubs registered under the KUGB.

== Sexual assault allegations ==
In 2022, Sherry was charged with gross indecency with a child and inciting a child to commit an act of gross indecency against a boy in the 1980s. He also faces a count of sexual assault on a boy in 2012. Sherry was released on unconditional bail ahead of a further case management hearing on 13 March 2023.

A trial date was set for 4 September 2023, with the case expected to last up to three weeks. His trial began on 4 March 2024.

Sherry was unanimously convicted and found to be guilty of all five counts by a jury on 22 March 2024. Sherry was granted bail to await sentencing on 1 May 2024. Sherry was sentenced to two years in prison and ordered to sign the Sex Offender Register for 10 years following his sentencing on 1 May 2024.

Sherry was later cleared of all five charges relating to the former allegations, his legal representative has said "He's lost his good name, lost his reputation and lost his world standing."

== See also ==
- Shotokan
- Karate Union of Great Britain
