= Masahiko Tanaka (karateka) =

Japanese karateka

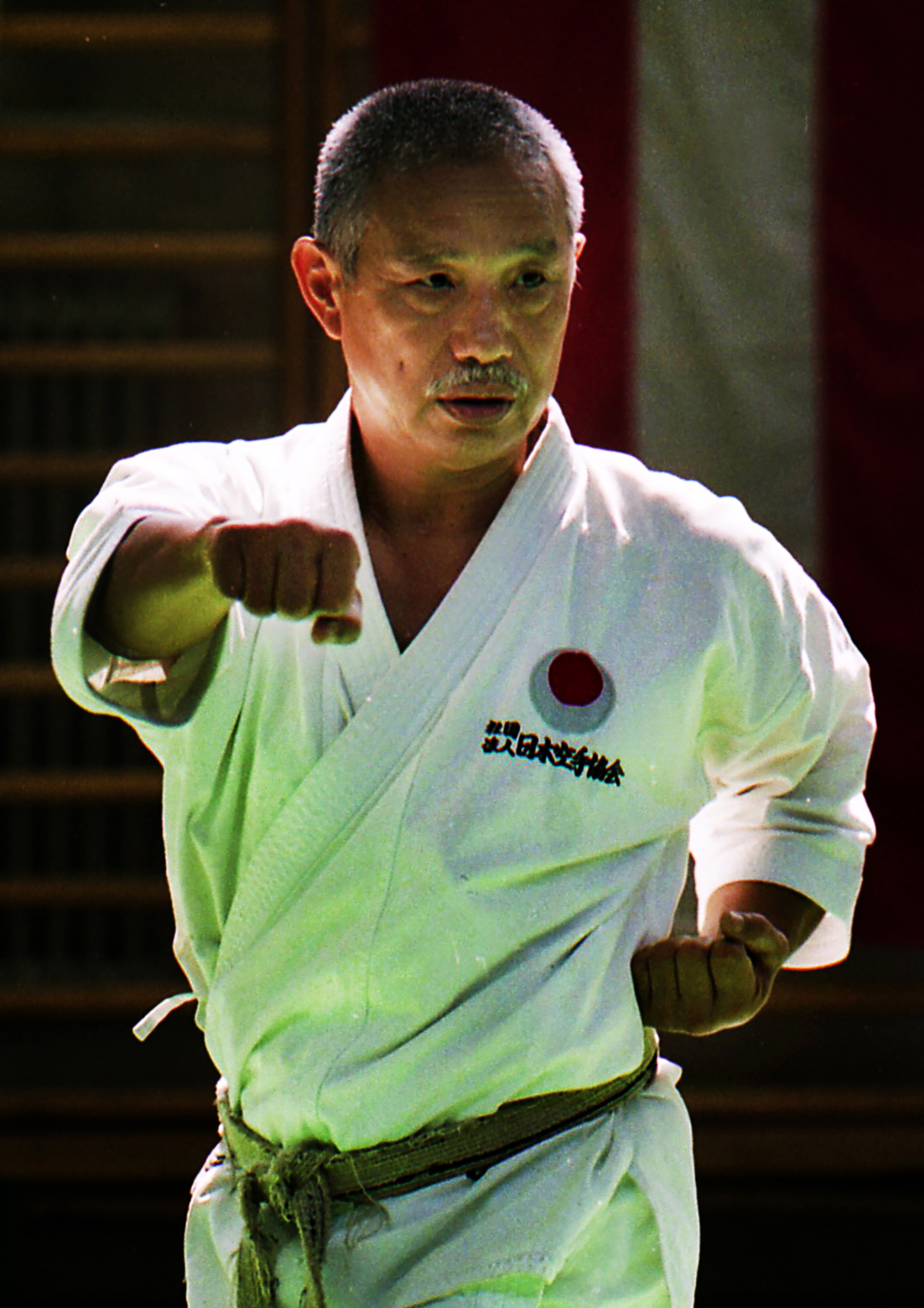
- (Photo: Gyöngyi Rózsavölgyi)
- Born: 24 February 1941; Tokyo, Japan
- Style: Shotokan Karate
- Teacher: Masatoshi Nakayama
- Rank: 8th dan karate (JKA)

Other information
- Notable students: Yuko Takahashi, Asuka Sasa, Ayano Takaki-Nakamura

Masahiko Tanaka (田中 昌彦, Tanaka Masahiko; born 24 February 1941) is a Japanese master of Shotokan karate. He won the first of his two IAKF world championship Kumite titles in 1975, was part of the Japan team to win the team Kumite title in the third IAKF world championship and was twice JKA All-Japan kumite champion. He became the national coach of Denmark in 1975 and in 1978 returned to Japan, where he currently manages the international affairs of the JKA.

== Early life ==
Masahiko Tanaka was born in Tokyo on February 24, 1941. He studied agriculture and veterinary medicine at Nihon University. After graduating he chose karate as his way of life and continued studying at the Japan Karate Association (JKA) honbu dojo (headquarters training hall) in Tokyo under Masatoshi Nakayama, then the JKA's Chief Instructor.

== Competition ==
Nakayama, former Chief instructor of the JKA wrote ‘There are very few competitors who can use both hands and feet with as much skill as Masahiko Tanaka’.

=== Major Tournament Success ===
- 3rd IAKF World Karate Championship (Bremen, 1980) - 1st Place Group Kumite
- 2nd IAKF World Karate Championship (Tokyo, 1977) - 1st Place Kumite
- 1st IAKF World Karate Championship (Los Angeles, 1975) - 1st Place Kumite
- 18th JKA All Japan Karate Championship (1975) - 1st Place Kumite
- 17th JKA All Japan Karate Championship (1974) - 1st Place Kumite
- 16th JKA All Japan Karate Championship (1973) - 3rd Place Kumite

== Publications ==
Tanaka is the author of the famous ‘Perfecting Kumite’ textbook and also featured in M. Nakayama's ‘Best Karate’ series.
