= Hideo Yamamoto (karateka) =

Japanese karateka

- Born: Tokyo, Japan
- Style: Shotokan Karate
- Teacher: Masatoshi Nakayama
- Rank: 7th dan karate (JKA)

Hideo Yamamoto (山本 英雄, Yamamoto Hideo) is a Japanese master of Shotokan karate. He won the IAKF world championship Kumite title in 1983, and he was twice JKA All-Japan kumite champion. He became the national coach of Japan.

== Competition ==
=== Major Tournament Success ===
- 4th IAKF World Karate Championship (1983) - - 1st Place Kumite
- 27th JKA All Japan Karate Championship (1984) - 1st Place Kumite
- 26th JKA All Japan Karate Championship (1983) - 1st Place Kumite
