= Tomio Imamura =

Japanese karateka

- Born: 7 October 1958 (age 66); Kagoshima Prefecture, Japan
- Style: Shotokan Karate
- Teacher(s): Masatoshi Nakayama
- Rank: 7th Dan karate (JKA)

Tomio Imamura (Imamura Tomio, 7 October 1958) is a Japanese master of Shotokan karate. He has won the JKA's version of the world championships for kumite on 2 occasions. He has also won the JKA All-Japan championships for kumite on 2 occasions. He is currently an instructor of the Japan Karate Association.

== Biography ==
Tomio Imamura was born in Kagoshima Prefecture, Japan on 7 October 1958. He studied at Takushoku University. His karate training began during his 1st year of university.

== Competition ==
Tomio Imamura has had considerable success in karate competition.

=== Major Tournament Success ===
- 36th JKA All Japan Karate Championship (1993) - 2nd Place Kumite
- 4th Shoto World Cup Karate Championship Tournament (Tokyo, 1992) - 1st Place Kumite
- 33rd JKA All Japan Karate Championship (1990) - 1st Place Kumite
- 32nd JKA All Japan Karate Championship (1989) - 2nd Place Kumite
- 31st JKA All Japan Karate Championship (1988) - 1st Place Kumite
- 2nd Shoto World Cup Karate Championship Tournament - 1st Place Kumite
- 30th JKA All Japan Karate Championship (1987) - 3rd Place Kumite
- 29th JKA All Japan Karate Championship (1986) - 2nd Place Kumite
- 26th JKA All Japan Karate Championship (1983) - 2nd Place Kumite
