= Mikio Yahara =

Japanese karateka

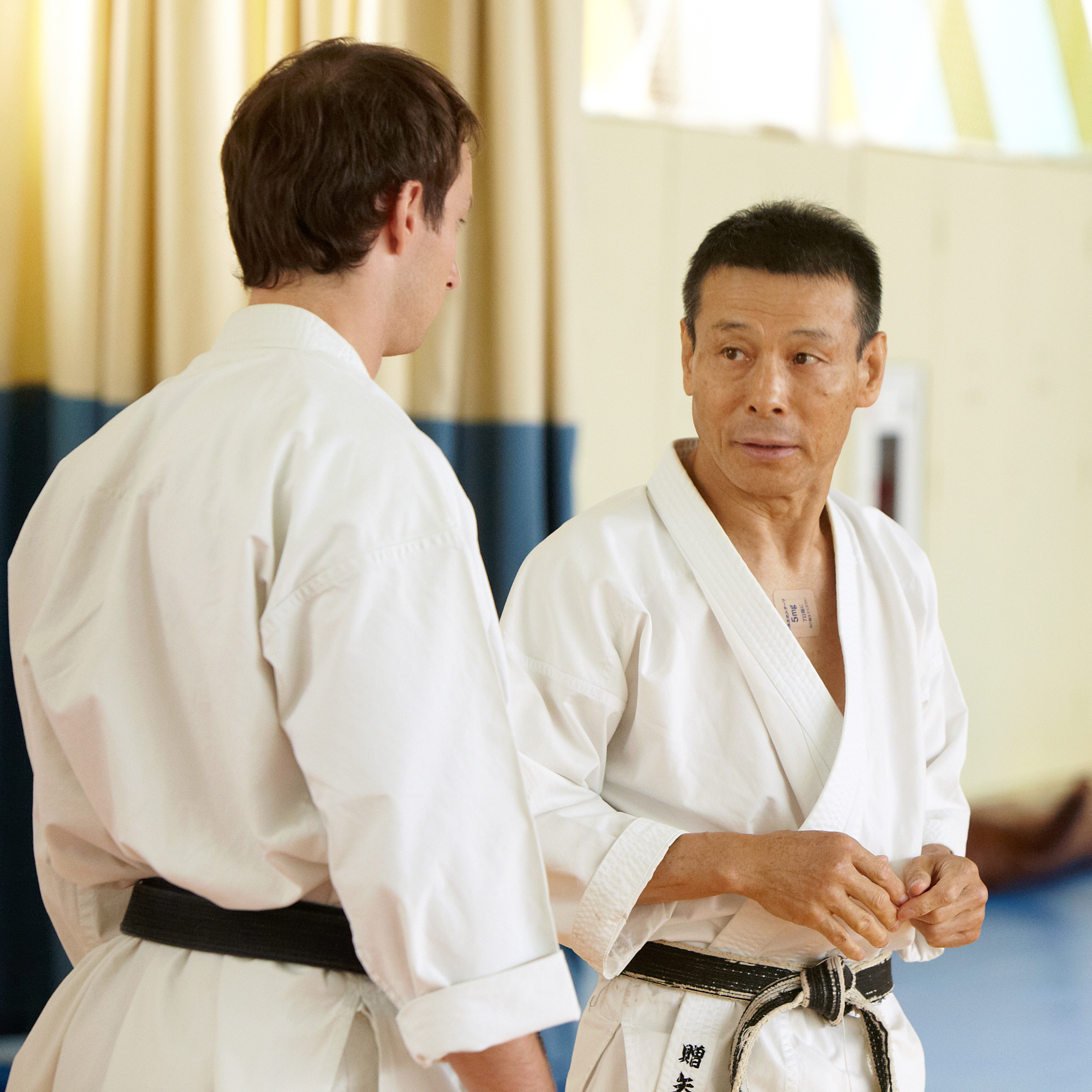
- Image of Mikio Yahara
- Born: April 4, 1947 (age 78); Ehime Prefecture
- Native name: 矢原美紀夫
- Style: Karate; Shotokan
- Rank: 10th dan

Other information
- Occupation: Karatenomichi World Federation grandmaster, I-S-S Ltd. (dignitary security) president and representative director
- University: Kokushikan University

Mikio Yahara (矢原美紀夫; born April 4, 1947, in Ehime Prefecture) is a Japanese karate expert of the Shotokan style. He holds the rank of 10th dan.

== Biography ==
Mikio Yahara was born in Ehime Prefecture in 1947 and has deep samurai roots. He started his martial art training in judo. After studying at Kokushikan University, he became a kenshusei (or junior instructor) with the Japan Karate Association and began his career as a competitive karateka. From 1974 to 1984, he achieved substantial success both in kumite and kata.

In 2000, Mikio Yahara founded the Karatenomichi World Federation (KWF) to pursue the true way of karate as a unique way of martial arts. As of 2023, he is the grandmaster of this large global organization spanning 63 countries.

Having earned the trust of political, business, and other important figures around the world, Grandmaster Yahara remains active today. Mikio Yahara leads International Security Service and utilizes karate to protect dignitaries.

== Tournament achievements ==
=== JKA All-Japan Championships ===
- 1984 - 3rd (kumite), 1st (kata), Grand Champion
- 1983 - 2nd (kata)
- 1982 - 3rd (kumite), 2nd (kata)
- 1981 - 2nd (kata)
- 1980 - 2nd (kata)
- 1979 - 3rd (kumite)
- 1978 - 2nd (kumite), 2nd (kata)
- 1976 - 3rd (kumite)
- 1975 - 2nd (kumite)
- 1974 - 1st (team kumite)

=== JKA/IAKF World Championships ===
- 1983 (Egypt) - 1st (team kumite), 1st (team kata), 2nd (kata)
- 1980 (Germany) - 1st (team kumite), 1st (team kata), 2nd (kata)
- 1977 (Japan) - 1st (team kumite), 1st (team kata), 2nd (kata)
- 1975 (USA) - 1st (team kumite), 1st (team kata)

=== Asian Championships ===
- 1974 (Singapore) - 1st (team kumite)
- 1983 (Singapore) - 1st (kumite), 1st (kata)

=== WUKO/JKA World Cup ===
- 1984 (Hungary) - 1st (kata), 1st (team kata)

== See also ==
- List of Shotokan organizations
