= Takenori Imura =

Japanese karateka

- Born: 14 July 1952; Shizuoka Prefecture, Japan
- Style: Shotokan Karate
- Teacher(s): Masatoshi Nakayama
- Rank: 7th Dan karate (JKA)

Takenori Imura (Imura Takenori, 14 July 1952) is a Japanese master of Shotokan karate. He has won the JKA's version of the world championships for kata on 2 occasions. He has also won the JKA All-Japan championships for kata on 5 occasions. He is currently an instructor of the Japan Karate Association.

== Biography ==
Takenori Imura was born in Shizuoka Prefecture, Japan on 14 July 1952. He studied at Japan University. His karate training began during his 1st year of university.

== Competition ==
Takenori Imura has had considerable success in karate competition.

=== Major Tournament Success ===
- 6th Shoto World Cup Karate Championship Tournament (Osaka, 1996) - 1st Place Group Kata
- 39th JKA All Japan Karate Championship (1996) - 1st Place Kata
- 38th JKA All Japan Karate Championship (1995) - 1st Place Kata
- 5th Shoto World Cup Karate Championship Tournament (Philadelphia, 1994) - 1st Place Kata
- 37th JKA All Japan Karate Championship (1994) - 1st Place Kata
- 36th JKA All Japan Karate Championship (1993) - 1st Place Kata
- 4th Shoto World Cup Karate Championship Tournament (Tokyo, 1992) - 2nd Place Kata
- 35th JKA All Japan Karate Championship (1992) - 1st Place Kata
- 34th JKA All Japan Karate Championship (1991) - 2nd Place Kata
- 33rd JKA All Japan Karate Championship (1990) - 3rd Place Kata
- 31st JKA All Japan Karate Championship (1988) - 2nd Place Kata
- 2nd Shoto World Cup Karate Championship Tournament - 1st Place Kata/Group Kata
- 29th JKA All Japan Karate Championship (1986) - 2nd Place Kata
- 24th JKA All Japan Karate Championship (1981) - 3rd Place Kata
- 23rd JKA All Japan Karate Championship (1980) - 3rd Place Kumite
