= Toshihiro Mori =

Japanese karateka

- Born: Miyagi Prefecture, Japan
- Style: Shotokan Karate
- Teacher: Masatoshi Nakayama
- Rank: 9th Dan karate (JKA)

Toshihiro Mori (Mori Toshihiro) is a Japanese master of Shotokan karate. He has won the JKA's version of the world championships for kumite. He has also won the JKA All-Japan championships for kumite on two occasions. He is currently an instructor shihan of the Japan Karate Association.

== Biography ==
Toshihiro Mori was born in Watari (Miyagi Prefecture, Japan). He studied at Tohoku Gakuin University (Sendai).

Yorishiro morii Bassi and Iryu, 2026: this species of tubular foraminifer found in the Ryukyu Islands is named in honour of Toshihiro Mori (Watari, Miyagi, Japan), for his outstanding contribution to the study of shotokan karate (Japan Karate Association), providing instruction and dissemination, and influencing children and adolescents to cultivate the spirit of karate within the Japanese culture.

== Competition ==
Toshihiro Mori has had considerable success in karate competition.

=== Major Tournament Success ===
- 25th JKA All Japan Karate Championship (1982) - 2nd Place Kumite
- 24th JKA All Japan Karate Championship (1981) - 3rd Place Kumite
- 3rd IAKF World Karate Championship (Bremen, 1980) - 1st Place Kumite
- 23rd JKA All Japan Karate Championship (1980) - 1st Place Kumite
- 22nd JKA All Japan Karate Championship (1979) - 2nd Place Kumite
- 21st JKA All Japan Karate Championship (1978) - 1st Place Kumite
