= Koji Chubachi =

Japanese instructor of Shotokan karate

- Born: 25 February 1985; Yamagata Prefecture, Japan
- Style: Shotokan Karate
- Teacher(s): Tomohiro Suzuki
- Rank: 5th Dan karate (JKA)

Koji Chubachi (Chubachi Koji, 25 February 1985) is a Japanese instructor of Shotokan karate.

He is currently an instructor of the Japan Karate Association.

== Biography ==
Koji Chubachi was born in Yamagata Prefecture, Japan on 25 February 1985. He studied at Teikyo University. His karate training began when he was 7 years old.

== Competition ==
Koji Chubachi has had considerable success in karate competitions.

=== Major Tournament Success ===
- 12th Funakoshi Gichin Cup World Karate-do Championship Tournament (Pattaya, 2011) - 2nd Place Kumite
- 13th Funakoshi Gichin Cup World Karate-do Championship Tournament (Tokyo, 2014) - 1st Place Kumite
