= Gichin Funakoshi =

Japanese karateka (1868–1957)

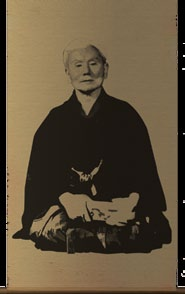
- Born: November 10, 1868; Shuri, Okinawa, Ryukyu Kingdom
- Died: April 26, 1957 (aged 88); Tokyo, Japan
- Native name: 船越 義珍
- Other names: Funakoshi Gichin (冨名腰 義珍), Shōtō (松涛)
- Style: Shōrei-ryū, Shōrin-ryū, and Shotokan Karate
- Teachers: Ankō Asato, Ankō Itosu, Matsumura Sōkon, Arakaki Seishō
- Rank: 5th dan, 10th dan (posthumous)

Other information
- Notable students: Gigō Funakoshi (his son), Hironori Ōtsuka, Isao Obata, Masatoshi Nakayama, Makoto Gima, Shigeru Egami, Tomosaburo Okano, Teruyuki Okazaki, Tetsuhiko Asai, Yasuhiro Konishi, Hidetaka Nishiyama, Tsutomu Ohshima, Taiji Kase, Mitsusuke Harada, Hirokazu Kanazawa, Won Kuk Lee, Masutatsu Oyama, Tetsuji Murakami, Yutaka Yaguchi, Won Kuk Lee, Byung Jik Ro, Choi Hong Hi, Keinosuke Enoeda

Gichin Funakoshi (船越 義珍, Funakoshi Gichin; November 10, 1868 – April 26, 1957) was the founder of Shotokan karate. He is known as a "father of modern karate". Following the teachings of Anko Itosu and Anko Asato, he was one of the Okinawan karate masters who introduced karate to the Japanese mainland in 1922, following its earlier introduction by his teacher Itosu. He taught karate at various Japanese universities and became honorary head of the Japan Karate Association upon its establishment in 1949. In addition to being a karate master, Funakoshi was an avid poet and philosopher. His son, Gigō Funakoshi, is widely credited with developing the foundation of the modern karate Shotokan style.

== Early life ==
Gichin Funakoshi was born on November 10, 1868, the year of the Meiji Restoration, in Shuri, Okinawa, to a Ryūkyūan Pechin. Funakoshi was born prematurely. His father's name was Gisu. He was of samurai lineage, from a family which in former times had been vassals of Ryukyu Dynasty nobles.

After entering primary school he became close friends with the son of Ankō Asato, a karate and Jigen-ryū master who would soon become his first karate teacher. Funakoshi's family was stiffly opposed to the Meiji government's abolition of the Japanese topknot, and this meant that he would be ineligible to pursue his goal of attending medical school (where topknots were banned), despite having passed the entrance examination. Being trained in both classical Chinese and Japanese philosophies and teachings, Funakoshi became an assistant teacher in Okinawa. During this time, his relations with the Asato family grew and he began nightly travels to the Asato family residence to receive karate instruction from Ankō Asato.

== Shotokan Karate ==
Funakoshi had trained in both of the popular styles of Okinawan karate of the time: Shōrei-ryū and Shōrin-ryū. Shotokan is named after Funakoshi's pen name, Shōtō (松涛), which means "waving pines". Kan means training hall or house, thus Shōtōkan (松涛館) referred to the "house of Shōtō". This name was coined by Funakoshi's students when they posted a sign above the entrance of the hall at which Funakoshi taught. In addition to being a karate master, Funakoshi was an avid poet and philosopher who would reportedly go for long walks in the forest where he would meditate and write his poetry.

Gichin Funakoshi performing the first moves of kata Heian Nidan.

By the late 1910s, Funakoshi had many students, of which a few were deemed capable of passing on their master's teachings. Continuing his effort to garner widespread interest in Okinawan karate, Funakoshi ventured to mainland Japan in 1917, and again in 1922. In 1922 Funakoshi (aged 53) and Makoto Gima (aged 26) were invited to the Kodokan by Judo Master Jigoro Kano to perform a karate demonstration. It was this demonstration that inevitably made karate popular in the mainland.

In 1930, Funakoshi established an association named Dai-Nihon Karate-do Kenkyukai to promote communication and information exchange among people who study karate-dō. In 1936, Dai-Nippon Karate-do Kenkyukai changed its name to Dai-Nippon Karate-do Shoto-kai. The association is known today as Shotokai, and is the official keeper of Funakoshi's karate heritage.

In 1936, Funakoshi built the first Shōtōkan dojo (training hall) in Tokyo. While on the Japanese mainland, he changed the written characters of karate to mean "empty hand" (空手) instead of "China hand" (唐手) (literally Tang dynasty) to downplay its connection to Chinese boxing. Karate had borrowed many aspects from Chinese boxing. Funakoshi also argued in his autobiography that a philosophical evaluation of the use of "empty" seemed to fit as it implied a way which was not tethered to any other physical object.

Funakoshi's re-interpretation of the character kara in karate to mean "empty" (空) rather than "Chinese" (唐) caused some tension with traditionalists back in Okinawa, prompting Funakoshi to remain in Tokyo indefinitely. In 1949 Funakoshi's students created the Japan Karate Association (JKA), with Funakoshi as the honorary head of the organization. However, in practise this organization was led by Masatoshi Nakayama. The JKA began formalizing Funakoshi's teachings. The first katas he incorporated into its curriculum were: the 3 Tekki, the 5 Heian, Bassai Dai, Kanku Dai, Empi, Jion, Jitte, Hangetsu, and Gankaku.

== Illness and death ==
Funakoshi developed osteoarthritis in 1948, and died on April 26, 1957. Cause of death is colon cancer.

== Legacy ==
Funakoshi published several books on karate including his autobiography, Karate-Do: My Way of Life. His legacy, however, rests in a document containing his philosophies of karate training now referred to as the niju kun, or "twenty principles". These rules are the premise of training for all Shotokan practitioners and are published in a work titled The Twenty Guiding Principles of Karate. Within this book, Funakoshi lays out 20 rules by which students of karate are urged to abide in an effort to "become better human beings". Funakoshi's Karate-Do Kyohan "The Master Text" remains his most detailed publication, containing sections on history, basics, kata, and kumite. The famous Shotokan Tiger by Hoan adorns the hardback cover.

Although Funakoshi wrote that there are no contests in Karate, his students of the Japan Karate Association pushed towards standardization and competition, leading to the first All Japan Karate Championships to be held in 1957, the same year of Funakoshi's death. Today, the JKA World Championships are named after the late master, now known as the Funakoshi Gichin Cup.

== Memorial ==
Memorial of Funakoshi at Engaku-ji temple in Kamakura, south of Tokyo

A memorial to Gichin Funakoshi was erected by the Shotokai at Engaku-ji, a temple in Kamakura, on December 1, 1968. Designed by Kenji Ogata the monument features calligraphy by Funakoshi and Sōgen Asahina (1891–1979), chief priest of the temple which reads Karate ni sente nashi (There is no first move in karate), the second of Funakoshi's Twenty Precepts. To the right of Funakoshi's precept is a copy of the poem he wrote on his way to Japan in 1922.

A second stone features an inscription by Nobuhide Ohama and reads:

Funakoshi Gichin Sensei, of karate-do, was born on November 10, 1868 in Shuri Okinawa. From about eleven years old he began to study to-te jutsu under Azato Anko and Itosu Anko. He practiced diligently and in 1912 became the president of the Okinawan Shobukai. In May 1922, he relocated to Tokyo and became a professional teacher of karate-do. He devoted his entire life to the development of karate-do. He lived out his eighty-eight years of life and left this world on April 26, 1957. Reinterpreting to-te jutsu, the Sensei promulgated karate-do while not losing its original philosophy. Like bugei (classical martial arts), so too is the pinnacle of karate “mu” (enlightenment): to purify and make one empty through the transformation from “jutsu” to “do”. Through his famous words "空手に先手なし" (karate ni sente nashi) meaning There is no first move in Karate and 空手は君子の武芸 (karate wa kunshi no bugei) meaning Karate is the martial art of intelligent people, Sensei helped us to better understand the term “jutsu.” In an effort to commemorate his virtue and great contributions to modern karate-do as a pioneer, we, his loyal students, organised the Shotokai and erected this monument at the Enkakuji. “Kenzen ichi” (“The fist and Zen are one”).

== Publications ==
- Funakoshi, Gichin (1922). Tō-te Ryūkyū Kenpō (唐手 : 琉球拳法).
- Funakoshi, Gichin (1925). Karate Jutsu (唐手術) (PDF). Archived from the original (PDF) on 2015-09-24.
- Funakoshi, Gichin (1935). Karate-Do Kyohan (空手道教範 ) (PDF). Archived from the original (PDF) on 2014-11-29.
- Funakoshi, Gichin (1973). Karate-Do Kyohan: The Master Text. Translated by Tsutomu Ohshima. Tokyo: Kodansha International. ISBN 978-0-87011-190-7.
- Funakoshi, Gichin (1975). The Twenty Guiding Principles of Karate: The Spiritual Legacy of the Master. Translated by John Teramoto. Tokyo: Kodansha International. ISBN 978-4-7700-2796-2.
- Funakoshi, Gichin (1981) [1975]. Karate-Do: My Way of Life. Tokyo: Kodansha International. ISBN 978-0-87011-463-2.
- Funakoshi, Gichin (1994) [1988]. Karate-Do Nyumon: The Master Introductory Text. Translated by John Teramoto. Tokyo: Kodansha International. ISBN 978-4-7700-1891-5.
- Funakoshi, Gichin (2001). Karate Jutsu: The Original Teachings of Master Funakoshi. Translated by John Teramoto. Tokyo: Kodansha International. ISBN 978-4-7700-2681-1.
- Funakoshi, Gichin (2010). The Essence of Karate. Translated by Richard Berger. Tokyo: Kodansha International. ISBN 978-4-7700-3118-1.
- Funakoshi, Gichin: Introduction to Karate, Translated by Henning Wittwer, 2023. ISBN 979-8375355658.

== See also ==
- List of Shotokan organizations
