= Koji Ogata =

Japanese karateka (born 1968)

- Born: 21 October 1968; Kyoto, Japan
- Style: Shotokan Karate
- Teacher(s): Masaaki Ueki
- Rank: 5th Dan karate (JKA)

Koji Ogata (Ogata Koji, 21 October 1968) is a Japanese instructor of Shotokan karate. He has won the JKA's version of the world championships for kumite on 2 occasions. He has also won the JKA All-Japan championships for kumite on 2 occasions. He is currently an instructor of the Japan Karate Association.

== Biography ==
Koji Ogata was born in Kyoto, Japan on 21 October 1968. He studied at Toyo University. His karate training began during his 2nd year of elementary school.

== Competition ==
Koji Ogata has had considerable success in karate competition.

=== Major Tournament Success ===
- 51st JKA All Japan Karate Championship (2008) - 3rd Place Kumite
- 10th Funakoshi Gichin Cup World Karate-do Championship Tournament (Sydney, 2006) - 1st Place Kumite
- 48th JKA All Japan Karate Championship (2005) - 1st Place Kumite
- 9th Shoto World Cup Karate Championship Tournament (Tokyo, 2004) - 1st Place Kumite
- 47th JKA All Japan Karate Championship (2004) - 3rd Place Kumite
- 46th JKA All Japan Karate Championship (2003) - 1st Place Kumite
- 45th JKA All Japan Karate Championship (2002) - 3rd Place Kumite
- 44th JKA All Japan Karate Championship (2001) - 2nd Place Kumite
- 8th Shoto World Cup Karate Championship Tournament (Tokyo, 2000) - 3rd Place Kumite
- 7th Shoto World Cup Karate Championship Tournament (Paris, 1998) - 2nd Place Kumite
- 40th JKA All Japan Karate Championship (1997) - 3rd Place Kumite
