= Katsutoshi Shiina =

Japanese Karateka

- Born: 21 November 1961 (age 64); Tokyo, Japan
- Native name: 椎名勝利
- Style: Shotokan karate
- Teacher: Masatoshi Nakayama
- Rank: 8th dan (JKA)

Other information
- University: Takushoku University

Katsutoshi Shiina (椎名勝利, Shiina Katsutoshi; born 21 November 1961) is a Japanese karateka of the Shotokan style.

In 2004, he won the Shoto World Cup for kata. He has reached the 8th dan in the Japan Karate Association (JKA) system.

As early as 2004, he was the general manager of the planning division at the JKA; in 2010, he instead became the general manager of the temporary personnel division. He remains an instructor with the JKA.

== Biography ==
Katsutoshi Shiina was born in Tokyo, Japan on 21 November 1961. He began practicing karate in his 5th year of elementary school, and later attended Takushoku University. His motto is "though my body seems not my soul is ready".

== Competition ==
Katsutoshi Shiina has had considerable success in karate competition.

- Shoto World Cup (Funakoshi Gichin Cup)
  - Kata
    - Winner (1): 2004 (Tokyo)
    - Third place (1): 2000 (Tokyo)
  - Kumite
    - Third place (1): 1994 (Philadelphia)
- JKA All Japan Karate Championship
  - Kata
    - Winner (2): 2001, 2004
    - Runner-up (1): 2002
    - Third place (1): 2000
  - Kumite
    - Winner (3): 1991, 1993, 1994
    - Runner-up (2): 1987, 2000
    - Third place (4): 1990, 1995, 1996, 2002
