= Seizo Izumiya =

Japanese karateka

- Born: 12 October 1961; Hokkaido, Japan
- Style: Shotokan Karate
- Teacher(s): Masatoshi Nakayama
- Rank: 7th Dan karate (JKA)

Seizo Izumiya (Izumiya Seizo, born 12 October 1961) is a Japanese master of Shotokan karate. He has won the JKA All-Japan championships for kata. He is currently an instructor of the Japan Karate Association.

== Biography ==
Seizo Izumiya was born in Hokkaido, Japan on 12 October 1961. He studied at Komazawa University. His karate training began during his 1st year of junior high school.

== Competition ==
Seizo Izumiya has had considerable success in karate competition.

=== Major Tournament Success ===
- 8th Shoto World Cup Karate Championship Tournament (Tokyo, 2000) - 2nd Place Kata
- 43rd JKA All Japan Karate Championship (2000) - 2nd Place Kata
- 42nd JKA All Japan Karate Championship (1999) - 2nd Place Kata
- 41st JKA All Japan Karate Championship (1998) - 2nd Place Kata
- 7th Shoto World Cup Karate Championship Tournament (Paris, 1998) - 2nd Place Kata
- 40th JKA All Japan Karate Championship (1997) - Tournament Grand Champion; 1st Place Kata; 2nd Place Kumite
- 37th JKA All Japan Karate Championship (1994) - 3rd Place Kumite
