= Karate Union of Great Britain =

Karate union in UK

- Abbreviation: KUGB
- Formation: 1966
- Type: Sports federation
- Headquarters: Liverpool, England
- Official language: English
- Chairman: John Bruce
- Website: KUGB Website

The Karate Union of Great Britain, or KUGB, is an association of Shotokan Karate clubs and Karateka operating across Great Britain, with some oversea affiliations. The 1960s saw a growth in the popularity of Karate, and the KUGB was founded in 1966 to be a democratic, not-for-profit organisation, and was the first single style organisation within the UK. Many other British Shotokan Karate organisations have since formed after splitting from the KUGB.

The KUGB is affiliated to the World Shotokan Karate-do Association (WSKA) as well as the European counterpart, the European Shotokan Karate-do Association (ESKA).

The KUGB operated as the British arm of the Japan Karate Association (JKA) until the death of chief instructor Keinosuke Enoeda Sensei in 2003. Subsequently, a disagreement regarding his successor resulted in the KUGB withdrawing from the JKA, with Sensei Andy Sherry being appointed Chief Instructor.

Andy Sherry held the role of Chairman up until 23 March 2021. Frank Brennan then held the role of Chairman until 2024.

The KUGB was amongst the karate organisations which joined Karate England, the national governing body set up by the British Sports Council to regulate competitive (WKF) karate (the style recognised by the International Olympic Committee as a candidate for Olympic status).

It is the largest single-style karate association in the UK. The KUGB is organised on a regional basis, within England there are 3 regions, Southern, Central, and Northern, along with Wales, Scotland, Ireland, and Northern Ireland. Each region has its own committee and chairman, and organises its own annual regional championships, which attract many entries from all ages.

Each year the KUGB organise a number of regional and national competitions and regularly send squads to represent them at international events, winning the senior male team kumite event at the 2007 World Shotokan Karate Association Championships and European Shotokan Karate Association Championships. The senior team retained their ESKA title in 2008 and the junior male team added to the success winning the 2008 ESKA Championships in Crawley Despite the competition successes, the teaching remains traditional as originally intended by Gichin Funakoshi.

As of 12 May 2024 Frank Brennan has resigned from his role of Chairman of the KUGB however he continues to be a key part of the Technical Committee. John Bruce has now been appointed as the Chairman of the KUGB as of 09 July 2024, the Vice Chair position of the KUGB has not changed and is still held by Rob Manning.

== See also ==
- Keinosuke Enoeda
- Terry O'Neill
- Billy Higgins
- Frank Brennan
