= Rikiya Iimura =

Japanese karateka

- Born: Ibaraki Prefecture, Japan
- Style: Shotokan Karate
- Teacher(s): Masaaki Ueki
- Rank: 2nd Dan karate (JKA)

Rikiya Iimura (Iimura Rikiya) is a Japanese instructor of Shotokan karate. He has won the JKA's version of the world championships for kumite. He is currently an instructor of the Japan Karate Association.

== Biography ==
Rikiya Iimura was born in Ibaraki Prefecture, Japan on . He studied at Taisho University.

== Competition ==
Rikiya Iimura has had success in karate competition.

=== Major Tournament Success ===
- 12th Funakoshi Gichin Cup World Karate-do Championship Tournament (Pattaya, 2011) - 1st Place Kumite
- 54th JKA All Japan Karate Championship (2011) - 3rd Place Kumite
