= Frank Brennan (karateka) =

British karateka

- Born: 6 May 1960 (age 66); Liverpool
- Nationality: British
- Style: Shotokan Karate
- Trainer: Keinosuke Enoeda, Andy Sherry
- Rank: 8th Dan

Other information
- Occupation: Technical Committee Member of the KUGB (Formerly Chairman of the KUGB)
- Notable relatives: Jim Brennan (Brother)
- Notable club: Liverpool Red Triangle
- Website: Sensei Frank Brennan - KUGB

Frank Brennan, is a Shotokan karateka born on 6 May 1960 in the City of Liverpool. He was a British karate champion in the 1970s and 1980s, winning a wide variety of titles both as an individual and as part of the KUGB team.

Always sport-oriented, Brennan took up gymnastics while at school. At the age of twelve he tried to join the Red Triangle Karate Club, but he was told to go and join the judo club for a year because he was too young. He started to train at the club in 1973 under the tuition of Andy Sherry and KUGB chief instructor Keinosuke Enoeda.

His competition career began in 1974 when he competed in the KUGB Northern Regional Championships as a 4th Kyū, entering and winning the junior kata event. His introduction to kumite was even more dramatic; in 1975, while fighting for the Red Triangle team, Bob Poynton broke his leg in one of the matches. The team had no reserves, so the young Brennan, now a brown belt who had only entered the kata event, was suddenly in the final of the team kumite event against Leeds. He fought one of Leeds' most experienced fighters, Andy Harris, and decisively beat him with a fast mawashi geri combination to achieve a Red Triangle win.

His first international appearance was with the KUGB squad in the European Championships in Sweden in 1978, where he came 2nd in the senior kata event. In Belgium the following year he won the Grand Championship of Europe, taking both kumite and kata events, later repeating this feat on three occasions.

As a fighter he is equally at home using hands or feet, often surprising opponents with dynamic combinations of the more unusual hand or foot techniques. As a senior member of the KUGB International Squad a highlight of his career was leading his team to victory in the 1990 World Shotokan Championships in Sunderland. He is held in great respect internationally - in an interview at the World Championships, the Japanese team coach, ex-world Champion Masahiko Tanaka said that the one man who the whole Japanese Team were specifically trained to beat was Frank Brennan.

Frank currently serves as a coach to the KUGB National Squad and has coached athletes who have gone on to become Junior European and World Champions.

He was elected as Vice Chair of the KUGB in 2009 and then Chairman in 2021. As of 12 May 2024 Frank Brennan has resigned from his role of Chairman of the KUGB following the conviction of former KUGB chairman, Andy Sherry, however he continues to be a key part of the Technical Committee.
