= Billy Higgins (karateka) =

British karateka (born 1945)

Billy Higgins BEM
- Born: William Higgins; 14 August 1945 (age 81); Bootle, England
- Style: Shotokan Karate
- Rank: 8th Dan

Other information
- Website: /https://www.sei-do-kan-karate.co.uk/

William Peter Higgins BEM (born 14 August 1945, in Bootle, England) is a British karateka and former kumite competitor. He holds an 8th-degree black belt from the KUGB, was a winner of multiple European championships, and a gold medalist in men's kumite with the British team at the 1975 World Karate Championships in Long Beach, California.

He is currently a karate instructor for the Karate Union of Great Britain.
