= Yoshiharu Osaka =

Japanese karateka

- Born: 8 September 1947 (age 77); Fukuoka Prefecture, Japan
- Style: Shotokan Karate
- Teacher(s): Masatoshi Nakayama
- Rank: 8th Dan karate (JKA)

Yoshiharu Osaka (Osaka Yoshiharu, born 8 September 1947) is a Japanese instructor of Shotokan karate. He has won the JKA's version of the world championships for kata on four occasions. He has also won the JKA All-Japan championships for kata on six occasions and for kumite on two occasions.

== Biography ==
Yoshiharu Osaka was born in Fukuoka Prefecture, Japan on 8 September 1947. He studied at Takushoku University. His karate training began during his first year of high school.

== Competition ==
Yoshiharu Osaka has had considerable success in karate competition.

=== Major tournament successes ===
- 26th JKA All Japan Karate Championship (1983) - 1st Place Kata
- 4th IAKF World Karate Championship (Egypt, 1983) - 1st Place Kata
- 25th JKA All Japan Karate Championship (1982) - 1st Place Kata
- 24th JKA All Japan Karate Championship (1981) - 1st Place Kata
- 3rd IAKF World Karate Championship (Bremen, 1980) - 1st Place Kata
- 23rd JKA All Japan Karate Championship (1980) - 1st Place Kata
- 22nd JKA All Japan Karate Championship (1979) - Tournament Grand Champion; 1st Place Kata; 3rd Place Kumite
- 21st JKA All Japan Karate Championship (1978) - Tournament Grand Champion; 1st Place Kata; 3rd Place Kumite
- 2nd IAKF World Karate Championship (Tokyo, 1977) - 1st Place Kata
- 19th JKA All Japan Karate Championship (1976) - 1st Place Kumite
- 1st IAKF World Karate Championship (Los Angeles, 1975) - 1st Place Kata
- 18th JKA All Japan Karate Championship (1975) - 2nd Place Kata; 3rd Place Kumite
- 17th JKA All Japan Karate Championship (1974) - 2nd Place Kata
- 16th JKA All Japan Karate Championship (1973) - 2nd Place Kata
- 15th JKA All Japan Karate Championship (1972) - 2nd Place Kumite
- 13th All Japan Student Karate Championship (1969) - 1st Place Kumite
