= Sadamu Uriu =

Brazilian karateka

Sadamu Uriu (September 20, 1929 – November 30, 2020) was the Honor President of the Brazilian Shotokan Karate Confederation (CBKS), and the man responsible for first introducing karate into Brazil. He represented the Japan Karate Shotorenmei, Tetsuhiko Asai's organization, in Brazil.
