= Japan Karate Association =

Shotokan karate organization

- Abbreviation: JKA
- Formation: May 27, 1949
- Type: Sports federation
- Headquarters: 2-23-15 Koraku, Bunkyo-ku, Tokyo JAPAN 112-0004
- Members: Japan Karate Federation, World Karate Federation
- Official language: Japanese, English
- Shuseki Shihan (Chief Instructor): Masaaki Ueki, 10th Dan (Deceased July 14, 2024)
- Website: www.jka.or.jp

The Japan Karate Association (日本 空手 協会; Nihon Karate Kyokai; JKA; sometimes referred to simply as Kyokai 協会 in Japan) is one of the oldest global Shotokan karate organizations in the world.

== Origins ==
Gichin Funakoshi played a major role in introducing karate from Okinawa to Japan, adjusted to reduce injury and merged with approaches for athletic training. On May 27, 1949, some of his senior students including Isao Obata, Masatoshi Nakayama, and Hidetaka Nishiyama, formed a karate organization dedicated to research, promotion, events management, and education: the Japan Karate Association. Funakoshi, then around 80 years old, held a position equivalent to chief instructor emeritus, with Nakayama as the chief instructor.

The JKA emerged from karate clubs at Japanese universities located in the Tokyo region. Most of these universities, however, distanced themselves from the JKA during the 1950s. Takushoku University always kept strong ties with the JKA, being the alma mater of many of the senior JKA instructors, such as Nakayama, Nishiyama, Okazaki, Asai, Kanazawa, and Enoeda, who were responsible for the JKA's consolidation during the 1960s and 1970s.

General uneasiness on how karate was taught by the JKA instructors and disagreements on Funakoshi's funeral arrangements in 1957 motivated some of the senior karateka connected with Funakoshi, but not associated with the JKA, such as Shigeru Egami, Genshin Hironishi, and Tsutomu Ohshima, to form their own organizations, such as Shotokai and Shotokan Karate of America). They claimed to practice a version of Shotokan karate closer to what Funakoshi taught, as compared to the JKA style. The JKA Shotokan approach is also based on Funakoshi's karate, but with significant adaptations introduced mostly by Nakayama, who was JKA chief instructor until his death in 1987. Under Nakayama's leadership, a generation of respected instructors spread karate worldwide, guided from the JKA headquarters in Tokyo.

Nakayama's books, which include Dynamic Karate and the Best Karate series, are fundamental reference materials on Shotokan karate as practiced under the JKA. Clive Nicol, in his classic book Moving Zen, describes the karate practice at the JKA's honbu dojo (headquarters training hall) in Tokyo during the early 1960s, from his unique perspective as a western karate student going from white to black belt in a few years.

== Splinter groups ==
The JKA experienced several divisions from the 1970s onwards. Notable splinter groups formed as follows:

- In 1974, one of the founders of JKA, Hidetaka Nishiyama, broke away from JKA and created the International Traditional Karate Federation (国際伝統空手連盟, Kokusai Dentō Karate Renmei) or ITKF.
- In 1977, JKA instructor Shiro Asano formed his own organization, and invited master Hirokazu Kanazawa to take his place as chief instructor. The group is now known as Shotokan Karate-Do International Federation (SKIF).
- Following Nakayama's death in 1987, the JKA experienced a turbulent period, both at the Tokyo headquarters and worldwide. Taiji Kase and Hiroshi Shirai (notable student of Hidetaka Nishiyama), both senior JKA instructors in Europe quit to form the World Union of Karate-Do Organizations. Taketo Okuda, JKA chief instructor in Brazil, quit to focus on his own organization, Butoku-kan.
- In 1990, a legal dispute started between two groups about the control of JKA. One group was led by Tetsuhiko Asai, the other by Nobuyuki Nakahara. After several court rulings, the issue was ultimately settled by the Japanese Supreme Court on June 10, 1999, in favor of Nakahara's group, which included Masaaki Ueki and Masahiko Tanaka. The other group, led by Tetsuhiko Asai, JKA chief instructor after Nakayama, and including Keigo Abe and Mikio Yahara, left JKA to form other organizations: Japan Karate Shotorenmei, Japan Shotokan Karate Association, and Karatenomichi World Federation, respectively.
- In 2003, a disagreement regarding the successor to Keinosuke Enoeda Sensei resulted in the Karate Union of Great Britain (KUGB) withdrawing from the JKA. The KUGB operated as the British arm of the Japan Karate Association (JKA) until the death of chief instructor Keinosuke Enoeda Sensei in 2003.
- In 2007, the International Shotokan Karate Federation (ISKF), with headquarters in the US, led by Teruyuki Okazaki, 10th dan and one of the most senior JKA instructors, became independent. However, by 2010 at least two senior Instructors returned to the JKA.
- In 2009, Takahashi Shunsuke broke away from JKA Australia to form the TSKF Australia (Traditional Shotokan Karate-Do Federation). TSKF joined Teruyuki Okazaki's ISKF in 2011.
- By 2011, it was acknowledged that Masao Kawasoe, 7th Dan JKA, had returned to the JKA.

Due to these divisions, there is today the notion of a separate JKA karate style—that is, Shotokan karate that follows the JKA tradition to a large extent, but is taught by instructors who are not officially affiliated with JKA (though most of them are former JKA instructors and graduates).

== Kenshusei (instructor intern) training program ==
In 1956, the JKA started its kenshusei instructor intern training program at the JKA honbu dojo, in Yotsuya, Tokyo, which had been built in 1955. This program was instituted by Nakayama Masatoshi. The training program has promoted the consistency and quality control of JKA training practices over the years, graduating some of the world's most well known karateka (practitioners of karate), as listed below.

=== Graduates ===
The following table lists JKA kenshusei training program graduates in order of year of graduation. The reported rank of graduates no longer with the JKA is that from their current organization. Such rank is not necessarily recognized by the JKA.

Name	Year of Graduation	Rank	Position
Mikami Takayuki	1957	9th dan	USA JKA/AF Southern
Takaura Eiji	1957		
Kanazawa Hirokazu	1957	10th dan	Founder SKIF, deceased Dec 9, 2019
Tsushima Toshio	1958		
Yaguchi Yutaka	1958	9th dan	USA ISKF Mountain States
Ouchi Kyo	1959		
Sato Masaki	1959		
*Saito Shigeru	1959		
Inaba Mitsue	1960		
Kano Masahiko	1960		
Watanabe Gunji	1960		
*Ogata Kyoji	1960		
Kisaka Katsuharu	1961	8th dan	USA - JKA New Jersey since 1967 (current)
Nakaya Ken	1961		
Ogawa Eiko	1961		
Ueki Masaaki	1961	10th dan	HQ Shihan Chief Instructor Worldwide (Deceased July 14, 2024)
Enoeda Keinosuke	1961	9th dan	Deceased March 29, 2003
*Miyazaki Satoshi	1961	8th dan	Deceased May 31, 1993
*Mori Osamu	1961		
*Takahashi Yoshimasa	1961		
*Majima Kenshiro	1962		
Sakai Ryusuke	1962	8th dan	
Jitsuhara Shoji	1963		
Ochi Hideo	1963	9th dan	DJKB ("JKA Germany")
Takahashi Yasuoki	1963		
Itaya Michihisa	1963	6th dan	South America JKA - "Deceased 1972"
Abe Keigo	1965	9th dan	Japan JSKA
Oishi Takeshi	1965	9th dan	HQ Chief Instructor
*Tabata Yukichi	1965		
Takashina Shigeru	1966	8th dan	USA JKA/WFA Deceased September 3, 2013
Kawazoe Masao	1967	8th Dan (Also Chief Instructor ITKF)	
Higashi Kunio	1967		
Iida Norihiko	1967		
Okamoto Hideki	1967	8th dan	Egypt - "Deceased 2009".
Takahashi Shunsuke	1967	8th dan	Chief Instructor TSKF Australia
Yano Kenji	1967		
Okuda Taketo	1967	10th dan	Butoku-kan (Brazil)
Baba Isamu	1970		
Horie Teruo	1971		
Nishino Shuhei	1971		
*Hayakawa Norimasa	1971		
Kanegae Kenji	1972		
Osaka Yoshiharu	1972	8th dan	HQ Full-Time Instructor
Sato Teruo	1974		
Mori Toshihiro	1975		
Imura Takenori	1977	8th dan	HQ Full-Time Instructor
Kurasako Kenro	1977	7th dan	HQ Full-Time Instructor
Minoru Kawawada	1978	7th dan	HQ Full-Time Instructor
Komaki Masaki	1978		
Omura Fujikiyo	1978	7th dan	JKA Thailand
Fukami Akira	1979		
Kaneko Taneaki	1979		
Sakata Masashi	1979		
Abe Miwako	1980		
Tsuchii Takayuki	1980		
Yamamoto Hideo	1980		
Ohta Yoshinobu	Attendee	8th Dan	Head JKA England
Ogura Yasunori	1982	8th dan	HQ Vice Chief Instructor
Imamura Tomio	1983	8th dan	HQ Vice Chief Instructor
Kashiwagi Nobuyuki	1984		
Koike Tsuyoshi	1984		
Yokomichi Masaaki	1984		
Izumiya Seizo	1986	6th dan	HQ Full-Time Instructor
Shiina Katsutoshi	1986	8th dan	HQ Full-Time Instructor
Hanzaki Yasuo	1987	7th dan	HQ Full-Time Instructor
Nakamura Yoko	1987		
Naka Tatsuya	1989	7th dan (2012)	HQ Full-Time Instructor
Noda Kenichi	1990		
Taniyama Takuya	1990	7th dan	HQ Full-Time Instructor
*Imai Hiromitsu	1991		
Takahashi Satoshi	1992	7th dan	HQ Full-Time Instructor
Kobayashi Kunio	1993	7th dan	HQ Full-Time Instructor
Ogata Koji	1994	5th dan	HQ Full-Time Instructor
Walter Crockford	1996	5th dan	JKA Canada
Ikenaga Atsushi	1996		
Hirayama Yuko	1998	7th dan	HQ Full-Time Instructor
Okuma Koichiro	1998	7th dan	HQ Full-Time Instructor
Iwasawa Mayumi	1998	3rd dan	HQ Secretariat
Enda O'Toole	1998	3rd dan	
Aragaki Misako	2003	3rd dan	HQ Secretariat
Ubukata Koji	2003		
Yamada Satomi	2004		
Nemoto Keisuke	2004	6th dan	HQ Full-Time Instructor
Okuie Satomi	2004	6th dan	HQ Full-Time Instructor
Kurihara Kazuaki	2004	6th dan	HQ Full-Time Instructor
Shimizu Ryosuke	2004	6th dan	HQ Full-Time Instructor
Kumeta Riki	2008		

=== Note ===
This list is incomplete. For instance, it does not include some members who were expelled or resigned from the JKA see below:

- Kisaka Katsuharu (Katsuya) 8th dan JKA Instructor JKA of New Jersey, US (current)
- Abe Keigo, 9th dan (former JKA HQ instructor) JSKA Chief Instructor
- Aramoto Nobuyuki, 8th dan (former JKA instructor)
- Asai Tetsuhiko, 10th dan (former HQ JKA instructor) JKS/IJKA Chief instructor (passed)
- Inaba Tsuneyuki, 7th dan (former JKA instructor)
- Isaka Akito, 7th dan (former JKA instructor) KWF
- Ishimine Minoru, 7th dan (former JKA instructor)
- Kagawa Masao, 9th dan (former JKA instructor) JKS Chief Instructor)
- Kanayama Kosho, 7th dan (former JKA instructor) (Chief of Domestic Department JKS)
- Mizuno Yoshihisa, 8th dan (former JKA instructor)
- Naito Takashi, 7th dan (Has left E.T.K.F & returned to JKA)
- Tamang Pemba, 8th dan (former JKA HQ instructor) NSKF Chief Instructor
- Yahara Mikio, 10th dan (former JKA HQ instructor) KWF Chief Instructor
- Yamaguchi Tōru, 9th dan (former JKA instructor) (founder of JKSF)
- Yamaguchi Takashi, 8th dan (former JKA instructor) (Chief of International Department JKS)
- Kanazawa Hirokazu, 10th dan (former JKA HQ instructor) Chief instructor SKIF
- Kase Yasuharu, 10th dan (former JKA HQ instructor) Chief Instructor SRKH (passed)
- Kasuya Hitoshi, 9th dan (former JKA instructor) Chief Instructor WSKF
- Kato Sadashige, 9th ‘’Dan’’ (former JKA instructor) (passed)
- Katsumata (Suzuki) Yutaka, 7th dan (former JKA instructor)
- Shirai Hiroshi, 10th dan (former JKA instructor) WSKA
- Tatetsu Meicho, 7th dan (former JKA instructor)
- Amos Richard, 8th dan (former JKA HQ instructor) Chief Instructor WTKO)
- Maeda Eiji, 6th dan (former JKA HQ instructor)
- Kawasaki Norio 6th dan (former JKA HQ instructor)
- Koike Yutaka 6th dan (former JKA HQ instructor)
- Fischer Malcolm 6th dan (former JKA HQ instructor)
- Montoya Leon 5th dan (former JKA HQ instructor)

The list at the JKA's website, which includes most members who left or were expelled, may also be incomplete. The JKA has not included some former members who have completed the course and are not currently affiliated with JKA. In addition, during the troubled period between 1990 and 1999 each JKA faction held its own instructors' course. Currently, the JKA does not recognize graduates from the instructors' courses led by the JKS (Japan Karate Shoto Federation, which also held the name JKA between 1990 and 1999).

Karateka such as Dave Hazard (UK), Ennio Vezzuli (Brazil), Nigel Jackson (South Africa), Peté Pacheco (Portugal), Malcolm Fisher (Canada), Leon Montoya (Colombia), Richard Amos (UK, US), Pascal Lesage (France) and others, are mentioned in karate forums as having completed the JKA instructors' course (or having had substantial participation in it) but do not appear on the list of graduates as published in 2008 on the JKA's website.

In addition, the list does not include graduate instructors from the instructor programmes of splinter groups such as JKS and KWF, examples being Otsuka Masamichi (KWF - Japan), Langley Scott (JKS, now HDKI Ireland), Koike Yutaka (JKS - Japan), Inada Yasuhisa (JKS - Japan), Kyle Kamal Helou (JKS - Lebanon), Matsue Takeo (JKS- Japan), Makita Takuya (JKS - Japan), Nagaki Shinji (JKS - Japan).

== Competition ==
Although Gichin Funakoshi wrote that there are no contests in Karate, Nakayama Masatoshi's teachings led to a more competitive approach to the training and in 1957 the first All Japan Karate Championship was held, and has been held annually since.

=== World championships ===
In addition, the JKA has organised a number of international tournaments. Considered to be the JKA's World Championships it is now known as the Funakoshi Gichin Cup:

Year	Tournament name	Location
1975	1st IAKF World Championships	(United States) Los Angeles, USA
1977	2nd IAKF World Championships	Tokyo, Japan
1980	3rd IAKF World Championships	Bremen, West Germany
1983	4th IAKF World Championships	Cairo, Egypt
1985	1st ShotoCup	Tokyo, Japan
1987	2nd ShotoCup	Brisbane, Australia
1990	3rd ShotoCup	Sunderland, England
1992	4th ShotoCup	Tokyo, Japan
1994	5th ShotoCup	(United States) Philadelphia, USA
1996	6th ShotoCup	Osaka, Japan
1998	7th ShotoCup	Paris, France
2000	8th ShotoCup	Tokyo, Japan
2004	9th ShotoCup	Tokyo, Japan
2006	10th Funakoshi Gichin Cup World Karate-do Championship	Sydney Olympic Park Sports Centre, Sydney, Australia
2009	11th Funakoshi Gichin Cup World Karate-do Championship†	Nihon Budo-kan, Tokyo, Japan
2011	12th Funakoshi Gichin Cup World Karate-do Championship	Pattaya, Thailand
2014	13th Funakoshi Gichin Cup World Karate-do Championship	Nihon Budo-kan, Tokyo, Japan
2017	14th Funakoshi Gichin Cup Karate World Championship	(Republic of Ireland) Limerick, Ireland
2020	15th Funakoshi Gichin Cup Karate World Championship‡	Takasaki, Japan
2024	16th Funakoshi Gichin Cup Karate World Championship	Takasaki, Japan

†Cancelled due to the 2008 financial crisis.

‡Cancelled due to the COVID-19 pandemic.

==== Male Kumite ====
Year	Champion	Runner-up	3rd Place
1975	(Japan) Masahiko Tanaka	(Japan) Takashi Oishi	(United Kingdom) Billy Higgins
1977	(Japan) Masahiko Tanaka	(Italy) De Michelis	(East Germany) Willrodt
1980	(Japan) Toshihiro Mori	(Socialist Federal Republic of Yugoslavia) Dusan Dacic	(East Germany) Hoffman
1983	(Japan) Hideo Yamamoto	(Italy) Guazzaroni	(Egypt) Hosny Gabr
1985	(Japan) Minoru Kawawada	(Japan) Masaaki Yokomichi	(Japan) Takayuki Tsuchii/ (Japan) Masao Kagawa
1987	(Japan) Tomio Imamura	(United Kingdom) Frank Brennan	(United Kingdom) George Best/ (Italy) Marco Barone
1990	(Japan) Masao Kagawa	(United Kingdom) Ronnie Christopher	(Belgium) Fillipo Allata / (Sweden) Jensen
1992	(Japan) Tomio Imamura	(United Kingdom) Frank Brennan	(Japan) Kunio Kobayashi / (Japan) Tatsuya Naka
1994	(South Africa) Pavlo Protopapa	(Belgium) Jeannot Mulolo	(South Africa) Colin Smith / (Japan) Katsutoshi Shiina
1996	(Canada) Don Sharp	(Japan) Toshihito Kokubun	(Japan) Kunio Kobayashi / (Japan) Takuya Taniyama
1998	(Japan) Toshihito Kokubun	(Japan) Koji Ogata	(Switzerland) Pierre Toudjip / (Belgium) Jeannot Mulolo
2000	(Japan) Toshihito Kokubun	(South Africa) Johan LaGrange	(Japan) Takuya Taniyama / (Japan) Koji Ogata
2004	(Japan) Koji Ogata	(Sweden) Miroslav Femic	(Japan) Ohkuma Kouichiro / (South Africa) Johan LaGrange
2006	(Japan) Koji Ogata	(Brazil) Chinzo Machida	(Japan) Nemoto Keisuke / (Japan) Ohkuma Kouichiro
2011	(Japan) Rikiya Iimura	(Japan) Koji Chubachi	(Japan) Nemoto Keisuke / (Russia) Andrey Mazurov
2014	(Japan) Koji Chubachi	(Japan) Rikiya Iimura	(Japan) Nemoto Keisuke / (Thailand) Supa Ngamphuengphit
2017	(Chile) Rodrigo Rojas	(Japan) Okada Yasunori	(Japan) Ueda Daisuke/ (Japan) Yusuke Haga
2024	(Japan) Hikaru Hirose	(Japan) Tatsuro Igarashi	(Japan) Yuya Oosawa/ (Japan) Yusuke Haga

==== Male Kata ====
Year	Champion	Runner-up	3rd Place
1975	(Japan) Yoshiharu Osaka	(Italy) Fugazza	(East Germany) Strauff
1977	(Japan) Yoshiharu Osaka	(Japan) Mikio Yahara	(Italy) Fugazza
1980	(Japan) Yoshiharu Osaka	(Japan) Mikio Yahara	(Greece) Karamitsos
1983	(Japan) Yoshiharu Osaka	(Japan) Mikio Yahara	(Egypt) Saedd El Herem
1985	(Japan) Minoru Kawawada	(Japan) Masao Kagawa	(Japan) Akira Fukami
1987	(Japan) Takenori Imura	(Japan) Masao Kagawa	(Japan) Okazaki Hiroyoshi
1990	(Japan) Tomoyuki Aihara	(United Kingdom) Frank Brennan	(Japan) Masao Kagawa
1992	(Japan) Tomoyuki Aihara	(Japan) Imura Takenori	(Japan) Yuji Hashiguchi
1994	(Japan) Imura Takenori	(Japan) Okazaki Hiroyoshi	(Japan) Tomoyuki Aihara
1996	(Japan) Imura Takenori	(Japan) Yuji Hashiguchi	(Japan) Tomoyuki Aihara
1998	(Japan) Yuji Hashiguchi	(Japan) Seizo Izumiya	(Japan) Takuya Taniyama
2000	(Japan) Takuya Taniyama	(Japan) Seizo Izumiya	(Japan) Katsutoshi Shiina
2004	(Japan) Katsutoshi Shiina	(Japan) Takuya Taniyama	(Japan) Kobayashi Kunio
2006	(Japan) Kurihara Kazuaki	(Japan) Kobayashi Kunio	(Japan) Saitoh Yuki
2011	(Japan) Kurihara Kazuaki	(Japan) Naoto Maruoka	(Japan) Hideki Hukuhara
2014	(Japan) Hidemoto Kurihara	(Japan) Daisuke Ueda	(Japan) Kurihara Kazuaki
2017	(Japan) Kurihara Kazuaki	(Japan) Hidemoto Kurihara	(Japan) Yushi Hakizume
2024	(Japan) Kaishi Hakizume	(Japan) Hidemoto Kurihara	(Japan) Yushi Hakizume

==== Female Kumite ====
Year	Champion	Runner-up	3rd Place
1975	NA	NA	NA
1977	NA	NA	NA
1980	NA	NA	NA
1983	NA	NA	NA
1985	NA	NA	NA
1987	NA	NA	NA
1990	(Japan) Yuko Hasama	(Netherlands) L. Zelissen	(United Kingdom) Karen Findley / (Japan) Keiko Kawano
1992	(Japan) Yukiko Yoneda	(Japan) Yoshimi Naoko	(Japan) Sakurako Sasaki / (Japan) Keiko Kawano
1994	(Japan) Hiromi Hasama	(Japan) Mayumi Baba	(Japan) Kimiyo Nakamura / Daud Nilawati (Indonesia)
1996	(Japan) Hiromi Hasama	(Japan) Mayumi Baba	(Japan) Shoko Sakuragi / (Japan) Yuko Okuda
1998	(Japan) Mayumi Baba	(United Kingdom) Caroline Quansum	(United Kingdom) Colette Glynn / (Japan) Hiromi Hasama
2000	(Japan) Hiromi Hasama	(Japan) Yuko Okuda	(South Africa) Christy Cauvin / (Japan) Mayumi Baba
2004	(Japan) Okuie Satomi	(Japan) Takahashi Yuko	(Socialist Federal Republic of Yugoslavia) Tatjana Nikolic / (Hungary) Krisztina Zsigmond
2006	(Japan) Yuko Takahashi	(Japan) Okuda Yuko	(Australia) Tracy Pearce / (Australia) Storm Wheatley
2011	(Japan) Asumi Isiduka	(Sweden) Glusa Akdag	(Russia) Sergeeva Alla / (Venezuela) Josmaira Quiroz
2014	(Japan) Taguchi Satoshitama	(Japan) Mai Shiina	(Japan) Yuki Ito / (Czech Republic) Cifkova Petra
2017	(Japan) Shiina Mai	(Japan) Amano Minori	(Argentina) Castaneda Jeanette / (Japan) Akiyama Kyoko
2024	(Japan) Hinako Kitagawa	(Japan) Moe Yoshida	(Japan) Kyoko Akiyama/ (Canada) Alessandra Longo

==== Female Kata ====
Year	Champion	Runner-up	3rd Place
1975	NA	NA	NA
1977	(Japan) Hiromi Kawashima	(Japan) Keiki Hayakawa	(United States) R Senior
1980	(Japan) Hiromi Kawashima	(Japan) Hiroko Moriya	(East Germany) Schweiber
1983	(Japan) Hiroko Moriya	(Japan) Yuko Sakada	(Japan) Yoko Nakamura
1985	(Japan) Yoko Nakamura	(Japan) Kikue Yamamoto	(Japan) Yurika Yoshida
1987	(Japan) Yuki Mimura	(Japan) Yoko Nakamura	(Japan) Hiroe Sekimori
1990	(Japan) Yuki Mimura	(Sweden) Lena Svensson-Pyrée	(Japan) Maiko Asano
1992	(Japan) Yoko Nakamura	(Japan) Miyo Gunji	(Japan) Miwa Akiyama
1994	(Japan) Yoko Nakamura	(Indonesia) Ompi Omita	(Japan) Haruna Ikutake
1996	(Japan) Yoko Nakamura	(Japan) Miyo Gunji	(Japan) Nakata Terumi
1998	(Japan) Miyoko Fujiwara	(Japan) Miyo Gunji	(South Africa) Karin Prinsloo
2000	(Japan) Nakata Terumi	(Japan) Miyo Gunji	(Japan) Chiharu Azuma
2004	(Japan) Nakata Terumi	(Japan) Misako Aragaki	(Japan) Oshima Nozomi
2006	(Japan) Misako Aragaki	(Japan) Nozomi Oshima	(Japan) Shirota Takaki
2011	(Japan) Nozomi Oshima	(Japan) Miki Nakamachi	(Japan) Serino Fukasaku
2014	(Japan) Miki Nakamachi	(Japan) Takagi Ayano	(Japan) Hikawa Nao
2017	(Japan) Ayano Nakamura	(Japan) Yuna Sato	(Japan) Rio Hayakawa
2024	(Japan) Saori Ishibashi	(Japan) Tamaki Shimura	(Japan) Airi Sekizawa
