= Masatoshi Nakayama =

Japanese karateka

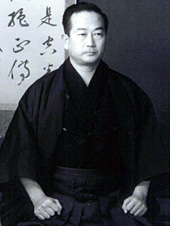
- Born: April 13, 1913; Yamaguchi Prefecture, Empire of Japan
- Died: April 15, 1987 (aged 74); Tokyo, Japan
- Style: Shotokan karate
- Teachers: Gichin Funakoshi, Gigō Funakoshi, Isao Obata, Takeshi Shimoda
- Rank: 10th dan Karate

Other information
- Notable students: Keigo Abe, Tetsuhiko Asai, Keinosuke Enoeda, Hirokazu Kanazawa, Shojiro Koyama, Takayuki Mikami, Cary-Hiroyuki Tagawa Teruyuki Okazaki, Hidetaka Nishiyama, Taiji Kase, Hiroshi Shirai, Masaaki Ueki, Hideo Ochi, Masahiko Tanaka, Yutaka Yaguchi, Shigeru Takashina, Stan Schmidt, Toshihiro Mori, Takenori Imura, Minoru Kawawada, Hideo Yamamoto, Takashi Yamaguchi, Yoshiharu Osaka, Yasunori Ogura, Ilija Jorga, Tomio Imamura, Seizo Izumiya, Katsutoshi Shiina, Yasuo Hanzaki, Vilaça Pinto, Sadamu Uriu
- Website: Karate Association

Masatoshi Nakayama (中山 正敏, Nakayama Masatoshi; April 13, 1913 – April 15, 1987)^{[a]} was an internationally famous Japanese master of Shotokan karate. He helped establish the Japan Karate Association (JKA) in 1949, and wrote many textbooks on karate, which served to popularize his martial art. For almost 40 years, until his death in 1987, Nakayama worked to spread Shotokan karate around the world. He was the first master in Shotokan history to attain the rank of 9th dan while alive, and was posthumously awarded the rank of 10th dan.

== Early life ==
Nakayama was born on April 13, 1913, in the Yamaguchi prefecture of Japan. He was descended from the Sanada clan, who were known as kenjutsu instructors, from the Nagano region. Nakayama's grandfather was Naomichi Nakayama, a surgeon in Tokyo, who had also been the last of the family to teach kenjutsu. Nakayama's father was Naomichi Nakayama, an army physician and a judoka (practitioner of judo). His father was assigned to Taipei, so Nakayama spent some of his formative years there. Apart from his academic studies, he participated in kendo, skiing, swimming, tennis, and track running.

Nakayama entered Takushoku University in 1932 to study Chinese language, and began learning karate under Gichin Funakoshi and his son Yoshitaka (also known as Gigō). He had originally planned to continue his training in kendo, but misread the schedule and arrived at karate training instead—and, interested by what he saw, ended up joining that martial art group. Nakayama graduated from Takushoku University in 1937. That same year, he travelled to China as a military interpreter during the Japanese occupation of China. By the time World War II began, Nakayama had attained the rank of 2nd dan. Nakayama returned to Japan in May 1946, after the war.

== Japan Karate Association ==
In May 1949, Nakayama, Isao Obata, and other colleagues helped establish the Japan Karate Association (JKA). Funakoshi was the formal head of the organization, with Nakayama appointed as Chief Instructor as he was the only one without a job and they needed someone to open and close the dojo during the day. By 1951, Nakayama had been promoted to 3rd dan, and he held the rank of 5th dan by 1955. In 1956, working with Teruyuki Okazaki, he restructured the Shotokan karate training program to follow both traditional karate and methods developed in modern sports sciences. In 1961, Nakayama was promoted to 8th dan, in part made possible by the consensus-based system of higher dan promotion in Japan at the time, according to Pat Zalewski. Nakayama established kata (patterns) and kumite (sparring) as tournament disciplines. Students of the large JKA dojo (training halls) subsequently achieved an unmatched series of tournament successes in the 1950s and 1960s.

Nakayama is widely known for having worked to spread Shotokan karate throughout the world. Together with other senior instructors, he formed the JKA instructor trainee program. Many of this program's graduates were sent throughout the world to form new Shotokan subgroups and increase membership. Nakayama also held positions in the Physical Education department of Takushoku University, beginning in 1952, and eventually becoming head of that department. He also headed the ski team at the university.

== Later life ==
In 1972, Nakayama, with some help from one of his students, Hirokazu Kanazawa, set up a personal dojo in the basement of his apartment building, naming it "Hoitsugan." This dojo is located in Ebisu, Tokyo, a short distance from where the JKA honbu (headquarters) dojo was located. Karate students from outside Japan lived in the dormitory rooms and trained in this dojo from the early 1970s.

After rapid promotion through the ranks in the 1950s, Nakayama still held the rank of 8th dan in 1974. He was promoted to 9th dan in the 1980s, becoming the first Shotokan master to be awarded this rank while still living. Nakayama continued teaching Shotokan karate until his death on April 15, 1987, in Tokyo, Japan.

== Legacy ==
Nakayama wrote many books on karate, including the 11-volume Best Karate series. He also had many video productions credited to him. Nakayama's books include: Practical Karate: A guide to everyman's self-defense (1963, co-authored), Practical Karate: Defense against an unarmed assailant (1963, co-authored), Best Karate: Comprehensive (1977), and Dynamic Karate (1986). Martial arts scholar Donn Draeger was one of Nakayama's well-known co-authors.

After Nakayama's death in 1987, the JKA divided into two factions, which subsequently led to a further splintering within the organization. Many senior JKA instructors left to form their own associations, which include the International Shotokan Karate Federation (Teruyuki Okazaki), Japan Karate Shotokai (Tetsuhiko Asai), Japan Shotokan Karate Association (Keigo Abe), Shotokan Karate International Federation (Hirokazu Kanazawa), Japan Karate Association / World Federation America (Shojiro Koyama) and America and Karatenomichi World Federation (Mikio Yahara).

== Publications ==
- Nakayama, Masatoshi (1966). Dynamic Karate. Kodansha America. ISBN 978-0-87011-037-5.
- Nakayama, Masatoshi (1977). Best Karate, Vol.1: Comprehensive. Kodansha International. ISBN 978-0-87011-317-8.
- Nakayama, Masatoshi (1978). Best Karate, Vol.2: Fundamentals. Kodansha International. ISBN 978-0-87011-324-6.
- Nakayama, Masatoshi (1978). Best Karate, Vol.3: Kumite 1. Kodansha International. ISBN 978-0-87011-332-1.
- Nakayama, Masatoshi (1979). Best Karate, Vol.4: Kumite 2. Kodansha International. ISBN 978-0-87011-359-8.
- Nakayama, Masatoshi (1979). Best Karate, Vol.5: Heian, Tekki. Kodansha International. ISBN 978-0-87011-379-6.
- Nakayama, Masatoshi (1980). Best Karate, Vol.6: Bassai, Kankū. Kodansha International. ISBN 978-0-87011-383-3.
- Nakayama, Masatoshi (1981). Best Karate, Vol.7: Jitte, Hangetsu, Empi. Kodansha International. ISBN 978-0-87011-390-1.
- Nakayama, Masatoshi (1981). Best Karate, Vol.8: Gankaku, Jion. Kodansha International. ISBN 978-0-87011-402-1.
- Nakayama, Masatoshi (1986). Best Karate, Vol.9: Bassai Sho, Kankū Sho, Chinte. Kodansha International. ISBN 978-0-87011-680-3.
- Nakayama, Masatoshi (1990). Best Karate, Vol.10: Unsu, Sōchin, Nijūshiho. Kodansha International. ISBN 978-0-87011-734-3.
- Nakayama, Masatoshi (1990). Best Karate, Vol.11: Gojūshiho Dai, Gojūshiho Shō, Meikyō. Kodansha International. ISBN 978-0-87011-758-9.

== See also ==
- List of Shotokan organizations

== Notes ==
a. All sources agree that Nakayama was born in April 1913 and died in April 1987. Most state that he was born on April 13 and died on April 15, but some give his birth date as April 6 or April 15, and some give his death date as April 14.
