= Hirokazu Kanazawa =

Japanese karateka (1931–2019)

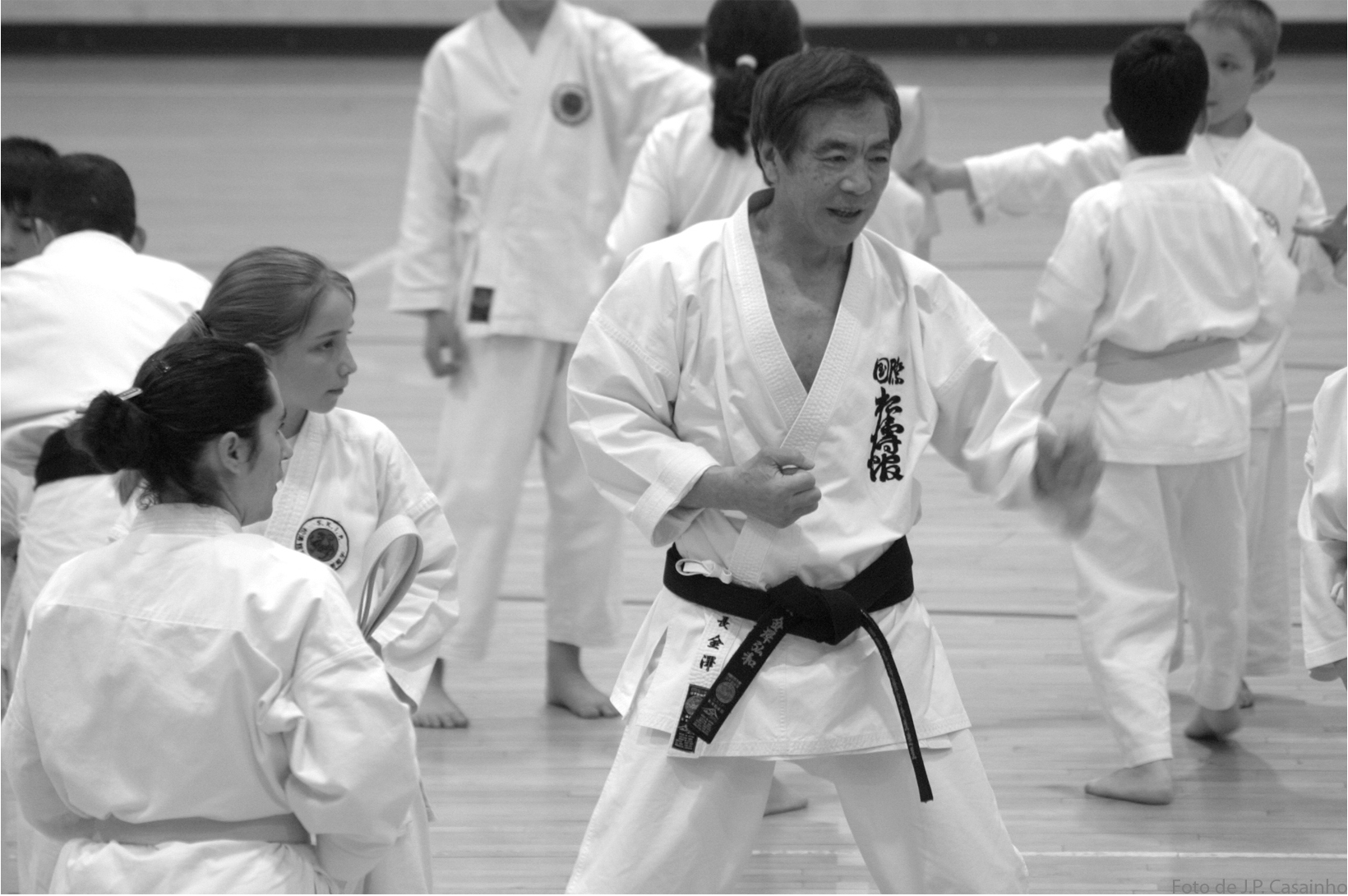
- Born: May 3, 1931; Iwate Prefecture, Japan
- Died: December 8, 2019 (aged 88)
- Style: Shotokan; Karate; Judo; Tai chi
- Teachers: Gichin Funakoshi, Masatoshi Nakayama
- Rank: 10th Dan Shotokan Karate, 2nd Dan Judo

Other information
- Website: Shotokan Karate-Do International Federation

Hirokazu Kanazawa (金澤 弘和, Kanazawa Hirokazu; 3 May 1931 – 8 December 2019) was a Japanese master of Shotokan karate. He was the Chief instructor and President of the Shotokan Karate-Do International Federation, an organisation he founded after he left the Japan Karate Association (JKA). Kanazawa was ranked 10th dan in Shotokan Karate.

== Early life ==
Kanazawa was born on 3 May 1931 in Iwate Prefecture, Japan. He trained in judo during his school years, and held the rank of 2nd dan in that martial art. He began training in karate whilst at Takushoku University under the then-head instructor of Shotokan karate, Masatoshi Nakayama. Kanazawa also learned from the founder of the Shotokan style, Gichin Funakoshi, and was one of the last living karateka (practitioners of karate) to have done so.

Kanazawa was promoted to the rank of 1st dan in Shotokan karate with less than two years of training in the art; promotion to 2nd dan came three years later. In 1956, he graduated from university and joined the JKA. That same year, he was promoted to 3rd dan. Kanazawa won the inaugural All Japan Karate Championship's kumite (sparring) championship in 1957. He reportedly won the kumite competition with a broken hand. That same year, Kanazawa was among the first to graduate from the JKA's instructor training programme. In 1958, Kanazawa won the kata (patterns) title and shared the kumite title with Takayuki Mikami. Mikami and Kanazawa had been classmates and roommates for a long time and, because they knew each other well, they launched a minimal number of attacks, mainly just circling until the time was up; thus, they shared the kumite title.

== Promoting Shotokan across the world ==
In January 1961, the JKA sent Kanazawa to Hawaii to establish karate schools there. He was ranked 5th dan at the time. He established a dojo (training hall) and served as the inaugural President of the Hawaii Karate Congress. In May 1963, he left Hawaii to teach in Europe and Japan. In 1966, Kanazawa became Chief Instructor of the Karate Union of Great Britain, and the JKA promoted him to the rank of 6th dan that year. In 1973, the All Japan Karate Federation promoted him to 7th dan.

In 1977, Kanazawa left the JKA and founded the Shotokan Karate-Do International Federation (SKIF). Since then, he taught and promoted karate through the SKIF, including the organisation of several karate world championship competitions. Despite leaving the JKA, he was reported to maintain some ties with former colleagues in that organisation. In 1990, Kanazawa demonstrated his art at the 10th Traditional Karate Tournament International, held in Las Vegas. In 1994 and 1995, he demonstrated his art at the 14th and 15th Traditional Karate Tournaments International.

Kanazawa wrote several books on karate, which include: Kankudai (1969), Moving Zen: One man's journey to the heart of Karate (2001, co-authored), Karate: My life (2003), Karate fighting techniques: The complete kumite (2004, co-authored), and Black Belt Karate: The Intensive Course (2006), and Karate: The Complete Kata (2013). He was featured in Paul Walker's book, Lessons with the Master: 279 Karate lessons with Master Hirokazu Kanazawa.

The International Martial Arts Federation promoted Kanazawa to 8th dan in 1978, 9th dan in 1988, and 10th dan in 2000.

== See also ==
- List of Shotokan organizations
