= Hazard (surname) =

- Region where the name Hazard first appeared is highlighted in red

Origin
- Region of origin: England

Hazard is an English surname. The name originates in early medieval England. The surname first appears on record in the latter part of the 12th Century (below), and further early examples include: Geoffrey Hasard, noted in the 1185 Knights Templars' Records of Lincolnshire, and Walter Hassard (Kent, 1197). In later decades it would be spelled as either "Hazard" or "Hazzard.".

- Augustus George Hazard, American gunpowder manufacturer and namesake of Hazardville, Connecticut
- Benjamin Hazard (1770–1841), Rhode Island politician & attorney
- Carder Hazard (1734–1792), Justice of the Rhode Island Supreme Court
- Caroline Hazard (1856–1945), president of Wellesley College
- Conor Hazard, Irish goalkeeper
- Dave Hazard, British karate expert
- Dorothy Hazard, English religious reformer
- Ebenezer Hazard, American publisher and US Postmaster General
- Eden Hazard, Belgian footballer, brother of Thorgan and Kylian
- Erskine Hazard, industrialist
- Geoffrey C. Hazard Jr., American law professor
- George Hazard, Deputy colonial governor, Rhode Island
- Henry T. Hazard, mayor of Los Angeles
- Jeffrey Hazard (1762–1840), Justice of the Rhode Island Supreme Court
- Jonathan Hazard, American statesman
- Joseph Hazard (1728–1790), Justice of the Rhode Island Supreme Court
- Kylian Hazard, Belgian footballer, brother of Eden and Thorgan
- Manny Hazard, American football player
- Micky Hazard, English footballer
- Nathaniel Hazard (1776–1820), U.S. Congressman
- Oliver Hazard Perry (1785–1819), American naval officer
- Paul Hazard, French historian of ideas
- Richard Hazard (1921–2000), American television composer
- Robert Hazard (1948–2008), American musician
- Robert Hazard (Rhode Island politician) (1702–1751), deputy governor of colonial Rhode Island
- Roberta L. Hazard, admiral in U.S. Navy
- Rowland Hazard (disambiguation), one of several people by this name
- Thierry Hazard (born 1962), French singer
- Thomas Hazard (c. 1610 – c. 1677, founding settler of Newport, Rhode Island
- Thorgan Hazard (born 1993), Belgian footballer, brother of Eden and Kylian

== See also ==
- Hazzard (disambiguation), contains list of people with surname Hazzard
