= Rowland Hazard =

Rowland Hazard may refer to:

- Rowland Hazard (1763-1835), Rhode Island industrialist, established a woollen mill in Peace Dale, Rhode Island c.1804
- Rowland G. Hazard (1801–1888), son of above, industrialist associated with textile mill complexes in Peace Dale and Carolina, Rhode Island
- Rowland Hazard II (1829-1898), son of above, operated textile mills in Peace Dale and Carolina, Rhode Island; initial investor in Solvay Process Co.
- Rowland G. Hazard II (1855–1918), son of above, vice president of the Solvay Process Company
- Rowland Hazard III (1881–1945), son of above, American businessman and politician, connected with the founding of Alcoholics Anonymous

== See also ==
- Hazard family
- Hazard (disambiguation)
