= Hazard (disambiguation) =

A hazard is an agent which has the potential to cause harm to a vulnerable target.

Hazard may also refer to:

== Comics and anime ==
- El-Hazard, a Japanese anime series and franchise including a manga adaptation
- Hazard (DC Comics), a character in the Injustice Society
- Hazard (Marvel Comics), an enemy of the X-Men
- Hazard (Wildstorm), a Wildstorm series
- Jenos Hazard, a character in Black Cat manga

== Film and television ==
- Hazard (1921 film), a German silent film
- Hazard (1948 film), an American film directed by George Marshall
- Hazard (2005 film), a Japanese-American film directed by Sion Sono
- "Hazard" (Chancer), a 1990 television episode
- Hazard, a middleweight battlebot from the TV series BattleBots

== Gaming ==
- Hazard (game), a game of chance
- Hazard (golf)
- Hazard (Judges Guild), a 1980 supplement to the role-playing game Superhero: 2044
- Hazard (Overwatch), a playable character in Overwatch
- Hazard, a term in cue sports

== Music ==
- Hazard (musician), stage name of B. J. Nilsen, Swedish sound artist
- Hazard (song), a 1991 song by Richard Marx

== People ==
- Hazard (surname), a list of people with the surname
  - Eden Hazard (born 1991), Belgian former professional footballer
- Hazard Stevens (1842–1918), American soldier awarded the Medal of Honor, politician, mountaineer who made the first documented climb of Mount Rainier, and writer

== Places ==
In the United States

- Hazard, Kentucky, a city
- Hazard, Nebraska, a village
- Hazard, Washington, an unincorporated community

Elsewhere

- The Hazards, a mountain range in Tasmania

== Ships ==
- Hazard (ship), a sloop wrecked off Broken Bay, Australia in 1809
- HMS Hazard, several Royal Navy ships
- USS Hazard (AM-240), a US Navy minesweeper

== Other uses ==
- Hazard (computer architecture)
- Hazard (logic)
- Hazards (magazine), an occupational safety and health magazine
- Hazards, a type of automotive lighting
- Hazard Farmstead (Joyner Site RI-706), an archeological site in Jamestown, Rhode Island
- Hazard function, used in Survival analysis

== See also ==
- Hazzard (disambiguation)
