= Senator Hazard =

Senator Hazard may refer to:

- Rowland G. Hazard (1801–1888), Rhode Island State Senate
- Rowland Hazard III (1881–1945), Rhode Island State Senate

== See also ==
- David Hazzard (1781–1864), Delaware State Senate
