= Eli Whitney Blake =

American inventor (1795–1886)

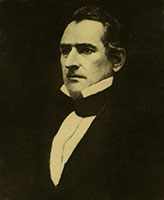
- Born: Eli Whitney Blake; January 27, 1795; Westborough, Massachusetts, U.S.
- Died: August 18, 1886 (aged 91); New Haven, Connecticut, U.S.
- Education: Leicester Academy; Yale University
- Occupation: Inventor
- Spouse: Eliza Maria O'Brien (m. 1822; died 1876)
- Children: 12
- Parent(s): Elihu Blake; Elizabeth Fay Whitney Blake
- Relatives: Eli Whitney (uncle); William Phipps Blake (nephew)

Eli Whitney Blake, Sr. (January 27, 1795 – August 18, 1886) was an American inventor, best known for his mortise lock and stone-crushing machine, the latter of which earned him a place into the National Inventors Hall of Fame.

== Early life ==
Blake was born on January 27, 1795, in Westborough in Worcester County, Massachusetts. He was the son of Elihu Blake and Elizabeth Fay (née Whitney) Blake. His older brother, also named Elihu Blake, was the father of William Phipps Blake. His sister, Maria Georgianna Blake, was married to Archibald Burgess.

He was a nephew of Eli Whitney, the inventor of the cotton gin. His maternal grandparents were Eli Whitney Sr., a prosperous farmer, and his wife Elizabeth (née Fay) Whitney. His paternal grandparents were Tamar (née Thompson) Blake and Ebenezer Blake Jr., a descendant of William Blake, who emigrated from England to Dorchester between 1630 and 1635, and later helped William Pynchon settle Springfield, Massachusetts.

Blake studied at Leicester Academy, and was graduated at Yale in 1816, after which he studied law with Judge Gould at Litchfield Law School in Litchfield, Connecticut.

== Career ==
Blake soon abandoned the study of law at the request of his uncle, Eli Whitney, who desired his assistance in erecting and organizing the gun factory at Whitneyville. Here he made important improvements in the machinery and in the processes of manufacturing arms.

On the death of his uncle in 1825, Blake associated with himself his brother Philos, and continued to manage the business. On December 31, 1833, he, with brothers Philo and John, patented an "Escutcheon Latch", the first mortise lock produced in the United States. In 1836, under the firm name of Blake Brothers, they established at Westville a factory for the production of door locks and latches of their own invention. The business was afterward extended so as to include casters, hinges, and other articles of hardware, most of which were covered by patents. In this branch of manufacture, Blake Brothers were among the pioneers, and long held the front rank.

In 1852, Blake was appointed to superintend the macadamizing of the city streets, and his attention was directed to the want of a proper machine for breaking stone. This problem he solved in 1857, by the invention of the Blake stone breaker, which, for originality, simplicity, and effectiveness, was justly regarded by experts as unique.

Blake was one of the founders, and for several years president, of the Connecticut Academy of Science. He contributed valuable papers to the American Journal of Science and other periodicals, the most important of which he published in a single volume as Original Solutions of Several Problems in Aërodynamics (1882).

== Personal life ==
On July 8, 1822, Blake was married to Eliza Maria O'Brien (1799–1876), a daughter of Edward J. O'Brien and Mary (née Pierrepont) O'Brien, a great-granddaughter of the Rev. James Pierpont, one of the founders of Yale College. After the death of Eliza's father, her mother remarried to prominent lawyer Eleazer Foster and had several more children, including Eleazer Kingsbury Foster. Together, Eli and Eliza were the parents of many children, including five boys who graduated from Yale:

- Mary Elizabeth Blake (1823–1916), who married Rev. George Bushnell (1818–1898).
- Henrietta Whitney Blake (1825–1901), who married Alexander MacWhorter III.
- Charles Thompson Blake (1826–1897), who went to California during the gold rush and worked in gold assaying for Wells, Fargo & Co. He married Harriet Waters Stiles.
- Henry Taylor Blake (1828–1922), who married Elizabeth Coit Kingsley (1830–1914), daughter of James Luce Kingsley.
- Robert Pierrepont Blake (1830–1836), who died in childhood.
- George Augustus Blake (1832–1882), who died unmarried.
- Eliza Maria Blake (1833–1836), who died in childhood.
- Frances Louisa Blake (1835–1893), who married Arthur Dimon Osborn, son of U.S. Representative Thomas Burr Osborne. Arthur's sister Elizabeth married Gov. Henry Baldwin Harrison.
- Eli Whitney Blake, Jr. (1836–1895), who married Helen Mary Rood (1832–1869).
- Edward Foster Blake (1837–1862), who was killed in battle at Cedar Mountain, Virginia during the U.S. Civil War.
- James Pierrepont Blake (1839–1865), who drowned near Beaufort, South Carolina while trying to assist freedmen.
- Eliza Maria Blake (1841–1917).

His wife died on April 15, 1876, and Blake died on August 18, 1886, in New Haven, Connecticut.

=== Descendants ===
Through his daughter Mary, he was the grandfather of four, including homemaker Dotha Bushnell (1861–1921) and Mary Pierpont Bushnell (1859–1936), who married Rowland Gibson Hazard (1855–1918) (a grandson of Rowland G. Hazard), the parents of Rowland Hazard III, a founder of Alcoholics Anonymous.

Through his daughter Frances, he was the grandfather of chemist Thomas Burr Osborn and Arthur Sherwood Osborn.
