= Joseph P. Hazard =

American businessman (1807-1892)

Joseph Peace Hazard
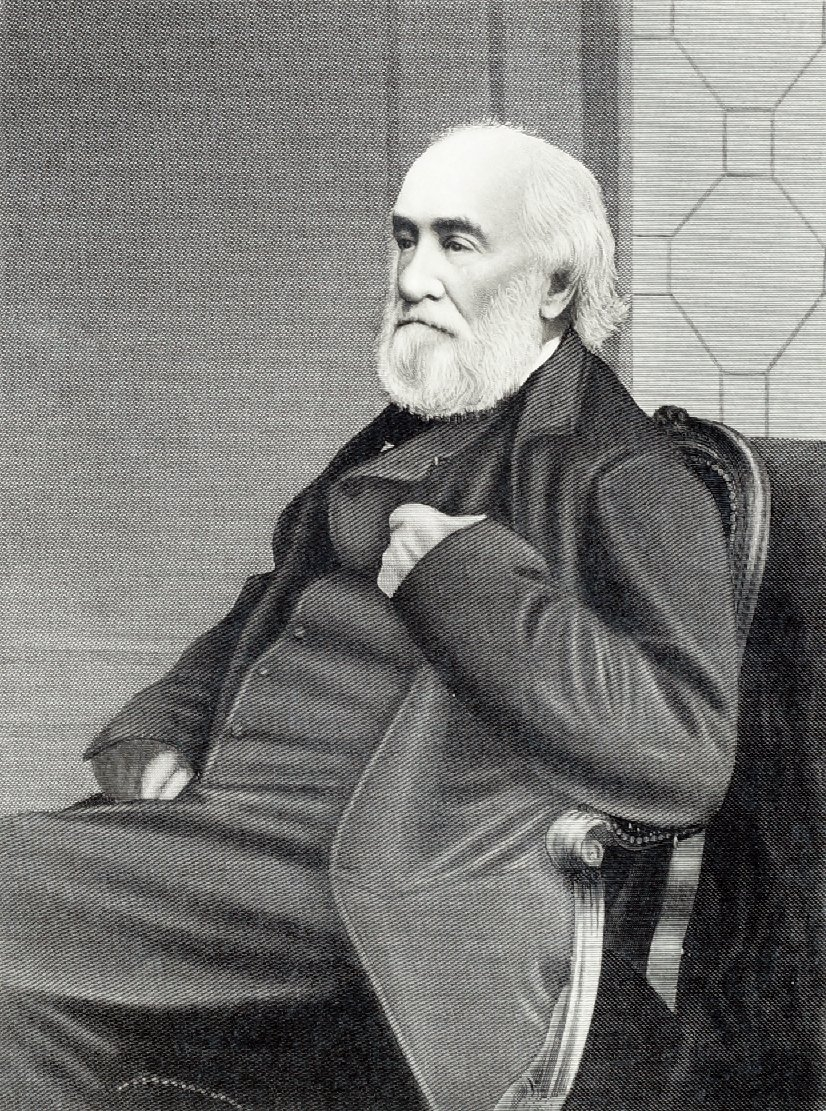
- Engraving of Joseph Peace Hazard
- Born: February 17, 1807; Burlington, New Jersey, U.S.
- Died: January 18, 1892 (aged 84); Peace Dale, Rhode Island, U.S.
- Education: Westtown School
- Occupation: Businessman

Joseph Peace Hazard (February 17, 1807 – January 18, 1892) was an American businessman, textile manufacturer and spiritualist who built three structures in Narragansett with one of them now known as "Hazard Castle" on his seaside farm in Narragansett Pier.

== Early life ==
Hazard was born on February 17, 1807 in Burlington, New Jersey, as the fifth of eight children born to Rowland Hazard I (1763-1835) and Mary Peace Hazard (1775-1852). He later got his education at the Quaker Westtown School in Pennsylvania and finished his education in 1824.

== Career ==
Joseph took partnership in his family's textile mill named "R.G. Hazard & Co" after settling in Peace Dale, Rhode Island. The textile mill was owned by Rowland G. Hazard and Isaac P. Hazard who were Joseph's brothers. The R.G. Hazard & Co. in 1828 then later was renamed and became the Peace Dale Manufacturing Company. Joseph created an inclusion to the mill and managed it for many years, he as well created an axe factory west of the Peace Dale Manufacturing Company. Hazard wrote in his diary "I was incompetent to business. My brothers Isaac and Rowland aided me generously but this was unavailing."

== Later years ==
Joseph Hazard mainly traveled in certain countries like England and France in his later years. He was captivated in spiritualism and wrote notes of when he felt close to spirits, similar to his brother Thomas R. Hazard and numerous other people in the 19th century. From 1840 to 1890, Hazard created three buildings: his "Castle" that is now part of Middlesbridge School, on his seaside farm on Hazard Avenue; his stone house he nicknamed the "Druidsdream" on Gibson Avenue in Narragansett; and across the street past that house is now appointed as a historical cemetery that he called "Kendal Green". The Castle was sold by the Hazard family to the Roman Catholic church in 1951 for use as a retreat centre, and who in turn sold it to Middlesbridge School in 2012.

== Death ==
Joseph Hazard died on January 18, 1892, at Peace Dale.
