= Brinton Piez =

American sports coach (1923–1995)

Biographical details
- Born: August 9, 1923
- Died: November 24, 1995 (aged 72); Peace Dale, Rhode Island, U.S.

Playing career

Football
- 1946–1949: Temple

Coaching career (HC unless noted)

Football
- 1952–1954: Upper Iowa (assistant)
- 1955–1956: Dickinson

Basketball
- 1952–1955: Upper Iowa

Baseball
- 1969: Rhode Island

Lacrosse
- 1956–1957: Dickinson

Head coaching record
- Overall: 4–13 (football); 4–13 (baseball); 6–9–1 (lacrosse)

Brinton Carl "Brit" Piez (August 9, 1923 – November 24, 1995) was an American college football, college basketball, college baseball, college lacrosse, and golf coach. He was the 28th head football coach at Dickinson College in Carlisle, Pennsylvania, serving for two seasons, from 1955 to 1956, and compiling a record of 4–13.
