= Justice Hazard =

Justice Hazard may refer to:

- Carder Hazard (1734–1792), associate justice of the Rhode Island Supreme Court
- Jeffrey Hazard (1762–1840), associate justice of the Rhode Island Supreme Court
- Joseph Hazard (1728–1790), associate justice of the Rhode Island Supreme Court
