= Eli Whitney Blake Jr. =

American scientist (1836–1895)

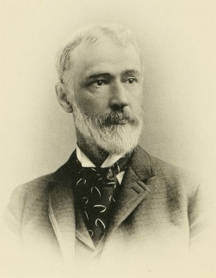
- Born: April 20, 1836; New Haven, Connecticut, U.S.
- Died: October 1, 1895 (aged 59); Hampton, Connecticut, U.S.
- Occupation: Scientist
- Spouse: Helen Mary Rood (m. 1860; died 1869)
- Children: 2
- Parents: Eli Whitney Blake; Eliza Maria O'Brien Blake

Eli Whitney Blake Jr. (April 20, 1836 – October 1, 1895) was an American scientist. His father and namesake was an inventor and partner of the Blake Brothers manufacturing firm. His great uncle was Eli Whitney, who changed the face of the cotton industry with the invention of the cotton gin.

== Early life ==
Blake was born on April 20, 1836, in New Haven, Connecticut. He was one of twelve children born to Eli Whitney Blake and Eliza Maria (née O'Brien) Blake. Through his mother, he was a descendant of the Rev. James Pierpont, one of the co-founders of Yale.

Blake graduated from Yale in 1857, after which he spent a year at Sheffield Scientific School. He was a member of Skull and Bones, class of 1857. Following his time at Sheffield, he traveled to Europe, where he studied chemistry and physics in the universities of Heidelberg, Marburg, and Berlin.

== Career ==
On his return to America, he was made professor of chemistry and physics at the University of Vermont (1867). After less than a year, he went to Cornell University, where he was professor of physics and mechanic arts (1868–1870). During this time he also acted temporarily as professor of physics at Columbia College from 1868 to 1869. From 1870 to 1895, he filled the chair of physics at Brown University.

Although not a well-known figure in the scientific community, Blake was a member of the American Association for the Advancement of Science and other similar associations. He also contributed to various scientific periodicals, such as the American Journal of Science and Arts.

== Publications ==
- Blake, E. W. (1870). "On a method of producing, by the electric spark, figures similar to those of Lichtenberg". American Journal of Science. 49 (147): 289–294. Bibcode:1870AmJS...49..289B. doi:10.2475/ajs.s2-49.147.289. S2CID 131613811.
- Blake, E. W. (1878). "A method of recording articulate vibrations by means of photography". American Journal of Science. 16 (91): 54–59. Bibcode:1878AmJS...16...54B. doi:10.2475/ajs.s3-16.91.54. S2CID 6596022.

== Personal life ==
On March 8, 1860, Blake was married to Helen Mary Rood (1832–1869), the daughter of Rev. Anson Rood and Alida Gouverneur (née Ogden) Rood (daughter of Rev. Uzal Ogden). Among her family was uncle Nicholas Gouverneur Ogden, a partner of John Jacob Astor. Together, Eli and Helen were the parents of:

- Alida Gouverneur Blake (1861–1938), who married Barclay Hazard, the son of Thomas Robinson Hazard and nephew of Rowland G. Hazard.
- Eli Whitney Blake III (1867–1902), who died aged 35.

Blake died on October 1, 1895, in Hampton, Connecticut.
