= HMS Hazard =

Seven ships of the Royal Navy have borne the name HMS Hazard:

- HMS Hazard (1711) was a 14-gun sloop launched in 1711. She was wrecked in 1714 off Boston, New England.
- HMS Hazard (1744) was a 14-gun sloop launched in 1744. She was in the hands of the Young Pretender in 1745–46. She was sold in 1749.
- HMS Hazard (1749) was an 8-gun sloop launched in 1749 that the Navy sold in 1783. She became the mercantile Joseph and then between 1793 and 1802 she made seven voyages as a whaler. A French privateer captured her in 1800, but HMS Fisgard quickly recaptured her.
- HMS Hazard (1794) was a 16-gun sloop launched in 1794. She was sold in 1817.
- HMS Hazard (1837) was an 18-gun sloop launched in 1837. She was sold in 1866.
- HMS Hazard (1894) was an Dryad-class torpedo gunboat launched in 1894. She was converted to a submarine tender in 1901 and was sunk in 1918 in a collision in the English Channel.
- HMS Hazard (J02) was a Halcyon-class minesweeper launched in 1937. She was sold in 1949.

also

- HMS Hazard's Prize (1756) was the 8-gun privateer sloop Subtile that HMS Hazard captured from the French in 1756. She was sold in 1759.
