= John Dalrymple (Royal Navy officer) =

Royal Navy Admiral (1722–1798)

Admiral John Dalrymple FRS
- Born: 1722
- Died: October 10, 1798 (aged 75–76); Manchester Square, London
- Spouse: Eleanor Howard
- Children: 2
- Military career
- Allegiance: Kingdom of Great Britain
- Branch: Royal Navy
- Service years: 1740–1798
- Rank: Admiral
- Commands: HMS Hazard's Prize; HMS Albany; HMS Solebay; HMS Winchester; HMS Union; Nore Command
- Conflicts: War of the Austrian Succession; Seven Years' War; American Revolutionary War; Battle of Ushant; Battle of Cape Spartel

Admiral John Dalrymple, FRS (1722 – 10 October 1798) was an officer of the Royal Navy who held several commands over the course of his career, and later became a fellow of the Royal Society.

== Naval career ==
Born in Scotland Dalrymple entered the Royal Navy as a captain's servant aboard HMS Alderney. He passed his examinations for promotion to lieutenant in 1744. He commanded a sloop in 1757; and he was promoted to post-captain in 1758. He was captain of HMS Winchester in 1762. He was promoted to the rank of rear-admiral in 1787 and to vice-admiral in 1793. He was Commander-in-Chief, The Nore from 11 May 1794, flying his flag aboard HMS Sandwich. He was promoted to full admiral in 1795.

On 23 May 1796 Dalrymple was elected as a member of the Royal Society.

Military offices
Preceded by William Locker	Commander-in-Chief, The Nore; 1793–1795	Succeeded by Sir George Collier
