= Thomas Robinson Hazard =

American author, social reformer and advocate of Modern Spiritualism

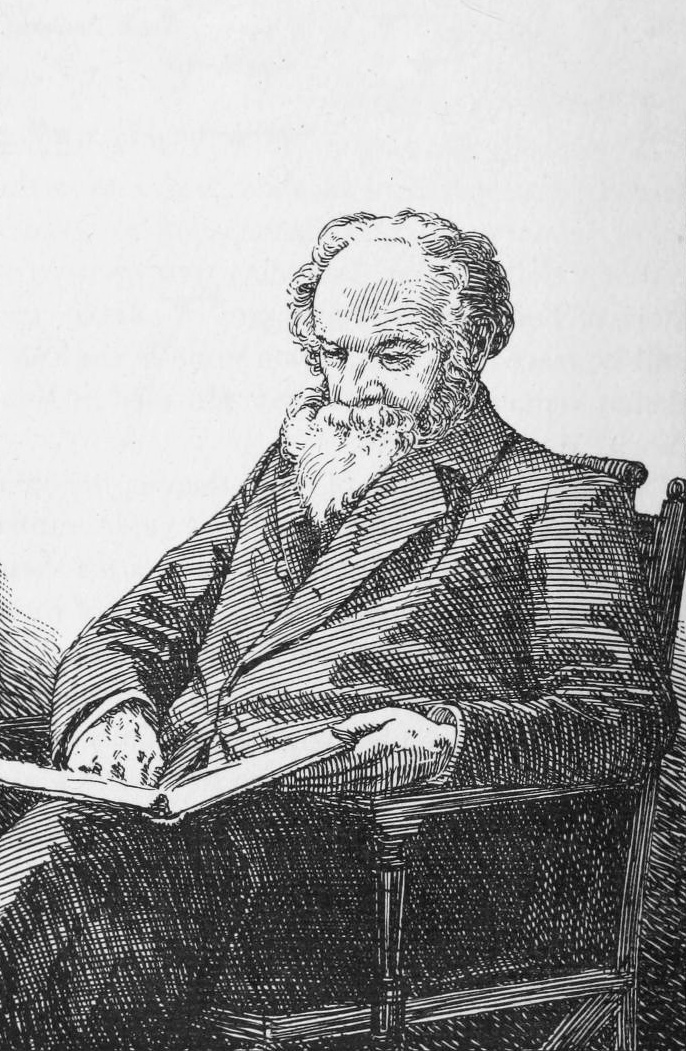
- Born: January 3, 1791; South Kingstown, Rhode Island, U.S.
- Died: March 26, 1886 (aged 95); New York City, U.S.
- Spouse: Frances Minturn (m. 1838; died 1854)
- Children: 6
- Relatives: Rowland G. Hazard (brother)

Thomas Robinson "Shepherd Tom" Hazard (January 3, 1797 – March 26, 1886) was an American author, social reformer, and advocate of Modern Spiritualism.

== Early life ==
Hazard was born on January 3, 1797, in the village of South Kingstown, Rhode Island, the second-eldest son of textile industrialist Rowland Hazard and Mary (née Peace) Hazard. His mother was raised in Charleston, South Carolina and spent a year studying in London as a girl. His father founded the Peace Dale Manufacturing Company in Peace Dale, Rhode Island in 1802. Among his siblings was older brother Isaac Peace Hazard and younger brother Rowland G. Hazard.

A descendant of an old New England Quaker family, Hazard was a fifth-great-grandson of Thomas Hazard, one of the nine founding settlers of Newport on Aquidneck Island in the Colony of Rhode Island and Providence Plantations. His paternal grandparents were Thomas Hazard and Elizabeth (née Robinson) Hazard, herself a daughter of William Robinson, the Deputy Governor of the Colony of Rhode Island and Providence Plantations.

At twelve, Thomas enrolled in the Friends’ School at West Town, Pennsylvania but left to assist in the operation of the family's wool carding manufactures at Peace Dale. After a gift of two ewes sparked his interest in agriculture and livestock, Hazard acquired the nickname “Shepherd Tom.”

== Career ==
In 1844, Hazard became one of the original twenty three incorporators of the Rhode Island Hospital for the Insane, later Butler Hospital. The facility was the first of its kind in the state; responsibility for the care of destitute and mentally handicapped citizens at the time fell largely upon local governments.

Owing to his extensive record as an outspoken champion of the rights of the “insane poor,” Hazard was appointed by the state to conduct a survey of Rhode Island's poor houses and insane asylums. The Report on the Poor and Insane in Rhode Island: Made to the General Assembly at its January Session, 1851 provided a detailed census of “insane paupers” at thirty-three local facilities. The abuse of disabled Rhode Islanders in rural localities exposed in the report helped abolish state policies which treated mental illness as a crime.

Hazard was also a committed antislavery activist and published dozens of tracts in support of the American Colonization Society and the Republic of Liberia. From 1840 to 1841 he served as a Vice President of the ACS. Other causes for which he labored included the abolition of the death penalty in Rhode Island and public education.

=== Spiritualism ===
Following the death of his wife in 1854, Hazard became interested in spiritual communication and began visiting mediums in Providence and Boston. The author Maud Howe Elliott, a neighbor and childhood friend of the Hazard children, recalls Shepherd Tom's grief and subsequent obsession with “materialization, spirit life, mediums, psychic photographs.” Hazard penned numerous firsthand accounts of spirit materializations and séances held in a dedicated room at his Portsmouth estate, Vaucluse. After two of his daughters died of tuberculosis and a third drowned herself in a river on the family's property, he dedicated himself exclusively to the defense of mediumship.

Hazard authored two books of local folklore, the latter of which became the subject of controversy when Dr. Leroy Vaughn used the work as evidence of Thomas Jefferson's African Heritage, which the Thomas Jefferson Foundation has since dismissed.

== Personal life ==
On October 12, 1838, he married Frances Minturn (1813–1854), daughter of New York merchant Jonas Minturn and Esther (née Robinson) Minturn. She was also a niece of Robert Bowne Minturn (who later went into business with Henry Grinnell as Grinnell, Minturn & Co). Together, the couple had five daughter and one son:

- Mary Robinson Hazard (1840–1842), who died in childhood.
- Frances Minturn Hazard (1842–1877), who died unmarried.
- Gertrude Minturn Hazard (1843–1877), who died unmarried.
- Anna Peace Hazard (1846–1868), who died unmarried.
- Esther Robinson Hazard (1848–1880), who married Edwin James Dunning (1821–1901), the son of Uriah Dunning.
- Barclay Hazard (1852–1938), who married Alida Blake, a daughter of Professor Eli Whitney Blake Jr.

Hazard died in New York City on March 26, 1886.

== Published works ==
- Eleven Days at Moravia (1873)
- Blasphemy; Who Are the Blasphemers? The "orthodox" Christians, or "spiritualists"? (1872)
- Modern Spiritualism Scientifically Explained . (1875)
- Recollections of Olden Times: Rowland Robinson of Narragansett and his Unfortunate Daughter: With Genealogies of the Robinson, Hazard, and Sweet families of Rhode Island (1879)
- The Jonnycake Papers of “Shepherd Tom”,: Together with Reminiscences of Narragansett Schools of Former Days (1880)
