= Peter Phillips (judge) =

American judge (1731–1807)

Peter Phillips (August 11, 1731 – December 12, 1807) was a justice of the Rhode Island Supreme Court from May 1780 to May 1786.

Born in North Kingstown, Rhode Island, Phillips was the son of Christopher and grandson of Samuel Phillips. He was baptized on August 28, 1731, "being dangerously sick", but survived. In the American Revolution he "was an inflexible Whig, and rendered important service to his country during the war". He represented North Kingstown in the Rhode Island General Assembly, and subsequently, in 1775 was promoted to the Rhode Island Senate. In May of that year, he was elected commissary of the Army of Observation, a body of fifteen hundred men raised by the state, of which Nathanael Greene was elected brigadier-general. Phillips was reelected state senator for 1776, 1777, 1778 and 1779.

In 1780 the legislature appointed Phillips one of the judges of the supreme court of the state, a position which he held until 1785, when he was one of four delegates elected by the people to represent Rhode Island in the Congress of the Confederation, though did not take his seat in that body. In 1786, he declined re-appointment on the bench of the supreme court, and in 1795, the legislature, "desirous of retaining Phillips in public service", elected him as chief justice of the court of common pleas. However, he soon resigned all public honors and retired to private life.

Phillips was a man of considerable property, owning "a handsome estate in Wickford". He "died Dec. 12, 1807 at about ¼ past 11 o'clock in the morning", at the age of 76.

Political offices
| Preceded by Stephen Potter | Justice of the Rhode Island Supreme Court; 1780–1786 | Succeeded by Joseph Hazard |
