= Shotokan of England Karate Union =

Karate federation

The Shotokan of England Karate Union (SEKU), founded in 1982 is a federation of Shotokan karate clubs in southern England, with about thirty clubs from Helston in Cornwall to Bromley in Greater London. The federation is led by Mick Dewey, 8th dan, who was a student of the late Keinosuke Enoeda.

== History ==
The Shotokan of England Karate Union was founded by Sensei Mick Dewey in 1982 when through circumstance he felt unable to continue his relationship with the KUGB. Originally named the South of England Karate Union, a change to Shotokan of England Karate Union was necessary when some northern English clubs joined. In 1984, due to the Unions growth, Mick Dewey invited his friend Dave Hazard (Hazard was a regular visiting instructor at Brighton Shotokan) to join as technical director of the SEKU. The HQ (Hombu) dojo for SEKU is Portsmouth Karate Club where Mick teaches to this day having begun teaching there in 1972. Mick and Phil Elliott founded many clubs around the south of England and in fact in his own words every karate club in the south of England currently owes its roots to the Portsmouth dojo and SEKU. Brighton Shotokan was founded in June 1974 by Mick Dewey and Phil Elliott at the Sussex Sports Centre, Queens Square, Brighton. Phil Elliott stopped training around 1978/9 and Mick Dewey continued running the club then around 1980 he handed the responsibilities to club members Greg Wedekind, Will Davies, John Cave and Paul Bonnet, they continued running the club until the arrival of Dave Hazard. At the invitation by Mick Dewey and the agreement of the four instructors, Dave Hazard was offered the full-time teaching position at the Brighton club. Dave Hazard moved to Brighton in 1985 and built the club into an elite training ground for adults, mainly black and brown belts. Dave Hazard worked within SEKU until 2003 when he left to found the Academy of Shotokan Karate.

== Organisation ==
SEKU's Chief Instructor is Mick Dewey, who holds the rank of 8th dan. Brian Smith 7th dan who teaches at Lovedean Karate Club is SEKU's senior Technical Committee Member.

== Competitions ==
SEKU organises two competitions each year, held at the Mountbatten Sports Centre. An open tournament for invited clubs is held in November and a SEKU competition in May. In 2009, Dave Galloway and his sister Karyn Powell, both of whom started at Portsmouth dojo won the men's and women's sections respectively of the SEKU nationals.

At the 2009 Shobu-Ippon International Shotokan Open at Guildford the SEKU men's kumite team beat Hasha to win gold medals. Dave Galloway won the men's individual kumite and Hannah Day, performing Gojushio Dai, the ladies' black belt kata. At the 2010 Shobu-ippon event, SEKU came joint third in the medals table.

Dave Galloway from Portsmouth Karate Club was winner of the open weight men's kumite at the SKDUN World Championships at Lons-le-Saunier, France, defeating Alexandre Clementis from Belarus in the final.
