= Hazard family =

American family; early settlers of Rhode Island

Members of the Hazard family were among the first settlers of the State of Rhode Island. Thomas Hazard (c.1610–c.1677) was one of the nine founding settlers of Newport on Aquidneck Island in Rhode Island. Descendants have been known for military achievement, business and political success, philanthropy, and broad social activism spanning such causes as abolition of slavery, treatment of the insane and alcoholics, family planning, and innovative employee programs.

The family fortune was initially generated through large-scale farming across multiple land holdings in Narragansett Country, Rhode Island. This work was primarily done with the unpaid labor of dozens of enslaved black people. Eventually, the business interests evolved and the family wealth largely came from its textile manufacturing business at Peace Dale, Rhode Island, mining, railroad, and chemical interests, including the Solvay Process Company and the Hazard Powder Company.

== History ==
Hazards have been known through generations for many contributions:

- Thomas Hazard Sr. "College Tom" (1720–1798)
- Rowland Hazard (1763–1835)
- Benjamin Hazard (1770–1841) was a Rhode Island legislator, attorney and member of the secessionist Hartford Convention.
- Grace Hazard (1875-1957), vaudeville actress
- Grace Hazard Conkling (1878-1958), poet, author, college professor
- Jonathan J. Hazard (1744 – c. 1824) was an American statesman and Anti-Federalist and delegate from Rhode Island in the Continental Congress.
- Nathaniel Hazard (1776 – December 17, 1820) was a U.S. Representative and Speaker of the House from Rhode Island.
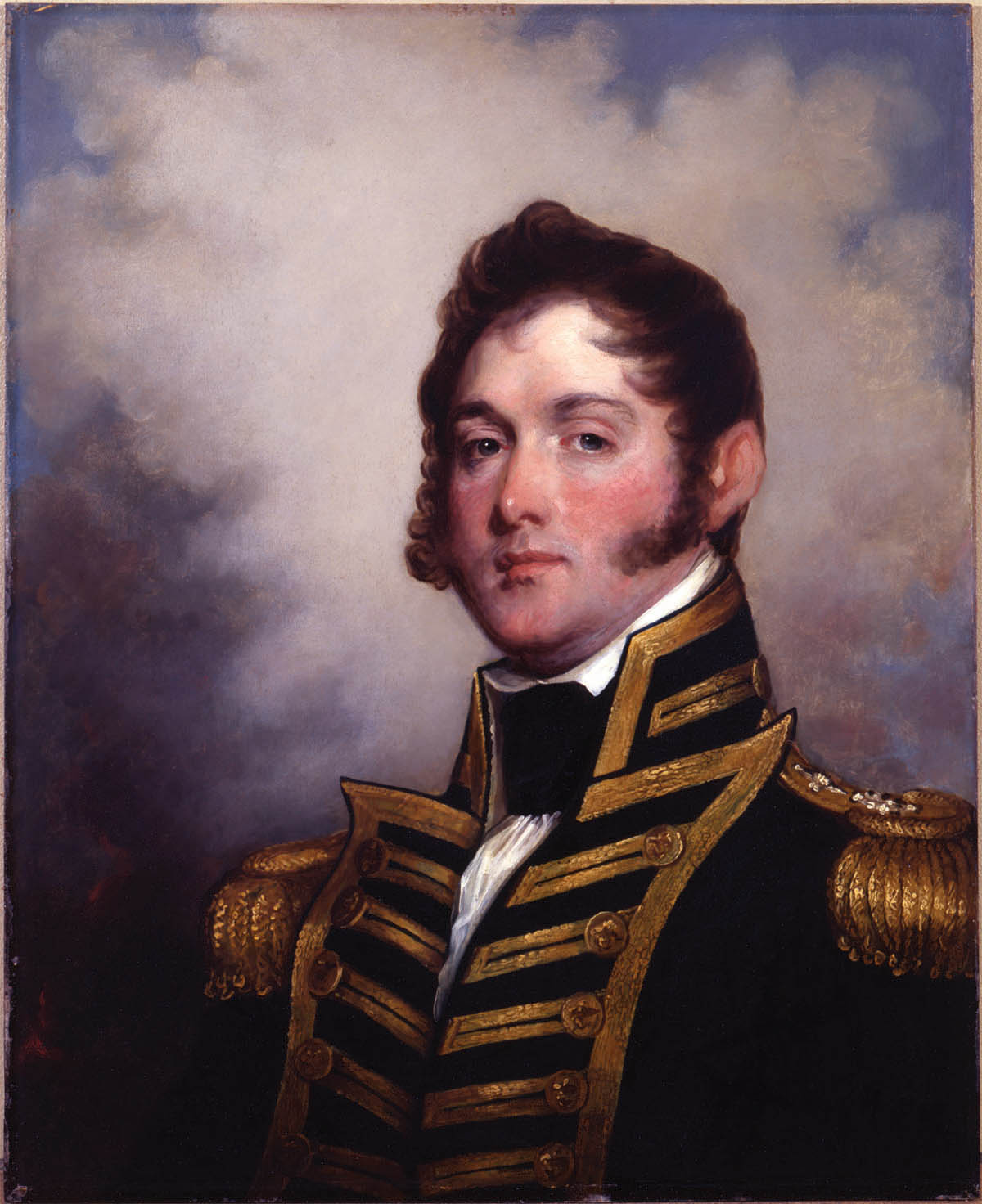
  Portrait of Oliver Hazard Perry, 1818
- Oliver Hazard Perry (August 23, 1785, South Kingstown, Rhode Island – August 23, 1819), Commodore in the United States Navy and "Hero of Lake Erie", famous for his battle cry Don't Give Up the Ship!, was the grandson of Mercy Hazard.
- Matthew Calbraith Perry (April 10, 1794 – March 4, 1858), Commodore in the United States Navy and brother of Oliver Hazard, compelled the opening of Japan to the West in 1854.
- Rowland Gibson Hazard (1801–1888), was an American industrialist, politician, social reformer, and philosophical writer who corresponded with John Stuart Mill and was a friend of William Ellery Channing, founder of Unitarianism.
- Augustus George Hazard (April 22, 1802 – May 7, 1868), was an American gunpowder manufacturer, owner of the Hazard Powder Company, and Hazardville, Connecticut's namesake.
- Joseph Peace Hazard (1807–1892), was an American businessman, early-modern druid, and spiritualist who paid for the construction of several buildings and monuments in Narragansett.
- Rowland G. Hazard II (1829–1898), was the grandson of Rowland G. Hazard and financial backer of the Solvay Process Company.
- Dr. Rowland Robinson Hazard (1837-1921) was a founding member of the Caswell and Hazard company in 1874. The business was later reformed into Caswell-Massey and still operates today.
- Rowland Gibson Hazard (1855-1918) Republican Presidential Elector for Rhode Island, 1905 (voted for Theodore Roosevelt and Charles W. Fairbanks); alternate delegate to Republican National Convention from Rhode Island, 1912.
- Rowland Hazard III (1881–1945), was the great-grandson of Rowland G. Hazard and son of Rowland Hazard II. Rhode Island politician, businessman, and known as one of the people behind the formation of Alcoholics Anonymous.
- Thomas Pierrepont Hazard (1892–1968), was the grandson of Rowland G. Hazard and son of Rowland Hazard II. Rhode Island politician and candidate for U.S. Senate and U.S. House of Representatives.
- Caroline Hazard (1856–1945), sister of Frederick R. Hazard and granddaughter of Rowland, was a prolific author, artist, and president of Wellesley College, 1899–1910.
- Frederick Rowland Hazard Sr. (1858–1917) Delegate to Republican National Convention from New York, 1908; Republican Presidential Elector for New York, 1916
- Frederick Rowland Hazard Jr. (1891–1962) Served in the U.S. Army during World War I; delegate to Republican National Convention from Rhode Island, 1928; member of Rhode Island state house of representatives, 1929–31; major in the U.S. Army during World War II. Member, American Legion.
- Charles Michael Hazard (born 1931)

== Social activism ==
The family in Central New York was long active in May Memorial Unitarian Church, Syracuse, which linked many social activists. The family has been known especially for social concerns such as abolition of slavery, treatment of the insane and of alcoholics, as well for innovative employee programs. Guild Hall, built in 1890 by the Solvay Process Company to serve as a community center, provided the first public library facility which served the high school as well. Guild Hall was the first of five such buildings the company constructed for health and recreational use of the entire community.

The family's Peace Dale textile manufacturing company was one of the first in America (1878) to distribute a percentage of profits to employees. Mrs. Frederick R. Hazard (Dora G. Sedgwick) of Solvay was daughter of the prominent Syracuse lawyer and abolitionist Charles B. Sedgwick. The Sedgwick residence was a landmark designed by important American architect, Alexander Jackson Davis. Dora Sedgwick Hazard was an early American proponent of family planning, an organizer in central New York of the National Woman's Party, and of programs for African-American young people (which evolved into the Dunbar Center). Mrs. Hazard founded the Solvay Guild in 1887 and was instrumental in establishing its many local programs in areas of education, public health medical and dental clinics, day care center, sewing, cooking and Americanization classes, and the first kindergartens not merely in Solvay but in Syracuse. The Hazard Branch of the Onondaga County Library System contains a memorial plaque recalling the public service of Dora Sedgwick Hazard.

The Hazard family has been culturally oriented. Historic artifacts collected by Rowland G. Hazard II (1855–1918) became the Museum of Primitive Culture Records at Peace Dale. The family commissioned architects to design their projects. Douglas Smyth designed the company headquarters (1888) and probably designed nearby Guild Hall (1890), both of which are now razed.

== Notable homes ==
Upland Farm, the Frederick R. Hazard residence built in 1899; Joseph Lyman Silsbee, architect

The Hazards contributed land and resources for the Village of Solvay to grow. The residential neighborhood of Piercefield was developed as Upland Farm, the Hazard estate. The landmark Hazard mansion, designed by the nationally distinguished architect, Joseph Lyman Silsbee (1848–1913), unfortunately was demolished about the time of World War II. Silsbee also designed a fine residence and carriage house for Solvay Process Company engineer Edward N. Trump (1889), extant at 1912 West Genesee Street, Syracuse. Trump was one of the first company engineers, hired in 1882. Silsbee is well known for his landmark Syracuse Savings Bank building on Clinton Square, Syracuse. After moving his practice to Chicago, Silsbee employed the major American architect, Frank Lloyd Wright.

Two architecturally notable homes of Hazard daughters remain nearby in Piercefield, the Edwin Witherby House, c. 1912 (515 North Orchard Road) and the Martin Knapp House, 1910 (404 Piercefield Drive) Taylor and Bonta, architects, New York City. They were also architects of the University Club (extant, Washington Street on Fayette Park) and YWCA building (East Onondaga Street, demolished), both in Syracuse, New York.

== Offspring and marriages ==
Dorothy Hazard and husband Edwin Chaplin Witherby had three children: Constance Witherby, Thomas Hazard Witherby, and Frederick Roland Hazard Witherby, all born at Solvay. Edwin Chaplin Witherby died at Boston. Dorothy Hazard remarried at Narragansett, Rhode Island and with second husband, Stephen Foster Hunt, had a daughter, Deborah Hunt. Sarah Hazard and husband Martin Hobart Knapp moved from Solvay to Cazenovia, New York. There were four Knapp children: Robert Hazard Knapp, Peter Hobart Knapp, Sarah Knapp Auchincloss, Judith Knapp. Hazard family houses at Upland Farm, Piercefield in the Village of Solvay appear in that article.

Through the marriage of Commodore Mathew Hazard Perry's daughter Caroline Slidell to financier August Belmont, the extended Hazard family includes brothers Oliver Hazard Perry Belmont (1858–1908), American socialite, United States Representative from New York, and builder of Belcourt Castle, Perry Belmont (1851 – May 25, 1947), United States statesman, and August Belmont Jr. (1853–1924), American financier, builder of New York's Belmont Park racetrack, and major owner/breeder of thoroughbred racehorses.

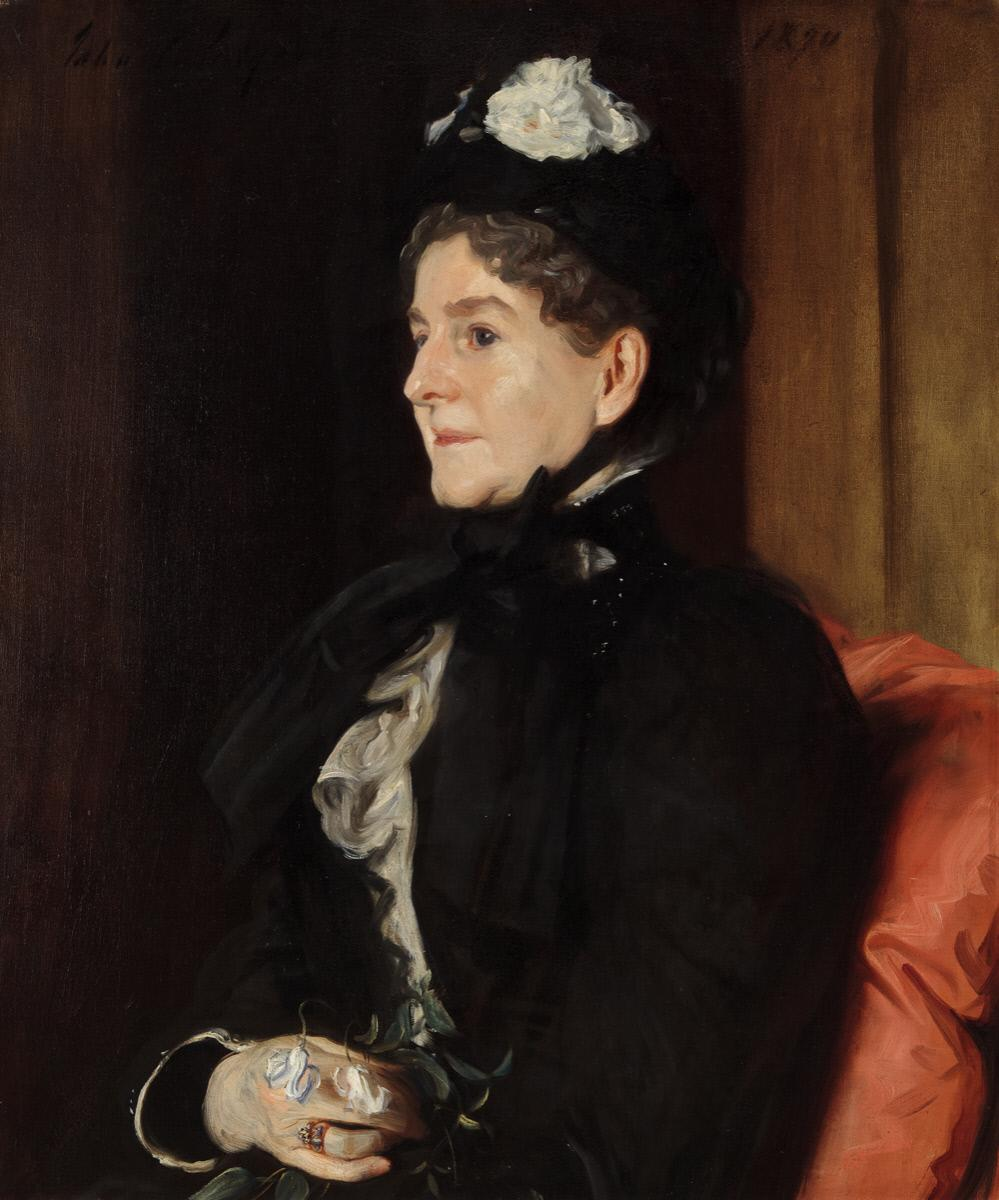
John Singer Sargent - Mrs. Alexander H. Bullock

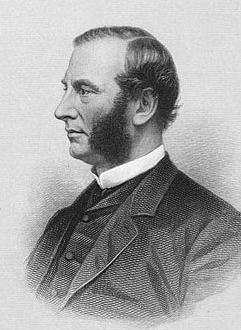
Alexander Bullock

Elvira Hazard Bullock (1824-1894, eldest daughter of Augustus George Hazard, married Alexander Hamilton Bullock (1816-1882), Governor of Massachusetts from 1866-1869. Bullock was first elected to the Massachusetts House of Representatives as a Whig in 1844, serving until 1848; for two years he was chairman of the Judiciary Committee. In 1849 he served in the Massachusetts Senate. Elvira's portrait by John Singer Sargent, painted in 1890, hangs in the Worcester Art Museum. Their daughter, Fanny Bullock Workman, (1859-1925) was an accomplished mountaineer, explorer, cartographer, and world traveler. In 1897 she cycled through India. She climbed multiple peaks in the Himalayas, succeeding in ten major ascents. In 1899 Fanny an altitude record for women at the time. Her daughter Rachel, Lady MacRobert, née Workman (23 March 1884 – 1 September 1954) was a geologist, cattle breeder and an active feminist.

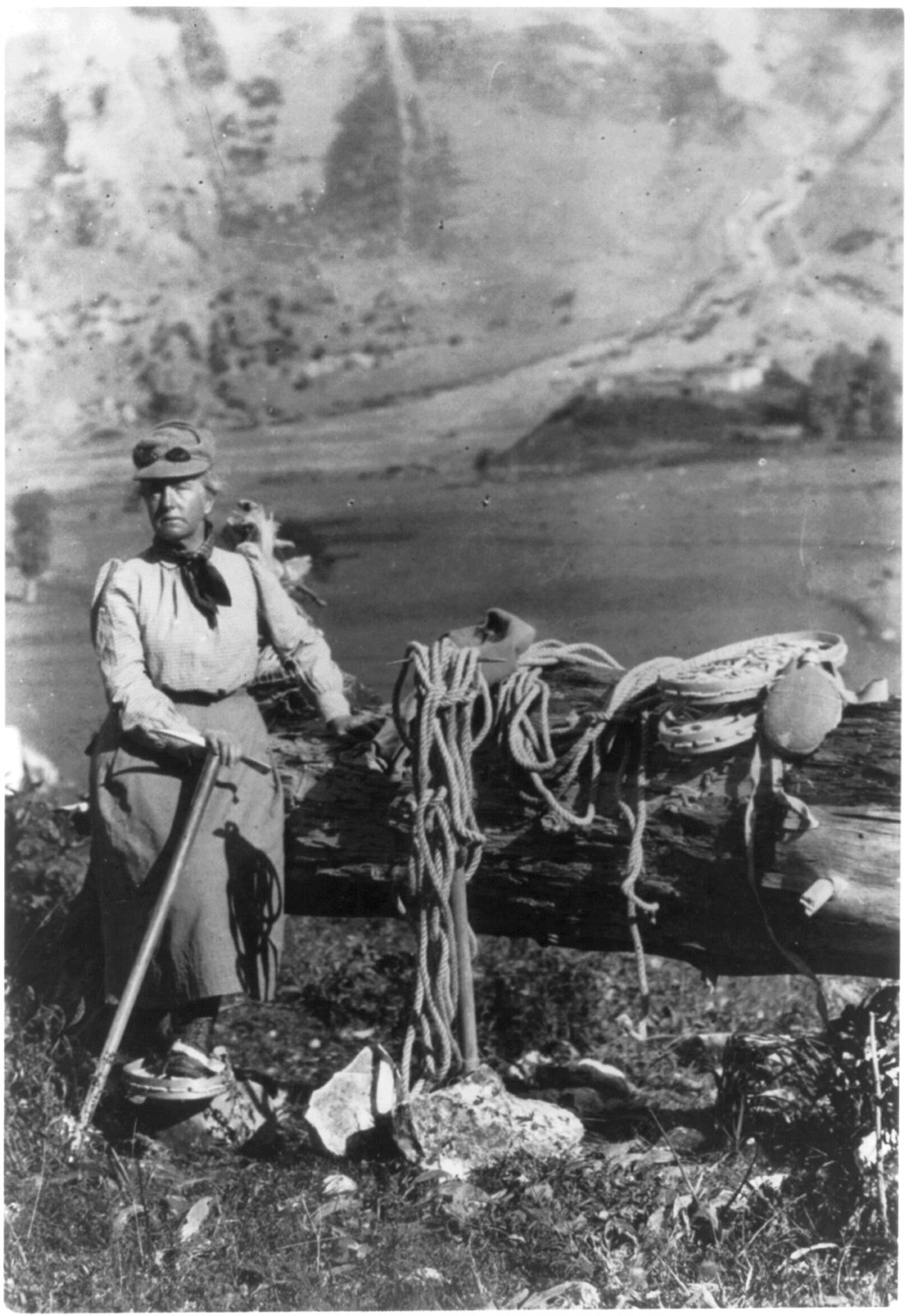
Fannie Bullock Workman posed on mountain with mountain climbing gear LCCN2003654719

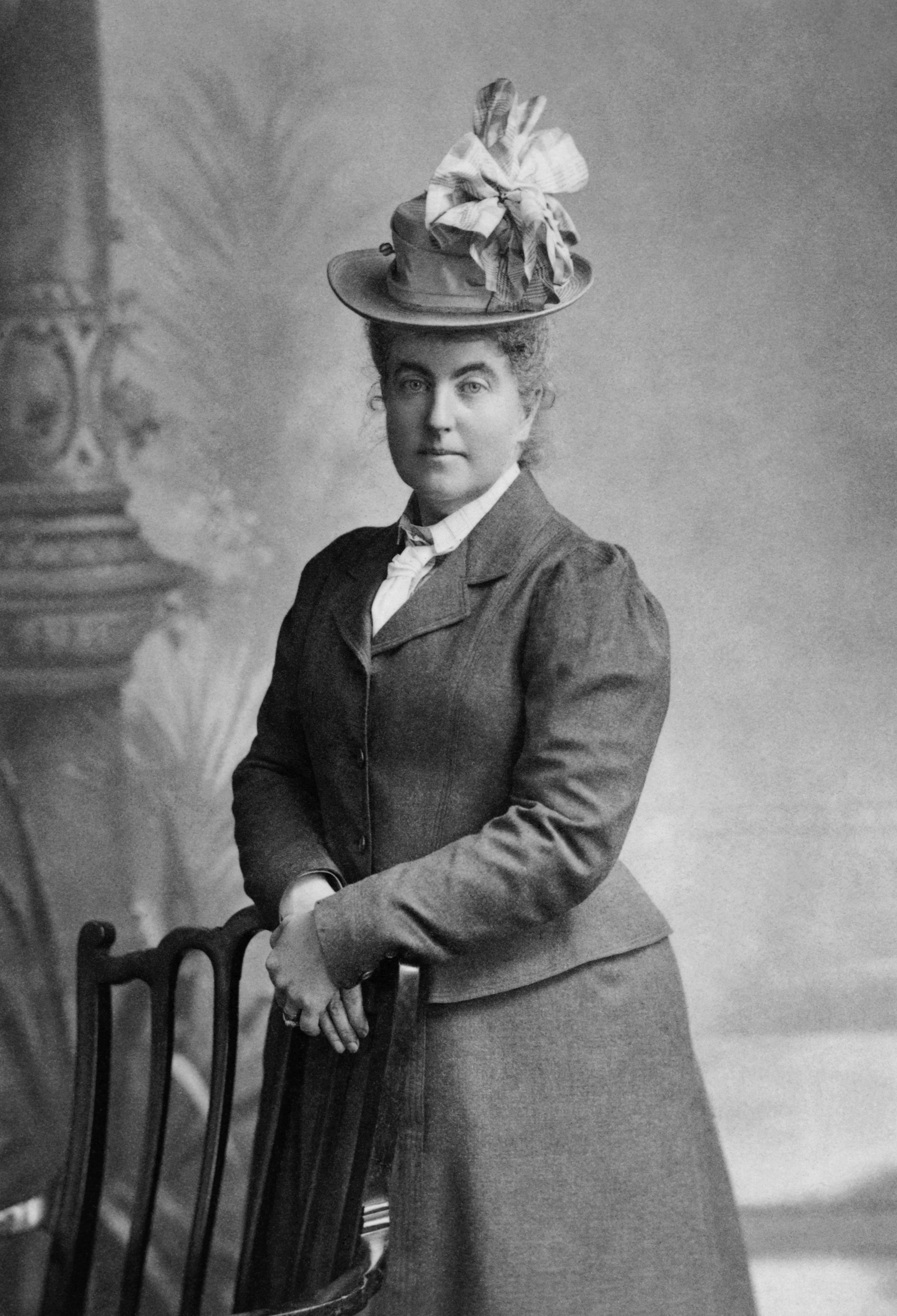
Maull & Fox - Fanny Bullock Workman
