= Young William (1794 ship) =

History

France
- Builder: Nantes
- Launched: 1791
- Captured: 1794

Great Britain
- Name: Young William
- Owner: Daniel Bennett
- Acquired: 1794 by purchase
- Captured: Captured and burnt 1810

General characteristics
- Tons burthen: 330, or 333, or 337 (bm)
- Length: 96 ft 10 in (29.5 m)
- Beam: 28 ft 10 in (8.8 m)
- Propulsion: Sails
- Sail plan: Brig
- Complement: 35
- Armament: 1795: 8 × 6-pounder guns; 1803: 14 × 6- & 18-pounder guns
- Notes: Two decks and three masts

The vessel that would become Young William was built in 1791 at Nantes. The British captured her in 1794 and Daniel Bennett purchased her that year. She then went on to make 10 voyages for him. French privateers captured her twice, but on the first occasion the British Royal Navy recaptured her, and on the second her captor did not keep her. Still, the French Navy captured and burnt her in 1810 on her eleventh voyage.

== Career ==
Daniel Bennet, who owned 56 ships over his career, purchased the ship and renamed her. Her first captain was Henry Mackie (or Machey, or Mackay, or Mackey), and he would go on to sail her on her first three whaling voyages.

Voyage #1: Young William sailed in 1794 for South Georgia. She returned on 25 July 1795 with 260 tuns whale oil and 6023 seal skins.

Voyage #2 Young William sailed on 22 July 1796 for South Georgia. She was at South Georgia in 1796. She was reported on 23 March 1797 at Scilly with Captain Framer and the crew of the American snow Sally lost at South Georgia 28 March 1796. Young William returned to Britain on 28 May 1797.

Voyage #3 Young William sailed on 28 July 1797 and returned on 24 June 1798.

Captain Charles Bacon would be Young William's captain for her next six voyages.

Voyage #4: Young William sailed on 30 July 1798 and returned on 2 July 1799.

Voyage #5: Young William sailed in 1799 and returned on 29 August 1800.

Voyage #6: Young William sailed on 17 October 1800 and returned on 26 February 1802. Just before she returned the French privateer Gironde captured Young William, but HMS Fisgard captured Gironde and recaptured Young William, and some other vessels, including Joseph, another returning whaler. (Note: Gironde was armed with 16 guns and had a crew of 141 men. She also had on board 53 men, the captains and crew of the four British merchant vessels she had captured. Captain T.B. Martin of Fisgard reported that Young William, Charles Bacon, master, was returning from the South Seas laden with oil. Gironde had been commissioned in 1801 in Bordeaux under François Avesou.) Young William was taken into Cork.

Young William was valued at £6,000.

Voyage #7: Young William sailed on 11 June 1802 and was at Boavista on 6 July 1802. She returned on 3 June 1803.

Voyage #8: Charles Bacon received a letter of marque on 30 June 1803. Young William sailed in July 1803. Some time between August and early December, she captured Meuw Schrueder, which had been sailing from Batavia to Amsterdam, and brought her into Plymouth. Young William returned in May 1804.

Voyage #9: Young William sailed on 11 June 1804 for South Georgia. She was reported to have been "well" there in February or March 1805. The French privateer Bellone captured her near the Cape of Good Hope later in 1805, but gave her up. Young William returned to Britain on 15 October 1805.

In 1806 Young William was rebuilt at Topsham. Captain William Watson replaced Bacon for Young William's last two voyages.

Voyage #10: Young William sailed on 14 January 1807, bound for the Isle of Desolation, via Port Jackson. (Note: There are three candidate islands, with the most probable, given its location relative to Australia, being the Kerguelen Islands, and the second most probable being Desolation Island.) Young William arrived at Port Jackson on 7 July, where she delivered stores. She then left on 14 September for the fisheries. Young William left Desolation Island on 15 December 1808, and reached St Helena on 11 February 1809. She left for London on 28 February, and arrived there in May.

== Loss ==
Voyage #11: Captain Watson sailed from Britain on 7 July 1809. One or more French frigates captured and burnt Young William off Madagascar in 1810.
