= Hazard, Washington =

Unincorporated community in Washington, United States

Hazard
- Unincorporated community
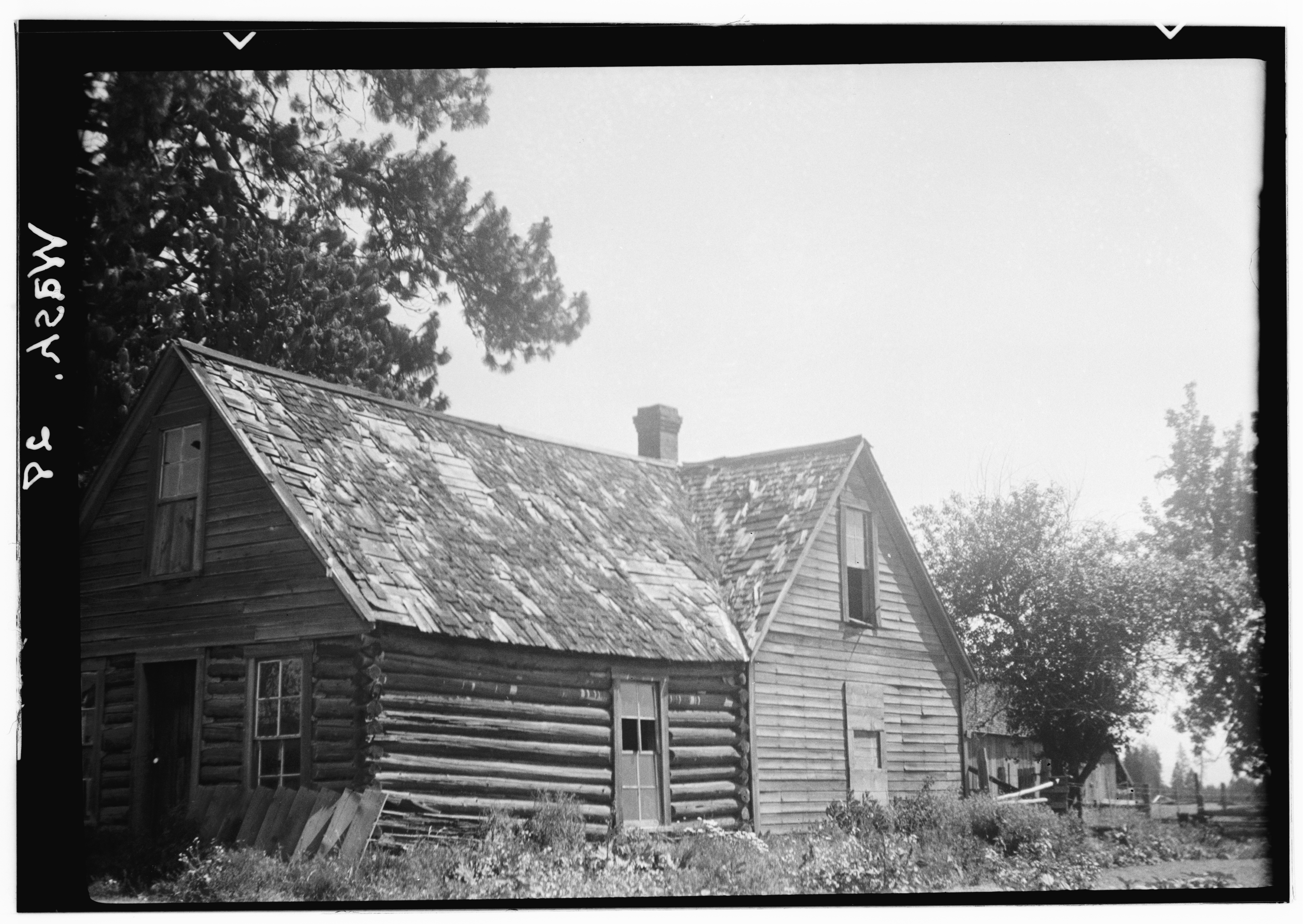
- Hazard Post Office

- Location within the state of Washington
- Coordinates: 47°52′40″N 117°31′08″W
- Country: United States
- State: Washington
- County: Spokane
- Elevation: 2,145 ft (654 m)
- Time zone: UTC-8 (Pacific (PST))
  - Summer (DST): UTC-7 (PDT)
- ZIP codes: 99006
- GNIS feature ID: 1514873

Hazard is an unincorporated community in Spokane County, in the U.S. state of Washington.

== Geography ==
Hazard is located on the Wild Rose Prairie, a region of farmland in northern Spokane County between U.S. Route 395 and the Stevens County. The county line is about one mile west of Hazard. There is no defined community center at Hazard, the location is dominated by farms with structures and homes spread out hundreds of feet apart.

Hazard is about 12 miles by road northeast of the suburban and commercial fringes of the Spokane urban area.

== History ==
A post office called Hazard was established in 1885, and remained in operation until 1904. The community was named after R. R. Hazard, a local merchant.
