= Rowland Hazard III =

American politician

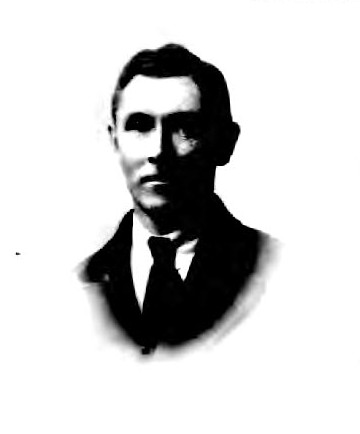
- Hazard, c. 1921

Member of the Rhode Island Senate from South Kingstown
- In office January 5, 1915 – January 2, 1917
- Preceded by: Edmund Walker
- Succeeded by: Grafton Kenyon

Personal details
- Born: 29 October 1881 Peace Dale, Rhode Island, US
- Died: 20 December 1945 (aged 64) Waterbury, Connecticut, US
- Resting place: Oak Dell Cemetery, South Kingstown, Rhode Island, US
- Party: Republican
- Children: Caroline Campbell Hazard; Rowland Gibson Hazard IV; Peter Hamilton Hazard; Charles Ware Blake Hazard
- Parent(s): Rowland Gibson Hazard II; Mary Pierrepont Bushnell
- Relatives: Thomas P. Hazard (brother)
- Education: Yale University (BA)

Rowland Hazard III (October 29, 1881 – December 20, 1945) was an American businessman. He is also known as the "Rowland H." who figured prominently in the events leading to the formation of Alcoholics Anonymous.

== Family and early life ==
Rowland Hazard III was born into one of Rhode Island's oldest and most prominent families, the Hazard family. He was the eldest of five children of Rowland Gibson Hazard II (1855–1918) and Mary Pierrepont Bushnell (1859–1936). Although several generations of Hazard men bore the name Rowland, the Rowland Hazard born in 1881 adopted the name suffix "III" to distinguish himself from his well-known forebears. According to biographers, Rowland III was known as "Roy" to the Hazard family. He was a graduate of the Taft School and received his Bachelor of Arts degree from Yale University in 1903, where he was a member of the Elihu Club at the time it became a secret Senior Society. Among his Yale classmates, he was known as "Ike" or "Rowley."

Hazard married Helen Hamilton Campbell (1889–1946), a graduate of Briarcliff Manor College and daughter of a Chicago banker, in October 1910. The couple divorced in 1929, but remarried in 1931. They had one daughter, Caroline Campbell Hazard (1911–1953), and three sons, Capt. Rowland Gibson Hazard (1917–1944), Peter Hamilton Hazard (1918–1944), and Charles Ware Blake Hazard (1920–1995). Two of their sons, Capt. Rowland G. and Peter Hamilton Hazard, were killed in World War II.

The pioneering psychiatrist Carl Jung was known to two of Rowland Hazard III's early friends. Yet it was Hazard's famous encounter with Jung that began alcoholics’ connection with the Oxford Group.

Hazard is also attributed as the commissioner of the oldest boy scout troop in Rhode Island, Troop 1 Wakefield in South Kingstown.

Like his father, Hazard was a member of the Rhode Island Society of Colonial Wars.

== Business interests ==
Although he briefly served in the Rhode Island state senate (1914–1916), Rowland Hazard III was primarily a businessman throughout his career. He was active in the Hazard family's primary enterprise, the Peace Dale Manufacturing Company, until its sale to M.T. Stevens and Sons in 1918. He was also involved in the Solvay Process Company and the Semet-Solvay Company.

Rowland III was instrumental in completing his father's ambition to play a leading role in the formation of the Allied Chemical and Dye Corporation (later AlliedSignal, then Honeywell following a 1999 merger with that company). From 1921 until 1927, he was affiliated with Lee, Higginson and Company, a New York banking firm. He organized La Luz Clay Products Company near his ranch in La Luz, New Mexico. Later in his career, he became an executive vice president of the Bristol Manufacturing Company, a maker of precision instruments based in Waterbury, Connecticut. He was a director with several companies in addition to Allied Chemical and Dye, including the Rhode Island Hospital Trust Company, the Interlake Iron Company, and Merchant's Bank of Providence, Rhode Island.

== Relationship to the Oxford Group and the formation of Alcoholics Anonymous ==
Rowland Hazard III's struggles with alcoholism led to his direct involvement in the chain of events that gave rise to what is today Alcoholics Anonymous (AA), where he is remembered as "Rowland H.," though Rowland himself never actually joined AA. His own efforts at recovery were markedly influenced by his consultation with pioneering psychologist Carl Jung and his subsequent involvement with the Oxford Group, one of the most highly visible Christian Evangelical movements of the 1920s and '30s. Recent research by R.M. Dubiel further suggests that Rowland may have also been treated by Courtenay Baylor, a lay therapist of the psycho-spiritual therapeutic effort known as the Emmanuel Movement.

Though Rowland is not named, his experience with Jung is described in the book Alcoholics Anonymous. According to this account, Jung pronounced Rowland a chronic alcoholic and therefore hopeless and beyond the reach of medicine as it was at the time (a credible opinion, considering Jung's role in the early development of psychoanalysis and then, after he left, of analytical psychology ). The only hope Jung said he could offer was for a life-changing "vital spiritual experience"—an experience which Jung regarded as a phenomenon. Jung further advised that Rowland's affiliation with a church did not spell the necessary "vital" experience.

This prognosis so shook Rowland that he sought out the Oxford Group. The Group was dedicated to what its members termed "the Four Absolutes" as the summary of the Sermon on the Mount: absolute honesty, absolute purity, absolute unselfishness, and absolute love. The Group was dedicated to the vigorous pursuit of personal change, and to extending its message by means of "personal" evangelism: one changed person sharing their experience with another (see Oxford Group).

Rowland was following the Oxford Group emphasis on personal evangelism through the example of personal change when he came in contact with an alcoholic named Ebby Thacher while Rowland and two other Oxford Group members who knew Thacher were summering in Glastenbury, Vermont, in 1934. Thacher was the son of a prominent New York family who, like many well-to-do Eastern US families of the period, summered in New England, forming lifelong associations and friendships with other "summer people" as well as with permanent residents of the area. Upon learning that Ebby was on the verge of commitment to the Brattleboro Retreat (the former Vermont Asylum for the Insane) on account of his drinking, Rowland and fellow Oxford Group members Shep (F. Shepard) Cornell and Cebra Graves sought out Ebby and shared with him their Oxford Group recovery experiences. Graves was the son of the family court magistrate in Ebby's case, Collins Graves, and the Oxford Groupers were able to arrange for Ebby's release into their care. This led to Ebby's acceptance of the principles of the Oxford Group and his own sobriety. Encouraged in the example of personal evangelism, Ebby later sought out an acquaintance of his own, Bill W.

Bill (William G.) Wilson was raised in Vermont near the summer homes of Rowland Hazard, Ebby Thacher and others who had found release from their alcoholism in the Oxford Group. Ebby had been a "drinking buddy" of Wilson's over many years. By late 1934, Wilson was on the verge of total alcoholic collapse, living off his wife's income in the couple's Brooklyn, New York, home, when Ebby paid him a visit. Ebby shared with Bill the message of recovery through the application of spiritual principles, famously encouraging Bill to choose his own conception of God. This visit with Ebby set in motion a series of circumstances that led to Bill's own recovery from alcoholism in late 1934. Bill Wilson went on, with Dr. Robert H. ("Dr. Bob") Smith of Akron, Ohio, to carry the Oxford Group message of spiritual recovery to other alcoholics. The group of recovering alcoholics founded by Wilson and Smith would later break away from the Oxford Group to become Alcoholics Anonymous by 1939.

The Oxford Group renamed itself Moral Re-Armament in 1938, and largely faded from the prominence it had enjoyed in the 1930s. Moral Re-Armament would eventually become a non-religious humanitarian organization, changing its name to Initiatives of Change in 2001.

This version of Rowland's story is commonly accepted within AA, confirmed in substance if not in detailed fact by evidence such as an exchange of letters between Bill Wilson and Carl Jung in 1961, in which Jung acknowledged his acquaintance with "Rowland H." Jung also made reference to his treatment of an unnamed alcoholic member of the Oxford Group in a 1954 talk, transcribed and recorded in Volume 18 of his Collected Works, The Symbolic Life.

== Dispute and confirmation of the historical account ==
More recently, scholars have questioned this traditional account. In a 1954 recollection of his early life and the beginnings of AA, Bill Wilson stated that "A well-known American businessman named Rowland Hazard had gone to Zurich, Switzerland, probably in the year 1930 [...] as the court of last resort [...]. Hazard remained with Jung a whole year; desperately wanting to resolve his problem..." Wilson reiterates this approximate timing in his 1961 letter to Jung: "Having exhausted other means of recovery from his alcoholism, it was about 1931 that [Hazard] became your patient. I believe he remained under your care for perhaps a year."

These recollections of Bill W. have become the basis of assumption for dating Rowland's initial consultation with Jung in the approximate period of 1930–31. More recent investigation into the historical record does not support this timing. Based on research of Hazard family records of the Rhode Island Historical Society, author Richard M. Dubiel suggested in a 2004 work that the period during which Rowland could have consulted with Jung in this time frame may have been limited to some time between June and September 1931, and perhaps only a few weeks within that span.

This confusion of the historical record appears to have been subsequently resolved by researchers Amy Colwell Bluhm and Cora Finch who, though working independently, were both aided substantially by Hazard family letters and papers in the Beinecke Rare Book and Manuscript Library at Yale University. According to both Bluhm and Finch, these Hazard family documents clearly place Rowland in Jung's care for some months beginning in 1926 rather than 1930 or 1931. It appears likely that Wilson was simply repeating Cebra G.'s (inaccurate) recollection of the dates of Rowland's initial treatment by Jung.

These more recent investigations also shed additional light on Rowland's treatment beyond his consultation with Jung. In his 2004 work, Dubiel also discovered evidence that Rowland was likely treated in the early 1930s by Courtenay Baylor, himself a recovering alcoholic and proponent of the so-called Emmanuel Movement. Inspired by Episcopal clergyman Dr. Elwood Worcester of Boston's Emmanuel Episcopal Church, the Emmanuel Movement began in 1906 as an effort to treat what would today be regarded as psychological afflictions and disorders such as alcoholism through the application of spiritual principles. The work of the Emmanuel Movement was largely carried on by Baylor after Worcester's death.

Rowland's sobriety does not appear to have been continuous, at least in early years. Bluhm and Finch find suggestions in Hazard family letters of Rowland's possible alcoholic relapse during a trip to Africa in 1927–28. Dubiel also documents a 1936 binge, but it is unclear if Rowland drank intermittently thereafter, if at all, for the remainder of his life. Dubiel notes that Rowland's later years "appear to have been prosperous enough," and included his joining the Episcopal Church in 1936, in which he remained active for the rest of his life. Rowland never joined AA himself.
