= Hazzard (disambiguation) =

Hazzard may refer to:

- The Hazzards, a US band
- Hazzard, a German band

== People ==
- Alvira Hazzard (1898-1953), American writer
- Brad Hazzard (born 1951), Australian politician
- Brittany Hazzard (born 1990), American songwriter, singer and rapper known professionally as Starrah
- Chris Hazzard (born 1985), Northern Irish Sinn Féin politician
- David Hazzard (1781–1864), American merchant and politician
- Johnny Hazzard (born 1977), American pornographic actor and recording artist
- Linda Hazzard (1867–1938), American doctor
- Margaret Hazzard (died 1987), Australian author native to Norfolk Island
- Noel Hazzard, Australian rugby league footballer
- Shirley Hazzard (1931–2016), Australian born author of fiction and non-fiction
- Tony Hazzard (born 1943), English singer and songwriter
- Walt Hazzard (1942–2011), American basketball player

== Media ==
- Mark Hazzard: Merc, a comic book series published by Marvel Comics under their New Universe imprint

== See also ==
- Hazard (disambiguation)
- The Dukes of Hazzard, an American television series
