= Rowland G. Hazard =

American industrialist and businessman

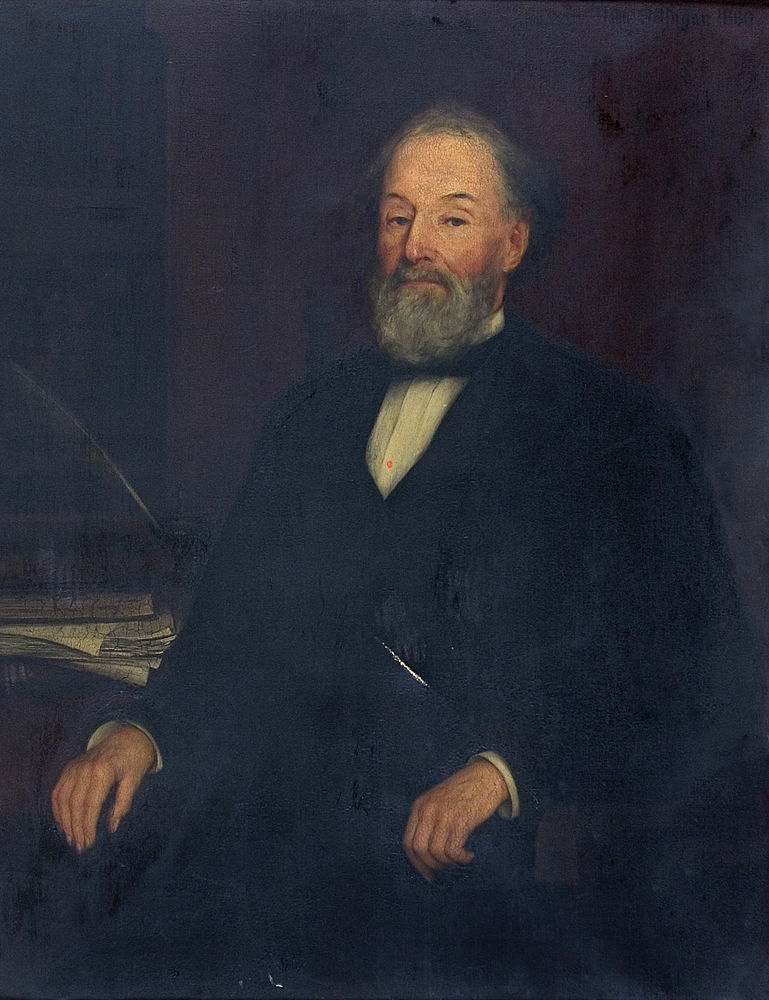
- Portrait of Hazard by Jean Paul Selinger, 1880

Member of the Rhode Island House of Representatives
- In office 1880–1880
- In office 1854–1855
- In office 1851–1852

Member of the Rhode Island State Senate
- In office 1866–1867

Personal details
- Born: Rowland Gibson Hazard; October 9, 1801 South Kingstown, Rhode Island, U.S.
- Died: June 24, 1888 (aged 86) Peace Dale, Rhode Island, U.S.
- Party: Republican
- Spouse: Caroline Newbold (m. 1828; died 1869)
- Relations: Thomas Robinson Hazard (brother); Caroline Hazard (granddaughter)
- Children: Rowland Gibson Hazard II; John Newbold Hazard
- Parent(s): Rowland Hazard; Mary Peace Hazard

Rowland Gibson Hazard (October 9, 1801 – June 24, 1888) was an American industrialist, politician, textile merchant, and social reformer. He was a descendant of the prominent settler Thomas Hazard, progenitor of the American Hazard Family, who migrated from England during the Great Puritan Migration of 1630 and settled Rhode Island in the 1600s. While he had links to southern slaveholding states, he is noted for his public stand against slavery.

== Early life ==
Hazard was born on October 9, 1801, in South Kingstown in Washington County, Rhode Island. He was one of nine children born to the former Mary Peace (1775–1852) and Rowland Hazard (1764–1836). His mother was raised in Charleston, South Carolina, and spent a year studying in London as a girl. His father founded the Peace Dale Manufacturing Company in Peace Dale, Rhode Island, in 1802. Among his siblings was older brothers Isaac Peace Hazard and Thomas Robinson Hazard.

A descendant of an old New England Quaker family, Hazard was a fifth-great-grandson of Thomas Hazard, one of the nine founding settlers of Newport on Aquidneck Island in the Colony of Rhode Island and Providence Plantations, and a member of the longstanding Hazard Family of New England. His paternal grandparents were Thomas Hazard and Elizabeth (née Robinson) Hazard, herself a daughter of William Robinson, the Deputy Governor of the Colony of Rhode Island and Providence Plantations.

Hazard grew up in Bristol, Pennsylvania, in the home of his maternal grandfather, merchant Isaac Peace and Elizabeth (née Gibson) Peace, who were both originally from Barbados, but relocated to Charleston before eventually settling in Bristol. His mother was almost exclusively in Bristol from 1807 to 1820, helping to care for her grandfather until his death. He was educated in a Quaker boarding school in Burlington, New Jersey, where he developed a particular interest in mathematics.

== Career ==
In 1819, he returned to Rhode Island to join his elder brother Isaac in the management of the Peace Dale Manufacturing Company. A third brother, Joseph P. Hazard, became a partner in the Peace Dale operation in 1828, and the business took the name "R.G. Hazard & Co." One of Rowland Hazard's responsibilities was selling the company's products to planters in the southern United States, particularly Louisiana, Alabama and Mississippi.

In 1843, Hazard acquired a textile mill complex at the village now known as Carolina, Rhode Island, and renamed the mill and its surrounding village in honor of his wife. The Carolina Mills Company remained in family ownership until 1863 and was operated by his son Rowland II until at least 1877.

After an 1845 fire destroyed one of the mill buildings, the brothers built new facilities, including expanded hydropower systems and a fireproof stone factory.

In 1848, the partnership incorporated, becoming the Peace Dale Manufacturing Company, with Isaac P. Hazard as president and Rowland Hazard as secretary/treasurer. In 1849 the business started a transition into making woolen shawls and other high-quality woolens instead of cheaper fabrics.

=== Abolitionist activities ===
From about 1833 to 1842, Hazard spent his winters in New Orleans to sell goods, including cotton bagging cloth, pre-cut garments, low-priced shoes, and raw "Negro cloth" for use by African-American slaves.

According to his granddaughter, Hazard considered that "the greatest effort of his life" began when he was in New Orleans on business in the winter of 1841 when he learned that a free African-American man from Newport was being held in custody in Louisiana as an escaped slave. Hazard's investigations found that many free African-Americans were being detained under the assumption they were escaped slaves. He worked with Jacob Barker, then a New Orleans lawyer, to obtain freedom for nearly 100 people being held as slaves. The action later led to charges being filed against several public officials who were responsible for the illegal detentions. Hazard's antislavery sentiments were based on his expectation that slaveholders should respect the right of the northerners to criticize and disregard the congressional imperative to return former slaves. His business, however, was still reliant on the institution of slavery and so he maintained support for white southerners, practice of race-based slavery.

His involvement with abolitionist causes and in the Republican Party eventually caused his company to lose favor with its markets in the southern United States. This helped to prompt the Peace Dale mills' transition from making cheap cotton products to selling higher quality woolens.

=== Political career ===
Hazard served three one-year terms in the Rhode Island House of Representatives, winning election as a state representative in 1851, 1854 and 1880. He also was a state senator from 1866 to 1867. In 1856, he was one of Rhode Island's delegates to the founding convention of the Republican party. Four years later he was a delegate to the 1860 Republican National Convention.

In 1851, Hazard introduced a bill to the Rhode Island Assembly that proposed railroad companies should be responsible for providing an equal benefit to the public as they had a "habit of annexing private property." In 1854, while serving in the state legislature, he made a speech criticizing the Stonington Railroad Company for charging discriminatory rates for both freight and passengers. Shortly thereafter, the railroad company retaliated by refusing to let Hazard ride on one of its trains. Resolutions passed by the South Kingstown Town Council in reaction to his treatment are said to have formed "the germ of" the Interstate Commerce Law of 1886.

=== Later life ===
Hazard retired from the textile business in 1866 and invested in the Union Pacific Railroad. After Union Pacific fell into financial disarray and became a party to the Crédit Mobilier scandal of 1872, Hazard spent much time dealing with the company's financial affairs. Hazard was also a prolific writer in the fields of philosophy, economics, and politics.

"As a public benefactor, Hazard contributed to the schools and churches in South Kingstown and endowed a professorship of physics at Brown University with a gift of $40,000." Brown awarded him an honorary A.M. degree in 1845 and an LL.D. degree in 1869.

== Personal life ==
In 1828 he married Caroline Newbold (1807–1869) of Bucks County, Pennsylvania. Caroline was the daughter of John Newbold and Elizabeth (née Lawrie) Newbold. The couple had two sons:

- Rowland Gibson Hazard II (1829–1898), who married Margaret Anna Rood (1834–1895) and owned the Solvay Process Company.
- John Newbold Hazard (1836–1900), who first married Hortense DeHuys in France. He later married Augusta G. Gurloff (1850–1917) and built the Narragansett Pier Railroad.

Hazard died in Peace Dale on June 24, 1888, and was buried at Oak Dell Cemetery in South Kingstown.

=== Descendants ===
Through his son Rowland, he was the grandfather of Rowland Gibson Hazard III (1855–1918), Caroline Hazard (1856–1945), Frederick Rowland Hazard (1858–1917), Helen Hazard (1861–1925), and Margaret Hazard (1867–1940). Caroline was an educator and author who served as the fifth president of Wellesley College, and Rowland (father of Rowland Hazard III) and Frederick were both executives with the Solvay Process Company. Frederick is today known for hiring noted architect Joseph Lyman Silsbee to build Upland Farm, his 1899 residence built in Solvay, New York. Helen married Nathaniel T. Bacon and Margaret married the economist, statistician, inventor, and Progressive social campaigner Irving Fisher.

Through his son John, he was the grandfather of Mary Peace Hazard (1874–1958), who married Rowland R. Robinson (1862–1934).

== Published works ==
- Language or Essay on Language (1835)
- Causes of Decline of Political Morality (1841)
- Freedom of Mind in Willing (1866)
- Causation and Freedom in Willing (1869)
- The Duty of Individuals to Support Science and Literature (essay; 1885)
