= HMS Hazard's Prize =

Sloop of the Royal Navy

History

France
- Name: Subtile
- Builder: Dunkerque
- Captured: 1756

Great Britain
- Name: Hazard's Prize
- Acquired: 1756 by purchase of a prize
- Fate: Sold 1759

General characteristics
- Tons burthen: 10072/94, or (bm)
- Length: Overall:61 ft 9 in (18.8 m); Keel:48 ft 7 in (14.8 m)
- Beam: 19 ft 9 in (6.0 m)
- Depth of hold: 8 ft 11 2/3 in (2.7 m)
- Sail plan: Snow
- Complement: Privateer:86; Royal Navy:60
- Armament: 8 × 4-pounder guns + 12 × ½-pounder swivel guns

HMS Hazard's Prize (or Hazard Prize) was the French privateer Subtile, which HMS Hazard captured on 28 August 1756 and which the Royal Navy took into service. She was out of service a year later and the Navy sold her in 1759.

== Capture ==
On 1 September 1756 HMS Hazard captured the privateer snow Subtile off Lowestoff. Subtile was armed with 12 guns and had a crew of 86 men under the command of Jean Baptiste Tate. During the six-hour engagement Subtile's crew twice tried to board Hazard, but the British repulsed them. Subtile struck off Winterton. Her crew were taken ashore the next day and lodged in the local jail. Fourteen managed to tunnel out, but one man got stuck and his cries for help alerted the guards, who succeeded in recapturing four men.

== Royal Navy service ==
The Admiralty purchased her for £350, having named her Hazard's Prize. Commander James Smith commanded her from 10 November 1756 until 23 March 1757 when she had completed fitting. Lieutenant John Dalrymple then commissioned her cruising and convoy escort. Dalrymple received promotion to commander on 23 March 1757. The Admiralty surveyed Hazard's Prize twice, the first time on 20 August after she had been paid off on 10 August. Dalrymple removed to the sloop HMS Albany.

Hazard's Prize remained listed but not in service until she was surveyed for the second time on 31 May 1759.

== Fate ==
The Navy sold her for £546 6s 11d at Woolwich on 21 June.
