= Hazard (Overwatch) =

Fictional character in the Overwatch franchise

- Overwatch character
- First game: Overwatch 2 (2024)
- Voiced by: Conor McLeod

In-universe information
- Class: Tank
- Origin: Glasgow, Scotland
- Nationality: Scottish

Hazard is the alias of Findlay Docherty, a character who first appeared in the 2023 video game Overwatch 2, a Blizzard Entertainment–developed first-person hero shooter.

== Conception and development ==
According to Blizzard's lead gameplay designer Alec Dawson, their goal with Hazard was to create a versatile tank hero that could play well both offensively and defensively, with high mobility using the Vault and Violent Leap abilities. Hazard was originally named "Spiker" in early development, intended to be a major villain character, but over time, they refined his personality to have more "rebellious charm" while still retaining his powerful form.

== Appearances ==
Hazard, real name Findlay Docherty, is a Scottish member of the Phreaks, a punk-like revolutionary group, and outfitted with several illicit cybernetic attachments. After leaving his broken home, he enlisted in the armed forces to earn money for a university education, but was caught in the crashing of a downed Overwatch jet, costing him both legs and an arm. Though fitted with standard prosthetics and paid for his service, Hazard sought out the Phreaks, who dealt with illegal body modifications. The Phreaks helped to outfit him with new powerful augmentations, and he joined their goal to break down the "system" of the elites in the world. During a raid on Moira's laboratory at Oasis University, Hazard absorbed an unstable form of vanadium ferrofluid under study there (the map having reflected this change in Season 13). The element gave Hazard superhuman powers including the ability to form and launch spikes at enemies.

Hazard is voiced by Conor McLeod.

=== Gameplay ===
His primary attack is Bonespur, his arm augment that fires a shotgun-like spread of crystal spikes. He can perform a Violent Leap towards an enemy and slash them with a blade from his other arm. His Spike Guard grants him temporary damage reduction while launching homing spikes at enemies; this ability also reloads ammunition for Bonespur. He can further create a Jagged Wall in front of him that knocks back foes near it and continues to hurt them if they get close, while also providing temporary cover for Hazard and his teammates. Hazard possesses a passive Vault ability that lets him climb over small walls and obstacles, including his Jagged Wall. His ultimate is Downpour, launching spikes from his back that fall onto enemies, damaging and immobilizing them for a brief period.

== Promotion and reception ==
Hazard was first teased at the 2023 Blizzcon event, and was made available to test publicly for all players in November 2024. He was fully added to the roster in December 2024.

Paolo Josiel Arias of Game Rant observed that some fans expressed disappointment in regards to Hazard's design, having grown attached to the originally pitched Phreak design. Arias commented that while that Phreak's green mohawk and overall look suited that character, it did not fit Hazard, and agreed with others that deviating from that concept helped make visually distinct from another character with similar themes in the game, Junker Queen. Other fans meanwhile expressed that they preferred Hazard's earlier design concepts, which Arias compared visually to the anime series Cyberpunk: Edgerunners.

Others meanwhile argued in favor of some of the character's earlier concepts which featured him with aspects such as multiple legs and a stinger or a thorned cloak. Arias acknowledged that while Hazard's completely design fit a bruiser archetype, it did make his silhouette close to those of similar characters such as Reinhardt or Mauga, and felt a more distinct appearance would have benefited him. Despite these criticisms, he appreciated the argument that Hazard's purple highlights and spikes made him resemble the thistle, Scotland's national flower which represents resilience and courage, aspects he felt the character's personality reflected. He further argued that Hazard was not unique in these criticisms, and hoped as with other characters fans would warm up to him in time.

Bayani Miguel Acebedo of Gfinity eSports echoed the Edgerunners comparison, feeling that Hazard's appearance would fit "right at home" in that setting's Night City. The supplemental media around Hazard furthered this parallel for Acebedo, and he drew comparisons to the series' protagonist, David, who like Hazard he was also pushing back against a system that had failed him while undergoing several physical enhancements along the way. He also pointed out how Hazard's arm blade resembled the "Mantis Blades" seen in the Cyberpunk franchise. He found the Phreaks to be a homage in line with others in the series, and an interesting faction addition to Overwatch's world, feeling that such helped make its lore rich.

Overwatch was nominated for the 2025 IGDA GAconf awards for representation due to Hazard's portrayal of experiencing limb loss and the struggle to obtain prosthetics. Rhi Easby of Rolling Stone magazine cited Hazard as an example of how Overwatch positively showed characters with disability using prosthetics, praising the development team's mindset of "optimistic futurism" that showed that everyone could thrive in that world regardless of impairment, an aspect she felt helped keep it above similar games in its genre. She further felt Hazard's story was relatable to anyone that had to have dealt with subpar medical coverage or lack of government investment, further describing him as "a successful character" that reflected disillusionment in the current state of the world while striving to want better.
