= Dave Hazard =

British karateka

- Born: [Canning Town], England
- Style: Karate
- Teacher(s): Keinosuke Enoeda, Hirokazu Kanazawa
- Rank: 7th dan karate

Other information
- Notable students: Ady Gray (6th dan)

Hazard with Sanna

Dave Hazard (born 1952 in London) is a British 7th Dan Karateka and instructor of Shotokan karate and was one of the few students present at the very beginning of British Karate. He is a former KUGB national champion and British team member. Like many of the early karateka he first trained in judo before starting karate in 1969 at the Blackfriers club in London, where he trained under Keinosuke Enoeda, Hirokazu Kanazawa, Kato and Takahashi.

In 1977 Hazard went to Japan where he studied in Japan Karate Association (JKA) instructor classes under Masatoshi Nakayama.

In 1982 Mick Dewey formed the South of England Karate Union (SEKU). Dewey had been good friends with Hazard for many years and in 1985 invited Hazard to join himself and Mervyn O'Donnell in The South of England Karate Union. At this time Hazard lived in Leyton, East London, and Dewey arranged for him to join the Brighton Karate Club (Dewey had formed the club with Phil Elliott in 1974). Hazard accepted the invitation and moved from London to Brighton where he ran the club for nineteen years, serving as Technical Director and Grading Examiner to SEKU until he left and moved to Nottingham.

Later The 'South of England Karate Union' was renamed The Shotokan of England Karate Union. The Brighton Karate Club is now run by Jess Lavender a 7th Dan.

Hazard later left SEKU and is now the chief instructor of an international association in the form of the Academy of Shotokan Karate, which he founded in 2003, feeling in need of an environment that would allow him personally to evolve his approach to Shotokan Karate-Do. He is assisted within the ASK by senior instructors and karate-ka like Jeff Westgarth, Jess Lavender, Paul Herbert and Juli Pops. He is also the former kata coach for the England national squad, due to the restructuring of the EKGB. He brings to many training courses his expertise in kata and their applications to differing situations.

== Early years ==
David Frederick Hazard was born in Bow, London, England, in 1952. His father's family owned a road haulage company and a public house, while his mother's family worked in the docks. At first the family lived in the upper two rooms of a four-room terraced house in Stepney, with a shared outside toilet. When Dave was seven the family moved Harlow new town in Essex, to a house with two inside toilets, space for everyone and a garden. A few years later when Dave was about thirteen, his parents separated and his mother took the children back to the east end of London to a flat in Leyton. While his mother worked hard to support them, he went to Ruckholt Manor Secondary School, an old and tough place. Refusing to join a gang he was picked on by both sides. After a bad beating by a group of boys one day, his mother took him round to their houses so that he could fight and beat them one at a time, after which he had little more trouble. Not being a model student he had a regular Friday afternoon appointment with the headmaster for a caning. On one occasion the drama teacher challenged Dave to a fight for disrupting his classes and gave him a beating. The following day he took Dave out to the pub for a beer and advised him to use his brains constructively. On another occasion a teacher who had beaten a boy about the head causing temporary blindness was thrown out of a second floor window by older boys, breaking his legs and hips.

== Working ==
Hazard left school aged sixteen and became an apprentice hairdresser in an old fashioned barbers shop where he became skilled at cutting hair. While working in another barbers shop a customer told him about Blackfriars karate club where there were Japanese instructors. In August 1969 he went to watch his first session, with Keinosuke Enoeda teaching assisted by Kato, and decided he wanted to become as good as a yellow belt he watched there. In 1972 Dave passed his first Dan grading. At the following training session he was still wearing a brown belt and Enoeda swapped belts with him, telling him to keep the black belt with Enoeda's name embroidered on it. Not long afterwards he was called up to the England national team. By the time Blackfriars dojo closed, the building being needed for a different use, Hazard had risen from beginner to run the club. As a professional instructor Hazard taught a girl called Katy at Goldsmiths College karate club who was known as "Ee-ee" because of her squeaky kiai. Kate Bush was later seen on television singing her high pitched hit song "Wuthering Heights" with dance moves that Hazard said appeared to come from karate. As well as also working as a doorman Hazard worked in a number of jobs including auto-electrics with his uncle and steel fixing, putting concrete reinforcing bars in place.

== Training in Japan ==
In 1977 Hazard travelled to Japan to train with the top masters, where he was invited to train in the JKA Instructors Class. On leaving London he was surprised to find Tomita waiting at the airport to see him off. He had met Tomita when he had first come to England and now Tomita was repaying him. Training at the JKA headquarters in Ebisu, Tokyo he was recommended by Enoeda to study the technique of Mikio Yahara who was of similar build. The two of them got on well and trained hard against each other.

== Joining SEKU ==
In April 1982 twenty clubs in the south of England, led by Mick Dewey of Portsmouth club decided to leave the KUGB and formed a new association, The South of England Karate Union. When clubs from northern England later joined this was changed to The Shotokan of England Karate Union. In 1985, with SEKU growing, Dewey asked his old friend Hazard to join the organisation as Technical Director. To be a SEKU grading examiner Hazard needed to have his own club, so he moved from London to Brighton where he took over the running of Brighton Karate Club, building it into an elite dojo training black and brown belts almost exclusively. At SEKU Hazard started an instructors' class on the lines of that he had trained in Japan, to improve quality and uniformity of teaching.

== Founding the Academy of Shotokan Karate ==
In 2003, after nineteen years with SEKU (technical director since 1985), Hazard left to set up his own federation the Academy of Shotokan Karate (ASK). ASK is an international organisation founded to promote excellence in Shotokan karate as a martial art rather than as a sport.

Emphasis is placed on study of the kata and their applications in self-defence. This direction was approved by the late Keinosuke Enoeda, whose principles are continued by the federation. The founding clubs were mostly former members of SEKU and were joined by clubs from Ireland and Canada.

The association's competitions are held biennially in Nottingham, England. The first competition was attended by Enoeda's widow, who was presented with a photograph of her husband from the 1960s which she had not seen before. At the 2006 Shobu Ippon international competition at Guildford Spectrum a five-man ASK kumite team, all from Kihaku Dojo, won the inter federation team fight, and the federation has placed high in the Shobu-ippon medal table in subsequent years.

The Grading Examiner and Senior Instructor for the South of England is Jess Lavender who took over Hazard's Brighton Dojo, after Hazard relocated to Nottingham.

== Autobiography ==
In 2007, John Blake Publishing Ltd published Hazard's autobiography, Born Fighter.
