= Caroline Hazard =

American educator

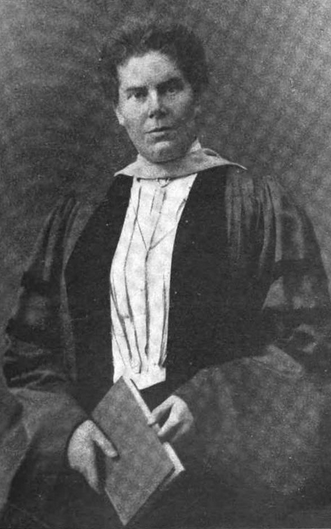
- Caroline Hazard, from a 1904 publication
- Born: June 10, 1856; Peace Dale, Rhode Island, US
- Died: March 19, 1945 (aged 88); Santa Barbara, California, US
- Resting place: Oak Dell Cemetery
- Occupations: Educator, philanthropist, author

Caroline Hazard (June 10, 1856 – March 19, 1945) was an American educator, philanthropist, and author. She served as the fifth president of Wellesley College, from 1899 to 1910.

== Early life ==
Caroline Hazard was born in Peace Dale, Rhode Island in 1856. She was of the Hazard Family; her father was industrialist Rowland Hazard II (1829–1898) and her mother was Margaret A. Hazard, née Rood. She was educated at the Mary A. Shaw School in Providence and received private tutoring at Brown University and in Europe. She conducted welfare programs in Peace Dale, and wrote on a variety of topics, including biography, poetry, and Rhode Island history. She was the founder of the Peace Dale Museum of Art and Culture in 1892.

== President of Wellesley College ==
Hazard succeeded Julia J. Irvine as president of Wellesley College on March 8, 1899. In her inaugural address, she spoke about the changing role of women in society, the necessity of balancing emotion and intellect, and her new responsibilities.

As president, Hazard took an active role in the construction of new buildings. She solicited suggestions from architect Frederick Law Olmsted on the design of residence halls. She oversaw the construction of the Observatory, Observatory House, Hazard Quadrangle, and Library, and personally contributed funds for some of these projects. These buildings, as well as Hazard's house in Peace Dale, were marked with a scallop shell, a personal symbol she adopted in reference to a poem by Sir Walter Raleigh.

Through Hazard's leadership, fundraising efforts, and personal donations, the college's enrollment doubled, academic departments were expanded, and faculty salaries were increased.

== Later life and legacy ==
Caroline Hazard continued to act as a trustee of Wellesley College from her retirement in 1910 until 1927. She maintained a residence in Santa Barbara, California and made frequent visits there. After her brother Rowland's death in 1918, Hazard took his place on the board of the Santa Barbara Museum of Natural History, and donated land to expand its buildings. She also led an initiative to purchase land which later became part of Mission Park.

She was awarded honorary Doctor of Letters degrees from numerous institutions, including Wellesley, Mills College, Brown University, Tufts University, and Rhode Island State College.

Hazard died in Santa Barbara on March 19, 1945, and was buried in Oak Dell Cemetery, South Kingstown, Rhode Island.

She was inducted into the Rhode Island Heritage Hall of Fame in 2010.
