= HMS Hazard (1749) =

Sloop of the Royal Navy

History

Great Britain
- Name: HMS Hazard
- Ordered: 12 July 1749
- Builder: Peirson Lock (d.1755), Portsmouth Dockyard
- Laid down: 25 July 1749
- Launched: 3 October 1749
- Fate: Sold 11 February 1783

General characteristics
- Tons burthen: 1407/94, or (bm)
- Length: Overall:76 ft 3 in (23.2 m); Keel:62 ft 8 in (19.1 m)
- Beam: 20 ft 6 in (6.2 m)
- Depth of hold: 9 ft 4 in (2.8 m)
- Sail plan: Brig
- Complement: 50
- Armament: 8 × 3-pounder guns + 8 × ½-pounder swivel guns

Great Britain
- Name: Joseph
- Owner: 1783:J.Dowson; 1793:Guillaume
- Acquired: 1783 by purchase
- Fate: Last listed 1805

General characteristics
- Tons burthen: 130, or 150 (bm)
- Sail plan: Brig

HMS Hazard was launched in 1749 For the Royal Navy as brig-rigged sloop. She had a 30-plus year career with the navy, during which she captured several small French privateers. At the end of the American War of Independence, the navy sold her and she became the merchantman Joseph. After almost a decade as a merchantman trading with Spain, a new owner made a whaler of her. She made seven whaling voyages and was no longer listed after 1804, two years after her return from her last whaling voyage.

== Royal Navy ==
Commander Thomas Hanbury took command of Hazard on 11 October 1749 and commissioned her for the Channel. On 22 February 1751 she was ordered to Portsmouth to have her lower masts shortened by 5 ft (1.5 m). Between 1751 and 1753 she served in the Irish Sea. On 31 January 1753 she was paid off. On 5 March 1753 Commander Hanbury was accused of several 'Iregularites' and was dismissed, not to be employed until enquired at by court martial.

Commander Thomas Graves took command of Hazard on 12 March 1754. When hostilities with France increased in 1755, Hazard was among the vessels ordered to Brest to look for the French grand fleet under Admiral Macnamara. Graves had the good fortune to encounter the fleet as it was returning to Brest. He twice sailed across their line, counting the vessels. He was able to transmit the valuable information to Lord Anson, who promoted Graves to post captain on 8 July 1755.

On 10 July 1755 Commander James Hackman replaced Graves in command of Hazard. On 1 September 1756 Hazard captured the privateer snow Subtile off Lowestoff. Subtile was armed with 12 guns and had a crew of 86 men under the command of Jean Baptiste Tate. During the six-hour engagement Subtile twice tried to board Hazard, but was repulsed. After she struck off Winterton her crew were taken ashore the next day and lodged in the local jail. Fourteen managed to tunnel out, but one man got stuck and his cries for help alerted the guards who succeeded in recapturing four men. The navy took Subtile into service as HMS Hazard's Prize, but sold the 99-ton sloop in 1759.

On 4 February 1757 Hazard captured the privateer Saint Thomas. St Thomas, of Dieppe, was armed with six guns and six swivel guns. Hazard brought her into Portsmouth. On 3 May 1758 Hackman paid off Hazard.

Samuel Granston Goodall was promoted to Commander on 2 June 1760 and given command of Hazard. On 7 August he sent in his boats and capture the French privateer Duc d'Ayen while she was at anchor off Egersund, Norway. Duc d'Ayen was a dogger armed with seven 4-pounders and had a crew of 65 men. Hazard brought her into Shields. Her capture was alleged to have been in violation of Denmark's neutrality, and Goodall became involved in a lengthy correspondence on the subject.

Goodall commanded Hazard in the convoy that brought Princess Charlotte of Mecklenburg-Strelitz to England in August 1761 for her wedding to King George III. Then Goodall was sent out to the West Indies where on 3 (or 13) January 1762 he was promoted to the rank of post captain.

Commander The Hon. Henry St John assumed command on 28 January 1762. On 15 August Hazard captured the French privateer cutter Savage (or Sauvage). She was armed with four swivel guns and had a crew of 15 men. She was four days out of Dunkirk and had captured the sloop Robert, of Ipswich, John Hunt, master. Hazard recaptured Robert too. Savage proved so leaky that St John burnt her.

Hazard shared the head money for the destruction of Savage with the sloop HMS Nautilus and the armed cutters Lyon and Lurcher. The same four vessels also shared the prize money for the hull and head money for San Souci.

Commander St John left Hazard on 31 August. His replacement was Commander Dennis Every. Every paid Hazard on 22 December 1762.

The navy had Hazard surveyed on 25 February 1763. Commander William Webster took command on 19 May and recommissioned her. On 24 October 1766 Commander Thomas Pemble replaced Webster. He commanded until 26 October 1769, when Commander James Orrok replaced him. He recommissioned her in May 1770. In 1771 she served on the east coast of Scotland. On 28 October 1772 Commander John Ford replaced Orrok. On 23 June 1773 Hazard participated in the Spithead Review. On 25 June King George directed that the commanders of Hazard, Speedwell, and Wasp be promoted to captain. However, Commander Ford continued to command Hazard as a commander until 24 November 1775, during which time she continued to serve on Scotland's east coast.

Commander James Orrok returned to Hazard as a replacement for Ford. On 20 November 1777 Commander Alexander Agnew replace Orrock, and on 1 February 1779 Commander George Ann Pluteney replaced Agnew.

Commander Edward Pellew was Hazard's last commander. He took command on 1 July 1780.

Hazard was paid off on 24 January 1781. The "Principal Officers and Commissioners of His Majesty's Navy" offered the sloop Hazard, of 140 tons, for sale on 11 February 1783 at Sheerness. She sold on that day for £200.

== Joseph: Merchantman ==
Joseph first appeared in Lloyd's Register in 1783. Her master was John Ladd, her owner Dowson, and her trade London–Seville. The entry noted that she was the former HMS Hazard, sloop of war, and that in 1783 she had been raised and had undergone a thorough repair. She was reported to have been well at Malaga on 29 March 1794 while on her way from Gallipoli, Apulia, to Rotterdam.

Year	Master	Owner	Trade	Notes
1786	J. Cheap	J. Dowson	London–Cadiz	
1789	J. Cheap	J. Dowson	London–Cadiz	lengthened and thorough repair 1783; small repairs 1790
1792	Sandland	J. Dowson	London–Cadiz	lengthened and thorough repair 1783; small repairs 1790

== Joseph: Whaler ==
Between 1793 and 1802 Joseph made seven whaling voyages.

1st whaling voyage (1793): One source states that her master was Captain Macey. However, Lloyd's Register for 1794 (published in 1793), showed her with W. Page, master, J. Dowson, owner, and port of Bristol. The next year it still gave her master as Page, but her owner as Guillaume and her trade as London–Southern Fishery. She had also undergone a good repair in 1794.

2nd whaling voyage (1794–1795): Captain W. Scott sailed from London on 19 February 1794. Joseph returned on 2 March 1795 with 99 tuns of whale oil and 90 cwt of whale bone.

3rd whaling voyage (1795–1796): Captain Scott sailed from London in 1796. Joseph returned on 28 July 1796 with 70 tuns of whale oil and 40 cwt of whale bone.

4th whaling voyage (1797–1798): Captain Magnus Smith sailed in 1797, bound for South Georgia. Joseph returned on 11 January 1798.

5th whaling voyage (1798–1799): Captain John Humphries (or John Humphrey), sailed on 13 March 1798. Joseph returned on 4 June 1799.

6th whaling voyage (1799–1800): Captain Ellis, or John Humphrey, sailed from London in 1799. As Joseph was returning home, the French privateer Minerve captured her. On 3 August 1800, HMS Fisgard captured the French privateer Gironde. Earlier, she had also recaptured some other French prizes, including Joseph and Young William, another returning whaler. Lloyd's List reported on 19 August 1800 that Joseph, Humphries, master, had come into Plymouth after her recapture by Fisgard. Joseph arrived back at London on 26 September.

7th whaling voyage (1801–1802): Captain John Humphreys sailed from London on 31 March 1801. Joseph returned on 24 June 1802.

== Fate ==
Joseph was no longer listed in the registers after 1804.
