= Joseph Hazard =

American judge

Joseph Hazard (May 21, 1728 – April 31, 1790) was a justice of the Rhode Island Supreme Court from May 1786 to May 1787, succeeding Peter Phillips in the office.

Hazard's name first appears in the Colonial records in 1756, as Deputy from South Kingstown, Rhode Island. In the same year he was appointed Lieutenant-Colonel of militia for Kings County. From 1761 until 1777, he "was Assistant, with scarcely an interval". In 1770, he and Stephen Hopkins formed a committee to examine a complaint of the Collector and Comptroller of the Port of Newport. In 1786 and 1787 he was Associate Judge of the Supreme Court.

Rhode Island historian Wilkins Updike said of Hazard:

Colonel Joseph Hazard inherited all the lofty firmness, the unwavering perseverance, and sterling mind of his mother. He was elected to many important offices by the people, and sustained them with honor. Although a determined partisan, he never permitted his political attachments to sway from the principles of right. His motto was 'to do right, and let consequences take care of themselves'.

Hazard was on the court when the Rhode Island General Assembly enacted the "Paper Money Laws" of 1786, and was one of the paper-money party. However, when the question of the constitutionality of these laws came before the court in the case of Trevett v. Weeden, the court declared the Paper-Money Tender Laws unconstitutional and void. The General Assembly ordered the Court to be arraigned before them for a contempt of legislative power, and they were required to give their respective reasons for overthrowing the laws of the Legislature that had created them. When called on to explain his decisions, Hazard rose and said:

It gives me pain, that the conduct of the Court seems to have met with the displeasure of the Administration; but their obligations were of too sacred a nature for them to aim at pleasing, but in the line of their duty. It is well known that my sentiments have fully accorded with the general system of the Legislature in emitting the paper-money currency. But I never did, and never will depart from the character of an honest man, to support any measures however agreeable in themselves. If there could have been any prepossession in my mind, it must have been in favor of the act of the General Assembly, but it is not possible to resist the force of conviction. The opinion I gave on the trial was dictated by energy of truth. I thought it right. I still think so. But be it as it may, we derived our understanding from God, and to him alone are we accountable for our judgment.

Updike described this as "an instance where the heroic firmness of a few men saved the reputation of a State."

Joseph Hazard married Hannah Nichols, daughter of Deputy-Governor Jonathan Nichols, on September 28, 1760. He died at the age of 61.

Political offices
Preceded by Peter Phillips	Justice of the Rhode Island Supreme Court; 1786–1787	Succeeded by William West
