= Solvay Process Company =

American chemical manufacturer

- Type: Chemical manufacturing
- Industry: Chemicals
- Founded: 1880
- Founder: William B. Cogswell
- Defunct: 1985
- Fate: Acquired by Allied Chemical and Dye Corporation in 1920; Closed by AlliedSignal in 1985
- Headquarters: Solvay, Onondaga County, New York, United States
- Area served: United States
- Key people: William B. Cogswell; Rowland Hazard II; Ernest Solvay; Alfred Solvay; Louis Semet; William H. Nichols; Eugene Meyer; Orlando Weber
- Products: Soda ash
- Number of employees: 1,400 (1985)
- Parent: Allied Chemical and Dye Corporation (1920–1985)

The Solvay Process Company was an American chemical manufacturer that specialized in the manufacture of soda ash. A major employer in Central New York, the company was key in the origin of the village of Solvay, New York, where it was headquartered.

== History ==
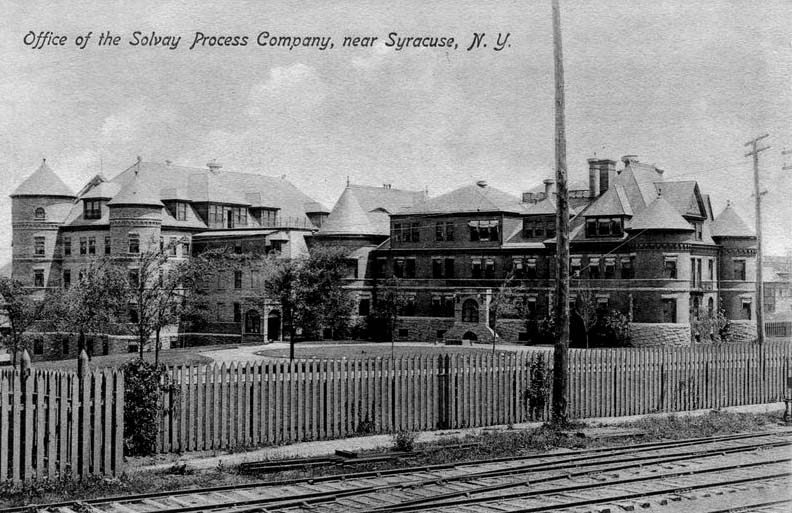
Solvay Process Company office building around 1889

The Solvay Process Company was a joint venture between Belgian chemists Ernest and Alfred Solvay, who owned the patent rights to the Solvay process, and Americans William B. Cogswell and Rowland Hazard II. Cogswell, a former resident of Syracuse, was an engineer who was familiar with the natural resources of Central New York that would be available for use in process. Knowing that American industry was importing soda ash from Europe, Cogswell envisioned utilizing the process in America.

After several refusals, Cogswell eventually secured American rights to the Solvay process. He obtained capital to build a production facility from Rowland Hazard II, scion of the Hazard family. Rowland Hazard was the major American investor in the company and its first president. His son, Frederick Rowland Hazard, was an initial officer and subsequently became president. William B. Cogswell served as vice-president. Frederick's brother Rowland G. Hazard II soon followed Cogswell as vice-president. The Solvay brothers themselves had a one-third interest in the company.

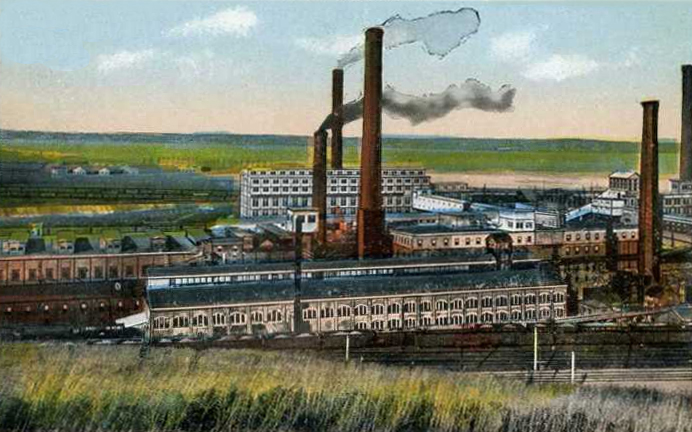
Solvay Process Company plant around 1900

Wells in Tully provided salt brine, pumped by pipeline to Solvay. An elevated conveyor, with buckets suspended from a cable loop, passed in a tunnel through a hill to deliver stone from company quarries at Split Rock in Onondaga, about four miles to the south.

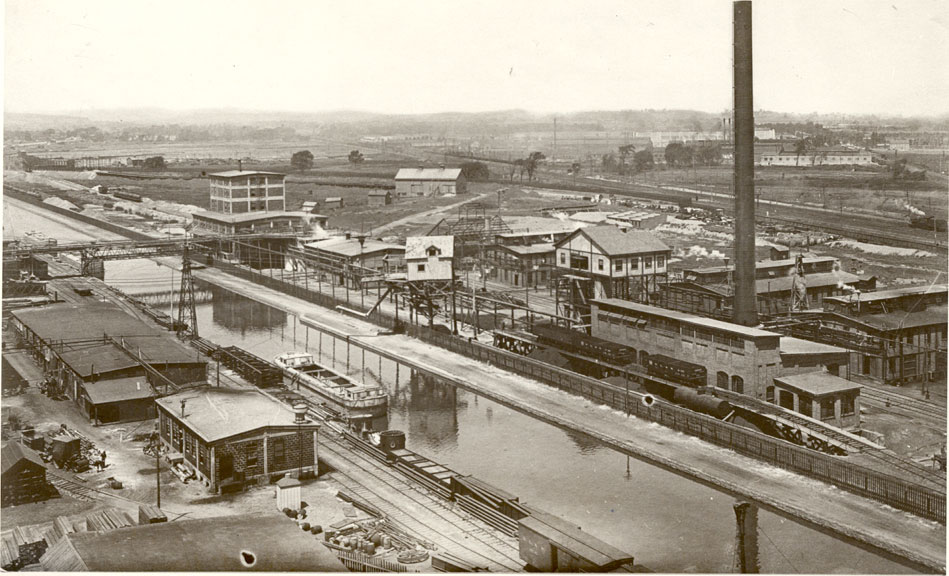
Solvay Process Plant in Solvay, New York. The Erie Canal passed through this plant until about 1917.

The Erie Canal passed through the Solvay Process plant until 1917, as did Onondaga Lake, connected to the New York State canal system. The main line of the New York Central Railroad also passed through company property.

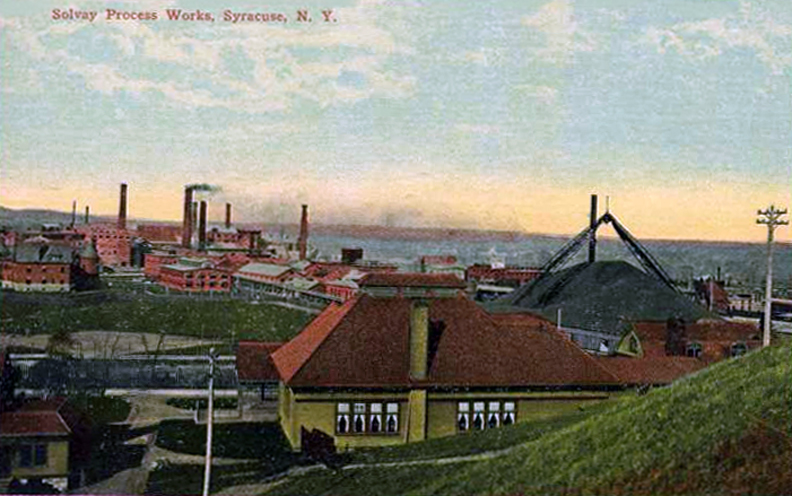
Solvay Process Company plant around 1900

The town of Solvay grew around the Solvay Process plant. The Church and Dwight Company, producer of Arm & Hammer baking soda, which used material from the Solvay process, built a production facility nearby.

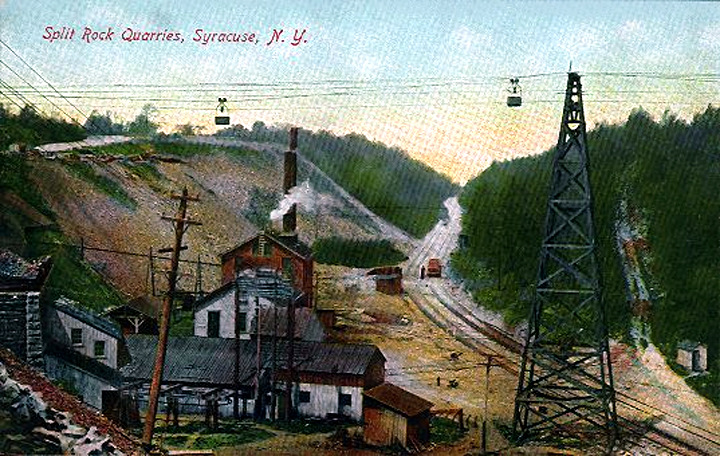
Solvay Cable Road in 1910

The Hazard family invested in an affiliated business, the Semet-Solvay Company, formed in 1895. Louis Semet, a relative of the Solvays, had developed with the brothers a coke oven designed to recover valuable materials formerly wasted in the coking process. In 1892 the Solvay Process Company built the first of these ovens in America, forming the Semet-Solvay Company in 1895 to build and operate these ovens. Coke plants were located in Ashland, Kentucky, Buffalo, New York, Milwaukee, Wisconsin, Detroit, Michigan, and Ironton, Ohio. Semet-Solvay also operated its own coal mines in West Virginia, providing much of its coal supply.

In 1889, Solvay came to southwest Detroit area known as Delray. At the time it improved streets and the neighborhood, as it extracted underground salts from beneath the Detroit River. By 1969, Solvay was gone.

In 1915, during World War I, Split Rock became the site of a munitions factory operated by the Semet-Solvay Company. The plant employed about 2500 people when it exploded on July 2, 1918, killing at least 50. The explosion allegedly occurred after a mixing motor in the main TNT building overheated. The fire rapidly spread through the wooden structure of the main factory. Firefighting efforts were hampered by a loss of water pressure, and the factory eventually exploded. The blast leveled the structure.

=== Absorption by Allied Chemical ===
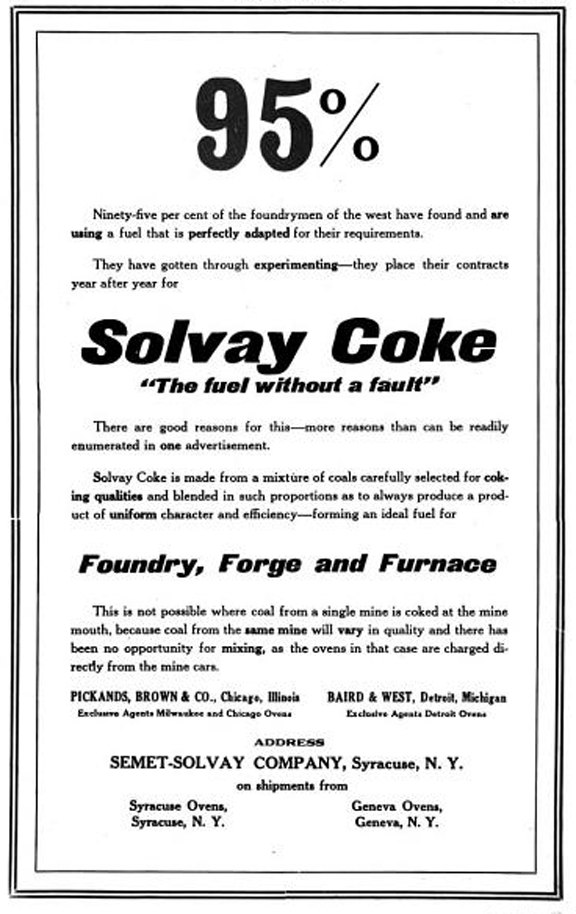
Semet-Solvay Company advertisement, May 1, 1913

Both the Solvay Process Company and the Semet-Solvay Company were absorbed by the Allied Chemical and Dye Corporation in 1920, a merger promoted by chemist William Henry Nichols and financier Eugene Meyer. Nichols owned several chemical companies and was a founding member of the American Chemical Society in 1876, serving twice as its president. Meyer was publisher of The Washington Post. Nichols, having observed American dependence on German chemical production, hence vulnerability during World War I, envisioned consolidation and recapitalization of the American chemical industry. Formed in 1920 and based in New York City, the Allied Chemical and Dye Corporation combined five chemical companies, including Solvay Process and Semet-Solvay. When proposed, the promoters assured the companies that each would retain autonomy of operations.

Meyer persuaded Orlando Weber to take charge of Allied Chemical. Under Weber's tenure between 1920 and 1935, Allied Chemical was successful financially, but his control reversed the previously agreed-upon policy about company autonomy. The Hazard family attempted to gain a controlling interest by quietly acquiring large amounts of stock in Allied Chemical. They failed to return operations of the plant to local control or rehire personnel terminated by the new corporation, contrary to their agreement.

=== 1943 waste bed flood ===
Large marshlands around the lake provided disposal for sludge from the process, leaving extensive "waste beds". These have contributed to the pollution of the Onondaga Lake.

On Thanksgiving Day in 1943, 40,000 tons of industrial waste consisting of calcium carbonate and magnesia flooded the hamlet of Lakeland, New York. The industrial waste originated from the Solvay Process plant, having broken through a retaining wall at waste bed number 7.

Two square miles were covered by the waste, which reached as much as eight feet deep in some places. The Post-Standard reported in 1993 that "every tree, shrub or blade of grass within a square mile was dead". There were no reported fatalities, but there were a few injured, such as Fred Hulbert, assistant chief of the auxiliary military police at Solvay Process, who was treated for acid burns and two frozen toes after rescuing numerous stranded Lakeland residents using a rowboat. Fifty-five residents were left homeless as a result of the flood.

The waste was initially intended to be removed by dumping truckloads of cinders into the waste until it solidified enough to be shoveled out, but that plan was scrapped in favor of dissolving the waste using water and eventually pumping it into Ninemile Creek, which flows into Onondaga Lake. The cleanup process took two months to complete. The houses affected by the flood, now worthless, were purchased by Solvay Process and demolished.

An investigation launched by Solvay Process into the incident reported that the dykes at the plant were built of old Solvay waste, not dirt, and that they were built too rapidly. The investigation also stated that the demand for production during World War II was too great and help was too limited. After the incident, Solvay Process moved their waste beds away from the shoreline of Onondaga Lake.

=== Decline and closure ===
Solvay Chemical continued soda ash production through the 20th century. By 1980, the demand for soda ash plummeted. By 1985, the company had lost $55 million over the previous three years, forcing Allied Chemical (AlliedSignal at the time) to close and demolish the plant, dismissing 1,400 employees. Several significant buildings, such as the company's local headquarters, were not demolished and were sold instead. After the plant closed down in 1986, the main office building for the Solvay Process Company, located on Milton Avenue in Solvay, NY, was torn down in July of 2000. A historic marker was built at the original site of the company building on Milton Avenue near Lamont Ave.

== Sources ==
- Solvay Process Company Records
- AlliedSignal History
- "Evamaria Hardin - Faculty Papers". Archived from the original on September 1, 2006. Hardin's papers include a "Solvay Process History".
- Company Archives
- Building blueprints, Solvay Library
