= Peace Dale, Rhode Island =

Village in South Kingstown, Rhode Island, US

- Peace Dale Historic District
- U.S. National Register of Historic Places
- U.S. Historic district
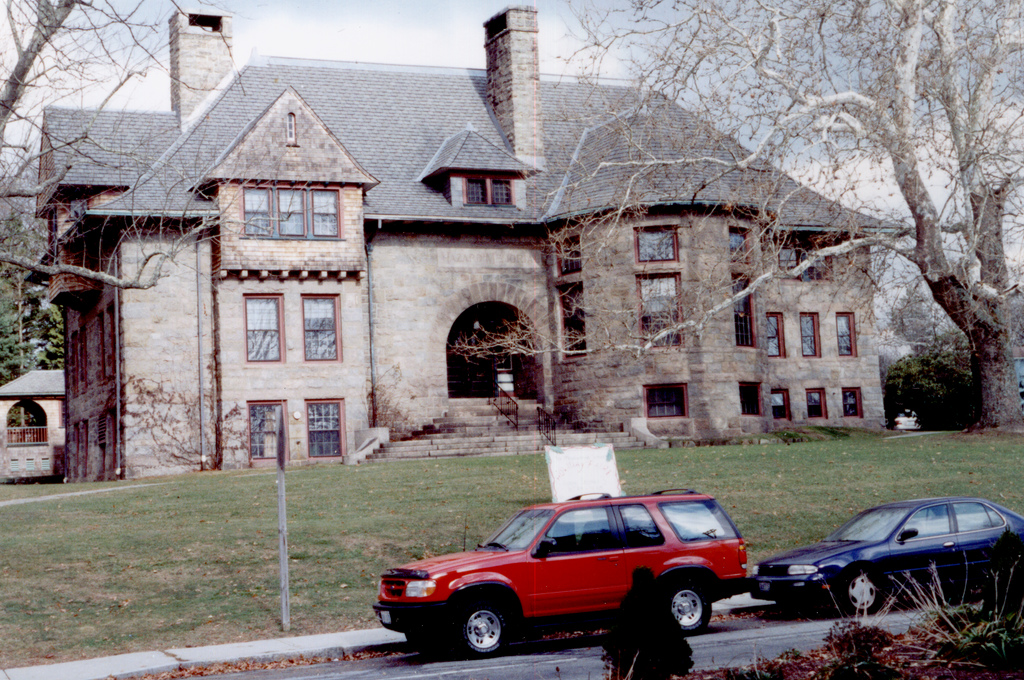
- Peace Dale Library

- Location within Rhode Island Location within the United States
- Location: South Kingstown, Rhode Island
- Coordinates: 41.4514°N 71.4961°W
- Architect: Frank W. Angell; Et al.
- Architectural style: Colonial Revival, Late Victorian, Romanesque
- NRHP reference No.: 87000493
- Added to NRHP: October 30, 1987

Peace Dale (also spelled Peacedale) is a village in the town of South Kingstown, Rhode Island, United States. Together with the village of Wakefield, it is treated by the U.S. Census as a component of the census-designated place identified as Wakefield-Peacedale.

The Peace Dale Historic District was listed on the National Register of Historic Places as a historic district in 1987. The historic district is roughly bounded by Kersey Rd., Oakwoods Dr., Kingstown Rd., School, Church and Railroad Sts., and contains the historic core of the village.

== History ==
Peace Dale was established as a village in 1793 by South Kingstown industrialist Rowland Hazard who named the village in honor of his wife, Mary Peace Hazard. Around 1804, Hazard reputedly pioneered the use of carding machines to process wool in Rhode Island. In 1814, Hazard was also one of the first American manufacturers to employ narrow-width power looms, and also was the first woolen manufacturer to combine all his manufacturing processes under one roof, from wool carding through spinning, weaving, and dyeing.

In 1819 Rowland Hazard's sons Isaac P. Hazard and Rowland G. Hazard assumed management responsibility for the Peace Dale Manufacturing Company. A third brother, Joseph P. Hazard, joined them as a partner in 1828, and the business took the name "R.G. Hazard & Co."

Around 1820 the senior Rowland Hazard renamed the nearby industrial village to Wakefield after the town and family of the same name in England, who were friends of his. Prior to this, the village had been called McCoon's Mill for the snuff mill that by the 1820s had been converted to manufacturing woolen textiles.

After an 1845 fire destroyed one of the mill buildings, the brothers built new facilities, including expanded hydropower systems and a fireproof stone factory. In 1848 the partnership incorporated, becoming the Peace Dale Manufacturing Company, with Isaac P. Hazard as president and Rowland G. Hazard as secretary/treasurer. In 1849 the business started a transition into making woolen shawls and other high-quality woolens instead of cheaper fabrics.

Later in the 19th century, the sons of Rowland G. Hazard, John N. and Rowland Hazard II (1829–1898), assumed responsibility for operating the Peace Dale Mills. In 1856 Rowland Hazard II, an amateur architect, designed several new buildings in Peace Dale, including a new stone weaving mill and a stone building located across from the mills that housed offices, a store, the village post office, and a public hall. Over the next several decades he influenced the construction and design of numerous additional buildings, accounting for more than half of the built environment of modern Peace Dale. Rowland Hazard II also was an initial investor in the Solvay Process Company, with works at Solvay, New York, and served as the company's first president.

Peace Dale's mills operated for woolen manufacturing until 1948, when the manufacturing machinery was removed.

The Hazard family also owned and operated the Narragansett Pier Railroad which connected their textile mills in Peace Dale and Wakefield to the New York, Providence and Boston Railroad at Kingston Station (Rhode Island) and to shipping at South Pier in the village of Narragansett Pier.

=== Contributing properties ===
Buildings in Peace Dale that are identified as contributing properties in the historic district include:

- Peace Dale Congregational Church, a Gothic Revival church built in 1870–72 on Columbia St.
- Peace Dale Manufacturing Company Barn, a secondary structure built in 1866, on Green St.
- Peace Dale Grammar School, a Colonial Revival school built in 1923, on Kersey Rd.
- Former Peace Dale Grammar School, built in 1902 at 8 Kersey Rd., later used for storage.
- Peace Dale Manufacturing Co. Water Power Sys., an energy facility built in the 1850s on Kingstown Rd.
- Hazard Memorial/Peace Dale Library, a Romanesque former auditorium, built in 1890–91 on Kingstown Rd.
- Peace Dale Office Building, built circa 1856 at 604 Kingstown Rd.
- General Isaac Peace Rodman House at 1789 Kingstown Rd.
- Peace Dale Woolen Mill, a Greek Revival factory built in 1847 at Kingstown Rd. and Columbia St.
- Peace Dale Railroad Station (former), built in 1875–76 on Railroad St.
- Peace Dale Pump House, a former water mill that was a restaurant and is now occupied by Shady Lea Guitars, a guitar oriented shop, studio, and performance venue located on Kingstown Rd.

=== Gallery ===
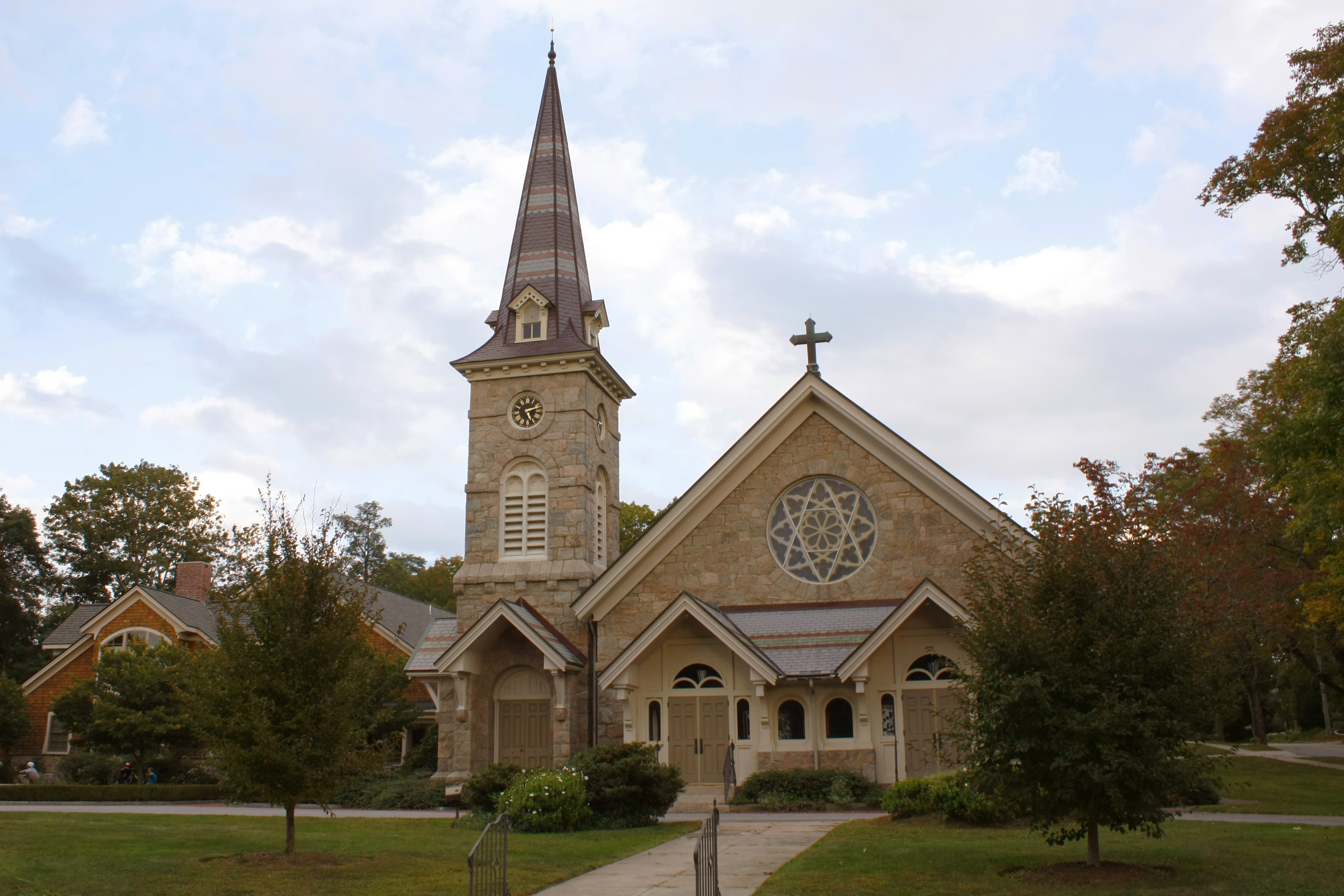
Peace Dale Congregational Church

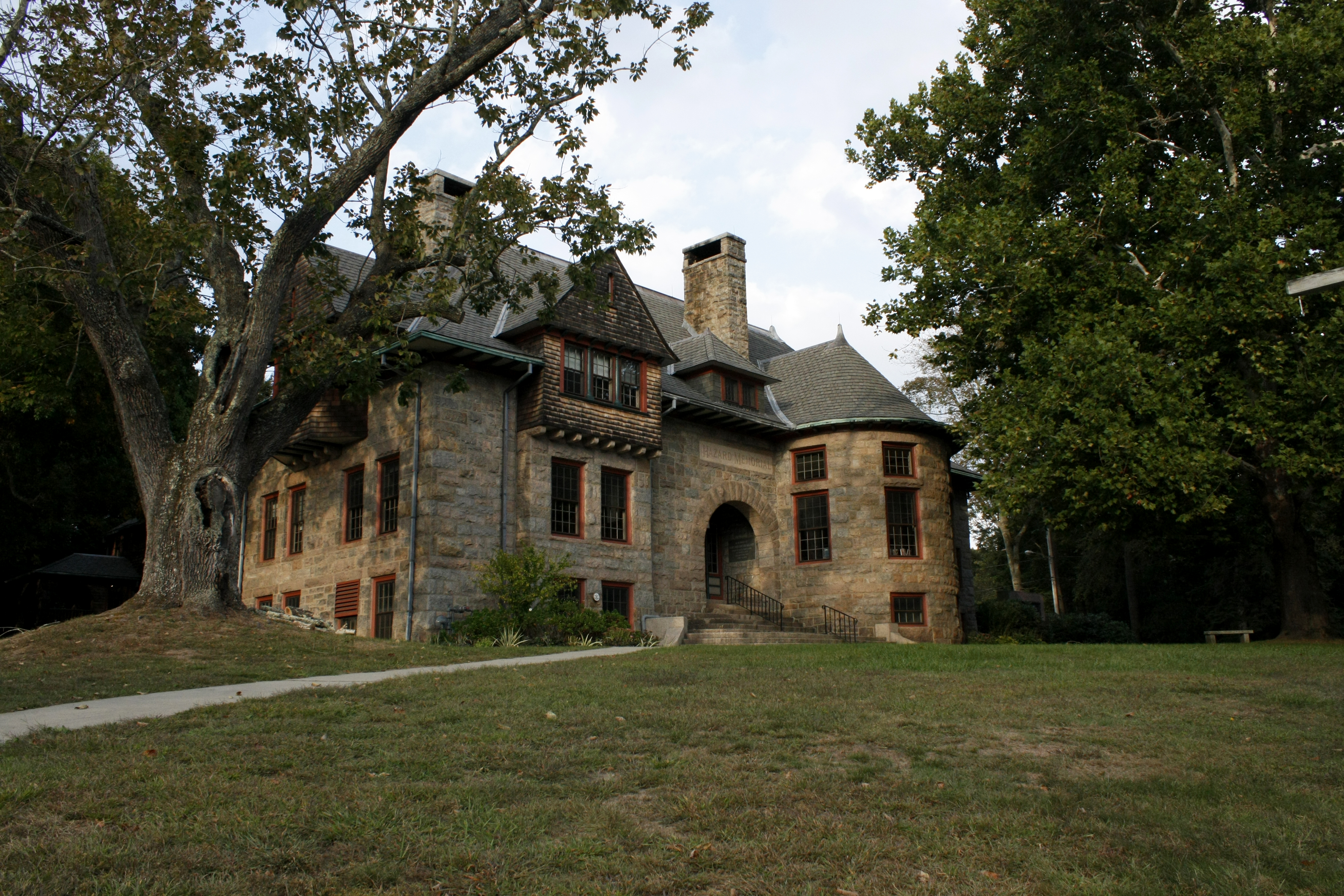
Hazard Memorial Peace Dale Library

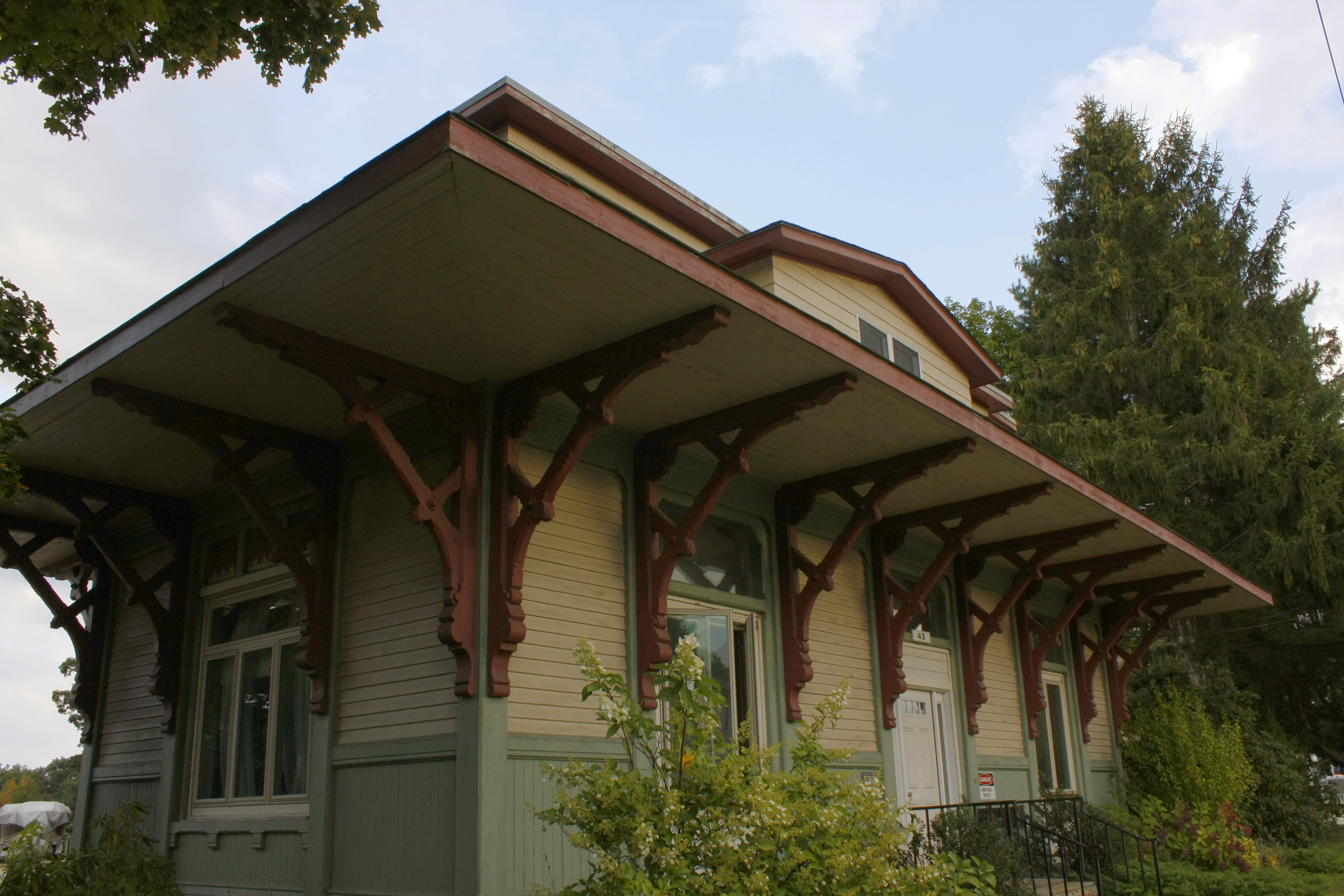
Peace Dale Railroad Station (former)

== See also ==
- National Register of Historic Places listings in Washington County, Rhode Island
