= Stan Schmidt =

South African karateka and actor (1936–2019)

- Born: 6 October 1936; South Africa
- Died: 7 October 2019 (aged 83); Melbourne, Australia
- Style: Judo, Shotokan Karate
- Teachers: Keinosuke Enoeda, Masatoshi Nakayama, Tetsuhiko Asai; Taiji Kase
- Rank: 8th dan karate (JKA)

Other information
- Spouse: Jane
- Children: 4
- Notable relatives: Dean Geyer (grandson)

Stan Schmidt was a South African master of Shotokan karate. Along with others, such as Norman Robinson, he was an early practitioner of Shotokan karate in South Africa and his establishment of the South African branch of the Japan Karate Association (JKA) in 1965 after training in Japan, along with his subsequent promotion of the art in South Africa, earned him the appellation of 'The Father of South African Karate'. In 1963, he was one of the first westerners to be invited into the JKA's famous Instructor Class in the Tokyo Honbu dojo and he was later one of four non-Japanese karateka to sit on the JKA's international Shihankai. He was also the first non-Japanese karateka to attain 7th dan from the JKA and also the first to attain 8th dan. Today, he is the highest ranking non-Japanese karate master of that organization. He is also known for his acting roles in several martial arts films of the 1970s and 1980s.

== Early life ==
Schmidt was born on 6 October 1936 in Kokstad, Transkei, South Africa. He was educated at King Edward VII High School and then studied at the University of South Africa where he obtained a master's degree in Communications. His route into martial arts was initially through judo in which he competed nationally and later karate.

== Karate ==
Stan Schmidt is credited with formally introducing karate to South Africa in the 1950s along with other men such as Len Barnes, Richard Salmon, James Rousseau, Des Botes, and Norman Robinson. Schmidt had been introduced to the concept of karate by his Judo instructor who gave him a karate book authored by Hidetaka Nishiyama entitled ‘Karate - The Art of Empty Hand Fighting’, whilst Schmidt was convalescing from a broken ankle. As with the other pioneers of South African karate, it was from textbooks such as this that Schmidt gained his knowledge of karate. He then began training himself at his judo dojo and there, he encouraged other judoka to join him, including Ken Wittstock, Norman Robinson and Eddie Dorey.

Of those that were studying Shotokan, Schmidt was the first to realize the ambition of travelling to Japan for further training when, along with his wife Judy, he left for Tokyo in 1963 to train with the JKA. Whilst in Japan Schmidt fought the then All-Japan Grand Champion Hiroshi Shirai who had won both kata and kumite in 1962. This was despite Schmidt's then much lower rank of 7th Kyu. After this fight, the senior instructor Keinosuke Enoeda coached Schmidt privately and a few months later, before returning to South Africa from this first trip to Japan, Schmidt was graded to 3rd Kyu brown belt by Masatoshi Nakayama. Nakayama also previously invited Schmidt to train with the Instructors Class, which Schmidt dubbed 'The Hornet's Nest' due to the arduous nature of the training therein.

Schmidt's visit to Japan helped forge relations with the JKA such that, in 1964, Taiji Kase visited South Africa. The next year, in 1965, Schmidt and Robinson brought four Japanese instructors to South Africa: the returning Taiji Kase; Keinosuke Enoeda; Hirokazu Kanazawa; and Hiroshi Shirai. These instructors stayed for six months from April to October 1965. Enoeda, stayed at Schmidt's house and trained him. Schmidt achieved his Shodan ('black belt') and then his Nidan (second dan) under Kase. He also went on to become the first South African karate kumite champion. Enoeda then left South Africa for the United Kingdom.

In 1970, Schmidt was one of three South Africans (the others being Norman Robinson and Ronnie Renshaw) to be invited by Japan to participate in the inaugural Karate World Championships at which they competed for Japan.

In the late 1980s, when Schmidt was training for his 7th Dan in Japan he spent time under the teaching of Tetsuhiko Asai. He went on to become the first non-Japanese karateka to attain the level of 7th Dan from the Japan Karate Association and has remained as the highest graded westerner in that organisation latterly being awarded his 8th dan on 14 February 2015.

Schmidt was the subject of an episode of SABC's People of the South, a talk show hosted by Dali Tambo that focused on celebrating the lives of different personalities from southern Africa to promote a sense of national identity and pride by reflecting on their achievements and acclamations. The episode featuring Schmidt was during the program's initial run from 1994–2002.

Schmidt was featured numerous times in issues of "Shotokan Karate", including being featured twice on the cover. An article about him also mentions he is also an author, writing "books on his personal experiences and the philosophy of karate". In 1988 Schmidt wrote some columns for "Fighting Arts International" magazine (at least in issues 48, 54, and 55). He also had a featured article in the September 2001 issue of "Masters of Karate".

== Retirement ==
After retiring, Stan Schmidt moved to Melbourne, Australia. He died in Melbourne on 7 October 2019, aged 83.

== Film career ==
Stan Schmidt appeared in a number of films as a Martial Artist including in 1976, Karate Killer and in the 1981 box office success Kill and Kill Again. Schmidt and Norman Robinson choreographed the karate fight scenes in Kill and Kill Again and featured in them as the main protagonist's companions, 'The Fly' and 'Gypsy Billy' respectively, with one commentator citing these karate action scenes as the film's only commendation.

== See also ==
- List of Shotokan organizations
- Karin Prinsloo (karateka)
