= Norman Robinson (karate) =

South African martial artist and actor (1936–2025)

- Born: 6 September 1936; South Africa
- Died: 31 July 2025 (aged 88); South Africa
- Style: Shotokan karate, judo
- Teachers: Keinosuke Enoeda, Masatoshi Nakayama, Masahiko Tanaka, Tetsuhiko Asai
- Rank: 9th dan karate (JKS); 7th dan Judo

Other information
- Website: Japan Karate Shoto Federation South Africa

Norman Robinson (6 September 1936 – 31 July 2025) was a South African karateka. He and Stan Schmidt were the first practitioners of Shotokan karate in South Africa and they instigated the establishment of the South African branch of the Japan Karate Association (JKA) in 1965 and popularized the art across the country.

In 1970 he was one of the first westerners to be invited into the JKA's famous Instructor Class in the Tokyo Honbu dojo, the invitation having been offered by Masatoshi Nakayama himself. Latterly, he established Japan Karate Shotokai South Africa (now known as Japan Karate Shoto Federation South Africa), having remained loyal to Tetsuhiko Asai after Asai established Japan Karate Shotokai.

Robinson was also a distinguished student of Judo, holding a 7th dan in that art, and was also known for his acting roles in several martial arts films. His son, Mark Robinson is multi-disciplinary martial artist and powerlifter.

== Early life ==
Robinson was born on 17 September 1936 in South Africa. He was the youngest of eight children and his father was a famous judo instructor having pioneered judo in South Africa in 1930. He had wanted to be a doctor, but through his father's influence devoted his time to martial arts, and travelled extensively to both practice and compete.

== Karate ==
During a South African Judo championship, Robinson was challenged by Sebastian Hawkins, an ex-student of his father, to take on a number of his students. Robinson defeated all of them, and one of these students was Stan Schmidt with whom Robinson became friends following their bout. Schmidt had been studying karate from books and practicing it within his dojo and in Robinson found someone that shared an interest in martial arts that went beyond Judo. Together they attempted to learn karate out of a book called "Mas Oyama Book of the Five Pinan Katas". They continued their training and in 1963 approached the Japanese Consulate asking for further information on Japanese Karate organizations. The Consulate put them in touch with JKA Tokyo and Schmidt actually travelled out to Japan to train with the JKA. In 1965 four instructors were brought to South Africa: Taiji Kase; Keinosuke Enoeda; Hirokazu Kanazawa; and Hiroshi Shirai. These instructors stayed for six months and from April to October 1965 Robinson trained 3 times a day, predominantly with Enoeda, and achieved his Shodan ('black belt') on 4 October 1965. Enoeda then left South Africa for the United Kingdom.

After this, Schmidt and Robinson spread Shotokan Karate further into South Africa and on many occasions they visited Japan during the 1960s, 1970s and 1980s. It was in Japan in 1970 that Robinson graded for his third dan ('Sandan') in the course of which he had to fight the renowned fighter, Masahiko Tanaka - already a 4th dan at the time. The fight went to ground in which Robinson utilized his judo by placing Tanaka in a Kesa-Gatame ('scarf-hold'), whereupon Nakayama stopped the fight. Out of the six people grading, Robinson was one of two to pass.

During the training for Sandan, Robinson attended the 7am morning class taught by Nakayama. He then later in the day attended the "foreigner’s class" but over a coffee with Nakayama he conveyed that he felt the level of karate in that class was not sufficient and asked if it was possible that he could train in the instructor's class. Nakayama agreed he became one of the first karateka from outside Japan to join the JKA Instructors Class, which Schmidt had dubbed 'The Hornet's Nest'. Initially, none of the Japanese would work with Robinson during kumite practice but after Nakayama introduced him to the class he was accepted by everyone.

== Film career ==
Robinson appeared in three films as a Martial Artist. In 1976, he and Stan Schmidt played Karate Fighters in Karate Killer and in the 1980 film, Gemini he played a Karate Instructor. His most famous role was as Gypsy Billy, in the 1981 film Kill and Kill Again.

== Death ==
Robinson died on 31 July 2025, at the age of 88.

== See also ==
- List of Shotokan organizations
