= Yutaka Yaguchi =

Japanese karateka (1932–2023)

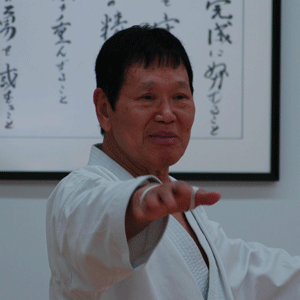
- Y. Yaguchi, March 2008
- Born: 矢口 豊 (Yaguchi Yutaka); November 14, 1932; Hiroshima, Japan
- Died: October 26, 2023 (aged 90)
- Style: Shotokan Karate
- Teachers: Gichin Funakoshi, Masatoshi Nakayama
- Rank: 9th dan karate

Other information
- Website: http://www.iskfmountainstates.com/

Yutaka Yaguchi (November 14, 1932 – October 26, 2023) was a Japanese karateka who was the Chief Instructor and Chairman of the International Shotokan Karate Federation (ISKF) Mountain States Region. He was born in Hiroshima, Japan, in 1932 and began karate training in 1952. He later tested under masters Gichin Funakoshi for his 1st dan black belt and Masatoshi Nakayama for his 2nd through 8th dan black belts. As one of the first graduates of the Japan Karate Association (JKA) Instructors' Training Program in 1959, he played an important role in the growth of JKA karate and the internationalization of Shotokan karate. Yaguchi first arrived in the United States on June 5, 1965. In 1974, Yaguchi founded the ISKF of Colorado, the regional headquarters for the Mountain States Region.

== Early life ==
Yaguchi was born on November 14, 1932, in Kure, a suburb of Hiroshima, Japan, on November 14, 1932, into a farming family. The youngest of five children, he had a carefree youth but was aware of the clouds of war. World War II impacted his life, at the end of the war, when he was assigned a job at a shipyard. On the morning of August 6, 1945, while he was waiting to enter the factory building at the shipyard, he saw the flash of the atomic bombing of Hiroshima.

After the war, Yutaka Yaguchi was able to resume his education, and was even able to go to university, unlike many of his former school mates. He went to Nihon University in Tokyo, and this is where he first started Shotokan karate. He also joined the JKA at that time. Training was very intense and heavily oriented to conditioning. Mr. Yaguchi graduated with a degree in Marine Biology, but was averse to sailing. After graduation, he found a job with a construction company.

One day in 1957, Sensei Masatoshi Nakayama asked Mr. Yaguchi to quit his job and join the JKA Instructor Training program full-time. Yaguchi quit his job the very next day and enrolled. When he graduated from the program in 1959, he was the fourth graduate behind Hirokazu Kanazawa, Takayuki Mikami, and Eiji Takaura.

== Competitive karate career ==
=== Early tournaments ===
Although Gichin Funakoshi, the founder of Shotokan karate, was adamantly opposed to tournaments, Masatoshi Nakayama was convinced that the future of karate depended on using tournaments to popularize karate to a worldwide audience. At the first JKA All-Japan Karate Championships in 1957, Yutaka Yaguchi achieved the unfortunate distinction of being the first contestant to foul out. Over the next half dozen years or so, he faced many of the greatest karate competitors, many who have subsequently been recognized as true masters of the art: Hirokazu Kanazawa, Hiroshi Shirai, Keinosuke Enoeda, Tetsuhiko Asai, Takayuki Mikami, etc.

=== United States ===
Sensei Nakayama sent Yutaka Yaguchi to America in 1965, and he began teaching in Sensei Hidetaka Nishiyama's dojo in Los Angeles. Soon after, he was invited to teach in Denver, CO, by Joe Castillo, and he relocated there for about a year, but finances were extremely tight. He returned to California and continued to teach at Sensei Nishiyama's dojo through the late 1960s and early 1970s.

=== Colorado ===
In 1972, the year Sensei Yaguchi permanently relocated back to Denver, he was the coach for the US team at the 1972 Shotocup World Tournament in France. This was a very controversial tournament that ended up with the US team walking out of the tournament under objections to unfair refereeing. In addition, Joe Castillo (the karate instructor who had originally invited Sensei Yaguchi to Denver in 1966) died. It was a time of upheaval in the new dojo, with many divided loyalties. After things began to settle down, the dojo began to grow.

== ISKF ==
=== Formation ===
Tension among the Japanese instructors in the AAKF, the American organization recognized by the JKA, lead to a heated meeting at the Olympic Motel in Los Angeles in 1977, which resulted in the split of the organization into two. Hidetaka Nishiyama retained control of the AAKF. The only Japanese instructor at the meeting who stayed with Nishiyama was Sensei Masataka Mori. The other five instructors formed a new organization called the ISKF: Teruyuki Okazaki, Takayuki Mikami, Yutaka Yaguchi, Shojiro Koyama, and Shigeru Takashina. The first organizational meeting was held in Denver, Colorado in 1978.

=== Independence ===
In June 2007, Okazaki made the decision to split away from the JKA. In this decision, he was supported by Sensei Yaguchi; however, the other three Japanese masters that were part of the ISKF hierarchy decided to remain with the JKA: Takayuki Mikami, Shojiro Koyama, and Shigeru Takashina. As Vice Chairman of the ISKF, and as Chairman of the ISKF technical committee under Sensei Okazaki, Sensei Yaguchi played a central role in the growth of the ISKF in the United States and around the world. Sensei Yaguchi remained the head of the technical committee after the death of Sensei Okazaki in 2020. Sensei Yaguchi later travelled to Japan to renew old acquaintances with the JKA honbu dojo.

Yutaka Yaguchi died on October 26, 2023, at the age of 90.

== Media ==
=== Book ===
- Yutaka Yaguchi with Catherine Pinch. (May 2008) "Mind and Body - Like Bullet", GreenLight Communications, ISBN 978-1-57833-400-1.

=== Magazine articles ===
- Masters Magazine, Summer 2008 "Yutaka Yaguchi: A Cut Above" (Magazine cover story and photo plus video on included DVD) p. 24–29.
- Shotokan Karate Magazine, July 2005, #84, "Sensei Yutaka Yaguchi" (magazine cover story and photo).
