= Frank Woon-A-Tai =

Guyanese martial artist

Frank Woon-A-Tai M.S., M.H.
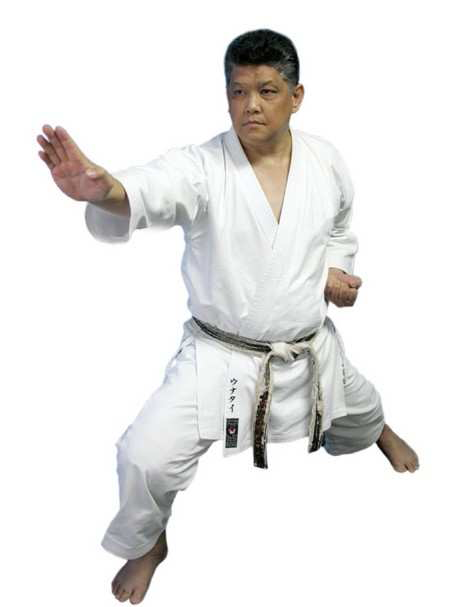
- Shuseki Shihan, Frank Woon-A-Tai, 9th Dan
- Born: May 22, 1950 (age 76); Georgetown, Guyana
- Education: Japan Karate Association Instructor Training Program (1989); University of Toronto (2004)
- Occupations: Chief Instructor of the International Karate Daigaku; Author
- Years active: 1964-present
- Organization: International Karate Daigaku
- Notable work: Shu-Ha-Ri: My Life in Japanese Karate (2020)
- Title: Shuseki Shihan
- Spouse: Maureen Woon-A-Tai (1974-present)
- Children: 3
- Relatives: D'Pharaoh Woon-A-Tai (grandson)
- Honours: The French Guiana Medal of Service (1996); Member of The Order of Guyana (2011)
- Website: www.internationalkaratedaigaku.com

Frank Woon-A-Tai (born May 22, 1950) is a Guyanese chief instructor of the International Karate Daigaku, President of the Caribbean Karate College, Chief instructor and Chairman of the Guyana Karate College, and Chairman of IKD Canada and IKD Guyana. He is a tenth-degree black belt in Shotokan Karate.

== Early life ==
Frank Woon-A-Tai was born on May 22, 1950, in Georgetown, Guyana. He revealed his DNA test results in his book, which came up as 86% Chinese from Canton and 14% Afro-Guyanese.

== Career ==
In 1964, Woon-A-Tai began self-training in Guyana, which eventually led to earning his black belt in 1971 at the Mecca of Karate - the Japan Karate Association (JKA) HQ in Tokyo, Japan. He was the first, and to date, the only Guyanese to be awarded this rank from Japan. Woon-A-Tai spent the next 40 years training with Japanese masters such as Masatoshi Nakayama, Hidetaka Nishiyama, Teruyuki Okazaki, and Yutaka Yaguchi.

In 1978, Woon-A-Tai first gained international prominence at the Japan Karate Association's Pan American Championships in Montreal, Quebec, Canada, where he was named Kata Champion.

In 1989, Woon-A-Tai graduated as the first Guyanese/Canadian graduate of the ISKF/JKA Instructor Training Institute, which led to ISKF Technical degrees of A-class Instructor, A-class Examiner, and A-class Judge. He was the first in the ISKF to earn the highest rank granted to a non-Japanese – the JKA Seventh Dan, and one of the first four instructors to be promoted to ISKF Eighth Dan black belt.

Woon-A-Tai founded JKA Guyana in 1971 and was chief Instructor of JKA Jamaica from 1976 to 1980. After that, he moved to Toronto and served as ISKF Canada chairman for 26 years.

In 1981, Woon-A-Tai founded the Toronto JKA. He served as co-vice chairman of the ISKF Technical Committee for several years. He is the first chairman of the Caribbean Karate College, and in 2006, he founded the Guyana Karate College (GKC), a non-profit association.

In 2011, Woon-A-Tai received the official title to an acre of land from Dr. Bharrat Jagdeo, President of Guyana, to build a 12,000-square-foot GKC International Budokan Dojo. His five-year plan was to develop a massive four-storied complex that will house a martial arts arena, 48 student dormitories, 24 apartments for coaches and officials, and a restaurant on the top floor overlooking the Atlantic Ocean.

Woon-A-Tai returned to school at age 50 and, at age 54, graduated from the University of Toronto with a Bachelor of Arts Degree in Japanese studies with a minor in history. In 2011, he was appointed to the Order of Service of Guyana, M.S. In 1996, he also received the French Guiana Medal of Honour, M.H., for 20 years of karate service to that country.

In 2011, he founded the IKD - International Karate Daigaku (University), with a membership of 80 regions in 56 countries in ten whole years.

Woon-A-Tai is the author of Shu-Ha-Ri: My Life in Japanese Karate, published by IKD Honbu Inc., 2020 and has produced DVDs: FW Vintage Demonstration, 1992; Eclipse of Life, 1997; Soul of Kata 1, 2000; IKD First World Cup, 2012; Road to the Cup, 2015; and The Next Generation; 2015. He also edited several newsletters, technical manuals and written several association by-laws.

== Championships and awards ==
Woon-A-Tai first gained international prominence when he won the JKA Pan American kata championship in 1978.

=== Awards/medals ===
- Awarded The French Guiana Medal of Service in 1996.
- Georgetown, Guyana Mayor's Award in 2009.
- Member of The Order of Guyana - recipient of the Medal of Service from Bharrat Jagdeo, President of Guyana, in October 2011.

== Education ==
- JKA Instructor Training Program, 1989
- BA, University of Toronto, 2004, Japanese Studies

== Personal life ==
On June 1, 1974, Frank Woon-A-Tai married Maureen, a fellow karate-ka, in Georgetown, Guyana. Together they have three children, five grandchildren including D'Pharaoh Woon-A-Tai, and two great-grandchildren. The Woon-A-Tai family currently reside in Toronto, Ontario, Canada.
