= Japan Shotokan Karate Association =

Kareta association

- Abbreviation: JSKA
- Formation: 10 February 1999
- Founders: Keigo Abe, 10th Dan
- Type: Sports federation
- Headquarters: JAPAN - 272-0034 - Chiba Ken - Ichikawa Shi - Ichikawa 3-10-18
- Official language: Japanese, English
- Website: http://www.jska.jp

Japan Shotokan Karate Association (JSKA) was founded by Keigo Abe in 1999. Abe was a former instructor graduate of the Japan Karate Association and trained and taught at the JKA Headquarters for nearly 35 years. He held a number of senior positions within the JKA and latterly the Matsuno section of the JKA. He had been a senior student of Nakayama and as such the teachings of Nakayama remain an integral part of the evolution of the Shotokan style within the JSKA. Abe Sensei died on 20 December 2019. And he was awarded a posthumous 10th Dan by the JSKA Shihankai on his passing. The current Chief Instructor is Mitsuru Nagaki, 9th Dan, a student of Abe and former instructor with the Japan Karate Shotorenmei.

== Origins ==
Abe Keigo founded the Japan Shotokan Karate Association 10 February 1999 following his retirement as Technical Director of the JKA (Matsuno section) on 31 January 1999.

Abe Keigo, born in October 1938, had started Karate and Judo training when he was 15 years old, and it was in 1958 that he started to train progressing onto the famous instructors course at the Headquarters of the Japan Karate Association (JKA). He became a loyal student of Nakayama Masatoshi, who was to become not only JKA Headmaster, but his personal mentor and instructor. Abe trained there every day for nearly 35 years. In 1965 Abe graduated as a JKA instructor, and in 1985 was appointed Director of Qualifications. Whilst at the JKA, Keigo Abe saw a number of divisions arise from the 1970s onwards, such as in 1977, when JKA instructor Shiro Asano formed his own organization (which was to become Shotokan Karate-Do International Federation SKIF), taking with him Hirokazu Kanazawa as chief instructor.

Following Nakayama's death in 1987, the JKA experienced a further turbulent period, both at the Tokyo headquarters and worldwide. Taiji Kase and Hiroshi Shirai, senior JKA instructors in Europe, quit to form the World Karate-Do Shotokan Academy. Taketo Okuda, JKA chief instructor in Brazil, quit to focus on his own organization, Butoku-kan. Abe himself became involved in a split in 1990, when a legal dispute started between two groups about the control of JKA. One group was led by Tetsuhiko Asai, the JKA chief instructor after Nakayama with Raizo Matsuno. The other was led by Nobuyuki Nakahara and included Masaaki Ueki and Masahiko Tanaka. Tetsuhiko Asai's group, known as the Matsuno section, included Keigo Abe and Mikio Yahara. In 1990, Abe was appointed Technical Director of the JKA (Matsuno section), a position held until retiring from the JKA (Matsuno section) on 31 January 1999. The Matsuno section itself disbanded when, after several court rulings, the issue of the rights to the JKA brand was ultimately settled by the Japanese Supreme Court on 10 June 1999, in favor of Nakahara's group.

Abe is quoted as saying "I feel however that Karate nowadays is centered only on winning competitions and that everybody trains towards this end. This is far from the truth. I believe that the true purpose of Karate lies in daily training with a goal to develop a strong mind and body and furthermore to contribute to society in general." Abe established the JSKA to realize what he himself saw as the true purpose of Karate.

The JSKA claims members in over 40 countries globally while the organization's stated goals are to teach karate as a martial art based on the Japanese concepts of Budo and to gain perfection of technique and self-defense, while improving health, confidence and mental attitude. It differentiates itself from other organizations by proclaiming a return to the traditional values and training methods of the Japan Karate Association as laid down by Masatoshi Nakayama, the JKA’s first chief instructor. Its students suggested that through the teachings of their chief instructor Keigo Abe, a direct student of Masotoshi Nakayama who in turn was taught by the founder of the style Gichin Funakoshi, that 'the Shotokan Legacy continues'.

The JSKA emphasizes the development of techniques utilising the low and long stances introduced by Yoshitaka Funakoshi and passed on through Nakayama to Abe. And, although they are a general feature of the Shotokan style, the self-defense/budo elements are continually stressed, where the significance of natural action, utilising good posture and biomechanics, ensures the execution of an effective technique. Although the JSKA does accept the need for tournaments, its use of the ippon shobu rules guarantees that the concept of ‘one strike, one kill’ is still maintained in their training.

== Chief instructor ==
Keigo Abe, the first chief instructor of the association, died on 21 December 2019 in Matsuyama, Ehime Prefecture, at the home of Mitsuru Nagaki. Following Abe's wishes, Nagaki was named his successor as chief instructor of the JSKA about a month later.

Nagaki was born in 1950 in Ehime, the same prefecture as Abe. Later, when he entered Nihon University, he studied karate under Abe's guidance. According to Yasuhisa Shiozaki, the JSKA chairman, he "never fails to practice hard and is breaking an unprecedented record of winning 27 consecutive master class championships." Shiozaki also noted that the care Nagaki and his family provided to Abe at the end of his life told members all they needed to know about him. His most prominent student to date is his son, Shinji Nagaki, who was under-70 kg kumite world champion at the 2004 WKF World Championships, and a headquarters instructor for the Japan Karate Shotorenmei.

At the time of his appointment, Mitsuru Nagaki held the grade of 8th Dan. He was further graded to 9th Dan by the JSKA Shihankai on 24 December 2022.

== Grades ==
For all Kyū gradings, the student must demonstrate to the examiners tier understanding of the three facets of the style; set patterns (kata), basics (kihon) and sparring (kumite). Grades are examined with the karateka presenting themselves for assessment, with the permission of their instructor, every three to four months. This situation last between 10th kyu and 1st kyu, depending on the affiliate association. The minimum waiting period between 1st kyu and 1st dan is typically a 6-12 month. Time between dan gradings increases approximately in yearly increments as the grade progresses. Kyu Grades run from 10th kyu to 1st Kyu and Dan grades from 1st Dan to10th Dan. Although kyu grades are coloured to show progression, all dan grades wear only black belts. Dan gradings are taken under an authorized grading examiner. Senior grades above 5th Dan come specifically under the auspices of the JSKA Chief Instructor and are examined at national/international events (such as National/International Competitions). Depending on the grade being taken a similar format to the kyu grades is required covering all three sections of the training. The karateka must demonstrate a single kata of their choice while the chief examiner will choose another kata from a set list, depending on grade, to be performed. As the grades progress a research paper must be presented and the bunkai (application) of a kata chosen by the examiner, must be shown and explained.

=== Major Championships ===
==== World Cup/World Championship ====
The JSKA has since its inception ran a World Championships every 2 years:

- 2002 - Germany
- 2004 - South Africa
- 2006 - United States
- 2008 - United Kingdom
- 2010 - Portugal
- 2012 - Mexico
- 2014 - Italy
- 2016 - Namibia
- 2018 - Russia

== JSKA Officials ==
| Instructor | Rank | Position | Country |
| Keigo Abe (deceased) | 10th Dan (Posthumously) | Founder and First Headmaster | Japan |
| Mitsuru Nagaki | 9th Dan | Chief Instructor / Shihankai | Japan | JSKA |
| Makoto Matsunami | 8th Dan | International Technical Director | Japan |
| Takashi Naito | 6th Dan | International Director of Administration | Japan |
| Dieter Flindt | 8th Dan | European Technical Director | JSKA Germany |
| Vilaca Cristóvão Pinto | 8th Dan | Technical Director | JSKA Portugal |
| Khosro Taghva | 8th Dan | Technical Director | JSKA Italy |
| Hans Muller | 8th Dan | Technical Director | JSKA Switzerland |
| Soon Pretorius | 8th Dan | Technical Director | JSKA South Africa |
| Alexander Drannick | 8th Dan | Technical Director | JSKA Russia/St Petersburg |
| Mohamed Behrami | 8th Dan | Technical Director | JSKA Iran |
| Roberto Mendes | 7th Dan | Technical Director | JSKA Brazil |
| Fuad N. Saeed | 6th Dan | Technical Director/ Examiner/ judg/ Instructor | Kurdistan Region-Iraq |

=== Former JSKA Officials and Shihankai members ===
| Instructor | Rank | Positions Held | Country | Current Affiliation |
| Masahisa Iida | 8th Dan | Director / Shihankai | Japan | Independent |
| Tsunehiro Sato | 8th Dan | Director / Shihankai | Japan | Independent |
| Jan Knobel | 9th Dan | Technical Director / Shihankai | Netherlands | WJKA |
| George Carruthers | 9th Dan | European Director Operations / Shihankai | Great Britain | ISKS |
| Charles Gidley (deceased) | 10th Dan (Posthumously) | Technical Director / Shihankai | Great Britain | ISKS |
