= Isao Obata =

Japanese karateka (1904–1976)

- Born: 1904; Tokyo, Japan
- Died: 1976 (aged 71–72); Tokyo, Japan
- Other names: "Elephant"
- Style: Shotokan Karate, Kyudo, Judo, Kendo
- Teacher: Gichin Funakoshi
- Rank: 5th dan karate

Other information
- Spouse: Miyako Obata
- Notable students: Tsutomu Ohshima, Kazumi Tabata, Shigeru Egami, Masatoshi Nakayama, Hidetaka Nishiyama, Taiji Kase, Masanobu Nihei

Isao Obata (小畑 功, Obata Isao; 1904–1976) was a pioneering Japanese master of Shotokan karate. He was a senior student of Gichin Funakoshi, who is widely recognized as the founder of modern karate, and was a key figure in the establishment of the Japan Karate Association (JKA) under Funakoshi in 1949. Obata also helped introduce karate to the United States of America through his demonstrations of the art to United States Air Force personnel, and through his students, most notably Tsutomu Ohshima.

== Early life ==
Obata was born in 1904 in the Tokyo area of Japan, the son of Kyuichi Obata and Toyoko Obata (née Ishiguro). His father owned several silk mills in the region, and moved the family to different towns as demanded by his work. Obata lost two brothers in infancy, and grew up with one younger brother and one younger sister. As a child, he had a great interest in the martial arts, and left it to his brother, Satoru, to prepare to lead the family business eventually.

At school, Obata trained in judo, kendo (swordsmanship), and kyudo (archery). Unlike most Japanese boys of the time, he went through several schools, and entered Keio Preparatory School in Tokyo around 1922. A friend gave him a copy of Gichin Funakoshi's first book on karate, and this sparked Obata's interest in the art. Upon completion of his secondary education, Obata gained entry to Keio University. In 1923, Funakoshi accepted a position teaching karate at the university, and Obata was one of the first students in line. He would go on to become one of Funakoshi's senior students. The Great Kantō earthquake struck later that year, destroying most of Tokyo, including Keio University's karate dojo (training hall). The students rebuilt the dojo within a year, however, and training resumed.

Kyuichi Obata was too busy with his business to have studied the martial arts himself, but was pleased at his son's commitment to karate; one of the family's ancestors had been Obata Nobusada, a famous samurai, general and governor under the daimyō (feudal lord) Takeda Shingen in the 16th century. Toyoko Obata was a deeply religious Christian and saw the martial arts as contradictory to her beliefs, but never inhibited her son's training.

== Karate career ==
Over the next few years, Obata assisted Funakoshi with teaching karate at Takushoku University, Waseda University, and Hitotsubashi University (then known as Shoka University). He became the inaugural captain of Keio University's karate club. In 1926, Funakoshi awarded black belt status to his most senior students, including Obata. Obata's father died of a heart attack in 1927.

In 1932, Obata travelled to Manchuria, and was to work there for more than 10 years as an economic adviser to the Manchurian Aviation Corporation. He was responsible for flight scheduling and operations. During this time, he taught karate privately to a few friends and students, but turned his focus to kyudo. His mother introduced him to a young woman, Miyako, and the two were married in Tokyo by 1935. In 1940, he returned to Tokyo to represent Manchuria at a kyudo tournament, and won the competition. For a time, he was much better known for his expertise in kyudo than in karate.

During the first few months of World War II, Obata was promoted to the rank of 5th dan in Shotokan karate. When Japan entered the war, Obata's brother Satoru joined the Imperial Japanese Army as an officer. S. Obata had practised judo and was ranked 2nd dan in karate. He died in the bitter fighting for Iwo Jima, and this meant that Obata had to return to Japan to look after his mother and sister. His brother's death affected him deeply, for the two had been very close. With the end of the war, the occupying forces suspended all martial arts training in Japan for three years; it was only then that Obata could resume training under Funakoshi. In the meantime, he worked at international trading company Hirano Seiko.

On May 27, 1949, Obata, Masatoshi Nakayama, Shigeru Egami, and other colleagues established the Japan Karate Association (JKA) under Funakoshi. Obata was the inaugural Chairman of the JKA, with Funakoshi as Honorary Chief Instructor and Nakayama as Chief Instructor. In 1954, he left the JKA when the organization became increasingly commercial and militaristic in nature. Along with Nakayama, Hidetaka Nishiyama, and others, he began teaching personnel from the US Strategic Air Command (SAC) who were based in Japan. Through Emilio Bruno of the SAC, whom Obata had earlier met through his work at Hirano Seiko, SAC headquarters invited Obata to visit the US to demonstrate his art. For two months in 1953, he flew from base to base, demonstrating Shotokan karate to US military personnel; he then returned to teaching in Japan.

== Later life ==
Obata's master, Funakoshi, died in 1957. While Funakoshi had been honorary head of the JKA, Obata felt that the university karate clubs (Keio, Waseda, Takushoku, Hitotsubashi, and Hosei) most faithfully represented the spirit of Funakoshi's karate. Through the 1950s and 1960s, Obata continued teaching karate to SAC personnel at the Kodokan. In 1968, he visited the US again and was honored by his student Tsutomu Ohshima, who had established the Southern California Karate Association. Obata's mother died that year. Another pioneer of karate in California, Dan Ivan, also studied under Obata.

In his final years, Obata lived with his wife in the outskirts of Tokyo, spending his days teaching karate or tending to his garden. While officially retired, he continued teaching four nights and four evenings each week at Keio University and Meiji University. His students presented him with a plaque reading: "Like your nickname, Elephant, you are strong, big and gentle. We thank you for the lessons you have taught us." In a 1972 interview, Obata expressed disillusionment with the development of karate, saying, "Karate is dying now. It cannot last longer than a few more decades." He died in 1976.

== See also ==
- List of Shotokan organizations
