= 良生 =

良生, meaning 'good born', may refer to:

- Liangsheng, a masculine Chinese given name for Li Liangsheng
- Ryōsei, a masculine Japanese given name
- Yoshitaka, a masculine Japanese given name
