= Shigeru Takashina =

Japanese kareteka

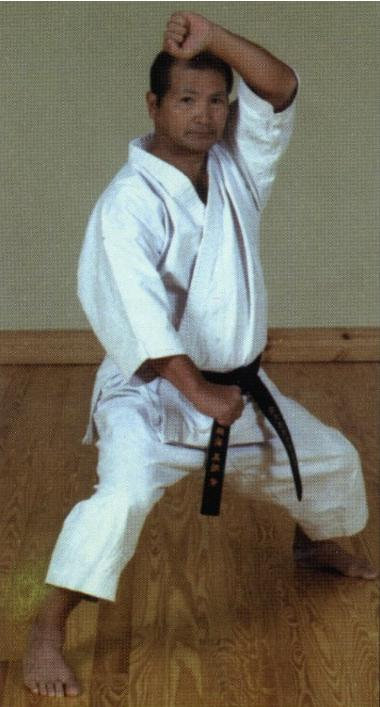
- Born: September 28, 1943; Tomonoura, Hiroshima prefecture, Japan
- Died: September 3, 2013 (aged 69); Coral Springs, Florida, USA
- Style: Shotokan Karate
- Teacher(s): Masatoshi Nakayama
- Rank: 9th dan karate

Shigeru Takashina (September 28, 1943 – September 3, 2013) was the founder and Chief Instructor of the South Atlantic Karate Association, an organization of the Japan Karate Association (JKA). In 1966 he graduated from Ryukoku University in Kyoto and entered the Instructor School of the Japan Karate Association, graduating in 1968. Takashina was the Captain of the Japan team in the 1st World Karate Championships held in Tokyo in 1970 and scored a perfect win. He moved to the United States in 1972.

== ISKF ==
Under Teruyuki Okazaki, Takashina was a founding member of the International Shotokan Karate Federation along with Takayuki Mikami, Yutaka Yaguchi and Shojiro Koyama. In June 2007, the ISKF made the decision to leave the JKA. Yaguchi continued his affiliation with the ISKF, however, the other founding Masters decided to remain with the JKA and formed the JKA World Federation - America (JKA/WF). Takashina's perspective on this difficult transition is published.
