= Takashina =

Takashina (written: 高品 or 高階) is a Japanese surname. Notable people with the surname include:

- Kaku Takashina (高品 格; 1919–1994), Japanese actor
- Takashina no Takako (高階 貴子; died 996), Japanese waka poet
- Shigeru Takashina (1943–2013), Japanese karateka
- Takeshi Takashina (高品 彪; 1891–1944), Japanese general

== See also ==
- Takashina Station, a railway station in Ibi District, Gifu Prefecture, Japan
