= Karate at the 2001 World Games – Women's kata =

Karate women's kata at the 2001 World Games
- Venue: Tenno Town Gymnasium, Tenno, Akita, Japan
- Dates: 19 August 2001
- Competitors: 9 from 9 nations

Medalists
gold medal	(Japan) Atsuko Wakai
silver medal	(Venezuela) Yohana Sánchez
bronze medal	(United States) Junko Arai

The women's kata competition in karate at the 2001 World Games took place on 19 August 2001 at the Tenno Town Gymnasium in Tenno, Akita, Japan.

== Competition format ==
A total of 9 athletes entered the competition. They fought in cup system with repechages.

== Results ==
=== Gold medal bracket ===
Athlete	Score	Athlete
(Germany) Shahrzad Mansouri	0 - 3	(Japan) Atsuko Wakai

Quarterfinals
(Japan) Atsuko Wakai (JPN)	3
(South Africa) Karin Prinsloo (RSA)	0
(United States) Junko Arai (USA)	3
(Finland) Miia Kulmala (FIN)	0
(Australia) Kara Sleigh (AUS)	0
(Venezuela) Yohana Sánchez (VEN)	3
(Mexico) Ericka Lozano (MEX)	0
(Slovakia) Marcela Remiasova (SVK)	3

Semifinals
(Japan) Atsuko Wakai (JPN)	3
(United States) Junko Arai (USA)	0
(Venezuela) Yohana Sánchez (VEN)	2
(Slovakia) Marcela Remiasova (SVK)	1

Final
(Japan) Atsuko Wakai (JPN)	3
(Venezuela) Yohana Sánchez (VEN)	0

=== Bronze medal bracket ===
Athlete	Score	Athlete
(South Africa) Karin Prinsloo	0 - 3	(Germany) Shahrzad Mansouri

Repechage
(Germany) Shahrzad Mansouri (GER)	1
(United States) Junko Arai (USA)	2
(Australia) Kara Sleigh (AUS)	2
(Slovakia) Marcela Remiasova (SVK)	1

Third place
(United States) Junko Arai (USA)	3
(Australia) Kara Sleigh (AUS)	0
