= Karate at the 2001 World Games – Women's kumite 60 kg =

Karate women's kumite 60 kg at the 2001 World Games
- Venue: Tenno Town Gymnasium, Tenno, Akita, Japan
- Dates: 18 August 2001
- Competitors: 6 from 4 nations

Medalists
gold medal	(South Africa) Karin Prinsloo
silver medal	(Australia) Kellie Shimmings
bronze medal	(Serbia and Montenegro) Roksanda Lazarević

The women's kumite 60 kg competition in karate at the 2001 World Games took place on 18 August 2001 at the Tenno Town Gymnasium in Tenno, Akita, Japan.

== Competition format ==
A total of 6 athletes entered the competition. In preliminary round they fought in two groups. Winners of this groups advanced to gold medal match. Second place athletes advanced to bronze medal match.

== Results ==
=== Preliminary round ===
==== Group A ====
Rank	Athlete	B	W	D	L	Pts	SP	RSA	YUG	JPN
1	Karin Prinsloo (RSA)	2	1	1	0	3	7		D	W
2	Roksanda Lazarević (YUG)	2	1	1	0	3	4	D		W
3	Hiroka Sato (JPN)	2	0	0	2	0	5	L	L	

==== Group B ====
Rank	Athlete	B	W	D	L	Pts	SP	AUS	JPN	YUG
1	Kellie Shimmings (AUS)	2	1	0	1	2	6		L	W
2	Yuya Hirata (JPN)	2	1	0	1	2	4	W		L
3	Sladana Mitić (YUG)	2	1	0	1	2	4	L	W	

=== Finals ===
	Score	
Gold medal match
Karin Prinsloo (RSA)	7−3	Kellie Shimmings (AUS)
Bronze medal match
Roksanda Lazarević (YUG)	0−0	Yuya Hirata (JPN)
