= Muhammad Muchlas Rowi =

Prominent Traditional Karate Figure from Indonesia (born 1972)

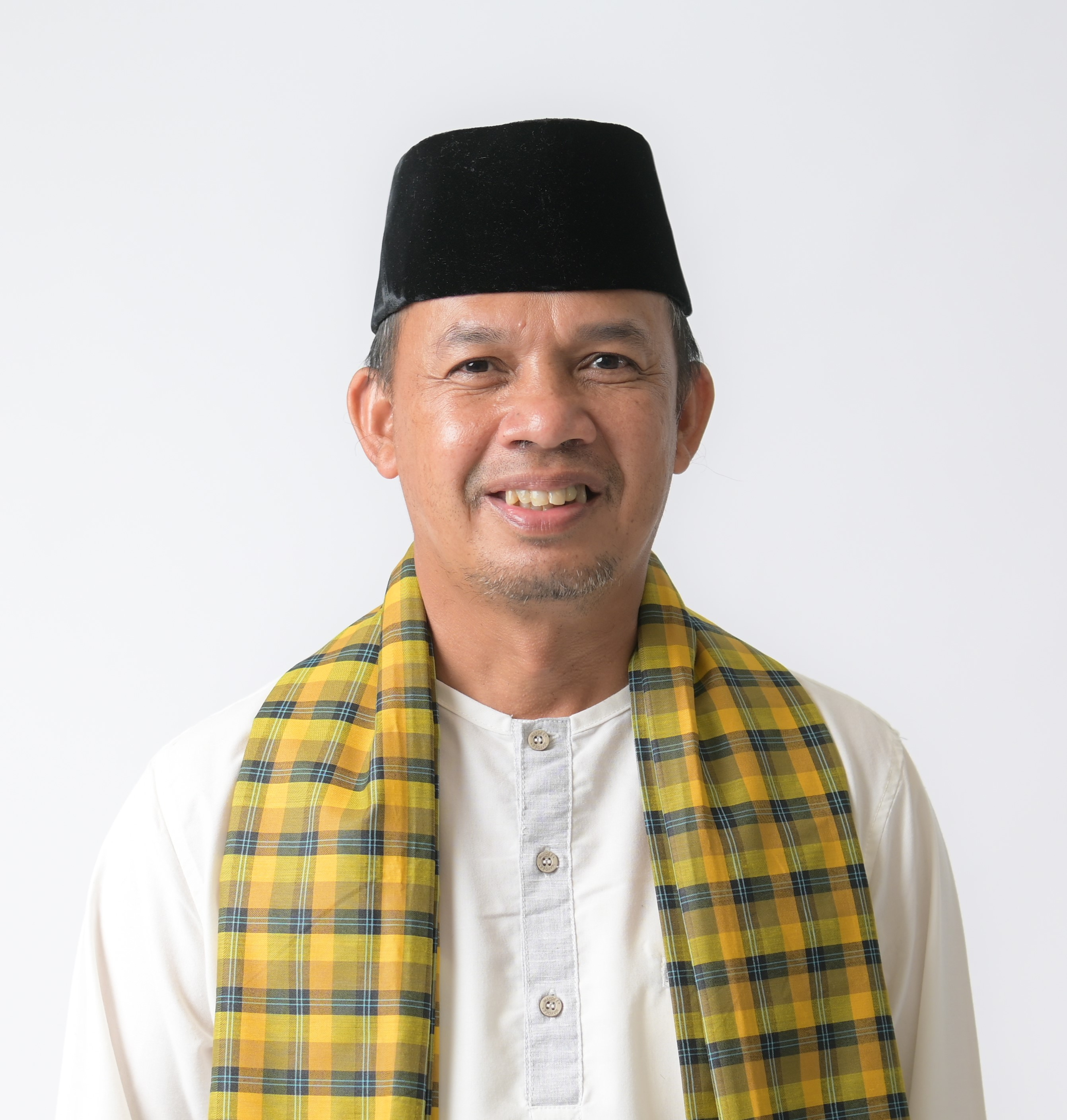
- Mr Muchlas in 2023

The Chairman of the Indonesia Traditional Karate Federation (INATKF) General Secretary of the International Traditional Karate Federation (ITKF) Asia/Oceania

Personal details
- Born: August 31, 1972 (age 53) Garut, West Java, Indonesia
- Education: Gadjah Mada University
- Occupation: Activist, businessman

Muhammad Muchlas Rowi (born August 31, 1972) is the Chairman of the Indonesia Traditional Karate Federation (INATKF) as well as the Secretary General of the International Traditional Karate Federation (ITKF) for the Asia and Oceania region. Muchlas served as a delegate representing ITKF at the 28th World Congress of The Association for International Sports for All (TAFISA) held in Dusseldorf, Germany, in November 2023. TAFISA is an organization overseeing sports in 170 countries and is a partner of the International Olympic Committee (IOC), UNESCO, the World Health Organization (WHO), and the International Association for Sports and Leisure Facilities (IAKS). Muchlas Rowi is also an activist within Muhammadiyah and serves as an Independent Commissioner of PT Jaminan Kredit Indonesia (Jamkrindo).

== Education ==
Muchlas Rowi was born in Garut, West Java on August 31, 1972. He received his education at the Darul Arqam Muhammadiyah Islamic boarding school in Garut. He completed his undergraduate studies at the Faculty of Philosophy, Gadjah Mada University, Yogyakarta in 1998, and obtained a Master's in Management from STIE IBMT Surabaya in 2019. He also completed a doctoral program in theology at STT Anugrah Indonesia in 2021 and a doctoral program in law at 17 Agustus 1945 Jakarta University in 2023.

== Career ==
Muchlas began his organizational career at the Muhammadiyah Student Association during his school years. In 1998, he became a public relations officer for the Indonesian Travel Agency Association in Yogyakarta and a director at Muhammadiyah-owned company PT Surya Sarana Utama. He later served as a member of the Education Board Leadership of Muhammadiyah Central Board from 2005 to 2010.

In 2014, Muchlas served as the Secretary General of the PSSI DKI Jakarta Province. During his leadership, Muchlas advocated for DKI Jakarta to host the National Sports Week (Pekan Olahraga Nasional, PON). However, this plan did not materialize due to the inability of Gusti Randa, the Chairman of the PSSI DKI Jakarta Province at the time, to convince DKI Jakarta as a suitable host for the PON. It was during this time that Muchlas proposed the idea of DKI Jakarta having a new internationally-capable stadium, which was realized in the era of DKI Jakarta Governor Anies Baswedan as the Jakarta International Stadium (JIS).

On October 17, 2019, through the Minister of State-Owned Enterprises Decree Number SK-241/MBU/10/2019, Muchlas was appointed by the Minister of State-Owned Enterprises, Rini Soemarno, as an Independent Commissioner of PT Jamkrindo. Muchlas was tasked with overseeing the company's information technology governance to facilitate financial accessibility for Micro, Small, and Medium Enterprises (MSMEs) to financial institutions.

In 2020, Muchlas became the Chairman of INATKF. In the same year, INATKF won three Gold, two Silver, and seven Bronze medals at the 2020 Afro-Asia Online Traditional Karate Championship. At the 3rd Asia Oceania/Asian Cup in Tashkent, Uzbekistan at the end of December 2022, the Indonesian contingent also brought home five Gold and two Silver medals. In the same year, Muchlas also served as the Secretary General of ITKF for the Asia/Oceania region concurrent with the World Traditional Karate Championship in Slovenia, involving 35 countries. Muchlas officially brought INATKF to be recognized by the state and became a full member of the Indonesian Community Recreation Sports Committee (KORMI).

In 2022, Muchlas became the Deputy Treasurer II of the Muhammadiyah Higher Education and Research Council. One of his focuses in the council was the issue of Gross Enrollment Ratio in Higher Education which in 2023 was still far from the target of the 2024 National Medium-Term Development Plan (RPJMN) and required synergy between private and public universities.
