= Kazumi Tabata =

Japanese karate grand master

Kazumi Tabata (田畑 和美, Tabata Kazumi) was an 8th degree Grand Master in Shotokan karate. Born in Japan in 1943, Master Tabata started karate at age 13 and received the rank of nidan in Shorinji-ryu Renshinkan as a freshman in high school. Master Tabata went to Waseda University and started studying Shotokan style karate under Master Isao Obata, one of Master Gichin Funakoshi's first students and first chairman of the Japan Karate Association. He founded the North American Karate-Do Federation (NAKF) and the New England Collegiate Karate Conference (NECKC), and lived in Massachusetts in the United States where he taught regularly until his death in 2020.

== Competitive History ==
Master Tabata was the captain of the karate club at Waseda University, and, after moving to the United States at the behest of his sensei to spread Shotokan Karate, he was the captain of the US Karate Team for two decades, representing the US in many international tournaments. In addition, he was the technical director for the US National Olympic Committee.

== North American Karate-do Federation ==
The North American Karate-do Federation is a collection of Shotokan karate schools, mostly in New England and centered in Greater Boston. The organization was founded in 1968 by Master Tabata at the urging of his teacher Master Isao Obata. Its sister organisation is the NECKC, and together they host a bi-annual tournament.

=== Current members ===
- Haverhill [Youth Empower House], under Sensei Robert Harb - Haverhill, Massachusetts.
- Triumph Martial Arts, under Sensei Mark Ryder - Concord, Massachusetts.
- Lunenburg School, under Sensei George Noone - Lunenburg, Massachusetts.
- Tiger Mountain Shotokan Karate, under Sensei Gayle Fleming - New London, New Hampshire.
- Wyoming Valley Karate Club, under Sensei James Ambrose - Plains Township, Pennsylvania.

== The New England Collegiate Karate Conference ==
The New England Collegiate Karate Conference is a group of colleges and universities in the New England area, centered in Boston, that was founded by, and train under, Tabata. It is a sister organization of the NAKF. Current members are listed below and past members have also included Northeastern University, Yale University, and University of Massachusetts Amherst, Harvard University.

=== Current members ===
- Boston College
- Boston University
- Massachusetts Institute of Technology
- Tufts University
- University of Massachusetts Lowell
- Wellesley College

== Bibliography ==
- Tabata, Kazumi (1974). Power Karate: Basic Karate Techniques for Colleges (first ed.). Bermuda Press. ASIN B0007AI4XS.
- Tabata, Kazumi (2003). Secret Tactics: Lessons from the Great Master of Martial Arts (first ed.). Tuttle Publishing. ISBN 0-8048-3488-1.
- Tabata, Kazumi (2010). Mind Power: Secret Strategies for the Martial Arts (first ed.). Tuttle Publishing. ISBN 978-0-8048-4109-2.
- Tabata, Kazumi (2011). Kudensho: Secrets of Karate (first ed.). Infinity Publishing. ISBN 978-0741464163.
