= Mark Robinson (martial artist) =

South African martial artist (born 1963)

- Born: Mark David Robinson; 18 March 1963 (age 63); South Africa
- Nickname: White Rhino
- Height: 6 ft 0 in (1.83 m)
- Weight: 300 lb (136 kg; 21 st 6 lb)
- Division: Super heavyweight
- Style: Wrestling
- Team: Mark Robinson MMA

Mixed martial arts record
- Total: 2
- Wins: 1
- By submission: 1
- Losses: 0
- No contests: 1

Other information
- Notable relatives: Norman Robinson (father)
- Mixed martial arts record from Sherdog

Mark David Robinson (born 18 March 1963) is a South African martial artist and powerlifter. He is considered to be one of South Africa's most accomplished athletes due to his accomplishments in several wrestling styles (freestyle, Greco-Roman, sumo) and powerlifting.

== Background ==
Robinson was born to a family of martial artists. His father, Norman Robinson, was one of the first practitioners of Shotokan Karate in South Africa and helped instigate the establishment of the South African branch of the Japan Karate Association. His grandfather, Jack Robinson, was a pioneer of judo in South Africa and set up an establishment that would later become Judo South Africa.

== Grappling career ==
Robinson's earliest sporting achievement was in 1982, when he became the South African judo champion in the heavyweight division.

Robinson later started pursuing various forms of amateur wrestling including both Greco-Roman and freestyle. From 1994 to 1996, he won multiple medals in wrestling at the African Wrestling Championship and African Games. His strong performance at the 1996 Acropolis Wrestling Grand Prix qualified him for a spot at the 1996 Summer Olympics in Greco-Roman wrestling. However, he was unable to compete due to budget restrictions.

Robinson competed in the 1996 Sumo World Championship with only a few months of training. In the finals, he defeated Emmanuel Yarbrough to become champion of the openweight class.

Robinson competed at the 2001 ADCC Submission Fighting World Championship in the +99 kg category against several strong candidates. He defeated Valeriy Yureskul, Vitor Belfort and Ricco Rodriguez to reach the final, where he defeated Jeff Monson to become champion.

== Powerlifting career ==
Around the same time he started his grappling career, Robinson also participated in powerlifting.

He is a multiple time medalist at WPC World Championships including winner of the 1990 World Championship at the +140 kg category.

=== Personal Bests ===
- Squat – 496/936.9 lb (Raw/Single)
- Bench press – 297.6/595.2 lb (Raw/Single)
- Deadlift – 545.6/821.2 lb (Raw/Single
- Total – 1289.7/2353.4 lb (Raw/Single)

== Mixed martial arts career ==
Robinson had a brief career in mixed martial arts.

On 26 August 2000, he fought for the promotion, World Extreme Fighting at the event WEF – New Blood Conflict. He faced Joe Leyva and won by submission in less than 30 seconds.

On 23 February 2001, he fought for the promotion, Ultimate Fighting Championship at the event UFC 30. He faced Bobby Hoffman and was knocked out in the first round by a standing elbow strike. However Hoffman failed a drug test afterwards and the decision was changed to a no-contest.

== Personal life ==
Robinson lives in Johannesburg with his wife Deirdre and daughter.

Robinson set up a martial arts academy in 2001 in South Africa.

== Mixed martial arts record ==
Professional record breakdown
2 matches	1 win	0 losses
By submission	1	0
No contests	1	

Res.	Record	Opponent	Method	Event	Date	Round	Time	Location	Notes
NC	1–0 (1)	Bobby Hoffman	NC (overturned)	UFC 30	23 February 2001	1	3:27	Atlantic City, New Jersey, United States	Originally a KO win for Hoffman; overturned due to Hoffman failing drug test.
Win	1–0	Joe Leyva	Submission (neck crank)	WEF: New Blood Conflict	26 August 2000	1	1:22	N/A	

== Submission wrestling record ==
10 Matches, 7 Wins, 3 Losses
Result	Rec.	Opponent	Method	Event	Division	Date	Location
Lose	7–3	(United States) Reese Andy		ADCC 2003	Absolute	2003	(Brazil) São Paulo
Lose	7–2	(United States) Mike van Arsdale		ADCC 2003	+99 kg	2003	(Brazil) São Paulo
Win	7–1	(United States) Jeff Monson	Points	ADCC 2001	+99 kg	2001	(United Arab Emirates) Abu Dhabi
Win	6–1	(United States) Ricco Rodriguez	Penalty	ADCC 2001	+99 kg	2001	(United Arab Emirates) Abu Dhabi
Win	5–1	(Brazil) Vitor Belfort	Penalty	ADCC 2001	+99 kg	2001	(United Arab Emirates) Abu Dhabi
Win	4–1	(Ukraine) Valeriy Yureskul	Submission	ADCC 2001	+99 kg	2001	(United Arab Emirates) Abu Dhabi
Lose	3–1	(Brazil) Ricardo Morais		ADCC 2000	+99 kg	2000	(United Arab Emirates) Abu Dhabi
Win	3–0	(United Kingdom) Lee Hasdell		ADCC 2000	+99 kg	2000	(United Arab Emirates) Abu Dhabi
Win	2–0	(Brazil) Luis Roberto Duarte		ADCC 1999	+99 kg	1999	(United Arab Emirates) Abu Dhabi
Win	1–0	(Japan) Yasuaki Hiramatsu		ADCC 1999	+99 kg	1999	(United Arab Emirates) Abu Dhabi
