= Jaminan Kredit Indonesia =

Indonesian state-owned company in the guarantee industry

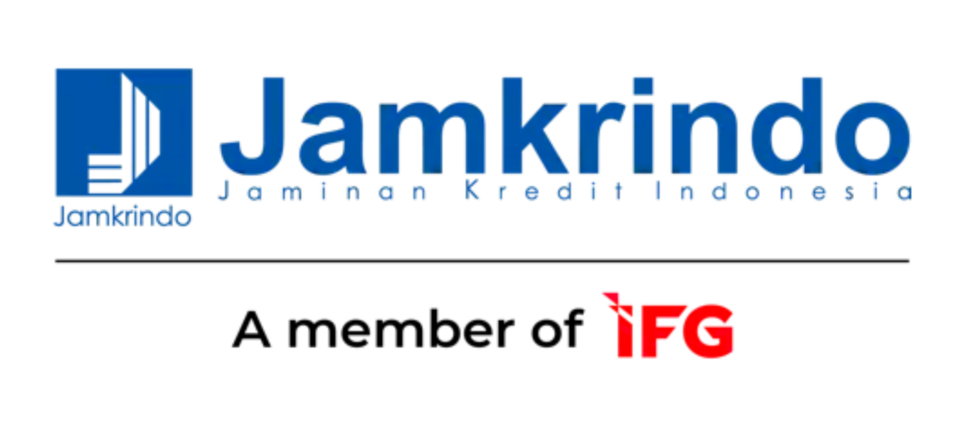

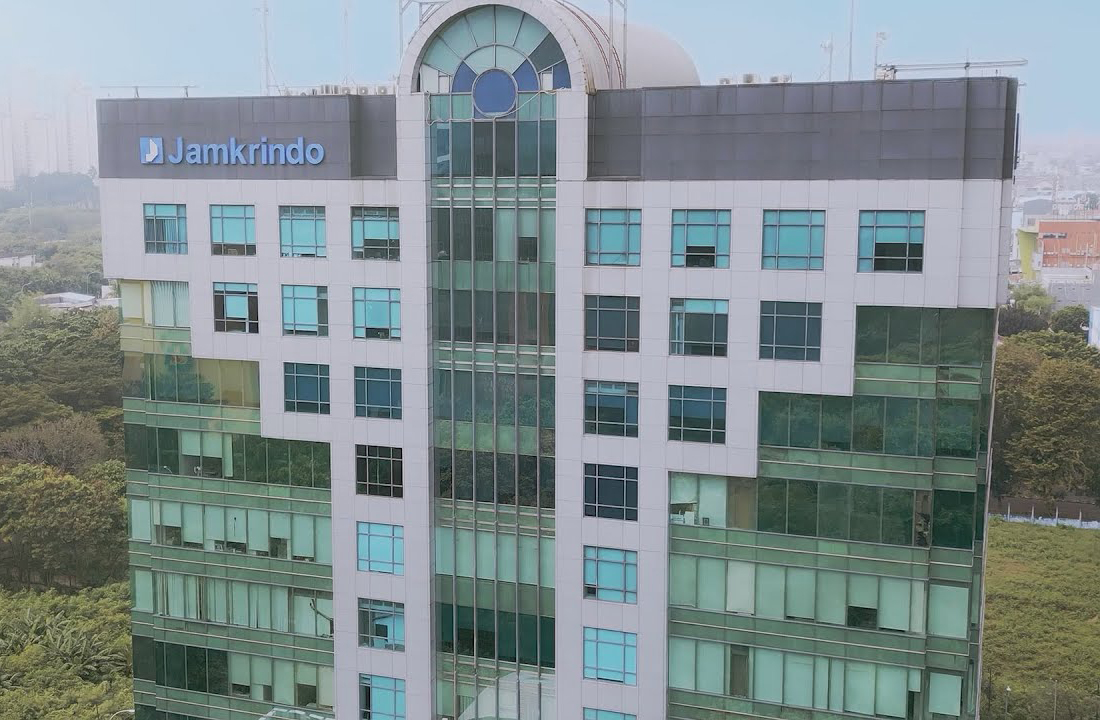
- Jamkrindo headquarters in Jakarta
- Type: State-owned subsidiary
- Industry: Finance
- Founded: 1970; 56 years ago
- Headquarters: Kemayoran, Central Jakarta, Jakarta, Indonesia
- Area served: Indonesia
- Key people: Krisna Wijaya; (President Commissioner); Hernita Alius; (Independent Commissioner); Ari Wahyuni; (Commissioner); Muhammad Muchlas Rowi; (Independent Commissioner); Angger P. Yuwono; (Commissioner); Suwarsito; (Operations and Network Director); Achmad Ivan Sutrisna Soeparno; (Director of HRM, General Affairs and Risk Management); Abdul Bari; (Director of Institutional and Services); Alia Nur Fitri; (Director of Finance and Investment)
- Products: CreditGuarantee; Surety Bond
- Owner: Indonesia Financial Group (Government of Indonesia)
- Website: www.jamkrindo.co.id

PT Jaminan Kredit Indonesia (Jamkrindo) is a part of one of Indonesia's state-owned enterprises and is a component of PT Bahana Pembinaan Usaha Indonesia (Indonesia Financial Group), operating in the field of credit guarantee, both conventional and sharia. It is the only state-owned enterprise tasked with providing guarantees.

== History ==
In 1970, the Indonesian government established the Cooperative Credit Guarantee Institution (LJKK) at a time when cooperatives were still lagging behind state-owned and private enterprises. At that time, LJKK provided limited guarantee services, namely for the TRI Program credit guarantee, Padi Palawija credit, and Fertilizer Procurement credit.

In its development, LJKK transformed into the Public Company for Cooperative Financial Development (Perum PKK) to expand its service coverage. It no longer focused solely on cooperatives but extended its services to micro, small, and medium enterprises (MSMEs). This change was established through Government Regulation No. 51 of 1981, which was later refined by Government Regulation No. 27 of 1985.

In 2000, Perum PKK underwent another transformation into Perum SPU (Business Development Facility) through Government Regulation No. 95 of 2000. This transformation aimed to realize guarantee activities covering bank or non-bank credits, guarantees for leasing financing, factoring, consumer financing, profit-sharing financing, installment purchases, service contract transactions, profit-sharing guarantee issuance, management and consulting assistance, surety bond issuance, and other guarantee activities.

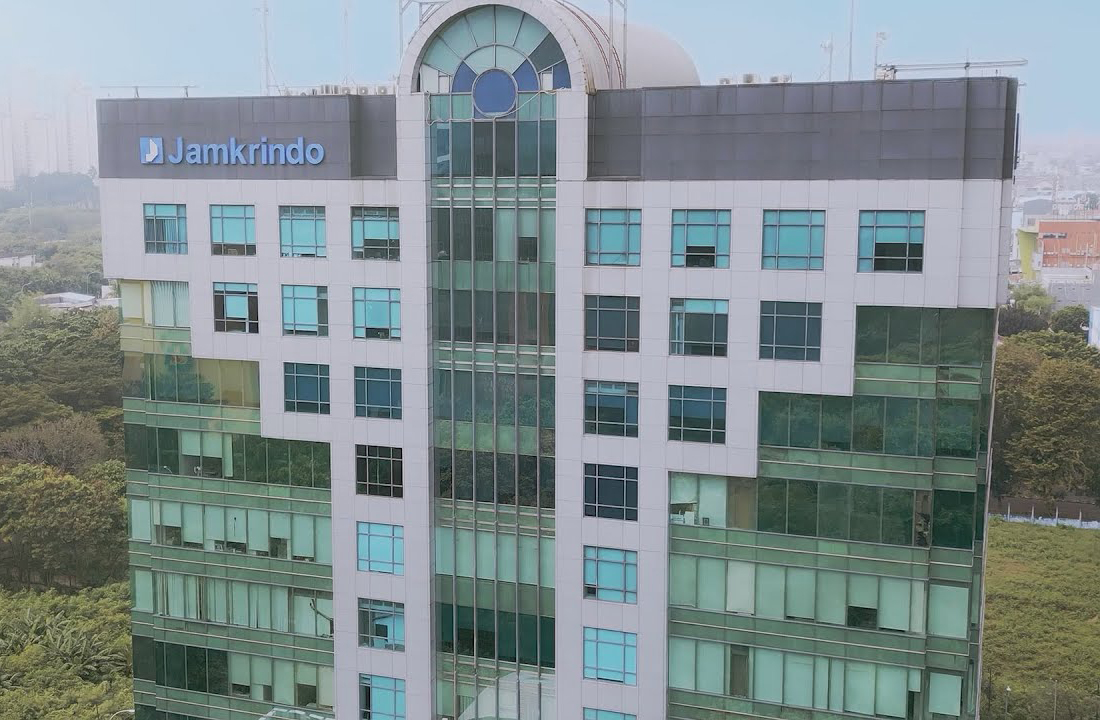
Jamkrindo Building in Jakarta, Indonesia

In 2008, with the issuance of Government Regulation No. 41 of 2008, Perum SPU changed its name to Perum Jaminan Kredit Indonesia (Perum Jamkrindo). This change was made because it no longer provided direct guarantees to MSMEs through profit-sharing schemes but focused on MSME credit guarantee businesses. Subsequently, in the same year, the government issued Presidential Regulation No. 2 of 2008 regarding Guarantee Institutions and Minister of Finance Regulation No. 222/PMK.010/2008 regarding Credit Guarantee Companies and Credit Re-Guarantee Companies, which positioned Perum Jamkrindo as a company required to obtain a business license as a credit guarantee company. Then, through Minister of Finance Decision No. KEP-77/KM.10/2009, Perum Jamkrindo's business license as a credit guarantee company was determined.

In 2020, President Joko Widodo changed the legal entity of Perum Jamkrindo to a limited liability company. This change was established through Government Regulation No. 11 of 2020 concerning the Change of Legal Entity Form of the Public Company (Perum) Jaminan Kredit Indonesia into a Limited Liability Company (Persero). This transformation was made to meet the requirements for entry into the insurance and guarantee holding company and as a business consideration to enable strategic decisions to be made more quickly compared to when it was still in the form of a Public Company.

In April 2020, Minister of State-Owned Enterprises Erick Thohir appointed PT Bahana Pembinaan Usaha Indonesia (Bahana) as the parent company (holding) for state-owned insurance and guarantee companies. The establishment of this holding company was enacted through Government Regulation No. 20 of 2020 concerning the Addition of State Capital Participation of the Republic of Indonesia into the Equity of the Limited Liability Company (Persero) PT Bahana Pembinaan Usaha Indonesia, signed by President Joko Widodo on March 16, 2020. Under this legal framework, PT Jamkrindo officially came under the umbrella of Bahana.
