= James Yabe =

Japanese kareteka

- Born: 1941 (age 84–85)
- Style: Shotokan Karate
- Teacher: Hidetaka Nishiyama
- Rank: 8th dan

James Yabe is a Japanese-American martial arts instructor, and author. One of the oldest students of Hidetaka Nishiyama starting in 1961, Yabe is considered one of the great instructors of Japanese traditional Shotokan Karate.

== Martial arts training ==
He was born in a relocation camp in the United States in November 1941. As a child the Yabe family moved to Japan after World War II, returning to Los Angeles, California, at the age of 13. He attended Jordan High School in Los Angeles. In 1958 he started Shotokan Karate with Tsutomu Ohshima and in 1961 started his training with Hidetaka Nishiyama, becoming one of Nishiyama Sensei's most senior students.

Yabe was the combined champion of the 1st All America Karate Tournament in 1961 while still a brown belt. In 1962, 1963, 1966 and 1967, Yabe added victories in the All America Karate Tournament competition. He was a member of the US National Team at the WUKO World Championships in 1970 in Tokyo and at the 2nd WUKO World Championships in 1972 in Paris.

Yabe attended UCLA and received his bachelor's degree in Engineering. While doing his undergraduate work, he became the instructor of the Shotokan Karate Club at UCLA. In his college years he entered the 7th JKA National Championship representing the United States. During his time in Japan he trained under instructors such as Kanazawa sensei, Yaguchi sensei, Enoeda sensei, and Shirai sensei.

== Training in Japan ==
From 1972 to 1976 Yabe left the United States to train in Japan. During this time he received his instructors credential from the JKA. When in Japan he also studied Iaidō, the art of sword fighting. When he returned to the United States in 1976, Yabe started a karate class at the Gardena Buddhist Church as a part of the Japanese Language School. He also taught at UCLA and was an assistant instructor at LA Central Dojo.

== Reputation ==
Yabe's reputation has spread worldwide due to his technical expertise, his skill and his style of instruction. He is noted among fellow instructors for his ability to guide students with a strong technical understanding, dynamic movement and the cultivation of a strong Karate spirit.

Sensei Yabe continues to instruct in the Los Angeles South Bay Area and teaches seminars and courses around the U.S. and abroad. He is known for his DVDs concerning traditional karate.

In December 1961 the AAKF ( American Amateur Karate Federation) held its first competition in Los Angeles at the Olympic Auditorium. With only a few years of training Yabe won both the kata and kumite fields.
