= Shotokan Karate of America =

Karate organization

- Abbreviation: SKA
- Formation: 1959
- Type: Non-profit organization
- Headquarters: 222 S. Hewitt Street; Los Angeles, CA 90012; USA
- Official language: English, Japanese
- Shihan: John Teramoto
- Website: ska.org

Shotokan Karate of America (SKA) is a non-profit organization in the United States dedicated to teaching traditional karate-do. It was established by Tsutomu Ohshima, a direct student of Gichin Funakoshi, the founder of Shotokan karate. Ohshima is also recognized as the founder of several other Shotokan organizations affiliated with SKA globally. The national headquarters of SKA is located in Los Angeles.

== History ==
Ohshima (born 1930) began his karate training at the Waseda University club in 1948, having already practiced sumo, kendo, and judo during his childhood. At that time, Funakoshi, then in his early 80s, continued teaching at Waseda and other universities. Notable seniors at Waseda included Noguchi, Egami, Kamata-Watanabe, Okuyama, and Shibuya. Ohshima became the club's captain in 1952. In 1955, he moved to the University of Southern California for further studies and subsequently conducted his first karate practice in the United States. In 1957, he established the first university karate club at Caltech, and in 1959, he founded the Southern California Karate Association. As the organization expanded with the opening of additional dojos in California and across the U.S., it was renamed Shotokan Karate of America in 1969. In 2018, Ohshima officially retired as the shihan (head instructor) of SKA at the age of 88, with John Teramoto serving as the current SKA shihan.

== Special Training ==
SKA organizes biannual regional events called "Special Trainings" (or Tokubetsu kunren in Japanese), typically held in winter and summer. These events consist of a series of intensive practice sessions conducted over a short period. Special training is considered a vital component of SKA's training methodology, as Ohshima emphasizes: "I hope that all Shotokan members will attend at least one special training because this is the essence of traditional martial arts practice." One rule during Special Training is that participants are not allowed to leave until the event concludes officially; departing early without the chief instructor's permission results in automatic expulsion from SKA.

== Ranking ==
SKA follows the ranking system established by Gichin Funakoshi, consisting of eight kyu ranks and five dan ranks. In contrast to many other karate organizations, SKA does not have ranks beyond godan (5th dan), a rank awarded to Tsutomu Ohshima by Funakoshi in 1957. Achieving the godan rank signifies the highest honor ever granted by Gichin Funakoshi. This rank is only granted to individuals who showcase exceptional skill and dedicate several decades to practice and teaching.

== Dojos ==
SKA offers a comprehensive list of SKA-affiliated dojos in the United States on its official website. Tsutomu Ohshima is recognized as the chief instructor for various SKA affiliates outside the United States, which include:

- Belgium Shotokan
- Canada Shotokan
- Curacao (operating as Shotokan Karate of Curacao)
- France Shotokan
- Gabon
- Germany Shotokan
- Greece Shotokan
- Israel Shotokan
- Japan (recognized as Shotokan Oshima Dojo Japan)
- Morocco
- Spain Shotokan
- Switzerland Shotokan

Additionally, there are extra SKA-affiliated dojos located in Ethiopia, Hong Kong, the Netherlands, Poland, and the United Kingdom.
