= Keigo Abe =

Japanese karateka (1938–2019)

- Abe in an undated photo
- Born: October 28, 1938; Iyoshi, Ehime Prefecture, Japan
- Died: December 21, 2019 (aged 81)
- Style: Shotokan Karate, Iaido
- Teacher: Masatoshi Nakayama
- Rank: 9th dan karate

Other information
- Website: http://www.jskajp.org/

Keigo Abe (October 28, 1938 – December 21, 2019) was a Japanese master of Shotokan karate who founded the Japan Shotokan Karate Association in 1999 and is its Chief Instructor. He held the rank of 9th dan in karate, was a direct student of Masatoshi Nakayama (1913–1987), and was a senior instructor in the Japan Karate Association.

== Early life ==
Abe was born on October 28, 1938, in the town of Iyoshi, Ehime Prefecture (on the island of Shikoku), Japan. Abe's ancestors included samurai; he has told of an incident from the past where two thieves had entered his family home, saying, "My family killed them; the two graves are still standing near my house." In 1953, aged 15 years, he began training in the martial arts of karate and judo. He initially began studying the Shito-ryu style of karate.

In 1956, Abe entered the Nihon University in Tokyo, studying engineering, and graduated four years later. He began training at the honbu dojo (headquarters training hall) of the Japan Karate Association (JKA) in 1958 under Masatoshi Nakayama. In an interview in 2000, he said, "Nakayama Sensei was very serious. He trained us very hard and always encouraged us to not only train hard, but to intellectually study what we were training. He stressed understanding ourselves and being good human beings."

== Karate career ==
In 1961, Abe fought a notable tournament match against Keinosuke Enoeda, losing by decision after six extensions. He graduated from the JKA instructors' training program in 1965, and was a long-serving member of the instructing team at JKA's honbu dojo. Like other kenshusei (junior instructors) of the day, Abe would practice his techniques on the streets against local gangsters to improve his fighting skills. Through Nakayama, Abe worked on the James Bond film You Only Live Twice (1967). Nakayama had been invited to appear in the movie, but was unable to do so due to prior commitments, and so recommended Abe instead.

Nakayama wrote that Abe's strengths were his backfist technique and his use of distancing, strengths also noted by others years later. He had an accomplished record as a karate tournament competitor, taking first place in the inaugural JKA National Championship, first place in the team competition at the 1973 JKA International Friendship Tournament, and first place in the second and third Japan Karatedo Federation National Championships (representing Tokyo).

Abe had a close working relationship with Nakayama, benefiting from his technical knowledge and assisting him with teaching. He was one of several instructors who demonstrated techniques in Nakayama's books on karate. In 1985, two years before Nakayama's death, Abe was appointed as Director of Qualifications in the JKA. After the division of the JKA in 1990, he became the Technical Director of the JKA (Matsuno faction). He was responsible for formulating the ippon shobu tournament rules, which are used by most Shotokan karate competitors today.

== Later life ==
Abe resigned from the JKA (Matsuno faction) on January 31, 1999. On February 10, 1999, he formed his own organization, the Japan Shotokan Karate Association (JSKA). When asked about his organization in 2000, he said, "Unlike most leaders of Karate organizations, I do not want my organization to grow very large. Very large organizations mean very large problems. I want a smaller organization where I can be an active part of everyone’s life and a high degree of quality can be maintained."

Regarding training in multiple martial arts, Abe has said, "In the old days the Bushi (warriors) would train in maybe 18 different arts out of battlefield necessity ... yes I would recommend cross-training." Apart from karate, he has also practiced iaido for more than 30 years, and also teaches this martial art. In his 60s, he was still training four or five mornings each week, involving karate practice and weight training, as well as teaching karate in Tokyo. Abe visited Australia in January 2008 and Cyprus in May 2009.

In 2010, Abe is due to teach in several European countries, most notably at the 5th JSKA World Karate Championship in Portugal, as well as visiting Sweden, Estonia, India, Iran, Israel, Mexico, and the United States of America. Abe died on December 21, 2019, at the age of 81 and was awarded a posthumous 10th dan from the JSKA Shihankai .

== See also ==
- List of Shotokan organizations
