= Tsutomu Ohshima =

Japanese karateka (born 1930)

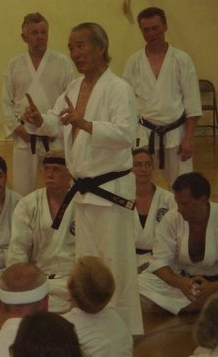
- Ohshima teaching at the 50th anniversary of the Caltech Karate Club on September 2, 2007
- Born: August 6, 1930 (age 96); Qingdao, China
- Other names: Tsutomu Oshima
- Style: Shotokan karate
- Teachers: Gichin Funakoshi, Hiroshi Noguchi, Shigeru Egami, Toshio Kamata-Watanabe, Tadao Okuyama, Matsuo Shibuya
- Rank: 5th dan karate (SKA)

Other information
- Website: http://www.ska.org/

Tsutomu Ohshima (大島 劼, Ōshima Tsutomu; born August 6, 1930)^{[a]} is a prominent Japanese master of Shotokan karate who founded the organization Shotokan Karate of America (SKA). He is the Shihan (Chief Instructor) of the SKA, and to this day holds the rank of 5th dan, which was awarded to him by Gichin Funakoshi. Ohshima's branch of the Shotokan world has become known as “Shotokan Ohshima Karate-do.”

== Early life ==
Ohshima was born on August 6, 1930, in Qingdao, China. His family moved back to Japan just before the outbreak of World War II. By the age of five, he had already begun learning martial arts. He studied sumo from the ages of 5–15, kendo from 8–15, and judo from 9–13. Recalling an episode from his youth, Ohshima said, "One day I was going to Tokyo. This group was beating one young student because he was a quiet boy, but something he pushed with his elbow. And this was a ridiculous reason. But these guys were beating this young boy - same age as me, fifteen or sixteen. I got so mad. Mad, because person next to me said, 'Don't go, you get beat up.' I was ashamed of myself. I knew this was injustice. Why couldn't I put myself out there? I could be beaten up, but I could stand it. But I just sit there and overlook. I say to myself, 'Alas, how I am a coward guy.' I knew somebody was getting beaten up, but I couldn't help him. Therefore, when I was practicing karate, every time I asked myself, 'Are you ready to put yourself into something that you believe is justice?'" (p. 34).

== Karate career ==
Ohshima began studying karate in 1948, while a student at Waseda University. There, he trained under Shotokan's founder, Gichin Funakoshi, and later became captain of the university's karate club in 1952. That same year, Funakoshi personally awarded Ohshima the rank of 3rd dan black belt. Ohshima's seniors at the club also influenced his development in karate; they included Shigeru Egami, Toshio Kamata-Watanabe, Hiroshi Noguchi, Tadao Okuyama, and Matsuo Shibuya. It was also during this period that he befriended Mitsusuke Harada, who would go on to become a pioneer of karate in Brazil and the United Kingdom.

In 1955, Ohshima travelled from Japan to the United States of America to continue his tertiary studies in economics at the University of Southern California. In 1957, he founded the first university karate club in the US at the California Institute of Technology (Caltech). That same year, Funakoshi promoted Ohshima to 5th dan - the highest rank awarded by Funakoshi, and the highest rank in the SKA system to this day. In 1959, he founded the Southern California Karate Association (SCKA).

It was around this time that Ohshima invited Hidetaka Nishiyama to take charge of his karate students in the US, as he was planning to return to Japan following completion of his US university studies. The arrangement did not work out satisfactorily, and was to be a source of bitterness between the two masters. In the end, unhappy with Nishiyama's actions and the direction being taken, Ohshima settled in the US and continued teaching there. Following the SCKA's growth across the US, it was renamed Shotokan Karate of America in 1969. Black Belt magazine selected Ohshima as its Japanese Instructor of the Year in 1968.

During the mid-1970s, Ohshima lived near Griffith Observatory in Los Angeles. His main occupation at this time was teaching physical education as a member of the faculty at Caltech. Ohshima has written two books on karate - Shotokan Karate of America: The first twenty years (1977) and Notes on training (1998) - and also translated Funakoshi's Karate-do Kyo-han (1973) into English. He also demonstrated the nineteen Shotokan kata for Funakoshi's book. In 1980, Black Belt magazine announced Ohshima as the inaugural recipient of its Publisher's Award. The award recognized "the role he has played in the development of karate in the United States and the world over" (p. 63).

== Later life ==
In 1988, the Caltech Alumni Association bestowed an honorary membership on Ohshima for his contributions to the Caltech community. In 1993/1994, he received a teaching award from Caltech's undergraduate student organization. Ohshima retired from Caltech in 1994, after 37 years as a staff member. On May 22, 1994, around one hundred Caltech alumni assembled in the institution's gymnasium to honour Ohshima on the occasion of his retirement. In 2000, SKA opened "Shotokan Ohshima Dojo" in Santa Barbara, California, where Ohshima had moved his residence to.

Apart from being the SKA's Shihan, he holds a similar position in Canada Shotokan Karate and other affiliated organizations. Ohshima is an advisory board member of Waseda Tomonkai Karate Club. Ohshima officially retired as Shihan in August, 2018 when, at the age of 88, he appointed his successors in SKA and affiliated organizations.

== See also ==
- List of Shotokan organizations

== Notes ==
a. Ohshima's surname is sometimes also spelled as Oshima, such as in the article by Sulak (1975).
