= International Traditional Karate Federation =

International governing body for Traditional Karate

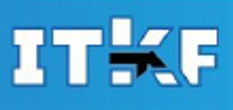
- Formation: 1974
- Type: Sports martial art association
- Legal status: Federation
- Purpose: Development of Traditional Karate Worldwide
- Headquarters: Curitiba, Brazil
- Location: Brazil
- Region served: Worldwide
- Chairman: Gilberto Gaertner
- Main organ: Brazil office & administration
- Website: www.itkf.global
- Remarks: Founder - H. Nishiyama

The International Traditional Karate Federation (国際伝統空手連盟, Kokusai Dentō Karate Renmei) or ITKF is the international governing body for Traditional Karate. This organisation was founded by Hidetaka Nishiyama. In the early 1990s, Nishiyama's refusal to align his ITKF organization with the World Union of Karate-Do Organizations (WUKO) caused the International Olympic Committee to suspend its recognition of WUKO as amateur karate's international governing body. According to the IOC decision 101 from 1993 the ITKF and WUKO had been due to merge and form a unified karate organization under the IOC suggested name of WKF. The IOC further indicated its intention to recognize the merged WKF should ITKF and WUKO successfully fulfill the IOC 101 decision guidelines, but this did not eventuate. The WUKO eventually became the World Union of Karate-Do Federations in late 2008.

== ITKF Officials ==
- Chairman: Prof. Gilberto Gaertner
- President: Rômulo Valdemar Ribeiro Machado
- Vice President: Sandrine El Marhomy
- Board of Directors: Antonio Walger, Roman Pavlovic, Fernando Silva, Ramy El Mekawy, Ibrahim Al Bakr.
- General Secretary: Luiz Alberto Küster
- Treasurer: Rui Francisco Martins Marçal
- Director General: Sadiomar Santos
- Technical Committee: Sensei Tasuke Watanabe (in memoriam), Sensei Gilberto Gaertner, Sensei Eligio Contareli, Sensei Justo Gomez
- Communications & Marketing Committee: Eyal Nir, Roman Pavlovic, Ibrahim Al-Bakr, Leonardo Neves Berg do Prado,
- Innovation and Technology Committee: Vinícius Sant’Anna Pinto, Joarez Evangelista Franco Junior, Rafael Gustavo Gaertner, Sheriff Abuel Enein

== Member Organizations ==
The ITKF is composed of Member Organizations established voluntarily and democratically in their own countries as governing body of Traditional Karate.

=== PAN AMERICA ===
Country	Federation	City	Chief Executive
MEXICO	ITKF MEXICO	Naucalpan de Juarez	Alfredo Igor Arguello Hermida
USA	UNITED STATES OF AMERICA TRADITIONAL KARATE FEDERATION	Wylie	Brad Webb
=== AFRICA ===
Country	Federation	City	Chief Executive
ALGERIA	ALGERIA TRADITIONAL KARATE ASSOCIATION	Algeria	Kadir Bouguettaya
CONGO	CONGO RDC		Moussa Djuma Moise
EGYPT	EGYPTIAN TRADITIONAL KARATE FEDERATION	Cairo	Ramy El Mekawy
GAMBIA	GTKA - GAMBIA TRADITIONAL KARATE ASSOCIATION		Muhamed Sarr
NIGERIA	NTKF		Hassan Abdullahi
SUDAN	SUDANESE TRADITIONAL KARATE FEDERATION		Jamal Guda
TANZANIA	TTKF		Muhammad Amin Suleiman
TUNISIA	ATKT	Tunis	Lotfi Ouertani
COMOROS	CTKC - COMOROS TRADITIONAL KARATE ASSOCIATION		Said Youssouf Said Mohamed
ANGOLA	NÚCLEO ANGOLANO DE KARATE TRADICIONAL	Lubango	Nzevuna Fidel André
=== ASIA ===
Country	Federation	City	Chief Executive
INDIA	NATIONAL KARATE FEDERATION	New Delhi	Jitesh Kumar
INDONESIA	INATKF	Jakarta	Muhammad Muchlas Rowi
KUWAIT	KUTKC - KUWAIT UNION AND TRADITIONAL KARATE COMMITTEE	Kuwait	Ahmed Hassan Alkhlefe
PAKISTAN	PAKISTAN TRADITIONAL KARATE FEDERATION	Quetta	Jalal-Ud-Din
PALESTINE	PTKF	Jerusalem	Ibahem Abukaf
UZBEKISTAN	UZBEKISTAN ITKF KARATE-DO FEDERATION	Tashkent	Shukhatjon Kushmuradov
SRI LANKA	SRI LANKA TRADITIONAL KARATE DO FEDERATION - NEKO DO GOJU	Henegama Gampaha	Jeewantha Kariyawasam
REPUBLIC OF ARMENIA	CENTRE NATIONAL TRADITIONAL KARATE-DO FEDERATION OF	Yerevan	Suren Matevosyan
KAZAKHSTAN	WESTERN KAZAKHSTAN ASSOCIATION OF KARATE-DO BUDO	Uralsk	Kuangaliyev Taras
BANGLADESH	BANGLADESH TRADITIONAL KARATE FEDERATION	Dhaka	H. M. Nuruddin Chowdhury Rana
JORDAN	JKA JORDAN	Amman	Emad Khalil
AZERBAIJAN	AZERBAIJAN TRADITIONAL KARATE FEDERATION	Baku	Ayaz Ibishov
NEPAL	NEPAL WADO RYU KARATE DO	Kathmandu	Hari Sharan K.C
