= List of Shotokan organizations =

Shotokan karate organizations

Shotokan Karate is one of the most widely practiced martial arts in the world. Since its inception, many organizations of Shotokan Karate have been established globally, each with its own approach and philosophy.

The organizations are listed in order by year of establishment.

== Shōtōkai ==
Shōtōkai is the name of the association launched by Gichin Funakoshi originally in 1930. The name "Shotokan" is used as a synonym for the Shotokan ryu association, Dai Nihon Karate-do Shotokan.

Following Funakoshi's death in 1957, a rift developed among Funakoshi's students. The Shōtōkai Association and the Nihon Karate Kyokai (Japan Karate Association, JKA) became separate factions.

Although Shōtōkai is the name of a Shotokan Karate association, it has a defined practice method widely known as "Shōtōkai Karate" today. Master Shigeru Egami defined the broad outlines of the new way of practising that he developed after having, in a number of tests, thought and concluded there was some inefficiency of the karate method developed by other schools until that time.

== Kenkojuku Karate Association (KKA) ==
The Kenkojuku Karate Association was founded in 1942 by Tomosaburo Okano, a Japanese Iaido master and student of both Gichin Funakoshi and his son Yoshitaka (Gigo) Funakoshi. Sensei Koji Sugimoto is the current representative of the Japan Karate Federation for Shotokan Kenkojuku karate.

The association's motto is "Inner Strength with Outward Humility". Since master Okano's passing, the Kenkojuku Budokan Hombu Dojo is now run by his son Tomokatsu Okano, from the style's Hombu dojo located in Tokyo. Kenkojuku karate has representatives in the United States, the Caribbean, India and Latin America.

== Japan Karate Association (JKA) ==
The Japan Karate Association (JKA; "Nihon Karate Kyokai" in Japan) was formed in 1949 by several senior students of Sensei Gichin Funakoshi, the founder of Shotokan Karate. Masatoshi Nakayama (1913–1987) led the JKA, with Gichin Funakoshi holding a position equivalent to professor emeritus.

JKA is the largest karate organization in the world, with members in over 100 countries. It is recognized for promoting the explosive and linear style of Shotokan karate, and for maintaining high technical standards.

== Shotokan Karate of America (SKA) ==
Tsutomu Ohshima (1930–) began practicing karate at the Waseda University club in 1948, receiving instruction from Funakoshi and Egami among others. In 1955, he moved to USC to continue his studies, and led his first U.S. practice soon afterwards. In 1957, he started the first university karate club in the United States, at Caltech, and in 1959 founded the Southern California Karate Association. As more dojos were opened throughout the U.S., the organization was renamed to Shotokan Karate of America (SKA) in 1969. SKA maintains its national headquarters in Los Angeles. Today, Ohshima is recognized as the chief instructor of many other SKA-affiliated Shotokan organizations worldwide. In 1957, Ohshima was awarded the rank of 5th dan by Master Funakoshi.

== International Traditional Karate Federation (ITKF) ==
Hidetaka Nishiyama (1928–2008) began his karate training in 1943 under Gichin Funakoshi. Two years later, while enrolled at Takushoku University, he became a member of the university's karate team. He was a co-founder of the All Japan Collegiate Karate Federation and was elected as its first chairman. In 1951, Nishiyama became a founding member of the JKA, and was elected to the JKA Board of Directors. Nishiyama came to the United States in 1961 and four months later founded the American Amateur Karate Federation (AAKF), as a branch of the JKA. In 1968, Nishiyama organized the first World Invitational Karate Tournament held in Los Angeles.

Following disagreements over organization during the 1st (1970) and 2nd (1973) World Karate Championships, the International Amateur Karate Federation (IAKF) was formed in 1974, with Nishiyama as executive director.

In 1985, the IAKF changed its name to the International Traditional Karate Federation (ITKF). Nishiyama obtained the 10th dan in 2003 from the International San Ten Karate Association. He died on November 7, 2008.

== International Shotokan Karate Federation (ISKF) ==
Teruyuki Okazaki (1931–2020), 10th dan, leads the International Shotokan Karate Federation (ISKF), a large Shotokan karate organization in North America, South America and the Caribbean. Okazaki studied under Gichin Funakoshi and Masatoshi Nakayama, and was integral in the founding of the JKA Instructor Trainee program. As part of an effort by Nakayama to spread Shotokan karate internationally, Okazaki came to the United States in 1961. Okazaki founded the ISKF in 1977 and it was part of the JKA until June 2007.

== Shotokan Karate-Do International Federation (SKIF) ==
Hirokazu Kanazawa (1931–2019), 10th dan, broke away from the JKA in 1978, and called his organization Shotokan Karate-do International Federation (SKIF). Kanazawa had studied under Masatoshi Nakayama and Hidetaka Nishiyama, both students of Gichin Funakoshi. SKIF introduced elements of tai chi, particularly in the matter of flow and balance, and actively promoted the evolution of Shotokan while maintaining the traditional core of the art. Kanazawa was awarded 10th Dan in 2000.

== Funakoshi Shotokan Karate Association (FSKA) ==
The Funakoshi Shotokan Karate Association (FSKA) was founded by Kenneth Funakoshi in 1987. The headquarters is located in Milpitas, California, and there are affiliates located throughout the United States, Mexico, Europe, Africa, Middle East and South America.

In 1960, Funakoshi started his Shotokan training at the Karate Association of Hawaii. For three years, he trained under Japan Karate Association (JKA) senior instructor, Masataka Mori. From 1966 to 1969, he trained under former JKA grand champion from Japan, Tetsuhiko Asai.

In 1969, Funakoshi was appointed as the Chief Instructor for the Karate Association of Hawaii. He remained in that position until his move to San Jose, CA in December 1986. He founded the FSKA the following year.

Kenneth Funakoshi is a distant relative to Master Gichin Funakoshi, the founder of Shotokan.

== Japan Karate Shotorenmei (JKS) ==
Tetsuhiko Asai (1935–2006), 10th dan, often practiced Sumo, Judo, Kendo, and the Spear in his youth. Asai studied at the Takushoku University in Tokyo, where he also studied Shotokan karate. He joined the instructors' program and became a JKA instructor. In later years, Asai instructed in China, Hong Kong, America, Europe, and Hawaii (where he led the Hawaiian Karate Association). Asai was made Chief Instructor of the JKA after Masatoshi Nakayama's death in 1987; however, he—along with a number of other senior JKA instructors—opposed the appointment of Nakahara as chairman, and so formed a separate JKA (Matsuno Section).

Following a lengthy legal battle, the Nakahara group won the rights to the JKA title and Asai's group adopted the name of the Japan Karate Shotorenmei (JKS).

== World Shotokan Karate-Do Association (WSKA) ==
The World Shotokan Karate-Do Association (WSKA) was formed in Ferrara, Italy in 1990. WSKA formed after the creation of the European Shotokan Karate-Do Association (ESKA) which was formed in 1986 in Ghent, Belgium. WSKA covers five regions of the world: America, Africa, Asia, Europe and Oceania.

WSKA World Championship tournaments are held every two years at the beginning of September. ESKA European Championship tournaments are also held every other two years.

== International Japan Karate-Do Association (IJKA) ==
The IJKA was formed in 1990 with Tetsuhiko Asai Shihan (1935–2006) as World Chief Instructor and Sadashige Kato Shihan (1943–2020) as European Chief Instructor. Its headquarters is situated in Tokyo, Japan, though its main activities are primarily based in Europe.

== Japan Shotokan Karate Association (JSKA) ==
Keigo Abe (1938–), as a student at the JKA Honbu, learned directly from Nakayama. He was a former senior instructor at the JKA Honbu, having graduated from the instructors' program. He held the office of Director of Qualifications in the original, pre-split JKA. However, after the split in 1990, he became the Technical Director of the JKA (Matsuno Section).

Abe retired from the JKA in 1999 to form his own international organization—the Japan Shotokan Karate Association (JSKA). Abe is supported in the JSKA by Makoto Matsunami 8th dan, who runs his own independent dojo in Japan, as Technical Director and Takashi Naito 6th dan, as Director of Administration.

== Shotokan Karate-Do International Association (SKDIA) ==
Masanobu Nihei Shihan, 9th dan, founded the Shotokan Karate-Do International Association in 2010 with the goal of preserving the teachings of Gichin Funakoshi Sensei and original Shotokan Karate techniques. SKDIA places great importance on bunkai, which involves the practical applications of kata, and full contact kumite is also an integral part of training. Headquartered in Japan, SKDIA currently has members in 35 countries.

== International Shotokanryu Karate Association (ISKA) ==
Masahiro Motomura, 10th dan & Shihan Shiv K. Panchal, 7th Dan, founded the International Shotokanryu Karate Association in 2024 with the goal of preserving the teachings of Gichin Funakoshi Sensei and original Shotokan Karate techniques. ISKA is headquartered in California, USA.
