= Ryōsei =

- Gender: Male

Origin
- Origin: Japanese
- Meaning: Different meanings depending on the kanji used

Ryōsei, Ryosei or Ryousei (written: 遼生, 亮正 or 良生) is a masculine Japanese given name. Notable people with the name include:

- Ryosei Akazawa (赤沢 亮正; born 1960), Japanese politician
- Ryosei Kobayashi (born 1994), Japanese squash player
- Ryosei Konishi (小西 遼生; born 1982), Japanese actor and voice actor
- Ryosei Tanaka (田中 良生; born 1963), Japanese politician
