= Yoshitaka =

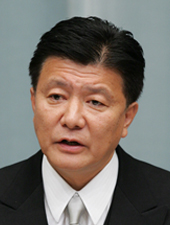
- Yoshitaka Shindo, Japanese politician
- Pronunciation: joɕitaka (IPA)
- Gender: Male

Origin
- Origin: Japanese
- Meaning: Different meanings depending on the kanji used

Other names
- Alternative spelling: Yositaka (Kunrei-shiki) Yositaka (Nihon-shiki) Yoshitaka (Hepburn)

Yoshitaka is a masculine Japanese given name and a Japanese surname.

== Written forms ==
Yoshitaka can be written using many different combinations of kanji characters. Here are some examples:

- 義孝, "justice, filial piety"
- 義隆, "justice, noble"
- 義貴, "justice, precious"
- 義高, "justice, tall"
- 吉孝, "good luck, filial piety"
- 吉隆, "good luck, noble"
- 吉貴, "good luck, precious"
- 吉高, "good luck, tall"
- 善孝, "virtuous, filial piety"
- 善隆, "virtuous, noble"
- 善貴, "virtuous, precious"
- 善高, "virtuous, tall"
- 芳孝, "fragrant/virtuous, filial piety"
- 芳隆, "fragrant/virtuous, noble"
- 芳貴, "fragrant/virtuous, precious"
- 芳高, "fragrant/virtuous, tall"
- 好孝, "good/like something, filial piety"
- 喜孝, "rejoice, filial piety"
- 喜隆, "rejoice, noble"
- 慶隆, "congratulate, noble"
- 由貴, "reason, precious"
- 由高, "reason, tall"

The name can also be written in hiragana よしたか or katakana ヨシタカ.

== Notable people with the given name Yoshitaka ==
- Yositaka Adachi (born 1962), Palauan politician
- Yoshitaka Amano (天野 喜孝; born 1952), Japanese artist
- Yoshitaka Egawa (江川 嘉孝; born 1942), Japanese basketball player
- Yoshitaka Fujii (藤井 善隆), Japanese anesthesiologist
- Yoshitaka Fujisaki (藤崎 義孝; born 1975), Japanese footballer
- Yoshitaka Fukuda (福田 吉孝; born 1948), Japanese businessman
- Yoshitaka Hatakeyama (畠山 義隆; died 1576), Japanese daimyō
- Yoshitaka Hirota (弘田 佳孝; born 1971), Japanese video game composer and bass guitarist
- Yoshitaka Hoshino (星野 良生; born 1988), Japanese shogi player
- Yoshitaka Iwamizu (岩水 嘉孝; born 1979), Japanese long-distance runner
- Yoshitaka Kageyama (影山 由高; born 1978), Japanese footballer
- Yoshitaka Komori (小森 由貴; born 1987), Japanese footballer
- Yoshitaka Kuki (九鬼 嘉隆; 1542–1600), Japanese samurai
- Yoshitaka Kuroda (黒田 孝高; 1546–1604), Japanese daimyō
- Yoshitaka Mizuo (水尾 嘉孝; born 1968), Japanese baseball player
- Yoshitaka Murata (村田 吉隆; born 1944), Japanese politician
- Yoshitaka Murayama (村山 吉隆), Japanese video game designer
- Yoshitaka Muroya (室矢 芳隆; born 1930), Japanese middle-distance runner
- Yoshitaka Ouchi (大内 義隆; 1507-1551), Japanese daimyō
- Yoshitaka Nishimura (西村 宜隆; born 1982), Japanese video game composer
- Yoshitaka Sakurada (桜田 義孝; born 1949), Japanese politician
- Yoshitaka Shindo (新藤 義孝; born 1958), Japanese politician
- Yoshitaka Tamba (丹波 義隆; born 1955), Japanese actor
- Yoshitaka Tokunaga (德永 祥尭; born 1992), Japanese rugby sevens player
- Yoshitaka Watanabe (渡辺 佳孝; born 1973), Japanese footballer
- Yoshitaka Yamamoto (山本 善隆; born 1951), Japanese golfer

== Notable people with the surname Yoshitaka ==
- Yukiharu Yoshitaka (吉鷹 幸春; born 1964), Japanese judoka
- Yuriko Yoshitaka (吉高 由里子; born 1988), Japanese actress

== Fictional Characters ==
- Yoshitaka Mine (峯 義孝), a character in the Like a Dragon series.
- Yoshitaka Moriyama (森山 由孝), a character in the manga series Kuroko's Basketball
- Yoshitaka Nakabayashi (中林 義貴), protagonist of the manga series He is my Master
- Yoshitaka Waya (和谷 義高), character in Hikaru no Go
