= Karin Prinsloo (karateka) =

South African Karateka and winner of the 2001 World Games, living in Australia

- Born: 1972 (age 53–54); Klerksdorp, South Africa
- Nationality: South African
- Division: Under 60kg
- Style: Karate; Shotokan (JKA)
- Fighting out of: Perth, Australia
- Team: Stirling Karate
- Rank: 7th Dan (World Ranking: 538th)

Other information
- University: RAU
- Website: Personal website

Karin Prinsloo (born 1972) is a South African karateka, gold medal winner of the 6th World Games (2001) in the under 60 kg Kumite category and Karate instructor formerly based in Durban, South Africa, now living in Perth, Australia. She is listed among the top Karate competitors of all time.

The World Games are an international multi-sport event first held in 1981 and organised and governed by the International World Games Association (IWGA) under the International Olympic Committee (IOC). The World Games are for sports that are not contested in the Olympic Games. The 6th World Games were held in 2001 in Akita, Japan.

Selection for the World Games involves either being placed within the top 8 sports persons in the world in a sport or winning the continental games. In Prinsloo's case she won the All-Africa Games. Prinsloo was the only South African representative of the sport of Karate to attend the 6th World Games.

In 2009 she was part of the national coaching staff for Team South Africa at the Commonwealth Karate Championships as well as in 2010 at the UFAK Africa Championships and Cape Town.

== Achievements ==
On 25 October 2008, Prinsloo graded to 6th Dan in the Japan Karate Association (JKA). She was graded by Masahiko Tanaka and Stan Schmidt. In September 2024, Prinsloo was graded to 7th Dan by the Japan Karate Association (JKA), in Tokyo, Japan.

In September 2024 she was graded by the Japan Karate Association a 7th DAN Black Belt and Level A Judge, Level B Examiner and Level A Instructor.

Prinsloo represented JKA South Africa at the following international JKA events:

- 1992: The 4th Shoto Cup, Tokyo, Japan: Ladies Open Kata, last 8 competitors.
- 1994: The 5th Shoto Cup, Philadelphia, USA.
- 1998: The 7th Shoto Cup, Paris, France: Ladies Individual kata, Bronze Medal
- 1999: Female World Cup, Sainte-Maxime, France: Gold medal - ladies kumite under 60 kg
- 2004: The 9th Shoto Cup, Tokyo, Japan: Silver - Team kumite, Bronze - Team kata
- 2006: 10th Funakoshi Gichin Cup World Karate-do Championship, Sydney, Australia: Silver - Team kata, Bronze - Team kumite
- 2008: Commonwealth Karate Championships, Edinburgh, Scotland: Bronze - individual ladies kumite under 60 kg, Silver - ladies team kumite

Prinsloo represented South Africa at the following WKF World Championships:

- 1994: Kota Kinabalu, Malaysia
- 1996: Sun City, South Africa
- 1998: Munich, Germany
- 2002: Madrid, Spain

Other achievements:

- 1995: Harare, Zimbabwe: Silver medal ladies kata
- 1999: Johannesburg, South Africa: Gold - ladies kumite under 60 kg, Gold - ladies team kata, Bronze - ladies kata
- 2003: Abuja, Nigeria: Silver - ladies kata, Silver - ladies under 60 kg kumite, Silver - ladies team kumite, Gold - ladies open kumite
- 2024: Takasaki, Japan: Gichin Funakoshi World Championships (JKA Karate World Championships), Ladies Veteran division, Gold Kumite and Bronze in Kata.

In the period 1991 to 2008, within South Africa Prinsloo has been SA JKA female open kata champion 12 times and open kumite champion 7 times and been ranked number one in open kata and kumite under 60 kg more than 10 times. In 2010, she attended the 14th WKF Africa Seniors Karate Championships (UFAK) in Cape Town, South Africa and the 1st JKA Africa Championships in Johannesburg in 2015.

== Selected media ==
- Tekki Shodan – Kata & Bunkai – Shotokan Kata – Karin Prinsloo on YouTube
- Heian Godan – Important Points and Bunkai by Karin Prinsloo on YouTube
- Children Karate Warm Ups on YouTube

== Personal life ==
Prinsloo was born in Klerksdorp and grew up in Heidelberg, South Africa. She started training in Karate in 1982. She studied at Rand Afrikaans University (RAU) and obtained a B.Com. (Sport Management) with major in Human Movement Studies. She followed that with a B.Com. Hons also from RAU. While at RAU she was awarded Sports Woman of the Year in 1992, 1994 and 1995.

In 1997 Prinsloo took ownership of a Karate school called Pinetown JKA Karate and in 2000 established Pinetown JKA Karate Institute. In 2018 Dylan Powell became head instructor at Pinetown JKA. Prinsloo is focussed on continuing to teach and learn karate.

Prinsloo is active on Facebook with a blog entitled Karin Prinsloo - Karate Blog - For the Love of Karate.

She is married with two children.

In 2018 Prinsloo emigrated to Perth, Australia.

== See also ==
- List of karateka
- Karate at the World Games
- World Karate Federation
- Stan Schmidt
