= Tetsuhiko Asai =

Japanese master of Shotokan karate

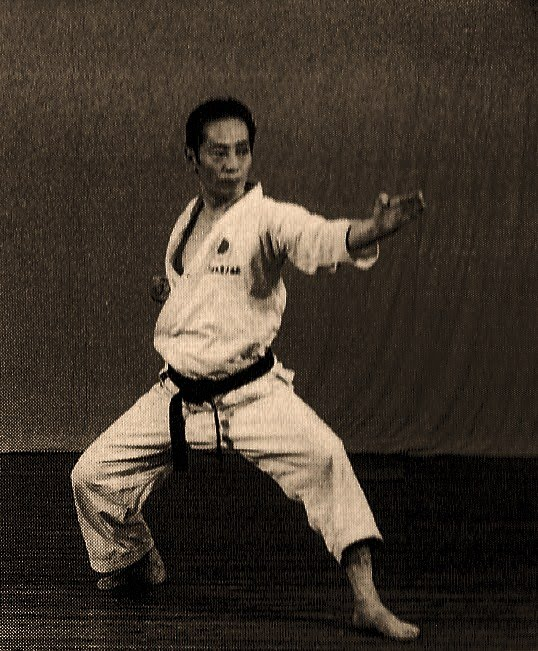
- Born: June 7, 1935; Ehime Prefecture, Japan
- Died: August 15, 2006 (aged 71); Japan; Liver cancer
- Style: Shotokan karate
- Teachers: Gichin Funakoshi, Masatoshi Nakayama, Teruyuki Okazaki
- Rank: 10th dan (JKS/IJKA)

Other information
- Spouse: Keiko Asai
- Children: 1
- Notable students: Sadamu Uriu, Soke Takeshi Kitagawa
- Website: http://www.jks.jp/ http://www.ijka.net/

Tetsuhiko Asai (浅井 哲彦, Asai Tetsuhiko; June 7, 1935 – August 15, 2006) was a prominent Japanese master of Shotokan karate of the Japan Karate Association (JKA), founder and Chief Instructor of the International Japan Martial Arts Karate Asai-ryu (IJKA), and founder of the Japan Karate Shoto Federation (JKS; formerly known as the Japan Karate Shoto-Renmei).

== Early life ==
Asai was born on June 7, 1935, in Ehime Prefecture (on the island of Shikoku), Japan. He was the eldest of seven children. As a boy, he trained in sumo. In addition, his father (a policeman) taught him judo, kendo, and sojutsu. When he was 12 years old, he witnessed a fight between a boxer and a karateka (practitioner of karate); the karate combatant was able to disable his opponent with a kick, and Asai was impressed.

== Karate career ==
In 1958, Asai graduated from Takushoku University, where he had trained in karate under Gichin Funakoshi, and Masatoshi Nakayama. He trained hard and was allowed to sleep in the karate dormitory. At Nakayama's recommendation, he entered the JKA instructor training program and graduated from the course three years later. Asai won the JKA championship in kumite (sparring) in 1961, and in kata (patterns) in 1963. He was overall JKA champion in 1961, having come first in kumite and second in kata that year. Asai became the first instructor to introduce karate to Taiwan. Through the second half of the 1960s, he taught karate in Hawaii for five years, with his students including Kenneth Funakoshi (a fourth cousin to Gichin Funakoshi).

Over the years, Asai advanced within the JKA, and was appointed as Technical Director. Following Nakayama's death, the JKA experienced political troubles and divided; Asai and colleagues (including Keigo Abe and Mikio Yahara) formed one group, while Nakahara Nobuyuki and colleagues formed another group—which in 1999 was officially recognized as the JKA. In 2000, he founded the International Japan Martial Arts Karate Asai-ryu and the Japan Karate Shoto-Renmei. Apart from the ranking of 9th dan in Shotokan karate, he also held the ranks of 3rd dan in jodo, 2nd dan in judo, 2nd dan in jukendo, and 2nd dan in kendo.

== Later life ==
Reflecting on relations between JKA instructors who had graduated from Takushoku University, Asai said, "we all pretty much get on nowadays, contrary to our official stances and federations. In saying that, some of us don't, but isn't that life? ... I am happy to say that most of the deep-rooted rivalry has gone amongst my peers. I think that the passing of Mr. Enoeda, Mr. Kase, Mr. Tabata and Mr. Shoji and so forth has brought many of us back to reality. Obviously, this is not limited to Takushoku University, it is all about us international karate pioneers getting very old."

Asai's health deteriorated with age, and he underwent liver surgery on February 10, 2006. He died at 2:50 PM on August 15, 2006, leaving behind his wife, Keiko Asai, and their daughter, Hoshimi Asai. More than 2,000 people attended his funeral, which was held on September 1, 2006, at Gokokuji Temple in Tokyo. Asai received the rank of 10th dan posthumously from the JKS, and was eventually succeeded as President of the IJKA by his widow (despite her not being a karate practitioner)

== See also ==
- List of Shotokan organizations
