= Teruyuki Okazaki =

Okinawan martial artist (1931–2020)

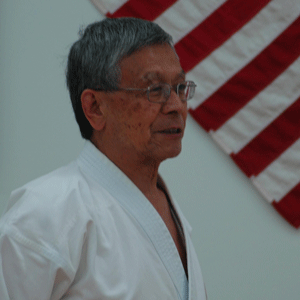
- Born: June 22, 1931; Fukuoka Prefecture, Japan
- Died: April 21, 2020 (aged 88); Philadelphia, Pennsylvania, U.S.
- Style: Shotokan
- Teachers: Gichin Funakoshi, Masatoshi Nakayama
- Rank: 10th dan karate

Other information
- Notable students: Hiroyoshi Okazaki 9th Dan Frank Woon-a-tai, Leslie B Safar
- Website: http://www.iskf.com

Teruyuki Okazaki (岡崎 照幸, June 22, 1931 – April 21, 2020), was a tenth degree black belt in Shotokan Karate, as well as the founder and chief instructor of the International Shotokan Karate Federation (ISKF). Along with Gichin Funakoshi and Masatoshi Nakayama, Okazaki helped found the Japan Karate Association's instructor training program.

== History ==
=== Early years ===
Okazaki was born in Fukuoka Prefecture, Japan. As a young man, he grew up studying judo, kendo, and aikido. In 1948, at the age of sixteen, he entered Takushoku University. It was here that Okazaki began his karate training. Teruyuki Okazaki studied primarily under Gichin Funakoshi, as well as Masatoshi Nakayama. In 1953, Okazaki graduated and was immediately appointed coach of the Takushoku team. Later that year, it was decided that Okazaki would be trained as a "test case" for the still formulating JKA Instructor Trainee Program. In 1955, he was appointed head of the program, which produced some of modern Shotokan's most integral leaders. Takayuki Mikami, Eiji Takaura, and Hirokazu Kanazawa were among the first graduates from this program.

=== Coming to North America ===
As part of an effort by Nakayama to spread the practice of Shotokan karate internationally, Okazaki came to the United States in 1961. Originally planning to stay only six months, he later opened a dojo in Philadelphia, Pennsylvania and settled there permanently. In 1977, Okazaki founded the International Shotokan Karate Federation.

=== ISKF Independence ===
In April 2007 Okazaki proposed, as chief instructor of the ISKF, termination of the ISKF's relationship with the JKA and formed an external independent body. This motion was supported by 25 other countries which continued their relationship with the ISKF and discontinued relations with the JKA.

This decision came following Okazaki's concern that the JKA had not been conducting itself in the manner appropriate to the teachings of Master Gichin Funakoshi.

At the following Canadian National ISKF Championships in Toronto, Canada in October 2007, the ISKF technical committee announced Okazaki's promotion to 10th dan, the highest ranking karate master in the ISKF, and among only a couple of others internationally at the time. Yutaka Yaguchi was also promoted to the rank of 9th dan. After Okazaki's retirement in 2015, Yaguchi served as Chief Instructor of the ISKF, beside Okazaki's nephew Hiroyoshi Okazaki as Chairman. Hiroyoshi Okazaki Shihan is now Chairman and Chief Instructor of the ISKF.

== Professional life ==
Although Okazaki had spent most of his adult life promoting Shotokan throughout North America, he also held a faculty position at Philadelphia's Temple University from 1970 and was an instructor at the University of Pennsylvania, Drexel University, West Chester University, and Thomas Jefferson University.

== Death ==
Okazaki died from complications of COVID-19 on April 21, 2020, during the COVID-19 pandemic in Philadelphia.

== Published works ==
- Teruyuki Okazaki and Milorad V. Stricevic. (April 1984). "The Textbook of Modern Karate", Kodansha Amer Inc. ISBN 0-87011-461-1, ISBN 978-0-87011-461-8
- Teruyuki Okazaki. (2006). "Perfection of Character: Guiding Principles For The Martial Arts & Everyday Life", GMW Publishing, ISBN 0-9785763-2-2, ISBN 978-0-9785763-2-5
