= Taiji Kase =

Japanese karateka

- Born: 9 February 1929; Chiba, Chiba Prefecture, Japan
- Died: 24 November 2004 (aged 75); Paris, France
- Style: Shotokan Karate
- Teachers: Gichin Funakoshi, Gigō Funakoshi, Genshin Hironishi, Tadao Okuyama, Masatoshi Nakayama, Isao Obata
- Rank: 9th dan karate, 2nd dan in judo

Other information
- Spouse: Chieko Kase
- Children: Yumiko Inaba (née Kase), Sachiko Kase
- Notable students: Ilija Jorga, Keinosuke Enoeda, Hiroshi Shirai

Taiji Kase (加瀬 泰治, Kase Taiji; 9 February 1929 – 24 November 2004) was a Japanese master of Shotokan karate who was one of the earliest masters responsible for introducing this martial art into Europe. He taught his style of karate, Shotokan Ryu Kase Ha, in France from the late 1960s to the mid-1980s. In his later years, he travelled across the world teaching karate, but Paris remained his home. Kase held the rank of 9th dan in karate.

== Early life ==
Kase was born on 9 February 1929 in Chiba, Chiba Prefecture, Japan.^{[a]} His father was Nobuaki Kase, who held the rank of 5th dan in judo. He began learning judo before he turned 6 years old, and later in boyhood also studied aikido and kendo.

In 1944, at the age of 15 years, Kase attained the rank of 2nd dan black belt in judo. That same year, he read a book on karate by Gichin Funakoshi, and was inspired to begin studying that art under Funakoshi himself. He also trained under Funakoshi's son, Gigō Funakoshi, before the latter's death in 1945. Genshin Hironishi took on most of the teaching duties from that point. Along with Hironishi, Tadao Okuyama also influenced the young Kase's development in karate. Of his four instructors, Hironishi taught him the longest—six years. Kase had been due to be tested for his 3rd dan in judo, but elected to focus on karate instead.

== Karate career ==
In March 1945, during the closing stages of World War II, Kase enlisted in the Imperial Japanese Navy and joined the Kamikaze corps. The war ended, however, before he was required to give up his life for his country. One of his biographers, Martin Fernandez, wrote: "[Kase] usually says that since he could have died in the war and is alive, he never has a reason to be sad. And this is so, because you can always see him smiling or with a special inner mood" (p. 4). The Shotokan dojo (training hall) had been destroyed by bombing, and he was unable to find another karate dojo, so he returned to training in judo for a while. When the Shotokan students regrouped under Funakoshi, however, he rejoined them.

In 1946, Kase was promoted to 1st dan in Shotokan karate. He began studying economics at Senshu University and, in 1949, became captain of the university's karate team. That same year, he attained the rank of 3rd dan. He graduated from Senshu University in 1951. Kase joined the newly formed Japan Karate Association (JKA) with the aim of becoming a professional karate instructor, and would later become Chief Instructor for the European branch of the JKA. One of his duties in the JKA was to train instructors in kumite (sparring); amongst his students were Keinosuke Enoeda and Hiroshi Shirai as well as Hideo Ochi. Following Funakoshi's death in 1957 and a subsequent division in the JKA, Kase maintained ties with both factions.

In 1964, Kase left Japan to introduce karate overseas. That year, he taught for three months in South Africa, and continued teaching there the next year with Enoeda, Shirai, and Hirokazu Kanazawa. From 1965 to 1966, he taught in the United States of America, West Germany, the Netherlands, and Belgium. In 1967, he taught with Shirai in Italy for several months, and then travelled to France, where he settled in Paris. In 1968, Kase was coach of the French Karate Federation. He went on to teach karate there for almost 20 years in France before deciding to close his dojo in the mid-1980s. Amongst his European students was Steve Cattle, who founded the English Shotokan Academy. He then began travelling around the world to teach karate. Kase was frequently a guest of the former Yugoslav Karate Association, and almost all of the senior Yugoslav karate instructors gained their dan ranks through examinations in which he was involved.

During his time in France, Kase wrote books on his martial art, including 5 Heian: Katas, Karaté, Shotokan (1974), 18 kata supérieurs: Karate-dô Shôtôkan Ryû (1982), and Karaté-dô kata: 5-Heian, 2-Tekki (1983).

== Later life ==
In 1989, Kase and Shirai founded the World Karate-Do Shotokan Academy (WKSA). Kase has called his style of karate "Shotokan Ryu Kase Ha," meaning Shotokan with Kase's personal touch. Although he was travelling around the world promoting his style of karate, Paris remained his home. Kase suffered a heart attack on 31 May 1999, but recovered at the American Hospital of Paris. Following his recovery, he returned to teaching karate.

On 6 November 2004, Kase became critically ill, and was hospitalised. He returned home later on, and appeared to be recovering, but on the morning of 19 November his wife was unable to wake him. Kase had lapsed into unconsciousness, and was brought to hospital, but his condition only deteriorated. Kase died at 5:25 PM on 24 November 2004, leaving behind his wife and two daughters, and his mother (then 101 years old) and two brothers. His funeral was held at the crematorium of Père Lachaise Cemetery, Paris, on 30 November 2004. Kase held the rank of 9th dan at the time of his death.

In June 2005, Kase's widow, Chieko Kase, became honorary President of the Kase Ha Shotokan Ryu Karate-Do Instructors' Academy. One of their daughters, Sachiko, was in attendance at the ceremony.^{[b]}

== See also ==
- List of karateka
- List of Shotokan organizations

== Notes ==
a. Most sources give 9 February as Kase's date of birth, but some sources give 9 January instead.

b. One source lists some of Kase's family: Chieko Kase (wife), Yumiko and Kumihiko Inaba (daughter and son-in-law), Sachiko Kase (daughter), and Yusuke (grandson).
