= Hiroshi Shirai =

Japanese karateka (1937–2024)

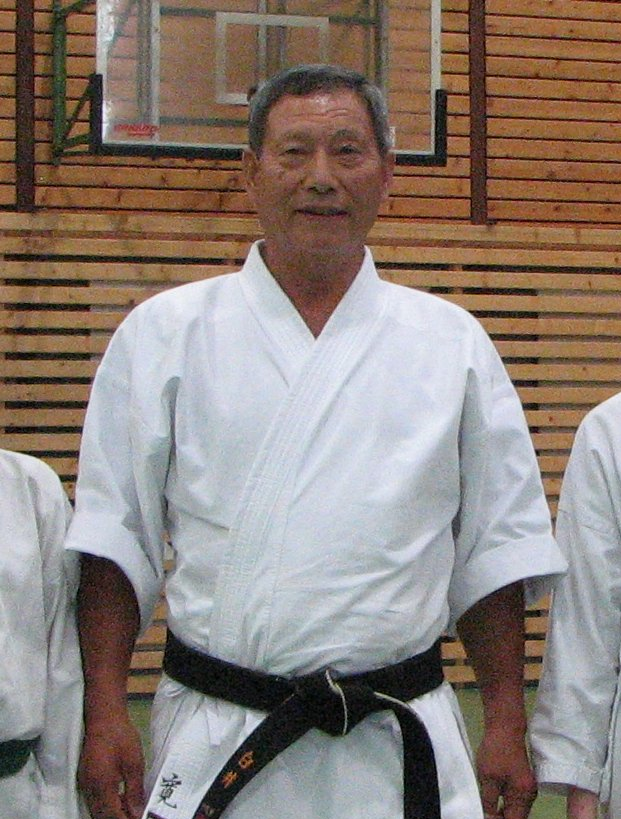
- Shirai in 2009
- Born: 31 July 1937; Nagasaki, Japan
- Died: 9 October 2024 (aged 87); Milan, Italy
- Style: Shotokan Karate
- Teachers: Masatoshi Nakayama, Hidetaka Nishiyama, Taiji Kase, Motokuni Sugiura
- Rank: 10th dan karate (ISKA, ITKF, WKF)

Other information
- Notable students: it:Roberto Fassi, Luigi Zoia, Pino Presti

Hiroshi Shirai (白井 寛, Shirai Hiroshi; 31 July 1937 – 9 October 2024) was a Japanese master of Shotokan karate. He was the founder of the Istituto Shotokan Italia, a subdivision of FIKTA (the Italian Traditional Karate Association) and of the SCI (Shotokan Cultural Institute, formerly WSI - World Shotokan Institute). Shirai held the title of Shihan and was responsible for taking the dan examinations within SCI and, together with Carlo Fugazza, for those within the FIKTA.

== Biography ==
Shirai was born in Nagasaki, Japan on 31 July 1937. He started learning karate in 1956, three years after seeing a promotional video of the Japan Karate Association (JKA) at Komazawa University.

In 1962, he won both the kata and the kumite championships of the JKA, thereby becoming one of those receiving the title 'Grand Champion'.

After a world trip to promote karate together with Taiji Kase, Hirokazu Kanazawa, and Keinosuke Enoeda to Europe, South Africa, and the United States of America, he settled in Milan, Italy in 1965. Under his tutelage the Italian karate flourished and many titles went to his students.

Shirai died home in Milan on 9 October 2024, at the age of 87.

== Goshindo ==
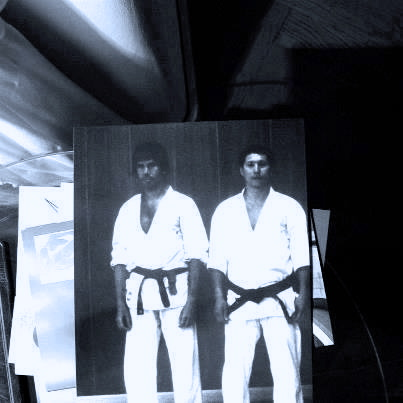
Hiroshi Shirai with Pino Presti, 5th degree black belt, in 1985

Shirai felt that the self-defence (goshindo) aspect of Shotokan karate has been too much in the shadow of kumite and kata. Although he practised karate for self-defence initially, he focussed on kumite for a few years until moving to Europe. He started refocussing on self-defence and its incorporation in the practice of shotokan karate.

During his last years Shirai gave special goshindo oriented stages in Europe, often together with Claudio Ceruti, Massimo Abate, and Angelo Torre.

== Graduation history ==
Shirai received the following dan ranks: 1st - 1957; 2nd - 1959; 3rd - 1961; 4th - unknown year; 5th - 1964; 6th - 1969; 7th - 1974; 8th - 1986, 9th - 1999. He received 10th dan in 2011.

== See also ==
- List of Shotokan organizations
- World Karate Federation
