= Takayuki Mikami =

Japanese karateka

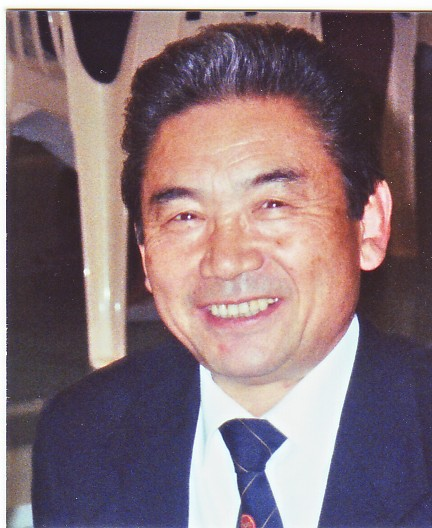
- T. Mikami
- Born: 10 December 1933 (age 92); Niigata Prefecture, Japan
- Style: Shotokan karate
- Teachers: K. Itoe, Masatoshi Nakayama
- Rank: 9th dan karate (JKA)

Other information
- Website: www.lkakarate.com

Takayuki Mikami (三上 孝之, Mikami Takayuki; born 10 December 1933) is a Japanese master of Shotokan karate based in the United States of America. He holds the rank of 9th dan black belt in the art, awarded under the Japan Karate Association. In 1958, Mikami tied for first place in the All Japan Karate Championships. The following year, he became the All Japan champion in kumite (sparring) as well as kata (patterns). In 1961, Mikami won first place in kata again. He was also the first person to graduate from the Japan Karate Association's (JKA) instructor training program instituted by Gichin Funakoshi and Masatoshi Nakayama.

== Early life ==
Mikami was born on December 10, 1933, in Niigata Prefecture, Japan. As a youth, he participated in track and field sports, and was a short-distance runner. Around 1952, Mikami began training in Shotokan karate under instructor K. Itoe. In 1953, he was promoted to the rank of 1st dan. In 1955, he was appointed Team Captain of the Hosei University karate club. He studied literature at the university, but spent most of his time training in karate.

In 1956, Mikami enrolled in the Japan Karate Association's (JKA) newly formed instructor training course under Nakayama. In 1957, Mikami graduated from the course and became a JKA instructor. There were only three students in the group; his classmates were Eiji Takaura and Hirokazu Kanazawa, who also graduated in 1957.

== Japan ==
It was Nakayama's objective to spread the martial art of Shotokan karate around the world, so Mikami began to travel widely, teaching karate. In 1957, the JKA sent him to the Philippines to instruct in Far Eastern University in Manila. After nine months, he returned to Japan to train for and compete in the All Japan Championships.

In 1958, Mikami fought in one of the most celebrated matches in JKA tournament history. Mikami and Kanazawa had been classmates and roommates for most of their karate careers, but had never fought each other in the All Japan Championships before, as Mikami had been teaching in the Philippines. When they faced each other in the final round, very few techniques were thrown, because they knew each other too well. They ended up mostly circling each other, searching for openings, until time was up. It was decided that both instructors were All Japan Kumite Champions for 1958. This was the only time in history that a tie was declared for first place. The following year, Mikami won first in both kata and kumite. In 1961, he became kata champion again.

== United States ==
In 1963, the JKA sent Mikami to the United States. Initially, he taught at a dojo (training hall) in Kansas for 14 months, but then decided to start a new dojo in Louisiana: the Louisiana Karate Association (LKA) in New Orleans. In 1965, Mikami made the LKA the headquarters for the All South Karate Federation, which functioned under the International Shotokan Karate Federation (ISKF), a division of JKA. He has remained there as a teacher and regional director ever since. By 1967, Mikami had reached the rank of 5th dan and his wife was ranked 2nd dan. In 1984, he was promoted to the rank of 8th dan by the JKA.

In 1990, Mikami was named Instructor of the Year in American Karate by Black Belt magazine. In 2005, he was elected President of the Japanese Karate Masters' Association of North America. In 2007, after the ISKF split from JKA, Mikami decided to remain in association with the JKA. That same year, he was appointed to the JKA International Board of Directors. In March 2008, he was named as one of two Senior Technical Advisors to the JKA World Federation Headquarters, Tokyo, by the JKA Board of Directors. Mikami founded the JKA American Federation (JKA/AF) in 2008. Mikami was promoted to 9th dan on September 30, 2011, by JKA headquarters in Tokyo.

== See also ==
- List of Shotokan organizations
