= International Shotokan Karate Federation =

Karate federation

- Abbreviation: ISKF
- Formation: year 1977
- Legal status: Federation
- Official language: English
- Website: iskf.com

The International Shotokan Karate Federation (ISKF) is one of the largest Shotokan karate organizations in North and South America. In 1977, in an effort to spread the study of Shotokan throughout the world, high-ranking members from the Japan Karate Association (JKA) founded the ISKF. In 2007, the ISKF split off from the JKA to become an independent organization. Members of the ISKF follow the teachings of Shotokan's founder, Gichin Funakoshi. Though the ISKF is based mainly in the United States, affiliated dojos can be found in over forty countries worldwide. Hiroyoshi Okazaki is the chairman and chief instructor of the ISKF.

== Regional directors ==
| Instructor | Rank | Region | Regional headquarters' official site |
|---|---|---|---|
| Teruyuki Okazaki | 10th dan | East Coast Region | ISKF Headquarters |
| Hiroyoshi Okazaki | 9th dan | Chairman and Chief Instructor | ISKF Headquarters |
| Yutaka Yaguchi | 9th dan | Mountain States Region | ISKF Mountain States |
| James Field | 8th dan | Southwest Region | ISKF Santa Monica |
| Kristina Haight | 7th dan | Northwest Region | Western Washington Shotokan Karate Club |
| Susan Jones | 6th dan | Alaska Region | Alaska Shotokan Karate |
| Greer Golden/Martin Vaughan | 6th/7th dan | Mid-America Region | ISKF Mid-America |
| Lee Doohen | 7th dan | North Central Region | ISKF North Central |
| Chuck Coburn | 7th dan | Western Region | ISKF Western |
| Kim Koo | 5th dan | South Atlantic Region | ISKF South Atlantic |
| Leon Sill | 8th dan | Southern Region | ISKF Southern |

== Testing ==
For all Kyū (colored belt) tests, the candidate must demonstrate the mandated kata for their rank, karate basics, and sparring. Testing of a karateka is typically allowed every three months until 1st kyu is obtained. The minimum waiting period between 1st kyu and 1st dan is typically one year.

For dan (black belt) examinations, the candidate must travel to the regional headquarters or attend clinics given by certified examiners (such as national competitions). The candidate must demonstrate two katas, one of his or her choice and one chosen by the chief examiner. The candidate is also tested on free sparring, which is non-point (i.e. it does not stop when someone makes contact). Older candidates may also demonstrate self-defense techniques, in which they must defend themselves from a series of attacks from an instructor. Board-breaking is not generally tested, as it falls outside the purview of traditional karate.

== Master camp ==
The ISKF runs an annual training retreat in Green Lane, Pennsylvania, which draws karate practitioners from all over the world. Guest instructors from outside of the ISKF are often invited to teach classes. Mandatory classes are held twice per day, optional training once per day, and a special instructor training class once per day. Dan (black belt) exams, examiner certification, and judge certification are also offered. The retreat generally concludes with a goodwill tournament.

Other camps are held outside the United States.

== Collegiate karate ==
The ISKF is affiliated at both the National level with the National Collegiate Karate Association (NCKA) and at the regional Level with the East Coast Collegiate Karate Union (ECCKU). Hiroyoshi Okazaki is the chairman and chief instructor; Dr. JD Swanson is the director of both the NCKA and ECCKU. Dr. Swanson runs two ISKF Collegiate Clubs at Brown University and Salve Regina University and is author of the popular book "Karate Science: Dynamic Movement published by YMAA. Jason Haase is the ECCKU coordinator. The ECCKU has 15 member-colleges, but any karateka in college may compete in tournaments. The biggest collegiate event to date was held at Lycoming College in 2018, had over 80 participants and multiple instructors (including Sensei Hoffman, Vance, Haase, Swanson, Taka-Hashi & Bliss).

== Split with JKA ==
In June 2007, the ISKF ended its affiliation with the JKA due to a conflict over new rules that were declared at the 2007 JKA board of directors meeting.

On April 2, 2007, three of the founding members of the ISKF (Takashina, Koyama, and Takayuki Mikami) decided to remain with the JKA, forming JKA/WF Americas and the JKA American Federation (JKA/AF). However, a majority of the practitioners within the ISKF decided to remain with that organization rather than JKA, including Teruyuki Okazaki, one of the founders.

Mikami and Takashina have made individual statements about their decision to remain in the JKA.

The ISKF made a formal statement regarding the break.

== 2011 Political Split ==
In 2011 the International Shotokan Karate Federation (ISKF) suffered a split when Frank Woon-A-Tai left the ISKF to form the International Karate Daigaku (IKD). During the split approximately half of the Canadian membership from the ISKF left to help form the IKD including all of the membership from Ontario, Prince Edward Island, Newfoundland, more than half of the membership from Quebec, Saskatchewan and Manitoba. Other countries soon followed suit including Guyana, Frank Woon-A-Tai's home country.
