= Noctography =

Noctography may refer to:

- Means of writing using tactile, rather than visual, feedback:
  - Noctograph, using a stylus and a guide for maintaining straight line of characters
  - Nyctography, with pattern of square holes, each used as a guide for encoding one letter via dots at the square's vertices and lines along its edges
- Noctography (photographic technique)
