= Isaac Stearns Jr. =

American sergeant during the American Revolutionary War

Isaac Stearns Jr. (June 13, 1750 – April 29, 1807), of Billerica, Massachusetts, was a sergeant in the American Revolutionary Army. On April 19, 1775, he was among the minutemen who rallied at the first alarm at the onset of the Battles of Lexington and Concord. He was also a member of a group of forty men, led by Ethan Allen, that captured Fort Ticonderoga. Stearns contributed £10 to a fund established to hire men to serve in the Revolutionary Army.

Stearns was a soldier in the Siege of Boston for eight months and participated in the Battle of Bunker Hill, where he stood alongside Colonel William Prescott and advised him as to when the British were near enough to fire upon, stating: "there, that will do." On December 18, 1777, Stearns married Mary Crosby. The couple relocated to Ashburnham the following year. Stearns died on April 29, 1807.

== Bibliography ==
- Daughters of the American Revolution (1901). Lineage Book - National Society of the Daughters of the American Revolution. Vol. 13. Daughters of the American Revolution.
- Drake, Samuel Adams (1880). Samuel Adams Drake (ed.). History of Middlesex County, Massachusetts: Containing Carefully Prepared Histories of Every City and Town in the County. Vol. 2. Estes and Lauriat.
- Van Wagenen, Avis Stearns (1901). Genealogy and Memoirs of Isaac Stearns and His Descendants. Syracuse, New York: Courier Printing.
