= Square script =

Square script may refer to any of several scripts with blocky letters used to write various languages:

== Arabic ==
- Square Kufic

== Aramaic ==
- Aramaic square script, a form of Imperial Aramaic that emerged as a writing system for the Aramaic language in the 5th century BC

== Hebrew ==
- Ktav Ashuri, "Assyrian script" or "Jewish square script", identical to Aramaic square script but adopted by Jews to write Biblical Hebrew
- the modern Hebrew alphabet (as opposed to the old Paleo-Hebrew and the later Samaritan script)

== Latin characters ==
- square hand, a variant of nyctography that doesn't require the reader to know a cipher; sometimes used by DeafBlind people to communicate with sighted people

== Mongolian ==
- 'Phags-pa script
- Zanabazar square script
