= Ángel Calderón de la Barca y Belgrano =

Spanish nobleman and politician

Ángel Calderón de la Barca y Belgrano (2 October 1790 in Buenos Aires, Viceroyalty of the Río de la Plata – 1861) in Spain was a Spanish nobleman and diplomat who served Spain at diplomatic posts in the United States and Mexico and as Minister of State for Foreign Affairs from 1853 and 1854. He was a correspondent of William H. Prescott, the eminent American historian. His second wife was Fanny Calderón de la Barca, the author of Life in Mexico, an account of the two years the couple lived in Mexico.

== Career ==
In 1843, Calderón de la Barca was elected an Associate Fellow of the American Academy of Arts and Sciences. From 1844 to 1853, he served as Envoy Extraordinary and Minister Plenipotentiary to the United States in Washington, D.C. under Prime Ministers Ramon Maria Narvaez and American presidents John Tyler, James K. Polk, Zachary Taylor, and Millard Fillmore. Between 1853 and 1854, Calderón de la Barca served as Minister of State under Prime Minister Luis José Sartorius, during the reign of Queen Isabella II.

Orestes Brownson recounted the following:

"Senor Calderon de la Barca, the Spanish minister for several years to our government at Washington, told me in April, 1852, that when he was first sent by his government to ours at Washington, in 1822, he was charmed with every thing he saw or heard. 'The government struck me,' he said, 'as strictly honest, and your statesmen as remarkable for their public spirit, integrity, and incorruptibility. I was subsequently sent to Mexico; and when, recalled from that mission, I was offered my choice between Rome and Washington, such was my high opinion of the American republic, and the honesty and integrity of its government, that I chose Washington in preference to Rome, though the latter was more generally coveted. I have been here now for several years a close observer, and I have seen every thing change under my eyes. All my admiration for the republic and for republican government has vanished. I cannot conceive a government more corrupt than this government of yours. I see men come here worth only their salary as members of Congress, and in two or four years return home worth from a hundred thousand to two hundred thousand dollars.' — This was said in 1852, when corruption was very little in comparison with what it has become."

== Personal life ==
Calderón de la Barca was married first to Isabel Ana de Vera y Sotosánchez and later to Frances Erskine Inglis, who was granted the Marquisate of Calderón de la Barca in 1877. She wrote Life in Mexico, a successful book concerning their residence from 1839 to 1842 in Mexico when her husband was stationed there as an envoy.

== In popular culture ==
In Steven Spielberg's Amistad, Calderón de la Barca is played by Tomas Milian.

Political offices
Preceded by Luis López de la Torre Ayllón	Minister of State; 21 June 1853 – 17 July 1854	Succeeded by Luis Mayans
