= Ralph Wedgwood (inventor) =

English inventor

- Born: 1766; Burslem, Staffordshire
- Died: 1837 (aged 70–71)
- Occupation: inventor
- Spouses: Mary Yeomans; Sarah Taylor; Mary Anne Copeland

Ralph Wedgwood (1766–1837) was an English inventor and member of the Wedgwood family of potters. His most notable invention was the earliest form of carbon paper, a method of creating duplicate paper documents, which he called "stylographic writer" or Noctograph. He obtained a patent for the invention in 1806.

Wedgwood was born in Burslem, Staffordshire. He was the eldest son of the potter Thomas Wedgwood (1734–1788) and his wife Elizabeth Taylor. He married three times and was widowed twice. His first marriage was to Mary Yeomans in 1790, and they had two children, Mary and Ralph, but he was widowed in 1795. He remarried Sarah Taylor; they had a son Samuel (1800–1863), but she, too, died in 1807. In 1808, he married for a third time, to Mary Anne Copeland, and they had three children: Trianne, Maria and William. His third wife survived him and died in 1867.

Ralph was the cousin of Josiah Wedgwood. Funding for Ralph's inventions were provided by Josiah's eldest son, Josiah Wedgwood II.
