= William Prescott Jr. =

American politician

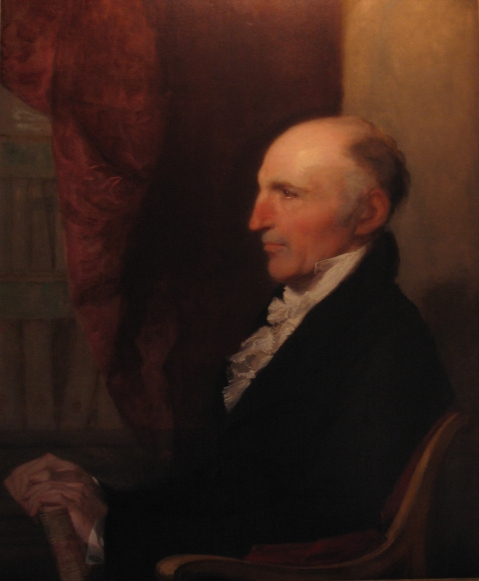
- portrait by Gilbert Stuart
- Born: 19 October 1762; Pepperell
- Died: 8 December 1844 (aged 82); Boston
- Alma mater: Harvard University
- Occupation: Politician
- Children: William H. Prescott, Catherine Elizabeth Prescott Dexter
- Parent(s): William Prescott; Abigail Prescott

William Prescott Jr. (October 19, 1762 in Pepperell, Massachusetts – December 8, 1844 in Boston, Massachusetts) was a lawyer, banker, and politician best known for representing Massachusetts at the 1814–15 Hartford Convention.

== Biography ==
Prescott was the only child of American Revolution leader Colonel William Prescott, who served at Bunker Hill in 1775. William Prescott Jr., graduated from Harvard in 1783, and then taught at Brooklyn, Connecticut, and later at Beverly, Massachusetts. He passed the bar exam in 1787 after studying law in Beverly with Nathan Dane.

Prescott founded a law practice in Beverly. In 1789, he moved his practice to Salem, Massachusetts, where he became a well-known attorney. He represented Salem for several years in the Massachusetts Legislature. He was elected a state senator by the Federal party for Essex County, first in 1806, and again in 1813. He twice declined a seat on the bench of the Supreme Court of Massachusetts. In 1808 he moved to Boston, and was for several years a member of the Governor's Council.

Prescott was elected as a representative to the 1814 secessionist Hartford Convention. In 1815, he was elected a Fellow of the American Academy of Arts and Sciences. In 1818, Prescott purchased 50 shares of the Suffolk Bank, a clearinghouse bank on State Street in Boston. He married Catherine Greene Hickling, a daughter of Thomas Hickling, for many years United States consul at the Azores. Their son William H. Prescott became a well-known historian.
