= Noctograph =

A noctograph is a writing instrument composed of a piece of paper whose underside is treated with printer's ink carbon paper and a metal board with clips to hold the paper in place and guidelines to make for straight writing in the dark. The user writes with a metal stylus, and thus does not have to ink a pen or worry about knocking an inkstand over.

The original purpose was to allow the blind or partially sighted to write with more ease than with a traditional pen, although it has also been used by the fully sighted to write in the dark. It was originally patented by Ralph Wedgwood in 1806.

== Notable users ==
- William H. Prescott The noctograph that Prescott used to write his many historical volumes is on display at the William Hickling Prescott House (house museum) at 55 Beacon Street, Boston, Massachusetts.
- James Holman

== See also ==
- Nyctograph—a card template of square holes invented by Lewis Carroll in 1891 to write in the dark.
