= Frances Erskine Inglis =

- Born: 23 December 1804; Edinburgh
- Died: 6 February 1882 (aged 77); Madrid
- Other names: Marquesa de Calderón de la Barca, Fanny Calderón de la Barca
- Occupation: Author
- Known for: Life in Mexico

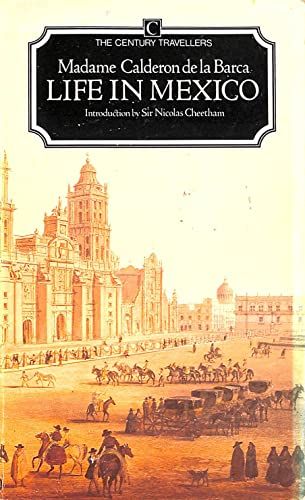

Frances "Fanny" Erskine Inglis, later the Marquesa of Calderón de la Barca and best known as Fanny Calderón de la Barca, (Edinburgh, Scotland, 1804 – Madrid, Spain, 1882), was a 19th-century travel writer best known for her 1843 memoir, Life in Mexico, which is regarded by historians as one of the most influential Latin American travel narratives of the 19th century.

The Inglis family immigrated to the United States in 1835. Fanny married a Spanish diplomat, Ángel Calderón de la Barca y Belgrano, in 1838. In 1839 she accompanied him on his posting to Mexico. In 1843, the couple returned to the U.S. and Calderón de la Barca published Life in Mexico. In 1852, the couple moved to Madrid, Spain where Ángel had been appointed as a Minister of State by the royal government of Spain. In 1856, Fanny Calderón de la Barca's book The Attaché in Madrid, was published in the United States. The book never achieved the popularity of Life in Mexico.

After her husband died in 1861, Calderón de la Barca served as the governess of Infanta Isabel, the daughter of Isabella II of Spain. In 1877, she was awarded the title, Marquesa de Calderón de la Barca. She died in Madrid on 6 February 1882 at the age of 77.

== Early life ==
Inglis was born on 23 December 1804 in Edinburgh, Scotland, the fifth of ten children of her Scottish parents, members of the Scottish gentry. Her father, William Inglis (pronounced Ingalls), was a landowner and a distinguished lawyer who was a member of the Writer to the Signet, a branch of the legal profession, and grandson of David Erskine, 9th Earl of Buchan, and Colonel James Gardiner a British Army Officer slain near his home Bankton House during the Battle of Prestonpans. Her mother, Jane Stein, came from the wealthy Stein family, known as owners of a prominent distillery, and given credit for inventing industrialized distilling. Jane's sister, Anne Stein, married Sir Alexander Duff, and was the mother of James Duff, 5th Earl Fife, father of the 1st Duke of Fife. Inglis was well-educated and as a young woman traveled to Italy.

In the 1820s William Inglis' financial situation deteriorated and in 1828, all his property was sequestered by his creditors. The family moved to France and settled near Le Havre. Inglis died on 28 June 1830.

His widow, Jane, three daughters, including Fanny, and several grandchildren moved to Boston, Massachusetts in autumn 1831. The family established a school there which was popular with the upper classes. In 1833, however, a pamphlet, allegedly written by Fanny and a male admirer, created a scandal by its caricatures of prominent citizens of the city. In 1835 or thereabouts, with the school declining in favor, the family relocated to New Brighton, Staten Island, New York and established another school. Staten Island was a popular summer destination for people escaping the heat of the cities and there Inglis met Spanish diplomat Ángel Calderón de la Barca y Belgrano, fifteen years older than her. The couple married on 24 September 1838. The new Madame Calderón de la Barca gave her age as 28 although she was 33.

In the United States, Inglis was acquainted with many of the literary figures of the day. She met her future husband in 1836 through the mutual acquaintance of historian, William Hickling Prescott, who befriended Ángel due to his interest in obtaining archival materials from Spain. While still single, Inglis wrote two novels: Gertrude--A Tale of the 16th Century (1830) and The Affianced One (1832). The second novel was about Italy and praised for its knowledge of the subject. Both books, however, were criticized for their "gratuitous amplifications."

== Mexico ==
In 1839, Ángel was appointed by the Queen Isabella II to be the first Spanish Minister (Ambassador) to Mexico, which had gained its independence from Spain in 1821. The Calderón de la Barca's departed New York by ship for Mexico on 27 October 1839 and arrived, after a long and trying passage, in Veracruz on 26 December. The couple resided in Mexico City until February 1842 when they returned to the United States.

Mexico at the time was in economic and political chaos, still recovering from its long war of independence, a Spanish invasion in 1829, and the "Pastry War" against France in 1838. As the wife of the Spanish Minister, Madam Calderón de la Barca traveled extensively throughout the country and met its politicians and prominent citizens. She would become the best-known, and possibly the first, foreign woman to write about Mexico in the 19th century. The Calderón de la Barca's returned to the U.S. in 1842.

== The United States ==
While Fanny was living in Mexico, her family became embroiled in another scandal. Her widowed brother-in-law ran away with a 15-year-old girl who was a student at the Inglis school on Staten Island and the heiress to a large fortune. (The wayward couple apparently had a happy marriage.) In the aftermath of the scandal the family moved again to Boston and opened another school. In Boston, Fanny wrote her book Life in Mexico, During a Residence Of Two Years In That Country. She traveled with her husband in 1842–1843 to Scotland and Spain. In 1843, Ángel was appointed Minister of Spain to the U.S. and the couple resided in Washington, D.C. until 1852.

=== Life in Mexico ===
Life in Mexico was published in 1842 and 1843 in Boston and London. Her friend, the historian William H. Prescott, contributed an introduction. The book is a travel narrative which contains 54 letters Fanny Calderón de la Barca wrote during her two years in Mexico. It describes the politics, people, and landscape of Mexico through the eyes of a Spanish diplomat's wife, thus providing a unique lens into the culture. Although her opinions about Mexican culture were perceptive, they were often biased, typical of an upper-class European of her day.

Reviews of Life in Mexico in the English--speaking world were mostly favorable. In Mexico, the Mexican government newspaper began publishing the book in serial form, but ceased publication after a few issues because of criticism. One critic characterized the book as "unjust, passionate, virulent diatribes" by Calderón de la Barca despite the "hospitality" she and her husband received in Mexico. Life in Mexico was not translated in full into Spanish until 1920.

Prescott's Conquest of Mexico was published in the same year as Life in Mexico. The two books became significant to the United States' war effort during the Mexican–American War of 1846-48. The United States government consulted with Calderón de la Barca and Prescott to gain intelligence which assisted in the United States' invasion of Mexico. Much of the information that modern historians have about everyday Mexican life in this period comes from Calderón de la Barca's book.

=== Conversion to Catholicism ===
Calderón de la Barca was born into a family which belonged to the Church of Scotland. Initially hostile to the Catholicism she encountered in Mexico, she joined the Catholic church on 27 May 1847 in the Holy Trinity Church in Georgetown (now part of Washington, D.C.).

Her enthusiasm for her new religion is reflected in her translation into English of the History of the Life and Institutes of Ignatius Loyola which was published in 1855.

== Spain ==
The Calderón de la Barca's departed the U.S. for Spain on 13 August 1853 and arrived on 17 September. Ángel was appointed Minister of State for Foreign Affairs, but Spain was in political chaos. The government of which he was a part fell on 17 July 1854. To avoid arrest, the Calderóns fled Spain for Paris and lived nearby for two years. Returning to Spain, Ángel became a Senator in the Spanish parliament, the Cortes. He died in 1861. Calderón de la Barca entered a convent briefly after her husband's death, but was asked by Queen Isabella II to serve as the governess of her nine-year-old daughter, Infanta Isabel. She moved into the royal palace and served as governess until Infanta Isabel married in 1868. Calderón de la Barca made a visit to the United States after the wedding, thereby missing the outbreak of another revolution which deposed Isabella II. The royal family fled to France. Calderón de la Barca rejoined them by January 1870 and accompanied the royal family on their travels around Europe. In February 1875, the Infanta Isabel was able to return to Spain and Calderón de la Barca also returned, becoming her Lady-in-waiting and again residing in the royal palace. In 1877, Calderón de la Barca was given the title of Marquesa de Calderón de la Barca.

Calderón de la Barca was still in apparent good health until 1882 when she caught a cold at an elegant dinner party and died on 6 February.

=== The Attaché in Madrid ===
Published in New York in 1856 under the male pseudonym of a young German diplomat, Calderón de la Barca's The Attaché in Madrid is, by far, her lesser known travel account. Although it was used as part of Spanish history, it has become more or less forgotten. This is partially due to its publication under a male name, which would have diminished the uniqueness of the female perspective present in Life in Mexico, since many male-authored travel accounts from writers such as Washington Irving had already been written on 19th-century Spain. Because her husband was now a diplomat in Spain, She could not speak openly about Spanish life and had to be careful to conceal her identity.

Much like in Life in Mexico, Calderón de la Barca describes the "charitable institutions" formerly of interest to her under the guise of the curiosity of her male persona's mother. She uses "his" family members’ interests as justifications for descriptions that might not have otherwise been significant to a male travel writer. But simultaneously, she also utilizes this male identity to speak on topics inaccessible to females of her class, such as the San Isidro Festival, the Burial of the Sardine and bullfights. In addition, by offering the "German" outsider's perspective, she frees her narrative from the typical mid-19th-century United States discourse on Spanish decadence, instead showing her German Catholic narrator's admiration of Spain.

Although Calderón de la Barca she uses "anonymity" and "maleness" to justify her point of view, Calderón de la Barca actually reconstructs the concept by offering multiple perspectives contrary to the primary theme of "domination" in male travel writing. For instance, as if in response to claims in male narratives about the infidelity of Spanish women, she defends their honor. In effect, his "masculine voice" is only one amongst others, male and female, Spanish and foreigner, providing a balanced view that distinguishes her from authentic male travel writers.

Despite being poorly received in comparison to Life in Mexico, The Attaché in Madrid did experience a brief resurgence in 1898, after Calderón de la Barca's death, having been circulated from the United States to Havana, Cuba, and discovered by a Spanish artillery captain, Cristobal de Reyna. He considered it a "valuable historical document" and published it under the name, "Don Ramiro", fully accepting its maleness and unaware of its true authorship.
