= Daniel Lyman =

American judge

30th Chief Justice of the Rhode Island Supreme Court
- In office 1812–1816
- Preceded by: Peleg Arnold
- Succeeded by: James Burrill Jr.

Personal details
- Born: 1756 Durham, Connecticut
- Died: 1830 (aged 73–74)
- Spouse: Mary Wanton
- Education: Yale College
- Occupation: Surveyor, lawyer, military officer, chief justice

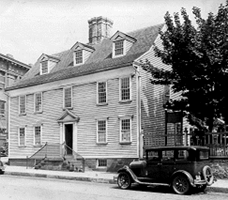
Wanton-Lyman-Hazard House in Newport in 1920s

Daniel Lyman (1756–1830) was a New England soldier, chief justice of the Rhode Island Supreme Court and member of the secessionist Hartford Convention.

Lyman was born in Durham, Connecticut, to Thomas Lyman. While attending Yale College, Lyman was commissioned as a captain in the Continental Army, serving in the battles of Ticonderoga, Crown Point, and St. Johns. After his graduation in 1776, he was commissioned as a major, served at the battle of White Plains, and from 1778 until the close of the war was an aide to General William Heath. He married Mary "Polly" Wanton in 1782 in Newport, Rhode Island, and they had 13 children. Lyman served as a member of the Hartford Convention in 1814-15 He later acted as surveyor for the port of Newport. He also practiced law, and served as the chief justice of the Rhode Island Supreme Court from 1812 to 1816. He retired north of Providence in 1808, and became a partner in the Lyman Cotton Manufacturing Company. He was also an original member of the Society of the Cincinnati. Lyman was elected a member of the American Antiquarian Society in 1815.

Lyman's daughter Harriet Hazard and his son-in-law Benjamin Hazard inherited Lyman's home, the Wanton-Lyman-Hazard House, now a museum in Newport.

== Bibliography ==
- Bibliographic Cyclopedia of Rhode Island (1881), p. 208.
- National Cyclopedia of American Biography, volume X, p. 119.
- Coleman, Lyman. Genealogy of the Lyman Family in Great Britain and North America (Albany, N.Y.: J, Munsell, 1872), p. 207.
