= Hartford Convention =

1814–1815 political meeting in Hartford, Connecticut

The Secret Journal of the Hartford Convention, published 1823.

The Hartford Convention was a series of meetings from December 15, 1814, to January 5, 1815, in Hartford, Connecticut, United States, where New England leaders of the Federalist Party met to discuss their grievances and concerns about the ongoing War of 1812 and the political problems arising from the federal government's increasing power.

This convention discussed removing the Three-fifths Compromise and requiring a two-thirds majority in Congress for the admission of new states, declarations of war, and creating laws restricting trade. The Federalists also discussed their grievances with the Louisiana Purchase and the Embargo of 1807. However, weeks after the convention's end, news of Major General Andrew Jackson's overwhelming victory in New Orleans swept over the Northeast. This led to an increased sense of nationalism, and many thought the Federalists were traitors. As a result, this discredited and disgraced the Federalists, resulting in their elimination as a major national political force.

The convention was controversial at the time, and many historians consider it a contributing factor to the downfall of the Federalist Party. There are many reasons for this, not least of which was the suggestion that the states of New England, the Federalists' main base, secede from the union of the United States and create a new country.

== Background ==
=== American relations with Great Britain ===
Under the administrations of George Washington and John Adams, vigorous trade with France was maintained while both administrations engaged in an undeclared war with France. With the resumption of the Napoleonic Wars at the same time that Thomas Jefferson assumed office, relations with both France and Great Britain deteriorated. Jefferson's goal was an expansion of free trade through Great Britain's lifting of trade restrictions placed against the United States. However, to pressure Britain into compliance, he adopted anti-foreign trade policies such as the Embargo Act of 1807 and the Non-Intercourse Act of 1809. These policies were very unpopular among Northeastern merchants and shippers. Jefferson's successor, President James Madison, and what was now called the Democratic-Republican Party, continued his policies.

The opposing Federalist Party regained strength, especially in New England and New York; it collaborated with Lieutenant Governor DeWitt Clinton of New York City and supported him for president in 1812.

=== Opposition to the War of 1812 ===
When Madison was re-elected in 1812, the discontent in New England intensified. In late 1813, Madison signed a more restrictive embargo act than any of those approved by Jefferson, this time prohibiting all trade between American ports (the coastal trade) and fishing outside harbors. By the summer of 1814, the war had turned against the Americans. After ending their war with Napoleonic France, Great Britain was able to marshal more resources to North America and had effectively blockaded the entire eastern coastline. Territory in the Maine district of Massachusetts was occupied in July, the White House and Capitol were burned in August, and by September, the British were advancing further in Maine and the Lake Champlain area of New York. A naval assault on Boston was expected in the near future. Free trade with the rest of the world had virtually ceased, thousands were thrown out of work, and by August, banks were suspending specie payment. The federal government was approaching bankruptcy.

New England governors followed a policy of giving minimal support to the Federal government in waging the war. With the exception of Governor John Taylor Gilman of New Hampshire, most requisitions for state militia were denied. New Englanders were reluctant to have their militia, needed to defend their coasts from British attacks, assigned elsewhere or placed under the command of the regular army. General Winfield Scott, after the war, blamed Madison's policy of ignoring Federalists, who in New England constituted the best-educated class, when granting regular army commissions in New England.

The anti-war sentiment in Massachusetts was so strong that even Samuel Dexter, the Democratic-Republican candidate for governor, opposed the national party's commerce policies. Federalists still dominated the 1814 elections, returning Caleb Strong as governor and electing 360 Federalists against only 156 Democratic-Republicans to the lower house of the Massachusetts Legislature. In September, Governor Strong refused a request to provide and support 5,000 troops to retake territory in Maine.

Because Massachusetts and Connecticut had refused to subject their militia to the orders of the War Department, Madison declined to pay their expenses. Consequently, critics said that Madison had abandoned New England to the common enemy. The Massachusetts Legislature appropriated $1 million to support a state army of 10,000 men. Harrison Gray Otis, who inspired these measures, suggested that the eastern states meet at a convention in Hartford, Connecticut. As early as 1804, Timothy Pickering and other Federalists discussed secession from the Union if the national government became too oppressive.

In September 1814, Madison asked Congress for a conscription bill. Even though this had not been one of the original grievances that led to the call for the convention, Federalists presented this as further proof that the Democratic-Republicans intended to bring military despotism into the nation. Thomas Grosvenor of New York saw this as the result of the administration leading the country "defenseless and naked, into that lake of blood she is yet swimming."

=== Secession ===
Secession was again mentioned in 1814–1815; all but one leading Federalist newspaper in New England supported a plan to expel the western states from the Union. Otis, the key leader of the Convention, blocked radical proposals such as a seizure of the Federal customs house, impounding federal funds, or declaring neutrality. Otis thought the Madison administration was near collapse and that unless conservatives like himself and the other delegates took charge, the radical secessionists might take power. Indeed, Otis was unaware that Massachusetts Governor Strong had already sent a secret mission to discuss terms with the British for a separate peace.

There are several reasons why historians doubt that the New England Federalists were seriously considering secession. All the states, especially Connecticut with its claims to western lands, stood to lose more than they would gain. Efforts were made in the delegation selection process to exclude firebrands like John Lowell, Jr., Timothy Pickering, and Josiah Quincy who might have pushed for secession, and the final report of the convention did not propose secession. Nevertheless, Southern secessionists cited the convention as precedent in the crisis that preceded the American Civil War, which then became a standard part of the Lost Cause of the Confederacy after the war.

Despite this, the Madison administration had reasons to be concerned about the consequences of the Hartford Convention. Federalists were already blocking administration efforts to finance the war and bring it to a successful conclusion with an invasion of Canada. There were fears that New England would negotiate a separate peace with Great Britain, an action in many ways just as harmful to the nation as actual secession. In preparing for a worst-case scenario, Madison moved troops from the New York–Canada border to Albany where they could quickly be sent to Massachusetts or Connecticut to preserve federal authority. Several New England regiments that had participated in the Niagara campaign were returned home where it was hoped that they could serve as a focal point for New Englanders opposed to disunion.

== Call for a convention ==
In response to the war crisis, Massachusetts Governor Strong called the newly elected General Court to a special session on October 5, 1814. Strong's message to the legislature was referred to a joint committee headed by Harrison Gray Otis. Otis was considered a moderate. His report delivered three days later called for resistance of any British invasion, criticized the leadership that had brought the nation close to disaster, and called for a convention of New England states to deal with both their common grievances and common defense. Otis' report was passed by the state senate on October 12 by a 22 to 12 vote and the house on October 16 by 260 to 20.

A letter was sent to the other New England governors, inviting them to send delegates to a convention in Hartford, Connecticut. The stated purpose of the convention was to propose constitutional amendments to protect their section's interests and to make arrangements with the Federal government for their own military defense.

Twelve delegates were appointed by the Massachusetts legislature, of which George Cabot and Harrison G. Otis were chief (see list below). In Connecticut, the legislature denounced Madison's "odious and disastrous war", voiced concern about plans to implement a national draft, and selected seven delegates led by Chauncey Goodrich and James Hillhouse. Rhode Island's legislature selected four delegates to discuss "the best means of cooperating for our mutual defense against the common enemy, and upon the measures which it may be in the power of said states, consistently with their obligations to adopt, to restore and secure to the people thereof, their rights and privileges under the Constitution of the United States". New Hampshire's legislature was not in session and its Federalist governor, John Gilman, refused to call it back into session. Vermont's legislature voted unanimously not to send delegates. Two New Hampshire counties and one Vermont county each sent a delegate, bringing the total to 26. On December 15, 1814 the delegates met in the Connecticut Senate's chamber at the Old State House in Hartford.

The following lists the states that attended and the names of the twenty-six attendees.

- Massachusetts
  - George Cabot
  - Harrison Gray Otis
  - Nathan Dane
  - William Prescott, Jr.
  - Timothy Bigelow
  - Joshua Thomas
  - Samuel Sumner Wilde
  - Joseph S. Lyman
  - Stephen Longfellow, Jr.
  - Daniel Waldo
  - Hodijah Baylies
  - George Bliss
- New Hampshire
  - Benjamin West
  - Mills Olcott

- Connecticut
  - Chauncey Goodrich
  - John Treadwell
  - James Hillhouse
  - Zephaniah Swift
  - Nathaniel Smith
  - Calvin Goddard
  - Roger Minott Sherman
- Rhode Island
  - Daniel Lyman
  - Samuel Ward, Jr.
  - Edward Manton
  - Benjamin Hazard
- Vermont
  - William Hall, Jr.

== Secret meetings ==
In all, twenty-six delegates attended the secret meetings. No records of the proceedings were kept, and meetings continued through January 5, 1815. After choosing George Cabot as president and Theodore Dwight as secretary, the convention remained in closed session for three weeks. Cabot's journal of its proceedings, opened in 1818, was a meager sketch of formal proceedings; he made no record of yeas and nays, stated none of the amendments offered to the various reports, and neglected to attach the names of authors to proposals. It is impossible to ascertain the speeches or votes of individual delegates.

== Convention report ==
The convention ended with a report and resolutions, signed by the delegates present, and adopted on the day before final adjournment. The report said that New England had a "duty" to assert its authority over unconstitutional infringements on its sovereignty—a doctrine that echoed the policy of Jefferson and Madison in 1798 (in the Kentucky and Virginia Resolutions), and which would later reappear in a different context as "nullification".

The Hartford Convention's final report proposed several amendments to the U.S. Constitution. These attempted to combat the policies of the ruling Democratic-Republicans by:

1. Prohibiting any trade embargo lasting over 60 days;
2. Requiring a two-thirds Congressional majority for declaration of offensive war, admission of a new state, or interdiction of foreign commerce;
3. Removing the three-fifths representation advantage of the South;
4. Limiting future presidents to one term;
5. Requiring each president to be from a different state than his predecessor. (This provision was aimed directly at the dominance of Virginia in the presidency since 1800).

== Negative reception and legacy ==
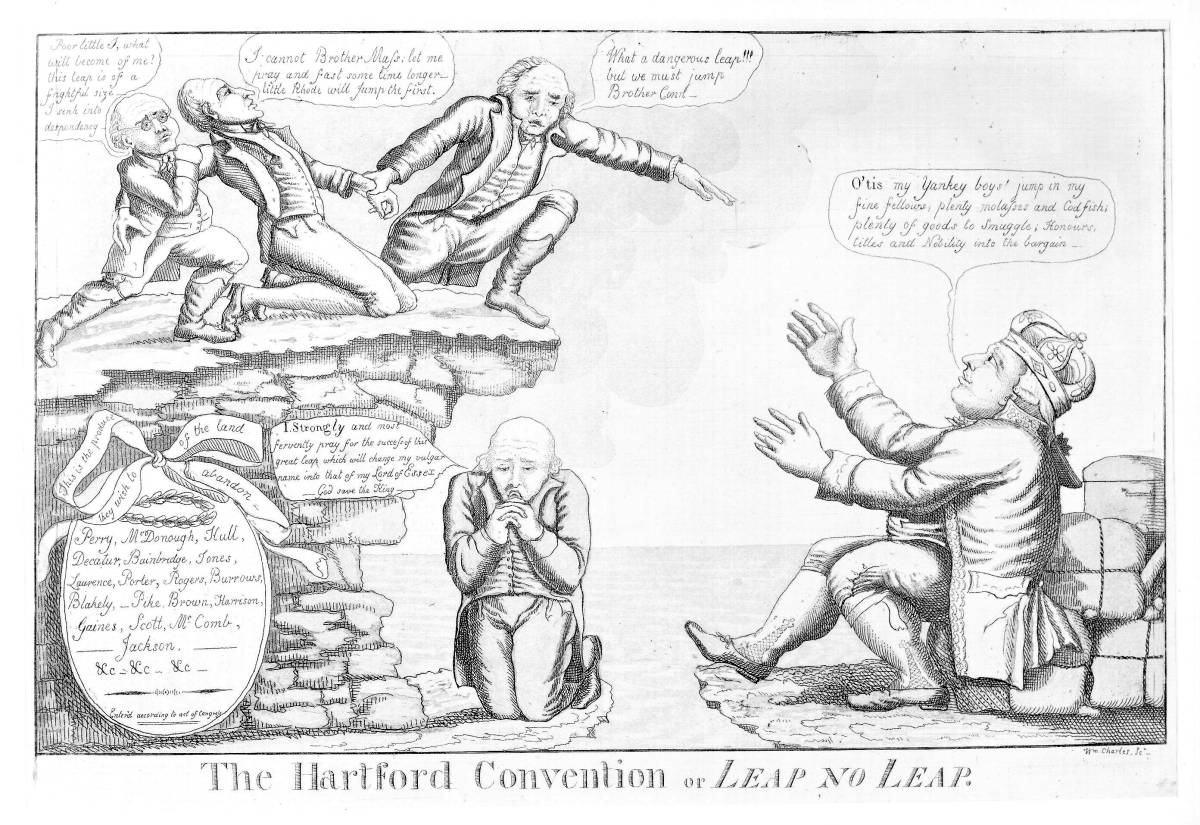
The Hartford Convention or LEAP NO LEAP, by William Charles.

The Democratic-Republican Congress would never have recommended any of New England's proposals for ratification. Hartford delegates intended for them to embarrass the President and the Democratic-Republicans in Congress—and also to serve as a basis for negotiations between New England and the rest of the country.

Some delegates may have been in favor of New England's secession from the United States and forming an independent republic, though no solution was adopted at the convention. Historian Samuel Eliot Morison rejected the notion that the Hartford convention was an attempt to take New England out of the Union and give treasonous aid and comfort to Britain. Morison wrote: "Democratic politicians, seeking a foil to their own mismanagement of the war and to discredit the still formidable Federalist party, caressed and fed this infant myth until it became so tough and lusty as to defy both solemn denials and documentary proof."

After the convention, Massachusetts sent three commissioners to Washington, D.C. to negotiate for the terms that had been agreed upon. By the time they arrived in February 1815, news of Andrew Jackson's overwhelming victory at the Battle of New Orleans, and the signing of the Treaty of Ghent, preceded them and, consequently, their presence in the capital seemed both ludicrous and subversive. They quickly returned home. Thereafter, both Hartford Convention and Federalist Party became synonymous with disunion, secession, and treason, especially in the South. The party was ruined and ceased to be a significant force in national politics, although in a few places (notably Massachusetts, where Federalists were elected governor annually until 1823) it retained some power.
