= Wanton–Lyman–Hazard House =

Historic house in Rhode Island

- U.S. National Register of Historic Places
- U.S. National Historic Landmark
- U.S. National Historic Landmark District – Contributing property
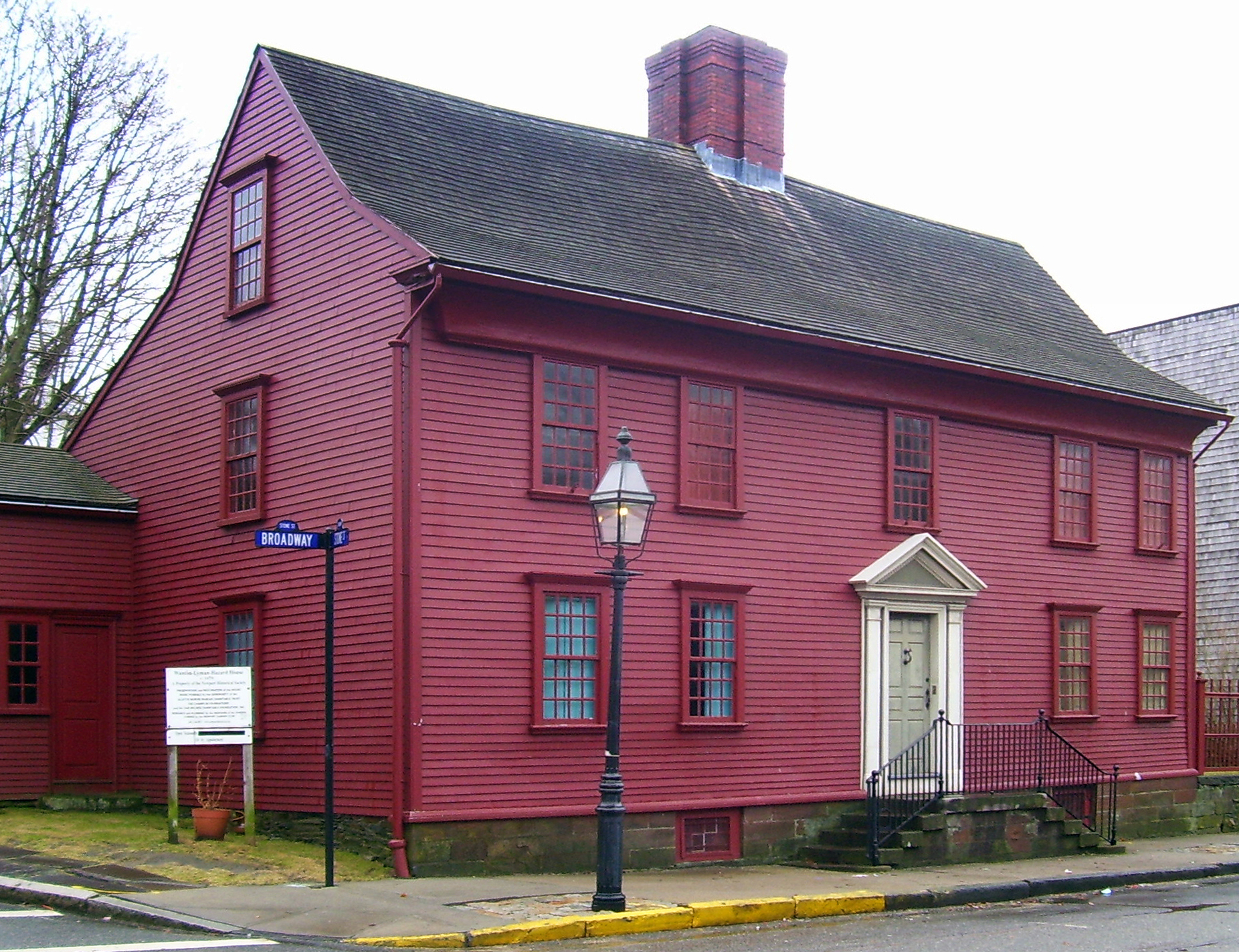
- Front elevation and side profile of house, 2008

- Location within Rhode Island Location within the United States
- Location: 17 Broadway, Newport, Rhode Island
- Coordinates: 41.49084°N 71.31261°W
- Built: c. 1697
- Architect: Stephen Mumford
- Architectural style: Colonial, Georgian
- Part of: Newport Historic District (ID68000001)
- NRHP reference No.: 66000016

Significant dates
- Added to NRHP: October 15, 1966
- Designated NHL: October 9, 1960
- Designated NHLDCP: November 24, 1968

The Wanton–Lyman–Hazard House is one of the oldest houses in Newport, Rhode Island, built around 1697. It is also one of the oldest houses in the state. It is located at the corner of Broadway and Stone Street, in the downtown section of the city in the Newport Historic District. The house "was damaged by Stamp Act riots in 1765 when occupied by a Tory Stampmaster."

The house has passed through several owners since its construction and has been renovated and improved by some of them. The three for whom it is named were not the first, but they were members of a family related by marriage that owned it from shortly before the Revolution to 1911. Since the 1920s, it has been owned by the Newport Historical Society (NHS) which renovated it and converted it to a historic house museum. In 1960, it was among the first National Historic Landmarks designated by the Department of the Interior.

== Building ==
Today the house is a five-bay wooden clapboard structure with a high peaked roof that slopes down in the rear and plaster cornice. It is painted a historic shade of dark red, except for a white door and entryway with pilasters and a small pediment.

== History ==
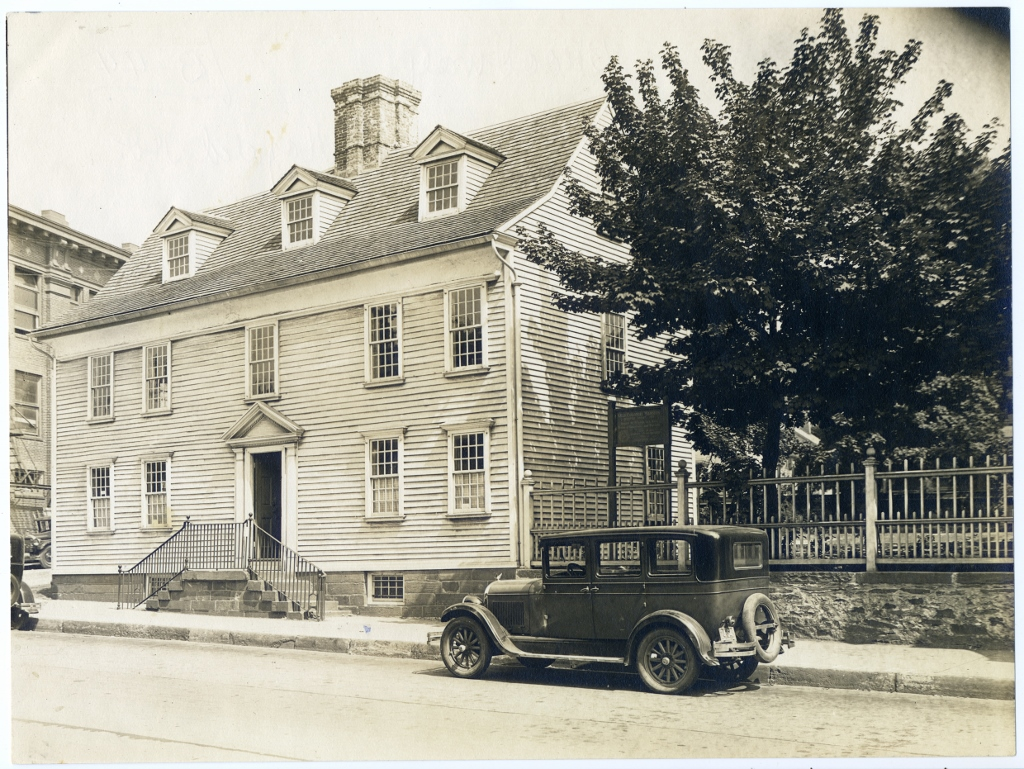
ca. 1920s

Merchant Stephen Mumford built the house in the late 17th century as a simple two-story structure with one room on either side of a central chimney. His son sold it to Richard Ward, a lawyer and governor of Rhode Island in the early 18th century. Sometime before 1725, a lean-to-styled kitchen was built on the north side of the house.

Loyalist lawyer Martin Howard Jr. owned the house afterwards. He decorated it with molding and paneling. He fled in 1766 following the Stamp Act Riots, during which he was hanged in effigy as a reaction to his co-authorship of a pamphlet criticizing the opponents of the Act for their disrespect to the Crown and Parliament. The house was slightly damaged by an angry mob. During Howard's ownership, the attic of the house was the living space for a number of African people enslaved by Howard, including Briston, Jenny, and Casen.

Quaker merchant John Wanton bought the house at auction later that year. Wanton enslaved a man named Cardardo who lived in the attic of the house during this time.

In 1782, his son-in-law Daniel Lyman inherited it. Three years later, he added the rear wing to accommodate his growing family. From him it passed to Benjamin Hazard, who had married another of Wanton's daughters in 1807. The Hazard family sold the property in 1911, after Benjamin's daughter Mary died. The building then fell into disrepair and remained vacant.

The house was "primarily" a residence until 1927, when the Newport Historical Society purchased and renovated it with the help of colonial architectural historian Norman Isham. He and the Society chose to renovate it in a combination of several of the period architectural styles which it had passed through. That resulted in removing the rear wing and restoring the upstairs bedroom to its original appearance.

The house was declared a National Historic Landmark in 1960.

In 1995, a Preliminary Historic Structure Report was done, allowing the historical society to get grants for another renovation and stabilization. The four-year project was finished in 2001. During that time, the NHS had also agreed to work with the Newport Garden Club to restore the original grounds and plantings. Archeological research conducted on the property for that project has led to some newer revelations about the house. Among them was an interior and exterior paint analysis, which has led to the house's paint scheme being adjusted. In 2005, a dendrochronology survey of the tree rings in the building confirmed a 1696 construction date.

In August 2024, the Newport Historical Society announced that it planned to raise $4.5 million to establish the house as a center for Black history, with permanent and rotating exhibits. It opened as the Edward W. Kane and Martha J. Wallace Center for Black History in June 2026.

== Gallery ==
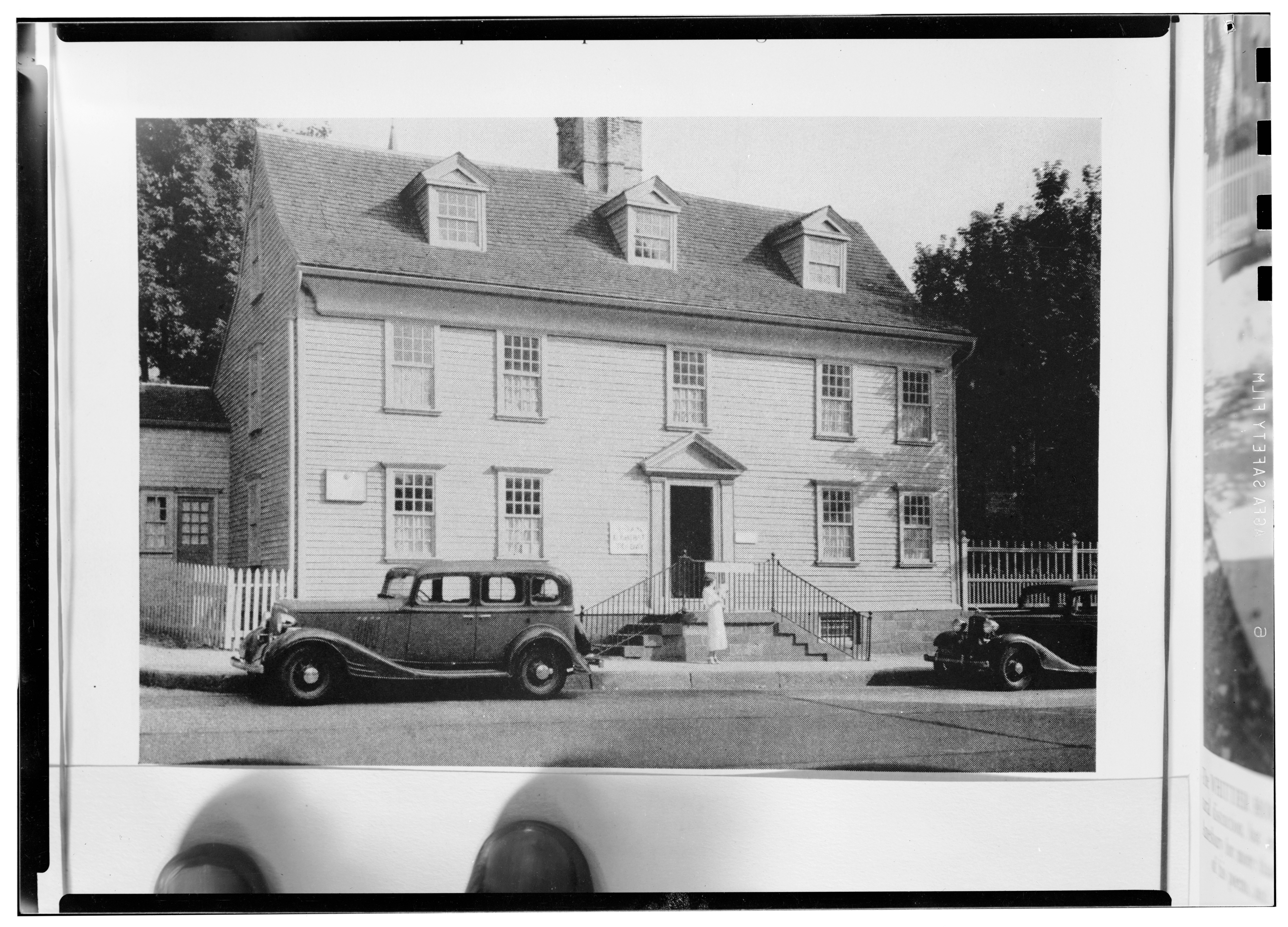
View from Northwest in 1937

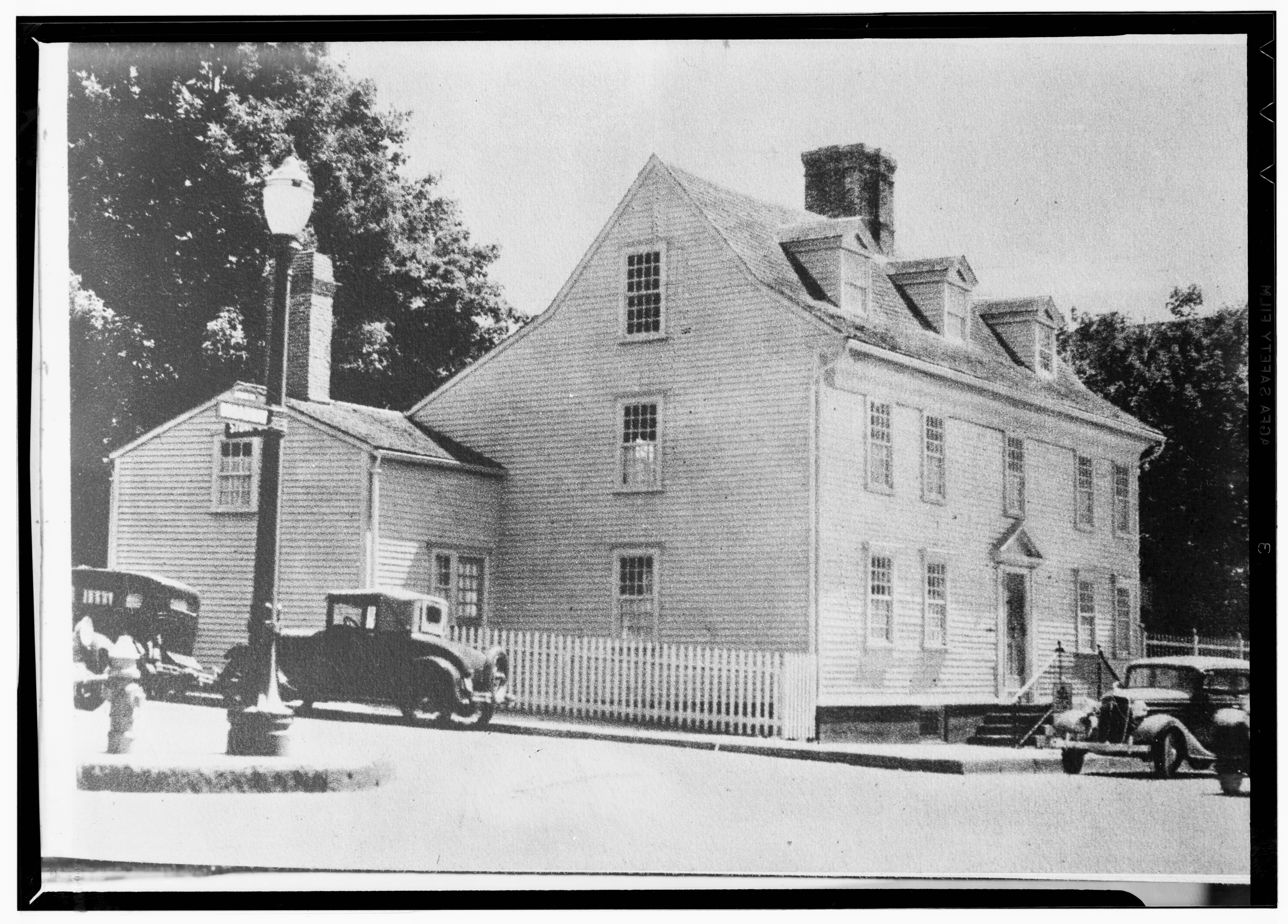
North and West elevations

== See also ==
- List of National Historic Landmarks in Rhode Island
- National Register of Historic Places listings in Newport County, Rhode Island
