= Life in Mexico =

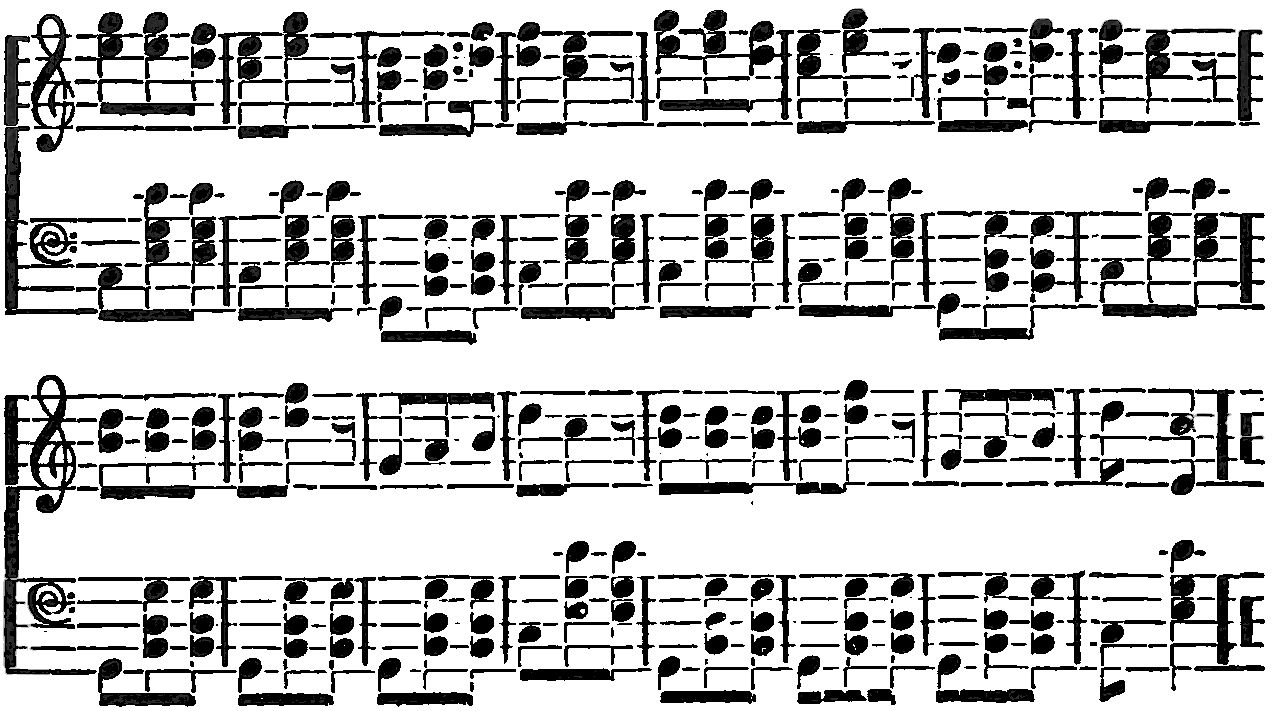
Life in Mexico, Volume 1 Los Enanos

Life in Mexico is a 19th-century travel account about the life, culture, and landscape of Mexico, written during Scottish writer Fanny Calderon de la Barca's sojourn in Mexico from October 1839 to February 1842. It was published in 1843 by historian William Hickling Prescott.

== Substance ==
The account itself, Life in Mexico, consists of 54 letters Fanny Calderón wrote during her sojourn in Mexico from October 1839 to February 1842. In terms of content, Calderón’s book includes her personal experiences of Mexico from the standpoint of an aristocratic lady, the wife of a Spanish diplomat, a position that allowed her unique immersion into Mexican culture. Her account covers both public and private life, although only the latter was thought to be the domain of women writers, as well as the politics, people, and landscape of Mexico.

== Publication ==
Originally, Calderón's letters were not intended for publication, but her friend, historian William Hickling Prescott, urged her to publish her writings into a travel book. With Prescott’s instrumental role in the publication of Life in Mexico, the credibility and authenticity of her account was elevated beyond that of an ordinary female travel narrative. Prescott praised her book for its ethnographical and historiographical significance, and even included some of her observations in his own work, The Conquest of Mexico, citing Calderón as the “most delightful of modern travelers”. His book was better received than Calderón’s, which came under Mexican scrutiny.

Her book was first published in English in 1843 in Boston by Prescott, and in London by Prescott’s friend, Charles Dickens, having been most likely intended for a “broad English-speaking” audience.

== Content ==
Life in Mexico provides insights on the inner social workings of Mexico, including class distinctions of Mexican women, perspectives on the Indians, and the chaotic political climate of the time and rising nationalism. During her time in Mexico, Calderón observed and recorded two revolutions, as she was caught in the political turmoil of the recently independent nation involving conflict between the liberal federalists and conservative centralists.

=== Politics ===
With sarcasm and irony, Calderón critiques the male-dominated society (“patriarchy”) associated with Mexican politics, effectively “demystifying” the male elite in a manner that stems from a strong sense of female identity. When describing a scene in which the president is captured, later escapes and the ensuring chaos that results, Calderón writes with a mixture of historical facts and personal reactions, including quotes of the men involved, which elevate her as a “locus of authority” in the narrative. She mocks the male elites and apologizes, but in recording the second revolution in “Revolution Again: Santa Anna Returns”, she discusses the primary political figures, no longer apologetic for speaking on politics, although the subject was considered to be outside of a woman’s sphere. In witnessing the revolution from the hacienda of San Xavier, she becomes more struck by the sight of ordinary people being forced to fight than the warring factions of significant figures involved in the political spectrum. She treats women as subjects in the scheme of this revolution, not “passive pawns” by recounting their escape amidst the bloodshed. Thus, she downplays the significance of the revolution by infusing it with everyday life and using irony to diminish the historical importance of violence. Overall, she is less interested in the top politicians than the statesmen and literary figures, in a sense representing the “underside of Spanish American nationalism” and demonstrating her female agency.

Her awareness of the political strife in Mexico solidifies her pro-Spanish view and belief in Mexico’s inability to run the country without Spain. This perspective is potentially connected to imperialism, and Calderón ’s view that Mexico’s maintenance of Spanish ties would promote progress. Coming from a Scottish and American background, Calderón is also prone to recognize the economic and religious systems of capitalism and Protestantism as solutions to Mexico’s internal problems, which might suggest an imperialist agenda.

=== Religion ===
Another one of these “problems” that Calderón criticizes in addition to politics relates to the Mexican Catholic church, specifically its treatment of women. In a section titled, “Life in the Convent”, she notes the oppressive confinement associated with the initiations of young women into the nunnery. Calderón’s moral outcry of this institution in its removal of female agency juxtaposes the more positive interpretations of the Catholic Church from the male perspective. Through irony, she contrasts the prison-like conditions of nuns, which include practices such as self-mutilation with a crown of thorns, to the relatively comfortable conditions monks enjoy. Her critique of patriarchy extends to her sympathetic descriptions of women in prison for murdering husbands who mistreated them, conveying an opposition to the cruelty faced by Mexican women.

=== Landscape ===
Irrespective of these assertions, Calderón also gives vivid depictions of the Mexican landscape, which are labeled by commentators as reflective of the “picturesque” Romantic sensibility typical of 19th-century writing. Despite her scientific knowledge as an educated woman of class, she subverts the male travel writing trope of astute observation of facilities such as the mining industry in favor of focusing on the natural scenery. In the vein of Romanticism, she fuses her historical knowledge of Mexico with personal experience, identifying with Spanish conquistador Cortés in her first impression of the ancient Aztec city, Tenochtitlán (modern-day Mexico City), describing it as an “intact, bustling, unruinous city”. By romanticizing Cortés as the discoverer of Mexico and the destroyer of Aztec immorality (human sacrifice), Calderón participates in this initial “discovery” herself, ignoring Cortés’ brutalities of conquest, and mythicizing the Mexican landscape as a Paradise comparable to the Biblical Eden through its sublimity. In doing so, she highlights Mexico’s “unexploited” resources, which would become part of the motivation for the United States' invasion of Mexico.

Despite her identification with Cortés, Calderón’s later description of Chapultepec implies a greater affinity for Cortés’ indigenous mistress, Malinche or “Doña Marina”, who held substantial political authority for a woman of her background. She is haunted by this woman, “ghost of Chapultpec,” a construct that Calderón created, which became an almost mythical tradition associated with Chapultpec. Speculation on this topic suggests that Calderón, being herself between Scottish, American, Spanish, and Mexican nationalities, might have identified with Malinche in terms of cultural displacement.

=== Class System ===
This transcendence of national identity along with her classification as an aristocratic lady also served an important role in informing her perceptions of the Mexican people. As the wife of a Spanish diplomat, she held the Spanish women of Mexico in higher standing than any other class, denoting a sense of superiority. In Calderón's Mexican caste system, the white women of Spanish nationality are considered “beautiful”, with this beauty diminishing with every class down to the Indians and remaining negroes of the country, who she deemed “ugly”. Additionally, Calderón’s role as the proper “lady traveler” makes her most comfortable within her own class, away from the beggars and Indians that constantly interrupt her narrative. She ultimately perceives Mexican racial diversity as a hindrance to Mexican progress and connected to their “uncivilized” nature. However, in the realm of self-discovery, Calderón admits to finding secret pleasure in the “barbaric” Mexican bullfights, although it is un-ladylike. Her other draws to Mexican culture despite her class status and in lieu of complicated national identity are evident in her preoccupation with Mexican concert balls and the dress of Mexican women of various classes, including the rebozo and sarape. One such garment, the peasant china poblana dress, related to both native and Spanish myths and having no single origin, interests Calderón so much, she herself desires to wear it, possibly due to her own mixed nationality and the anxieties caused by her adjustment to marriage and the “otherness” of Mexico. However, bound by male and class-dominated social strictures, Calderón is strongly advised against it for fear of a scandal related to the dress’ association with prostitution and the impropriety of it for a woman of her stature. In later defiance of the limits of the Mexican social code, she does dawn an indigenous-inspired headdress, as if reasserting her female agency.

Through her female identification and mixed nationalities, Calderón offers a perspective on post-independent Mexico that stands out as the only Mexican travel account of its time written by a woman.

== Critical response and impact ==
While Calderón’s Life in Mexico was initially well-received in Boston and London in part due to Prescott’s approval, it was ridiculed by Spaniards in Mexico and the Mexican press for its negative portrayals of Mexicans. In fact, Calderón’s account was considered to be so offensive, she was compared to Frances Trollope, a female travel writer who had conveyed her dislike for Americans and their customs. Part of the offensive nature of her narrative likely stemmed from the Scottish/European Enlightenment thought about the superiority of Europeans and the inferiority of de-colonized peoples.

On the other extreme, the account, with its detailed depictions of Mexican politics and landscape, along with Prescott’s Conquest of Mexico, provided the United States government with intel on Mexico that served as a prelude for invasion. The books were so influential that the United States government actually met with Calderón and Prescott themselves, which eventually proved to be instrumental in facilitating the military transactions that led to the Mexican-American War of 1846-48.
