= Benjamin Hazard =

American politician

- Born: September 9, 1774; Middletown, Rhode Island
- Died: March 10, 1841 (aged 66)
- Education: Brown University
- Occupations: Legislator and Attorney

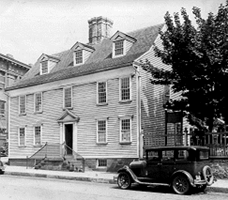
Wanton-Lyman-Hazard House in Newport in 1920s

Benjamin Hazard (1774–1841) was a Rhode Island legislator, attorney and member of the Hartford Convention.

Hazard was born on September 9, 1774, in Middletown, Rhode Island. He graduated from Brown University in the class of 1792 and later married Harriet Lyman, daughter of Daniel Lyman and Mary Wanton. Hazard then studied the law, and was admitted to the bar in 1796 and started a law practice in Newport, Rhode Island. In 1809, he was first elected a Representative from Newport and served as Speaker of the House from October 1816, to May 1818. Hazard retired from the Rhode Island General Assembly in 1840. He died in his Wanton-Lyman-Hazard House on March 10, 1841. Hazard was an active member of Trinity Church in Newport.
