= Edward Manton =

Edward Manton (1760-1820) was a delegate to the Hartford Convention in 1814-15.

Manton was born May 26, 1760, in Johnston, Rhode Island. Manton served as a presidential elector in United States Presidential Election of 1800. Manton "rarely mingled in the political discussions of his day. He was a man of sterling worth in every relation in life." He was elected as a delegate to the Hartford Convention in 1814-15. Manton died on September 20, 1820.

== References and external links ==
- Manton's Grave picture
