= Colegio Anglo Americano Prescott =

School in Arequipa, Peru

Coordinates: 16.42893°S 71.56025°W

Information
- Established: 1965; 60 years ago

Colegio Anglo Americano Prescott is a school in Arequipa, Peru, named after William H. Prescott an American scientific historian. The school was founded in 1965 by a group of British, American and Peruvian citizens; it retains its bilingual emphasis, maintaining a student exchange program with several English-speaking schools. As of 2018 Colegio Prescott offers an International Baccalaureate program.

== Founders ==
- Mary Burgess
- John Banks
- Gwynne Schultz
- Rosemary Latham de Barreda
- Samuel Lozada Tamayo
- Eduardo Bedoya Forga
- Werner Foulkes
- Arnolfo Valdivia Ampuero
- Allan Kelly
- Jeannette Ricketts
- Mrs. Rosemary Latham de Barreda
