= William H. Prescott =

American historian and Hispanist (1796–1859)

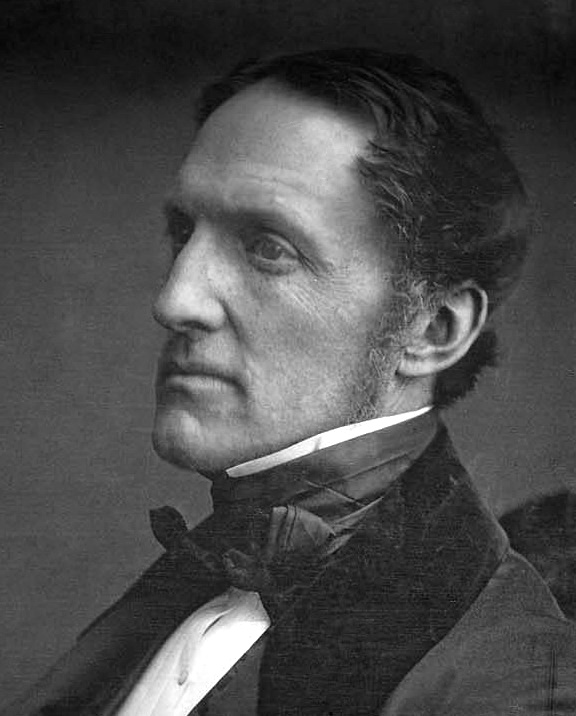
- Prescott c. 1850–1859
- Born: May 4, 1796; Salem, Massachusetts, U.S.
- Died: January 28, 1859 (aged 62); Boston, Massachusetts, U.S.
- Education: Harvard College
- Occupation: Historian
- Years active: 1821–1859
- Spouse: Susan Amory (m. 1820)
- Father: William Prescott Jr.
- Relatives: William Prescott (grandfather); Thomas Coffin Amory (father-in-law)

William Hickling Prescott (May 4, 1796 – January 28, 1859) was an American historian and Hispanist, who is widely recognized by historiographers to have been the first American scientific historian. Despite having serious visual impairment, which at times prevented him from reading or writing for himself, Prescott became one of the most eminent historians of 19th-century America. He is also noted for his eidetic memory, also called "photographic memory".

After an extensive period of study, during which he sporadically contributed to academic journals, Prescott specialized in late Renaissance Spain and the early Spanish Empire. His works on the subject, The History of the Reign of Ferdinand and Isabella the Catholic (1837), The History of the Conquest of Mexico (1843), A History of the Conquest of Peru (1847) and the unfinished History of the Reign of Phillip II (1856–1858) have become classic works in the field, and have had a great impact on the study of both Spain and Mesoamerica. During his lifetime, he was regarded as one of the greatest living American intellectuals and personally knew many of the leading political figures of the day, both in the United States and Britain. Prescott has become one of the most widely translated American historians and was an important figure in the development of history as a rigorous academic discipline.

Historians admire Prescott for his exhaustive, careful, and systematic use of archives, his accurate recreation of sequences of events, his balanced judgments, and his lively writing style. He was primarily focused on political and military affairs, largely ignoring the economic, social, intellectual, and cultural forces that historians have focused on in recent decades. Instead, he wrote narrative history, subsuming unstated causal forces in his driving storyline.

== Early life ==
Coat of Arms of William H. Prescott

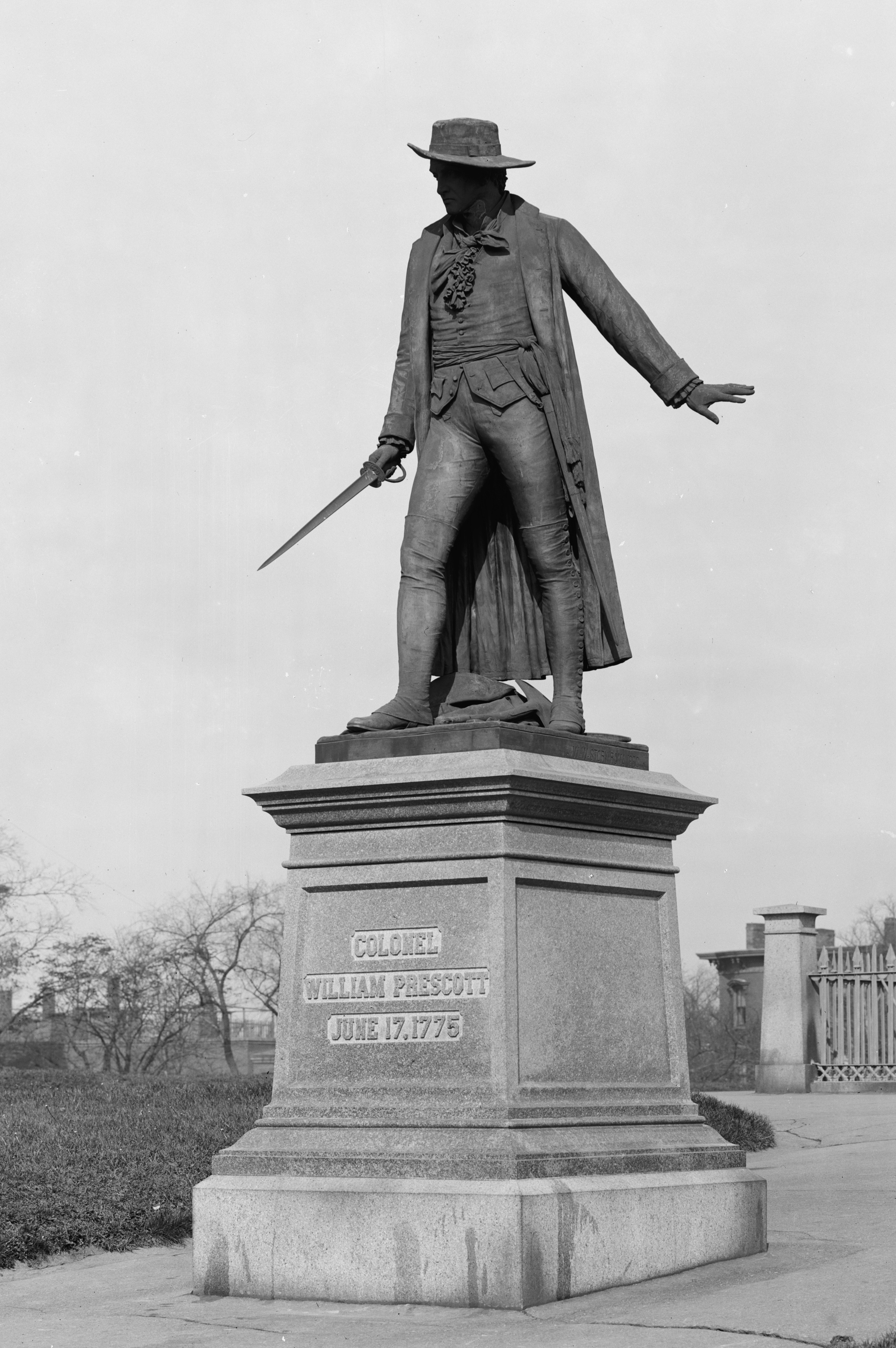
A bronze statue of Prescott's grandfather William Prescott in Charlestown, Massachusetts

William H. Prescott was born in Salem, Massachusetts on May 4, 1796, the first of seven children, although four of his siblings died in infancy. His parents were William Prescott Jr., a lawyer, and his wife, née Catherine Greene Hickling. His grandfather William Prescott served as a colonel during the American Revolutionary War.

Prescott began formal schooling at the age of seven, studying under Mr. Jacob Knapp. The family moved to Boston, Massachusetts in 1808, where his father's earnings substantially increased. His studies continued under Dr. John Gardiner, rector of Trinity Episcopal Church. As a young man, Prescott frequented the Boston Athenæum, which at the time held the 10,000-volume private library of John Quincy Adams, who was on a diplomatic mission to Russia. In 1832, Prescott became a trustee of the library, a position he held for 15 years.

Prescott enrolled at Harvard College as a second year student (sophomore) in August 1811, at the age of 15. He was not considered academically distinguished, despite showing promise in Latin and Greek. Prescott found mathematics particularly difficult and resorted to memorizing mathematical demonstrations word-for-word, which he could do with relative ease, in order to hide his ignorance of the subject. Prescott's eyesight degenerated after being hit in the eye with a crust of bread during a food fight as a student, and it remained weak and unstable throughout the rest of his life. Prescott was admitted to Phi Beta Kappa society as a senior, which he considered a great personal honor, and graduated from Harvard in 1814. After a short period of rheumatic illness, he embarked on an extended tour of Europe.

Prescott first traveled to the Portuguese island of São Miguel in the Azores archipelago, where his grandfather and Portuguese grandmother lived. After two weeks, he left for the cooler climate of London, where he stayed with the distinguished surgeon Astley Cooper and the oculist William Adams. Prescott first used a noctograph while staying with Adams; the tool became a permanent feature of his life, allowing him to write independently in spite of his impaired eyesight. He visited Hampton Court Palace with future American president John Quincy Adams, at the time a diplomat in London, where they saw the Raphael Cartoons. In August 1816, Prescott traveled to Paris, but later moved on to Italy, where he spent the winter. He returned to Paris in early 1817, where he chanced to meet the American Hispanist George Ticknor, and made another visit to England. Prescott spent some time in Cambridge, where he saw the manuscripts of Isaac Newton's works, and returned to the United States in the same year. Prescott's first academic work, an essay submitted anonymously, was rejected by the North American Review in late 1817. After a short period of courtship, he married Susan Amory, the daughter of American poet Thomas Coffin Amory and Hannah Rowe Linzee, on May 4, 1820.

== Career ==
=== Early career: The History of Ferdinand and Isabella ===
In 1821, Prescott abandoned the idea of a legal career because of the continued deterioration of his eyesight and resolved to devote himself to literature. Although he initially studied a wide range of subjects, including Italian, French, English and Spanish literature, American history, classics and political philosophy, Prescott came to focus on Italian poetry. Among the works he studied during this period were such classics as Dante's Divine Comedy and Boccaccio's Decameron. His first published works were two essays in the North American Review—both discussing Italian poetry. The first of these, published in 1824, was titled Italian Narrative Poetry, and became somewhat controversial after it was heavily criticized in an Italian review by Lorenzo Da Ponte, the librettist of Mozart's Don Giovanni. Prescott wrote a succinct reply to Da Ponte's fifty-page argument in the North American Review of July 1825. Da Ponte published the criticisms as an appendix to his translation of Dodley's Economy of Human life, which resulted in Prescott noticing them rather late.

Prescott first became interested in the history of Spain after his friend, the Harvard professor George Ticknor, sent him copies of his lectures on the subject. Prescott's studies initially remained broad, but he started preparing material on Ferdinand and Isabella in January 1826. His acquaintance with scholar Pascual de Gayangos y Arce helped him construct a sizable personal library of historical books and manuscripts concerning the subject. Alexander Hill Everett, an American diplomat in Spain, also provided him with material which was unavailable to Prescott in Boston. However, progress was stalled almost immediately, due to a sudden deterioration in Prescott's eyesight. Unable to find a reader fluent in Spanish, Prescott was forced to work through Spanish texts with an assistant who did not understand the language. When Alexander Everett heard of this situation, he provided Prescott with the services of George Lunt, who had adequate knowledge of Spanish for the task. However, this could only be a temporary arrangement, and he was replaced by a man named Hamilton Parker, who held the position for a year. Eventually, George Ticknor, who was by then in charge of the department of modern literature at Harvard University, found James L. English, who worked with Prescott until 1831.

Among the books studied by Prescott in this period, Ticknor lists Juan Antonio Llorente's Historia crítica de la Inquisición de España, Historia de los Reyes Católicos don Fernando y doña Isabel by Andrés Bernáldez, Voltaire's Charles XII and William Roscoe's Life of Lorenzo de' Medici, which were to be the sources on which the History of Ferdinand and Isabella was to be based. In spring 1828, Prescott visited Washington, where he and Ticknor dined with John Quincy Adams at the White House, and saw Congress in session.

Due in part to his own condition, Prescott was interested in aiding the blind and partially sighted. The Perkins School for the Blind, then known as the New England Asylum, had been founded in Boston, Massachusetts by Samuel Gridley Howe, Thomas Handasyd Perkins, and John Dix Fisher and 28 others in 1829. Prescott involved himself from the very start of the project, becoming a trustee in 1830. He published an article in support of education for the blind in the North American Review of July 1830, and helped to raise $50,000 for the organization in May 1833.

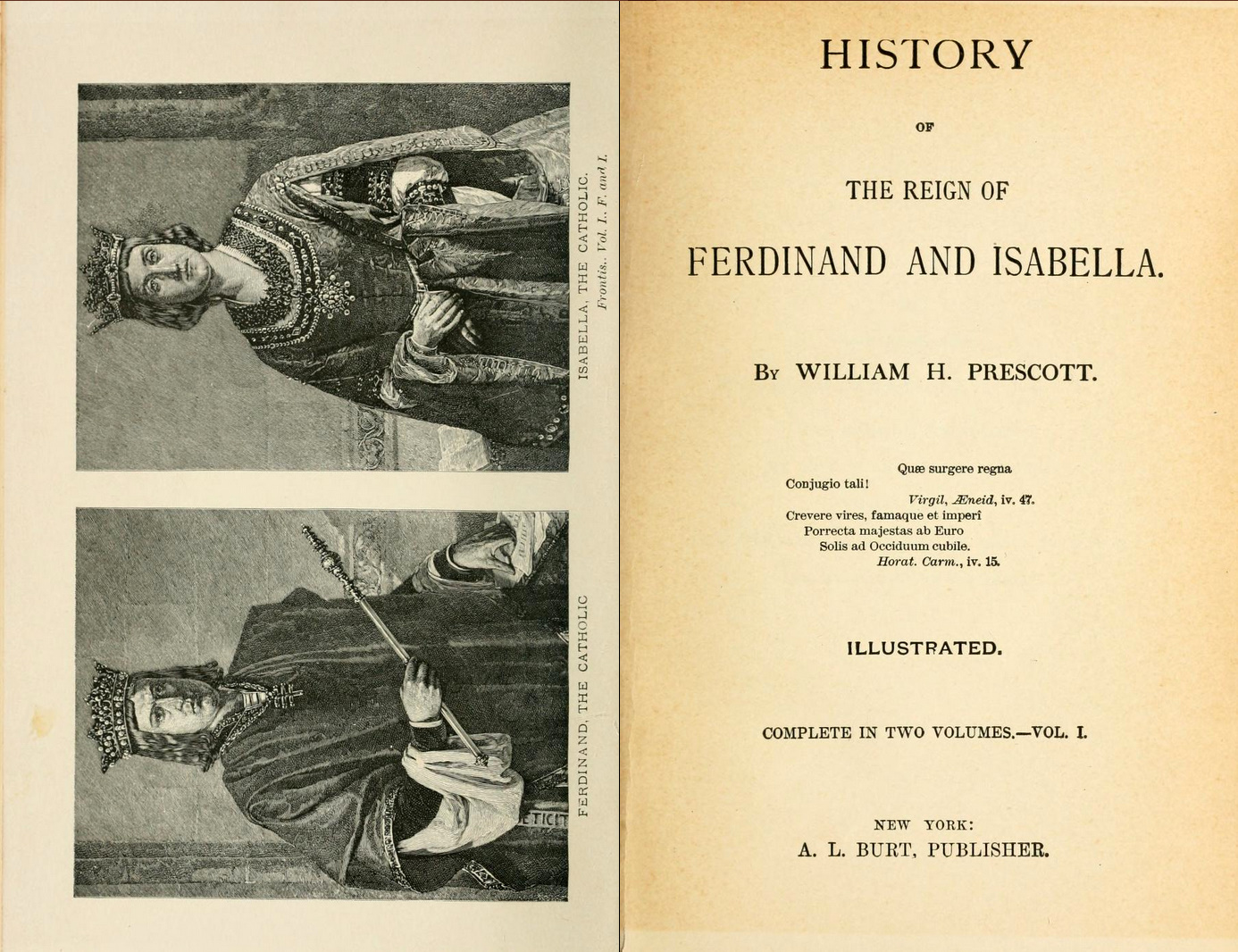
Title pages of the History of Ferdinand and Isabella, 1838 edition

His work was disturbed in February 1829 by the unexpected death of his eldest daughter, Catherine, who was only four years old. This led him to reconsider his position on religion—previously an agnostic, his interest in Christianity was renewed, and having read the Bible, the works of the theologian William Paley as well as more skeptical works such as Hume's Of Miracles, he came to acknowledge the "moral truth" of the gospels, while remaining opposed to the doctrines of orthodox Christianity. Despite this personal tragedy and his own continued ill health, Prescott had gathered sufficient material to begin drafting the History in October 1829.

At around this time, Prescott read the works of Gabriel Bonnot de Mably, including his historiographical piece De l’étude de l’histoire. He henceforth aimed to write history to de Mably's romantic ideal, and on more than one occasion expressed his indebtedness to him. Prescott also encountered Elogia de la Réina Doña Isabel, by his Spanish contemporary Diego Clemencín, which helped shape his views concerning the monarchs' political roles. Due to further problems with his eyesight, it took him sixteen months to write the first three hundred pages of the History. It was largely finished by 1834, but Prescott dedicated two years to abridging and redrafting it. He was also briefly engaged in writing a biography of Charles Brockden Brown for Jared Sparks' Library of American Biography. Prescott was not familiar with American literature, and he based the work on other contemporary biographies of Brown. As a result, the biography has had little academic impact. In 1835, he took residence in the rural town of Nahant, Massachusetts, due to concerns about his health. He was here accustomed to riding his horses for the purpose of exercise, and he persevered even in sub-zero temperatures.

Prescott finished the concluding chapter of the work in July 1836, and despite the amount of time and effort which he had spent on the work, was at first unsure about publishing it. However, his father argued that refusing to do so would amount to cowardice, and this swayed him. Prescott had previously considered publishing the work in London first, and therefore a printed draft copy of the work was sent to a Colonel Aspinwall for consideration. However, both Longman and Murray, which were at the time the leading British publishers, refused the work, and Prescott decided to postpone.

The History of Ferdinand and Isabella was published on Christmas Day, 1837 by the American Stationery Company, Boston, with a print run of 500 copies. It was dedicated to his father. To the surprise of Prescott and the publisher, the book sold very well—the original print run was insufficient to adequately supply Boston's bookshops, let alone the whole nation's. It was first published in London by Richard Bentley in early 1838. The work received excellent critical reviews, both in America and in Britain, where Henry Vassall-Fox and Robert Southey expressed their admiration of the work. It was also noticed in France, despite the fact that a French translation was not available at the time. Prescott was adamant that his work should not be altered by anyone other than himself, and when he heard that his publishers were considering an abridgement of the History of Ferdinand and Isabella in June 1839, he produced an abridgement of the work himself, which resulted in the original project's cancellation. He was elected a member of the American Antiquarian Society in May 1839.

=== The History of the Conquest of Mexico ===
Prescott expressed interest in his correspondence in writing a biography of Molière, and Ticknor records that he sent Prescott "a collection of about 50 volumes" of relevant material. However, after writing to Ángel Calderón de la Barca, a Spanish minister living in Mexico, and his wife Fanny who were able to provide source material, Prescott started research on what was to become the History of the Conquest of Mexico. He extensively read the works of Alexander von Humboldt, who had written on Mesoamerica, and started corresponding with the historian Washington Irving, the Swiss writer Sismondi and the French historian Jacques Nicolas Augustin Thierry. He also received assistance in collecting sources from a college friend, Middleton, and a Dr. Lembke. In contrast to the lengthy time spent researching the History of Ferdinand and Isabella, Prescott started drafting the History of the Conquest of Mexico in October 1839. However, Prescott faced difficulties in writing the work, which he had not encountered previously. There was relatively little scholarship on Aztec civilization, and Prescott dismissed much of it as "speculation", and he therefore had to rely almost exclusively on primary sources (with the exception of Humboldt). In particular, he considered Edward King's theory that the pre-Columbian civilizations were non-indigenous to be fallacious, although he was greatly indebted to him for his anthology of Aztec codices in the Antiquities of Mexico. Prescott also studied Spanish writers contemporary to the conquest, most significantly Torquemada and Toribio de Benavente.

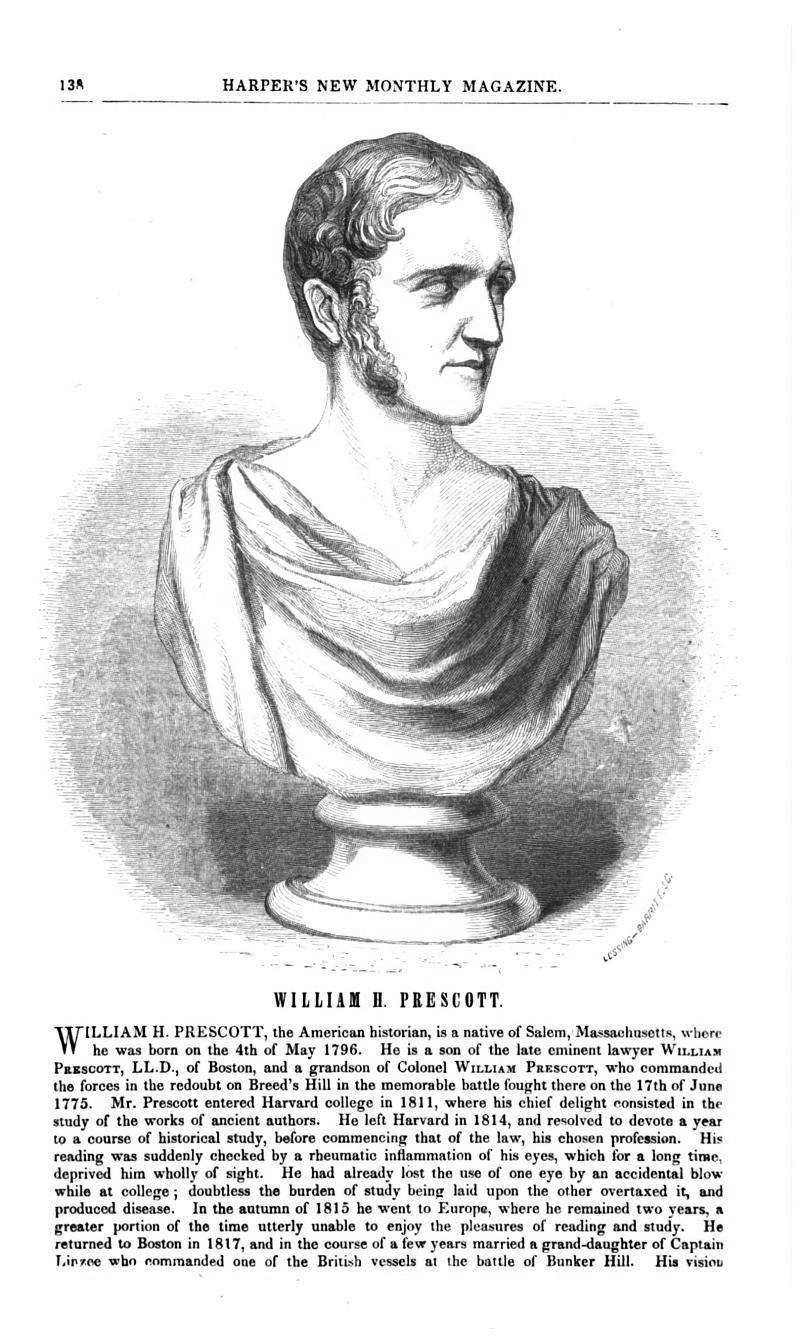
Depiction of Greenough's bust of Prescott in the June 1850 edition of Harper's new monthly magazine

Prescott received three honorary degrees in this period—an honorary doctorate in laws from Columbia University in autumn 1840, the College of William and Mary in July 1841, and South Carolina College in December 1841. He also helped Frances Inglis find a publisher for her autobiographical work Life in Mexico. Moreover, Frances Inglis was one of Prescott's most valuable correspondents during the writing of the History of the Conquest of Mexico. She is cited by Prescott five times throughout the text, and is described by him as "one of the most delightful of modern travellers."

Prescott found it difficult to evaluate Mesoamerican scientific and mathematical achievements because of his relative ignorance of those subjects. While working in Boston in 1841, he met George Howard, who was to stay a close friend for the remainder of his life. Prescott worked industriously throughout 1840–1842, and as a result, the work was finished by August 1843. It was published by Harper & Brothers, New York, in December, Bentley issuing the British edition. His elderly father had had a stroke in October, which resulted in temporary paralysis, so Prescott spent most of the winter attending him in Pepperell. The History of the Conquest of Mexico was received extremely well, both critically and by the general public, despite Prescott's fears to the contrary. Those praising the work included George Hillard in the North American Review, George Ticknor Curtis in the Christian Examiner, Joseph Cogswell in the Methodist Quarterly, as well as the Dean of St. Paul's, Henry Hart Milman in the Quarterly Review. However, the Mexican author José Fernando Ramírez was a critic of the work.

=== The Conquest of Peru ===
In 1844, Prescott was painted by Joseph Alexander Ames, and also commissioned a bust from Richard Saltonstall Greenough. He was not active in researching for the Conquest of Peru until spring 1844, although he had already decided to write a work concerning Inca civilization while researching pre-Columbian Mexico, and listened to Inca Garcilaso de la Vega's Comentarios Reales de los Incas. He further studied Pedro Cieza de León's Crónicas del Perú, the works of Pedro Sarmiento de Gamboa and Diego Fernández's Primera y segunda parte de la Historia del Piru. Prescott's progress was stalled by the unexpected death of his brother Edward at sea. His daughter Elizabeth was seriously ill, so Prescott and his family traveled to Niagara, which he considered a more healthy environment for her. After her recovery, they returned to Nahant in the summer, where Prescott started drafting the Conquest, and, as was his custom, spent the autumn in Peperell. Prescott's father died at the age of 82 on December 8, which deeply upset him. He took a two-month break from writing to support his widowed mother and settle matters concerning his father's estate. His father left numerous stocks, shares and property that amounted to $343,737, almost all of which was shared between Prescott and his sister.

Prescott was elected to the Institut de France in February 1845, in recognition of his accomplishments as a historian. He took the place of Martín Fernández de Navarrete, who had died the previous year, after a vote was cast. He was also admitted to the Prussian Academy of Sciences in Berlin. In the summer of 1845, a collection of articles Prescott had published in the North American Review were published as Biographical and Critical Miscellanies by Bentley in octavo, and an edition was also prepared simultaneously by Harper & Brothers in New York. Prescott was writing 12 pages of the work per day in the summer of 1845, and completed the first two chapters of the Conquest. He used the inheritance from his father to buy a house on Beacon Street in Boston. The building is now a National Historic Landmark, and is also known as the William Hickling Prescott House.

Prescott moved into the house during December 1845, and set himself a year to finish the Conquest of Peru. In March, his eyesight, which had recovered significantly, suddenly deteriorated. Prescott also had acute dyspepsia and rheumatism, and he travelled to Nahant to "benefit from the sea-air". This did not prevent him travelling to Washington, where he dined at the White House with President James K. Polk. He was also entertained by John Y. Mason, the former United States Secretary of the Navy, who informed him that a copy of Prescott's Conquest of Mexico had been placed in the library of every fighting ship. The Conquest of Peru was completed in March 1847. As with previous works, it was published by Harper & Brothers in the United States and Bentley in Britain. The original US print run was 7,500 copies, and the books were sold for $1 each. It was translated into Spanish, French, German, and Dutch, and sold excellently. As with his previous works, it was also well-received critically.

=== Research on Philip II ===
Shortly after the publication of the Conquest of Peru, Prescott turned his mind to writing a history of Philip II of Spain, which he had been contemplating for several years. John Lothrop Motley, who planned to write an independent work on the subject, was aided by Prescott, who gave him access to his library. Although the two corresponded, there seems to have been little collaboration on their respective works. Prescott had begun searching for sources as early as 1842, but several difficulties arose in his study of Philip II. The principal archives of historical material were held in Simancas, but neither Lembke (who had collected materials for the Conquest of Mexico) nor Middleton were able to gain access to them. They had been informed that the library was so disordered as to make productive research impossible, even if access had been gained. However, Lembke, who as a diplomat had been expelled from Spain, made the acquaintance of two wealthy Parisian scholars, Mignet and Ternaux-Compans, who offered him access to their manuscript collections. Furthermore, de Gayangos assisted greatly by locating important documents in the British Museum and in the collection of the bibliomaniac Thomas Phillipps, who owned around 60,000 manuscripts. He also borrowed several manuscripts from the archives in Brussels, having received letters from the respected Belgian diplomat Sylvain Van de Weyer in London. de Gayangos became Professor of Arabic literature at the Complutense University of Madrid in late 1842, and subsequently lent Prescott rare books and manuscripts from the university library.

By the summer of 1848, Prescott had over 300 works on the subject at his disposal, but he continued to have serious problems with his eyesight; an examination by an oculist confirmed that there was untreatable damage to his retina. Prescott had been commissioned by the Massachusetts Historical Society to write a biography of the scholar John Pickering in 1848, which he wrote for publication later in that year. Prescott was invited to write a history of the Mexican–American War, but declined, as he was uninterested in writing on contemporary events.

Prescott's main secondary source for the history was Leopold von Ranke's Fürsten und Völker von Süd-Europa im sechzehnten und siebzehnten Jahrhundert, a comprehensive work which included a detailed history of the papacy. Prescott admired Ranke's empirical historical method, and considered his work to be the best of his predecessors on the subject. He had four copies of the relevant sections of the work reprinted in a large typeface so he could read it without assistance. He had made a broad plan of the work by February 1849. Prescott started writing the draft on July 26. At this time, Prescott was a creditor of John White Webster, the chemist and murderer, and he was subsequently involved in his trial.

=== Visits to Washington and Europe ===
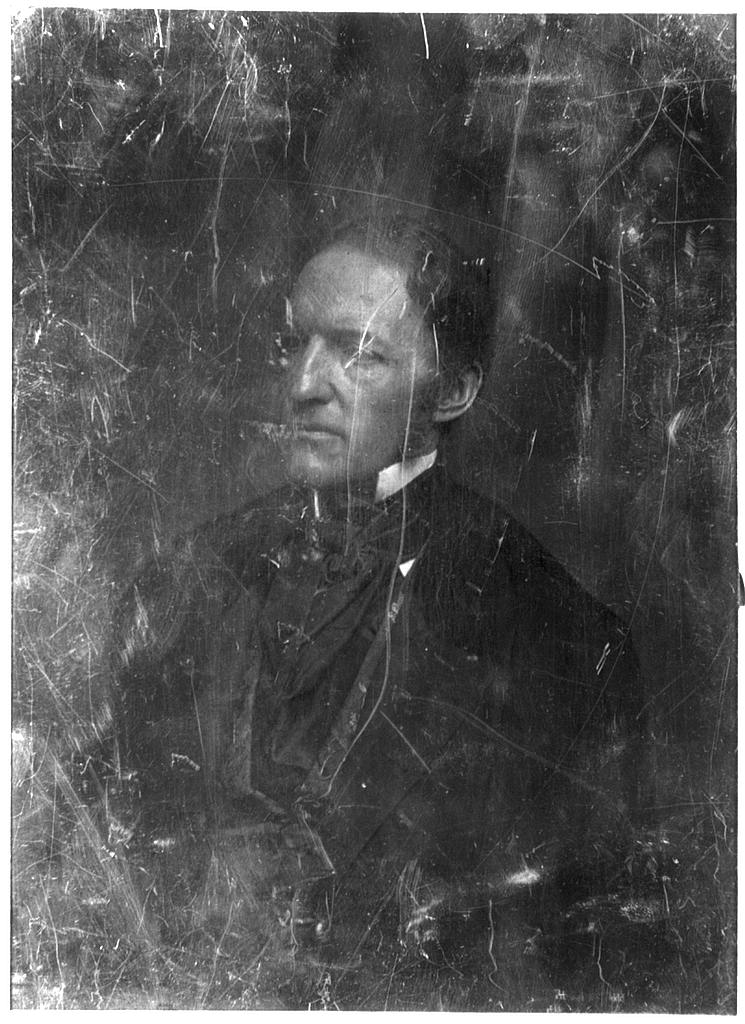
Daguerreotype portrait of Prescott by M.B. Brady, c. 1848–1850

Prescott visited Washington D.C. in spring 1850, where he met Zachary Taylor, then President of the United States, as well as numerous other prominent figures, including Henry Bulwer, the British ambassador, and Daniel Webster, the former Secretary of State, who had been a friend of Prescott's father. Soon afterward, he decided to visit England. He embarked from New York on May 22, and arrived at Liverpool on June 3. There he stayed with an old friend, Alexander Smith, and became reacquainted with Mary Lyell, the wife of the geologist Charles Lyell. He traveled with the Lyells to London, where they stayed in Mivart's Hotel. Prescott was greeted in London, as in Washington, by the most important members of society—he dined with the Foreign Secretary and future Prime Minister Henry Temple, the former Prime Minister Robert Peel, as well as the elderly Duke of Wellington. He went to the races at Ascot, and was presented at court to Queen Victoria.

On June 22, he traveled to Oxford to receive an honorary doctorate in law from the University of Oxford. There, he stayed at Cuddesdon Palace, the home of the Bishop of Oxford, Samuel Wilberforce, who was absent because of the christening of the infant Prince Arthur. Prescott met Spencer Compton, the president of the Royal Society, who was also receiving an honorary degree. He left London for Paris, where he arrived on July 20. Two days later, he traveled to Brussels, where he stayed in Coudenberg, the site of a residence of the Holy Roman Emperor Charles V, returning to London on July 29. Traveling north, Prescott visited Alnwick Castle and the ruins of Hulm Abbey in Northumbria. On his arrival in Edinburgh, he met the geologists Adam Sedgwick and Roderick Murchison, whom he accompanied to Inveraray, where he visited Inveraray Castle. Prescott then traveled south, through Staffordshire, where he was entertained by George Sutherland-Leveson-Gower. He embarked for New York on September 14, arriving on September 27.

=== Final works ===
Prescott spent the winter in Boston and returned to the composition of his work. He gradually changed the focus of the History, deciding that he was a better writer of history than biography and worked solidly for the next two years, alternating between Boston and Nahant. This period was interrupted only by the marriage of his daughter Elizabeth in early 1852. Her husband was James Alexander; they settled in a house near the family home in Pepperell. Prescott's mother fell ill on May 17 and died soon after, which caused Prescott to fall into a bout of depression that lasted until the winter. He returned to his work and continued at the pace that he was able through the remainder of 1852 and 1853, which passed uneventfully. Prescott started to suffer seriously from rheumatism during the previous year, and as a result, he abandoned his residence at Nahant. He bought a house in the then rural town of Lynn, Massachusetts, where he was visited by Charles Lyell and his family in June 1853.

On August 22, he finished the second volume of the History. The first two volumes were finished by May 1855, but not immediately published. Changes in British copyright law and a change of publishers caused Prescott to delay publication until November. Compared to his previous works, the History received little coverage in the press or academic journals. It was suggested to him at this time that he should write a biography of Charles V, but he declined, as he regarded the work of William Robertson on the subject to be definitive. However, he wrote an appendix to Robertson's The History of the reign of Charles V in May 1855; it was published in December 1856. Previously uninterested in politics (although he had predicted the Whig victory in 1840,) Prescott supported and voted for the Republican John C. Frémont in the 1856 Presidential election. He continued to work on the third volume of the History until he had a stroke on February 3, 1858. Prescott recovered, but his health was permanently affected, and he decided to temporarily retire from writing. The third volume was therefore published in April, and its scope was more limited than Prescott had originally planned. He worked on the Spanish translation of the Conquest of Mexico, which had been prepared by José Fernando Ramírez and Lucas Alamán.

== Reception and impact ==
Prescott's work has remained popular and influential to the present day, and his meticulous use of sources, bibliographical citations and critical notes was unprecedented among American historians. As the work of an amateur historian, the History of Ferdinand and Isabella was an outstanding achievement, and it arguably was the best English-language work on the subject published until then. The major problems with the work for the modern-day historian are not related to the quality of the research or Prescott's understanding of the period, but rather that his focus is on the major political and military events as opposed to social and economic conditions. It has also been argued that Prescott partially subscribed to the Great Man theory. The Conquest of Mexico has endured more than any other of Prescott's work: it is regarded as his greatest literary accomplishment. However, modern scholarship agrees that there are problems with Prescott's characterization of the conquest. David Levin has argued that the Conquest shows "inadequate attention to detail" and remains a broad and general account of events. In contrast to the Conquest of Mexico, the Conquest of Peru has received relatively little modern scholarly attention, perhaps due to some key similarities in style and structure. However, it is generally thought that the work was the authoritative account until the 20th century, and that Prescott used a broader range of source material than any previous writer on the subject.

The archaeological and anthropological aspects of both works have been heavily criticized by historians since the end of the 19th century. Prescott had never visited archaeological sites in Mesoamerica, and his understanding of Inca and Aztec culture was weak. In defense of Prescott, it has been argued that despite advances in archaeological understanding and a reconceptualization of the nature of pre-Columbian society, the works remain broadly historically accurate, and Prescott's elaborations on fact were due to a fundamental lack of source material. In contrast, Phillip the Second is considered essentially an inferior piece—it lacks the epic structure and literary merits of Prescott's other work, and the work has not received more critical attention than other contemporary accounts of the monarch's life.

Historian Richard Kagan has identified "Prescott's Paradigm" as a 19th-century interpretive model first fully articulated by Prescott. It argues that Spain's early modern 'decline' and subsequent 'torpor' was a product of its religious bigotry and political despotism. The Prescott's Paradigm was dominant in 20th-century American historiography but showed signs of decline by the 1990s. Kagan wrote:

What I call "Prescott's paradigm" is an understanding of Spain as the antithesis of the United States. Most of the elements contained in this paradigm—anti-Catholicism, criticism of absolutism, support for commerce and individual liberty—were to be found in the work of other writers, but Prescott bundled them into a single package that offered a means of approaching Spanish history through the lens of that of U.S. history.

== Personal life ==
After a short period of courtship, he married Susan Amory, the daughter of Thomas Coffin Amory and Hannah Rowe Linzee, on May 4, 1820.

William and Susan (c. 1799–1859) had four children; the first, Catherine Prescott (1824–1829) died of a childhood illness. William Gardiner Prescott (1826–1895) attended Harvard from 1841 to 1844 and worked as a lawyer in Boston. He married Josephine Augusta Peabody on November 6, 1851, and inherited Headquarters House. William Gardiner's daughter, Catherine Elizabeth Prescott, married Hebert Timmins on February 22, 1887. Elizabeth (1828–1864) married James Lawrence, a distant cousin. The youngest was William Amory (1830–1867).

In 1837, he was elected as a member of the American Philosophical Society. In 1845, Prescott was elected an honorary member of the Massachusetts Society of the Cincinnati.

== Death and personal legacy ==
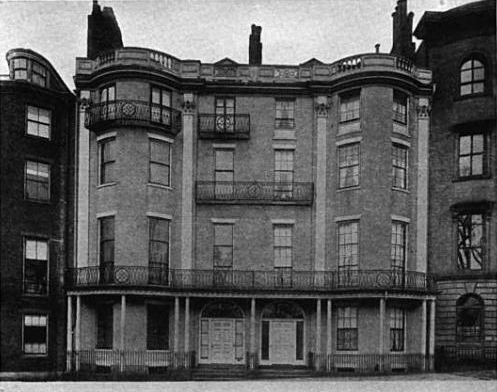
Prescott lived on Beacon Street, Boston, 1845–1859.

In January 1859, Prescott decided to resume his work on Philip II, with the goal of writing a final fourth volume History of the Reign of Phillip II (1856–1858) which was completed only up to the year 1568 featuring the deaths of Phillips son Carlos, Prince of Asturias and of Phllips 3rd wife Elisabeth of Valois. On January 28, he had a second stroke, which resulted in his immediate death. He was buried with his parents in St. Paul's Church, and his funeral was attended by representatives, among others, of Harvard University, the American Academy of Arts and Sciences and the Essex Institute.

There is a popular misconception that Prescott was completely blind, which seems to have stemmed from a misunderstanding of his comment in the preface to The Conquest of Mexico, in which he stated, "Nor have I ever corrected, or even read, my own original draft". The myth was further propagated by a contemporary New York review of the Conquest, and has been a common theme in popular accounts of his work. Other related embellishments of Prescott's disability have also occurred—Samuel Eliot Morison, writing in a 1959 article for The Atlantic Monthly, claimed that Prescott had an artificial eye, although there is no evidence to suggest this. It has been argued that Prescott's biographers have naturally been drawn to romanticize his life due to Prescott's own romantic style of history.

Four biographies of Prescott have been written. In 1864, George Ticknor published a biography based on Prescott's then-unpublished correspondence, to which the later biographers have been greatly indebted. Rollo Ogden's 1904 account is more a stylistic modernization of Ticknor's work. Harry Thurston Peck's 1905 account is considered academically inferior due to its essentially derivative nature. C. Harvey Gardiner's 1969 work is considered the definitive critical biography of Prescott, taking into account a wide range of unpublished documents that were unavailable to earlier biographers.

The City of Prescott in Arizona was named in his honor, as was the William H. Prescott House (Headquarters House), which was designated a National Historic Landmark for its association with him. Prescott School in Oakland, California was named for him in 1869. The school, in turn, was the source of the eventual name of the entire neighborhood, Prescott. William H. Prescott Elementary, established in 1899 and located in Chicago, Illinois, was named in his honor. The building is designated as "orange" on the Chicago Historical Survey, reflecting its historical significance. Colegio Anglo Americano Prescott, a school in Arequipa, Peru, also bears his name. In Lima, Peru, the avenue Avenida Guillermo Prescott in the San Isidro district is named in his honor ("Guillermo" being the Spanish equivalent of "William"). The future metro station Guillermo Prescott on Line 4 of the Lima Metro is named after this avenue. Prescott Street, two blocks from Harvard Yard in Cambridge, Massachusetts, is named after him.

== See also ==
- Spanish conquest of the Aztec Empire
- Spanish conquest of the Inca Empire
- William Hickling Prescott house, Beacon Street, Boston
