= William Prescott =

American colonel in the Revolutionary War (1726–1795)

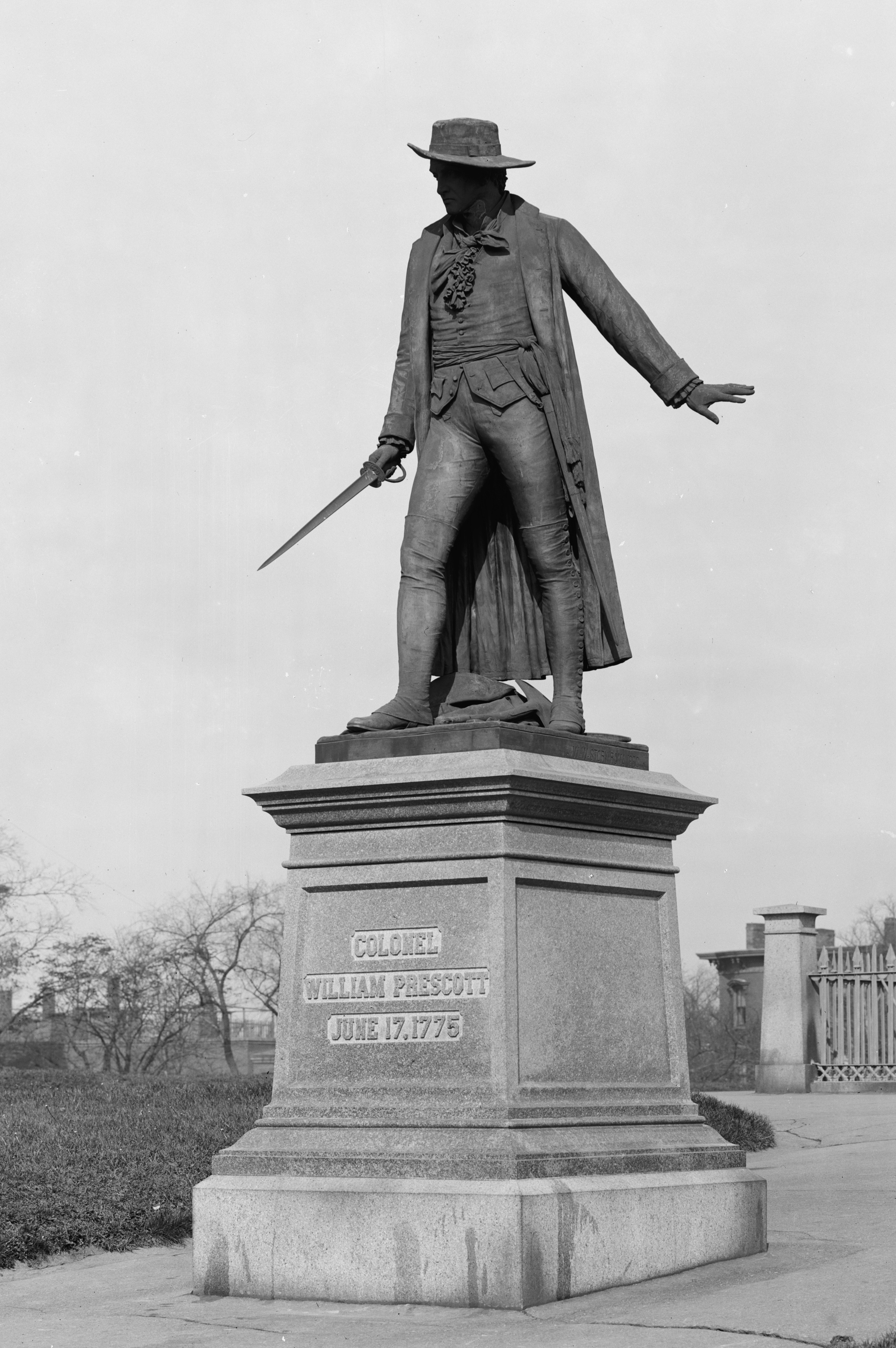
- Statue of Colonel William Prescott in Charlestown, Massachusetts
- Born: February 20, 1726; Groton, Province of Massachusetts Bay
- Died: October 13, 1795 (aged 69); Pepperell, Massachusetts
- Military career
- Allegiance: Kingdom of Great Britain; United States
- Branch: Massachusetts Militia; Continental Army
- Service years: 1745–1786
- Rank: Colonel
- Conflicts: King George's War; Siege of Louisbourg; French and Indian War; Battle of Fort Beauséjour; American Revolutionary War; Siege of Boston; Battle of Bunker Hill; New York and New Jersey campaign; Saratoga campaign; Shays' Rebellion

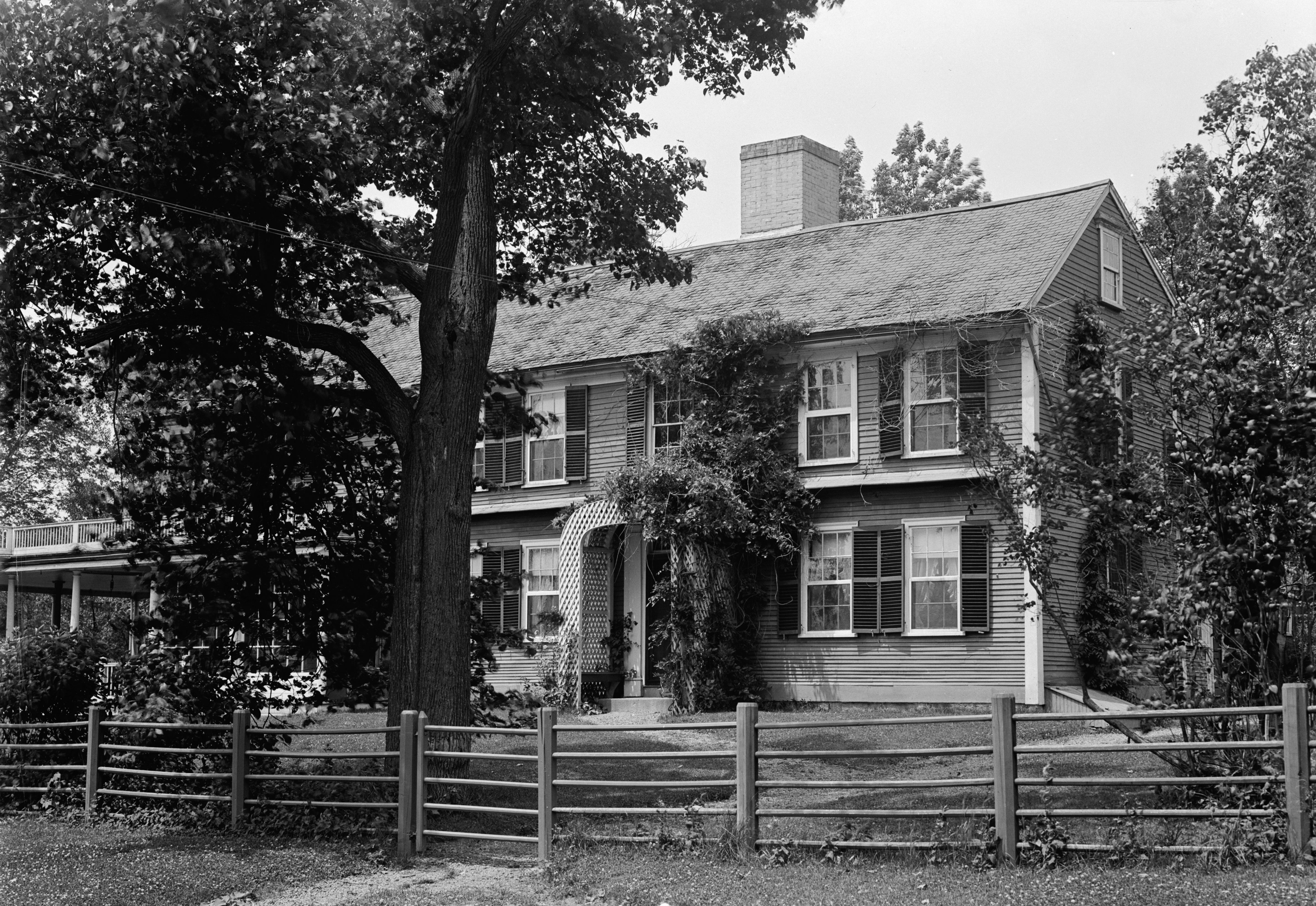
Colonel William Prescott's House (looking NW) in Pepperell, Middlesex County, Massachusetts. Photographed on June 18, 1941.

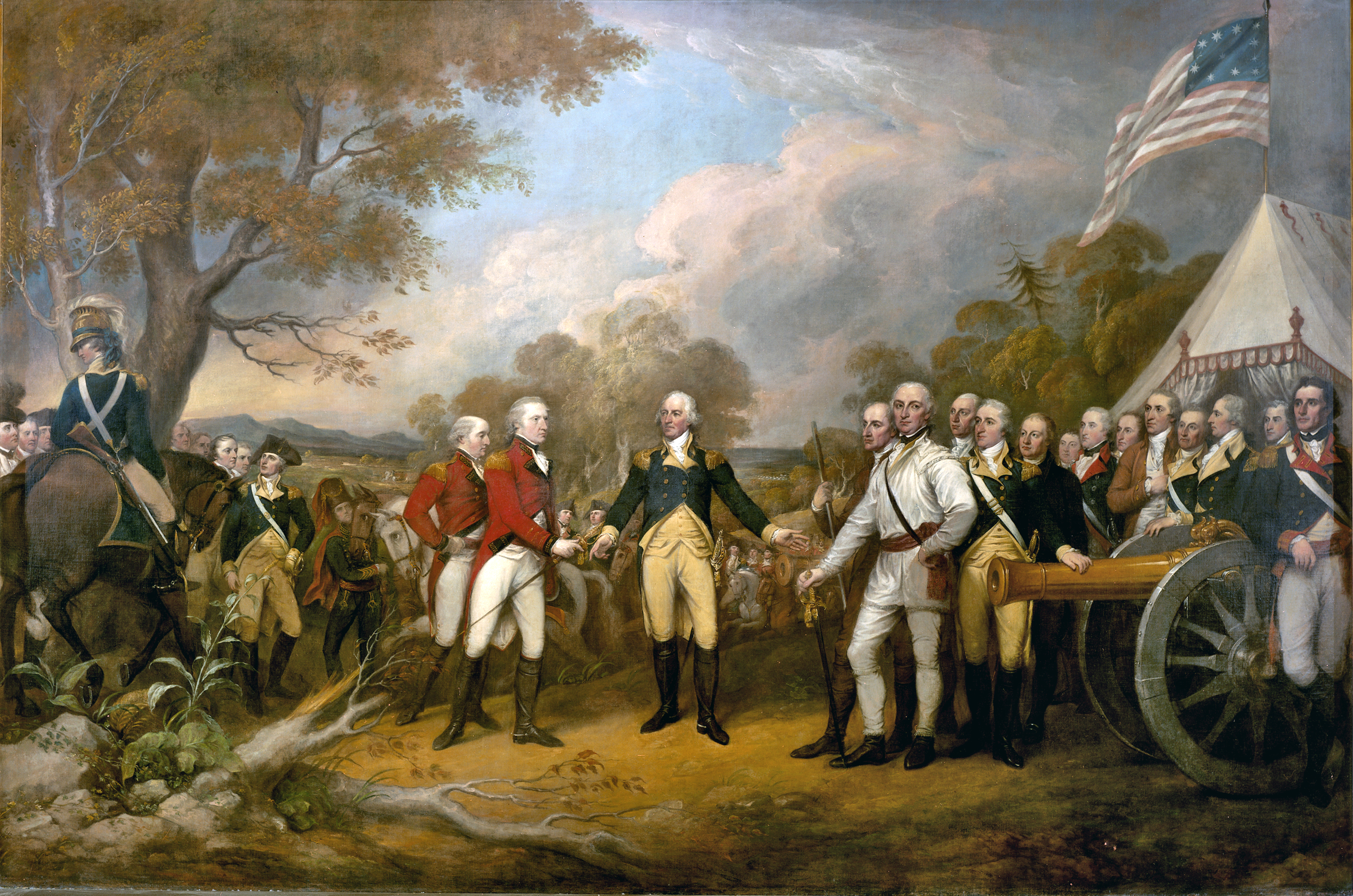
John Trumbull's Surrender of General Burgoyne. Prescott stands right of center wearing all brown, just behind Captain Morgan in white

William Prescott (February 20, 1726 – October 13, 1795) was an American officer in the Revolutionary War best known for his service at the Battle of Bunker Hill.

== Life ==
Prescott was born in Groton, Massachusetts to Benjamin Prescott (1696–1738) and Abigail Oliver Prescott (1697–1765). He married Abigail Hale (1733–1821) on April 13, 1758, and they had one child, who was named William Prescott Jr. William Prescott owned a house in Pepperell, Massachusetts, on what was later named Prescott Street. The town of his youth was then little more than a frontier settlement bordering upon Hollis, New Hampshire. In fact, the presence of hostile Indians was such a threat that many locals brought arms and ammunition with them while at work in their fields.

A prosperous farmer in his adult years, Prescott first gained military experience after joining the provincial militia during King George's War, where he served in the 1745 Siege of Louisbourg under William Pepperrell. Later, he served as a lieutenant in the Provincial troops which assisted in the removal of neutral French from Nova Scotia in 1755. After his return he married Miss Hale, as above, and was promoted to the office of captain. During the French and Indian War widened, he was acclaimed for his leadership of allied American forces in the Battle of Fort Beausejour. Offered a British Army officer's commission for his service in that war, he refused it and returned to managing his farm.

The now-disincorporated town of Prescott, Massachusetts, was named after him. He was the father of future Massachusetts senator William Prescott Jr., who fought with him at the Battle of Bunker Hill. He was also the grandfather of eminent historian William H. Prescott, after whom Prescott, Arizona, is named.

=== American Revolutionary War ===
In 1774, Prescott was appointed colonel of a regiment of “minute men”, enrolled in Pepperell and several nearby communities. After hearing of the “regulars’” (British) attack on Lexington on 19 April 1775, the alarm was raised that British troops were marching on Concord. The news reached Pepperell about 10:00 am. Prescott immediately gave orders for the company in Pepperell and the company in Hollis to march to Groton and thence to the scene of action.

Arriving before the Groton Companies were ready, the Pepperell and Hollis companies, after a short halt, proceeded on their way in advance of the Groton companies. Col. Prescott hastened ahead with as many of his regiment as he could collect to Concord and thence to Cambridge but did not overtake the retreating British troops. They arrived too late to participate in the day's battles, but they became part of the small army that laid siege to Boston afterward. He and most of his men enlisted for eight months, the period of the first enlistment.

When the American military commanders were alerted to British plans to capture undefended high ground at Dorchester Heights and Charlestown, Prescott was chosen to lead 1,200 men onto the Charlestown peninsula and erect defenses on Bunker Hill. The actual defenses were built on Breeds Hill, as it was lower and closer to the harbor.

"On the 16th of June, 1775, Gen. Artemas Ward, the commander-in-chief, issued an order for placing three Massachusetts regiments (Col. Prescott's, Col. Frye's and Col. Bridge's) and one hundred and twenty men from a Connecticut regiment (under the brave command of Thomas Knowlton), about one thousand in all, all under the command of Col. Prescott, directing them to proceed to Bunker Hill and there erect a fortification.

The detachment started from Cambridge Common at dark, proceeding silently to Bunker Hill. There, at about 11 o'clock pm, the troops commenced building the entrenchments as laid out by Captain Richard Gridley.

The breast work or redoubt was only constructed of such earth as the party had thrown up after the middle of the night and was not more than breast high to a man of medium height. Colonel Prescott being a very tall man, six feet and two or three inches in height, his head and shoulders and a considerable portion of his body must have been exposed during the whole of the engagement. He wore a three-cornered cocked hat and a ban-yan or calico coat. After one of his men was killed by cannon ball, Prescott, perceiving that this had made some of the soldiers sick at heart, mounted tile para-pet and walked leisurely around it, cheering his soldiers by approbation and humor. His clothing was repeatedly spattered with the blood and the brains of the killed and wounded.

The next day, his troops, who were tired from working to construct a redoubt and other defensive works, and had only limited ammunition, formed the centerpiece of the American defenses when the British attacked the position. The British began firing from the ship Lively at 4 a.m. and attacked at 3 p.m.

Prescott ordered the Connecticut men under Captain Knowlton to defend the left flank, where they used a crude dirt wall as a breastwork, and topped it with fence rails and hay. They also constructed three small v-shaped trenches between this dirt wall and Prescott's breastwork. Troops that arrived to reinforce this flank position included about 200 men from the 1st and 3rd New Hampshire regiments, under Colonels John Stark and James Reed.

In spirited battle, Prescott's men twice threw back British assaults on the redoubt. When the British made a third attempt, his men were almost out of ammunition; after an initial volley, he ordered a retreat from the redoubt. He was one of the last men to leave the redoubt, parrying bayonet thrusts with his ceremonial saber. The men on the left flank played a key part in the cover of the retreat.

Dr. O. Prescott Jr. saw the waistcoat and the ban-yan coat after the engagement, and they had several holes pierced by the bayonets of the British in their attempts at his life.”{The Prescott Memorial, Or, a Genealogical Memoir of the Prescott Families in America, in Two Parts pp. 56–58 by Prescott William 1788-1875} The Americans, although raw troops, fought with the bravery and obstinacy of veterans, until their ammunition was exhausted. Col. Prescott was always confident that he could have maintained his position, even with the handful of men under him, if he had been supplied with ammunition.

Prescott told General Artemas Ward, the Commander-in-Chief, that he would retake the place that night or perish in the attempt, if Ward would give him three regiments, with bayonets and sufficient ammunition. But from prudential reasons it was declined. While the British successfully captured Bunker Hill, the poorly organized colonial forces inflicted significant casualties. The British were unable to capitalize their victory and a third of the force commanded by General Howe was either killed or wounded.

Prescott is widely seen as having played a key role in the battle, keeping the relatively poorly trained militia under his command well-disciplined. As it was, however, the British were left in possession of the field, for they had carried the position at the point of the bayonet and technically the day was theirs.

Among the many Americans who distinguished themselves at Bunker Hill the names of Prescott, Putnam and Warren stand out most clearly. While General Putnam was on the scene at Bunker Hill by some writers he was not in the redoubt at Breeds Hill at any time during the action, but was attempting to direct affairs, to unit commanders who often misunderstood or disobeyed orders from that position. Joseph Warren, a Massachusetts politician and member of the colony's Committee of safety (American Revolution), volunteered to serve under Colonel William Prescott in the defense of the redoubt as a private and wanted to be close to the battle. It is during the retreat from the redoubt on Breeds Hill that Joseph Warren was killed.

When the Second Continental Congress established the Continental Army it sent George Washington to take command of the forces besieging Boston. Prescott received a colonel's commission, and his unit became the 7th Continental Regiment. The regiment saw service in the 1776 defense of New York.

While Prescott appears to have given up command of the regiment after that campaign, he apparently participated in some capacity in the 1777 Saratoga campaign, for he is depicted in the painting of the Surrender of General Burgoyne at Saratoga by John Trumbull, which hangs in the U.S. Capitol Rotunda.

In his person he was tall, with a large and muscular frame, but not corpulent, his features strong and indicative of intelligence. He was courteous and benevolent, and possessed a strong mind. Not having had the advantages of an early education he was most emphatically a self-made man. His departure from military service may have been due to injuries sustained in an accident on his farm.

=== Later life ===
Col. Prescott continued in the service until the end of 1776. He was stationed at Governor's Island, N. Y., until the Americans were obliged to retire from the city. In the autumn of 1777, he went as a volunteer, to assist in the capture of the army under General Burgoyne, which was his last military service. He was elected a member of the Provincial Congress held at Salem. After his retirement from the army he served the town as town clerk, selectman, representative to the General Court for three years, and was an acting magistrate for the remainder of his life. When Shays' Rebellion broke out, he hastened to Concord, and assisted in protecting the courts of justice and of preserving law and order. Prescott served in the Massachusetts General Court in later years. He also served in the militia called out in 1786 to suppress Shays' Rebellion. His brother Oliver Prescott was said to be influential in the suppression of that outbreak.

The following anecdote the writer had from Colonel Prescott himself: "While stationed with his regiment near New York in 1776, the out guards brought in a British deserter. As they approached the camp the deserter observed to the guards, 'That officer yonder is Colonel Prescott.' The guard informed the Colonel of the fact. 'How come you to know me?' inquired Colonel Prescott. 'I saw you on Bunker Hill,' replied the soldier, 'and recollected you immediately.' 'Why did you not kill me at that time?' asked Colonel Prescott. 'I tried my best,' said the soldier, 'I took deliberate aim at you more than once when I thought it impossible for you to escape. I also palsied at you several times with my bayonet when you were as near as I could have wished, and after several of us had taken possession of your works.' 'You are a brave fellow,' said Colonel Prescott, 'come into my tent and I will treat you.'" While on the retreat from the scene of conflict Colonel Prescott came to a house on Charlestown street, near the Boston Neck, where were three or four men who had just prepared a bowl of punch, and which they presented to Colonel Prescott before having tasted it. This, to a man suffering with fatigue and parched with thirst, was a most gratifying and acceptable offering. Prescott took the bowl, but before he had time to partake of its contents a cannon ball passed through the house, upon which the men immediately fled, leaving Colonel Prescott to drain the bowl by himself and at his leisure. Dr. O. Prescott further relates that Colonel Prescott was a true patriot. As a neighbor, kind and benevolent, and a peacemaker in to his vain, and was universally loved and respected. William died of dropsy of the chest, in Pepperell and was buried with military honors suitable to his rank, life and character at Walton Cemetery. He fell at a ripe old age, full of honors, and highly esteemed and respected. His widow died October 21, 1821, aged 88 years.

=== Opposition to Slavery ===
William Prescott never owned slaves, and spoke out against the practice of slavery. Prescott advocated that Massachusetts outlaw slavery. When Massachusetts did abolish slavery in 1783, Prescott celebrated publicly. Prescott was also outspoken about his praise for African-American soldier Salem Poor who fought with Prescott at Bunker Hill, going so far as to sign a letter to the court of Massachusetts praising his conduct in battle and advocating that he be rewarded for it.

== Legacy ==
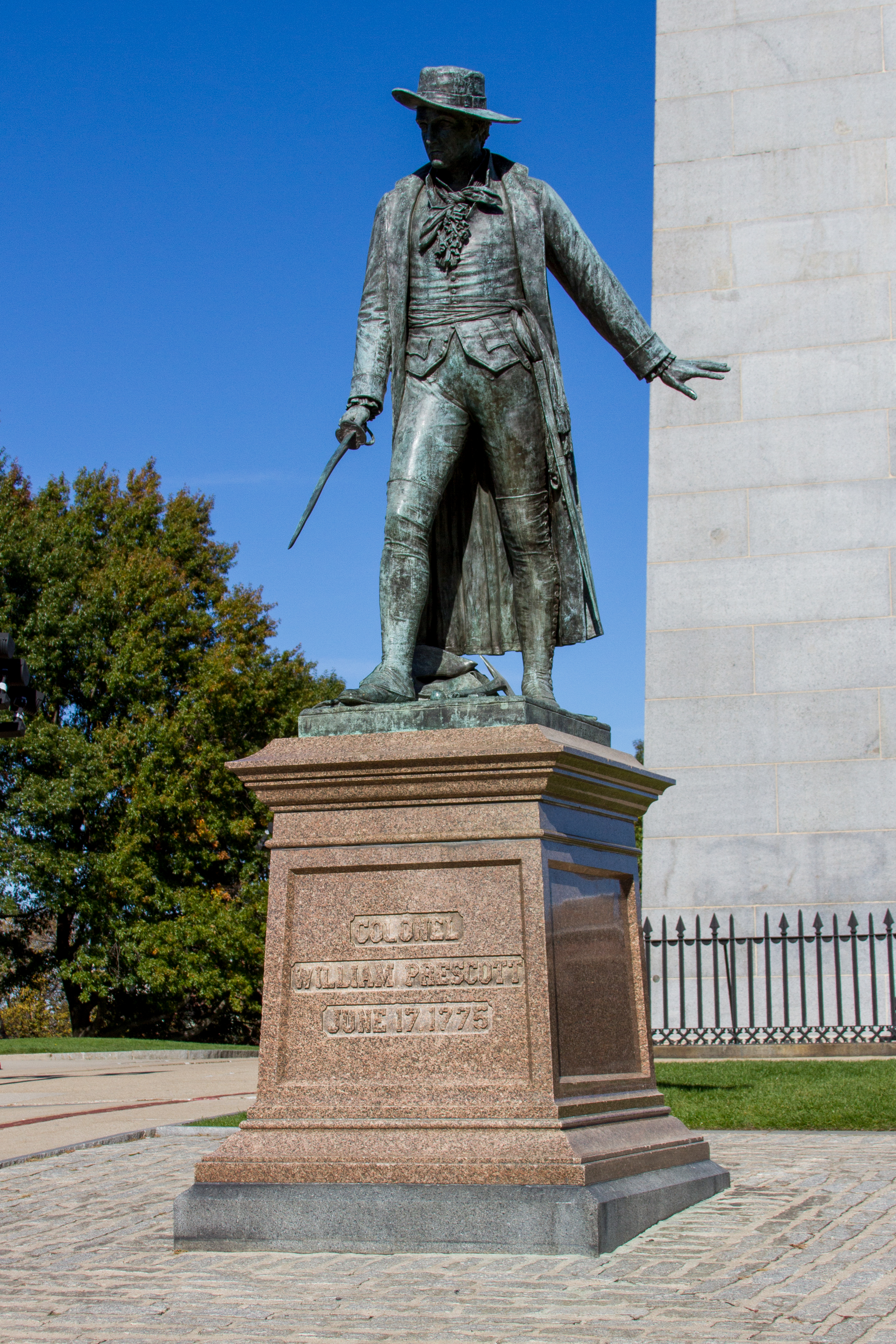
Col. Prescott's statue at Bunker Hill in Charlestown

Prescott's likeness was made into a statue for a memorial for the Battle of Bunker Hill in Charlestown, Massachusetts and was dedicated in 1881.

The former town of Prescott, Massachusetts, was named in his honor. The town was disincorporated in 1938 as part of the building of the Quabbin Reservoir, and the land now makes up Prescott Peninsula, which divides the main branches of the reservoir.

Colonel Prescott's famous order, "Do not fire until you see the whites of their eyes," is a significant part of the Schoolhouse Rock video and song, "The Shot Heard round the World."

In 1856, the Prescott School, named in his honor, was built on the northeasterly portion of the Bunker Hill Burying Ground in Charlestown, Massachusetts. The Prescott School later merged with the Warren School to form the Warren-Prescott School.

Prescott's house is located in Pepperell, Massachusetts.

Cambridge, Massachusetts, has a small granite monument to the place where, on the night of June 16, 1775, 1,200 Patriot men assembled and were addressed by Prescott and Harvard President Langdon, before their march to Bunker and Breed's Hills. See citation for picture of its inscription, which erroneously calls him a general. This monument is located on the lawn west of Harvard's Littauer Center, itself west of Harvard's Science Center, just outside Harvard Yard. See citation for location map.

However, Prescott Street, two blocks from Harvard Yard in Cambridge is not named after Colonel William Prescott, but after his grandson, William Hickling Prescott (May 4, 1796 – January 28, 1859). This grandson became a noted historian and author, who (in a remarkable moment of historical reconciliation) married the granddaughter of Captain John Linzee, captain of HMS Falcon, one of the British ships that fired on Bunker Hill Patriots. The city of Prescott, Arizona, is also named in honor of the scholarly grandson.

William Prescott Elementary School, in Scranton, PA, is named in his honor. Built in 1966, their mascot is the Patriots.
