= Nyctography =

Simple substitution cipher

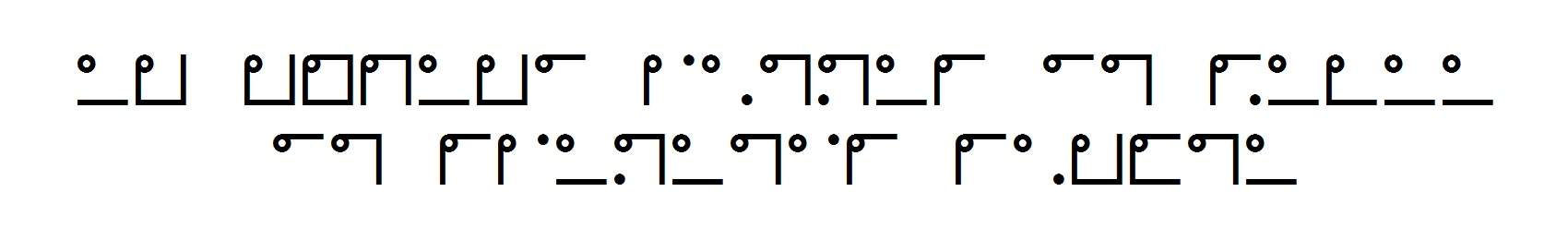
- In nomine Patris et Filii et Spiritus Sancti in nictography.
- Script type: Alphabet
- Creator: Lewis Carroll
- Created: 1891
- Direction: Left-to-right
- Languages: British English

Related scripts
- Parent systems: Latin alphabet: Nyctography

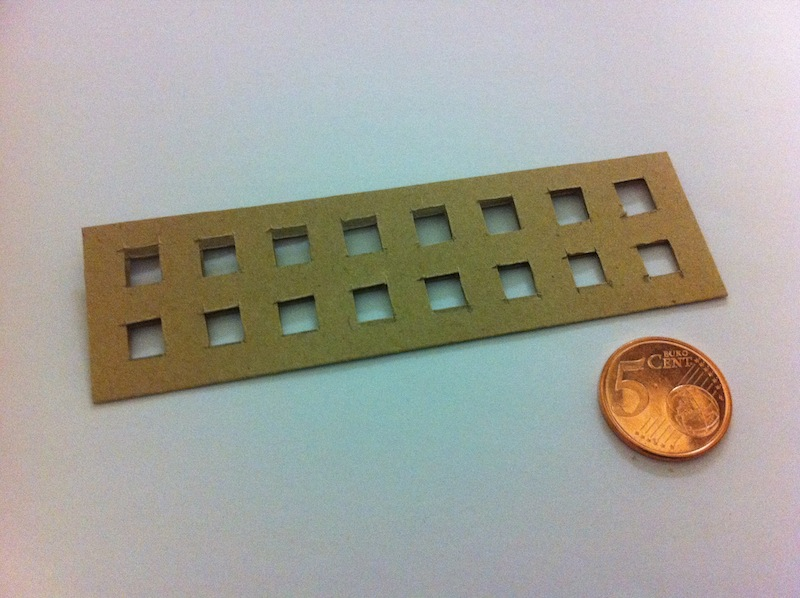
Reconstructed nyctograph, with scale demonstrated by a 5 euro cent.

Nyctography (in Nyctography:) is a form of substitution cipher writing created by Lewis Carroll (Charles Lutwidge Dodgson) in 1891. It is written with a nyctograph (a device invented by Carroll) and uses a system of dots and strokes all based on a dot placed in the upper left corner. Using the Nyctograph, one could quickly jot down ideas or notes without the aid of light. Carroll invented the Nyctograph and Nyctography as he was often awakened during the night with thoughts that needed to be written down at once, and did not want to go through the lengthy process of lighting a lamp only to have to then extinguish it.

== The nyctograph ==
The device consisted of a gridded card with sixteen square holes, each a quarter inch wide, and system of symbols representing an alphabet of Carroll's design, which could then be transcribed the following day.

He first named it "typhlograph" from typhlos ("blind"), but at the suggestion of one of his brother-students, this was subsequently changed into "Nyctograph" from nyctos (night)

Initially, Carroll used an oblong of card with an oblong cut out of the centre to guide his writing in the dark. This did not appear to be satisfactory as the results were illegible. The new and final version of the nyctograph is recorded in his journal of September 24, 1891, and is the subject of a letter to The Lady magazine of October 29, 1891:

Any one who has tried, as I have often done, the process of getting out of bed at 2 a.m. in a winter night, lighting a candle, and recording some happy thought which would probably be otherwise forgotten, will agree with me it entails much discomfort. All I have now to do, if I wake and think of something I wish to record, is to draw from under the pillow a small memorandum book containing my Nyctograph, write a few lines, or even a few pages, without even putting the hands outside the bed-clothes, replace the book, and go to sleep again. … I tried rows of square holes, each to hold one letter (quarter of an inch square I found a very convenient size), and this proved a much better plan than the former; but the letters were still apt to be illegible. Then I said to myself ‘Why not invent a square alphabet, using only dots at the corners, and lines along the sides?’ I soon found that, to make the writing easy to read, it was necessary to know where each square began. This I secured by the rule that every square-letter should contain a large black dot in the N.W. corner. … [I] succeeded in getting 23 of [the square-letters] to have a distinct resemblance to the letters they were to represent. Think of the number of lonely hours a blind man often spends doing nothing, when he would gladly record his thoughts, and you will realise what a blessing you can confer on him by giving him a small ‘indelible’ memorandum-book, with a piece of paste-board containing rows of square holes, and teaching him the square-alphabet.

From the description it appears that Carroll's nyctograph was a single row of 16 boxes cut from a piece of card. Carroll would enter one of his symbols in each box, then move the card down to the next line (which, in the darkness, probably, he would have to estimate) and then repeat the process.

== Nyctographic alphabet ==
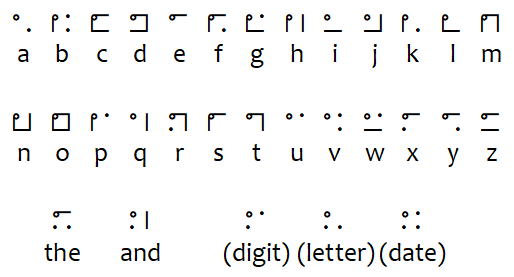
Lewis Carroll's nyctographic alphabet

Each character had a large dot or circle in the upper-left corner. Beside the 26 letters of the alphabet, there were five additional characters for 'and', 'the', the corners of the letter 'f' to indicate that the following characters were digits ('figures'), the corners of the letter 'l' to indicate that they were letters, and the corners of the letter 'd' to indicate that the following six characters were a date in DDMMYY format. There was no capitalization, punctuation or digits per se, though modern font designers have created them (e.g. capitals may be double-scored, punctuation marks may have the large dot at the bottom right corner, digits at the bottom left). Like in Braille, numbers were indicated by letters preceded by a digit character. The values were taken from his Memoria Technica, which assigned two consonants to each digit, with vowels unassigned, so that any number could be read off as a word.

Table of Nyctography characters and values
Letter	Character	Number	Notes
A		-	
B		1	first consonant
C		1	
D		2	for Deux
E		-	
F		4	for Four
G		9	
H		8	for Huit
I		-	
J		3	
K		8	
L		5	for Roman numeral "L" - 50
M		7	for septeM
N		9	for Nine
O		-	
P		7	for sePtem
Q		4	for Quatre
R		0	for zero
S		6	for Six
T		3	for Three
U		-	
V		5	for fiVe
W		2	for tWo
X		6	for siX
Y		-	
Z		0	for Zero
Word and function characters
Character		Value	
		"The"	
		"And"	
		numeric digit sign for following characters	
		letter sign for following characters	
		date indicator for next 6 characters DD/MM/YY	

== See also ==
- Pigpen cipher
- Night writing
- Graffiti (Palm OS)
