= 2010 European Karate Championships =

Karate competition

- Location: Athens, Greece
- Dates: 7–9 May
- Competitors: 475

The 2010 European Karate Championships, the 45th edition, were held in Athens, Greece from 7 to 9 May 2010. A total of 475 competitors participated at the event.

== Medal table ==
* Host nation (Greece)

Rank	Nation	Gold	Silver	Bronze	Total
1	Italy	4	4	3	11
2	Spain	3	3	2	8
3	Greece*	3	1	1	5
4	Netherlands	2	0	1	3
5	Turkey	1	2	2	5
6	Croatia	1	2	1	4
7	Azerbaijan	1	0	1	2
7	Germany	1	0	1	2
9	France	0	1	7	8
10	Serbia	0	1	3	4
11	Bosnia and Herzegovina	0	1	2	3
12	Slovakia	0	1	1	2
13	Czech Republic	0	0	3	3
14	Hungary	0	0	1	1
14	North Macedonia	0	0	1	1
14	Poland	0	0	1	1
14	Switzerland	0	0	1	1
Totals (17 entries)		16	16	32	64

== Medalists ==
=== Men's competition ===
==== Individual ====
Event	Gold	Silver	Bronze
Kata	(Italy) Luca Valdesi	(Spain) Fernando San José	(France) Vu Duc Minh Dack (Serbia) Dejan Pajkić
Kumite –60 kg	(Italy) Michele Giuliani	(Turkey) Ilyas Demir	(Croatia) Danil Domdjoni (Greece) Konstantinos Sidiropoulos
Kumite –67 kg	(Greece) Dimitrios Triantafyllis	(Italy) Ciro Massa	(Hungary) Adam Kovacs (France) William Rolle
Kumite –75 kg	(Azerbaijan) Rafael Aghayev	(Greece) Georgios Tzanos	(Italy) Luigi Busà (Netherlands) René Smaal
Kumite –84 kg	(Netherlands) Timothy Petersen	(Bosnia and Herzegovina) Alen Kupusović	(North Macedonia) Ognen Gruevski (Italy) Salvatore Loria
Kumite +84 kg	(Germany) Jonathan Horne	(Serbia) Dejan Umičević	(Italy) Stefano Maniscalco (Czech Republic) Tomas Reich

==== Team ====
Event	Gold	Silver	Bronze
Kata	Italy; Vincenzo Figuccio; Lucio Maurino; Luca Valdesi	Spain; Damián Quintero; Francisco Salazar; Fernando San José	France Czech Republic
Kumite	Turkey; Okay Arpa; Enes Erkan; Gökhan Gündüz; Yavuz Karamollaoğlu; Murat Salih Kurnaz; Yaser Şahintekin; Serkan Yağcı	Spain; Javier Badás; Ricardo Barbero; Matías Gómez; Óscar Martínez; Antonio Sánchez; Óscar Vázquez; Jagoba Vizuete	Azerbaijan Bosnia and Herzegovina

=== Women's competition ===
==== Individual ====
Event	Gold	Silver	Bronze
Kata	(Croatia) Mirna Šenjug	(France) Sandy Scordo	(Slovakia) Barbora Bosnyáková (Spain) Yaiza Martín
Kumite –50 kg	(Greece) Evdoxia Kosmidou	(Slovakia) Monika Višňovská	(France) Betty Aquilina (Turkey) Gülderen Çelik
Kumite –55 kg	(Italy) Sara Cardin	(Croatia) Jelena Kovačević	(Poland) Anna Fajkowska (Turkey) Serap Özçelik
Kumite –61 kg	(Spain) Carmen Vicente	(Italy) Laura Pasqua	(France) Lolita Dona (Bosnia and Herzegovina) Mirsada Suljkanović
Kumite –68 kg	(Greece) Vassiliki Panetsidou	(Turkey) Hafsa Şeyda Burucu	(France) Tiffany Fanjat (Germany) Silvia Sperner
Kumite +68 kg	(Netherlands) Vanesca Nortan	(Croatia) Ana-Marija Čelan	(Spain) Cristina Feo (Czech Republic) Radka Krejčová

==== Team ====
Event	Gold	Silver	Bronze
Kata	Spain; Fátima de Acuña; Ruth Jiménez; Yaiza Martín	Italy; Sara Battaglia; Viviana Bottaro; Michela Pezzetti	France Serbia
Kumite	Spain; Irene Colomar; Cristina Feo; Carmen Vicente; Cristina Vizcaíno	Italy; Sara Cardin; Roberta Minet; Laura Pasqua; Greta Vitelli	Switzerland; Jessica Cargill; Aurélie Magnin; Diana Schwab; Bettina Suess Serbia
