= 2011 European Karate Championships =

Karate competition

- Location: Zürich, Switzerland
- Dates: 6–8 May
- Competitors: 470 from 44 nations

The 2011 European Karate Championships, the 46th edition, were held in Zürich, Switzerland from 6 to 8 May 2011. A total of 470 competitors form 44 countries participated at the event.

== Medal table ==
* Host nation (Switzerland)

Rank	Nation	Gold	Silver	Bronze	Total
1	Italy	3	6	1	10
2	Spain	3	3	1	7
3	Greece	2	0	1	3
3	Switzerland*	2	0	1	3
5	France	1	4	7	12
6	Germany	1	0	3	4
6	Serbia	1	0	3	4
8	Turkey	1	0	2	3
9	Netherlands	1	0	1	2
10	North Macedonia	1	0	0	1
11	Croatia	0	1	5	6
12	Czech Republic	0	1	0	1
12	Russia	0	1	0	1
14	Austria	0	0	2	2
15	Azerbaijan	0	0	1	1
15	Belgium	0	0	1	1
15	Portugal	0	0	1	1
15	Slovakia	0	0	1	1
15	Sweden	0	0	1	1
Totals (19 entries)		16	16	32	64

== Medalists ==
=== Men's competition ===
==== Individual ====
Event	Gold	Silver	Bronze
Kata	(Italy) Luca Valdesi	(Spain) Damián Quintero	(France) Vu Duc Minh Dack (Serbia) Dejan Pajkić
Kumite –60 kg	(Italy) Michele Giuliani	(France) Johan Lopes	(Germany) Alexander Heimann (Turkey) Aykut Kaya
Kumite –67 kg	(Greece) Dimitrios Triantafyllis	(Italy) Ciro Massa	(Switzerland) Bajrami Kujtim (France) William Rolle
Kumite –75 kg	(Netherlands) René Smaal	(Italy) Luigi Busà	(Azerbaijan) Rafael Aghayev (Greece) Georgios Tzanos
Kumite –84 kg	(Serbia) Slobodan Bitević	(Italy) Salvatore Loria	(Sweden) Bleart Amagjekaj (France) Jean-Christophe Taumotekava
Kumite +84 kg	(Germany) Jonathan Horne	(Italy) Stefano Maniscalco	(Spain) Ricardo Barbero (Croatia) Pero Vučić

==== Team ====
Event	Gold	Silver	Bronze
Kata	Italy; Vincenzo Figuccio; Lucio Maurino; Luca Valdesi	Spain; Damián Quintero; Francisco Salazar; Fernando San José	France; Romain Lacoste; Jonathan Maruani; Jonathan Plagnol Turkey; Arslan Çalışkan; Orçun Duman; Metin Sofuoğlu
Kumite	Greece; Moulavasilis Dimitrios; Nikolaos Gidakos; Konstantinos Kountouriotis; Konstantinos Papadopoulos; Dimitrios Triantafyllis; Iraklis Tsamourlidis; Georgios Tzanos	France; Nadir Benaïssa; Salim Bendiab; Mathieu Cossou; Ibrahim Gary; Kenji Grillon; Lionel Nardy; Mickaël Serfati	Italy; Luigi Busà; Nello Maestri; Stefano Maniscalco; Ciro Massa; Salvatore Loria; Mauro Scognamiglio Croatia; Danil Domdjoni; Marko Lučić; Goran Lučin; Miroslav Maričević; Rene Pernuš; Alan Šurbek; Vinko Ursić-Glavanović

=== Women's competition ===
==== Individual ====
Event	Gold	Silver	Bronze
Kata	(Spain) Yaiza Martín	(France) Sandy Scordo	(Portugal) Patrícia Esparteiro (Croatia) Mirna Šenjug
Kumite –50 kg	(Turkey) Serap Özçelik	(Russia) Elana Ponomareva	(Germany) Desireé Christiansen (Austria) Bettina Plank
Kumite –55 kg	(North Macedonia) Natasa Ilievska	(Croatia) Jelena Kovačević	(France) Stephanie Barre (Slovakia) Monika Višňovská
Kumite –61 kg	(Switzerland) Diana Schwab	(Italy) Laura Pasqua	(Austria) Alisa Buchinger (France) Lolita Dona
Kumite –68 kg	(Switzerland) Fanny Clavien	(Spain) Irene Colomar	(Belgium) Laura Pradelli (Croatia) Ivona Tubić
Kumite +68 kg	(France) Nadège Ait-Ibrahim	(Czech Republic) Radka Krejčová	(Croatia) Ana-Marija Čelan (Serbia) Tamara Filipović

==== Team ====
Event	Gold	Silver	Bronze
Kata	Spain; Fátima de Acuña; Sonia García; Yaiza Martín	Italy; Sara Battaglia; Viviana Bottaro; Michela Pezzetti	France; Clothilde Boulanger; Céline Chevallier; Sonia Fiuza Germany; Franziska Krieg; Denise Pawlovski; Sabine Schneider
Kumite	Spain; Gema Alías; Irene Colomar; Cristina Feo; Cristina Ferrer	France; Lolita Dona; Tiffany Fanjat; Alexandra Recchia; Ruth Soufflet	Netherlands; Annemiek Borsje; Lydia Mossel; Vanesca Nortan; Ciska van der Voort Serbia; Branka Aranđelović; Ivana Čomagić; Sanja Cvrkota; Tamara Filipović
