= 2006 European Karate Championships =

Karate competition

- Location: Stavanger, Norway
- Dates: 5–7 May
- Competitors: 406 from 39 nations

The 2006 European Karate Championships, the 41st edition, were held in Stavanger, Norway from 5 to 7 May 2006.

== Medal table ==
* Host nation (Norway)

Rank	Nation	Gold	Silver	Bronze	Total
1	Spain	4	0	6	10
2	France	4	0	3	7
3	Italy	2	4	5	11
4	Turkey	2	3	0	5
5	Bosnia and Herzegovina	1	3	1	5
6	England	1	1	1	3
7	Germany	1	0	5	6
8	Serbia and Montenegro	1	0	1	2
8	Slovakia	1	0	1	2
10	Croatia	0	2	4	6
11	Belgium	0	2	0	2
12	Russia	0	1	1	2
13	Czech Republic	0	1	0	1
14	Greece	0	0	2	2
15	Hungary	0	0	1	1
15	Israel	0	0	1	1
15	Netherlands	0	0	1	1
15	Scotland	0	0	1	1
Totals (18 entries)		17	17	34	68

== Medallists ==
=== Men's competition ===
==== Individual ====
Event	Gold	Silver	Bronze
Kata	(Italy) Luca Valdesi	(Croatia) Kristian Novak	(France) Vu Duc Minh Dack (Italy) Lucio Maurino
Kumite –60 kg	(Spain) David Luque	(Turkey) Ömer Kemaloğlu	(Croatia) Danil Domdjoni (France) William Rollé
Kumite –65 kg	(Spain) César Castaño	(Italy) Ciro Massa	(Germany) Christian Grüner (Hungary) Adam Kovács
Kumite –70 kg	(Bosnia and Herzegovina) Mensur Cakić	(Belgium) Diego Davy Vandeschrick	(Italy) Giuseppe Di Domenico (England) Jason Ledgister
Kumite –75 kg	(France) Olivier Beaudry	(Italy) Salvatore Loria	(Bosnia and Herzegovina) Mate Odak (Spain) Davíd Santana
Kumite –80 kg	(Turkey) Zeki Demir	(England) Davin Pack	(Italy) Luigi Busà (Greece) Konstantinos Papadopoulos
Kumite +80 kg	(England) Leon Walters	(Bosnia and Herzegovina) Arnel Kalušić	(Italy) Stefano Maniscalco (Scotland) Calum Robb
Kumite Open	(Italy) Stefano Maniscalco	(Belgium) Diego Davy Vandeschrick	(France) Ludovic Cacheux (Greece) Spyrídon Margaritópoulos

==== Team ====
Event	Gold	Silver	Bronze
Kata	France; Julien Dupont; Ayoub Neghliz; Jonathan Plagnol	Italy; Vincenzo Figuccio; Lucio Maurino; Luca Valdesi	Croatia Spain; Manuel Cedres; Damián Quintero; Fernando San José
Kumite	Turkey; Okay Arpa; Yusuf Başer; Zeki Demir; Yücel Gündoğdu; Yavuz Karamollaoğlu; Yaser Şahintekin; Serkan Yağcı	Bosnia and Herzegovina	Netherlands Italy; Luigi Busà; Giuseppe Di Domenico; Salvatore Loria; Stefano Maniscalco; Ciro Massa; Francesco Ortu

=== Women's competition ===
==== Individual ====
Event	Gold	Silver	Bronze
Kata	(Spain) Miriam Cogolludo	(Czech Republic) Petra Nová	(Spain) Almudena Muñoz (Croatia) Mirna Šenjug
Kumite –53 kg	(Slovakia) Monika Višňovská	(Croatia) Jelena Kovačević	(Israel) Loris Afarah (Germany) Ulrike Fleischmann
Kumite –60 kg	(Spain) Carmen Vicente	(Russia) Maria Sobol	(Slovakia) Eva Medveďová (Germany) Silvia Sperner
Kumite +60 kg	(France) Laurence Fischer	(Turkey) Yıldız Aras	(Germany) Jeannine Herrgesell (Russia) Aza Koshty
Kumite Open	(Serbia and Montenegro) Snežana Perić	(Turkey) Yıldız Aras	(Spain) Cristina Feo (Germany) Nadine Ziemer

==== Team ====
Event	Gold	Silver	Bronze
Kata	France; Jessica Buil; Sabrina Buil; Laëtitia Guesnel	Italy; Sara Battaglia; Viviana Bottaro; Samantha Piccolo	Croatia Spain; Miriam Cogolludo; Ruth Jiménez; Almudena Muñoz
Kumite	Germany; Ulrike Fleischmann; Kora Knühmann; Silvia Sperner; Nadine Ziemer	Bosnia and Herzegovina	Serbia and Montenegro Spain; Gloria Casanova; Irene Colomar; Cristina Feo; Carmen Vicente
