= 2012 European Karate Championships =

Karate competition

- Location: Adeje, Spain
- Dates: 10–13 May
- Competitors: 450 from 45 nations

The 2012 European Karate Championships, the 47th edition, were held in Adeje, Tenerife, Spain from 10 to 13 May 2012. A total of 450 competitors from 45 countries participated at the event.

== Medal table ==
* Host nation (Spain)

Rank	Nation	Gold	Silver	Bronze	Total
1	Italy	4	1	2	7
2	France	3	2	6	11
3	Turkey	3	2	4	9
4	Spain*	2	3	0	5
5	Germany	2	1	4	7
6	Croatia	1	1	2	4
7	Greece	1	0	1	2
8	Azerbaijan	0	1	3	4
9	Slovakia	0	1	1	2
10	Czech Republic	0	1	0	1
10	Latvia	0	1	0	1
10	Netherlands	0	1	0	1
10	Ukraine	0	1	0	1
14	Serbia	0	0	3	3
15	Bosnia and Herzegovina	0	0	1	1
15	England	0	0	1	1
15	Montenegro	0	0	1	1
15	Russia	0	0	1	1
15	Sweden	0	0	1	1
15	Switzerland	0	0	1	1
Totals (20 entries)		16	16	32	64

== Medalists ==
=== Men's competition ===
==== Individual ====
Event	Gold	Silver	Bronze
Kata	(Italy) Luca Valdesi	(Spain) Fernando San José	(England) Jonathan Mottram (France) Vu Duc Minh Dack
Kumite –60 kg	(Spain) Matías Gómez	(Latvia) Kalvis Kalniņš	(Croatia) Danil Domdjoni (Germany) Alexander Heimann
Kumite –67 kg	(France) William Rolle	(Turkey) Ömer Kemaloğlu	(Azerbaijan) Niyazi Aliyev (Italy) Ciro Massa
Kumite –75 kg	(Italy) Luigi Busà	(Netherlands) René Smaal	(Germany) Noah Bitsch (Azerbaijan) Rafael Aghayev
Kumite –84 kg	(Greece) Georgios Tzanos	(Azerbaijan) Aykhan Mamayev	(France) Kenji Grillon (Serbia) Slobodan Bitević
Kumite +84 kg	(Germany) Jonathan Horne	(Italy) Stefano Maniscalco	(Serbia) Dejan Umićević (Turkey) Enes Erkan

==== Team ====
Event	Gold	Silver	Bronze
Kata	Italy; Vincenzo Figuccio; Lucio Maurino; Luca Valdesi	Spain; Damián Quintero; Francisco Salazar; Fernando San José	France; Romain Lacoste; Jonathan Maruani; Jonathan Plagnol Turkey; Arslan Çalışkan; Orçun Duman; Ali Sofuoğlu
Kumite	Germany; Andreas Bachmann; Noah Bitsch; Mehmet Bolat; Oliver Henning; Jonathan Horne; Heinrich Leistenschneider; Nikoloz Tsurtsumia	Turkey; Enes Erkan; Yücel Gündoğdu; Murat Salih Kurnaz; Mustafa Utku Şahin; Yaser Şahintekin; Aykut Usda; Serkan Yağcı	Azerbaijan; Rafael Aghayev; Tural Alakbarli; Niyazi Aliyev; Sanan Aliyev; Shahin Atamov; Asiman Gurbanli; Aykhan Mamayev Bosnia and Herzegovina; Adnan Adilović; Alem Kupusović; Oliver Mandarić; Mate Odak; Nermin Potur; Nermin Sinanović; Admir Zukan

=== Women's competition ===
==== Individual ====
Event	Gold	Silver	Bronze
Kata	(Spain) Yaiza Martín	(France) Sandy Scordo	(Serbia) Marija Madžarević (Greece) Sofia Marika Livitsanou
Kumite –50 kg	(Turkey) Serap Özçelik	(Slovakia) Lucia Kováčiková	(France) Alexandra Recchia (Sweden) Gulsah Akdag
Kumite –55 kg	(Croatia) Jelena Kovačević	(Germany) Jana Bitsch	(France) Lucie Ignace (Slovakia) Jana Vojtikevičová
Kumite –61 kg	(France) Lolita Dona	(Ukraine) Anita Serogina	(Croatia) Ivana Bebek (Turkey) Ece Yaşar
Kumite –68 kg	(Turkey) Hafsa Şeyda Burucu	(France) Tiffany Fanjat	(Montenegro) Marina Raković (Russia) Inga Sherozia
Kumite +68 kg	(Italy) Greta Vitelli	(Czech Republic) Radka Krejčová	(France) Nadège Ait-Ibrahim (Turkey) Meltem Hocaoğlu

==== Team ====
Event	Gold	Silver	Bronze
Kata	France; Clothilde Boulanger; Sonia Fiuza; Jessica Hugues	Spain; Sonia García; Yaiza Martín; Margarita Morata	Italy; Sara Battaglia; Viviana Bottaro; Michela Pezzetti Germany; Franziska Krieg; Denise Pawlovski; Sabine Schneider
Kumite	Turkey; Gülderen Çelik Albayrak; Meltem Hocaoğlu; Serap Özçelik; Tuba Yenen	Croatia; Ana-Marija Čelan; Maša Martinović; Azra Saleš; Ivona Tubić	Germany; Duygu Bugur; Jana Bitsch; Maria Weiß; Monique Puscher Switzerland; Jessica Cargill; Noémie Kornfeld; Aurélie Magnin
