= 2009 European Karate Championships =

Karate competition

- Venue: Dom Sportova
- Location: Zagreb, Croatia
- Dates: 8–10 May
- Competitors: 479

The 2009 European Karate Championships, the 44th edition, were held at the Dom Sportova in Zagreb, Croatia from 8 to 10 May 2009. A total of 479 competitors participated at the event.

== Medal table ==
* Host nation (Croatia)

Rank	Nation	Gold	Silver	Bronze	Total
1	Spain	4	3	2	9
2	Croatia*	3	0	3	6
3	Italy	2	2	4	8
4	Turkey	2	1	4	7
5	Azerbaijan	2	0	2	4
6	Russia	1	2	1	4
7	Netherlands	1	0	0	1
7	Slovakia	1	0	0	1
9	Germany	0	2	2	4
9	Greece	0	2	2	4
11	France	0	1	6	7
12	Czech Republic	0	1	1	2
12	England	0	1	1	2
14	North Macedonia	0	1	0	1
15	Austria	0	0	1	1
15	Bosnia and Herzegovina	0	0	1	1
15	Hungary	0	0	1	1
15	Romania	0	0	1	1
Totals (18 entries)		16	16	32	64

== Medallists ==
=== Men's competition ===
==== Individual ====
Event	Gold	Silver	Bronze
Kata	(Italy) Luca Valdesi	(Spain) Fernando San José	(France) Vu Duc Minh Dack (Italy) Lucio Maurino
Kumite –60 kg	(Croatia) Danil Domdjoni	(Spain) Matías Gómez	(Italy) Michele Giuliani (Turkey) İlyas Demir
Kumite –67 kg	(Azerbaijan) Niyazi Aliyev	(Greece) Dimitrios Triantafyllis	(Austria) Thomas Kaserer (France) William Rolle
Kumite –75 kg	(Azerbaijan) Rafael Aghayev	(Italy) Luigi Busà	(Greece) Georgios Tzanos (Turkey) Serkan Yağcı
Kumite –84 kg	(Netherlands) Timothy Petersen	(Turkey) Enes Erkan	(Azerbaijan) Amal Atayev (Italy) Salvatore Loria
Kumite +84 kg	(Russia) Alexander Gerunov	(Italy) Stefano Maniscalco	(Germany) Enrico Höhne (Turkey) Okay Arpa

==== Team ====
Event	Gold	Silver	Bronze
Kata	Italy; Vincenzo Figuccio; Lucio Maurino; Luca Valdesi	Spain	Czech Republic France
Kumite	Turkey; Yusuf Başer; Müslüm Baştürk; Zeki Demir; Gökhan Gündüz; Yavuz Karamollaoğlu; Murat Salih Kurnaz; Yaser Şahintekin	Greece	Azerbaijan France

=== Women's competition ===
==== Individual ====
Event	Gold	Silver	Bronze
Kata	(Spain) Yaiza Martín	(Czech Republic) Petra Nová	(Croatia) Mirna Šenjug (France) Sandy Scordo
Kumite –50 kg	(Spain) Natalia García	(Germany) Desiree Christiansen	(Russia) Elena Ponomareva (Turkey) Gülderen Çelik
Kumite –55 kg	(Croatia) Jelena Kovačević	(North Macedonia) Natasa Ilievska	(Spain) Gema Alías (Romania) Stefania Sandu
Kumite –61 kg	(Slovakia) Eva Tulejová-Medveďová	(England) Natalie Williams	(Bosnia and Herzegovina) Mirsada Suljkanović (France) Lolita Dona
Kumite –68 kg	(Croatia) Petra Volf	(France) Tiffany Fanjat	(Spain) Irene Colomar (Greece) Vassiliki Panetsidou
Kumite +68 kg	(Turkey) Yıldız Aras	(Russia) Evgeniya Podborodnikova	(Croatia) Ana-Marija Čelan (England) Katie Hurry

==== Team ====
Event	Gold	Silver	Bronze
Kata	Spain	Germany	Croatia Italy; Sara Battaglia; Viviana Bottaro; Samantha Piccolo
Kumite	Spain	Russia	Germany Hungary

== Participating countries ==
- Albania
- Andorra
- Armenia
- Austria
- Azerbaijan
- Belgium
- Belarus
- Bosnia and Herzegovina
- Croatia
- Cyprus
- Czech Republic
- Denmark
- England
- Estonia
- Finland
- France
- Georgia
- Germany
- Greece
- Hungary
- Iceland
- Ireland
- Israel
- Italy
- Latvia
- Liechtenstein
- Lithuania
- Luxembourg
- Macedonia
- Moldova
- Monaco
- Montenegro
- Netherlands
- Northern Ireland
- Norway
- Poland
- Portugal
- Romania
- Russia
- San Marino
- Scotland
- Serbia
- Slovakia
- Slovenia
- Spain
- Sweden
- Switzerland
- Turkey
- Ukraine
- Wales
