= 2008 World Karate Championships =

Karate competition

- Host city: Tokyo, Japan
- Dates: 13–16 November
- Main venue: Nippon Budokan

The 2008 World Karate Championships are the 19th edition of the World Karate Championships, and were held in Tokyo, Japan from November 13 to November 16, 2008.

== Medalists ==
=== Men ===
Event	Gold	Silver	Bronze
Individual kata	Luca Valdesi; Italy	Antonio Díaz; Venezuela	Vu Duc Minh Dack; France
Individual kata	Luca Valdesi; Italy	Antonio Díaz; Venezuela	Mustafa Ibrahim; Egypt
Team kata	France; Julien Dupont; Ayoub Neghliz; Jonathan Plagnol	Japan	Peru; Jimmy Moreno; Akio Tamashiro; Hafid Zevallos
Team kata	France; Julien Dupont; Ayoub Neghliz; Jonathan Plagnol	Japan	Italy; Vincenzo Figuccio; Lucio Maurino; Luca Valdesi
Kumite −60 kg	Danil Domdjoni; Croatia	Darkhan Assadilov; Kazakhstan	Hossein Rouhani; Iran
Kumite −60 kg	Danil Domdjoni; Croatia	Darkhan Assadilov; Kazakhstan	Douglas Brose; Brazil
Kumite −65 kg	George Kotaka; United States	Ádám Kovács; Hungary	William Rollé; France
Kumite −65 kg	George Kotaka; United States	Ádám Kovács; Hungary	Takuro Nihei; Japan
Kumite −70 kg	Rafael Aghayev; Azerbaijan	Tamer Abdelraouf; Egypt	Saeed Baghbani; Canada
Kumite −70 kg	Rafael Aghayev; Azerbaijan	Tamer Abdelraouf; Egypt	Shinji Nagaki; Japan
Kumite −75 kg	David Dubó; Chile	Müslüm Baştürk; Turkey	Mohamed Abdelrahman; Egypt
Kumite −75 kg	David Dubó; Chile	Müslüm Baştürk; Turkey	Ko Matsuhisa; Japan
Kumite −80 kg	Satoshi Ibuchi; Japan	Islamutdin Eldaruchev; Russia	Hany Shakr; Egypt
Kumite −80 kg	Satoshi Ibuchi; Japan	Islamutdin Eldaruchev; Russia	Alibek Prenov; Kazakhstan
Kumite +80 kg	Stefano Maniscalco; Italy	Ibrahim Gary; France	Calum Robb; Scotland
Kumite +80 kg	Stefano Maniscalco; Italy	Ibrahim Gary; France	Jonathan Horne; Germany
Kumite open	Rafael Aghayev; Azerbaijan	Spyridon Margaritopoulos; Greece	Stefano Maniscalco; Italy
Kumite open	Rafael Aghayev; Azerbaijan	Spyridon Margaritopoulos; Greece	Gogita Arkania; Georgia
Team kumite	Turkey; Okay Arpa; Yusuf Başer; Müslüm Baştürk; Zeki Demir; Yücel Dündoğdu; Murat Salih Kurnaz; Yaser Şahintekin	Serbia; Slobodan Bitević; Stefan Ivanović; Dimitrije Jerković; Miloš Jovanović; Vladan Rudić Vranić; Dejan Umičević; Miloš Živković	Egypt
Team kumite	Turkey; Okay Arpa; Yusuf Başer; Müslüm Baştürk; Zeki Demir; Yücel Dündoğdu; Murat Salih Kurnaz; Yaser Şahintekin	Serbia; Slobodan Bitević; Stefan Ivanović; Dimitrije Jerković; Miloš Jovanović; Vladan Rudić Vranić; Dejan Umičević; Miloš Živković	Spain; Iván Leal; Adrián Martínez; Francisco Martínez; Óscar Martínez; Cristian Rodríguez; Antonio Sánchez; Óscar Vázquez

=== Women ===
Event	Gold	Silver	Bronze
Individual kata	Nguyễn Hoàng Ngân; Vietnam	Sara Battaglia; Italy	Kasuga Wakabayashi; Japan
Individual kata	Nguyễn Hoàng Ngân; Vietnam	Sara Battaglia; Italy	Marija Madžarević; Serbia
Team kata	Japan	France; Clotilde Boulanger; Céline Chevalier; Sonia Fiuza	Italy; Sara Battaglia; Viviana Bottaro; Samantha Piccolo
Team kata	Japan	France; Clotilde Boulanger; Céline Chevalier; Sonia Fiuza	Spain; Fátima de Acuña; Ruth Jiménez; Almudena Muñoz
Kumite −53 kg	Natsuki Fujiwara; Japan	Kora Knühmann; Germany	Gülderen Çelik; Turkey
Kumite −53 kg	Natsuki Fujiwara; Japan	Kora Knühmann; Germany	Elena Ponomareva; Russia
Kumite −60 kg	Maria Sobol; Russia	Nassim Varasteh; Canada	Katarina Strika; Serbia
Kumite −60 kg	Maria Sobol; Russia	Nassim Varasteh; Canada	Vildan Doğan; Turkey
Kumite +60 kg	Tiffany Fanjat; France	Elisa Au-Fonseca; United States	Evgenia Podborodnikova; Russia
Kumite +60 kg	Tiffany Fanjat; France	Elisa Au-Fonseca; United States	Cristina Feo; Spain
Kumite open	Yuka Sato; Japan	Gloria Casanova; Spain	Ema Aničić; Croatia
Kumite open	Yuka Sato; Japan	Gloria Casanova; Spain	Eva Tulejová-Medveďová; Slovakia
Team kumite	Germany; Yasmina Benadda; Kora Knühmann; Silvia Sperner; Maria Weiß	Spain; Gloria Casanova; Irene Colomar; Cristina Feo; Carmen Vicente	Italy; Selene Guglielmi; Roberta Minet; Laura Pasqua; Greta Vitelli
Team kumite	Germany; Yasmina Benadda; Kora Knühmann; Silvia Sperner; Maria Weiß	Spain; Gloria Casanova; Irene Colomar; Cristina Feo; Carmen Vicente	France; Nadège Ait-Ibrahim; Tiffany Fanjat; Alexandra Recchia; Ruth Soufflet

== Medal table ==
* Host nation (Japan)

Rank	Nation	Gold	Silver	Bronze	Total
1	Japan*	4	1	4	9
2	France	2	2	3	7
3	Italy	2	1	4	7
4	Azerbaijan	2	0	0	2
5	Russia	1	1	2	4
5	Turkey	1	1	2	4
7	Germany	1	1	1	3
8	United States	1	1	0	2
9	Croatia	1	0	1	2
10	Chile	1	0	0	1
10	Vietnam	1	0	0	1
12	Spain	0	2	3	5
13	Egypt	0	1	4	5
14	Serbia	0	1	2	3
15	Canada	0	1	1	2
15	Kazakhstan	0	1	1	2
17	Greece	0	1	0	1
17	Hungary	0	1	0	1
17	Venezuela	0	1	0	1
20	Brazil	0	0	1	1
20	Georgia	0	0	1	1
20	Iran	0	0	1	1
20	Peru	0	0	1	1
20	Scotland	0	0	1	1
20	Slovakia	0	0	1	1
Totals (25 entries)		17	17	34	68

== Participating nations ==
888 athletes from 97 nations competed.

- Afghanistan (4)
- Algeria (7)
- Argentina (5)
- Armenia (4)
- Australia (11)
- Austria (10)
- Azerbaijan (8)
- Belarus (3)
- Belgium (10)
- Belize (2)
- Benin (5)
- Bosnia and Herzegovina (14)
- Brazil (19)
- Bulgaria (10)
- Canada (16)
- Chile (3)
- China (13)
- Chinese Taipei (11)
- Colombia (11)
- Congo (7)
- Costa Rica (12)
- Croatia (26)
- Czech Republic (10)
- Denmark (16)
- Dominican Republic (4)
- Ecuador (3)
- Egypt (16)
- El Salvador (3)
- England (15)
- Estonia (6)
- Fiji (2)
- Finland (5)
- France (23)
- Georgia (1)
- Germany (22)
- Greece (14)
- Hong Kong (20)
- Hungary (5)
- Iceland (2)
- India (8)
- Indonesia (7)
- Iran (16)
- Ireland (2)
- Israel (4)
- Italy (16)
- Japan (19)
- Jordan (4)
- Kazakhstan (14)
- Kuwait (11)
- Latvia (1)
- Macau (13)
- Macedonia (11)
- Madagascar (1)
- Malaysia (13)
- Mauritius (5)
- Mexico (15)
- Moldova (2)
- Montenegro (4)
- Morocco (5)
- Netherlands (8)
- Netherlands Antilles (1)
- New Zealand (9)
- Nicaragua (1)
- Nigeria (1)
- Northern Ireland (1)
- Norway (5)
- Pakistan (4)
- Peru (3)
- Poland (10)
- Portugal (8)
- Qatar (6)
- Romania (11)
- Russia (21)
- Saudi Arabia (9)
- Scotland (8)
- Senegal (11)
- Serbia (18)
- Singapore (3)
- Slovakia (16)
- Slovenia (9)
- South Africa (18)
- South Korea (15)
- Spain (20)
- Sweden (9)
- Switzerland (10)
- Syria (5)
- Tajikistan (1)
- Thailand (3)
- Tunisia (10)
- Turkey (24)
- Ukraine (6)
- United States (19)
- Uruguay (1)
- Uzbekistan (9)
- Venezuela (13)
- Vietnam (11)
- Wales (2)
