= 2012 World Karate Championships =

Karate competition

- Host city: Paris, France
- Dates: 21–25 November
- Main venue: Palais Omnisports de Paris-Bercy

The 2012 World Karate Championships are the 21st edition of the World Karate Championships, and were held in Paris, France from November 21 to November 25, 2012.

== Medalists ==
=== Men ===
Event	Gold	Silver	Bronze
Individual kata	Antonio Díaz; Venezuela	Vu Duc Minh Dack; France	Luca Valdesi; Italy
Individual kata	Antonio Díaz; Venezuela	Vu Duc Minh Dack; France	Ryo Kiyuna; Japan
Team kata	Japan; Koji Arimoto; Takato Soma; Takumi Sugino	Italy; Luca Valdesi; Vincenzo Figuccio; Lucio Maurino	France; Jonathan Plagnol; Romain Lacoste; Jonathan Maruani
Team kata	Japan; Koji Arimoto; Takato Soma; Takumi Sugino	Italy; Luca Valdesi; Vincenzo Figuccio; Lucio Maurino	Egypt; Ibrahim Magdy; Mustafa Ibrahim; Ahmed Ashraf
Kumite −60 kg	Amir Mehdizadeh; Iran	Douglas Brose; Brazil	Mohamed Gamal; Egypt
Kumite −60 kg	Amir Mehdizadeh; Iran	Douglas Brose; Brazil	Marko Antić; Serbia
Kumite −67 kg	Magdy Mamdouh; Egypt	Saeid Ahmadi; Iran	Brian Ramrup; United States
Kumite −67 kg	Magdy Mamdouh; Egypt	Saeid Ahmadi; Iran	William Rollé; France
Kumite −75 kg	Luigi Busà; Italy	Rafael Aghayev; Azerbaijan	Oualid Bouabaoub; Algeria
Kumite −75 kg	Luigi Busà; Italy	Rafael Aghayev; Azerbaijan	Ko Matsuhisa; Japan
Kumite −84 kg	Kenji Grillon; France	Ryutaro Araga; Japan	Yavuz Karamollaoğlu; Turkey
Kumite −84 kg	Kenji Grillon; France	Ryutaro Araga; Japan	Aykhan Mamayev; Azerbaijan
Kumite +84 kg	Enes Erkan; Turkey	Shahin Atamov; Azerbaijan	Khalid Khalidov; Kazakhstan
Kumite +84 kg	Enes Erkan; Turkey	Shahin Atamov; Azerbaijan	Stefano Maniscalco; Italy
Team kumite	France; Mathieu Cossou; Nadir Benaissa; Kenji Grillon; Ibrahim Gary; Azdin Rghioui; Salim Bendiab; Logan Da Costa	Turkey; Enes Erkan; Yücel Gündoğdu; Murat Salih Kurnaz; Yaser Şahintekin; Gökhan Gündüz; Mustafa Utku Şahin; Aykut Usda	Iran; Maziar Elhami; Saeid Farrokhi; Zabihollah Pourshab; Ebrahim Hassanbeigi; Saman Heidari; Ali Fadakar; Sajjad Ganjzadeh
Team kumite	France; Mathieu Cossou; Nadir Benaissa; Kenji Grillon; Ibrahim Gary; Azdin Rghioui; Salim Bendiab; Logan Da Costa	Turkey; Enes Erkan; Yücel Gündoğdu; Murat Salih Kurnaz; Yaser Şahintekin; Gökhan Gündüz; Mustafa Utku Şahin; Aykut Usda	Egypt; Hany Shakr; Ahmed Sayed; Ossama Abdelaziz; Sayed Salem; Mohamed Gamal; Magdy Mamdouh; Omar Ahmed

=== Women ===
Event	Gold	Silver	Bronze
Individual kata	Rika Usami; Japan	Sandy Scordo; France	Sakura Kokumai; United States
Individual kata	Rika Usami; Japan	Sandy Scordo; France	Yaiza Martín; Spain
Team kata	Japan; Yoko Kimura; Suzuka Kashioka; Miku Morioka	Italy; Sara Battaglia; Viviana Bottaro; Michela Pezzetti	Spain; Yaiza Martín; Margarita Morata; Sonia García
Team kata	Japan; Yoko Kimura; Suzuka Kashioka; Miku Morioka	Italy; Sara Battaglia; Viviana Bottaro; Michela Pezzetti	France; Sonia Fiuza; Clothilde Boulanger; Jessica Hugues
Kumite −50 kg	Alexandra Recchia; France	Li Hong; China	Serap Özçelik; Turkey
Kumite −50 kg	Alexandra Recchia; France	Li Hong; China	Ana Villanueva; Dominican Republic
Kumite −55 kg	Lucie Ignace; France	Jelena Kovačević; Croatia	Yassmin Hamdy; Egypt
Kumite −55 kg	Lucie Ignace; France	Jelena Kovačević; Croatia	Miki Kobayashi; Japan
Kumite −61 kg	Lolita Dona; France	Boutheina Hasnaoui; Tunisia	Elena Quirici; Switzerland
Kumite −61 kg	Lolita Dona; France	Boutheina Hasnaoui; Tunisia	Yu Miyamoto; Japan
Kumite −68 kg	Kayo Someya; Japan	Hafsa Şeyda Burucu; Turkey	Heba Abdelrahman; Egypt
Kumite −68 kg	Kayo Someya; Japan	Hafsa Şeyda Burucu; Turkey	Tiffany Fanjat; France
Kumite +68 kg	Nadège Aït-Ibrahim; France	Greta Vitelli; Italy	Ayumi Uekusa; Japan
Kumite +68 kg	Nadège Aït-Ibrahim; France	Greta Vitelli; Italy	Eleni Chatziliadou; Greece
Team kumite	France; Tiffany Fanjat; Lolita Dona; Alexandra Recchia; Emily Thouy	Croatia; Maša Martinović; Azra Saleš; Ana-Marija Čelan; Ivona Tubić	Turkey; Serap Özçelik; Tuba Yenen; Meltem Hocaoğlu; Hafsa Şeyda Burucu
Team kumite	France; Tiffany Fanjat; Lolita Dona; Alexandra Recchia; Emily Thouy	Croatia; Maša Martinović; Azra Saleš; Ana-Marija Čelan; Ivona Tubić	Japan; Miki Kobayashi; Yu Miyamoto; Kayo Someya; Ayumi Uekusa

== Medal table ==
Rank	Nation	Gold	Silver	Bronze	Total
1	France	7	2	4	13
2	Japan	4	1	6	11
3	Italy	1	3	2	6
4	Turkey	1	2	3	6
5	Iran	1	1	1	3
6	Egypt	1	0	5	6
7	Venezuela	1	0	0	1
8	Azerbaijan	0	2	1	3
9	Croatia	0	2	0	2
10	Brazil	0	1	0	1
10	China	0	1	0	1
10	Tunisia	0	1	0	1
13	Spain	0	0	2	2
13	United States	0	0	2	2
15	Algeria	0	0	1	1
15	Dominican Republic	0	0	1	1
15	Greece	0	0	1	1
15	Kazakhstan	0	0	1	1
15	Serbia	0	0	1	1
15	Switzerland	0	0	1	1
Totals (20 entries)		16	16	32	64

== Participating nations ==
990 athletes from 116 nations competed.

- Afghanistan (1)
- Albania (4)
- Algeria (16)
- Andorra (1)
- Argentina (4)
- Armenia (5)
- Australia (8)
- Austria (11)
- Azerbaijan (9)
- Bangladesh (3)
- Belarus (11)
- Belgium (9)
- Belize (1)
- Benin (7)
- Bosnia and Herzegovina (12)
- Botswana (2)
- Brazil (12)
- Bulgaria (11)
- Cameroon (6)
- Canada (12)
- Chile (10)
- China (12)
- Chinese Taipei (8)
- Colombia (14)
- Congo (5)
- Costa Rica (2)
- Croatia (23)
- Cuba (2)
- Curaçao (1)
- Cyprus (2)
- Czech Republic (12)
- Denmark (6)
- Dominican Republic (7)
- Ecuador (6)
- Egypt (19)
- England (19)
- Estonia (1)
- Finland (8)
- France (24)
- Gabon (8)
- Georgia (7)
- Germany (22)
- Greece (13)
- Guinea (1)
- Hong Kong (9)
- Hungary (13)
- Iceland (3)
- India (9)
- Indonesia (10)
- Iran (14)
- Ireland (6)
- Israel (6)
- Italy (18)
- Japan (21)
- Kazakhstan (12)
- Kenya (13)
- Kuwait (8)
- Latvia (6)
- Lebanon (1)
- Libya (4)
- Luxembourg (5)
- Macau (6)
- Macedonia (12)
- Madagascar (8)
- Malaysia (13)
- Mali (2)
- Mexico (15)
- Moldova (3)
- Monaco (1)
- Montenegro (17)
- Morocco (18)
- Mozambique (2)
- Nepal (3)
- Netherlands (11)
- New Zealand (10)
- Nicaragua (2)
- Norway (5)
- Pakistan (1)
- Palestine (1)
- Peru (11)
- Philippines (1)
- Poland (7)
- Portugal (17)
- Puerto Rico (2)
- Qatar (5)
- Romania (11)
- Russia (20)
- Rwanda (5)
- San Marino (1)
- São Tomé and Príncipe (1)
- Saudi Arabia (9)
- Scotland (5)
- Senegal (9)
- Serbia (19)
- Singapore (1)
- Slovakia (9)
- Slovenia (10)
- South Africa (10)
- South Korea (13)
- Spain (19)
- Sri Lanka (1)
- Sweden (8)
- Switzerland (13)
- Syria (1)
- Tunisia (12)
- Turkey (21)
- Ukraine (15)
- United Arab Emirates (5)
- United States (14)
- Uzbekistan (11)
- Venezuela (18)
- Vietnam (10)
- Wales (2)
- Yemen (1)
- Zambia (5)
- Zimbabwe (3)
