= Gülderen Çelik =

Turkish karateka (born 1980)

- Born: April 13, 1980 (age 46); Istanbul, Turkey
- Nationality: Turkish
- Height: 1.60 m (5.2 ft)
- Division: -53 kg
- Style: Karate Kumite
- Team: Kocaeli Büyükşehir Belediyesi Kağıt Spor Kulübü

Other information
- Occupation: Teacher
- University: Trakya University

Gülderen Çelik
Medal record

Women's karate

Representing Turkey

World Championships
Bronze medal – third place	2008 Tokyo	-53kg
Gold medal – first place	2004 Monterrey	team

World Games
Bronze medal – third place	2009 Kaohsiung	-53kg

European Championships
Gold medal – first place	2012 Tenerife	team
Bronze medal – third place	2010 Athens	-50kg
Bronze medal – third place	2009 Zagreb	-50kg
Bronze medal – third place	2008 Tallinn	-53kg
Gold medal – first place	2007 Bratislava	-53kg
Gold medal – first place	2005 Tenerife	-53kg
Gold medal – first place	2004 Moscow	team
Gold medal – first place	2003 Bremen	-53kg
Bronze medal – third place	1999 Euboea	-53kg

Mediterranean Games
Gold medal – first place	2009 Pescara	-50kg

World University Championships
Gold medal – first place	2004 Belgrade	-53kg

International Tournaments
Bronze medal – third place	Dutch Open 2009 Rotterdam	-55kg
Bronze medal – third place	German Open 2008 Hamburg	-53kg
Silver medal – second place	Italian Open 2007 Monza	-53kg
Gold medal – first place	Italian Open 2005 Monza	-53kg

Gülderen Çelik (born April 13, 1980, in Istanbul, Turkey) is a Turkish karateka competing in the kumite –53 kg division. The 1.80 m (5.9 ft) tall athlete is member of the Sarıyer Belediyespor in Istanbul. Her trainer is Turan Yılmaz.

== Personal life ==
She was born the youngest of five children in the Mecidiyeköy neighborhood of Istanbul. Following her graduation from the high school in 2001, she enrolled in Trakya University to study physical education. Immediately after finishing the university, she was appointed as a teacher in a school in Istanbul, where she serves today.

== Sports career ==
Aged only 12 years, Çelik was inspired by a neighbor's young boy performing karate. In 1992 she started in attending karate lessons given by Bahattin Kandez, a former national karate practitioner. He is still her tutor.

After having been successful at the provincial level, Çelik fought in national tournaments winning titles. At her first international participation in 1999 in Euboea, Greece, she became European bronze medalist in kumite under 53 kg division.

Since then, she has been competing at various international events with success and has been champion several times in her category.

== Achievements ==
=== Individual ===
2012

- 16th Balkan Children & Seniors karate championships in Herceg Novi, Montenegro – kumite -55 kg

2010

- 45th European Karate Senior Championships in Athens, Greece – May 7–9 – kumite -50 kg
- 20th World Senior Karate Championships – Belgrade, Serbia – October 27 – kumite -50 kg 5th

2009

- 16. Mediterranean Games in Pescara, Italy – June 25-July 5 – kumite -50 kg
- World Games in Kaohsiung, Taiwan – July 25–26 – kumite -53 kg
- 44th European Karate Senior Championships in Zagreb, Croatia – May 8–10 – kumite -50 kg
- Dutch Open in Rotterdam, Netherlands – March 7–8 – kumite -55 kg

2008

- 19th World Championships in Tokyo, Japan – November 13–16 – kumite -53 kg
- German Open in Hamburg, Germany – September 27–28 – kumite -53 kg
- 43rd European Championships in Tallinn, Estonia – May 2–4 – kumite -53 kg

2007

- 42nd European Championships in Bratislava, Slovakia – May 4–6 – kumite -53 kg
- Italian Open in Monza, Italy – March 31-April 1 – kumite -53 kg

2006

- National Championships in Antalya, Turkey – March 26–27 – kumite -53 kg

2005

- 40th European Championships in Tenerife, Spain – May 13–15 – kumite -53 kg
- Italian Open in Monza, Italy – April 9–10 – kumite -53 kg

2004

- 4th World University Karate Championships in Belgrade, Serbia – July 10 – kumite -53 kg

2003

- European Championships in Bremen, Germany – May 9–11 – kumite -53 kg

1999

- European Championships in Euboea, Greece – May 20–23 – kumite -53 kg
- National Individual Karate Tournament in Denizli, Turkey

=== Team ===
2012

- 47th European Karate Senior Championships in Tenerife, Spain – May 10–13 – kumite team female

2005

- National Clubs and European Regional Teams Championships in Yalova, Turkey – May 20 – kumite

2004

- 17th World Karate Championships in Monterrey, Mexico – November 18–21 – kumite team female
- National Karate Clubs League Championships in Bursa, Turkey – October 10 – kumite team female
- 39th European Championships in Moscow, Russia May 7–9 – kumite team female
