= 2008 European Karate Championships =

Karate competition

- Venue: Saku Suurhall
- Location: Tallinn, Estonia
- Dates: 2–4 May
- Competitors: 509 from 42 nations

The 2008 European Karate Championships, the 43rd edition, were held at the Saku Suurhall in Tallinn, Estonia from 2 May to 4 2008. A total of 509 karateka, 329 male and 180 female athletes, from 42 countries participated at the event.

== Medal table ==
* Host nation (Estonia)

Rank	Nation	Gold	Silver	Bronze	Total
1	Spain	5	1	5	11
2	Italy	2	3	3	8
3	Croatia	2	1	1	4
4	Germany	2	0	3	5
5	France	1	2	2	5
6	Turkey	1	1	8	10
7	Slovakia	1	1	2	4
8	Azerbaijan	1	1	1	3
9	Switzerland	1	0	1	2
10	Belgium	1	0	0	1
11	Bosnia and Herzegovina	0	2	1	3
12	Russia	0	2	0	2
13	Serbia	0	1	2	3
14	Greece	0	1	0	1
14	Poland	0	1	0	1
16	Austria	0	0	1	1
16	Czech Republic	0	0	1	1
16	Great Britain	0	0	1	1
16	Netherlands	0	0	1	1
16	North Macedonia	0	0	1	1
Totals (20 entries)		17	17	34	68

== Medallists ==
=== Men's competition ===
==== Individual ====
Event	Gold	Silver	Bronze
Kata	(Italy) Luca Valdesi	(Italy) Lucio Maurino	(France) Vu Duc Minh Dack (United Kingdom) Jonathan Mottram
Kumite –60 kg	(Croatia) Danil Domdjoni	(Spain) Davíd Luque	(Italy) Michele Giuliani (Germany) Alexander Heimann
Kumite –65 kg	(Turkey) Ömer Kemaloğlu	(France) William Rollé	(Austria) Thomas Kaserer (Slovakia) Peter Macko
Kumite –70 kg	(Spain) Óscar Vázquez	(Azerbaijan) Rafael Aghayev	(Italy) Nello Maestri (Turkey) Serkan Yağcı
Kumite –75 kg	(Belgium) Diego Davy Vandeschrick	(Greece) Georgios Tzanos	(Italy) Luigi Busà (Slovakia) Klaudio Farmadín
Kumite –80 kg	(France) Ludovic Cacheux	(Serbia) Slobodan Bitević	(Turkey) Enes Erkan (Spain) Iván Leal
Kumite +80 kg	(Germany) Jonathan Horne	(Italy) Stefano Maniscalco	(Turkey) Okay Arpa (Spain) Francisco Martínez
Kumite Open	(Azerbaijan) Rafael Aghayev	(Turkey) Yavuz Karamollaoğlu	(Croatia) Neven Martić (Netherlands) Daniël Sabanovic

==== Team ====
Event	Gold	Silver	Bronze
Kata	Italy; Vincenzo Figuccio; Lucio Maurino; Luca Valdesi	France	Germany Spain
Kumite	Spain	Russia	Germany Azerbaijan

=== Women's competition ===
==== Individual ====
Event	Gold	Silver	Bronze
Kata	(Croatia) Mirna Šenjug	(Slovakia) Kristína Grmanová	(Turkey) Kübra Akarsu (Spain) Almudena Muñoz
Kumite –53 kg	(Germany) Kora Knühmann	(Poland) Anna Fajkowska	(Turkey) Gülderen Çelik (Turkey) Serap Özçelik
Kumite –60 kg	(Spain) Carmen Vicente	(Russia) Maria Sobol	(North Macedonia) Iseni Ardita (Czech Republic) Petra Peceková
Kumite +60 kg	(Switzerland) Fanny Clavien	(Bosnia and Herzegovina) Arnela Odžaković	(Turkey) Yıldız Aras (Spain) Cristina Feo
Kumite Open	(Slovakia) Eva Medveďová Tulejová	(Bosnia and Herzegovina) Merima Softić	(Turkey) Yıldız Aras (Serbia) Biljana Stojović

==== Team ====
Event	Gold	Silver	Bronze
Kata	Spain	Croatia	France Serbia
Kumite	Spain	Italy	Bosnia and Herzegovina Switzerland; Jessica Cargill; Fanny Clavien; Yvonne Honauer; Diana Schwab

== Participating countries ==
- Armenia
- Austria
- Azerbaijan
- Belgium
- Bosnia and Herzegovina
- Belarus
- Bulgaria
- Croatia
- Cyprus
- Czech Republic
- Denmark
- England
- Spain
- Estonia
- Finland
- France
- Georgia
- Germany
- Greece
- Hungary
- Iceland
- Israel
- Italy
- Latvia
- Luxembourg
- Macedonia
- Montenegro
- Netherlands
- Norway
- Poland
- Portugal
- Romania
- Russia
- Scotland
- Slovenia
- Serbia
- Switzerland
- Slovakia
- Sweden
- Turkey
- Ukraine
- Wales
