= 2004 European Karate Championships =

Karate competition

- Venue: Luzhniki Small Sports Arena
- Location: Moscow, Russia
- Dates: 7–9 May
- Competitors: 440 from 38 nations

The 2004 European Karate Championships, the 39th edition, were held in Moscow, Russia from 7 to 9 May 2004.

== Madalya tablosu ==
* Host nation (Russia)

Rank	Nation	Gold	Silver	Bronze	Total
1	France	5	1	3	9
2	Italy	3	4	2	9
3	Spain	2	6	3	11
4	Turkey	2	2	2	6
5	Germany	2	0	4	6
6	Russia*	1	3	2	6
7	Azerbaijan	1	0	0	1
7	Netherlands	1	0	0	1
9	Serbia and Montenegro	0	1	3	4
10	Croatia	0	0	4	4
11	Greece	0	0	3	3
12	Bosnia and Herzegovina	0	0	2	2
13	Belgium	0	0	1	1
13	Bulgaria	0	0	1	1
13	Czech Republic	0	0	1	1
13	England	0	0	1	1
13	Hungary	0	0	1	1
13	Slovakia	0	0	1	1
Totals (18 entries)		17	17	34	68

== Medallists ==
=== Men's competition ===
==== Individual ====
Event	Gold	Silver	Bronze
Kata	(Italy) Luca Valdesi	(Spain) Damián Quintero	(France) Vu Duc Minh Dack (Croatia) Kristian Novak
Kumite –60 kg	(Spain) Davíd Luque	(Russia) Artur Aslanyan	(Bulgaria) Borislav Ivanov (England) Paul Newby
Kumite –65 kg	(Azerbaijan) Rafael Aghayev	(France) Alexandre Biamonti	(Croatia) Dario Svetić (Italy) Ciro Massa
Kumite –70 kg	(Spain) Óscar Vázquez	(Italy) Giuseppe Di Domenico	(Greece) Konstantinos Pappas (Belgium) Diego Vandeschrick
Kumite –75 kg	(France) Olivier Beaudry	(Italy) Salvatore Loria	(Spain) Iván Leal (Turkey) Yavuz Karamollaoğlu
Kumite –80 kg	(Netherlands) Daniël Sabanovic	(Russia) Islamutdin Eldaruchev	(Germany) Lukas Grezella (Bosnia and Herzegovina) Admir Ćupina
Kumite +80 kg	(France) Franc Chantalou	(Italy) David Benetello	(Greece) Spyridon Margaritopoulos (Russia) Alexander Gerunov
Kumite Open	(Italy) Md Golam Zakaria	(Turkey) Okay Arpa	(France) Guillaume Cossou (Slovakia) Klaudio Farmadín

==== Team ====
Event	Gold	Silver	Bronze
Kata	Italy; Vincenzo Figuccio; Lucio Maurino; Luca Valdesi	Spain; Francisco Hernández; Víctor López; Fernando San José	Germany; Timo Gißler; Michael Haas; Nico Sandhaas Croatia
Kumite	Russia	Spain; Ricardo Barbero; Iván Leal; Francisco Martínez; Óscar Martínez; Cristian Rodríguez; David Santana; Óscar Vázquez	Bosnia and Herzegovina Turkey; Haldun Alagaş; Okay Arpa; Yusuf Başer; Müslüm Baştürk; Zeynel Çelik; Zeki Demir; Yavuz Karamollaoğlu

=== Women's competition ===
==== Individual ====
Event	Gold	Silver	Bronze
Kata	(France) Myriam Szkudlarek	(Spain) Miriam Cogolludo	(Serbia and Montenegro) Marina Kiš (Czech Republic) Petra Nová
Kumite –53 kg	(Germany) Kora Knühmann	(Russia) Elena Ponomareva	(Hungary) Beatrix Tóth (Greece) Evdoxia Kosmidou
Kumite –60 kg	(Germany) Alexandra Kurtz	(Serbia and Montenegro) Snežana Perić	(Russia) Maria Sobol (Spain) Noelia Fernández
Kumite +60 kg	(France) Laurence Fischer	(Turkey) Meral Ölmez	(Spain) Cristina Feo (Serbia and Montenegro) Branka Kavurin
Kumite Open	(Turkey) Yildiz Aras	(Spain) Gloria Casanova	(Germany) Nadine Ziemer (Serbia and Montenegro) Snežana Perić

==== Team ====
Event	Gold	Silver	Bronze
Kata	France; Jessica Buil; Sabrina Buil; Laëtitia Guesnel	Spain; Miriam Cogolludo; Ruth Jiménez; Almudena Muñoz	Croatia Italy; Daniela Berettoni; Giada Salvatori; Anna Maria Zaccaro
Kumite	Turkey; Yıldız Aras; Gülderen Çelik; Meral Ölmez; Gülcihan Ustaoğlu	Italy; Raffaella Carlini; Selene Guglielmi; Roberta Minet; Greta Vitelli	Germany; Yasmina Benadda; Kora Knühmann; Alexandra Kurtz; Nadine Ziemer France
