= 2007 European Karate Championships =

Karate competition

- Location: Bratislava, Slovakia
- Dates: 4–6 May
- Competitors: 492 from 42 nations

The 2007 European Karate Championships, the 42nd edition, were held in Bratislava, Slovakia from 4 to 6 May 2007.

== Medal table ==
* Host nation (Slovakia)

Rank	Nation	Gold	Silver	Bronze	Total
1	Italy	5	1	4	10
2	Turkey	3	3	2	8
3	Spain	3	2	5	10
4	Azerbaijan	2	0	0	2
5	Slovakia*	1	3	1	5
6	Croatia	1	1	1	3
7	Russia	1	0	3	4
8	Czech Republic	1	0	0	1
9	France	0	2	4	6
10	Bosnia and Herzegovina	0	2	1	3
11	Greece	0	1	2	3
12	North Macedonia	0	1	1	2
12	Slovenia	0	1	1	2
14	Belgium	0	0	2	2
14	Switzerland	0	0	2	2
16	Bulgaria	0	0	1	1
16	Germany	0	0	1	1
16	Montenegro	0	0	1	1
16	Poland	0	0	1	1
16	Serbia	0	0	1	1
Totals (20 entries)		17	17	34	68

== Medallists ==
=== Men's competition ===
==== Individual ====
Event	Gold	Silver	Bronze
Kata	(Italy) Luca Valdesi	(Spain) Fernando San José	(France) Vu Duc Minh Dack (Italy) Lucio Maurino
Kumite −60 kg	(Italy) Francesco Ortu	(Turkey) Ömer Kemaloğlu	(Croatia) Danil Domdjoni (Spain) Davíd Luque
Kumite −65 kg	(Turkey) Yücel Gündoğdu	(North Macedonia) Ivo Cvetkovski	(Bulgaria) Borislav Ivanov (Greece) Dimítrios Triantafýllis
Kumite −70 kg	(Azerbaijan) Rafael Aghayev	(Turkey) Serkan Yağcı	(Russia) Omar Omarov (Belgium) Diego Vandeschrick
Kumite −75 kg	(Italy) Luigi Busà	(Slovenia) Matija Matijevič	(Russia) Mourad Gadzhiev (France) Cédric Sioussaran
Kumite −80 kg	(Spain) Iván Leal	(Slovakia) Andrej Harničár	(Italy) Alessandro Nardi (Slovenia) Dejan Vozlič
Kumite +80 kg	(Italy) Stefano Maniscalco	(Croatia) Alen Zamlić	(Russia) Aleksandr Guerunov (Spain) Francisco Martínez
Kumite Open	(Azerbaijan) Rafael Aghayev	(Slovakia) Klaudio Farmadín	(North Macedonia) Sasko Arsovski (Turkey) Yusuf Başer

==== Team ====
Event	Gold	Silver	Bronze
Kata	Italy	France	Spain; Manuel Cedres; Damián Quintero; Fernando San José Serbia
Kumite	Russia	Greece	Italy Bosnia and Herzegovina

=== Women's competition ===
==== Individual ====
Event	Gold	Silver	Bronze
Kata	(Croatia) Mirna Šenjug	(France) Sabrina Buil	(Spain) Almudena Muñoz (Switzerland) Michelle Saner
Kumite −53 kg	(Turkey) Gülderen Çelik	(Slovakia) Monika Višňovská	(Italy) Selene Guglielmi (Belgium) Muriel Vanderhaeghen
Kumite −60 kg	(Czech Republic) Petra Peceková	(Turkey) Vildan Doğan	(Poland) Anna Fajkowska (Spain) Carmen Vicente
Kumite +60 kg	(Turkey) Yıldız Aras	(Bosnia and Herzegovina) Arnela Odžaković	(Switzerland) Fanny Clavien (Greece) Alexia Karypidou
Kumite Open	(Slovakia) Eva Medveďová	(Spain) Cristina Feo	(Turkey) Yıldız Aras (France) Tiffany Fanjat

==== Team ====
Event	Gold	Silver	Bronze
Kata	Spain; Fátima de Acuña; Ruth Jiménez; Almudena Muñoz	Italy	France; Jessica Buil; Sabrina Buil; Laëtitia Guesnel Montenegro
Kumite	Spain; Gloria Casanova; Irene Colomar; Cristina Feo; Carmen Vicente	Bosnia and Herzegovina	Germany; Yasmina Benadda; Jeannine Herrgesell; Kora Knühmann; Silvia Sperner Slovakia
