= 2005 European Karate Championships =

Karate competition

- Location: San Cristóbal de La Laguna, Spain
- Dates: 13–15 May
- Competitors: 386 from 40 nations

The 2005 European Karate Championships, the 40th edition, were held in San Cristóbal de La Laguna, Spain from 13 to 15 May 2005.

== Medal table ==
* Host nation (Spain)

Rank	Nation	Gold	Silver	Bronze	Total
1	Spain*	5	2	5	12
2	Netherlands	3	1	0	4
3	Azerbaijan	2	0	2	4
4	France	1	3	6	10
5	Italy	1	2	4	7
6	Germany	1	2	0	3
7	Turkey	1	1	4	6
8	Croatia	1	0	2	3
8	Greece	1	0	2	3
10	Switzerland	1	0	0	1
11	Czech Republic	0	2	1	3
12	Bosnia and Herzegovina	0	1	1	2
12	England	0	1	1	2
12	Serbia	0	1	1	2
15	Russia	0	1	0	1
16	Belgium	0	0	1	1
16	Georgia	0	0	1	1
16	Hungary	0	0	1	1
16	North Macedonia	0	0	1	1
16	Norway	0	0	1	1
Totals (20 entries)		17	17	34	68

== Medallists ==
=== Men's competition ===
==== Individual ====
Event	Gold	Silver	Bronze
Kata	(Italy) Luca Valdesi	(Spain) Fernando San José	(France) Vu Duc Minh Dack (Italy) Lucio Maurino
Kumite –60 kg	(Spain) Francesco Ortu	(Netherlands) Geoffrey Berens	(Azerbaijan) Yusif Alish Jafarov (Greece) Ioannis Syllas
Kumite –65 kg	(Greece) Dimítrios Triantafýllis	(France) Mathieu Cossou	(Azerbaijan) Rashad Huseynov (Italy) Ciro Massa
Kumite –70 kg	(Azerbaijan) Jeyhun Aghasiyev	(France) Rida Bel Lahsen	(Croatia) Goran Lučin (Spain) Óscar Vázquez
Kumite –75 kg	(Netherlands) Timothy Petersen	(Turkey) Yavuz Karamollaoğlu	(Spain) Davíd Santana (Greece) Konstantinos Papadopoulos
Kumite –80 kg	(Netherlands) Daniël Sabanovic	(England) Davin Pack	(Georgia (country)) Gogita Arkania (France) Ludovic Cacheux
Kumite +80 kg	(Switzerland) Fehmi Mahalla	(Czech Republic) Jan Tuček	(Norway) Geir Magne Brastad (France) Youcef Hamour
Kumite Open	(Azerbaijan) Rafael Aghayev	(Spain) Iván Leal	(Turkey) Yusuf Baser (Belgium) Diego Vandeschrick

==== Team ====
Event	Gold	Silver	Bronze
Kata	Spain; Manuel Cedres; Damián Quintero; Fernando San José	Italy; Vincenzo Figuccio; Lucio Maurino; Luca Valdesi	Serbia and Montenegro France
Kumite	Spain; Marcos Arenas; Tomás Herrero; Iván Leal; Francisco Martínez; Antonio Sánchez; David Santana; Óscar Vázquez	Bosnia and Herzegovina	Croatia France

=== Women's competition ===
==== Individual ====
Event	Gold	Silver	Bronze
Kata	(Spain) Miriam Cogolludo	(Czech Republic) Petra Nová	(Italy) Daniela Berrettoni (France) Sabrina Buil
Kumite –53 kg	(Germany) Kora Knühmann	(Germany) Ulrike Fleischmann	(Turkey) Gülderen Çelik (Hungary) Beatrix Tóth
Kumite –60 kg	(Croatia) Petra Naranđa	(Russia) Maria Sobol	(Turkey) Vildan Doğan (Italy) Selene Guglielmi
Kumite +60 kg	(Turkey) Yıldız Aras	(France) Emmeline Mottet	(Spain) Cristina Feo (England) Tania Weekes
Kumite Open	(Netherlands) Vanesca Nortan	(Serbia and Montenegro) Snežana Perić	(Turkey) Yıldız Aras (Spain) Gloria Casanova

==== Team ====
Event	Gold	Silver	Bronze
Kata	France; Jessica Buil; Sabrina Buil; Laëtitia Guesnel	Italy; Daniela Berrettoni; Viviana Bottaro; Samantha Piccolo	Spain; Miriam Cogolludo; Ruth Jiménez; Almudena Muñoz Macedonia
Kumite	Spain; Gloria Casanova; Cristina Feo; Noelia Fernández; Lucía Zamora	Germany; Yasmina Benadda; Ulrike Fleischmann; Kora Knühmann; Nadine Ziemer	Czech Republic Bosnia and Herzegovina
