= Viviana Bottaro =

Italian karateka (born 1987)

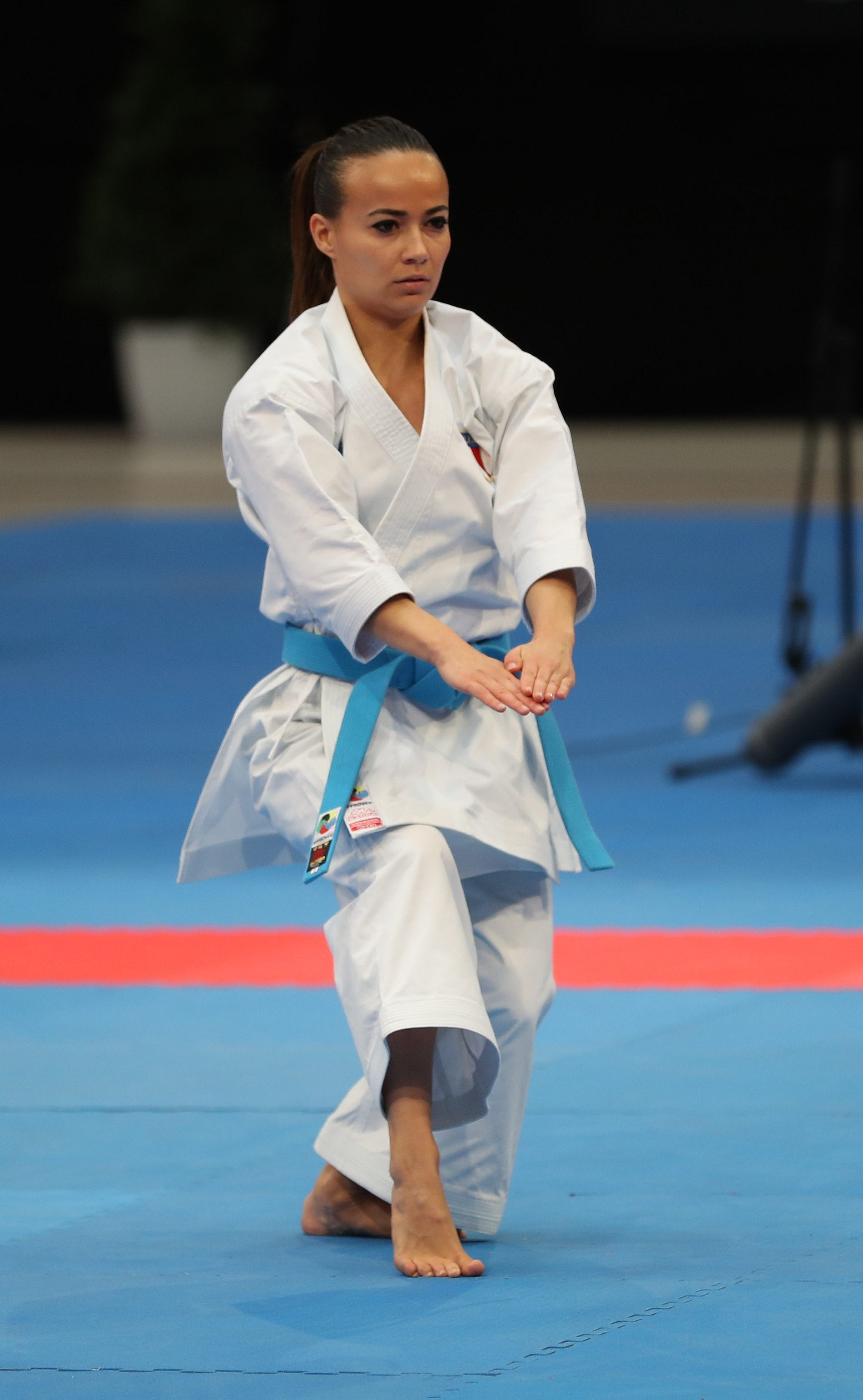
- Bottaro in 2018

Personal information
- Born: 2 September 1987 (age 38) Genoa, Italy

Sport
- Country: Italy
- Sport: Karate
- Events: Individual kata; Team kata
- Club: Fiamme Oro
Medal record
Women's karate
Representing Italy
Olympic Games
Bronze medal – third place	2020 Tokyo	Individual kata
World Championships
Silver medal – second place	2012 Paris	Team kata
Bronze medal – third place	2008 Tokyo	Team kata
Bronze medal – third place	2010 Belgrade	Team kata
Bronze medal – third place	2014 Bremen	Team kata
Bronze medal – third place	2016 Linz	Individual kata
Bronze medal – third place	2016 Linz	Team kata
Bronze medal – third place	2018 Madrid	Individual kata
Bronze medal – third place	2021 Dubai	Individual kata
European Games
Silver medal – second place	2019 Minsk	Individual kata
European Championships
Gold medal – first place	2013 Budapest	Team kata
Gold medal – first place	2014 Tampere	Individual kata
Gold medal – first place	2017 İzmit	Team kata
Silver medal – second place	2005 San Cristóbal de La Laguna	Team kata
Silver medal – second place	2006 Stavanger	Team kata
Silver medal – second place	2007 Bratislava	Team kata
Silver medal – second place	2010 Athens	Team kata
Silver medal – second place	2011 Zürich	Team kata
Silver medal – second place	2013 Budapest	Individual kata
Silver medal – second place	2014 Tampere	Team kata
Silver medal – second place	2017 İzmit	Individual kata
Silver medal – second place	2018 Novi Sad	Individual kata
Silver medal – second place	2019 Guadalajara	Individual kata
Bronze medal – third place	2009 Zagreb	Team kata
Bronze medal – third place	2012 Adeje	Team kata
Bronze medal – third place	2015 Istanbul	Team kata
Bronze medal – third place	2016 Montpellier	Individual kata
Bronze medal – third place	2016 Montpellier	Team kata
Bronze medal – third place	2021 Poreč	Individual kata

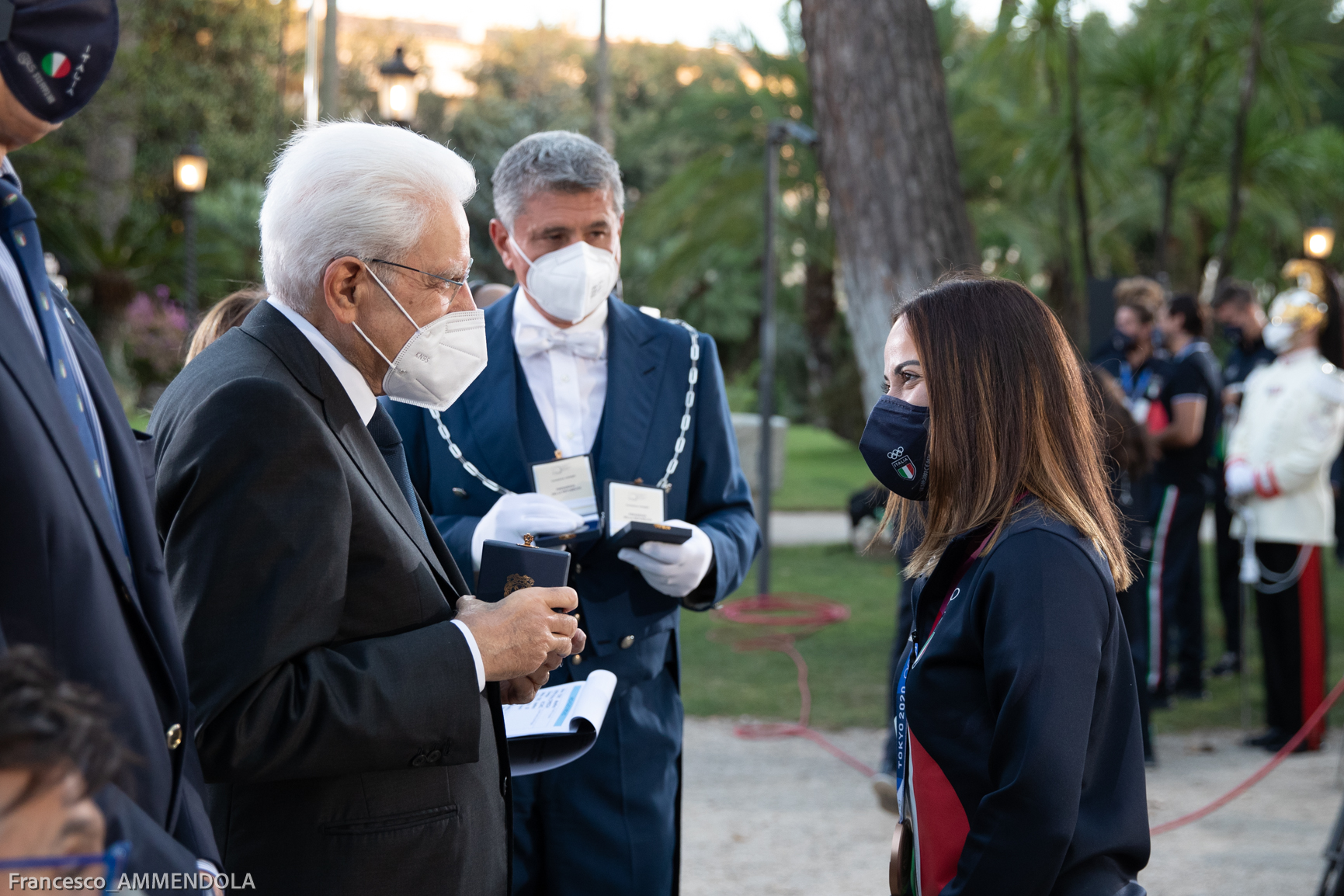
Bottaro awarded by Sergio Mattarella at Quirinale in 2021.

Viviana Bottaro (born 2 September 1987) is an Italian karateka. She won one of the bronze medals in the women's kata event at the 2020 Summer Olympics in Tokyo, Japan. Bottaro has also won numerous medals in the women's individual kata and women's team kata events at the World Karate Championships and the European Karate Championships. She is a three-time bronze medalist in the women's individual kata event at the World Karate Championships. She is also the 2014 European champion in this event.

== Biography ==
In 2019, Bottaro won the silver medal in the women's individual kata event at the European Karate Championships held in Guadalajara, Spain. The following month, she represented Italy at the European Games held in Minsk, Belarus and she won the silver medal in the women's individual kata event.

In 2020, Bottaro qualified to represent Italy at the 2020 Summer Olympics in Tokyo, Japan.

In May 2021, Bottaro won one of the bronze medals in the women's individual kata event at the European Karate Championships held in Poreč, Croatia. A few months later, she won one of the bronze medals in the women's kata event at the 2020 Summer Olympics. In October 2021, she won the gold medal in her event at the 2021 Mediterranean Karate Championships held in Limassol, Cyprus. In November 2021, she won one of the bronze medals in the women's individual kata event at the World Karate Championships held in Dubai, United Arab Emirates.

== Achievements ==
Year	Competition	Venue	Rank	Event
2005	European Championships	San Cristóbal de La Laguna, Spain	2nd	Team kata
2006	European Championships	Stavanger, Norway	2nd	Team kata
2007	European Championships	Bratislava, Slovakia	2nd	Team kata
2008	World Championships	Tokyo, Japan	3rd	Team kata
2009	European Championships	Zagreb, Croatia	3rd	Team kata
2010	European Championships	Athens, Greece	2nd	Team kata
2010	World Championships	Belgrade, Serbia	3rd	Team kata
2011	European Championships	Zürich, Switzerland	2nd	Team kata
2012	European Championships	Adeje, Spain	3rd	Team kata
2012	World Championships	Paris, France	2nd	Team kata
2013	European Championships	Budapest, Hungary	2nd	Individual kata
2013	European Championships	Budapest, Hungary	1st	Team kata
2014	European Championships	Tampere, Finland	1st	Individual kata
2014	European Championships	Tampere, Finland	2nd	Team kata
2014	World Championships	Bremen, Germany	3rd	Team kata
2015	European Championships	Istanbul, Turkey	3rd	Team kata
2016	European Championships	Montpellier, France	3rd	Individual kata
2016	European Championships	Montpellier, France	3rd	Team kata
2016	World Championships	Linz, Austria	3rd	Individual kata
2016	World Championships	Linz, Austria	3rd	Team kata
2017	European Championships	İzmit, Turkey	2nd	Individual kata
2017	European Championships	İzmit, Turkey	1st	Team kata
2018	European Championships	Novi Sad, Serbia	2nd	Individual kata
2018	World Championships	Madrid, Spain	3rd	Individual kata
2019	European Championships	Guadalajara, Spain	2nd	Individual kata
2019	European Games	Minsk, Belarus	2nd	Individual kata
2021	European Championships	Poreč, Croatia	3rd	Individual kata
2021	Summer Olympics	Tokyo, Japan	3rd	Individual kata
2021	World Championships	Dubai, United Arab Emirates	3rd	Individual kata
