= Karate at the 2005 World Games – Men's kumite 75 kg =

Men's kumite 75 kg at the 2005 World Games
- Venue: Kfraftzentrale
- Date: 23 July 2005
- Competitors: 7 from 6 nations

Medalists
1st place, gold medalist(s)		(Germany) Köksal Çakır
2nd place, silver medalist(s)		(Greece) Konstantinos Papadopoulos
3rd place, bronze medalist(s)		(Slovakia) Klaudio Farmadín

The men's kumite 75 kg competition in karate at the 2005 World Games took place on 23 July 2005 at the Kfraftzentrale in Duisburg, Germany.

== Competition format ==
A total of 7 athletes entered the competition. In elimination round they fought in two groups. From this stage the best two athletes qualifies to the semifinals.

== Results ==
=== Elimination round ===
==== Group A ====
Rank	Athlete	B	W	D	L	Pts	Score
1	Konstantinos Papadopoulos (GRE)	2	2	0	0	4	12–2
2	Köksal Çakır (GER)	2	1	0	1	2	8–8
3	Fotios Barounis (AUS)	2	0	0	2	0	2–12

	Score	
Konstantinos Papadopoulos (GRE)	8–0	Köksal Çakır (GER)
Fotios Barounis (AUS)	2–4	Konstantinos Papadopoulos (GRE)
Köksal Çakır (GER)	8–0	Fotios Barounis (AUS)

==== Group B ====
Rank	Athlete	B	W	D	L	Pts	Score
1	Klaudio Farmadín (SVK)	3	1	1	1	3	8–7
2	Frank Reuter (GER)	3	1	1	1	3	7–11
3	Jose Perez (VEN)	3	1	1	1	3	7–7
4	Yavuz Karamollaoğlu (TUR)	3	1	1	1	3	7–5

	Score	
Jose Perez (VEN)	2–2	Yavuz Karamollaoğlu (TUR)
Frank Reuter (GER)	4–4	Klaudio Farmadín (SVK)
Yavuz Karamollaoğlu (TUR)	4–0	Frank Reuter (GER)
Jose Perez (VEN)	2–1	Klaudio Farmadín (SVK)
Jose Perez (VEN)	3–4	Frank Reuter (GER)
Yavuz Karamollaoğlu (TUR)	1–3	Klaudio Farmadín (SVK)

=== Finals ===
Semifinals
Konstantinos Papadopoulos (GRE)	5
Frank Reuter (GER)	1
Klaudio Farmadín (SVK)	5
Köksal Çakır (GER)	9

Final
Konstantinos Papadopoulos (GRE)	1
Köksal Çakır (GER)	5
Third place
Frank Reuter (GER)	2
Klaudio Farmadín (SVK)	3
