= 2010 World Karate Championships =

Karate competition

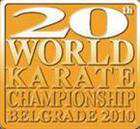
- Host city: Belgrade, Serbia
- Dates: 27–31 October
- Main venue: Kombank Arena

The 2010 World Karate Championships are the 20th edition of the World Karate Championships, and were held in Belgrade, Serbia from October 27 to October 31, 2010.

== Medalists ==
=== Men ===
Event	Gold	Silver	Bronze
Individual kata	Antonio Díaz; Venezuela	Luca Valdesi; Italy	Itaru Oki; Japan
Individual kata	Antonio Díaz; Venezuela	Luca Valdesi; Italy	Akio Tamashiro; Peru
Team kata	Italy; Luca Valdesi; Vincenzo Figuccio; Lucio Maurino	Japan; Itaru Oki; Takumi Hasegawa; Masashi Ogihara	Peru; Akio Tamashiro; Jimmy Moreno; Hafid Zevallos
Team kata	Italy; Luca Valdesi; Vincenzo Figuccio; Lucio Maurino	Japan; Itaru Oki; Takumi Hasegawa; Masashi Ogihara	Spain; Fernando San José; Damián Quintero; Francisco Salazar
Kumite −60 kg	Douglas Brose; Brazil	Michele Giuliani; Italy	Matías Gómez; Spain
Kumite −60 kg	Douglas Brose; Brazil	Michele Giuliani; Italy	Kalvis Kalniņš; Latvia
Kumite −67 kg	Dimitrios Triantafyllis; Greece	Hamed Ziksari; Iran	Ádám Kovács; Hungary
Kumite −67 kg	Dimitrios Triantafyllis; Greece	Hamed Ziksari; Iran	Shinji Nagaki; Japan
Kumite −75 kg	Rafael Aghayev; Azerbaijan	Luigi Busà; Italy	Nermin Potur; Bosnia and Herzegovina
Kumite −75 kg	Rafael Aghayev; Azerbaijan	Luigi Busà; Italy	Miloš Jovanović; Serbia
Kumite −84 kg	Slobodan Bitević; Serbia	Yavuz Karamollaoğlu; Turkey	Ludovic Cacheux; France
Kumite −84 kg	Slobodan Bitević; Serbia	Yavuz Karamollaoğlu; Turkey	Islamutdin Eldaruchev; Russia
Kumite +84 kg	Dejan Umičević; Serbia	Mohanad Magdy; Egypt	Shahin Atamov; Azerbaijan
Kumite +84 kg	Dejan Umičević; Serbia	Mohanad Magdy; Egypt	Žarko Arsovski; Macedonia
Team kumite	Serbia; Miloš Jovanović; Miloš Živković; Dejan Umičević; Dimitrije Jerković; Slobodan Bitević; Miloš Vuković; Nikola Jovanović	Azerbaijan; Rashad Huseynov; Rafael Aghayev; Amal Atayev; Shahin Atamov; Israfil Shirinov; Sanan Aliyev; Niyazi Aliyev	Bosnia and Herzegovina; Admir Zukan; Tarik Lušija; Oliver Mandarić; Alem Kupusović; Mate Odak; Nermin Potur; Adnan Adilović
Team kumite	Serbia; Miloš Jovanović; Miloš Živković; Dejan Umičević; Dimitrije Jerković; Slobodan Bitević; Miloš Vuković; Nikola Jovanović	Azerbaijan; Rashad Huseynov; Rafael Aghayev; Amal Atayev; Shahin Atamov; Israfil Shirinov; Sanan Aliyev; Niyazi Aliyev	Egypt; Mohamed Abdelrahman; Sayed Salem; Mohanad Magdy; Hany Shakr; Ossama Abdelaziz; Tamer Abdelraouf; Mohamed Gamal

=== Women ===
Event	Gold	Silver	Bronze
Individual kata	Yohana Sánchez; Venezuela	Nguyễn Hoàng Ngân; Vietnam	Mirna Šenjug; Croatia
Individual kata	Yohana Sánchez; Venezuela	Nguyễn Hoàng Ngân; Vietnam	Rika Usami; Japan
Team kata	Japan; Kazuyo Inoue; Yoko Kimura; Fumi Sakai	Vietnam; Nguyễn Hoàng Ngân; Nguyễn Thanh Hằng; Đỗ Thị Thu Hà	Italy; Sara Battaglia; Viviana Bottaro; Michela Pezzetti
Team kata	Japan; Kazuyo Inoue; Yoko Kimura; Fumi Sakai	Vietnam; Nguyễn Hoàng Ngân; Nguyễn Thanh Hằng; Đỗ Thị Thu Hà	Spain; Fátima de Acuña; Ruth Jiménez; Yaiza Martín
Kumite −50 kg	Li Hong; China	Betty Aquilina; France	Cheili González; Guatemala
Kumite −50 kg	Li Hong; China	Betty Aquilina; France	Tyler Wolfe; United States
Kumite −55 kg	Miki Kobayashi; Japan	Sara Cardin; Italy	Jelena Kovačević; Croatia
Kumite −55 kg	Miki Kobayashi; Japan	Sara Cardin; Italy	Shannon Nishi; United States
Kumite −61 kg	Kristina Mah; Australia	Lolita Dona; France	Natalie Williams; England
Kumite −61 kg	Kristina Mah; Australia	Lolita Dona; France	Diana Schwab; Switzerland
Kumite −68 kg	Yadira Lira; Mexico	Asumi Ishizuka; Japan	Irene Colomar; Spain
Kumite −68 kg	Yadira Lira; Mexico	Asumi Ishizuka; Japan	Hafsa Şeyda Burucu; Turkey
Kumite +68 kg	Greta Vitelli; Italy	Nadège Aït-Ibrahim; France	Merima Softić; Bosnia and Herzegovina
Kumite +68 kg	Greta Vitelli; Italy	Nadège Aït-Ibrahim; France	Tang Lingling; China
Team kumite	France; Tiffany Fanjat; Lolita Dona; Alexandra Recchia; Ruth Soufflet	Spain; Cristina Feo; Cristina Vizcaíno; Irene Colomar; Carmen Vicente	Croatia; Maša Martinović; Azra Saleš; Ana-Marija Čelan; Ivona Tubić
Team kumite	France; Tiffany Fanjat; Lolita Dona; Alexandra Recchia; Ruth Soufflet	Spain; Cristina Feo; Cristina Vizcaíno; Irene Colomar; Carmen Vicente	United States; Elisa Au-Fonseca; Shannon Nishi; Ashley Hill; Cheryl Murphy

== Medal table ==
Rank	Nation	Gold	Silver	Bronze	Total
1	Serbia	3	0	1	4
2	Italy	2	4	1	7
3	Japan	2	2	3	7
4	Venezuela	2	0	0	2
5	France	1	3	1	5
6	Azerbaijan	1	1	1	3
7	China	1	0	1	2
8	Australia	1	0	0	1
8	Brazil	1	0	0	1
8	Greece	1	0	0	1
8	Mexico	1	0	0	1
12	Vietnam	0	2	0	2
13	Spain	0	1	4	5
14	Egypt	0	1	1	2
14	Turkey	0	1	1	2
16	Iran	0	1	0	1
17	Bosnia and Herzegovina	0	0	3	3
17	Croatia	0	0	3	3
17	United States	0	0	3	3
20	Peru	0	0	2	2
21	England	0	0	1	1
21	Guatemala	0	0	1	1
21	Hungary	0	0	1	1
21	Latvia	0	0	1	1
21	Macedonia	0	0	1	1
21	Russia	0	0	1	1
21	Switzerland	0	0	1	1
Totals (27 entries)		16	16	32	64

== Participating nations ==
875 athletes from 88 nations competed.

- Albania (4)
- Algeria (17)
- Andorra (1)
- Argentina (10)
- Armenia (3)
- Australia (5)
- Austria (11)
- Azerbaijan (11)
- Belarus (12)
- Belgium (9)
- Benin (1)
- Bosnia and Herzegovina (14)
- Botswana (6)
- Brazil (13)
- Bulgaria (14)
- Canada (12)
- Chile (10)
- China (12)
- Chinese Taipei (8)
- Colombia (4)
- Croatia (25)
- Czech Republic (3)
- Denmark (9)
- Ecuador (6)
- Egypt (20)
- England (10)
- Estonia (5)
- Finland (6)
- France (25)
- Georgia (2)
- Germany (19)
- Greece (12)
- Guatemala (2)
- Hong Kong (18)
- Hungary (10)
- India (17)
- Indonesia (13)
- Iran (16)
- Israel (2)
- Italy (19)
- Japan (20)
- Jordan (6)
- Kazakhstan (13)
- Kuwait (13)
- Latvia (3)
- Libya (5)
- Luxembourg (3)
- Macau (8)
- Macedonia (22)
- Malaysia (8)
- Mexico (13)
- Moldova (1)
- Montenegro (21)
- Morocco (11)
- Mozambique (2)
- Netherlands (13)
- Netherlands Antilles (2)
- New Zealand (5)
- Nicaragua (1)
- Peru (6)
- Poland (4)
- Portugal (4)
- Puerto Rico (2)
- Qatar (3)
- Romania (6)
- Russia (22)
- São Tomé and Príncipe (1)
- Saudi Arabia (10)
- Scotland (9)
- Senegal (11)
- Serbia (23)
- Slovakia (14)
- Slovenia (13)
- South Africa (17)
- South Korea (10)
- Spain (20)
- Sweden (8)
- Switzerland (11)
- Syria (8)
- Tunisia (10)
- Turkey (20)
- Ukraine (5)
- United Arab Emirates (8)
- United States (14)
- Uzbekistan (8)
- Venezuela (12)
- Vietnam (4)
- Wales (6)
