= İstanbul Büyükşehir Belediyespor =

Multi-sports club based in İstanbul

İBB S.K.
- Formation: 15 June 1990; 36 years ago
- Location: Istanbul, Turkey
- President: Fatih Keleş

İstanbul Büyükşehir Belediyesi S.K., shortly İstanbul BB SK or İBBSK, is a multi-sports club of the Istanbul Metropolitan Municipality in Turkey.

== Branches ==
- Athletics
- Basketball
- Ice hockey
- Judo
- Karate
- Swimming
- Table tennis
- Taekwondo
- Volleyball
- Wrestling

== Notable members ==
International members of the club are:

=== Judo ===
Men's

Logo used until 2023

- Sezer Huysuz (−73 kg)
- Hüseyin Özkan (−66 kg) – 2000 Olympic gold medalist

Women's

- Tuana Gülenay (born 2007) (-78 kg)
- Büşra Katipoğlu (−63 kg)

=== Karate ===
Men's

- Uğur Aktaş (kumite −84 kg) – 2017 European champion
- Haldun Alagaş (kumite −70 kg)
- Yusuf Başer (kumite open)
- İlyas Demir (kumite −60 kg)
- Zeki Demir (kumite −80 kg) – 2006 European champion
- Enes Erkan (kumite −84 kg) – 2007 World junior, 2008 European junior, 2012, 2014 World, 2013, 2014 European, 2015 European Games champion
- Yücel Gündoğdu (kumite −65 kg) – 2007 European champion
- Ömer Kemaloğlu (kumite −65 kg) – 2008 European champion
- Ali Sofuoğlu (kata)
- Serkan Yağcı (kumite −75 kg)

Women's

- Vildan Doğan (Kumite open)

=== Taekwondo ===
Men's

- Bahri Tanrıkulu – 2004 Olympic silver medalist, multiple World and European champion, 2005 Universiade champion

Women's

- Zeynep Murat – 2000 World Cup, 2004 European and 2005 Universiade champion
- Kadriye Selimoğlu – 2001 World champion
- Azize Tanrıkulu (63 kg) – 2005 European and 2005 Universiade champion
- Hamide Bıkçın Tosun – 2000 Olympic bronze medalist and 1995 World champion
- Işıl Zafer (67 kg) – 2026 Mediterranean Games champion

=== Wrestling ===
Freestyle

- Adem Bereket (Freestyle) – 2000 Olympic bronze medalist
- Soner Demirtaş (Freestyle -74 kg) – 2016, 2017 European and 2013 Mediterranean Games champion
- Ramazan Şahin (Freestyle 66 kg) – 2008 Olympic gold medalist, 2007 World and 2008 European champion

Greco-Roman

- Aslan Atem (Greco-Roman -80 kg)
- Metehan Başar (Greco-Roman -85 kg)
- Şeref Eroğlu (Greco-Roman) – 2004 Olympic silver medalist, 1997 World and multiple European champion
- Mehmet Özal (Greco-Roman) – 2004 Olympic bronze medalist, 2002 World champion
- Hamza Yerlikaya (Greco-Roman) – 1996 and 2000 Olympic gold medalist, multiple World, European and 1997 Mediterranean Games champion
