= Rafael Aghayev =

Azerbaijan karateka (born 1985)

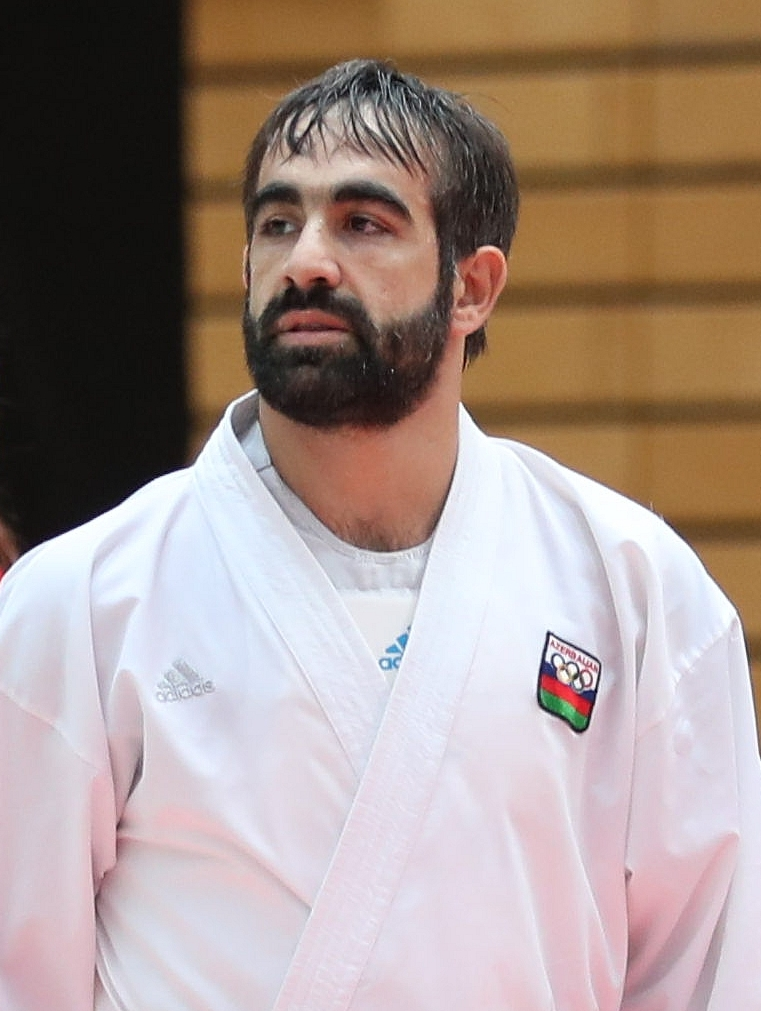
- Aghayev in 2018
- Born: 4 March 1985 (age 41); Sumgait, Azerbaijan SSR, USSR
- Native name: Rafael Ağayev
- Nickname: Panther of the East; Diamond of the Karate World
- Height: 167 cm (5 ft 6 in)
- Division: -75 kg
- Style: Shotokan
- Teacher: Rahman Hatamov
- Rank: Black Belt, 5th dan

Rafael Mahir Aghayev (Azerbaijani: Rafael Ağayev; born March 4, 1985) is an Azerbaijani karateka. He won the silver medal in the men's kumite 75 kg division at the 2020 Summer Olympics in Tokyo, Japan. He is a five-time world champion, and eleven-time European champion in his discipline. Aghayev was signed by Karate Combat and was the welterweight champion in the promotion with a record of 5–0.

== Early life ==
After graduating from Sumgait city school No. 21 in 2003, Aghayev entered the field of martial arts at the Azerbaijan Sport Academy graduating in 2007 as a specialty trainer-instructor in karate. From 2007 to 2008, he served in the Azerbaijani Armed Forces in the Aghjabadi District, before being transferred to the Central Sports Club of the Ministry of Defence due to his status as a promising sportsman.

Aghayev's father encouraged a love for sports in his three sons, and thus, Aghayev always intended to pursue a career in athletics. His oldest brother Ruslan trained in Judo, and his second oldest brother Rustam is a boxer.

At seven years old, Aghayev became involved in football, and at the same time, began training in karate under the instruction of his first coach, Rafael Mammadov. He went on to train for several years. Participating in the first national competition, he was noticed and invited to train in one of the famous sports clubs of the Republic, Budokan, under the leadership of Fizuli Musayev.

== Career ==
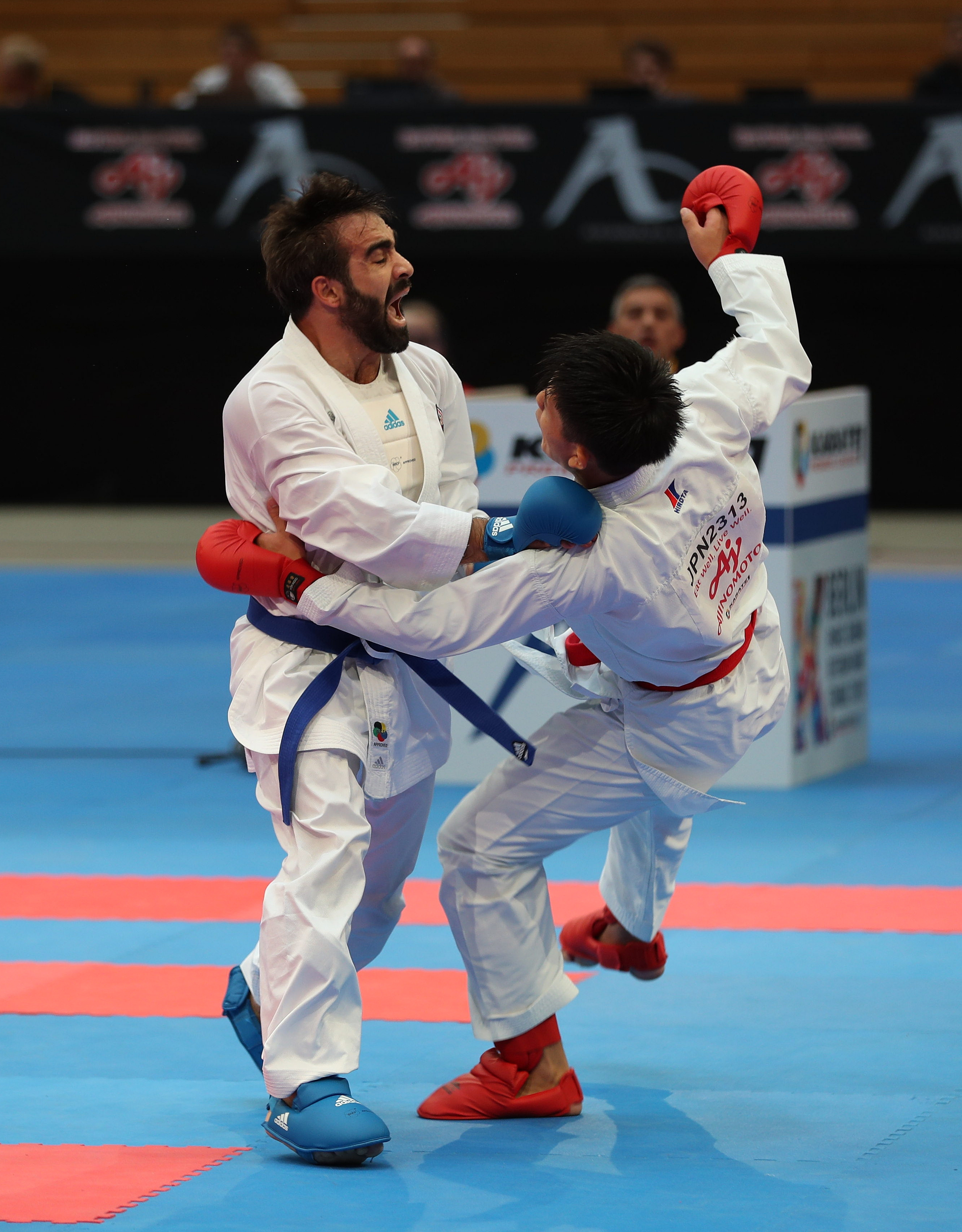
Aghayev hitting Japanese karateka Yusei Sakiyama at 2018 German Open

At the first championship of the Republic, Aghayev won an overwhelming victory over all his rivals and was noted by the President of the National Karate Federation, Yashar Bashirov, who saw great potential in him and his unusual fighting tactics. Aghayev was very diligent and had the will to win, but he lacked international experience. He first took part in the National Team in 1997, at the open World Cup in Miskolc, Hungary. His first performances were not successful at the international level competition, but the next year he won the Open Championship of England and performed very well from then on.

At his first World Championship among Cadets and Juniors, which was held in 2001 in Athens, he won 3rd place in the team event, and the following year became the European Champion. Thus, up to this day, he holds the lead in his weight class. Despite his young age, he managed to achieve all of the highest sporting victories in karate; he is a multiple European Champion and repeated as World Champion. At one World Championship he was able to win two gold medals. This happened in 2008 at the 18th World Championship in Tokyo, when he won in the 70 kg weight category and in the open category. The President of the World Karate Federation, Antonio Espinós called him the "Diamond of the Karate World."

Hidayat Shabanov, a senior team coach, played an important role in Aghayev's career. For more than eight years, Shabanov trained him and shared in his victories. For outstanding sports achievements at the international arena, Aghayev has repeatedly received awards from the National Olympic Committee, the Ministry of Youth and Sport of Azerbaijan Republic, and he ranked amongst the ten best sportsmen of the country for several consecutive years. From the official sponsor of the Federation, the International Bank of Azerbaijan, he received the keys to a new apartment in one of the elite areas of the city, as well as an Audi Q7.

Currently, Aghayev is captain of the Azerbaijan team, and continuing to train and perform under the guidance of new senior coach Rahman Hatamov.

In June 2015, Azerbaijan was the host country for the inaugural European Games. Competing in karate, more specifically Kumite for 75 kilograms, Aghayev earned a gold medal.

In August 2021, Aghayev competed in the inaugural Olympics Karate event, earning silver medal in the Men's kumite 75 kg division.

== Championships and accomplishments ==
- Karate Combat
  - Karate Combat Welterweight Champion (One time; current)
  - Interim Karate Combat Welterweight Champion (One time; former)
- World Karate Championships
  - 2021 World Karate Championships (bronze) Team kumite
  - 2018 World Karate Championships (bronze) Kumite -75 kg
  - 2016 World Karate Championships (gold) Kumite -75 kg
  - 2012 World Karate Championships (silver) Kumite -75 kg
  - 2010 World Karate Championships (silver) Team kumite
  - 2010 World Karate Championships (gold) Kumite -75 kg
  - 2008 World Karate Championships (gold) Kumite open
  - 2008 World Karate Championships (gold) Kumite -70 kg
  - 2006 World Karate Championships (gold) Kumite -70 kg
- European Karate Championships
  - 2022 European Karate Championships (silver) Team kumite
  - 2021 European Karate Championships (silver) Kumite -75 kg
  - 2021 European Karate Championships (bronze) Team kumite
  - 2019 European Karate Championships (silver) Kumite -75 kg
  - 2018 European Karate Championships (gold) Kumite -75 kg
  - 2016 European Karate Championships (gold) Kumite -75 kg
  - 2015 European Karate Championships (gold) Kumite -75 kg
  - 2015 European Karate Championships (bronze) Team kumite
  - 2013 European Karate Championships (gold) Kumite -75 kg
  - 2012 European Karate Championships (bronze) Kumite -75 kg
  - 2012 European Karate Championships (bronze) Team kumite
  - 2011 European Karate Championships (bronze) Kumite -75 kg
  - 2010 European Karate Championships (gold) Kumite -75 kg
  - 2010 European Karate Championships (bronze) Team kumite
  - 2009 European Karate Championships (gold) Kumite -75 kg
  - 2009 European Karate Championships (bronze) Team kumite
  - 2008 European Karate Championships (gold) Kumite open
  - 2008 European Karate Championships (bronze) Team kumite
  - 2007 European Karate Championships (gold) Kumite open
  - 2007 European Karate Championships (gold) Kumite -70 kg
  - 2005 European Karate Championships (gold) Kumite open
  - 2004 European Karate Championships (gold) Kumite -65 kg
- Summer Olympic Games
  - 2020 Summer Olympics (silver) Kumite -75 kg
- World Games
  - 2013 World Games (gold) Kumite -75 kg
- World Combat Games
  - 2013 World Combat Games (gold) Kumite -75 kg
- European Games
  - 2019 European Games (silver) Kumite -75 kg
  - 2015 European Games (gold) Kumite -75 kg
- Islamic Solidarity Games
  - Islamic Solidarity Games (gold) Kumite -75 kg
  - Islamic Solidarity Games (gold) Kumite -75 kg
  - Islamic Solidarity Games (bronze) Kumite -75 kg

== Karate Combat record ==
Professional record breakdown
5 matches	5 wins	0 losses
By knockout	0	0
By decision	5	0

Res.	Record	Opponent	Method	Event	Date	Round	Time	Location	Notes
Win	5–0	Josh Quayhagen	Decision (unanimous)	Karate Combat 40	June 24, 2023	5	3:00	Miami, Florida, United States	Won and unified the Karate Combat Welterweight Championship.
Win	4–0	Raymond Daniels	Decision (unanimous)	Karate Combat 37	December 17, 2022	5	3:00	Orlando, Florida, United States	Won the interim Karate Combat Welterweight Championship.
Win	3–0	Davy Dona	Decision (unanimous)	Karate Combat Season 4 Event 4	June 25, 2022	3	3:00	Orlando, Florida, United States	
Win	2–0	Zsolt Habda	Decision (unanimous)	Karate Combat Season 4 Event 3	June 11, 2022	3	3:00	Orlando, Florida, United States	
Win	1–0	Dionicio Gustavo	Decision (unanimous)	Karate Combat: Genesis	February 3, 2018	3	3:00	Budapest, Hungary	

== See also ==
- Karate World Championships
- European Karate Championships
