= Okay Arpa =

Turkish karateka (born 1977)

- Born: 15 July 1977 (age 49); Kayseri, Turkey
- Nationality: Turkish
- Division: +84 kg
- Style: Karate – Kumite

Okay Arpa (born 15 July 1977) is a Turkish karateka competing in the kumite +84 kg division. He has represented Turkey in multiple international events, achieving success in both individual and team kumite categories.

== Career ==
Arpa won his first major international medal in 1998, earning bronze in the men's +80 kg event at the 1998 European Karate Championships in Belgrade, Serbia. He claimed silver in the same weight class at the 2000 European Karate Championships held in Istanbul, Turkey. At the 2001 Mediterranean Games in Tunis, Tunisia, he secured a bronze medal in the open weight division.

In 2004, Arpa took silver in the open category and bronze in the team kumite at the 2004 European Karate Championships in Moscow, Russia. He won gold in the team kumite at the 2006 European Karate Championships in Zagreb, Croatia. In 2008, he earned a bronze medal in the +80 kg event at the 2008 European Karate Championships in Tallinn, Estonia, and became a world champion in team kumite at the 2008 World Karate Championships in Tokyo, Japan.

Arpa added another bronze medal in the +84 kg category at the 2009 European Karate Championships in Zagreb, and won team kumite gold at the 2010 European Karate Championships in Athens, Greece. In 2011, he helped Turkey win the European Regions Karate Championships in Ankara, Turkey.

Outside of competition, Arpa works as a physical education teacher at a primary school in Üsküdar, Istanbul.
