= Snežana Pantić =

Serbian karateka (1978–2022)

Medal record

Women's karate

Representing Yugoslavia

World Championships
Gold medal – first place	2002 Madrid	Kumite open

European Championships
Bronze medal – third place	1999 Euboea	Kumite -60 kg
Silver medal – second place	2000 Istanbul	Kumite team

Mediterranean Games
Bronze medal – third place	2001 Tunis	Kumite -60 kg

Representing Serbia and Montenegro

World Games
Gold medal – first place	2005 Duisburg	Kumite -60 kg

European Championships
Silver medal – second place	2002 Tallinn	Kumite team
Silver medal – second place	2003 Bremen	Kumite team
Silver medal – second place	2004 Moscow	Kumite -60 kg
Silver medal – second place	2005 Tenerife	Kumite open
Bronze medal – third place	2004 Moscow	Kumite open

Mediterranean Games
Gold medal – first place	2005 Almería	Kumite -60 kg

Representing Serbia

World Championships
Bronze medal – third place	2006 Tampere	Kumite open

European Championships
Gold medal – first place	2006 Stavanger	Kumite open
Bronze medal – third place	2006 Stavanger	Kumite team

Snežana Pantić (Serbian Cyrillic: Снежана Пантић; nee Perić; 18 June 1978 – 9 February 2022) was a Serbian professional karate competitor and the most successful Serbian female karateka.

== Biography ==
Born in Zrenjanin, SR Serbia, SFR Yugoslavia, she resided in Belgrade.

Pantić married FK Partizan goalkeeper Đorđe Pantić in 2006. They had a daughter, Marija "Manja" born 2007. Pantić was a member of Athlete Commission in World Karate Federation.

She died from breast cancer on 9 February 2022, at the age of 43.

== Achievements ==
=== 2006 results ===
- 1st place European Championships (Stavanger, Norway), open category
- 3rd place European Championships (Stavanger, Norway), team
- 3rd place World Championships (Tampere, Finland), open category

=== 2005 results ===
- 1st place Mediterranean Games (Almería, Spain),-60 kg category
- 2nd place European championships (Tenerife, Spain) open category
- 1st place World Games (Duisburg, Germany) -60 kg category

=== 2004 results ===
- 2nd place European Championships (Moscow, Russia) -60 kg category
- 3rd place European Championships (Moscow, Russia) open category
- 2nd place University World Championships (Belgrade, Serbia)

=== 2003 results ===
- 2nd place European Championships, team, (Bremen, Germany)
- 1st place Yugoslavian Championships, open category
- 1st place European Club Championships with karate club "Dijamant" (Oviedo, Spain)
- 1st place Zagreb Karate Fest – Top Ten (open weight)

=== 2002 results ===
- 1st place World Championships (Madrid, Spain), open category
- 2nd place European Championships (Tallinn, Estonia), team
- 3rd place Mediterranean Championships (Rijeka, Croatia) -60 kg category
- 3rd place University World Championships (Puebla, Mexico) -60 kg category
- 2nd place University World Championships (Puebla, Mexico), team
- 1st place European Club Championships, with karate club "Dijamant" (Giör, Hungary)

=== 2001 results ===
- 2nd place European Club Championships, with karate club "Dijamant" (Istanbul, Turkey)
- 3rd place Mediterranean Games, (Tunis, Tunis), -60 kg category

=== 2000 results ===
- 1st place Yugoslavian Championship, -60 kg category
- 2nd place University World Championship, Kyoto, [Japan], team
- 2nd place European Championships (Istanbul, Turkey) team

=== 1999 results ===
- 1st place Yugoslavian Championships, -60 kg and open category
- 3rd place European Championships (Chalkida, Greece), -60 kg category
