= Yusuf Başer =

Turkish martial artist

- Born: February 4, 1980 (age 46); Istanbul, Turkey
- Nationality: Turkish
- Division: Open
- Style: Karate Kumite
- Team: Istanbul BB SK

Yusuf Başer
Medal record

Men's Karate

World Championships
Gold medal – first place	2008 Tokyo	Kumite team

European Championships
Gold medal – first place	2009 Zagreb	Kumite team
Bronze medal – third place	2007 Bratislava	Kumite open
Gold medal – first place	2006 Stavanger	Kumite team
Bronze medal – third place	2005 Tenerife	Kumite open
Bronze medal – third place	2004 Moscow	Kumite open

Mediterranean Games
Bronze medal – third place	2005 Almeria	Kumite open

Islamic Solidarity Games
Gold medal – first place	2005 Mecca	Kumite open

Tournaments
Bronze medal – third place	2005 Rotterdam	Kumite +80kg

Yusuf Başer (born February 4, 1980, in Istanbul, Turkey) is a Turkish karateka competing in the kumite open division. He is a member of the İstanbul Büyükşehir Belediyesi S.K.

== Achievements ==
2010

- Bronze 1st World Clubs Cup - November 20, Istanbul TUR - kumite team
- Bronze 8th European Karate Regions Championships - May 29, Warsaw POL - kumite team

2009

- Gold 7th European Karate Regions Championships - May 30, Madrid ESP - kumite team
- Gold 44th European Championships - May 8, Zagreb CRO - kumite team

2008

- Gold 19th World Championships - November 13, Tokyo JAP - kumite team

2007

- Bronze 42nd European Championships - May 4, Bratislava SVK - kumite open

2006

- Gold 41st European Championships - May 5, Stavanger NOR - kumite team

2005

- Bronze 15th Mediterranean Games - June 25, Almeria ESP - kumite open
- Bronze 40th European Championships - May 13, Tenerife ESP - kumite open
- Gold Islamic Solidarity Games - April 9–14, Mecca SAU - kumite open
- Bronze Dutch Open -March 12, Rotterdam NED - kumite +80 kg

2004

- Bronze 39th European Championships - May 7, Moscow, RUS - kumite open

2002

- Bronze 9th Balkan Senior Karate Championships - September 28 - kumite +80 kg
- Gold 9th Balkan Senior Karate Championships - September 28 - kumite team
