= Jonathan Horne =

German karateka (born 1989)

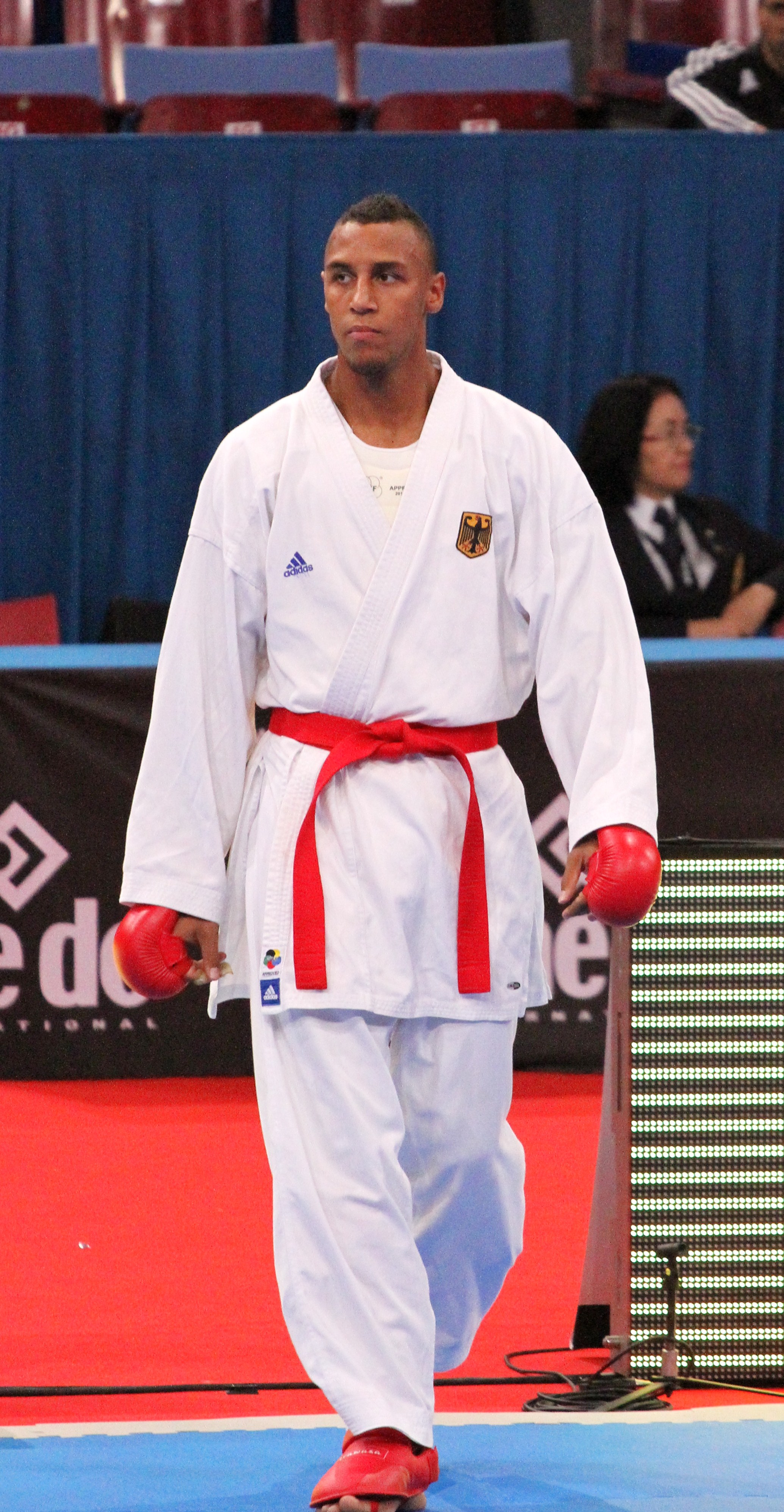
- Horne in 2012

Personal information
- National team: Germany
- Born: 17 January 1989 (age 37) Kaiserslautern, West Germany
- Website: jonathan-horne.de

Sport
- Country: Germany
- Sport: Karate
- Weight class: +84 kg
- Events: Kumite; Team kumite
Medal record
Men's karate
Representing Germany
World Championships
Gold medal – first place	2018 Madrid	+84 kg
Silver medal – second place	2014 Bremen	Team kumite
Bronze medal – third place	2008 Tokyo	+80 kg
Bronze medal – third place	2016 Linz	Team kumite
European Championships
Gold medal – first place	2008 Tallinn	+80 kg
Gold medal – first place	2010 Athens	+84 kg
Gold medal – first place	2011 Zürich	+84 kg
Gold medal – first place	2012 Adeje	+84 kg
Gold medal – first place	2012 Adeje	Team kumite
Gold medal – first place	2016 Montpellier	+84 kg
Gold medal – first place	2019 Guadalajara	+84 kg
Gold medal – first place	2021 Poreč	+84 kg
Bronze medal – third place	2015 Istanbul	+84 kg
Bronze medal – third place	2013 Budapest	+84 kg
Bronze medal – third place	2013 Budapest	Team kumite
Bronze medal – third place	2014 Tampere	+84 kg
Bronze medal – third place	2014 Tampere	Team kumite
World Games
Gold medal – first place	2009 Kaohsiung	+80 kg
Gold medal – first place	2013 Cali	+84 kg
European Games
Silver medal – second place	2015 Baku	+84 kg
Bronze medal – third place	2019 Minsk	+84 kg

Jonathan Horne (born 17 January 1989) is a German karateka. At the 2018 World Karate Championships in Madrid, Spain, he won the gold medal in the men's +84 kg event. He represented Germany at the 2020 Summer Olympics in Tokyo, Japan.

He also won the gold medal in his event on seven occasions at the European Karate Championships, most recently at the 2021 European Karate Championships held in Poreč, Croatia.

== Career ==
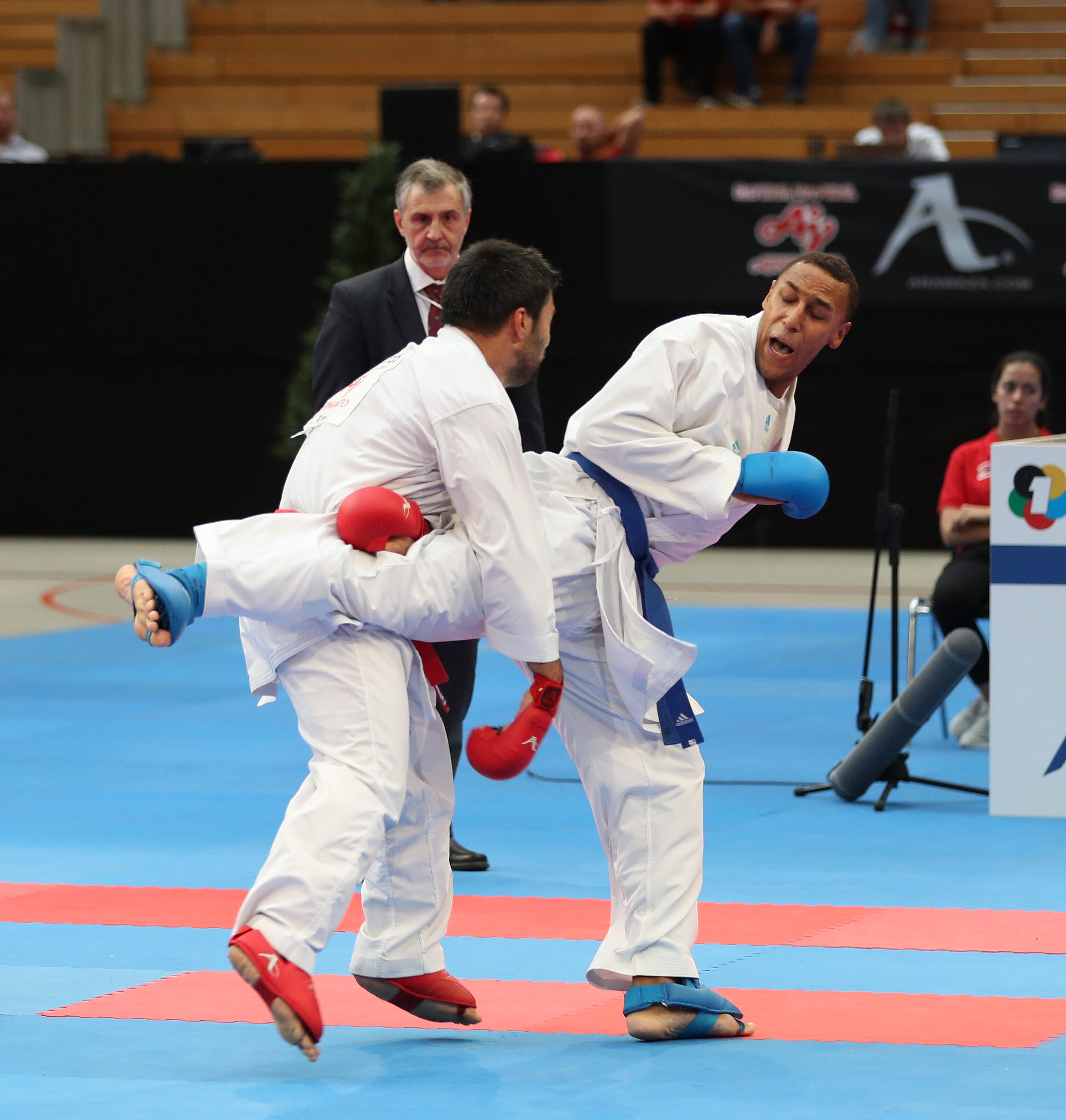
Jonathan Horn versus Shahin Atamov at the Karate 1 Premier League 2018 in Berlin

Horne won the gold medal in the men's kumite +80 kg event at the 2009 World Games held in Kaohsiung, Taiwan.

In 2013, Horne represented Germany at the World Games held in Cali, Colombia and he won the gold medal in the men's kumite +84 kg event. In 2017, he competed in the men's kumite +84 kg event at the World Games held in Wrocław, Poland. He was eliminated in the elimination round.

Horne won the silver medal in the men's +84 kg event at the 2015 European Games held in Baku, Azerbaijan. At the 2019 European Games held in Minsk, Belarus, he won one of the bronze medals in the men's +84 kg event.

In 2019, Horne won the gold medal in his event at the European Karate Championships held in Guadalajara, Spain.

In 2021, at the 2020 Summer Olympics while fighting Gogita Arkania in the men's +75 kg event, Horne broke his right arm leaving him unable to continue.

== Achievements ==
Year	Competition	Venue	Rank	Event
2008	European Championships	Tallinn, Estonia	1st	Kumite +80 kg
2008	World Championships	Tokyo, Japan	3rd	Kumite +80 kg
2009	World Games	Kaohsiung, Taiwan	1st	Kumite +80 kg
2010	European Championships	Athens, Greece	1st	Kumite +84 kg
2011	European Championships	Zürich, Switzerland	1st	Kumite +84 kg
2012	European Championships	Adeje, Spain	1st	Kumite +84 kg
2012	European Championships	Adeje, Spain	1st	Team kumite
2013	European Championships	Budapest, Hungary	3rd	Kumite +84 kg
2013	European Championships	Budapest, Hungary	3rd	Team kumite
2013	World Games	Cali, Colombia	1st	Kumite +84 kg
2014	European Championships	Tampere, Finland	3rd	Kumite +84 kg
2014	European Championships	Tampere, Finland	3rd	Team kumite
2014	World Championships	Bremen, Germany	2nd	Team kumite
2015	European Championships	Istanbul, Turkey	3rd	Kumite +84 kg
2015	European Games	Baku, Azerbaijan	2nd	Kumite +84 kg
2016	European Championships	Montpellier, France	1st	Kumite +84 kg
2016	World Championships	Linz, Austria	3rd	Team kumite
2018	World Championships	Madrid, Spain	1st	Kumite +84 kg
2019	European Championships	Guadalajara, Spain	1st	Kumite +84 kg
2019	European Games	Minsk, Belarus	3rd	Kumite +84 kg
2021	European Championships	Poreč, Croatia	1st	Kumite +84 kg
