= Ömer Kemaloğlu =

Turkish karateka (born 1987)

- Born: Ömer Kemaloğlu; April 2, 1987 (age 39); Istanbul, Turkey
- Nationality: Turkish
- Division: -65 kg
- Style: Karate Kumite
- Team: Istanbul BB SK

Ömer Kemaloğlu (born April 2, 1987) is a European champion Turkish karateka competing in the kumite -65 kg division. He is a member of the İstanbul Büyükşehir Belediyesi S.K. Now he is physical education teacher in Sultangazi Cumhuriyet Anatolian Highschool

== Achievements ==
2013

- Gold XVII Mediterranean Games – June 28, Mersin TUR – kumite -67 kg
- Silver 48th European Karate Championships – May 9, Budapest HUN – kumite -67 kg
- Bronze Karate1 Paris – January 19, Paris FRA – kumite -67 kg

2012

- Silver 47th European Karate Championships – May 10, Adeje ESP – kumite -67 kg
- Silver 16th Balkan Children & Seniors Karate Championships – March 16, Herceg Novi MNE – kumite -67 kg

2011

- Bronze 9th European Karate Regions Championships – June 4, Ankara TUR – kumite team

2010

- Silver 1st World Clubs Cup – November 20, Istanbul TUR – kumite team

2009

- Bronze World Games in Kaohsiung – July 25, Taiwan- kumite -65 kg

2008

- Gold 43rd European Championships – May 2 Tallinn EST- kumite -65 kg
- Silver Open de Paris – January 19, Coubertin FRA – kumite -65 kg

2007

- Bronze German Open – September 15, Aschaffenburg GER – kumite -65 kg
- Gold 34th European Cadet & Junior Championships – February 9, İzmir TUR – kumite junior -65 kg
- Silver 34th European Cadet & Junior Championships – February 9, İzmir TUR – kumite junior team

2006

- Silver 41st European Championships – May 5, Stavanger NOR7 – kumite -60 kg
- Bronze 33rd European Cadet & Junior Karate Championships – February 17, Podgorica, Serbia and Montenegro – kumite junior -65 kg

2005

- Gold 4th World Junior & Cadet Karate Championships – November 11 – kumite junior team
- Silver 32nd European Cadet & Junior Karate Championships – February 11, Thessaloniki GRE – kumite cadet -65 kg

2004

- Bronze 31st European Cadet & Junior Karate Championships – February 13, Rijeka CRO – kumite cadet -65 kg
