= Yavuz Karamollaoğlu =

Turkish karateka (born 1980)

- Born: November 29, 1980 (age 45); Istanbul, Turkey
- Nationality: Turkish
- Division: -84 kg
- Style: Karate Kumite
- Team: Kocaeli B.B. Kağıtspor

Other information
- University: Trakya University

Yavuz Karamollaoğlu
Medal record

Men's Karate

Representing Turkey

World Championships
Bronze medal – third place	2012 Paris	Kumite -84 kg
Silver medal – second place	2010 Belgrade	Kumite -84 kg
Bronze medal – third place	2004 Monterrey	Kumite -75 kg

European Championships
Gold medal – first place	2010 Athens	Kumite team
Gold medal – first place	2009 Zagreb	Kumite team
Silver medal – second place	2008 Tallinn	Kumite open
Gold medal – first place	2006 Stavanger	Kumite team
Silver medal – second place	2005 Tenerife	Kumite -75 kg
Bronze medal – third place	2004 Moscow	Kumite -75 kg
Silver medal – second place	1999 Euboea	Kumite -75 kg

Islamic Solidarity Games
Gold medal – first place	2005 Mecca	Kumite -75 kg
Bronze medal – third place	2005 Palembang	Kumite -84 kg

Yavuz Karamollaoğlu (born November 29, 1980, in Istanbul, Turkey) is a Turkish karateka competing in the kumite -84 kg division. He is a member of the Kocaeli B.B. Kağıtspor.

He won the bronze medal in the -84 kg division at the 2013 Islamic Solidarity Games held in Palembang, Indonesia.

== Achievements ==
Year	Competition	Venue	Position	Notes
1999	34th European Championships	Euboea, Greece	2nd	kumite -75 kg
1999	World Junior and Cadet Championships	Sofia, Bulgaria	1st	kumite junior team
1999	World Junior and Cadet Championships	Sofia, Bulgaria	2nd	kumite junior -75 kg
2001	2nd World Junior & Cadet Championships	Athens, Greece	2nd	kumite junior -80 kg
2002	9th Balkan Senior Championships		1st	kumite junior team
2004	39th European Championships	Moscow, Russia	3rd	kumite -75 kg
2004	17th World Championships	Monterey, Mexico	3rd	kumite -75 kg
2005	1st Islamic Solidarity Games	Mecca, Saudi Arabia	3rd	kumite -75 kg
2005	40th European Championships	Tenerife, Spain	2nd	kumite -75 kg
2006	41st European Championships	Stavanger, Norway	1st	kumite team
2008	43rd European Championships	Tallinn, Estonia	2nd	kumite open
2009	44th European Championships	Zagreb, Croatia	1st	kumite team
2009	7th European Regions Championships	Madrid, Spain	2nd	kumite team
2010	45th European Championships	Athens, Greece	1st	kumite team
2010	8th European Regions Championships	Warsaw, Poland	2nd	kumite team
2010	20th World Championships	Belgrade, Serbia	2nd	kumite -84 kg
2011	9th European Regions Championships	Ankara, Turkey	1st	kumite team
2012	16th Balkan Children & Seniors Championships	Herceg Novi, Montenegro	3rd	kumite team
2012	21st World Championships	Paris, France	3rd	kumite team
2013	3rd Islamic Solidarity Games	Palembang, Indonesia	3rd	kumite -84 kg
