= Enes Erkan =

Turkish karateka (born 1987)

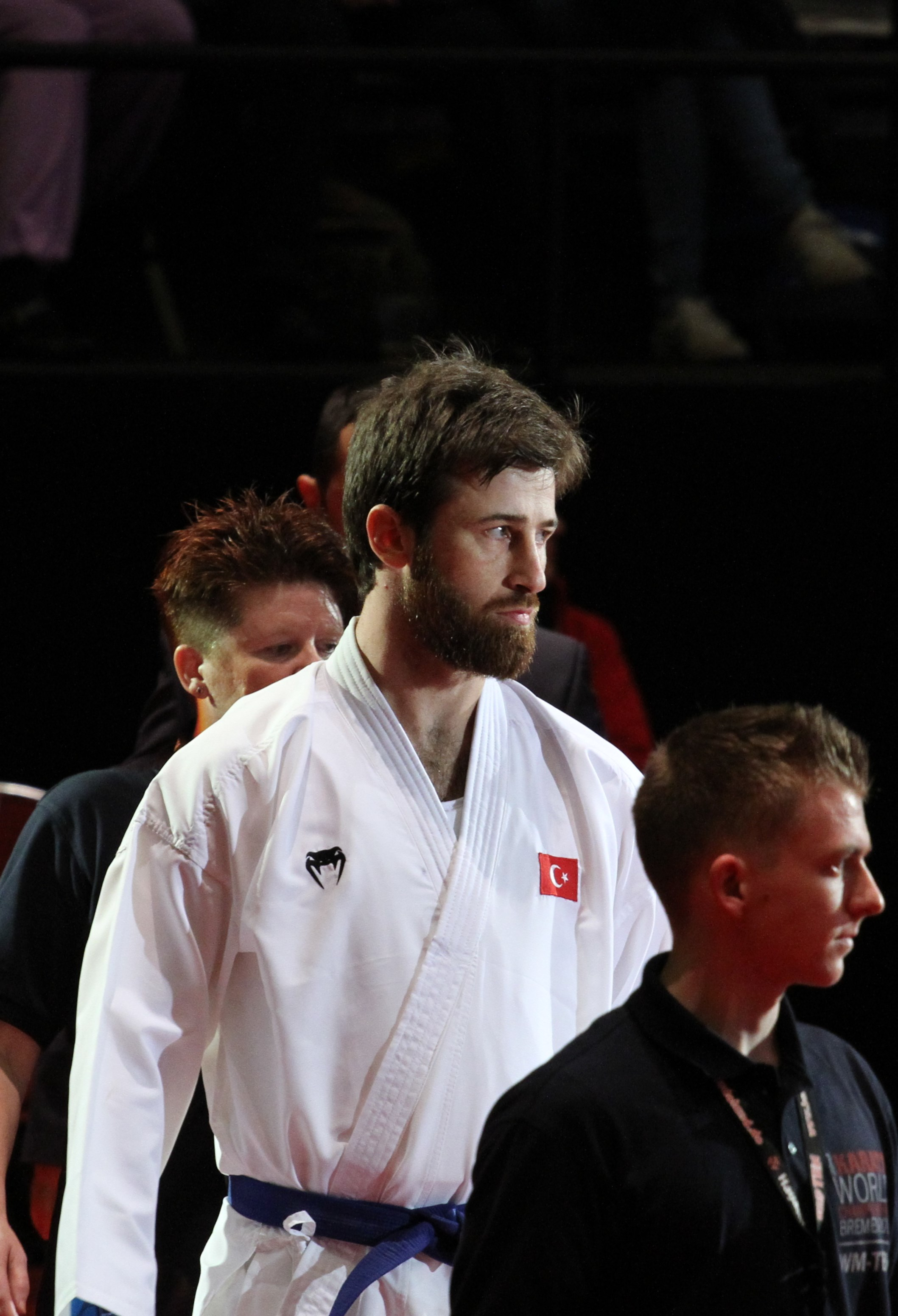
- Born: 10 May 1987 (age 39); Adapazarı, Turkey
- Nationality: Turkish
- Division: +84 kg
- Style: Karate Kumite
- Team: Sakarya Büyükşehir Belediyesi S.K.

Other information
- University: Sakarya University

Enes Erkan
Medal record

Men's Karate

World Championships
Gold medal – first place	2014 Bremen	Kumite +84 kg
Gold medal – first place	2012 Paris	Kumite +84 kg

European Championships
Silver medal – second place	2017 İzmit	Kumite +84 kg
Gold medal – first place	2014 Tampere	Kumite +84 kg
Gold medal – first place	2013 Budapest	Kumite +84 kg
Bronze medal – third place	2012 Adeje	Kumite +84 kg
Silver medal – second place	2009 Zagreb	Kumite -84 kg
Bronze medal – third place	2008 Tallinn	Kumite -80 kg

European Games
Gold medal – first place	2015 Baku	Kumite +84 kg

Mediterranean Games
Silver medal – second place	2013 Mersin	Kumite +84 kg

Tournaments
Silver medal – second place	2010 Paris	Kumite -84 kg
Bronze medal – third place	2007 Aschaffenburg	Kumite -80 kg
Gold medal – first place	2007 Monza	Kumite -80 kg

World Junior and Cadet Championships
Gold medal – first place	2007 Istanbul	Kumite -80 kg
Bronze medal – third place	2003 Marseille	Kumite -70 kg

European Junior and Cadet Championships
Gold medal – first place	2008 Trieste	Kumite -80 kg
Bronze medal – third place	2005 Thessaloniki	Kumite -75 kg

Enes Erkan (born 10 May 1987 in Adapazarı, Turkey) is a World and European champion Turkish karateka competing in the kumite +84 kg division. He transferred from the İstanbul Büyükşehir Belediyesi S.K. to the Sakarya Büyükşehir Belediyesi S.K. He studies physical education and sports at Sakarya University.

== Achievements ==
2017

- Silver European Championships – 6 May, İzmit, TUR – kumite +84 kg,

2015

- Gold 1st European Games - 14 June, Baku, AZE - kumite +84 kg

2014

- Gold 2014 World Karate Championships - 5-9 Nov, Bremen, GER - kumite +84 kg
- Gold European Championships - 1–4 May, Tampere, FIN - kumite +84 kg

2013

- Silver XVII Mediterranean Games - 28 June, Mersin TUR - kumite +84 kg
- Gold European Championships - 5–9 May, Budapest, HUN - kumite +84 kg

2012

- Gold World Championships - 21–25 November, Paris, FRA - kumite +84 kg
- Bronze European Championships - 10–13 May, Adeje, ESP - kumite +84 kg

2010

- Silver Open de Paris - 16 January, Paris, FRA - kumite -84 kg

2009

- Silver European Championships - 8 May, Zagreb CRO - kumite -84 kg

2008

- Bronze European Championships - 2 May, Tallinn EST - kumite -80 kg
- Gold European Junior and Cadet Championships - 15 February, Trieste ITA - kumite -80 kg

2007

- Gold World Junior and Cadet Championships - 19 October, Istanbul TUR - kumite -80 kg
- Bronze German Open - 15 September, Aschaffenburg GER - kumite -80 kg
- Gold Italian Open - 31 March, Monza ITA - kumite -80 kg

2005

- Bronze European Junior and Cadet Championships - 11 February, Thessaloniki GRE - kumite -75 kg

2003

- Bronze World Junior and Cadet Championships - 24 October, Marseille FRA - kumite -70 kg
