= Danil Domdjoni =

Croatian karateka (born 1985)

- Born: 8 September 1985 (age 41); Biograd na Moru, Croatia
- Nationality: (Croatia) Croatian
- Style: Karate

Danil Domdjoni (born 8 September 1985) is a Croatian karateka. A native of Biograd na Moru, he is a member of the local Karate klub B. He started competing in the senior category in 2006, and has won both European and World titles in the Male Kumite -60 kg category.

He also won the Zadar County Sportsman of the Year Award for 2007, 2008 and 2009.

== Senior medals ==
Competition	Location	Category	Medal
2006 European Championship	(Norway) Stavanger	Male Kumite -60 kg	Bronze
2007 European Championship	(Slovakia) Bratislava	Male Kumite -60 kg	Bronze
2008 European Championship	(Estonia) Tallinn	Male Kumite -60 kg	Gold
19th World Championship, 2008	(Japan) Tokyo	Male Kumite -60 kg	Gold
2009 European Championship	(Croatia) Zagreb	Male Kumite -60 kg	Gold
2009 World Games	(Taiwan) Kaohsiung	Male Kumite -60 kg	Bronze
2010 European Championship	(Greece) Athens	Male Kumite -60 kg	Bronze
2010 World Combat Games	(China) Beijing	Male Kumite -60 kg	Gold
2011 European Championship	(Switzerland) Zurich	Male Kumite -60 kg	Bronze
2012 European Championship	(Spain) Tenerife	Male Kumite -60 kg	Bronze
2015 European Championship	(Turkey) Istanbul	Male Kumite -67 kg	Bronze
