= Ibrahim Gary =

French karateka

Personal information
- Born: 22 October 1985 (age 40)

Sport
- Country: France
- Sport: Karate
Medal record
Men's karate
Representing France
World Championships
Silver medal – second place	2008 Tokyo	+80 kg

Ibrahim Gary (born 22 October 1985 in Argenteuil, France) is a French karateka who won a silver medal at the 2008 World Karate Championships in the men's kumite +80 kg weight class.
