= Serkan Yağcı =

Turkish karateka (born 1984)

- Born: May 25, 1984 (age 42); Istanbul, Turkey
- Nationality: Turkish
- Weight: 75 kg (165 lb)
- Style: Karate – Kumite
- Team: Istanbul BB SK

Serkan Yağcı (born 25 May 1984) is a Turkish karateka competing in the kumite −75 kg division. He has represented Turkey in multiple international competitions, winning medals at the European Championships, Mediterranean Games and World University Championships.

== Career ==
In 2006, Yağcı won the silver medal in the open weight category and the bronze medal in the −70 kg category at the World University Karate Championships held in New York City, United States. The following year, he claimed the silver medal in the −70 kg kumite at the 2007 European Karate Championships in Bratislava, Slovakia, and won the Italian Open in Monza, Italy.

At the 2008 European Karate Championships in Tallinn, Estonia, he took the bronze medal in the −70 kg category. A year later, he won another bronze in the −75 kg event at the 2009 European Karate Championships in Zagreb, Croatia.

Yağcı captured his first Mediterranean Games title at the 2013 Mediterranean Games in Mersin, Turkey, by winning gold in the −75 kg category. In the same year, he added another European Championships bronze in Budapest, Hungary.

His final major podium finish came in 2014 at the European Karate Championships in Tampere, Finland, where he earned bronze in the −75 kg division.
