= Sara Battaglia (karateka) =

Italian karateka (born 1986)

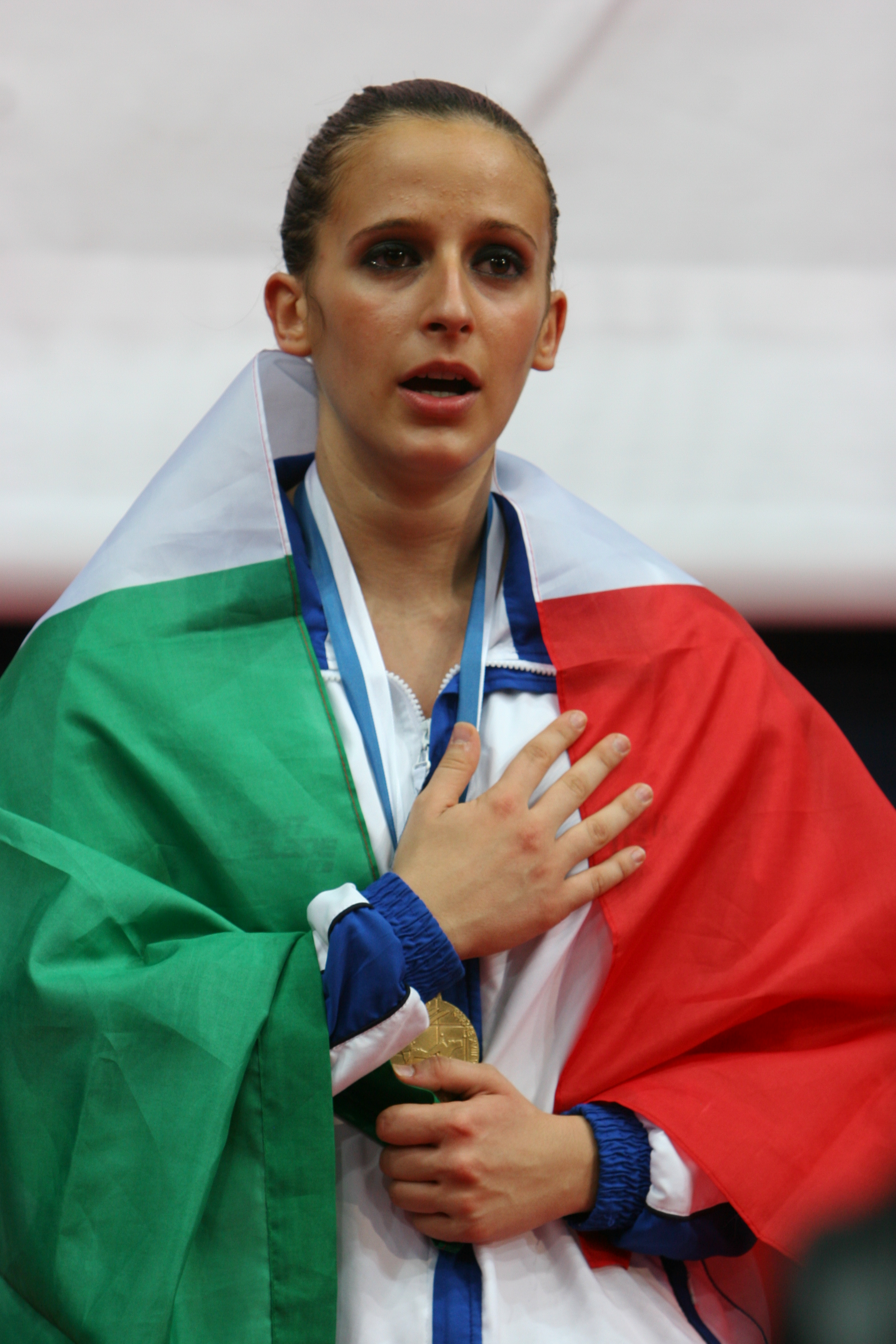

Personal information
- Nationality: Italian
- Born: 14 June 1986 (age 40) Bergamo, Italy

Sport
- Sport: Karate
- Club: G.S. Fiamme Oro
Medal record
Event	1st	2nd	3rd
World Championships	1	2	5
European Championships	3	5	3
World Games	0	0	2
Total	4	7	10

Sara Battaglia (born 14 June 1986) is an Italian female karateka who was World champion at 2006 World Karate Championships.

Battaglia is an athlete of the G.S. Fiamme Oro.
