= Vu Duc Minh Dack =

French karateka (born 1982)

Personal information
- Born: 18 October 1982 (age 43)

Sport
- Country: France
- Sport: Karate
- Event: Kata
Medal record
Men's karate
Representing France
World Championships
Silver medal – second place	2012 Paris	Individual kata
Bronze medal – third place	2008 Tokyo	Individual kata
Bronze medal – third place	2014 Bremen	Individual kata
Bronze medal – third place	2014 Bremen	Team kata
World Games
Silver medal – second place	2009 Kaohsiung	Individual kata

Vu Duc Minh Dack (born 18 October 1982) is a French karateka. He won the silver medal in the men's kata event at the 2012 World Karate Championships held in Paris, France. He also won medals at the World Karate Championships in 2008 and in 2014. He also won medals at many editions of the European Karate Championships.

== Career ==
He won the silver medal in the men's kata event at the 2009 World Games held in Kaohsiung, Taiwan.

In 2015, he lost his bronze medal match in the men's individual kata event at the European Games held in Baku, Azerbaijan. In 2016,he won bronze medal at Karate 1 Premier League in Paris. In 2017, he lost his bronze medal match against Antonio Díaz in the individual kata event at the World Games held in Wrocław, Poland.

== Achievements ==
Year	Competition	Venue	Rank	Event
2008	World Championships	Tokyo, Japan	3rd	Individual kata
2009	World Games	Kaohsiung, Taiwan	2nd	Individual kata
2012	World Championships	Paris, France	2nd	Individual kata
2014	World Championships	Bremen, Germany	3rd	Individual kata
2014	World Championships	Bremen, Germany	3rd	Team kata
