= Luca Valdesi =

Italian karateka (born 1976)

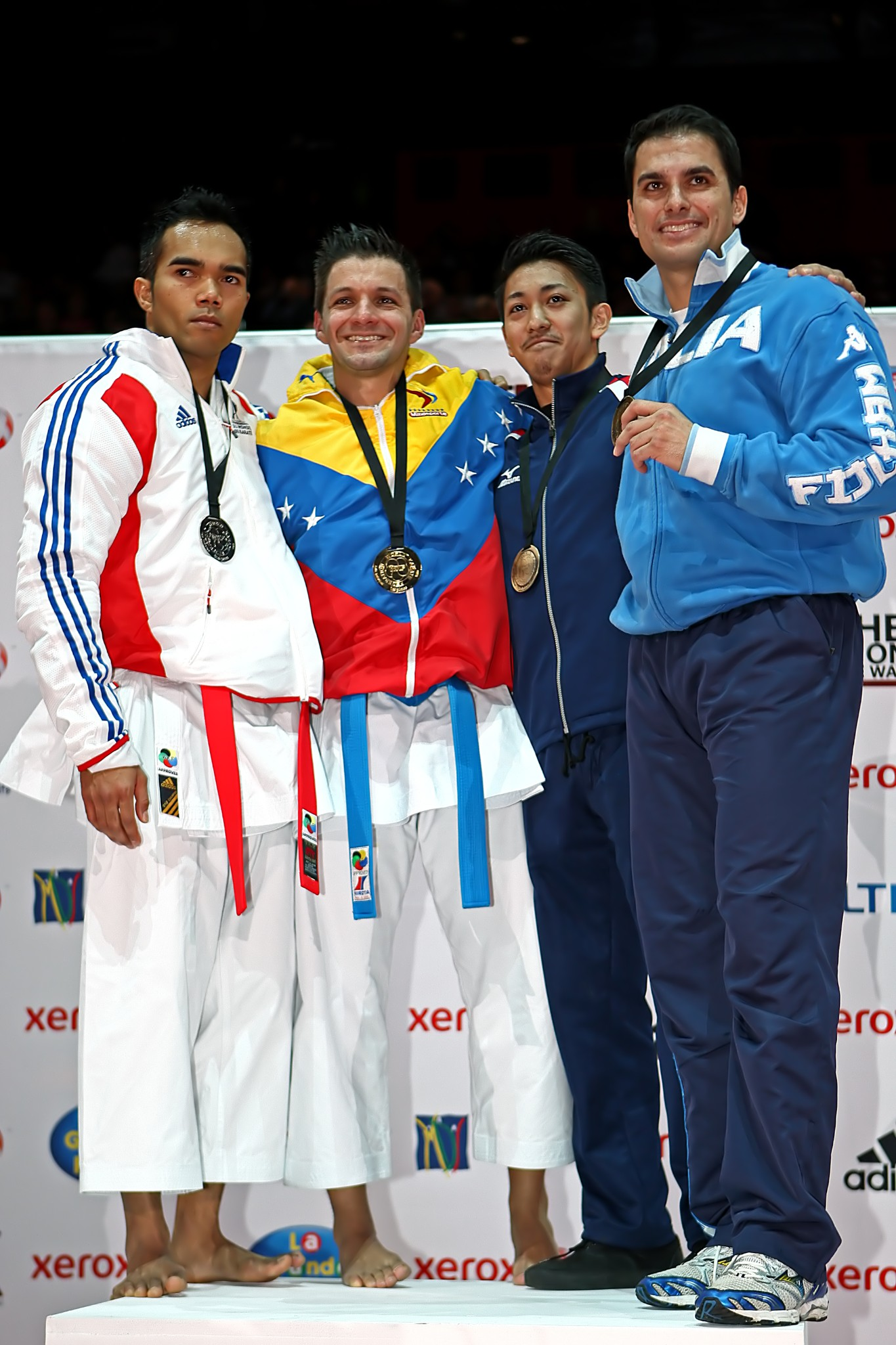
- Born: 18 June 1976 (age 50); Palermo (Sicily) (Italy)
- Style: Shotokan
- Teachers: Claudio Culasso, Professor Pierluigi Aschieri,
- Rank: Black Belt, 6th Dan

Luca Valdesi (born 18 June 1976 in Palermo, Italy) is a Karate world champion in both Team and Individual Kata events. Valdesi began his study of Karate at age six, under the guidance of his father Andrea, at several city gyms.

== Overview ==
In 1995, Valdesi joined the prestigious Karate team of the Fiamme Gialle (the Italian Financial Police). National call-ups began immediately for Valdesi. Soon after the national call-ups, the first international wins arrived, initially with the Karate team of the Fiamme Gialle. Soon after, Valdesi began winning events as an individual. Valdesi has been winning the Italian Individual Championship since 1995 and the European Senior Championship since 2000.

Valdesi is trained by the general coach of the Fiamme Gialle Karate Team, Claudio Culasso and by the general coach of the FIJLKAM National Team, Professor Pierluigi Aschieri, as well as his father, who looks after Valdesi during training sessions and at competitions.

== Outside karate ==
In 2001, Valdesi married dancer Ada Spinella. In February 2004, Valdesi's son, Andrea was born. In November of the same year, Valdesi completed a degree in business economics, crediting his success to the support from his family.
