= 2023 European Karate Championships – Men's 75 kg =

European Karate Championship

Men's 75 kg at the 2023 European Karate Championships
- Venue: Palacio Multiusos de Guadalajara
- Location: Guadalajara, Spain
- Dates: 22, 25 March
- Competitors: 38 from 38 nations

Medalists
gold medal	Andrii Zaplitnyi	Ukraine
silver medal	Erman Eltemur	Turkey
bronze medal	Farid Aghayev	Azerbaijan
bronze medal	Quentin Mahauden	Belgium

The Men's 75 kg competition at the 2023 European Karate Championships was held on 22 and 25 March 2023.

== Results ==
=== Finals ===
Semifinals
(Azerbaijan) Farid Aghayev	1
(Turkey) Erman Eltemur	4
(Ukraine) Andrii Zaplitnyi	4
(Belgium) Quentin Mahauden	4

Final
(Turkey) Erman Eltemur	0
(Ukraine) Andrii Zaplitnyi	2

=== Repechage ===
Repechage 1
(Switzerland) Cyril Maillefer	0
(Sweden) Ricky Haag	3

Repechage 2
(Sweden) Ricky Haag	5
(Spain) Rodrígo Ibáñez	3

Bronze medal
(Spain) Rodrígo Ibáñez	3
(Azerbaijan) Farid Aghayev	8

Repechage 1
(Armenia) Gor Nersisyan	0
(Austria) Stefan Pokorny	2

Repechage 2
(Austria) Stefan Pokorny	3
(Montenegro) Nemanja Mikulić	4

Bronze medal
(Montenegro) Nemanja Mikulić	0
(Belgium) Quentin Mahauden	0

=== Top half ===
==== Section 1 ====
Round of 64
(Germany) Philipp Walger	1
(Denmark) Lucas Busk-Matthiasen	3
(Latvia) Radijs Kostiļevs	2
(Republic of Ireland) Dean O'Mahony	0

Round of 32
(Denmark) Lucas Busk-Matthiasen	0
(Italy) Luigi Busà	1
(Romania) Alexandru Cernea	0
(Portugal) Tiago Duarte	9
(Latvia) Radijs Kostiļevs	1
(Slovenia) Matej Gorišek	0
(Netherlands) Sebastiaan van Teeffelen	0
(Azerbaijan) Farid Aghayev	2

Round of 16
(Italy) Luigi Busà	0
(Portugal) Tiago Duarte	1
(Latvia) Radijs Kostiļevs	1
(Azerbaijan) Farid Aghayev	3

Quarterfinals
(Portugal) Tiago Duarte	0
(Azerbaijan) Farid Aghayev	3

==== Section 2 ====
Round of 64
(Georgia (country)) Valiko Poniava	0
(Sweden) Ricky Haag	2

Round of 32
(Sweden) Ricky Haag	11
(Scotland) Ben Woods	3
(Switzerland) Cyril Maillefer	0
(Turkey) Erman Eltemur	0
(Estonia) Ragnar Audse	1
(North Macedonia) Petar Zaborski	2
(Spain) Rodrígo Ibáñez	2
(Bosnia and Herzegovina) Hamza Turulja	1

Round of 16
(Sweden) Ricky Haag	0
(Turkey) Erman Eltemur	4
(North Macedonia) Petar Zaborski	0
(Spain) Rodrígo Ibáñez	0

Quarterfinals
(Turkey) Erman Eltemur	3
(Spain) Rodrígo Ibáñez	0

=== Bottom half ===
==== Section 3 ====
Round of 64
(Austria) Stefan Pokorny	4
(Poland) Maciej Drążewski	0
(Lithuania) Tomas Balčius	2
(Cyprus) Panayiotis Loizides	1

Round of 32
(Austria) Stefan Pokorny	3
(Israel) Nikola Rogozarski	1
(Armenia) Gor Nersisyan	1
(Ukraine) Andrii Zaplitnyi	3
(Lithuania) Tomas Balčius	2
(Luxembourg) Adil Khaidar	2
(Montenegro) Nemanja Mikulić	0
(Hungary) Gábor Hárspataki	0

Round of 16
(Austria) Stefan Pokorny	0
(Ukraine) Andrii Zaplitnyi	6
(Luxembourg) Adil Khaidar	6
(Montenegro) Nemanja Mikulić	6

Quarterfinals
(Ukraine) Andrii Zaplitnyi	4
(Montenegro) Nemanja Mikulić	0

==== Section 4 ====
Round of 64
(France) Enzo Berthon	0
(Croatia) Ivan Martinac	4

Round of 32
(Croatia) Ivan Martinac	1
(Albania) Bekim Basha	1
(Greece) Dimitris Stolis	0
(England) Brandon Wilkins	7
(Moldova) Daniil Monzalevschii	0
(Slovakia) Maroš Janovčík	4
(Serbia) Ljubiša Marić	3
(Belgium) Quentin Mahauden	10

Round of 16
(Croatia) Ivan Martinac	5
(England) Brandon Wilkins	2
(Slovakia) Maroš Janovčík	3
(Belgium) Quentin Mahauden	4

Quarterfinals
(Croatia) Ivan Martinac	0
(Belgium) Quentin Mahauden	4
