= 2022 European Karate Championships – Men's 75 kg =

European Karate Championship

Men's 75 kg at the 2022 European Karate Championships
- Venue: Karataş Şahinbey Sport Hall
- Location: Gaziantep, Turkey
- Dates: 25–28 May
- Competitors: 38 from 38 nations

Medalists
gold medal	Erman Eltemur	Turkey
silver medal	Brandon Wilkins	England
bronze medal	Elhami Shabani	Kosovo
bronze medal	Luigi Busà	Italy

The Men's 75 kg competition at the 2022 European Karate Championships was held from 25 to 28 May 2022.

== Results ==
=== Finals ===
Semifinals
(Turkey) Erman Eltemur	3
(Bosnia and Herzegovina) Hamza Turulja	0
(England) Brandon Wilkins	2
(Italy) Luigi Busà	0

Final
(Turkey) Erman Eltemur	3
(England) Brandon Wilkins	1

=== Repechage ===
Repechage 1
(Denmark) Mads Viberg Larsen	3
(Kosovo) Elhami Shabani	4

Repechage 2
(Kosovo) Elhami Shabani	2
(Luxembourg) Adil Khaidar	0

Bronze medal
(Kosovo) Elhami Shabani	2
(Bosnia and Herzegovina) Hamza Turulja	1

Repechage 1
(Romania) Alexandru Cernea	1
(Spain) Carlos Bargados	6

Repechage 2
(Spain) Carlos Bargados	4
(Armenia) Davit Makyan	3

Bronze medal
(Spain) Carlos Bargados	2
(Italy) Luigi Busà	3

=== Top half ===
==== Section 1 ====
Round of 64
(Albania) Bekim Basha	3
(Iceland) Ólafur Engilbert Árnason	1
(Sweden) Ricky Haag
(Kosovo) Elhami Shabani

Round of 32
(Albania) Bekim Basha	2
(Latvia) Andreass Melnichenko	1
(Luxembourg) Adil Khaidar	0
(Croatia) Dino Šimunec	0
(Kosovo) Elhami Shabani	4
(Republic of Ireland) Dean O'Mahony	3
(Denmark) Mads Viberg Larsen	1
(Turkey) Erman Eltemur	3

Round of 16
(Albania) Bekim Basha	1
(Luxembourg) Adil Khaidar	2
(Kosovo) Elhami Shabani	2
(Turkey) Erman Eltemur	2

Quarterfinals
(Luxembourg) Adil Khaidar	0
(Turkey) Erman Eltemur	3

==== Section 2 ====
Round of 64
(Bosnia and Herzegovina) Hamza Turulja	5
(Finland) Tuomas Suur-Inkeroinen	1

Round of 32
(Bosnia and Herzegovina) Hamza Turulja	1
(Poland) Bartosz Kedzierski	0
(Portugal) Tiago Almeida	3
(Austria) Stefan Pokorny	3
(Slovakia) David Podsklan	3
(Lithuania) Tomas Balčius	0
(Cyprus) Panayiotis Loizides	0
(Azerbaijan) Rafael Aghayev	0

Round of 16
(Bosnia and Herzegovina) Hamza Turulja	3
(Austria) Stefan Pokorny	1
(Slovakia) David Podsklan	0
(Azerbaijan) Rafael Aghayev	2

Quarterfinals
(Bosnia and Herzegovina) Hamza Turulja	2
(Azerbaijan) Rafael Aghayev	0

=== Bottom half ===
==== Section 3 ====
Round of 64
(Montenegro) Balsa Miličković	1
(Spain) Carlos Bargados	3
(Switzerland) Raffaele Di Gioia	0
(France) Enzo Berthon	6

Round of 32
(Spain) Carlos Bargados	3
(Slovenia) Jaka Gaal	0
(Romania) Alexandru Cernea	5
(England) Brandon Wilkins	7
(France) Enzo Berthon	7
(Israel) Mateja Rogozarski	1
(Armenia) Davit Makyan	5
(Serbia) Đorđe Salapura	2

Round of 16
(Spain) Carlos Bargados	4
(England) Brandon Wilkins	4
(France) Enzo Berthon	0
(Armenia) Davit Makyan	7

Quarterfinals
(England) Brandon Wilkins	2
(Armenia) Davit Makyan	0

==== Section 4 ====
Round of 64
(Bulgaria) Krasen Nikolaev	0
(North Macedonia) Grigor Hadzi-Kimov	1

Round of 32
(North Macedonia) Grigor Hadzi-Kimov	1
(Greece) Dimitrios Stolis	0
(Hungary) Gábor Hárspataki	3
(Germany) Zelal Erdogan	0
(Georgia (country)) Valiko Poniava	1
(Italy) Luigi Busà	3
(Belgium) Quentin Mahauden	4
(Ukraine) Stanislav Horuna	3

Round of 16
(North Macedonia) Grigor Hadzi-Kimov	3
(Hungary) Gábor Hárspataki	2
(Italy) Luigi Busà	4
(Belgium) Quentin Mahauden	3

Quarterfinals
(North Macedonia) Grigor Hadzi-Kimov	2
(Italy) Luigi Busà	5
