= 2025 European Karate Championships – Men's 75 kg =

European Karate Championship

Men's 75 kg at the 2025 European Karate Championships
- Venue: Karen Demirchyan Sports and Concerts Complex
- Location: Yerevan, Armenia
- Dates: 7, 10 May
- Competitors: 38 from 36 nations

Medalists
| gold medal | Ernest Sharafutdinov |
| silver medal | Nemanja Mikulić | Montenegro |
| bronze medal | Betim Maliqi | Kosovo |
| bronze medal | Konstantinos Zygouris | Greece |

The Men's 75 kg competition at the 2025 European Karate Championships was held on 7 and 10 May 2025.

== Results ==
=== Finals ===
Semifinals
(Montenegro) Nemanja Mikulić | 1
(Kosovo) Betim Maliqi | 0
Ernest Sharafutdinov | 0
(France) Enzo Berthon | 0

Final
(Montenegro) Nemanja Mikulić | 0
Ernest Sharafutdinov | 4

=== Repechage ===
Repechage 1
(Switzerland) Nico Sparer | 3
(Denmark) August Von Platen | 2

Repechage 2
(Switzerland) Nico Sparer | 0
(Italy) Daniele De Vivo | 3

Bronze medal
(Italy) Daniele De Vivo | 4
(Kosovo) Betim Maliqi | 5

Repechage 1
(Greece) Konstantinos Zygouris | 0
(Slovakia) David Podsklan | 0

Repechage 2
(Greece) Konstantinos Zygouris | 3
(Turkey) Ömer Faruk Yürür | 3

Bronze medal
(Greece) Konstantinos Zygouris | 0
(France) Enzo Berthon | 0

=== Top half ===
==== Section 1 ====
Round of 64
(Switzerland) Nico Sparer | 2
(Bosnia and Herzegovina) Sanjin Hukara | 0
(Italy) Daniele De Vivo | 2
(North Macedonia) Mursel Misini | 0

Round of 32
(Switzerland) Nico Sparer | 0
(Montenegro) Nemanja Mikulić | 6
(Denmark) August Von Platen | 6
(Latvia) Deniss Kalvāns | 0
(Italy) Daniele De Vivo | 4
(Norway) Mads Sælid | 1
(England) Brandon Wilkins | 1
(Belgium) Quentin Mahauden | 6

Round of 16
(Montenegro) Nemanja Mikulić | 4
(Denmark) August Von Platen | 1
(Italy) Daniele De Vivo | 1
(Belgium) Quentin Mahauden | 0

Quarterfinals
(Montenegro) Nemanja Mikulić | 0
(Italy) Daniele De Vivo | 0

==== Section 2 ====
Round of 64
(Romania) Aurelian Iordache | 3
(Georgia (country)) Valiko Poniava | 2

Round of 32
(Romania) Aurelian Iordache | 4
(Moldova) Farzad Rostami | 3
(Kosovo) Betim Maliqi | 2
(Croatia) Ivan Martinac | 1
(Republic of Ireland) Dean O'Mahony | 1
(Lithuania) Tomas Balčius | 5
(Slovenia) Jaka Gaal | 0
(Ukraine) Andrii Zaplitnyi | 7

Round of 16
(Romania) Aurelian Iordache | 0
(Kosovo) Betim Maliqi | 8
(Lithuania) Tomas Balčius | 1
(Ukraine) Andrii Zaplitnyi | 2

Quarterfinals
(Kosovo) Betim Maliqi | 0
(Ukraine) Andrii Zaplitnyi | 0

=== Bottom half ===
==== Section 3 ====
Round of 64
(Poland) Krzysztof Szewczyk | 1
(Sweden) Ricky Haag | 7
(Slovakia) David Podsklan | 2
(Albania) Bekim Basha | 0

Round of 32
(Sweden) Ricky Haag | 3
(Turkey) Ömer Faruk Yürür | 10
(Germany) Tim Steiner | 0
(Portugal) Tiago Duarte | 9
(Slovakia) David Podsklan | 1
(Netherlands) Ricardo Franken | 0
(Greece) Konstantinos Zygouris | 0
Ernest Sharafutdinov | 9

Round of 16
(Turkey) Ömer Faruk Yürür | 3
(Portugal) Tiago Duarte | 0
(Slovakia) David Podsklan | 0
Ernest Sharafutdinov | 0

Quarterfinals
(Turkey) Ömer Faruk Yürür | 1
Ernest Sharafutdinov | 3

==== Section 4 ====
Round of 64
Devid Nhuyen | 4
(Spain) Joan Just | 1

Round of 32
Devid Nhuyen | 0
(Serbia) Stefan Milunović | 1
(Hungary) Gábor Hárspataki | 6
(Finland) Aaro Tuominen | 0
(Cyprus) Alex Michael | 0
(Armenia) Robert Hovhannisyan | 7
(Austria) Mykyta Hrihorashenko | 2
(France) Enzo Berthon | 6

Round of 16
(Serbia) Stefan Milunović | 0
(Hungary) Gábor Hárspataki | 1
(Armenia) Robert Hovhannisyan | 5
(France) Enzo Berthon | 5

Quarterfinals
(Hungary) Gábor Hárspataki | 0
(France) Enzo Berthon | 0
