= 2024 European Karate Championships – Men's 75 kg =

European Karate Championship

Men's 75 kg at the 2024 European Karate Championships
- Venue: Krešimir Ćosić Hall
- Location: Zadar, Croatia
- Dates: 8, 11 May
- Competitors: 37 from 37 nations

Medalists
gold medal	Ivan Martinac	Croatia
silver medal	Daniele De Vivo	Italy
bronze medal	Enes Bulut	Turkey
bronze medal	Tiago Duarte	Portugal

The Men's 75 kg competition at the 2024 European Karate Championships was held on 8 and 11 May 2024.

== Results ==
=== Finals ===
Semifinals
(Italy) Daniele De Vivo	7
(Montenegro) Nemanja Mikulić	1
(Croatia) Ivan Martinac	3
(North Macedonia) Petar Zaborski	0

Final
(Italy) Daniele De Vivo	0
(Croatia) Ivan Martinac	4

=== Repechage ===
Repechage 1
(Slovenia) Jaka Gaal	2
(England) Brandon Wilkins	5

Repechage 2
(England) Brandon Wilkins	1
(Germany) Tim Steiner	0

Repechage 3
(England) Brandon Wilkins	3
(Turkey) Enes Bulut	9

Bronze medal
(Turkey) Enes Bulut	8
(Montenegro) Nemanja Mikulić	5

Repechage 2
(Poland) Łukasz Bankowski	0
(Austria) Stefan Pokorny	0

Repechage 3
(Austria) Stefan Pokorny	2
(Portugal) Tiago Duarte	5

Bronze medal
(Portugal) Tiago Duarte	2
(North Macedonia) Petar Zaborski	1

=== Top half ===
==== Section 1 ====
Round of 64
(Italy) Daniele De Vivo	1
(Slovenia) Jaka Gaal	0
Milad Jenabi	2
(Kosovo) Fatijon Bajrami	4

Round of 32
(Italy) Daniele De Vivo	4
(England) Brandon Wilkins	0
(Latvia) Radijs Kostiļevs	2
(Germany) Tim Steiner	4
(Kosovo) Fatijon Bajrami	1
(Netherlands) Sebastiaan van Teeffelen	5
(France) Kilian Cizo	3
(Turkey) Enes Bulut	5

Round of 16
(Italy) Daniele De Vivo	6
(Germany) Tim Steiner	0
(Netherlands) Sebastiaan van Teeffelen	2
(Turkey) Enes Bulut	5

Quarterfinals
(Italy) Daniele De Vivo	4
(Turkey) Enes Bulut	3

==== Section 2 ====
Round of 64
Ernest Sharafutdinov	9
(Cyprus) Alex Michael	0

Round of 32
Ernest Sharafutdinov	5
(Armenia) Hayk Karyan	1
(Lithuania) Tomas Balčius	3
(Hungary) Gábor Hárspataki	3
(Switzerland) Salim Tawfik	0
(Montenegro) Nemanja Mikulić	10
Devid Nhuyen	1
(Belgium) Quentin Mahauden	10

Round of 16
Ernest Sharafutdinov	0
(Hungary) Gábor Hárspataki	3
(Montenegro) Nemanja Mikulić	7
(Belgium) Quentin Mahauden	6

Quarterfinals
(Hungary) Gábor Hárspataki	0
(Montenegro) Nemanja Mikulić	3

=== Bottom half ===
==== Section 3 ====
Round of 64
(Denmark) August von Platen-Hallermund	1
(Austria) Stefan Pokorny	2

Round of 32
(Austria) Stefan Pokorny	3
(Republic of Ireland) Dean O' Mahony	2
(Poland) Łukasz Bankowski	0
(Croatia) Ivan Martinac	2
(Sweden) Ricky Haag	4
(Portugal) Tiago Duarte	7
(Serbia) Petar Orlandić	3
(Bosnia and Herzegovina) Hamza Turulja	0

Round of 16
(Austria) Stefan Pokorny	1
(Croatia) Ivan Martinac	3
(Portugal) Tiago Duarte	2
(Serbia) Petar Orlandić	0

Quarterfinals
(Croatia) Ivan Martinac	2
(Portugal) Tiago Duarte	0

==== Section 4 ====
Round of 64
(Spain) Alberto Delestal	1
(Azerbaijan) Farid Aghayev	9

Round of 32
(Azerbaijan) Farid Aghayev	3
(Moldova) Nichita Grigorașenco	1
(Georgia (country)) Valiko Poniava	0
(Slovakia) David Podsklan	3
(Romania) Daniel Santioneanu	0
(North Macedonia) Petar Zaborski	2
(Greece) Evangelos Seremetakis	3
(Ukraine) Andrii Zaplitnyi	3

Round of 16
(Azerbaijan) Farid Aghayev	0
(Slovakia) David Podsklan	8
(North Macedonia) Petar Zaborski	2
(Greece) Evangelos Seremetakis	1

Quarterfinals
(Slovakia) David Podsklan	0
(North Macedonia) Petar Zaborski	1
