= Andrii Zaplitnyi =

Ukrainian karateka (born 2001)

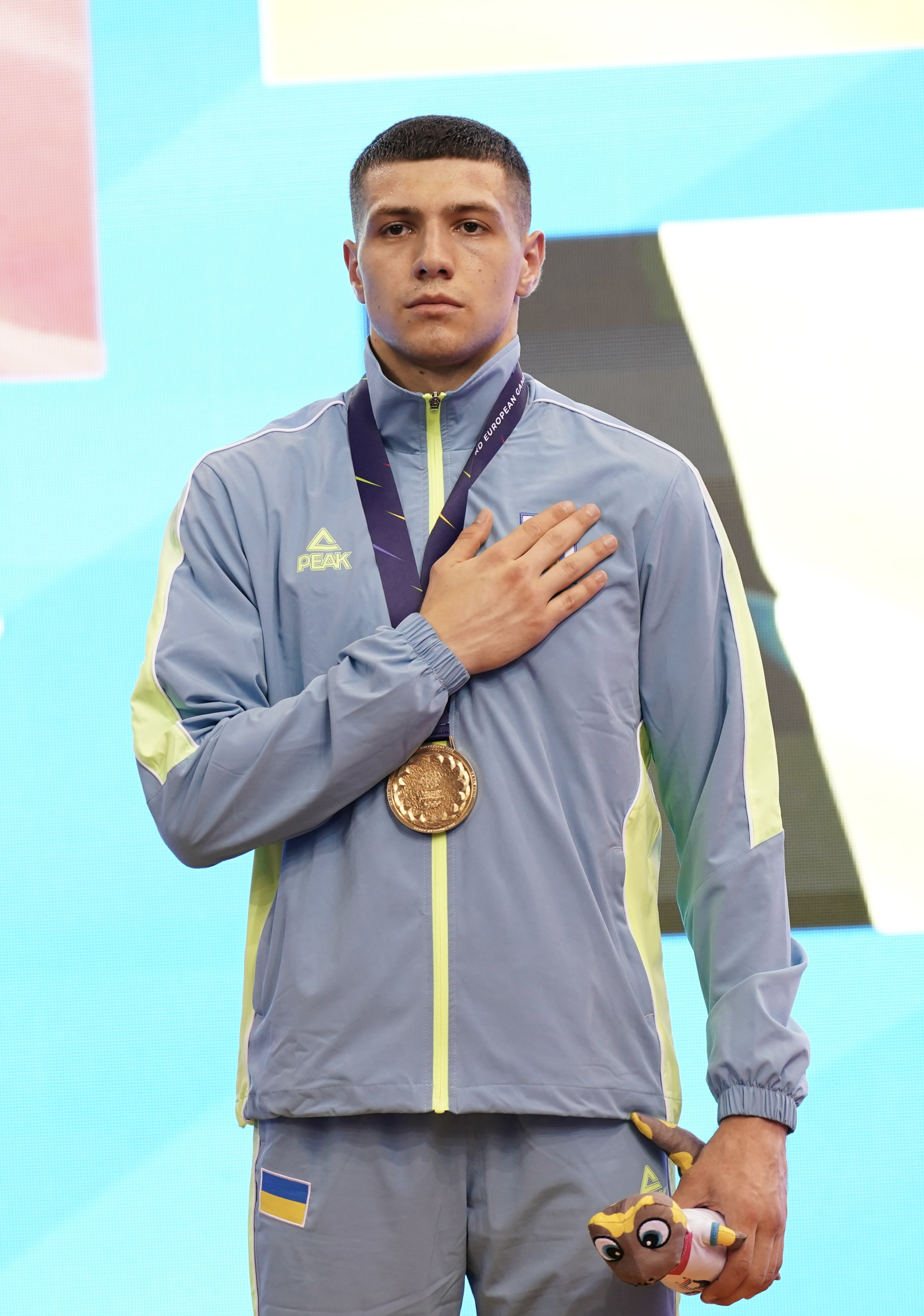

Personal information
- Native name: Заплíтний Андрій Ярославович
- Nickname: ZAP
- Nationality: Ukrainian
- Born: July 13, 2001 (age 25) Chernivtsi, Ukraine
- Education: Chernivtsi University
- Height: 181 cm (5 ft 11 in)
- Weight: 75 kg (165 lb; 11 st 11 lb)

Sport
- Country: Ukraine
- Sport: Karate
- Rank: Master of Sports of Ukraine of international class
- Club: «SC Leader» (Chernivtsi Oblast)
- Coached by: Oleksandr Pikulin, Andrii Lazorenko, Valerii Chobotar
Medal record
Representing Ukraine
Karate
World Championships
Silver medal – second place	2025 Cairo	−75 kg
Bronze medal – third place	2023 Budapest	−75 kg
European Games
Gold medal – first place	2023 Kraków-Małopolska	−75 kg
European Championships
Gold medal – first place	2023 Guadalajara	−75 kg
Gold medal – first place	2023 Guadalajara	Team kumite
Bronze medal – third place	2021 Poreč	Team kumite
Bronze medal – third place	2022 Gaziantep	Team kumite
Bronze medal – third place	2024 Zadar	Team kumite
Bronze medal – third place	2026 Frankfurt	−75 kg
European Junior Championships
Bronze medal – third place	2021 Tampere	U21 −84 kg
Bronze medal – third place	2020 Budapest	U21 −84 kg
Bronze medal – third place	2019 Aalborg	Juniors −76 kg

Andrii Zaplitnyi (Ukrainian: Заплітний Андрій Ярославович, born 13 July 2001 in Chernivtsi, Ukraine) is a Ukrainian karateka competing in the kumite 75 kg division. Vice World Karate Champion, Champion of the European Games 2023, European karate champion. He is currently ranked 2nd in the kumite 75 kg division. He is Master of Sports of Ukraine of international class.

== Personal life ==
Andrii Zaplitnyi studied at secondary school No.27 (Lyceum No.20). In 2018, he began studies at the Faculty of Physical Culture and Human Health at Yuri Fedkovich Chernivtsi National University.

For a significant personal contribution to the development of sports in the region and Ukraine, he was awarded the Honorable Mention (medal) of the Chernivtsi Regional State Administration and the Chernivtsi Regional Council "Grateful Bukovyna".

== Sport career ==
At the age of 7, he started practicing karate with the trainers Oleksandr Pikulin and Andriy Lazorenko in the "Leader" Sports Club. In 2019, he signed a sponsorship contract with HAYASHI.

Zaplitnyi debuted in the senior individual competitions at the 2023 European Karate Championships. In the first bout, Andriy won 3:1 against Gore Nersesyan from Armenia, in the second he defeated Austrian Stefan Pokorny with the score of 6:0, then in the final of the pool, the Ukrainian successfully fought against Montenegrin Nemanja Mikulić with a score of 4:0. In a tough fight to reach the finals against the Belgian Quentin Mahoden, Andrii clinched the victory with a score of 4:4 having priority for taking the point first. In the finals, Zaplitnyi met Turkish Erman Eltemur, who was the 2022 European Champion. Having scored 2 points for a strike with a hand delivered to the head, Andrii Zaplitnyi became the 2023 European Karate Champion.

At the 2023 European Games in Poland, Andriy Zaplitny competed in the category up to 75 kg, where he reached the semi-finals as the leader of the group with three victories. His first opponent in the playoffs was the Belgian Quentin Mahauden, the bronze medalist of the Euro. In a close match, the Ukrainian managed to win. Mahauden realized one yuko and ippon, scoring four points, but Zaplitny was one point ahead of him thanks to five yukos.

In the final fight, the Italian Daniele De Vivo was waiting for Andrii. The opponent earned the first yuko and gained a one-point advantage, but the karatekas exchanged points several times, catching up with each other. In the end, De Vivo took the lead again, but in the last seconds Zaplitnyi already realized the yuko. Thus, thanks to additional indicators, he won with an equal score of 3:3 and for the first time in his career won the "gold" of the European Games.

Andriy Zaplitnyi won 2nd place at the 2025 World Karate Championships in Cairo. Andriy advanced to the playoffs from first place in the group. Andriy defeated Lopes Nario from Angola (4:3), Duarte Tiago from Portugal (3:0) and Somerville Logan from New Zealand (3:2). In the 1/8 finals, Andriy's opponent was Italian Daniele De Vivo. Andriy won in the last seconds of a tense fight – 2:1. In the quarterfinals, Andriy defeated Frenchman Enzo Berthon (No. 3 in the WKF rating) – 4:1.In the semifinals, Andriy faced “neutral” athlete Ernest Sharafutdinov (No. 6 in the WKF rating). The fight was unprincipled and very tense and he won – 6:3. Andriy Zaplitnyi lost to Egyptian Abdalla Abdelaziz – 0:6.

== Sport achievements ==
Competitive record of Andrii Zaplitnyi.

=== World Championships ===
Name	Category	Awards	Year and venue
WKF SENIOR WORLD CHAMPIONSHIPS	Men's kumite -75 kg	Silver	2025 - Cairo (EGY)
WKF SENIOR WORLD CHAMPIONSHIPS	Men's kumite -75 kg	Bronze	2023 - Budapest (HUN)

=== European Games ===
Name	Category	Awards	Year and venue
3rd European Games	Men's kumite -75 kg	Gold	2023 - Bielsko-Biała (POL)

=== European Championships ===
Name	Category	Awards	Year and venue
EKF Senior Championships	Men's team kumite	Bronze	2024 - Zadar (CRO)
EKF Senior Championships	Men's kumite -75 kg	Gold	2023 - Guadalajara (ESP)
EKF Senior Championships	Men's team kumite	Gold	2023 - Guadalajara (ESP)
EKF Senior Championships	Men's team kumite	Bronze	2022 - Gaziantep (TUR)
EKF Junior, Cader & U21 Championships	Men's U21 kumite -84 kg	Bronze	2021 - Tampere (FIN)
EKF Senior Championships	Men's team kumite	Bronze	2021 - Poreč (CRO)
EKF Junior, Cader & U21 Championships	Men's U21 kumite -84 kg	Bronze	2020 - Budapest (HUN)
EKF Junior, Cader & U21 Championships	Men's Junior kumite -76 kg	Bronze	2019 - Aalborg (DEN)

=== Karate1 Premier League and Youth League ===
Category	Awards	Year and venue
Men's kumite -75 kg	Bronze	2025 - Rabat (MAR)
Men's kumite -75 kg	Silver	2025 - Cairo (EGY)
Men's kumite -75 kg	Bronze	2023 - Dublin (IRL)
Men's kumite -75 kg	Bronze	2022 - Baku (AZE)
Men's kumite -75 kg	Bronze	2022 - Matosinhos (POR)
Men's kumite -75 kg	Bronze	2021 - Cairo (EGY)
Men's Junior kumite -76 kg	Gold	2018 - Caorle-Venice (ITA)
Men's Junior kumite -76 kg	Bronze	2018 - Umag (CRO)

== State awards ==
- Order of Merit (Ukraine) of the III century. (September 7, 2023) — For achieving high sports results at the 3rd European Games in Kraków (Republic of Poland), self-sacrifice and the will to win, raising Ukraine's international authority, were shown.
