= 2023 World Karate Championships – Men's 75 kg =

Men's Karate competition 2023

Men's kumite 75 kg at the 2023 World Karate Championships
- Venue: László Papp Budapest Sports Arena
- Location: Budapest, Hungary
- Dates: 25, 28 October
- Competitors: 74 from 74 nations

Medalists
gold medal	Abdalla Abdelaziz	Egypt
silver medal	Gábor Hárspataki	Hungary
bronze medal	Ernest Sharafutdinov
bronze medal	Andrii Zaplitnyi	Ukraine

The men's kumite 75 kg competition at the 2023 World Karate Championships was held on 25 and 28 October 2023.

== Results ==
=== Finals ===
Semifinals
(Hungary) Gábor Hárspataki	3
(Bosnia and Herzegovina) Hamza Turulja	0
(Ukraine) Andrii Zaplitnyi	0
(Egypt) Abdalla Abdelaziz	10

Final
(Hungary) Gábor Hárspataki	2
(Egypt) Abdalla Abdelaziz	3

=== Repechage ===
Repechage 1
(Kosovo) Elhami Shabani	0
(France) Enzo Berthon	5

Repechage 2
(France) Enzo Berthon	6
(Uzbekistan) Kuvonchbek Mukhammadiyev	1

Repechage 3
(France) Enzo Berthon	8
(Italy) Lorenzo Pietromarchi	2

Repechage 4
(France) Enzo Berthon	4
Ernest Sharafutdinov	8

Bronze medal
Ernest Sharafutdinov	2
(Bosnia and Herzegovina) Hamza Turulja	0

Repechage 2
(Kuwait) Omar Al-Jenaei	10
(Peru) Juan Ríos	10

Repechage 3
(Peru) Juan Ríos	1
(Brazil) Marco dos Anjos	4

Repechage 4
(Brazil) Marco dos Anjos	3
(United States) Thomas Scott	3

Bronze medal
(United States) Thomas Scott	5
(Ukraine) Andrii Zaplitnyi	5

=== Top half ===
==== Section 1 ====
First round
(Kosovo) Elhami Shabani	5
(Hungary) Gábor Hárspataki	5
(Greece) Dimitrios Stolis	2
(Senegal) Abdourahmane Sene	3
(Germany) Philipp Walger	3
(Chad) Alarson Stallon	0

Second round
(Hungary) Gábor Hárspataki	4
(France) Enzo Berthon	1
(Uzbekistan) Kuvonchbek Mukhammadiyev	6
(Lithuania) Tomas Balčius	1
(Senegal) Abdourahmane Sene	4
(Slovakia) Maroš Janovčík	1
(Costa Rica) Dylon Herrera	0
(Italy) Lorenzo Pietromarchi	8
(Germany) Philipp Walger	0
(Armenia) Gor Nersisyan	3
(Croatia) Ivan Martinac	1
(Albania) Bekim Basha	1
(Georgia (country)) Valiko Poniava	3
(Uruguay) Francisco Barrios	0
Ernest Sharafutdinov	11
(Kazakhstan) Nurkanat Azhikanov	4

Third round
(Hungary) Gábor Hárspataki	7
(Uzbekistan) Kuvonchbek Mukhammadiyev	1
(Senegal) Abdourahmane Sene	0
(Italy) Lorenzo Pietromarchi	8
(Armenia) Gor Nersisyan	0
(Croatia) Ivan Martinac	2
(Georgia (country)) Valiko Poniava	1
Ernest Sharafutdinov	4

Fourth round
(Hungary) Gábor Hárspataki	2
(Italy) Lorenzo Pietromarchi	1
(Croatia) Ivan Martinac	1
Ernest Sharafutdinov	8

Quarterfinals
(Hungary) Gábor Hárspataki	3
Ernest Sharafutdinov	0

==== Section 2 ====
First round
(Algeria) Oussama Zaid	0
(Bosnia and Herzegovina) Hamza Turulja	0
(South Korea) Pi Jae-yoon	1
(Colombia) Sergio Rodríguez	0

Second round
(Bosnia and Herzegovina) Hamza Turulja	1
(Chinese Taipei) Tong Yu-cheng	0
(Kenya) Fredrick Abubakar	0
(South Africa) Tyrone Carson Gray	0
(Latvia) Radijs Kostiļevs	1
(Morocco) Oussama Fahssi	7
(Bulgaria) Aleksandar Stefanov	3
(Turkey) Enes Bulut	8
(South Korea) Pi Jae-yoon	2
(Switzerland) Salim Tawfik	0
(Turkmenistan) Dawut Nazmyradow	9
(Montenegro) Emre Saljiu	1
(India) Pranay Sharma	2
(Japan) Yusei Sakiyama	4
(Spain) Alberto Delestal	0
(Belgium) Quentin Mahauden	8

Third round
(Bosnia and Herzegovina) Hamza Turulja	6
(Kenya) Fredrick Abubakar	0
(Morocco) Oussama Fahssi	1
(Turkey) Enes Bulut	0
(South Korea) Pi Jae-yoon	3
(Turkmenistan) Dawut Nazmyradow	0
(Japan) Yusei Sakiyama	8
(Belgium) Quentin Mahauden	0

Fourth round
(Bosnia and Herzegovina) Hamza Turulja	6
(Morocco) Oussama Fahssi	3
(South Korea) Pi Jae-yoon	8
(Japan) Yusei Sakiyama	6

Quarterfinals
(Bosnia and Herzegovina) Hamza Turulja	3
(South Korea) Pi Jae-yoon	1

=== Bottom half ===
==== Section 3 ====
First round
(Republic of Ireland) Dean O'Mahony	2
(England) Brandon Wilkins	4
(Luxembourg) Adil Haidar	0
(Czech Republic) Dominik Kočandrle	0
(Denmark) Christoffer Nielsen	3
(Slovenia) Jaka Gaal	1

Second round
(England) Brandon Wilkins	5
(Scotland) Ben Woods	2
(Iran) Saman Edalati	5
(Mexico) José Ávila	3
(Czech Republic) Dominik Kočandrle	2
(Chile) Joaquín González	5
(Australia) Mitchell Durham	0
(Ukraine) Andrii Zaplitnyi	6
(Denmark) Christoffer Nielsen	0
(Canada) Nicholas Rivest	1
(North Macedonia) Mursel Misini	2
(Azerbaijan) Farid Aghayev	3
(Curaçao) Gerson Wattilete	10
(Hong Kong) Yuen Yat Hin	2
(Austria) Stefan Pokorny	6
(Jordan) Hasan Masarweh	2

Third round
(England) Brandon Wilkins	8
(Iran) Saman Edalati	2
(Chile) Joaquín González	3
(Ukraine) Andrii Zaplitnyi	4
(Canada) Nicholas Rivest	7
(Azerbaijan) Farid Aghayev	6
(Curaçao) Gerson Wattilete	1
(Austria) Stefan Pokorny	3

Fourth round
(England) Brandon Wilkins	1
(Ukraine) Andrii Zaplitnyi	3
(Canada) Nicholas Rivest	0
(Austria) Stefan Pokorny	4

Quarterfinals
(Ukraine) Andrii Zaplitnyi	3
(Austria) Stefan Pokorny	0

==== Section 4 ====
First round
Hamoon Derafshipour	6
(Netherlands) Sebastiaan van Teeffelen	4
(Brazil) Marco dos Anjos	2
(Philippines) Alwyn Batican	1

Second round
Hamoon Derafshipour	5
(Venezuela) Juan Cubero	3
(Libya) Mohamed Abudabous	0
(Sweden) Ricky Haag	0
(Cyprus) Panayiotis Loizides	0
(Serbia) Đorđe Salapura	7
(Indonesia) Ignatius Joshua Kandou	1
(United States) Thomas Scott	1
(Brazil) Marco dos Anjos	8
(Romania) Leonard Moise	1
Devid Nhuyen	3
(Portugal) Tiago Duarte	0
(Estonia) Ragnar Audse	1
(Peru) Juan Ríos	2
(Kuwait) Omar Al-Jenaei	2
(Egypt) Abdalla Abdelaziz	6

Third round
Hamoon Derafshipour	5
(Libya) Mohamed Abudabous	3
(Serbia) Đorđe Salapura	1
(United States) Thomas Scott	4
(Brazil) Marco dos Anjos	4
Devid Nhuyen	0
(Peru) Juan Ríos	5
(Egypt) Abdalla Abdelaziz	7

Fourth round
Hamoon Derafshipour	0
(United States) Thomas Scott	3
(Brazil) Marco dos Anjos	4
(Egypt) Abdalla Abdelaziz	5

Quarterfinals
(United States) Thomas Scott	2
(Egypt) Abdalla Abdelaziz	8
