= 2025 World Karate Championships – Men's 75 kg =

Men's kumite 75 kg at the 2025 World Karate Championships
- Venue: Cairo Stadium Indoor Halls Complex
- Location: Cairo, Egypt
- Dates: 27–30 November
- Competitors: 31

Medalists
gold medal	Abdalla Abdelaziz	Egypt
silver medal	Andrii Zaplitnyi	Ukraine
bronze medal	Ernest Sharafutdinov
bronze medal	Suren Harutyunyan	Armenia

The men's kumite 75 kg competition at the 2025 World Karate Championships was held from 27 to 30 November 2025.

== Results ==
=== Group phase ===
==== Group A ====
Pos	Athlete	B	W	D	D^{0}	L	Pts	Score	(Ukraine)	(Portugal)	(Angola)	(New Zealand)
1	Andrii Zaplitnyi (UKR)	3	3	0	0	0	9	10–5	—	3–0	4–3	3–2
2	Tiago Duarte (POR)	3	2	0	0	1	6	10–8	0–3	—	6–5	4–0
3	Nario Lopes (ANG)	3	1	0	0	2	3	13–11	3–4	5–6	—	5–1
4	Logan Somerville (NZL)	3	0	0	0	3	0	3–12	2–3	0–4	1–5	—

==== Group B ====
Pos	Athlete	B	W	D	D^{0}	L	Pts	Score	(France)	(Algeria)	(Kosovo)	
1	Enzo Berthon (FRA) [3]	3	2	0	0	1	6 (Note: Berthon (FRA) 2–0 Zaid (ALG))	12–6	—	2–0	3–4	7–2
2	Oussama Zaid (ALG)	3	2	0	0	1	6	5–5	0–2	—	1–0	4–3
3	Betim Maliqi (KOS)	0	1	0	1	1	3	4–4	4–3	0–1	—	0–0
4	Devid Nhuyen (WKF-2)	0	0	0	1	2	0	5–11	2–7	3–4	0–0	—

==== Group C ====
Pos	Athlete	B	W	D	D^{0}	L	Pts	Score		(Armenia)	(Uzbekistan)	(Mexico)
1	Ernest Sharafutdinov (WKF-1)	3	3	0	0	0	9	13–4	—	5–0	3–2	5–2
2	Suren Harutyunyan (ARM)	3	2	0	0	1	6	10–12	0–5	—	4–2	6–5
3	Kuvonchbek Mukhammadiyev (UZB)	3	1	0	0	2	3	11–8	2–3	2–4	—	7–1
4	Carlos Villarreal (MEX)	3	0	0	0	3	0	8–18	2–5	5–6	1–7	—

==== Group D ====
Pos	Athlete	B	W	D	D^{0}	L	Pts	Score	(Kazakhstan)	(Iran)	(Belgium)	(Tunisia)
1	Nurkanat Azhikanov (KAZ) [2]	3	3	0	0	0	9	7–1	—	2–1	1–0	4–0
2	Morteza Nemati (IRI)	3	2	0	0	1	6	10–3	1–2	—	8–1	1–0
3	Quentin Mahauden (BEL)	3	1	0	0	2	3	11–15	0–1	1–8	—	10–6
4	Ahmed Rayane Tlili (TUN)	3	0	0	0	3	0	6–15	0–4	0–1	6–10	—

==== Group E ====
Pos	Athlete	B	W	D	D^{0}	L	Pts	Score	(Morocco)	(Greece)	(Jordan)	(Australia)
1	Hamza Sam (MAR)	3	2	0	0	1	6 (Note: Sam (MAR) 3–2 Zygouris (GRE))	14–14	—	3–2	6–5	5–7
2	Konstantinos Zygouris (GRE)	3	2	0	0	1	6	13–7	2–3	—	4–0	7–4
3	Saeed Al-Najjar (JOR)	3	1	0	0	2	3 (Note: Al-Najjar (JOR) 4–4 Durham (AUS))	9–14	5–6	0–4	—	4–4
4	Mitchell Durham (AUS)	3	1	0	0	2	3	15–16	7–5	4–7	4–4	—

==== Group F ====
Pos	Athlete	B	W	D	D^{0}	L	Pts	Score	(Turkey)	(Saudi Arabia)	(Hungary)	(Chile)
1	Ömer Faruk Yürür (TUR) [4]	3	2	0	0	1	6 (Note: Yürür (TUR) 1–1, Al-Zahrani (KSA) 1–1, Hárspataki (HUN) 1–1. Scores obtained: Yürür 7, Al-Zahrani 7, Hárspataki 5. Yürür 3–1 Al-Zahrani.)	7–2	—	3–1	0–1	4–0
2	Sultan Al-Zahrani (KSA)	3	2	0	0	1	6	7–4	1–3	—	3–0	3–1
3	Gábor Hárspataki (HUN)	3	2	0	0	1	6	5–6	1–0	0–3	—	4–3
4	Matías Rodríguez (CHI)	3	0	0	0	3	0	4–11	0–4	1–3	3–4	—

==== Group G ====
Pos	Athlete	B	W	D	D^{0}	L	Pts	Score	(United States)	(Japan)	(Libya)	(Netherlands)
1	Thomas Scott (USA)	3	2	0	0	1	6 (Note: Scott (USA) 3–2 Sakiyama (JPN))	5–6	—	3–2	1–0	1–4
2	Yusei Sakiyama (JPN)	3	2	0	0	1	6	9–7	2–3	—	4–3	3–1
3	Mohamed Abudabous (LBA)	3	1	0	0	2	3 (Note: Abudabous (LBA) 2–0 Franken (NED))	5–5	0–1	3–4	—	2–0
4	Ricardo Franken (NED)	3	1	0	0	2	3	5–6	4–1	1–3	0–2	—

==== Group F ====
Pos	Athlete	B	W	D	D^{0}	L	Pts	Score	(Egypt)	(Italy)	(Montenegro)
1	Abdalla Abdelaziz (EGY) [1]	2	1	1	0	0	4	10–4	—	1–1	9–3
2	Daniele De Vivo (ITA)	2	0	1	1	0	1	1–1	1–1	—	0–0
3	Nemanja Mikulić (MNE)	2	0	0	1	1	0	3–9	3–9	0–0	—

=== Elimination phase ===
Round of 16; 27 November
Daniele De Vivo (ITA)	1
Andrii Zaplitnyi (UKR)	2
Yusei Sakiyama (JPN)	0
Enzo Berthon (FRA)	6
Sultan Al-Zahrani (KSA)	1
Ernest Sharafutdinov (WKF-1)	4
Konstantinos Zygouris (GRE)	0
Nurkanat Azhikanov (KAZ)	0
Morteza Nemati (IRI)	2
Hamza Sam (MAR)	6
Suren Harutyunyan (ARM)	2
Ömer Faruk Yürür (TUR)	0
Oussama Zaid (ALG)	2
Thomas Scott (USA)	3
Tiago Duarte (POR)	0
Abdalla Abdelaziz (EGY)	8

Quarterfinals; 29 November
Andrii Zaplitnyi (UKR)	4
Enzo Berthon (FRA)	1
Ernest Sharafutdinov (WKF-1)	11
Nurkanat Azhikanov (KAZ)	3
Hamza Sam (MAR)	1
Suren Harutyunyan (ARM)	6
Thomas Scott (USA)	4
Abdalla Abdelaziz (EGY)	6

Semifinals; 29 November
Andrii Zaplitnyi (UKR)	6
Ernest Sharafutdinov (WKF-1)	3
Suren Harutyunyan (ARM)	2
Abdalla Abdelaziz (EGY)	4

Final; 30 November
Andrii Zaplitnyi (UKR)	0
Abdalla Abdelaziz (EGY)	6

Bronze medals 30 November
Enzo Berthon (FRA)	6
Ernest Sharafutdinov (WKF-1)	11
Thomas Scott (USA)	0
Suren Harutyunyan (ARM)	2
