= 2026 European Karate Championships – Men's 75 kg =

Men's 75 kg at the 2026 European Karate Championships
- Venue: Eissporthalle Frankfurt
- Location: Frankfurt, Germany
- Dates: 20, 23 May
- Competitors: 40 from 40 nations

Medalists
gold medal	Ömer Faruk Yürür	Turkey
silver medal	Kilian Cizo	France
bronze medal	Andrii Zaplitnyi	Ukraine
bronze medal	Ernest Sharafutdinov

The men's 75 kg competition at the 2026 European Karate Championships was held on 20 and 23 May 2026.

== Results ==
=== Finals ===
Semifinals
(France) Kilian Cizo	3
(Belgium) Quentin Mahauden	0
(Turkey) Ömer Faruk Yürür	4
(Ukraine) Andrii Zaplitnyi	0

Final
(France) Kilian Cizo	0
(Turkey) Ömer Faruk Yürür	6

=== Repechage ===
Repechage 1
(Netherlands) Ricardo Franken	4
(Armenia) Suren Harutyunyan	4

Repechage 2
(Netherlands) Ricardo Franken	0
(Croatia) Ivan Terihaj	1

Bronze medal
(Croatia) Ivan Terihaj	0
(Ukraine) Andrii Zaplitnyi	8

Repechage 1
(Serbia) Aleksandar Topuzović	10
(Azerbaijan) Rashid Suleymanov	12

Repechage 2
(Azerbaijan) Rashid Suleymanov	2
(Spain) Izan Martín	1

Repechage 3
(Azerbaijan) Rashid Suleymanov	1
Ernest Sharafutdinov	8

Bronze medal
Ernest Sharafutdinov	14
(Belgium) Quentin Mahauden	10

=== Top half ===
==== Section 1 ====
Round of 64
(France) Kilian Cizo	6
(Serbia) Aleksandar Topuzović	1
(Cyprus) Iwannis Kyriakou	0
(Kosovo) Betim Maliqi	5

Round of 32
(France) Kilian Cizo	4
(Azerbaijan) Rashid Suleymanov	3
(Spain) Izan Martín	6
(Albania) Bekim Basha	3
(Kosovo) Betim Maliqi	6
(Slovenia) Jaka Gaal	3
(Portugal) Tiago Duarte	2
Ernest Sharafutdinov	7

Round of 16
(France) Kilian Cizo	3
(Spain) Izan Martín	2
(Kosovo) Betim Maliqi	0
Ernest Sharafutdinov	0

Quarterfinals
(France) Kilian Cizo	10
Ernest Sharafutdinov	9

==== Section 2 ====
Round of 64
(Germany) Tim Steiner	3
(Bulgaria) Nikolay Tsanev	3
(Republic of Ireland) Dean O'Mahony	6
(Georgia (country)) Valiko Poniava	6

Round of 32
(Bulgaria) Nikolay Tsanev	0
(Finland) Tuomas Suur-Inkeroinen	1
(Luxembourg) Mahmoud Almalh	6
(Switzerland) Nico Sparer	7
(Republic of Ireland) Dean O'Mahony	9
Farzad Rostami	1
Mikita Dubina	0
(Belgium) Quentin Mahauden	8

Round of 16
(Finland) Tuomas Suur-Inkeroinen	4
(Switzerland) Nico Sparer	8
(Republic of Ireland) Dean O'Mahony	0
(Belgium) Quentin Mahauden	8

Quarterfinals
(Switzerland) Nico Sparer	0
(Belgium) Quentin Mahauden	5

=== Bottom half ===
==== Section 3 ====
Round of 64
(England) Brandon Wilkins	5
(Montenegro) Lazar Jovović	3
(Armenia) Suren Harutyunyan	3
(Denmark) August Von Platen	2

Round of 32
(England) Brandon Wilkins	1
(Croatia) Ivan Terihaj	3
(Scotland) Benjamin Packwood	0
(Lithuania) Tomas Balčius	0
(Armenia) Suren Harutyunyan	6
(Latvia) Aleksandrs Obernihins	2
(Netherlands) Ricardo Franken	1
(Turkey) Ömer Faruk Yürür	3

Round of 16
(Croatia) Ivan Terihaj	4
(Lithuania) Tomas Balčius	0
(Armenia) Suren Harutyunyan	5
(Turkey) Ömer Faruk Yürür	7

Quarterfinals
(Croatia) Ivan Terihaj	3
(Turkey) Ömer Faruk Yürür	6

==== Section 4 ====
Round of 64
(North Macedonia) Ljupche Mihajlov	5
(Poland) Brajan Rochalski	2
(Hungary) Máté Tóth	8
(Romania) Patrick Budan-Pîrvu	3

Round of 32
(North Macedonia) Ljupche Mihajlov	0
(Austria) Mykyta Hrihorashenko	3
(Slovakia) Martin Čiaky	6
(Greece) Evangelos Seremetakis	1
(Hungary) Máté Tóth	1
(Bosnia and Herzegovina) Sanjin Hukara	2
(Italy) Daniele De Vivo	0
(Ukraine) Andrii Zaplitnyi	1

Round of 16
(Austria) Mykyta Hrihorashenko	1
(Slovakia) Martin Čiaky	6
(Bosnia and Herzegovina) Sanjin Hukara	0
(Ukraine) Andrii Zaplitnyi	3

Quarterfinals
(Slovakia) Martin Čiaky	0
(Ukraine) Andrii Zaplitnyi	2
