= Karate at the 2020 Summer Olympics – Men's 75 kg =

Karate competition

Men's kumite 75 kg at the Games of the XXXII Olympiad
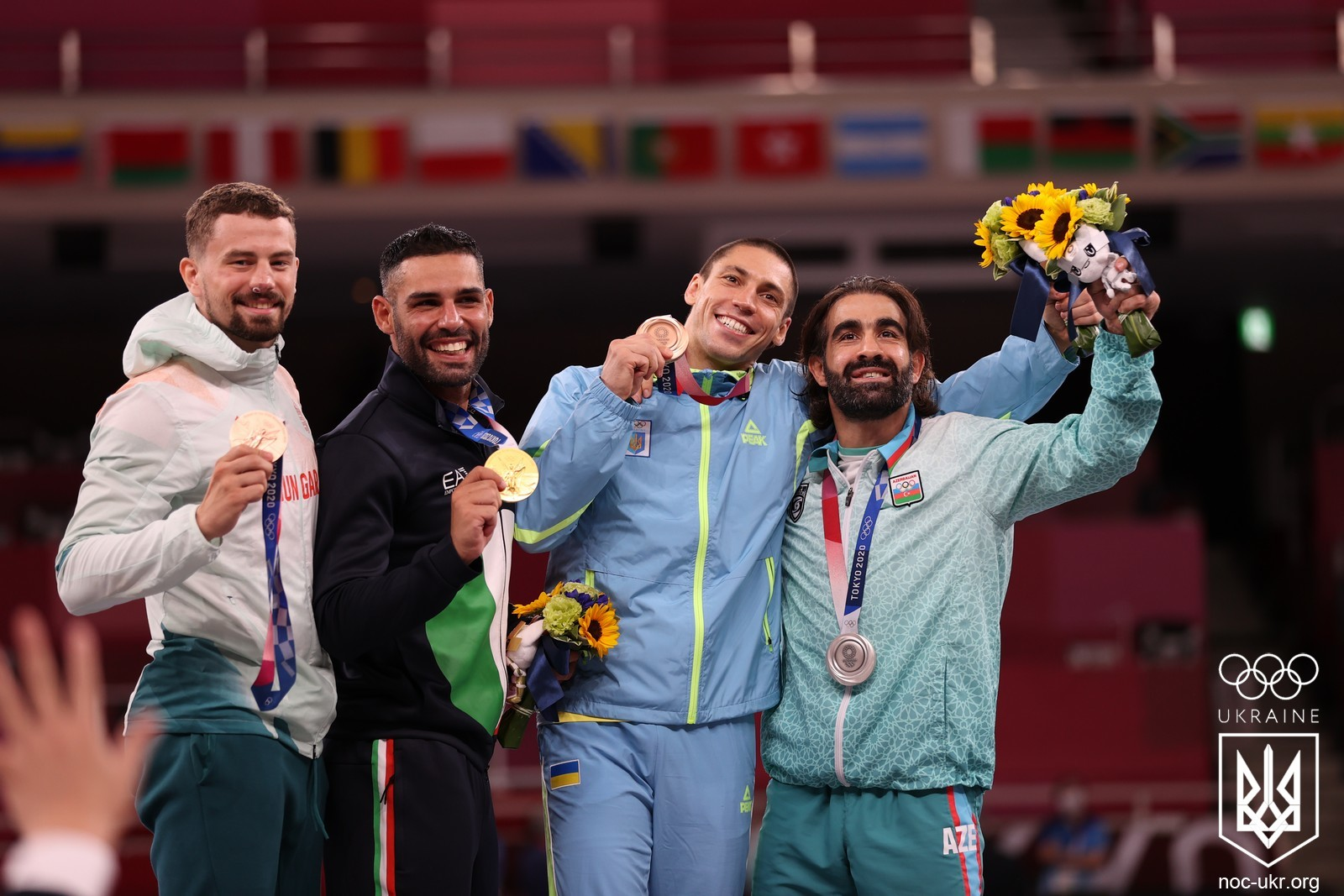
- Venue: Nippon Budokan
- Date: 6 August 2021
- Competitors: 10 from 10 nations

Medalists
1st place, gold medalist(s)		Luigi Busà	Italy
2nd place, silver medalist(s)		Rafael Aghayev	Azerbaijan
3rd place, bronze medalist(s)		Gábor Hárspataki	Hungary
3rd place, bronze medalist(s)		Stanislav Horuna	Ukraine

The men's kumite 75 kg competition in Karate at the 2020 Summer Olympics was held on 6 August 2021 at the Nippon Budokan.

== Competition format ==
The competition began with a two-pool round-robin stage followed by a single elimination stage. Each pool consisted of five athletes, with those positioned 1st and 4th seeded to Pool A, and those positioned 2nd and 3rd to Pool B. The athlete that finished first in Pool A will face the athlete that finished second in Pool B in the semifinals, and vice versa. There were no bronze medal matches in the kumite events. Losers of the semifinals each received a bronze medal.

== Schedule ==
All times are in local time (UTC+9).

Date	Time	Round
Friday, 6 August 2021	17:00; 20:22; 20:50; 21:00	Pool stage Semifinals; Gold medal match Victory ceremony

== Results ==
=== Pool stage ===
Pool A

Athlete	Pld	W	D	L	Pts	Qualification
Gábor Hárspataki (HUN)	4	2	1	1	5	Semifinals
Stanislav Horuna (UKR)	4	2	1	1	5	Semifinals
Ken Nishimura (JPN)	4	2	0	2	4	
Thomas Scott (USA)	4	2	0	2	4	
Abdalla Abdelaziz (EGY)	4	1	0	3	2	

Pool B

Athlete	Pld	W	D	L	Pts	Qualification
Luigi Busà (ITA)	4	3	0	1	6	Semifinals
Rafael Aghayev (AZE)	4	3	0	1	6	Semifinals
Noah Bitsch (GER)	4	2	0	2	4	
Nurkanat Azhikanov (KAZ)	4	2	0	2	4	
Tsuneari Yahiro (AUS)	4	0	0	4	0	

=== Finals ===
Semifinals
A1 Gábor Hárspataki (HUN) (bronze)	0
B2 Rafael Aghayev (AZE)	7
B1 Luigi Busà (ITA)	3
A2 Stanislav Horuna (UKR) (bronze)	0

Gold medal
B2 Rafael Aghayev (AZE) (silver)	0
B1 Luigi Busà (ITA) (gold)	1
