= Karate at the 2015 European Games – Men's kumite 75 kg =

Karate competition

Men's kumite 75 kg at the 2015 European Games
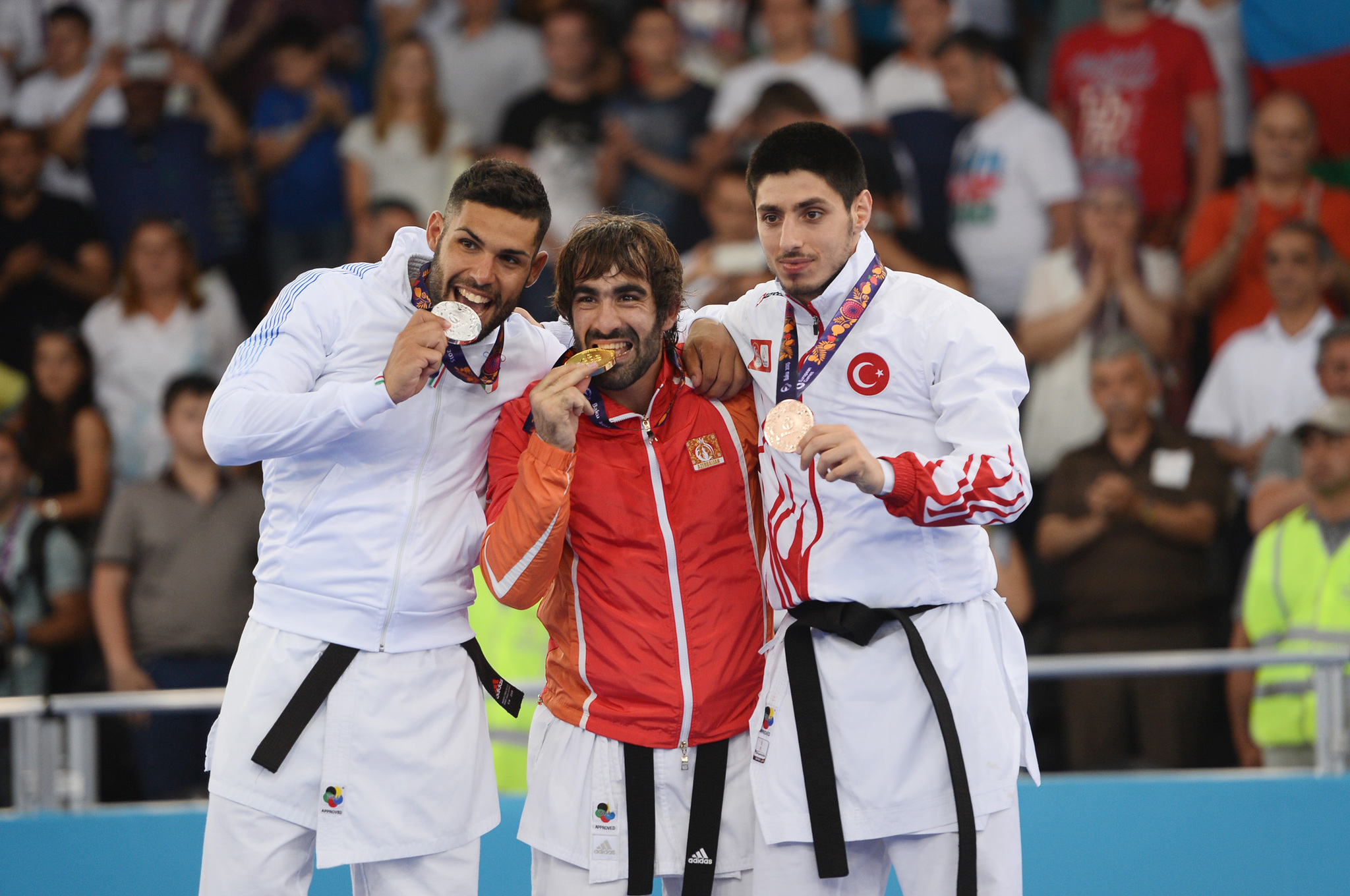
- The medal ceremony.
- Venue: Baku Crystal Hall
- Date: 13 June
- Competitors: 8 from 8 nations

Medalists
gold medal	Rafael Aghayev	Azerbaijan
silver medal	Luigi Busà	Italy
bronze medal	Erman Eltemur	Turkey

The men's kumite 75 kg competition at the 2015 European Games in Baku, Azerbaijan was held on 13 June 2015 at the Crystal Hall.

== Schedule ==
All times are Azerbaijan Summer Time (UTC+5).

Date	Time	Event
Saturday, 13 June 2015	11:00	Elimination Round
Saturday, 13 June 2015	16:00	Semifinals
Saturday, 13 June 2015	18:00	Finals

== Results ==
Legend

- KK — Forfeit (Kiken)

=== Elimination round ===
==== Group A ====
Athlete	Pld	W	D	L	Points		
Athlete	Pld	W	D	L	GF	GA	Diff
Erman Eltemur (TUR)	3	3	0	0	10	3	+7
Rafael Aghayev (AZE)	3	2	0	1	9	6	+3
Ruslans Sadikovs (LAT)	3	0	1	2	2	5	-3
Illya Nikulin (UKR)	3	0	1	2	1	8	-7

	Score	
Rafael Aghayev (AZE)	3–0	Illya Nikulin (UKR)
Ruslans Sadikovs (LAT)	0–1	Erman Eltemur (TUR)
Rafael Aghayev (AZE)	3–5	Erman Eltemur (TUR)
Ruslans Sadikovs (LAT)	1–1	Illya Nikulin (UKR)
Illya Nikulin (UKR)	0–4	Erman Eltemur (TUR)
Rafael Aghayev (AZE)	3–1	Ruslans Sadikovs (LAT)

==== Group B ====
Athlete	Pld	W	D	L	Points		
Athlete	Pld	W	D	L	GF	GA	Diff
Noah Bitsch (GER)	3	2	1	0	5	1	+4
Luigi Busà (ITA)	3	2	0	1	3	2	+1
Logan Da Costa (FRA)	3	1	1	1	9	3	+6
Panayiotis Loizides (CYP)	3	0	0	3	2	13	–11

	Score	
Noah Bitsch (GER)	0–0	Logan Da Costa (FRA)
Luigi Busà (FRA)	1–0	Panayiotis Loizides (CYP)
Noah Bitsch (GER)	3–1	Panayiotis Loizides (CYP)
Luigi Busà (ITA)	2–0	Logan Da Costa (FRA)
Logan Da Costa (FRA)	9–1	Panayiotis Loizides (CYP)
Noah Bitsch (GER)	2–0	Luigi Busà (ITA)

=== Finals ===
Semifinals
Erman Eltemur (TUR)	4
Luigi Busà (ITA)	4
Rafael Aghayev (AZE)	1
Noah Bitsch (GER)	0

Gold medal match
Luigi Busà (ITA)	0
Rafael Aghayev (AZE)	1
Bronze medal match
Erman Eltemur (TUR)	5
Noah Bitsch (GER)	0
