= Karate at the 2023 European Games – Men's kumite 75 kg =

Men's kumite 75 kg at the 2023 European Games
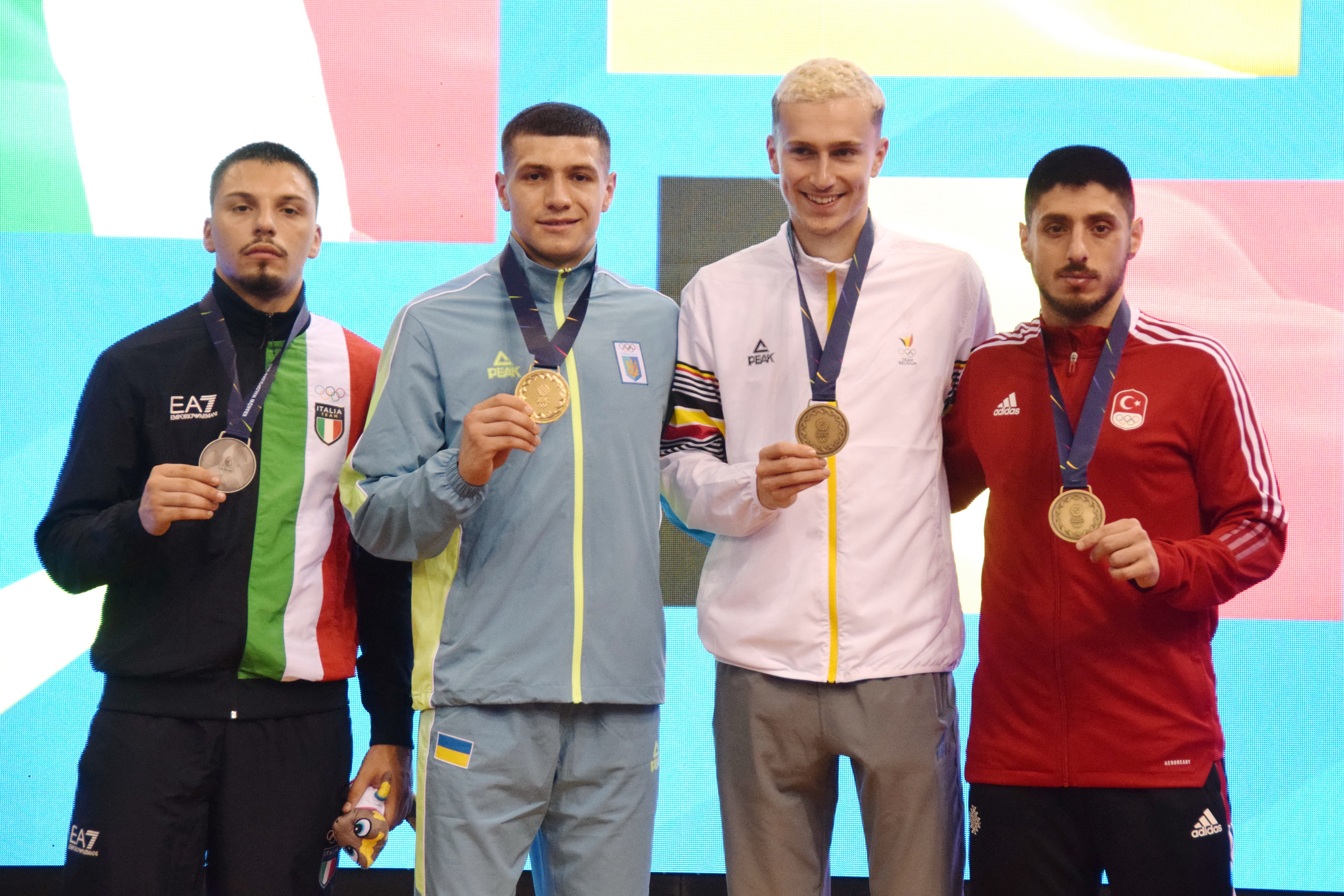
- Venue: Bielsko-Biała Arena
- Date: 23 June
- Competitors: 8 from 8 nations

Medalists
| gold medal | Andrii Zaplitnyi | Ukraine |
| silver medal | Daniele De Vivo | Italy |
| bronze medal | Erman Eltemur | Turkey |
| bronze medal | Quentin Mahauden | Belgium |

The men's kumite 75 kg competition at the 2023 European Games was held on 23 June 2023 at the Bielsko-Biała Arena.

== Results ==
=== Elimination round ===
Pool A

| Pos | Athlete | B | W | D | D^{0} | L | Pts | Score | (Turkey) | (Belgium) | (United Kingdom) | (Poland) |
|---|---|---|---|---|---|---|---|---|---|---|---|---|
| 1 | Erman Eltemur (TUR) | 3 | 3 | 0 | 0 | 0 | 9 | 18–17 | — | 10–5 | 5–2 | 3–0 |
| 2 | Quentin Mahauden (BEL) | 3 | 2 | 0 | 0 | 1 | 6 | 18–13 | 5–10 | — | 6–3 | 7–0 |
| 3 | Brandon Wilkins (GBR) | 3 | 1 | 0 | 0 | 2 | 3 | 12–13 | 2–5 | 3–6 | — | 7–2 |
| 4 | Maciej Drążewski (POL) | 3 | 0 | 0 | 0 | 3 | 0 | 2–17 | 0–3 | 0–7 | 2–7 | — |

Source: EG2023

Pool B

| Pos | Athlete | B | W | D | D^{0} | L | Pts | Score | (Ukraine) | (Italy) | (Azerbaijan) | (Portugal) |
|---|---|---|---|---|---|---|---|---|---|---|---|---|
| 1 | Andrii Zaplitnyi (UKR) | 3 | 3 | 0 | 0 | 0 | 9 | 7–1 | — | 3–0 | 2–1 | 2–0 |
| 2 | Daniele De Vivo (ITA) | 3 | 2 | 0 | 0 | 1 | 6 | 10–5 | 0–3 | — | 5–2 | 5–0 |
| 3 | Farid Aghayev (AZE) | 3 | 0 | 0 | 1 | 2 | 0 (Note: Aghayev (AZE) 0–0 Duarte (POR). Scores obtained: Aghayev 3, Duarte 0.) | 3–7 | 1–2 | 2–5 | — | 0–0 |
| 4 | Tiago Duarte (POR) | 3 | 0 | 0 | 1 | 2 | 0 | 0–7 | 0–2 | 0–5 | 0–0 | — |

Source: EG2023

=== Finals ===
Semifinals
Daniele De Vivo (ITA) | 4
Erman Eltemur (TUR) | 3
Quentin Mahauden (BEL) | 4
Andrii Zaplitnyi (UKR) | 5

Gold medal bout
Daniele De Vivo (ITA) | 3
Andrii Zaplitnyi (UKR) | 3
