= Karate at the 2019 European Games – Men's kumite 75 kg =

Men's kumite 75 kg at the 2019 European Games
- Venue: Čyžoŭka-Arena
- Date: 30 June
- Competitors: 8 from 8 nations

Medalists
gold medal	Stanislav Horuna	Ukraine
silver medal	Rafael Aghayev	Azerbaijan
bronze medal	Gábor Hárspataki	Hungary
bronze medal	Pavel Artamonov	Estonia

The men's kumite 75 kg competition at the 2019 European Games in Minsk was held on 30 June 2019 at the Čyžoŭka-Arena.

== Schedule ==
All times are local (UTC+3).

Date	Time	Event
Sunday, 30 June 2019	12:00	Elimination round
Sunday, 30 June 2019	16:20	Semifinals
Sunday, 30 June 2019	17:48	Final

== Results ==
=== Elimination round ===
==== Group A ====
Rank	Athlete	B	W	D	L	Pts	Score
1	Stanislav Horuna (UKR)	3	2	0	1	4	10–6
2	Pavel Artamonov (EST)	3	1	1	1	3	6–6
3	Noah Bitsch (GER)	3	1	1	1	3	4–1
4	Ivan Korabau (BLR)	3	1	0	2	2	3–10

	Score	
Pavel Artamonov (EST)	3–6	Stanislav Horuna (UKR)
Ivan Korabau (BLR)	0–4	Noah Bitsch (GER)
Ivan Korabau (BLR)	3–3	Stanislav Horuna (UKR)
Pavel Artamonov (EST)	0–0	Noah Bitsch (GER)
Noah Bitsch (GER)	0–1	Stanislav Horuna (UKR)
Pavel Artamonov (EST)	3–0	Ivan Korabau (BLR)

==== Group B ====
Rank	Athlete	B	W	D	L	Pts	Score
1	Rafael Aghayev (AZE)	3	2	1	0	5	4–2
2	Gábor Hárspataki (HUN)	3	1	2	0	4	1–0
3	Erman Eltemur (TUR)	3	1	1	1	3	3–2
4	Joe Kellaway (GBR)	3	0	0	3	0	3–7

	Score	
Rafael Aghayev (AZE)	3–2	Joe Kellaway (GBR)
Gábor Hárspataki (HUN)	0–0	Erman Eltemur (TUR)
Gábor Hárspataki (HUN)	1–0	Joe Kellaway (GBR)
Rafael Aghayev (AZE)	1–0	Erman Eltemur (TUR)
Erman Eltemur (TUR)	3–1	Joe Kellaway (GBR)
Rafael Aghayev (AZE)	0–0	Gábor Hárspataki (HUN)

=== Finals ===
Semifinals
Stanislav Horuna (UKR)	3
Gábor Hárspataki (HUN)	2
Rafael Aghayev (AZE)	2
Pavel Artamonov (EST)	1

Final
Stanislav Horuna (UKR)	4
Rafael Aghayev (AZE)	0
