= Noah Bitsch =

German karateka (born 1989)

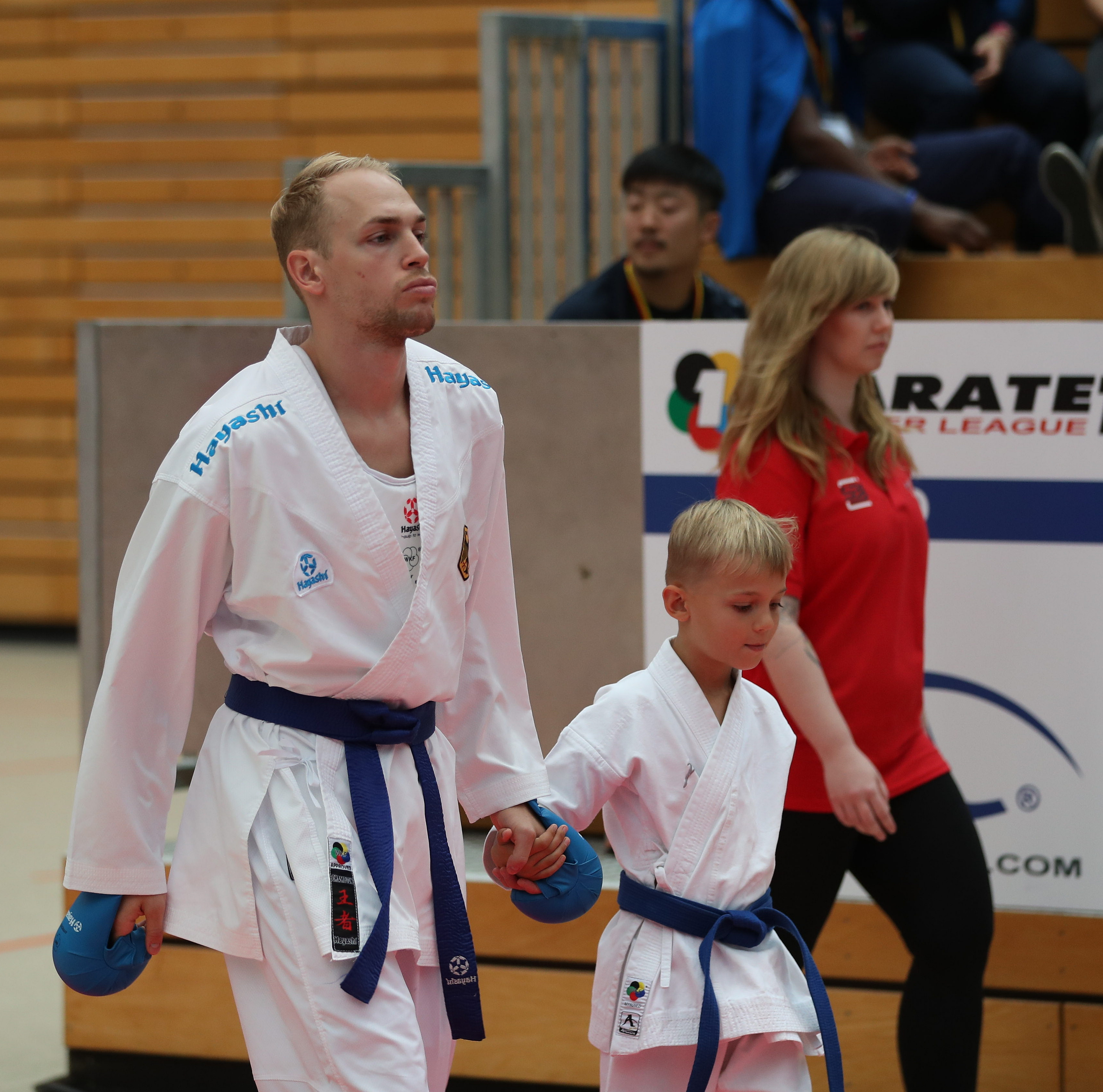
- Bitsch (left) in 2018

Personal information
- Born: 29 September 1989 (age 36)

Sport
- Country: Germany
- Sport: Karate
Medal record
Men's karate
Representing Germany
World Championships
Silver medal – second place	2014 Bremen	Team kumite
Bronze medal – third place	2014 Bremen	75 kg
Bronze medal – third place	2016 Linz	Team kumite
European Championships
Gold medal – first place	2012 Adeje	Team kumite
Silver medal – second place	2015 Istanbul	75 kg
Bronze medal – third place	2012 Adeje	75 kg
Bronze medal – third place	2013 Budapest	Team kumite
Bronze medal – third place	2014 Tampere	Team kumite
Bronze medal – third place	2016 Montpellier	84 kg
Bronze medal – third place	2021 Poreč	75 kg
World Games
Silver medal – second place	2013 Cali	75 kg

Noah Bitsch (born 29 September 1989) is a German karateka. He has won medals at both the World Karate Championships and European Karate Championships with his best individual result being bronze at the 2014 World Karate Championships and silver at the 2015 European Karate Championships. He has also won medals in the men's team kumite event at several editions of both competitions. In 2013, he also won the silver medal in his event at the 2013 World Games held in Cali, Colombia.

He represented Germany at the 2020 Summer Olympics in Tokyo, Japan. He competed in the men's 75 kg event where he did not advance to compete in the semifinals.

== Career ==
He won two medals at the 2012 European Karate Championships in Adeje, Spain: the gold medal in the men's team kumite event and one of the bronze medals in the men's kumite 75 kg event. He won one of the bronze medals in the men's team kumite event at both the 2013 European Karate Championships held in Budapest, Hungary and the 2014 European Karate Championships held in Tampere, Finland.

At the 2013 World Games held in Cali, Colombia, he won the silver medal in the men's kumite 75 kg event. In 2015, he lost his bronze medal match in the men's kumite 75 kg event at the 2015 European Games held in Baku, Azerbaijan. In 2019, he competed in the same event at the 2019 European Games held in Minsk, Belarus where he did not advance to compete in the semi-finals.

In May 2021, he won one of the bronze medals in the men's kumite 75 kg event at the 2021 European Karate Championships held in Poreč, Croatia. In June 2021, he qualified at the World Olympic Qualification Tournament held in Paris, France to compete at the 2020 Summer Olympics in Tokyo, Japan.

== Personal life ==
Karateka Mia Bitsch is his sister.

== Achievements ==
Year	Competition	Venue	Rank	Event
2012	European Championships	Adeje, Spain	1st	Team kumite
2012	European Championships	Adeje, Spain	3rd	Kumite 75 kg
2013	European Championships	Budapest, Hungary	3rd	Team kumite
2013	World Games	Cali, Colombia	2nd	Kumite 75 kg
2014	European Championships	Tampere, Finland	3rd	Team kumite
2014	World Championships	Bremen, Germany	2nd	Team kumite
2014	World Championships	Bremen, Germany	3rd	Kumite 75 kg
2015	European Championships	Istanbul, Turkey	2nd	Kumite 75 kg
2016	European Championships	Montpellier, France	3rd	Kumite 84 kg
2016	World Championships	Linz, Austria	3rd	Team kumite
2021	European Championships	Poreč, Croatia	3rd	Kumite 75 kg
