= 2019 European Junior Karate Championships =

Karate competition

- Location: (Danish Realm) Aalborg, Denmark
- Dates: 08–10 Feb
- Competitors: 1100 (total in all 3 events) from 51 nations

The 46th 2019 European Junior Karate Championships were the edition of the European Karate Championships, and were held in Aalborg, Denmark from 8 to 10 February 2019 along with the Karate Junior & U21 Championships and it was organized by Dansk Karate Forbund.

== Junior Kumite Male -55 KG ==
Luciano Carmine from Italy ranked first and won the gold medal in the Continental Championship with 930 points and a total of 5 matches won. Mikita Rashetnik from Belarus won the silver medal. Burak Ozdemir from Turkey and Victor Cuerva from Spain won bronze medals.

== Junior Kumite Male -61 KG ==
Aminagha Guliyev from Azerbaijan ranked first and won the gold medal in the Continental Championship with 990 points and a total of 6 matches won. Amar Youness Oualad from Belgium won the silver medal. Aleksandre Tkvatsiria from Georgia and Brahim El Beqqal from France won bronze medals.

== Junior Kumite Male -68 KG ==
Vladislav Taldykin from Russian Federation ranked first and won the gold medal in the Continental Championship with 990 points and a total of 6 matches won. Nguyen Hoang Ngan from Hungary won the silver medal. Yanis Lamotte from France and Daniele De Vivo from Italy won bronze medals.

== Junior Kumite Male -76 KG ==
Raybak Abdesselem from France ranked first and won the gold medal in the Continental Championship with 990 points and a total of 6 matches won. Ilias Hounifa from Belgium won the silver medal. Andrii Zaplitnyi from Ukraine and Hasan Arslan from Turkey won bronze medals.

== Junior Kumite Male +76 KG ==
Crean Christopher McCarthy from Ireland ranked first and won the gold medal in the Continental Championship with 990 points and a total of 6 matches won. Gligor Petkov from Macedonia won the silver medal. Tomas Kosa from Slovakia and Albert Baranov from Estonia won bronze medals.
