= 2014 European Karate Championships =

Karate competition

- Location: Tampere, Finland
- Dates: 1–4 May
- Competitors: 481 from 44 nations

The 2014 European Karate Championships, the 49th edition, was held at Tampere in Finland from 1 to 4 May 2014. A total of 481 competitors from 44 countries participated at the event.

== Medal table ==
* Host nation (Finland)

Rank	Nation	Gold	Silver	Bronze	Total
1	Italy	4	2	1	7
2	Turkey	3	3	3	9
3	Spain	2	2	3	7
4	Azerbaijan	1	2	1	4
5	Croatia	1	0	4	5
6	England	1	0	0	1
6	Greece	1	0	0	1
6	North Macedonia	1	0	0	1
6	Russia	1	0	0	1
6	Switzerland	1	0	0	1
11	France	0	1	6	7
12	Ukraine	0	1	3	4
13	Finland*	0	1	1	2
13	Serbia	0	1	1	2
15	Austria	0	1	0	1
15	Denmark	0	1	0	1
15	Luxembourg	0	1	0	1
18	Netherlands	0	0	3	3
19	Germany	0	0	2	2
20	Belarus	0	0	1	1
20	Bosnia and Herzegovina	0	0	1	1
20	Hungary	0	0	1	1
20	Montenegro	0	0	1	1
Totals (23 entries)		16	16	32	64

== Medalists ==
=== Men's competition ===
==== Individual ====
Event	Gold	Silver	Bronze
Kata	(Italy) Mattia Busato	(Spain) Damián Quintero	(France) Vu Duc Minh Dack (Turkey) Mehmet Yakan
Kumite –60 kg	(North Macedonia) Emil Pavlov	(Denmark) Casper Lidegaard	(Netherlands) Geoffrey Berens (Spain) Matías Gómez
Kumite –67 kg	(England) Jordan Thomas	(Azerbaijan) Niyazi Aliyev	(Hungary) Yves Martial Tadissi (Italy) Mauro Scognamiglio
Kumite –75 kg	(Italy) Luigi Busà	(Ukraine) Stanislav Horuna	(France) Davy Dona (Turkey) Serkan Yağcı
Kumite –84 kg	(Greece) Georgios Tzanos	(Turkey) Gökhan Gündüz	(Bosnia and Herzegovina) Meris Muhović (Netherlands) Timothy Petersen
Kumite +84 kg	(Turkey) Enes Erkan	(Azerbaijan) Shahin Atamov	(Serbia) Slobodan Bitević (Germany) Jonathan Horne

==== Team ====
Event	Gold	Silver	Bronze
Kata	Spain; José Carbonell; Damián Quintero; Francisco Salazar	Italy; Mattia Busato; Alessandro Iodice; Alfredo Tocco	Croatia; Ivan Ermenc; Franjo Maškarin; Damjan Padovan France; Vu Duc Minh Dack; William Geoffrey; Rémi Martorana
Kumite	Azerbaijan; Tural Aghalarzade; Niyazi Aliyev; Shahin Atamov; Asiman Gurbanli; Rafiz Hasanov; Aykhan Mamayev	Turkey; Uğur Aktaş; Enes Erkan; Erman Eltemur; Gökhan Gündüz; Rıdvan Kaptan; Ömer Kemaloğlu; Yaser Şahintekin	Netherlands; Geoffrey Berens; Lorenzo Manhoef; Timothy Petersen; Moreno Sheppard; René Smaal; Donovan Wold Germany; Andreas Bachmann; Noah Bitsch; Mehmet Bolat; Oliver Henning; Jonathan Horne; Heinrich Leistenschneider; Nikoloz Tsurtsumia

=== Women's competition ===
==== Individual ====
Event	Gold	Silver	Bronze
Kata	(Italy) Viviana Bottaro	(Spain) Yaiza Martín	(Turkey) Dilara Bozan (France) Sandy Scordo
Kumite –50 kg	(Turkey) Serap Özçelik	(Austria) Bettina Plank	(France) Sophia Bouderbane (Azerbaijan) Nurana Aliyeva
Kumite –55 kg	(Italy) Sara Cardin	(Luxembourg) Jennifer Warling	(France) Emilie Thouy (Ukraine) Zhanna Melnyk
Kumite –61 kg	(Croatia) Ana Lenard	(Serbia) Sanja Cvrkota	(Ukraine) Anita Serogina (Montenegro) Jelena Maksimović
Kumite –68 kg	(Russia) Inga Sheroziya	(Turkey) Merve Çoban	(Croatia) Ivona Tubić (Spain) Cristina Vizcaíno
Kumite +68 kg	(Switzerland) Fanny Clavien	(France) Nadège Ait-Ibrahim	(Spain) Laura Palacio (Finland) Helena Kuusisto

==== Team ====
Event	Gold	Silver	Bronze
Kata	Spain; Sonia García; Yaiza Martín; Margarita Morata	Italy; Sara Battaglia; Viviana Bottaro; Michela Pezzetti	Croatia; Marijana Kiuk; Vlatka Kiuk; Petra Krivičić Belarus; Aliaksandra Fursava; Maryia Fursava; Darya Rahautsova
Kumite	Turkey; Merve Çoban; Meltem Hocaoğlu; Serap Özçelik; Tuba Yakan	Finland; Ayse Abat; Emma Aronen; Helena Kuusisto; Henna Kuusisto	Ukraine; Zhanna Melnyk; Anita Serogina; Anzhelika Terliuga; Irina Zaretska Croatia; Ana-Marija Bujas Čelan; Ana Lenard; Azra Saleš; Ivona Tubić

== Participating countries ==
- Albania (3)
- Austria (11)
- Azerbaijan (11)
- Belarus (11)
- Belgium (8)
- Bosnia and Herzegovina (19)
- Bulgaria (4)
- Croatia (21)
- Cyprus (4)
- Czech Republic (7)
- Denmark (11)
- England (15)
- Estonia (4)
- Finland (16)
- France (23)
- Georgia (5)
- Germany (20)
- Greece (9)
- Hungary (15)
- Iceland (3)
- Ireland (11)
- Israel (7)
- Italy (19)
- Latvia (9)
- Luxembourg (2)
- Macedonia (17)
- Montenegro (7)
- Netherlands (8)
- Northern Ireland (1)
- Norway (3)
- Poland (2)
- Portugal (14)
- Romania (12)
- Russia (23)
- Scotland (4)
- Serbia (22)
- Slovakia (12)
- Slovenia (9)
- Spain (20)
- Sweden (11)
- Switzerland (12)
- Turkey (21)
- Ukraine (15)
- Wales (1)
