= 2021 European Junior Karate Championships =

European Junior Karate Championships

- Location: Tampere, Finland
- Dates: 20–22 Aug
- Competitors: 1021 from 45 nations

The 48th 2021 European Junior Karate Championships were the edition of the European Karate Championships, and were held in Tampere, Finland from 20 to 22 August 2021 along with the Karate Junior & U21 Championships. Raybak Abdesselem of France won the only gold medal by defeating Russian Andreev in U21 84 kg category. Hairiss Hierso of France won the only gold medal in 54 kg category. Turkey win highest gold medals in the event with 9 gold, 2 silver, and 6 bronze.
