= Luigi Busà =

Italian karateka (born 1987)

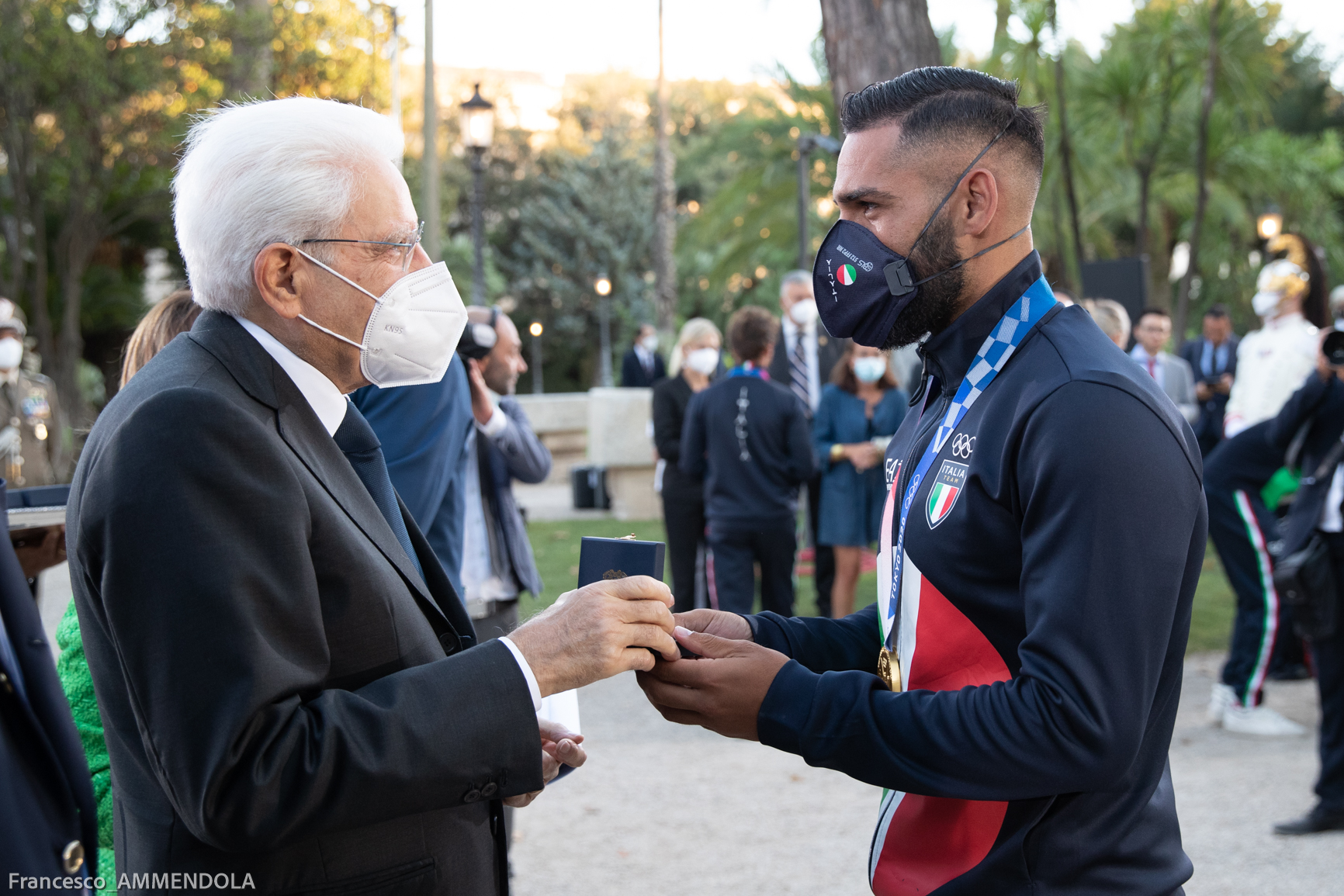
- Busà awarded by the Italian President Sergio Mattarella at Quirinale Palace in 2021.

Personal information
- Born: 9 October 1987 (age 38) Avola, Italy

Sport
- Country: Italy
- Sport: Karate
- Event: Kumite
Medal record
Men's karate
Representing Italy
Olympic Games
| Gold medal – first place | 2020 Tokyo | 75 kg |
World Championships
| Gold medal – first place | 2006 Tampere | 80 kg |
| Gold medal – first place | 2012 Paris | 75 kg |
| Silver medal – second place | 2010 Belgrade | 75 kg |
| Silver medal – second place | 2014 Bremen | 75 kg |
| Silver medal – second place | 2018 Madrid | 75 kg |
| Bronze medal – third place | 2016 Linz | 75 kg |
European Championships
| Gold medal – first place | 2007 Bratislava | 75 kg |
| Gold medal – first place | 2012 Adeje | 75 kg |
| Gold medal – first place | 2014 Tampere | 75 kg |
| Gold medal – first place | 2017 İzmit | 75 kg |
| Gold medal – first place | 2019 Guadalajara | 75 kg |
| Silver medal – second place | 2009 Zagreb | 75 kg |
| Silver medal – second place | 2011 Zürich | 75 kg |
| Bronze medal – third place | 2006 Stavanger | 80 kg |
| Bronze medal – third place | 2007 Bratislava | Team kumite |
| Bronze medal – third place | 2008 Tallinn | 75 kg |
| Bronze medal – third place | 2010 Athens | 75 kg |
| Bronze medal – third place | 2011 Zürich | Team kumite |
| Bronze medal – third place | 2013 Budapest | 75 kg |
| Bronze medal – third place | 2015 Istanbul | 75 kg |
| Bronze medal – third place | 2018 Novi Sad | 75 kg |
| Bronze medal – third place | 2022 Gaziantep | 75 kg |
European Games
| Silver medal – second place | 2015 Baku | 75 kg |
Mediterranean Games
| Silver medal – second place | 2009 Pescara | 75 kg |
| Bronze medal – third place | 2013 Mersin | 75 kg |
| Bronze medal – third place | 2022 Oran | 75 kg |

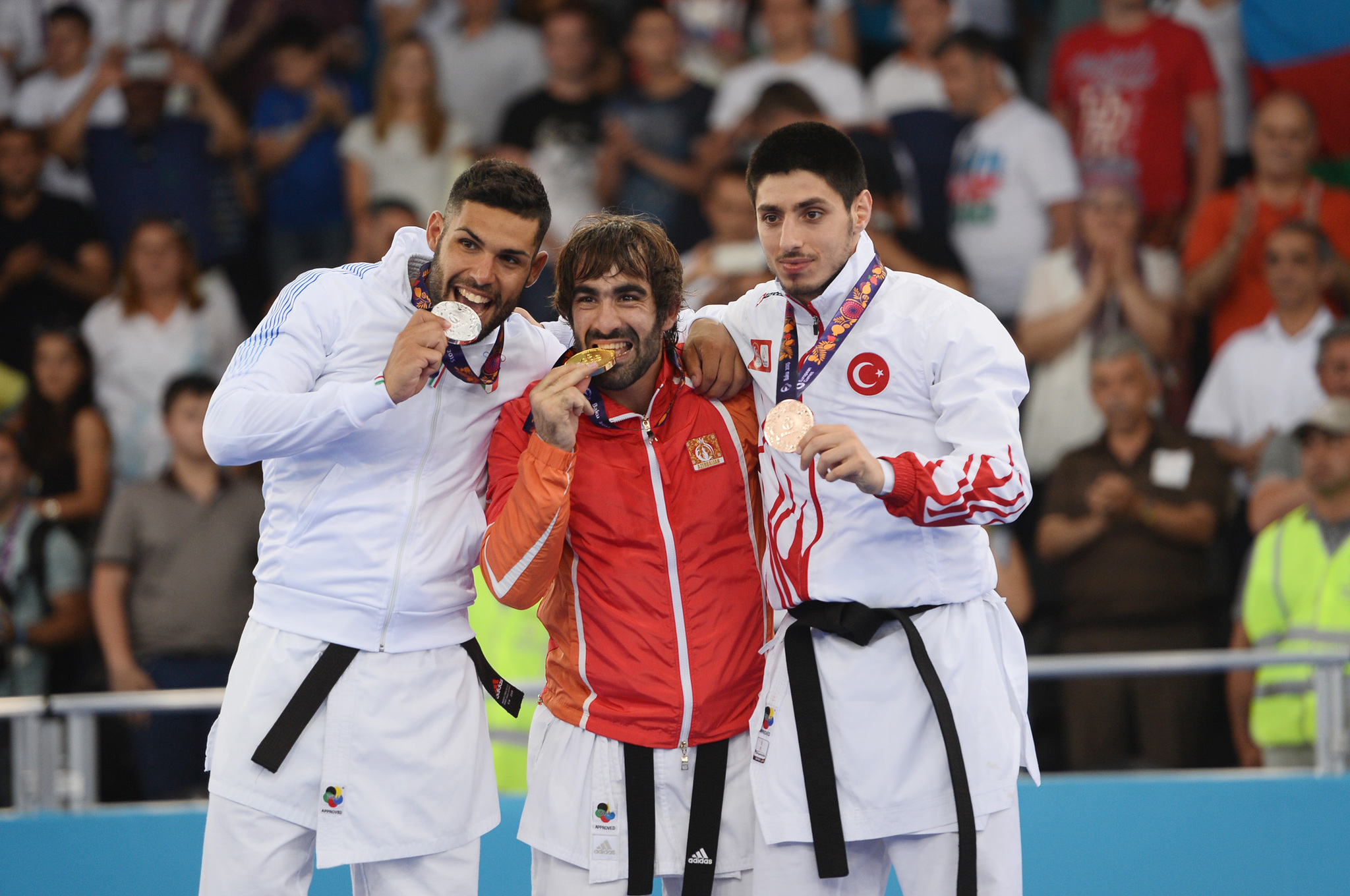
Busà in 2015 (left)

Luigi Busà (born 9 October 1987) is an Italian karateka. He is a two-time gold medalist at the World Karate Championships and a five-time gold medalist at the European Karate Championships. He represented Italy at the 2020 Summer Olympics in Tokyo, Japan, winning the first-ever gold medal in the men's kumite 75 kg event.

== Career ==
In 2015, Busà won the silver medal in the men's kumite 75 kg event at the 2015 European Games held in Baku, Azerbaijan. In the final, he lost against Rafael Aghayev of Azerbaijan.

In 2019, Busà won the gold medal in the men's kumite 75 kg event at the 2019 European Karate Championships held in Guadalajara, Spain.

He won one of the bronze medals in the men's 75 kg event at the 2022 Mediterranean Games held in Oran, Algeria.

== Achievements ==
| Year | Competition | Venue | Rank | Event |
|---|---|---|---|---|
| 2006 | World Championships | Tampere, Finland | 1st | Kumite 80 kg |
| 2009 | Mediterranean Games | Pescara, Italy | 2nd | Kumite 75 kg |
| 2010 | World Championships | Belgrade, Serbia | 2nd | Kumite 75 kg |
| 2012 | World Championships | Paris, France | 1st | Kumite 75 kg |
| 2013 | Mediterranean Games | Mersin, Turkey | 3rd | Kumite 75 kg |
| 2015 | European Games | Baku, Azerbaijan | 2nd | Kumite 75 kg |
| 2021 | Summer Olympics | Tokyo, Japan | 1st | Kumite 75 kg |

== See also ==
- Italy at the 2020 Summer Olympics
