= Enes Bulut =

Turkish karateka (born 2001)

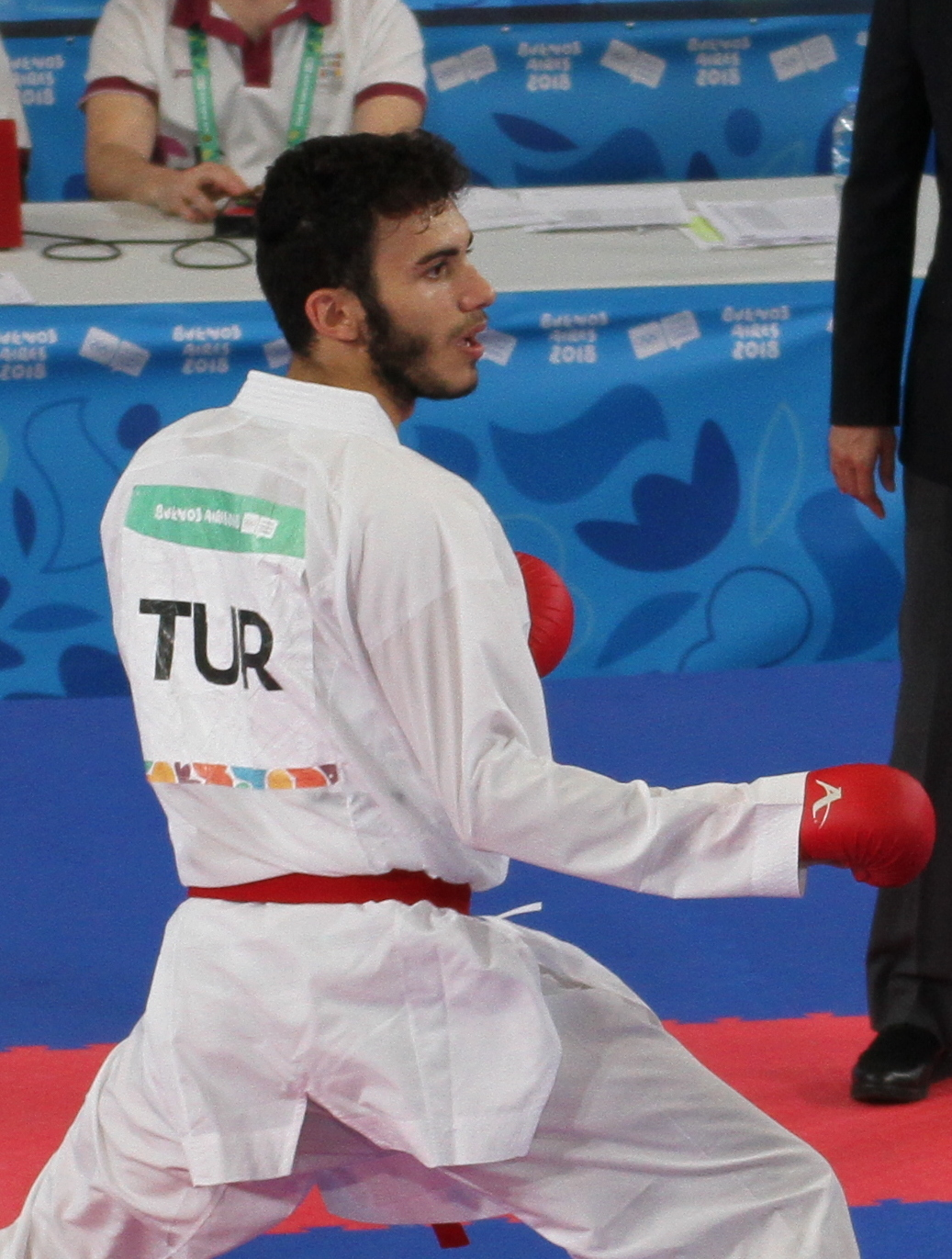
- Bulut at the 2018 Summer Youth Olympics
- Born: 7 February 2001 (age 25); Kocaeli, Turkey
- Nationality: Turkish
- Height: 1.83 m (6 ft 0 in)
- Weight: 75 kg (165 lb)
- Style: Karate Kumite
- Team: Kocaeli Kağıt

Enes Bulut (born 7 February 2001) is a Turkish karateka competing in the kumite.

== Career ==
In June 2018, he qualified for the 2018 Summer Youth Olympics at the qualification event held in Umag, Croatia. In October 2018, he won the silver medal in the boys' kumite +68 kg event at the Summer Youth Olympics held in Buenos Aires, Argentina.

He won one of the bronze medals in the men's 75 kg event at the 2024 European Karate Championships held in Zadar, Croatia.
