= Stanislav Horuna =

Ukrainian karateka (born 1989)

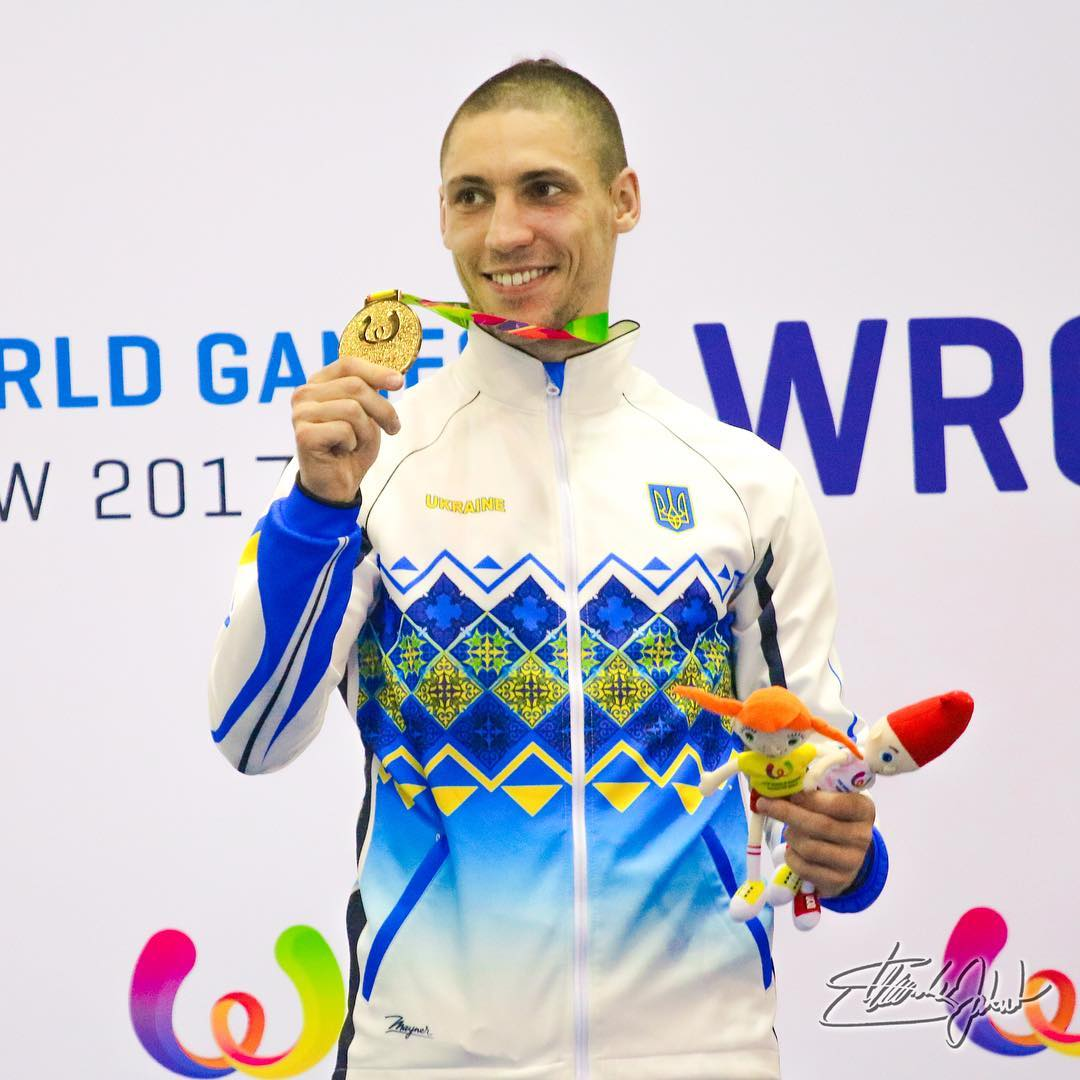
- Horuna in 2017

Personal information
- Native name: Станіслав Миколайович Горуна
- Full name: Stanislav Mykolayovych Horuna
- National team: Ukraine
- Citizenship: Ukraine
- Born: 1 March 1989 (age 37) Lviv, Ukrainian SSR, Soviet Union
- Height: 178 cm (5 ft 10 in)
- Weight: 75 kg (165 lb)

Sport
- Country: Ukraine
- Sport: karate
- Weight class: -75 kg
- Rank: Honored master of sport of international class
- Club: "Union" (Lviv)
- Team: Ukraine
- Coached by: Anton Nikulin
Medal record
Men's karate
Representing Ukraine
Olympic Games
Bronze medal – third place	2020 Tokyo	–75 kg
World Championships
Bronze medal – third place	2014 Bremen	–75 kg
World Games
Gold medal – first place	2017 Wrocław	–75 kg
Silver medal – second place	2022 Birmingham	–75 kg
European Games
Gold medal – first place	2019 Minsk	–75 kg
European Championships
Gold medal – first place	2021 Poreč	–75 kg
Gold medal – first place	2023 Guadalajara	Team kumite
Silver medal – second place	2014 Tampere	–75 kg
Silver medal – second place	2017 İzmit	–75 kg
Bronze medal – third place	2017 İzmit	Team kumite
Bronze medal – third place	2018 Novi Sad	–75 kg
Bronze medal – third place	2018 Novi Sad	Team kumite
Bronze medal – third place	2019 Guadalajara	–75 kg
Bronze medal – third place	2021 Poreč	Team kumite
Bronze medal – third place	2024 Zadar	Team kumite

Stanislav Mykolayovych Horuna (Ukrainian: Станіслав Миколайович Горуна; born 1 March 1989) is a Ukrainian athlete (karate) in the category of kumite (75 kg). He was a bronze medalist of European Championship 2018 in an individual and team category. Silver medalist of European Championship 2014, silver medalist of European Championship 2017 in individual category and bronze medalist in team category in kumite, bronze medalist of World Championship 2014, three-time winner of series of tournaments K1 Premier League (2013, 2014, 2017), six-time champion of Ukraine in karate. Champion of European Games 2019 and Worlds Games 2019. Qualified for Olympic Games in Tokyo (2020) Honoured master of sport of international class. A captain of Ukraine national team. 2nd on voting Athlete of the year 2019 according to IWGA.

== Biography ==
He was born in Lviv, in a family of businessmen. Went to Lviv high school No. 53 with profound learning of English language (from 2007 is a gymnasium "Prestige" with profound learning of foreign languages). In 2011, finished the faculty of law in Lviv National University of Ivan Franco, area of expertise — jurisprudence. Lives in Lviv, practicing lawyer.

Passion for sport showed up in early years: Horuna visited sessions of Taekwondo, however in age 13, he visited karate practice of Anton Nikulin, after that he fully devoted himself to this kind of martial arts. Soon his younger brother — Yaroslav Horuna started practicing in the Lviv club of sporting karate "Union" and is the champion of Ukraine in karate in category 84 kg.

The first and only trainer of Horuna is Anton Nikulin.

Among his hobbies are sky diving, snowboarding, tennis.

He is one of the characters in online game KARATE-DO.

As of March 2022, he is a Ukrainian soldier after Russia invaded Ukraine in February 2022.

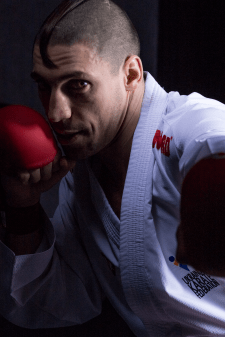
Ukrainian karateka Horuna

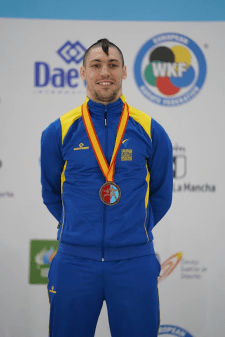
Horuna on pedistal

== Career ==
Horuna became first Ukrainian karate athlete that won a medal in World Championship among adults (bronze, Bremen, 2014). However, ambiguous judging during the fight of Horuna with Japanese Тані Руічі Tani Ryuichi for reaching the final of Championship caused a discussion, at first the winner of duel was named Horuna. But a judicial assembly recalls athletes on tatami and declares the winner of fight and finalist of Championship Japanese athlete. Within the framework of 22-th World Championship in karate this duel is considered most controversial (and, not only on tatami, but also in the political aspect).

Horuna heads the rating of series of competitions K1 Premier League and declares the winner (Grand Winner) of Premiere-league three times in 2013, 2014 and 2017. The serious injury of knee in 2015 forced one of world leaders in karate to stop training and, accordingly, participating in competitions. In 2017, on K1 Premier League Paris Open 2017 (this premiere league became the most massive in history of competitions (1243 athletes from 78 countries of the world)), Horuna triumphally returns on the first step of pedestal in France. Conducting 7 fights, Horuna brings the gold medal to Ukraine in the most numerous (140 participants from 42 countries) category.

== European Champion ==
On May 22, 2021, in the final of the European Championship, he defeated the legend of world karate Rafael Aghayev by a ratio of 3: 1, when he kicked his head, coach Anton Nikulin demanded the control of video judges and they recognized three points 6 seconds before the end. For the first time in his career, he became the European Champion in karate - men's kumite -75 kg.

== Sport achievements ==
=== World Championships ===
22nd World karate Championship 2014	Bronze (kumite)	Bremen (Germany), 2014.

=== World Cups ===
K1 World Cup	Gold (kumite)	Gold (team kumite)	Lasko (Slovenia), 2014.

=== European Championships ===
56 EKF SENIOR CHAMPIONSHIPS	Gold (kumite)	Poreč (Croatia), 2021.
54 EKF SENIOR CHAMPIONSHIPS	Bronze (kumite)	Guadalajara (Spain), 2019.
53 EKF SENIOR CHAMPIONSHIPS	Bronze (kumite), Bronze (team kumite)	Novi Sad (Serbia), 2018.
52 European Senior Championship	Silver (kumite)Bronze (team kumite)	Izmit (Turkey), 2017
49 European Senior Championship	Silver	Tampere (Finland), 2014
European Championship by Regions	Bronze	Herceg Novi(Montenegro), 2013
European University Championship	Gold (kumite), Bronze (team kumite)	Sarajevo (Bosnia and Herzegovina) 2011

=== K1 Premier Leagues ===
Silver	Salzburg (Austria) 2020
Bronze	Tokio (Japan) 2019
Gold	Rabat (Morocco) 2019
Bronze	Paris (France) 2019
Bronze	Paris (France) 2018
Gold	Paris (France) 2018
Gold	Istanbul (Turkey) 2018
Bronze	Dubai (OAU) 2018
Bronze	Paris (France) 2015
Gold	Paris (France) 2014
Gold	Dordrecht (Netherlands) 2013
Silver	Tyumen (Russia) 2013
Gold	Frankfurt (Germany) 2013
Silver	Salzburg (Austria) 2012
Bronze	Dubai (OAU) 2017

=== Another competitions ===
USA open 2011	SILVER
USA open 2012	BRONZE
Wasquehal Open 2010	SILVER
Wasquehal Open 2011	GOLD
Wasquehal Open 2012	GOLD
Wasquehal Open2014	GOLD
Italian Open 2011	GOLD
Dutch Open 2011	SILVER
Dutch Open 2009	BRONZE
Dutch Open 2010	BRONZE
Austrian Open 2009	SILVER
Austrian Open 2011	BRONZE
Qatar Open 2014	BRONZE
1st International karate tournament TOP 10 2013	GOLD(category OPEN)
2nd International karate tournament TOP 10 2014	GOLD(category OPEN)
Super 8 (Croatia Cup 2014)	BRONZE (category OPEN)
New York international Open 2015	GOLD

== Titles ==
- Vice-sportsman of 2019 according to IWGA
- The best sportsmen of Lviv region in February 2018
- Sportsmen of the year in 2014
- The best sportsmen of Lviv region in January 2017
- The best sportsmen of Lviv region in July 2017 as a result of achievements on World Games in Wroclaw (first gold medal of this competition in Lviv)
- Medalist of the Order for Merit, 3rd Class
- Medalist of the Order for Merit, 2nd Class

== Achievements ==
- 7th in top-10 best athletes in Ukraine in 2014 according to Ukrainian Sports Press Association
- 7th in top-10 athletes-nonolympians for 25 years of independency of Ukraine
- 10th in rating of 10 most important achievements of Ukrainian athletes in 2014

== Sources ==
1. Born to win: Stanislav Horuna and Anton Nikulin about the success on Open-de-Paris 2017 http://karate.ru/news/2017-02-02/rozhdennye-pobezhdat-stanislav-goruna-i-anton-nikulin-paris-2017/

2. Stas Horuna: «Want something bigger — become better!» http://karate.ru/articles/stas-goruna-hochesh-bolshego-stanovis-luchshim/

3. Ukrainian karate athletes won medals of World Championship for the first time http://comments.ua/sport/495298-ukrainskie-karatisti-vpervie-zavoevali.html

4. Ukrainian S. Horuna was the best on World competition in France http://comments.ua/sport/495298-ukrainskie-karatisti-vpervie-zavoevali.html

5. Citizen of Lviv Stanislav Horuna — bronze medalist of WC-2014 in karate http://ns3.for.lviv.ua/novyny/suspilstvo/35453-lviv-ianyn-stanislav-horuna-bronzovyi-pryzer-chs-2014-z-karate

6. Stanislav Horuna: the art of power, will and endurance http://zaxid.net/news/showNews.do?stanislav_goruna_mistetstvo_sili_voli_ta_vitrivalosti&objectId=79091

7. Karate athlete from Lviv Stanislav Horuna — winner of international competition.

8. Ukraine's Stanislav Horuna wins Kosovo's TOP 10 for 2nd time https://web.archive.org/web/20151015234756/http://www.karate-news.net/ukraines-stanislav-horuna-wins-kosovos-top-10-for-2nd-time/

9. Citizen of Lviv Stanislav Horuna won historical medal on World Championship in karate http://dailylviv.com/news/sport/lvivyanyn-stanislav-horuna-zdobuv-istorychnu-medal-na-chempionati-svitu-z-karate-12858
