= Abdalla Abdelaziz =

Egyptian karateka (born 1999)

Personal information
- Full name: Abdalla Mamduh Abdelaziz
- Born: 29 March 1999 (age 27)

Sport
- Country: Egypt
- Sport: Karate
- Weight class: 75 kg
- Events: Kumite; Team kumite
Medal record
Men's karate
Representing Egypt
World Championships
| Gold medal – first place | 2023 Budapest | Kumite 75 kg |
| Gold medal – first place | 2025 Cairo | Kumite 75 kg |
| Silver medal – second place | 2021 Dubai | Kumite 75 kg |
| Silver medal – second place | 2023 Budapest | Team kumite |
World Games
| Gold medal – first place | 2022 Birmingham | Kumite 75 kg |
| Bronze medal – third place | 2025 Chengdu | Kumite 75 kg |
African Games
| Gold medal – first place | 2023 Accra | Kumite 75 kg |
| Gold medal – first place | 2023 Accra | Team kumite |
| Silver medal – second place | 2019 Rabat | Kumite 75 kg |
| Bronze medal – third place | 2019 Rabat | Team kumite |
Mediterranean Games
| Silver medal – second place | 2022 Oran | Kumite 75 kg |

Abdalla Mamduh Abdelaziz (born 29 March 1999) is an Egyptian karateka. He won the silver medal in the men's 75 kg event at the 2021 World Karate Championships held in Dubai, United Arab Emirates. He won silver medal in the Men's Individual -75 kg Kumite Karate at the 2019 African Games was held from 24 to 26 August 2019 in Rabat, Morocco and gold medal in the Men's Individual -75 kg Kumite (UFAK) JUNIOR & SENIOR CHAMPIONSHIPS ( Continental Championship) 2020 at Tangier, Morocco.

== Career ==
Previously he won two time bronze Medals in Junior, Cadet and U21 World Championship in the year of 2015 and 2019. He also won several medals, including gold, Silver and bronze medals in the African Continental Championship & Mediterranean Championships as well as World Karate Federation Karate 1 Premier League and Series A Championships.

== Achievements ==
He qualified for the 2020 Summer Olympics in Tokyo, Japan Continental Representation qualifying spots, where karate will be featured for the first time and Now he will represent Egypt Team at the 2020 Summer Olympics at the Karate competition of the 2020 Summer Olympics in Tokyo, Japan

Competition Results
| YEAR | COMPETITION | VENUE | RANK/POSITION | EVENT |
|---|---|---|---|---|
| 2021 | Karate 1 Premier League | Lisbon Portugal | Bronze | Individual -75 kg Kumite |
| 2020 | Karate 1 Premier League | Dubai United Arab Emirates | Bronze | Individual -75 kg Kumite |
| 2020 | UFAK JUNIOR & SENIOR CHAMPIONSHIPS | Tangier Morocco | Gold | Individual -75 kg Kumite |
| 2019 | Junior, Cadet and U21 World Karate Championship | Santiago Chile | Bronze | U21 Individual -75 kg Kumite |
| 2019 | UFAK JUNIOR & SENIOR CHAMPIONSHIPS | Gaborone Botswana | Silver | Individual -75 kg Kumite |
| 2019 | Karate 1 Premier League | Shanghai China | 7th | Individual -75 kg Kumite |
| 2019 | 2019 KARATE1 SERIES A | Istanbul Turkey | Bronze | Individual -75 kg Kumite |
| 2019 | 2019 KARATE1 SERIES A | Salzburg Austria | 5th | Individual -75 kg Kumite |
| 2018 | Senior World Karate Championship | Madrid Spain | Participation | Individual -75 kg Kumite |
| 2018 | UFAK JUNIOR & SENIOR CHAMPIONSHIPS | RWA Rwanda | Gold | Individual -75 kg Kumite |
| 2017 | Karate 1 Premier League | Rabat Morocco | 9th | Individual -67 kg Kumite |
| 2015 | Junior, Cadet and U21 World Karate Championship | Jakarta Indonesia | Bronze | Junior Individual -61 kg Kumite |
