= Daniele De Vivo =

Italian karateka (born 2003)

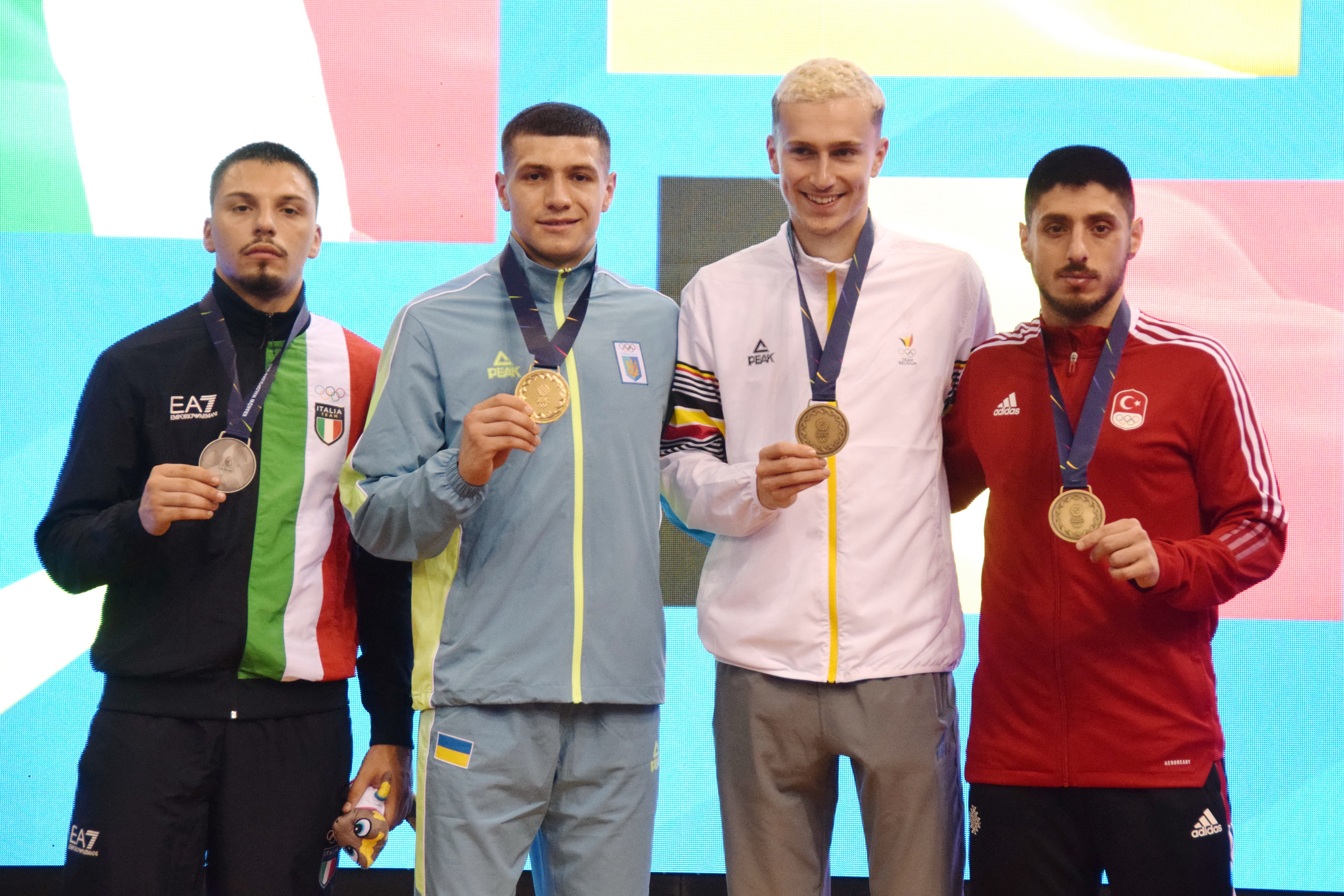
- De Vivo (left) at the 2023 European Games

Personal information
- Born: 18 January 2003 (age 23)

Sport
- Country: Italy
- Sport: Karate
- Weight class: 75 kg
- Events: Kumite; Team kumite
Medal record
Men's karate
Representing Italy
World Championships
Gold medal – first place	2021 Dubai	Team kumite
European Games
Silver medal – second place	2023 Kraków-Małopolska	Kumite 75 kg
European Championships
Gold medal – first place	2024 Zadar	Team kumite
Gold medal – first place	2025 Yerevan	Team kumite
Gold medal – first place	2026 Frankfurt	Team kumite
Silver medal – second place	2024 Zadar	Kumite 75 kg
Mediterranean Games
Bronze medal – third place	2026 Taranto	Kumite 75 kg

Daniele De Vivo (born 18 January 2003) is an Italian karateka. He won the silver medal in the men's 75 kg event at the 2023 European Games held in Poland. He also won the silver medal in the men's 75 kg event at the European Karate Championships held in Zadar, Croatia. De Vivo is also a three-time gold medalist in the men's team kumite event at the European Karate Championships.

== Achievements ==
Year	Competition	Venue	Rank	Event
2021	World Championships	Dubai, United Arab Emirates	1st	Team kumite
2023	European Games	Kraków and Małopolska, Poland	2nd	Kumite 75 kg
2024	European Championships	Zadar, Croatia	2nd	Kumite 75 kg
2024	European Championships	Zadar, Croatia	1st	Team kumite
2025	European Championships	Yerevan, Armenia	1st	Team kumite
2026	European Championships	Frankfurt, Germany	1st	Team kumite
