= Stefan Pokorny =

Austrian karateka

Sport
- Country: Austria
- Sport: Karate
- Weight class: 67 kg
- Event: Kumite
Medal record
Men's karate
Representing Austria
European Championships
Bronze medal – third place	2018 Novi Sad	Kumite 67 kg
Bronze medal – third place	2019 Guadalajara	Kumite 67 kg
Bronze medal – third place	2021 Poreč	Kumite 67 kg

Stefan Pokorny is an Austrian karateka. He is a three-time bronze medalist in the men's kumite 67 kg event at the European Karate Championships.

== Career ==
At the 2016 World University Karate Championships held in Braga, Portugal, Pokorny won the silver medal in the men's kumite 67 kg event.

In 2018, Pokorny competed in the men's 67 kg event at the World Karate Championships in Madrid, Spain. He also represented Austria at the 2019 European Games in Minsk, Belarus.

In May 2021, Pokorny won one of the bronze medals in the men's kumite 67 kg event at the European Karate Championships held in Poreč, Croatia. In June 2021, he competed at the World Olympic Qualification Tournament held in Paris, France hoping to qualify for the 2020 Summer Olympics in Tokyo, Japan.

== Achievements ==
Year	Competition	Venue	Rank	Event
2018	European Championships	Novi Sad, Serbia	3rd	Kumite 67 kg
2019	European Championships	Guadalajara, Spain	3rd	Kumite 67 kg
2021	European Championships	Poreč, Croatia	3rd	Kumite 67 kg
