= Gábor Hárspataki =

Hungarian karateka (born 1996)

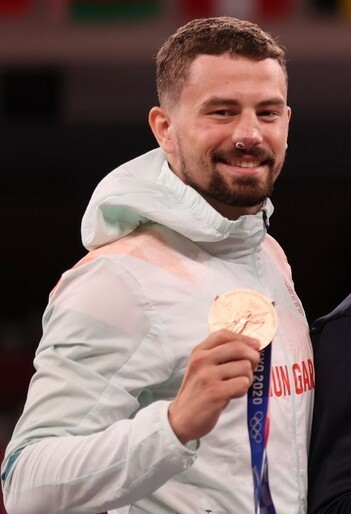
- Hárspataki at the 2020 Summer Olympics

Personal information
- Full name: Károly Gábor Hárspataki
- Born: 27 February 1996 (age 30)

Sport
- Country: Hungary
- Sport: Karate
- Weight class: 75 kg
- Event: Kumite
Medal record
Men's karate
Representing Hungary
Olympic Games
| Bronze medal – third place | 2020 Tokyo | 75 kg |
World Championships
| Silver medal – second place | 2023 Budapest | 75 kg |
European Games
| Bronze medal – third place | 2019 Minsk | 75 kg |
European Championships
| Silver medal – second place | 2018 Novi Sad | 75 kg |
| Bronze medal – third place | 2017 İzmit | 75 kg |

Károly Gábor Hárspataki (born 27 February 1996) is a Hungarian karateka. He won one of the bronze medals in the men's 75 kg event at the 2020 Summer Olympics held in Tokyo, Japan. He won the silver medal in the men's 75 kg event at the 2023 World Karate Championships held in Budapest, Hungary.

== Career ==
In 2019, he won one of the bronze medals in the men's kumite 75 kg event at the European Games held in Minsk, Belarus. In 2021, he qualified at the World Olympic Qualification Tournament held in Paris, France to compete at the 2020 Summer Olympics in Tokyo, Japan. In November 2021, he competed in the men's 75 kg event at the 2021 World Karate Championships held in Dubai, United Arab Emirates.

He competed in the men's kumite 75 kg event at the 2022 World Games held in Birmingham, United States. He finished in third place in his pool in the elimination round and he did not advance to compete in the semi-finals.

== Achievements ==
| Year | Competition | Venue | Rank | Event |
|---|---|---|---|---|
| 2017 | European Championships | İzmit, Turkey | 3rd | Kumite 75 kg |
| 2018 | European Championships | Novi Sad, Serbia | 2nd | Kumite 75 kg |
| 2019 | European Games | Minsk, Belarus | 3rd | Kumite 75 kg |
| 2021 | Summer Olympics | Tokyo, Japan | 3rd | Kumite 75 kg |
| 2023 | World Championships | Budapest, Hungary | 2nd | Kumite 75 kg |
