= Erman Eltemur =

Turkish karateka (born 1993)

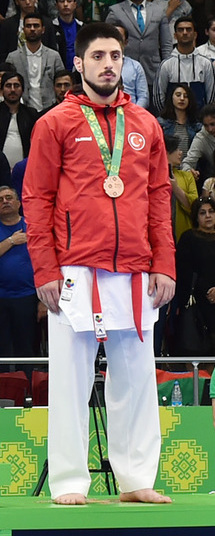
- Born: May 11, 1993 (age 33); İstanbul, İstanbul Province, Turkey
- Nationality: Turkish
- Division: 75 kg
- Style: Karate Kumite
- Team: Istanbul BB SK

Erman Eltemur (born May 11, 1993) is a Turkish karateka competing in the kumite −75 kg division. Born in İstanbul, İstanbul province, he resides in Istanbul, where he is a member of İstanbul Büyükşehir Belediyesi S.K.

== Achievements ==
2014

- Silver European Championships – 4 May, Tampere, FIN – Team kumite,
- Bronze World Championships – 9 November, Bremen, GER – Team kumite,

2015

- Bronze European Games – 13 June, Baku, AZE – kumite 75 kg,

2016

- Silver European Championships – 7 May, Montpellier, FRA – kumite 75 kg,

2017

- Bronze European Championships – 6 May, İzmit, TUR – kumite 67 kg,
