= Quentin Mahauden =

Belgian karateka (born 2001)

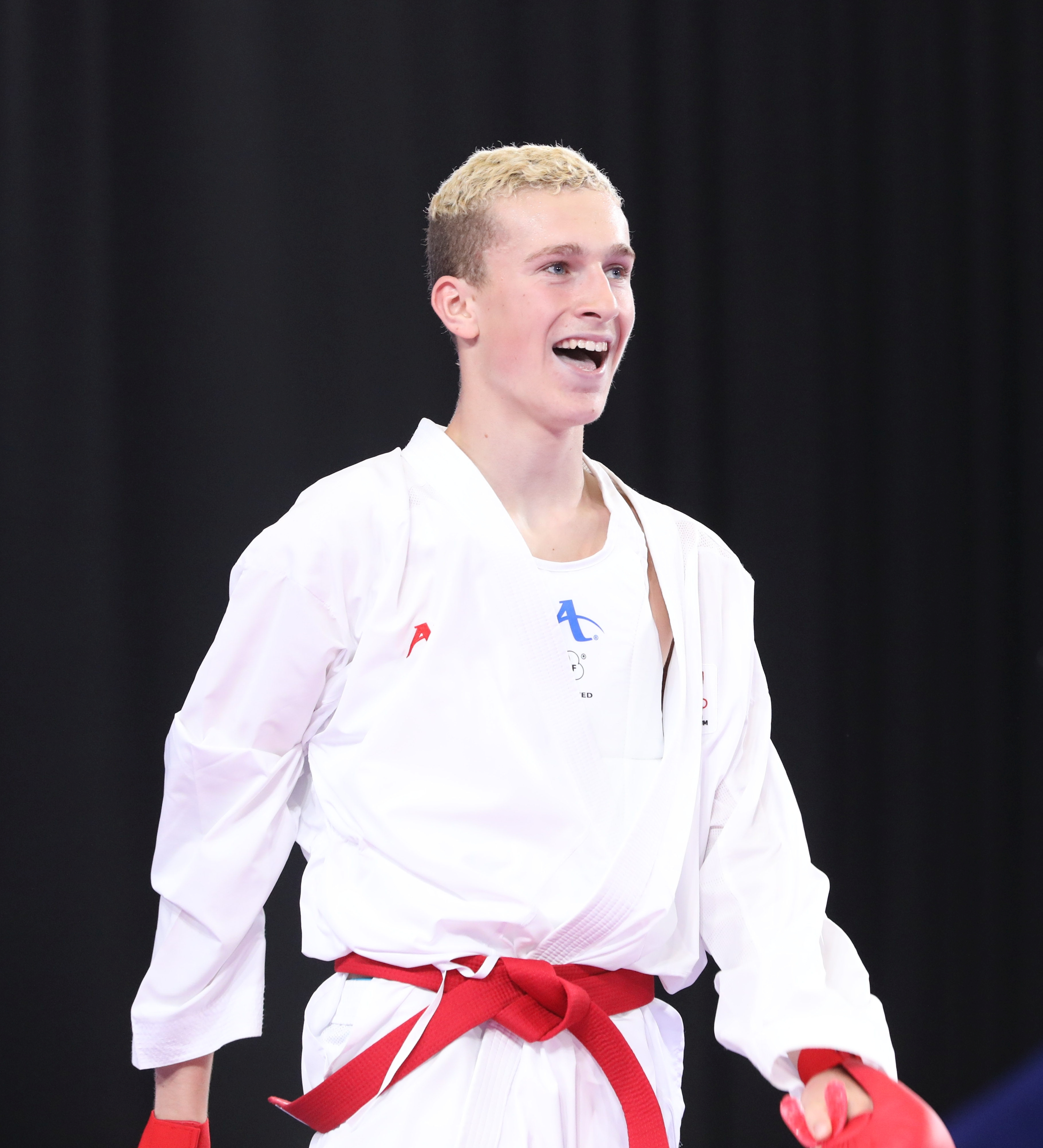
- Mahauden at the 2018 Summer Youth Olympics
- Born: 12 March 2001 (age 25); Nivelles, Belgium
- Nationality: Belgium

Quentin Mahauden (born 12 March 2001) is a Belgian karateka. He won one of the bronze medals in the men's kumite 75 kg event at the 2023 European Games held in Poland. He also won a bronze medal at the 2023 European Karate Championships held in Guadalajara, Spain.

== Career ==
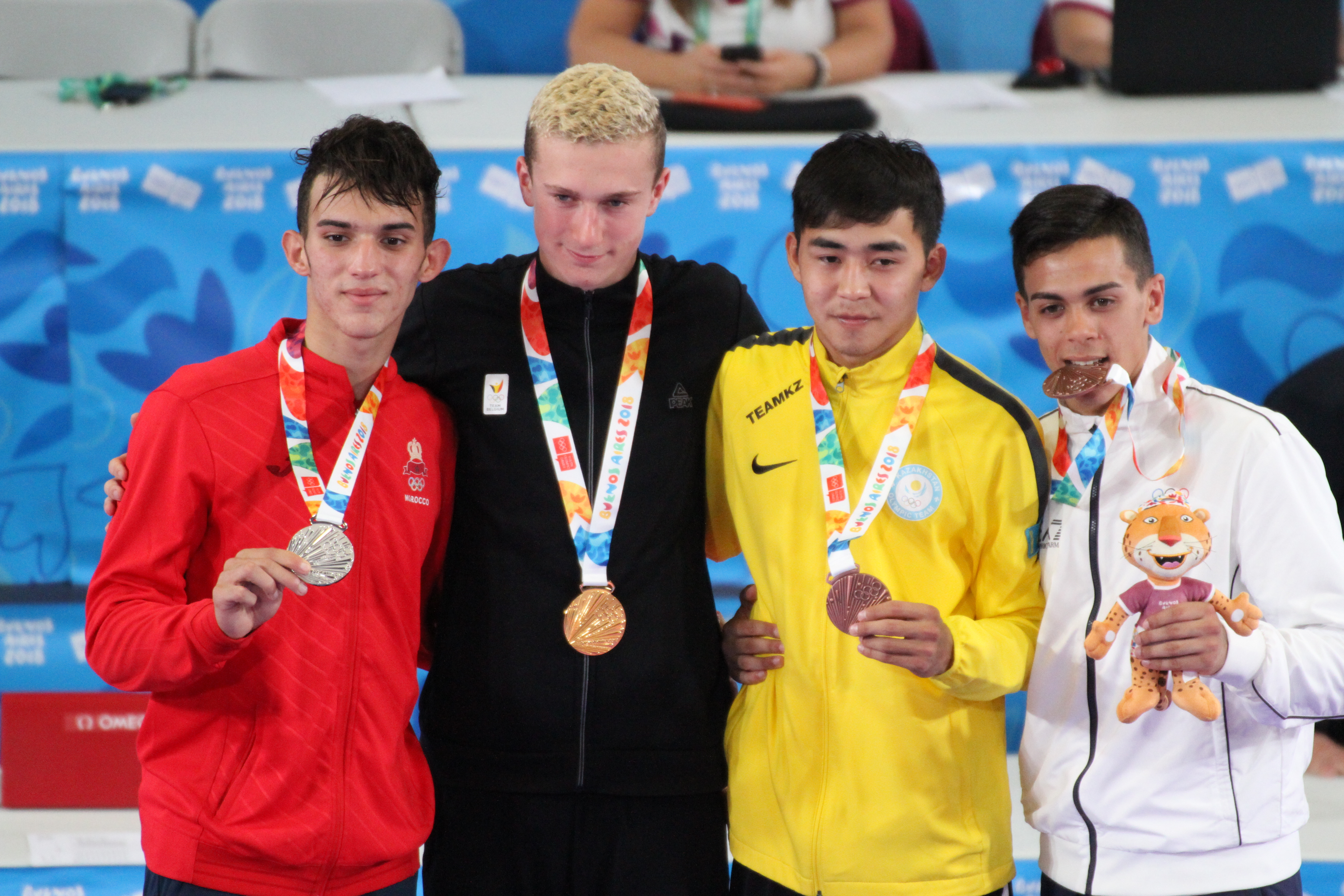
Mahauden at the Boys' 68 kg victory ceremony

Quentin Mahauden is a gold medalist in kumite in the under 68 kg category at the 2018 Summer Youth Olympics in Buenos Aires, Argentina. He is a bronze medalist in the under 75 kg category at the 2023 European Championships in Guadalajara, Mexico.
