= Timur (given name) =

Temur Ansari

- Gender: Male
- Language: Adyghe: Тимур; Azerbaijani: Teymur; Chechen: Тимур; Georgian: თემურ Ingush: Темар; Kazakh: Темiр, Темур, Тимур; Kazakh Latin: Temir; Mongolian: Төмөр, ᠲᠡᠮᠦᠷ; Old Turkic: Temür; Ossetian: Тимур; Russian: Тимур; Tatar: Тимур; Turkish: Timur, Temur; Ukrainian: Тимур; Uzbek: Temur

Origin
- Origin: Old Turkic or Ancient Mongolian
- Meaning: "Iron"

Other names
- Related names: Taimur, Temur, Temür, Temir, Teymur, Tömör Tamerlan, Tymour, Damir, Demir

Timur is a masculine Turkic and Mongolic given name which literally means iron. It is a cognate of the Turkish name Demir. In Indonesian, timur translates to east, and symbolizes hope by the rising sun.

Timur (Russian: Тиму́р) is also a popular name for boys in post-Soviet states, due in part to its usage in the novel Timur and His Squad by Arkady Gaidar.

Notable people with the given name include:

== Rulers ==
- Timur (1336–1405), Central Asian ruler also known as Tamerlane
- Timur II, real name Neku Siyar (1679–1723), a de facto Mughal emperor
- Timur Shah Durrani (1746–1793), an Afghan ruler

== Modern world ==
- Timur Beg (1886–1933), Uyghur rebel leader
- Timur Bekmambetov (born 1961), Kazakh film and advertisement director
- Timur Bekmansurov, Russian school shooter
- Timur Bilyalov (born 1995), Russian hockey goaltender
- Timur Dibirov (born 1983), Russian handball player
- Timur Dzhabrailov (born 1973), Russian footballer
- Timur Faizutdinov (2001–2021), Russian ice hockey defenseman
- Timur Frunze, Russian fighter pilot
- Timur Gareev (born 1988), Uzbekistani chess player
- Timur Ibragimov (born 1975), Uzbekistani boxer
- Timur Kapadze (born 1981), Uzbekistani footballer
- Timur Kulibayev (born 1966), Kazakh billionaire
- Timur Kuran (born 1954), American economist and political scientist
- Timur Mindich (born 1979), Ukrainian-Israeli entrepreneur and film producer
- Timur Miroshnychenko, a Ukrainian TV presenter
- Timur Mutsurayev (born 1976), Chechen singer and bard
- Timur Naniev (born 1994), Russian weightlifter
- Timur Pradopo (born 1955), Chief of the Indonesian National Police
- Timur Rakhmatullin (born 1983), Russian footballer
- Timur Rodriguez, Russian showman, singer, TV and radio personality
- Timur Selçuk (1946–2020), Turkish musician
- Timur Taymazov (born 1970), Ukrainian weightlifter
- Timur Tekkal (born 1981), German rugby union footballer
- Timur Yanyali (born 1975), Turkish footballer
- Timur Yunusov, Russian singer

== See also ==
- Temur, a list of people with the given name
- Taimur, a list of people with the given name or surname
- Timofey
