= Teymur =

Teymur, also spelt Teymour and Teimour, is a masculine given name and surname which may refer to:

== Given name ==
- Teymur Bakhtiar (1914–1970), Iranian military officer and founder and head of SAVAK, the Iranian secret service
- Teymour Boutros-Ghali, Egyptian-born, US-based investor and entrepreneur
- Teymur Bayramalibeyov (1863–1937), Azerbaijani historian, teacher, and journalist
- Teýmur Çaryýew (born 2000), Turkmenistani footballer
- Teymur Elchin (1924–1992), Azerbaijani poet and politician, member of the Azerbaijani Supreme Soviet
- Teymour Ghiasi (born 1946), Iranian high jumper
- Teymur Goychayev (born 1958), Azerbaijani conductor and composer
- Teymur Guliyev (1888–1965), Azerbaijani chairman of the Council of People's Commissars of the Transcaucasian Socialist Federative Soviet Republic
- Teymur Hajiyev (born 1982), Azerbaijani film director and producer
- Teymur Mammadov (born 1993), Azerbaijani amateur boxer
- Teymur Mirzoyev (1936—2021), Azerbaijani singer
- Teymur Musayev (born 1970), Minister of Healthcare of the Republic of Azerbaijan
- Teymur bey Novruzov (1880–1961), Imperial Russian officer and Azerbaijani major general
- Teimour Radjabov (born 1987), Azerbaijani chess grandmaster

== Surname ==
- Daniel Teymur (born 1988), Swedish mixed martial artist, brother of David Teymur
- David Teymur (born 1989), Swedish mixed martial artist

== See also ==
- Temur, a given name
- Timur (disambiguation)
- Taimur, a given name and surname
