= Timur (disambiguation) =

Timur was a Turkic-Mongolian ruler and founder of the Timurid Empire.

Timur may also refer to:

== People ==
- Timur (given name)
- Timur (surname)
- Timur Shah (King of the Durrani Empire)

== Other uses ==
- Amur and Timur, a tiger and a goat who became friends in a Russian safari park
- Timur, Nepali and Tamil name for the plant Zanthoxylum armatum, "rattan pepper"
- Timur, a special unit of the Main Directorate of Intelligence (Ukraine)

== See also ==
- Temir komuz, a Central Asian jaw harp
- Temur
- Timuri, a tribe in Afghanistan and Iran
- Demir (disambiguation), an alternative spelling
- Timor (disambiguation)
- Timir (disambiguation)
- Taimur (disambiguation), a list of people with the given name or surname
