= Demir =

Demir means iron in Turkish; it may refer to:

== Given name ==
- Demir Ege Tıknaz (born 2004), Turkish footballer
- Demir Elmaağaçlı (born 1990), Turkish archer
- Demir Demirkan (born 1972), Turkish rock musician and songwriter
- Demir Demirev (born 1984), Bulgarian weightlifter
- Demir Dragnev (born 1936), Moldovan historian
- Demir Hotić (born 1962), Bosnian footballer
- Demir Ramović (born 1982), Montenegrin footballer
- Demir Sabancı (born 1971), Turkish businessman

== Surname ==
- Demir or D. Mir, pseudonyms of Romanian poet Mircea Demetriade
- Alihan Demir (born 1996), Turkish basketball player
- Aslı Demir (born 1999), Turkish freestyle wrestler
- Aykut Demir, Turkish footballer
- Bahadır Demir (1942–1973), Turkish assassinated diplomat
- Cem Demir, Turkish footballer
- Ebru Demir (born 1976), Turkish social entrepreneur and chef
- Emine Demir (born 1993), Turkish footballer
- Erdin Demir, Swedish footballer of Turkish descent
- Evin Demir (born 2001), Turkish race walker
- Hakan Demir (politician) (born 1984), German politician
- Hamza Demir (born 1956), Swedish politician
- İlyas Demir, Turkish karateka
- Mahmut Demir, Turkish wrestler
- Mahmut Demir (futsal), Turkish futsal player
- Mazlum Demir (born 2003), Turkish racewalker
- Mustafa Demir (1961–2025), Turkish architect and politician
- Neslihan Demir Darnel (born 1983), Turkish volleyballer
- Orhan Demir, Canadian jazz guitarist
- Şennur Demir (born 1982), Turkish boxer and coach
- Sinem Dybvad Demir (born 1992), Danish politician
- Yusuf Demir (born 2003), Austrian footballer
- Zeki Demir, Turkish karateka

== See also ==
- Demir Kapija, town in the Republic of Macedonia
- Demir Hisar (town), town in the Republic of Macedonia
- Demirović
- Temur (disambiguation)
- Timur
- Demir, Kemaliye
