= Timurid =

Timurid refers to those descended from Timur (Tamerlane), a 14th-century conqueror:

- Timurid dynasty, a dynasty of Turco-Mongol lineage descended from Timur who established empires in Central Asia and the Indian subcontinent
  - Timurid Empire of Central Asia, founded by Timur
  - Mughal Empire of the Indian subcontinent, founded by Timur's descendants (also sometimes referred to as the 'Timurid Empire')

== See also ==
- Timur (disambiguation)
