= Timor (disambiguation) =

Timor is an island in southeast Asia.

Timor may also refer to:

- Timor, Victoria, a place in Australia
- Timor (mythology), the god of fear and horror in Roman mythology
- "Timor", a song from the 2005 album Oral Fixation, Vol. 2 by Shakira
- Timor Putra Nasional, commonly known as Timor, a former Indonesian automotive company
- Bar Timor (born 1992), Israeli basketball player

== See also ==
- Timur (disambiguation)
