= Tamerlane (disambiguation) =

Tamerlane or Timur was a Turco-Mongol conqueror and the founder of the Timurid Empire.

Tamerlane may also refer to:

== Arts and entertainment ==
- Tamerlane (play), a 1701 tragedy by Nicholas Rowe
- Tamerlane (poem), an 1827 poem by Edgar Allan Poe
- Barry & the Tamerlanes, an American doo-wop trio
- Tamerlane Chess, a chess variant

== Ships ==
- Tamerlane (1769 ship), a whaler, later a slave ship
- Tamerlane (1824 ship), a merchant ship

== Other uses ==
- Tamerlane Lincoln Kennedy (born 1971), American former football player

== See also ==
- Tamburlaine, a 1587 or 1588 play by Christopher Marlowe about the conqueror
- Tamerlan (given name)
