= Kia Sephia =

Compact car produced by Kia (1992-2003)

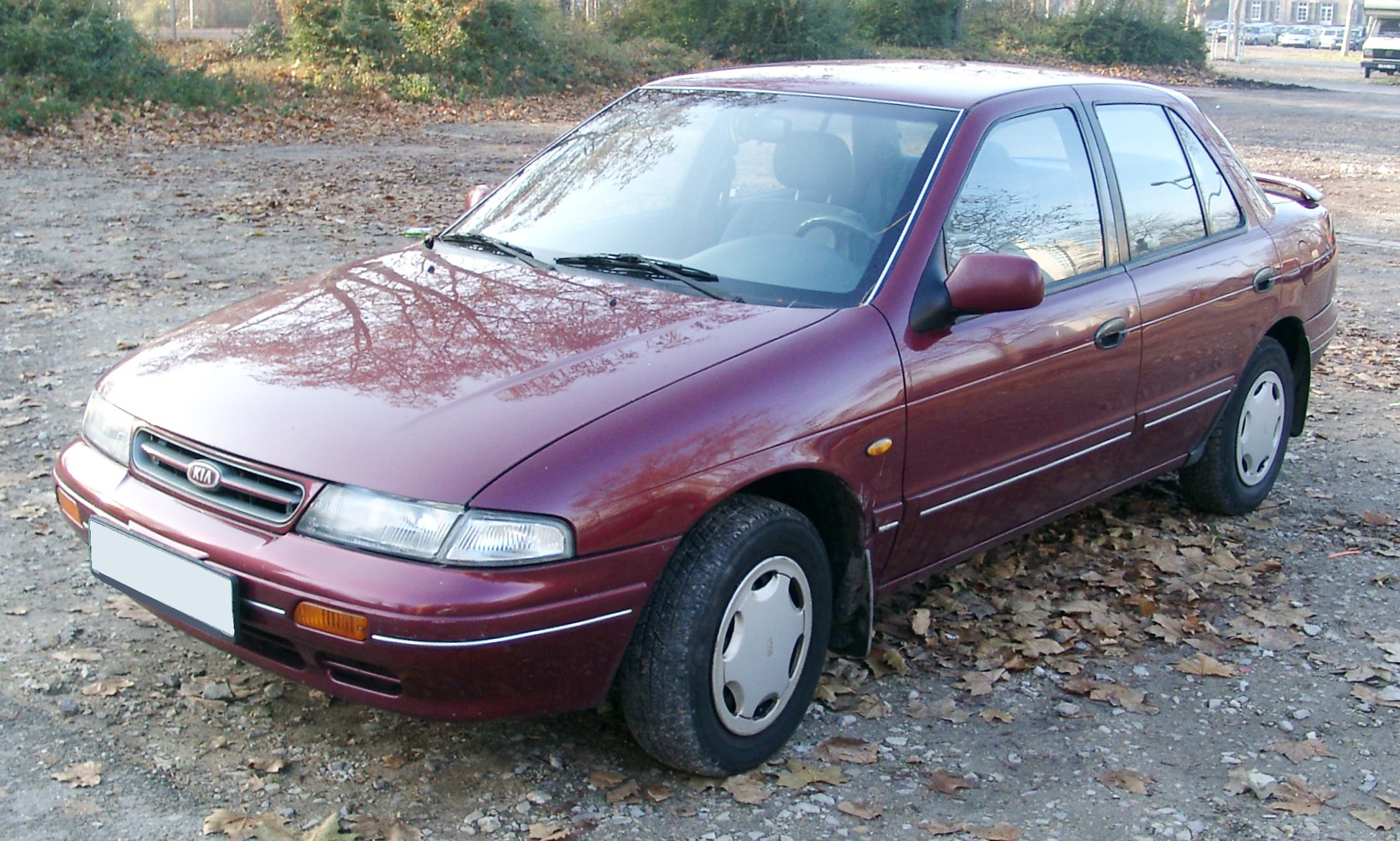
- 1992-1994 Kia Sephia

Overview
- Manufacturer: Kia Motors
- Production: September 1992–2003
- Model years: 1994–2001 (North America)

Body and chassis
- Class: Compact car (C)
- Layout: Transverse front-engine, front-wheel drive

Chronology
- Predecessor: Kia Capital / Kia Concord
- Successor: Kia Cerato / Kia Forte

The Kia Sephia is a compact car that was manufactured by the South Korean automaker Kia Motors from September 1992 to 2003.

The first generation Sephia was badged Kia Mentor in some markets, and as the Timor S515/S516 in Indonesia. This convention continued on with the second generation version, which was also badged Kia Shuma and Kia Spectra.

== First generation (1992) ==
First generation
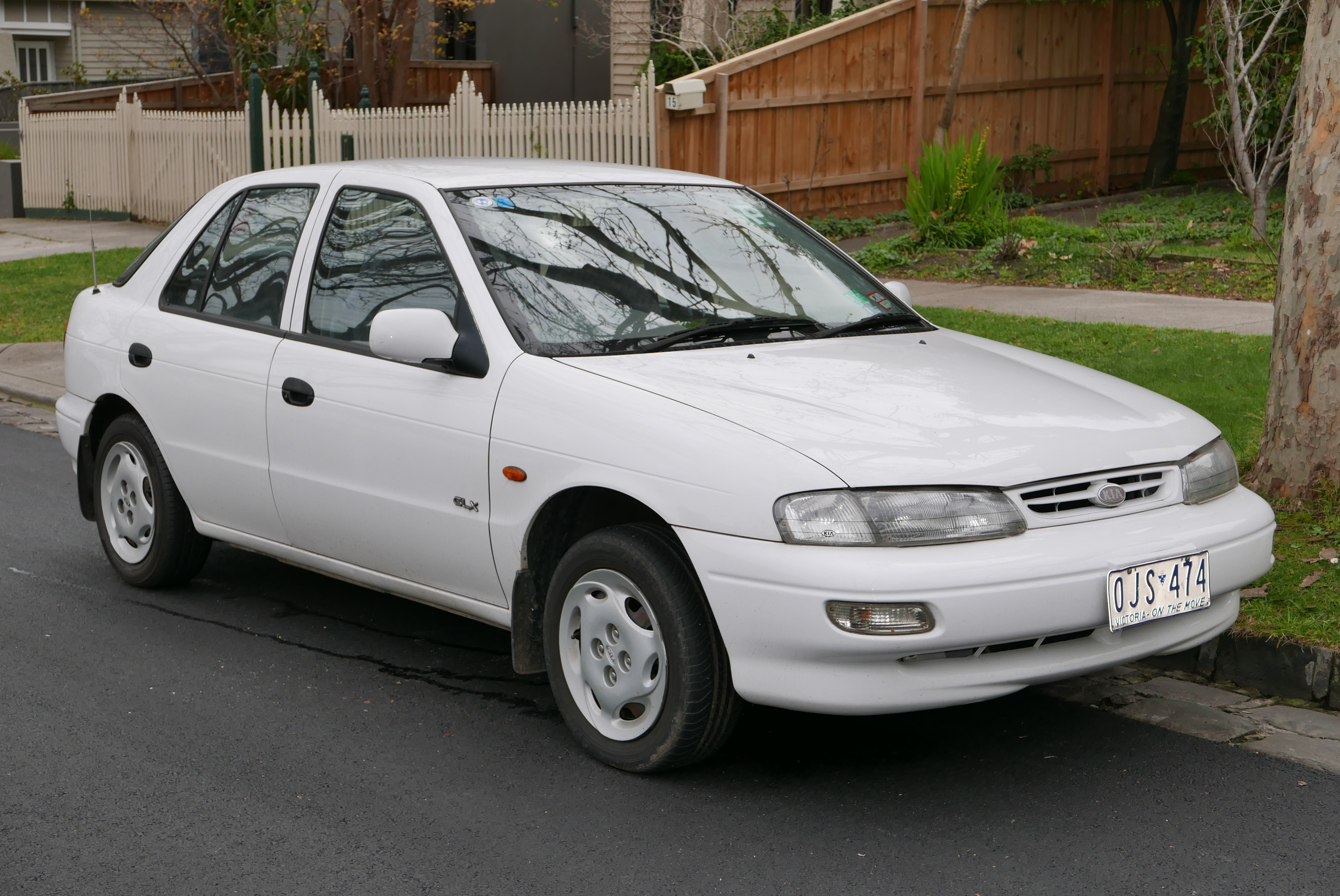
- 1994–1997 Kia Mentor GLX Liftback (Australia)

Overview
- Also called: Kia Mentor (Australia); Timor S515 (Indonesia)
- Production: September 1992–1997
- Model years: 1994–1997 (North America)
- Assembly: South Korea: Hwaseong (Hwaseong Plant); Indonesia: Tambun, Bekasi (Indauda); Purwakarta (Kia Timor Motors)

Body and chassis
- Body style: 4-door sedan 5-door liftback 5-door station wagon (Indonesia)

Powertrain
- Engine: 1.5 L B5-ME I4; 1.5 L B5-DE I4; 1.6 L B6D I4; 1.8 L BP I4
- Transmission: 5-speed manual; 4-speed F4A-EL automatic

Dimensions
- Wheelbase: 2,500 mm (98.4 in)
- Length: 4,360 mm (171.7 in)
- Width: 1,695 mm (66.7 in)
- Height: 1,390 mm (54.7 in)

The first-generation Kia Sephia is the first car that was actually designed by Kia with their own chassis. Engines available were the B-series engines, with the 1.5-liter rated at 59 kilowatts (79 hp), the 1.6-liter 78-kilowatt (105 hp), and the 1.8-liter BP engine at 91-kilowatt (122 hp) from 1994. The car was presented in September 1992 to replace the aging Capital, which was rapidly losing market share. The Sephia proved quite successful, selling over 100,000 in its first full year in the home market (1993). A total of 472,920 Sephias were sold over the life of the original Sephia.

In the United States, sales began in late 1993 for the 1994 model year. This was the first Kia to be exported to the US. An update came in the 1995 model year when grille and tail lights were restyled and all US-market Sephias except California-market RS/LS models got upgraded to the new 1.8-liter DOHC four-cylinder BP engine as used in the Mazda Familia (BG). Kia licensed the engine design from Mazda, but manufactured it themselves.

It was launched in Europe in the spring of 1994 as the Kia Sephia in some markets and in others, including the United Kingdom, as the Kia Mentor. It was similar in size to best-selling European small family cars like the Ford Escort, but was priced similarly to smaller cars like the Ford Fiesta. Its key rivals in Europe were budget-priced Eastern European and Far Eastern imported products including the Daewoo Nexia, Hyundai Accent, Proton Persona and Skoda Felicia. In Brazil, the car went on the market in March 1994. It was only offered with the 1.5-liter twin cam engine with 112 PS (82 kW) and was considered a competitor to the domestically built Chevrolet Omega and Volkswagen Santana. To make a car suitable for the Brazilian market, Kia went through the trouble of studying Brazilian road surfacing and importing 1,000 litres (260 US gal) of Brazilian gasoline to properly program the engine management.

Kia presented a conceptual convertible version of the first generation Sephia, which was named "Kia Sephia Cabrio" at some auto shows.

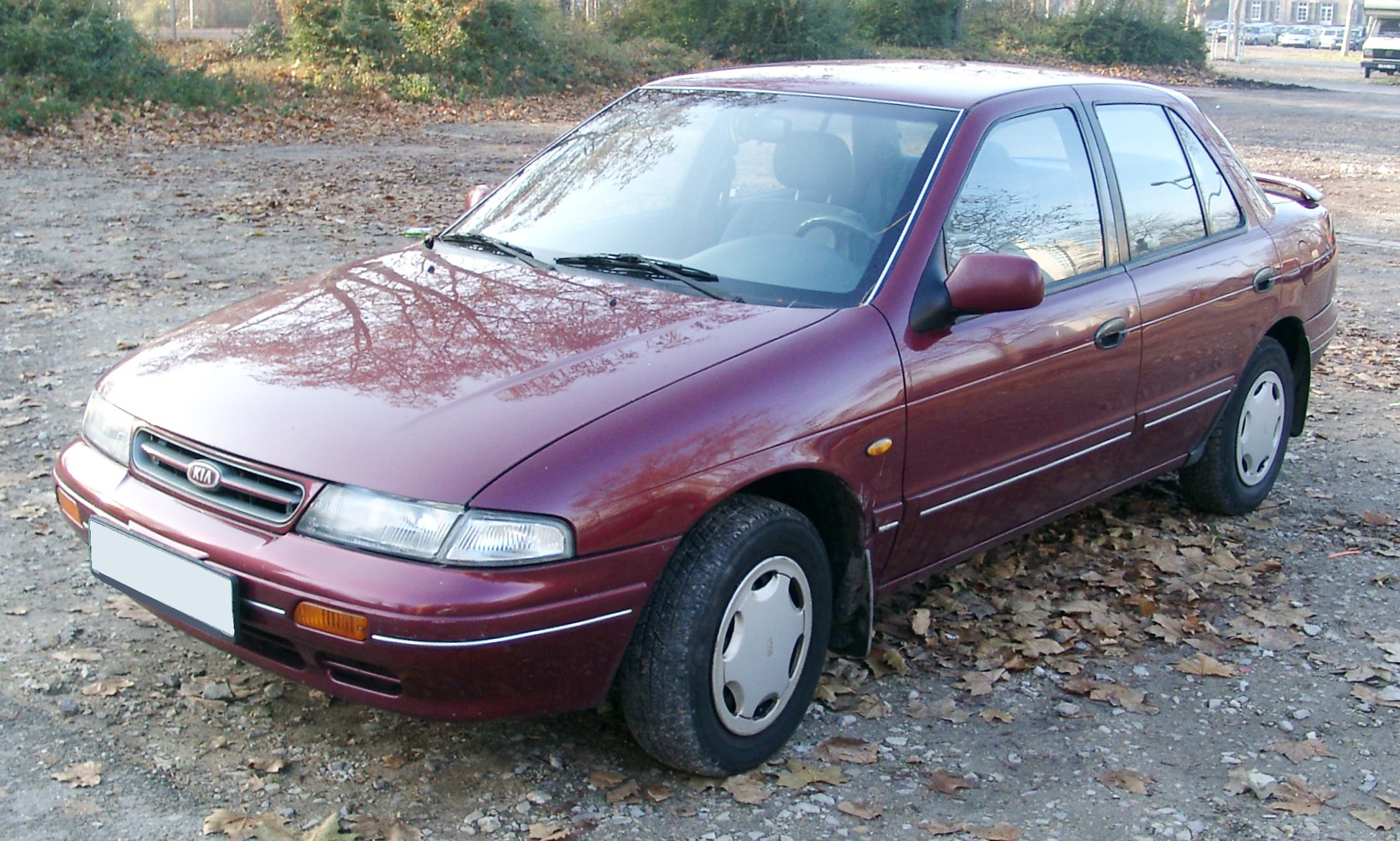
1992–1994 Kia Sephia GTX sedan (Germany)

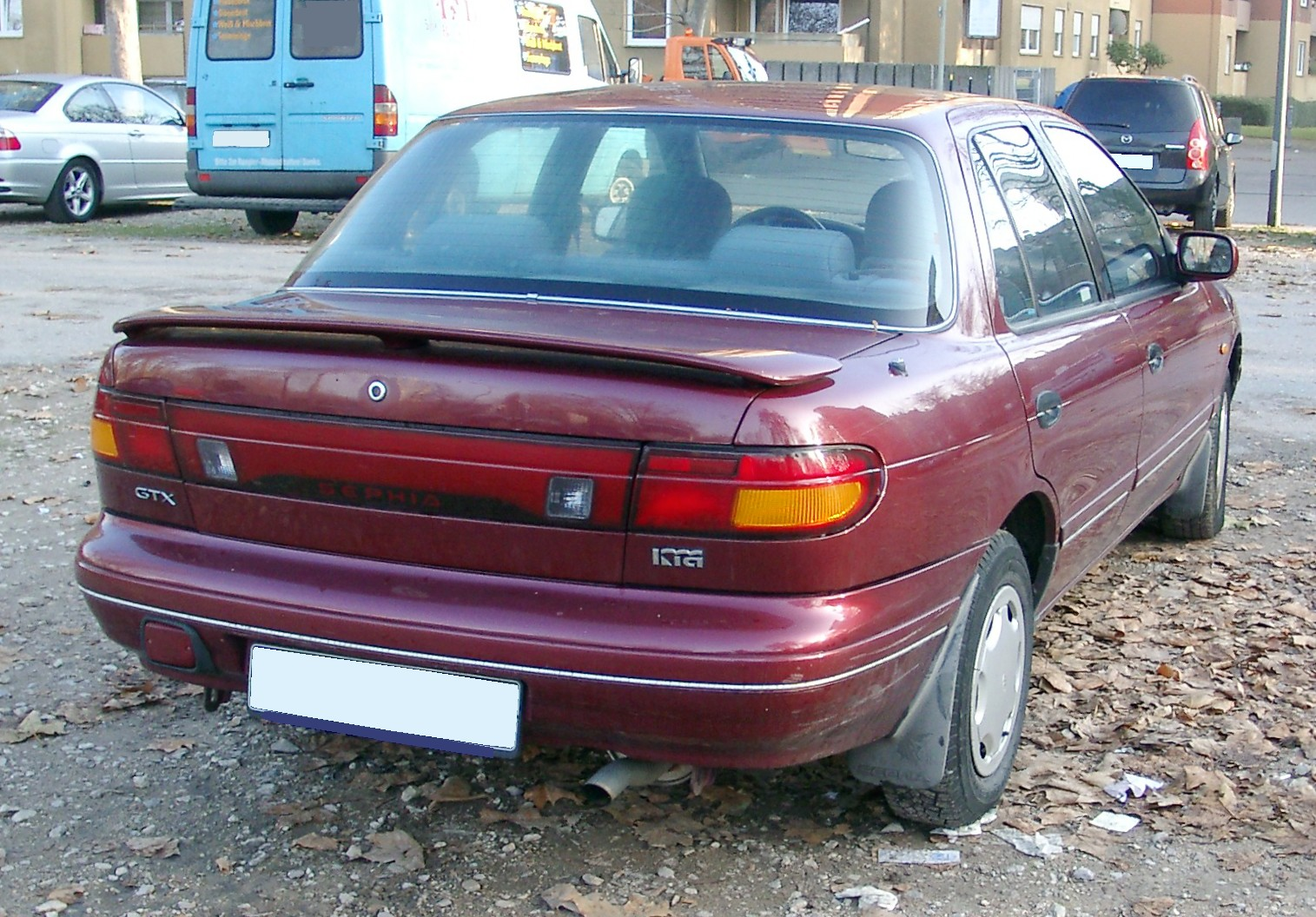
1992–1994 Kia Sephia GTX sedan (Germany)

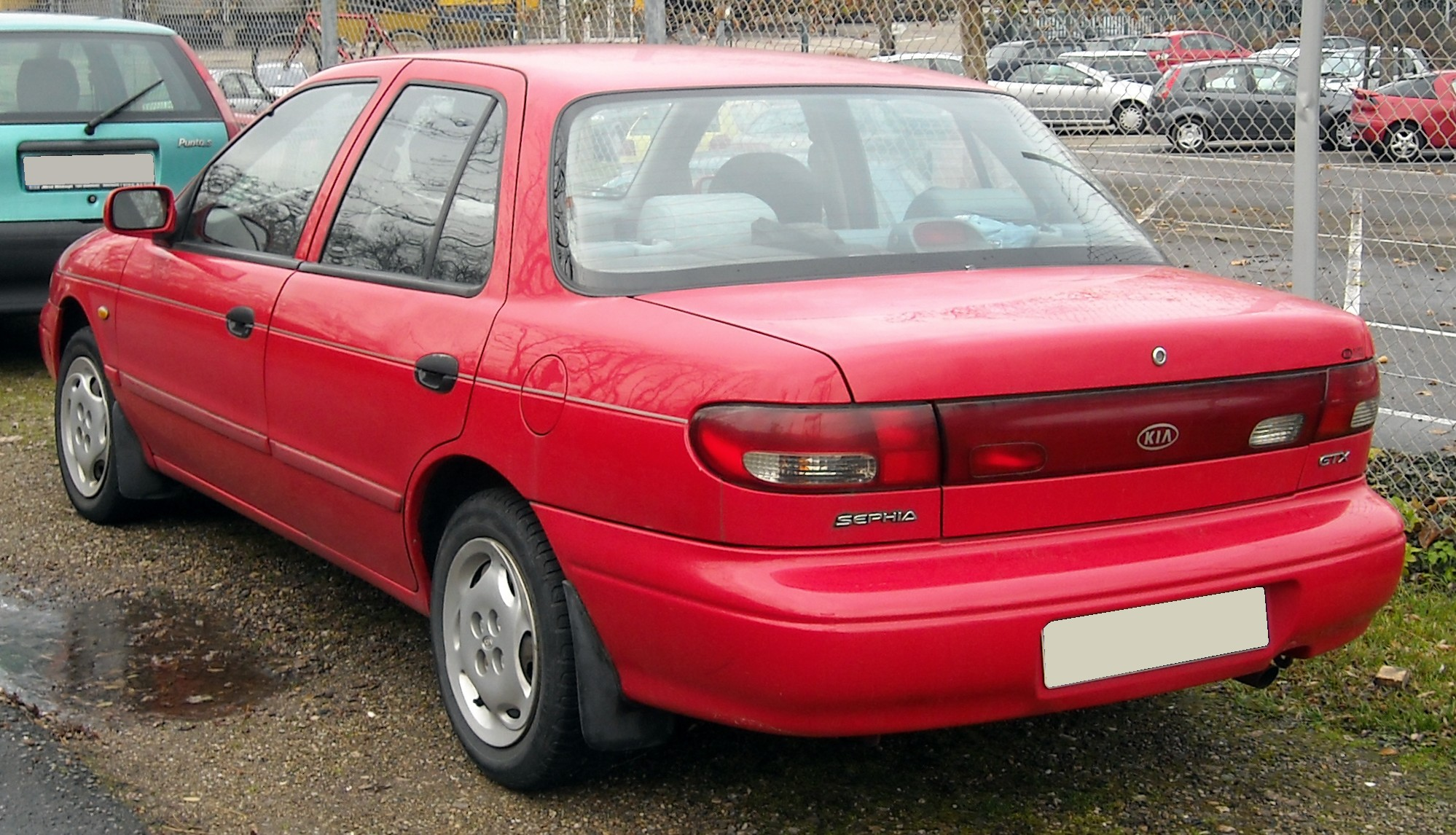
1994–1997 Kia Sephia GTX sedan (Germany)

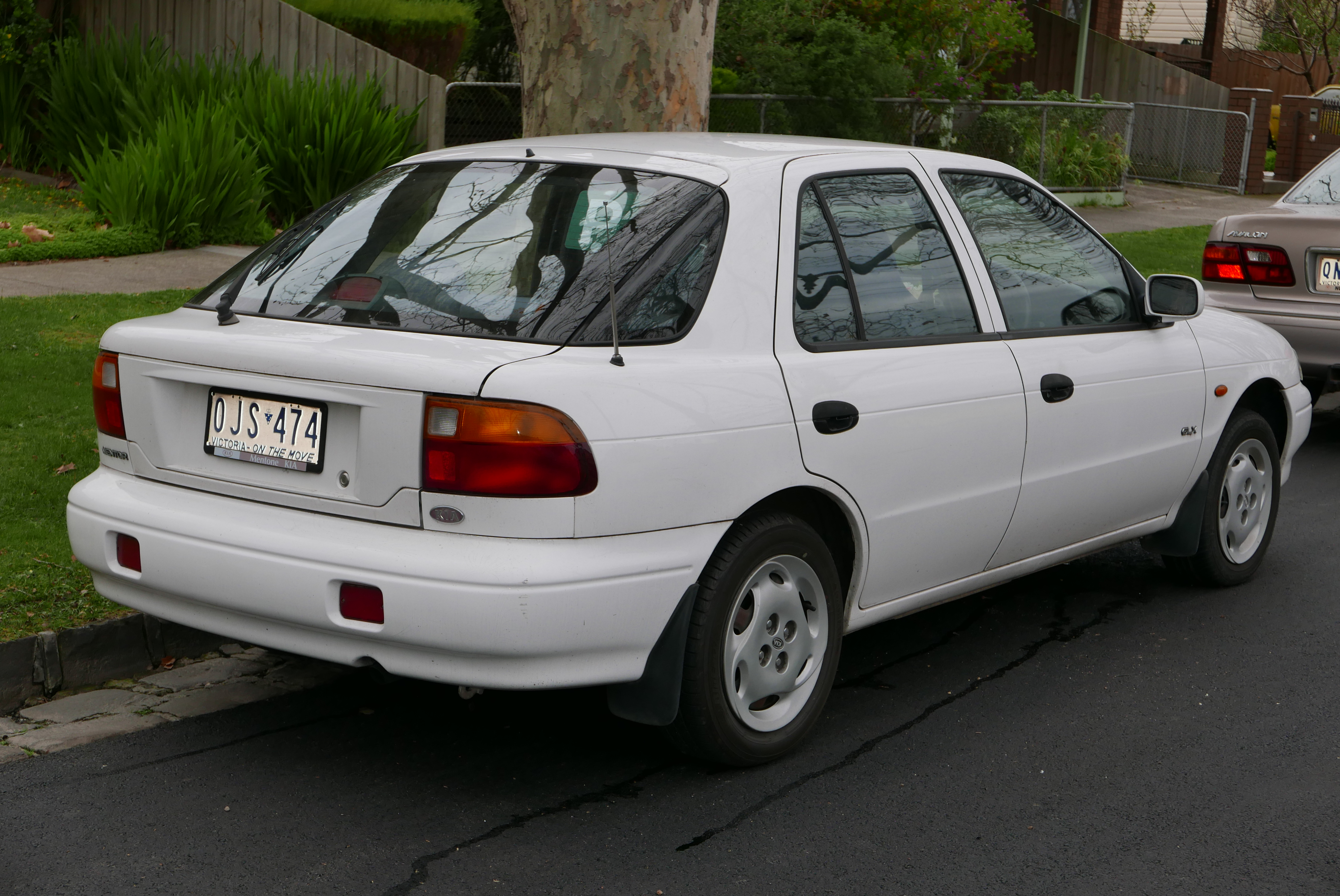
1994–1997 Kia Mentor GLX Liftback (Australia)

=== Timor S5 series ===
The Sephia was sold in Indonesia as the Timor S5 since 1996. It was sold by PT Timor Putra Nasional which was intended to be the national carmaker of Indonesia. Due to Timor's status as a national carmaker, the Timor S5 was exempt from taxes and duties levied on other cars sold in the country despite being imported from South Korea. As the result, Timor S5 was sold at half the price of a comparable Toyota Corolla.

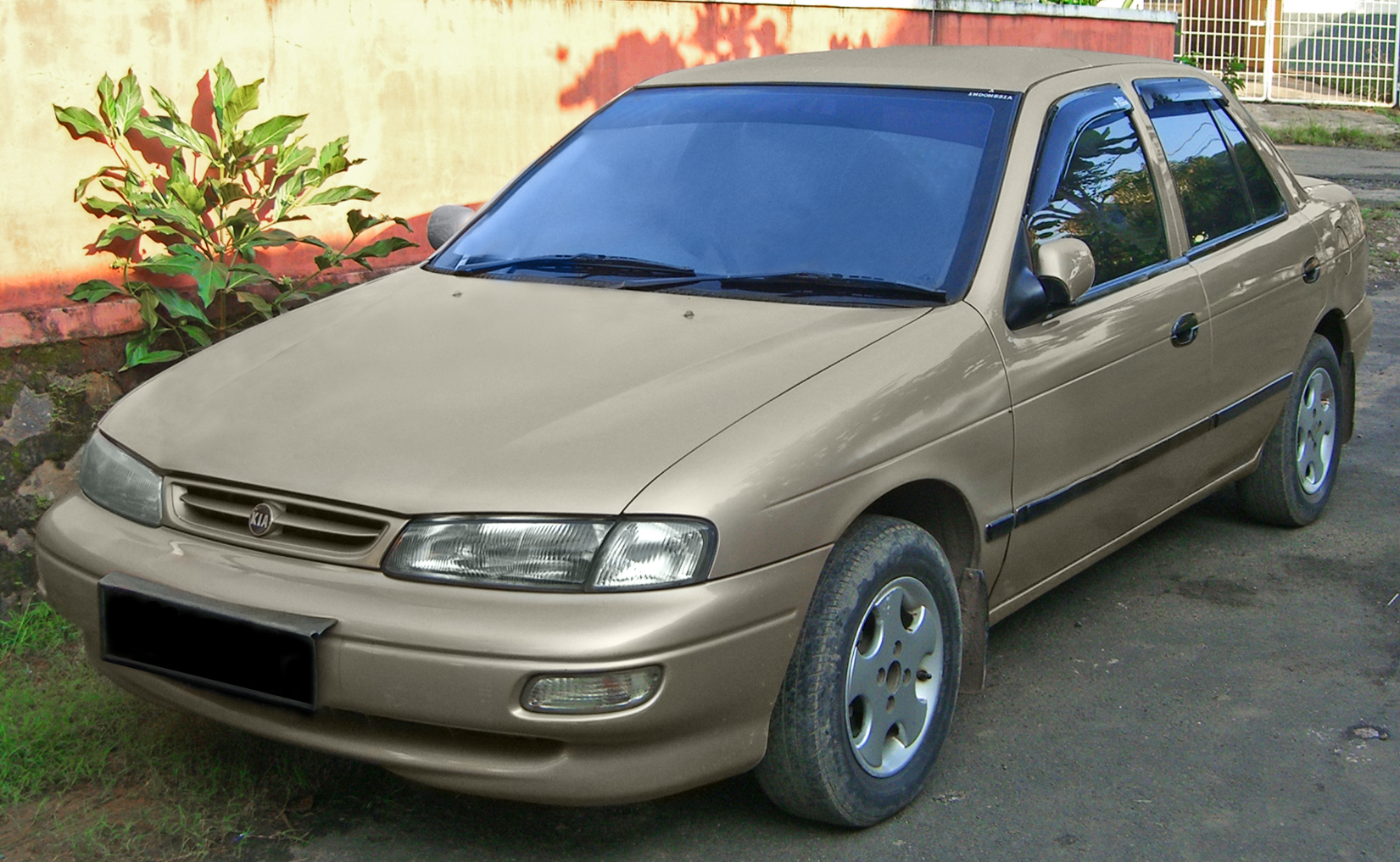
Timor S515 with its Timor badge swapped to Kia

The Timor S5 range consisted of the "S515" (SOHC carbureted), "S515i" (DOHC, fuel injected), and "S516i LE" (sports-oriented limited edition, licensed by Prodrive). Timor also had produced the "SW516i" station wagon and a "SL516i" limousine in a limited number.

The Timor S5 was briefly assembled locally at the Timor assembly plant in Purwakarta, West Java with imported parts in 1998 before its discontinuation due to WTO disputes. Sales continued up to 2007, using inventory from vehicles produced up to 1998.

== Second generation (1997) ==
Second generation
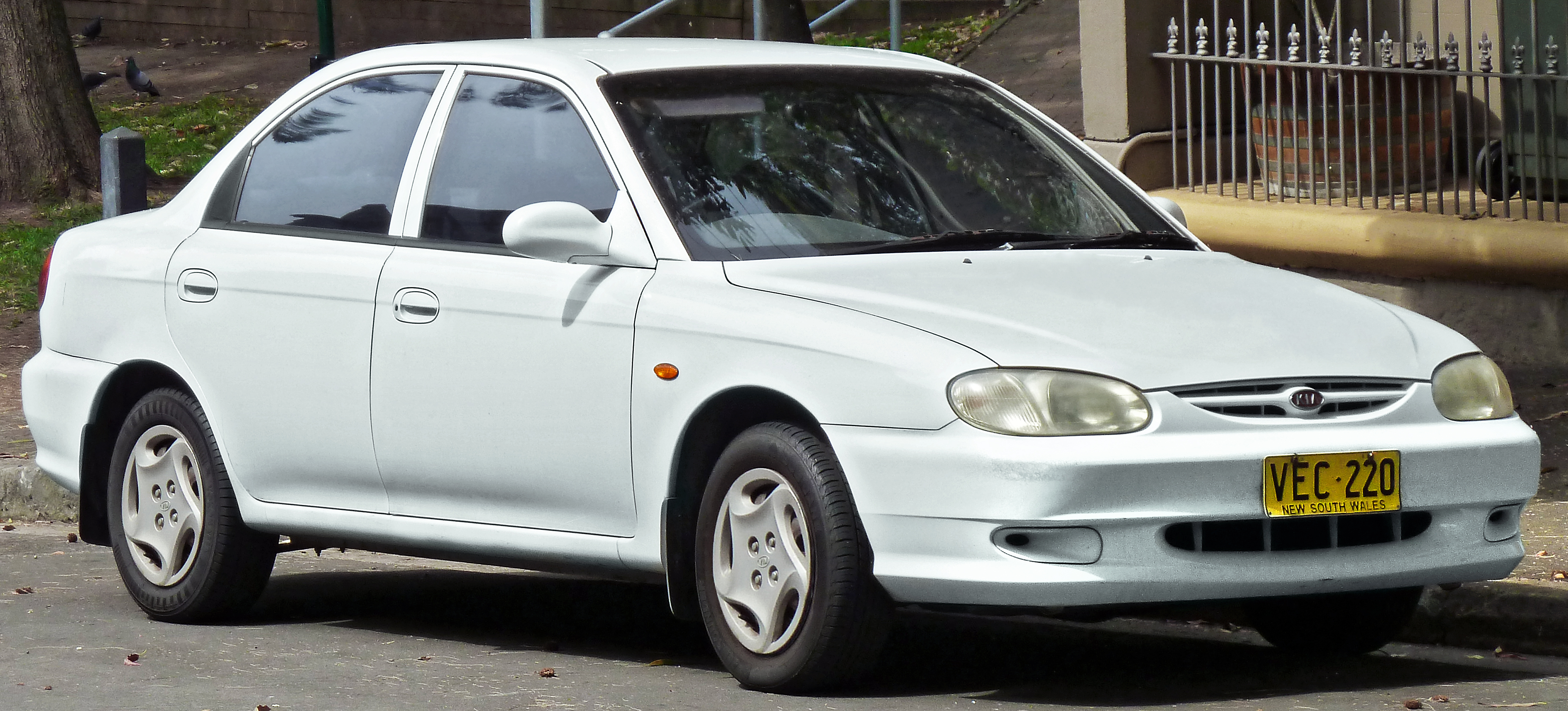
- 1998–2000 Kia Mentor GLX sedan (Australia)

Overview
- Also called: Kia Mentor; Kia Shuma; Kia Spectra
- Production: 1997–2003; 1997–2004 (export)
- Model years: 1998–2001 (Sephia); 2000–2004 (Spectra)
- Assembly: South Korea: Hwaseong (Hwaseong Plant); Egypt: Cairo (AAV); Indonesia: Cikampek; Malaysia: Gurun (NAM); Malaysia: Pekan (AMM); Russia: Izhevsk (IzhAvto); Pakistan: Sujawal (Dewan Farooque Motors)

Body and chassis
- Body style: 4-door sedan 5-door liftback
- Related: Kia Carens (RS)

Powertrain
- Engine: 1.5 L B5-DE I4 (gasoline); 1.6 L B6 I4 (gasoline); 1.8 L T8D I4 (gasoline)
- Transmission: 4-speed F4A-EL automatic; 5-speed G5M manual

Dimensions
- Wheelbase: 2,560 mm (100.8 in)
- Length: Sedan (1997): 4,530 mm (178.3 in); Sedan (2001): 4,510 mm (177.6 in); Liftback: 4,525 mm (178.1 in)
- Width: Sedan: 1,700 mm (66.9 in); Liftback: 1,725 mm (67.9 in)
- Height: Sedan: 1,410 mm (55.5 in); Liftback: 1,425 mm (56.1 in)

In 1997, the Sephia was completely redesigned as a four-door sedan and five-door liftback, this time in-house by Kia itself with help from Mazda. Kia used a DOHC 1.5-liter and its own new DOHC 1.8-liter engine (the T8D engine, originally developed for the Kia Elan) and an improved air conditioning system. In South Korea, the Sephia label was retired in 2000 and replaced by the Spectra. The Sephia production totals were 628,168.

The North American market received the Sephia sedan for the 1998 model year. For the 2000 model year, the liftback variant was launched, sold under the name "Kia Spectra". The Sephia (sedan) and Spectra (liftback) continued to be sold alongside one another until the 2002 model year updates were introduced. As part of this update, both body variants were facelifted, and the range was rationalized under the single "Kia Spectra" name. Three trim levels were available in the US: an entry-level "S", slightly upgraded "GS", and the top-of-the-range "GSX".

Arab American Vehicles (AAV) manufactured the Spectra in Cairo, Egypt, circa 2002. In Russia production of the Spectra continued until 2011, produced by Izh-Avto. The Spectra liftback was also assembled in Malaysia between 2001 and 2010. Production began at the HICOM AMM plant in Pekan, and was later transferred to Naza's NAM plant in Gurun.

=== Australia ===
The second generation Sephia sedan and liftback were badged "Mentor" in Australia when released in May 1998. Kia offered an entry-level "SLX" with the 1.5-liter inline-four engine, standard with five-speed manual transmission or optional four-speed automatic, and equipped with power steering, air conditioning, and cloth trim. The higher-specification "GLX" added central locking, power windows and mirrors, more upmarket trim, plus the option of the larger 1.8-liter engine on the liftback variant.

From June 2000, following the change of distributor in Australia to Ateco, Kia discontinued the sedan variant and rebadged the liftback "Shuma". Along with the sedan, Kia dispensed with the 1.5-liter engine and SLX/GLX model identifiers. In their place, Kia offered an entry-level "Shuma" and a limited edition "Shuma FX", which added alloy wheels, central locking, power windows and mirrors, improved audio and higher-grade trim to the base model's air-conditioning and power steering. The Shuma also benefited from a minor facelift, which changed the tail-lamp lenses, wheels and interior trimmings.

When the car was facelifted once more in May 2001, Kia rebranded it once more to "Spectra". This update brought redesigned headlights, a new front bumper, adjustments to suspension calibration, and an overhauled four-speed automatic. Equipment-wise, the single-specification "LS" offered a driver's airbag, seatbelt pretensioners and immobiliser were added, along with standard powered mirrors and windows and a host of minor trim upgrades. Kia Australia discontinued the Spectra in 2004.

Sedan
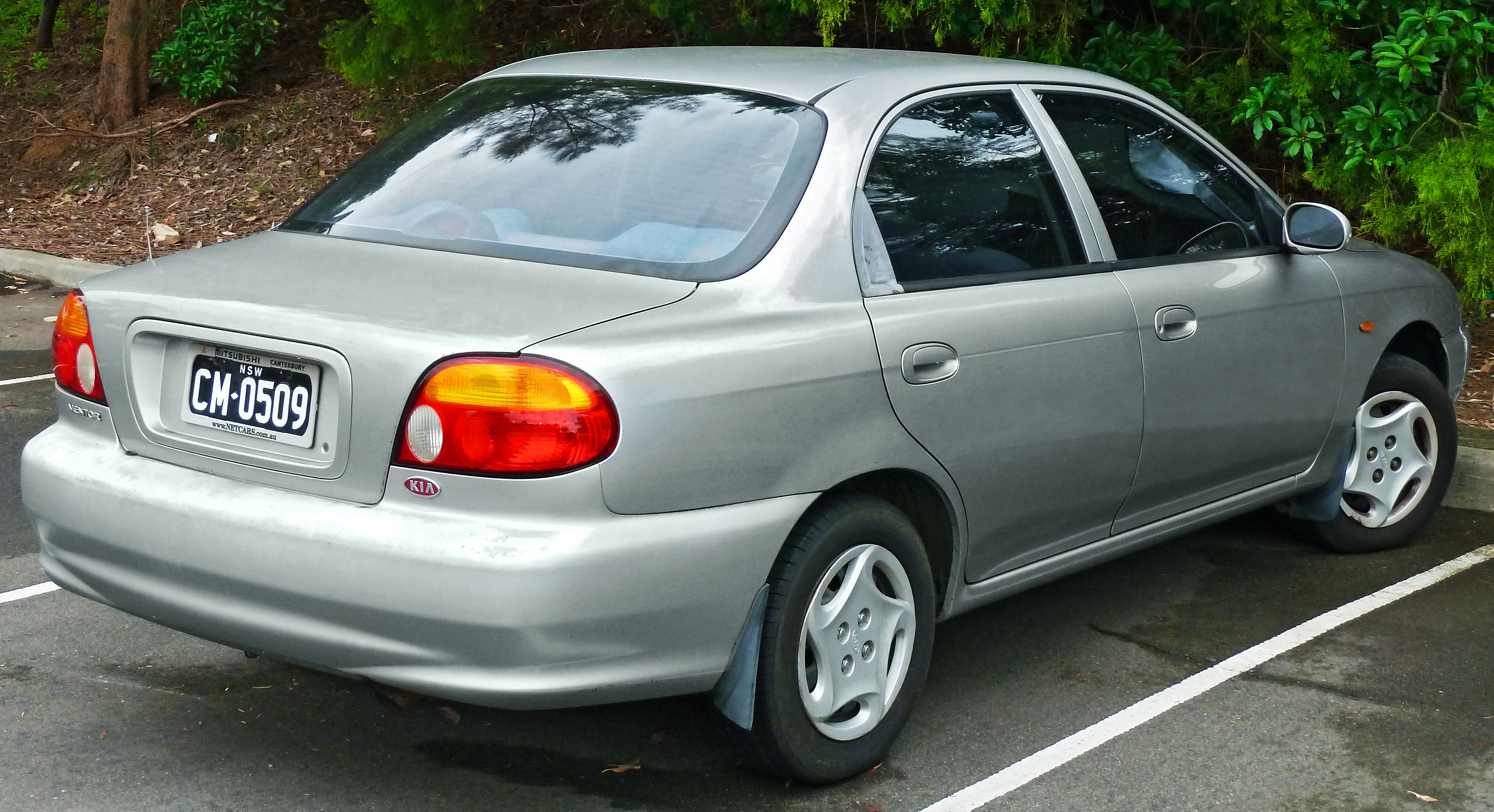
Pre-facelift Kia Mentor GLX (Australia)

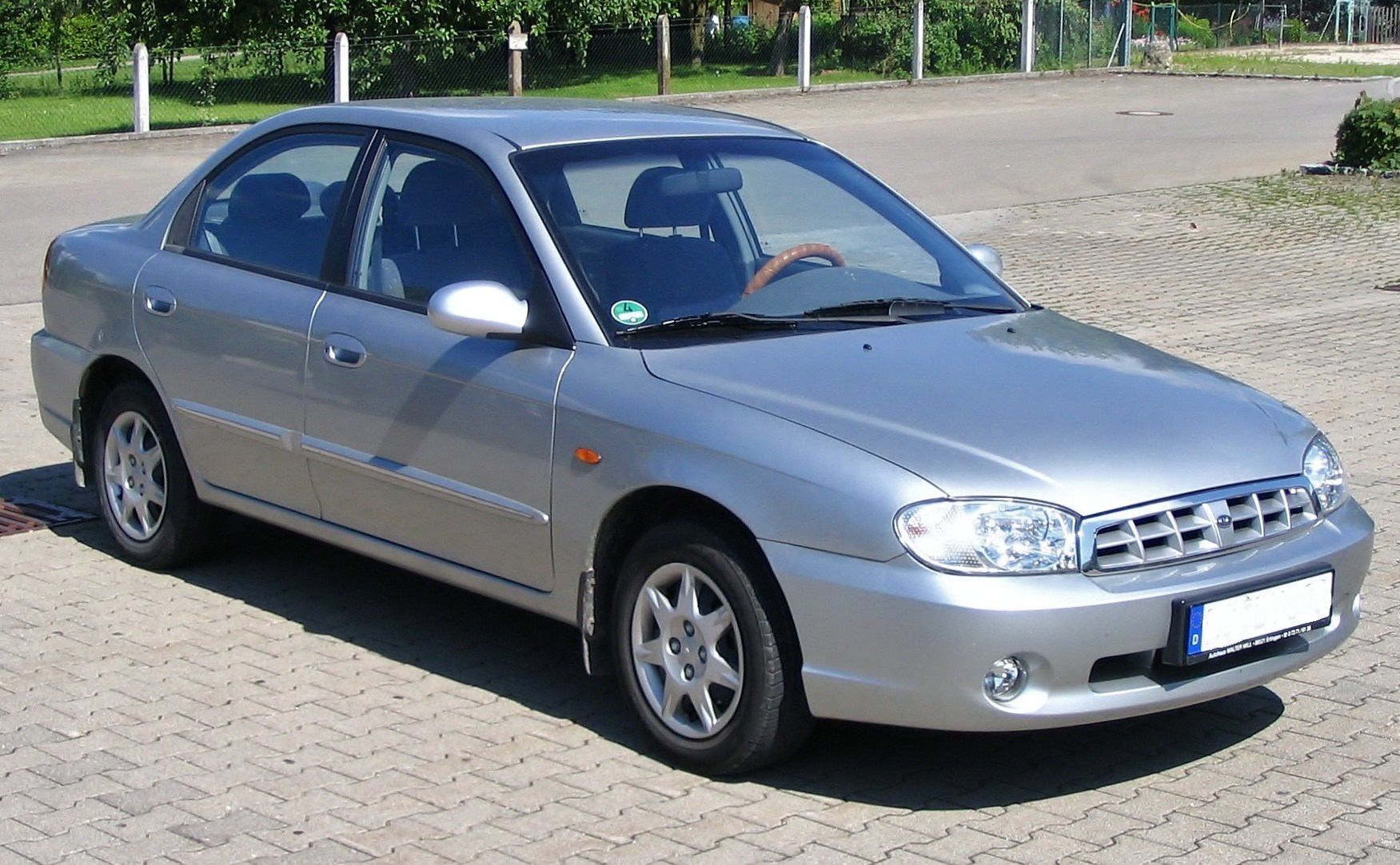
Facelift Kia Shuma (Germany)

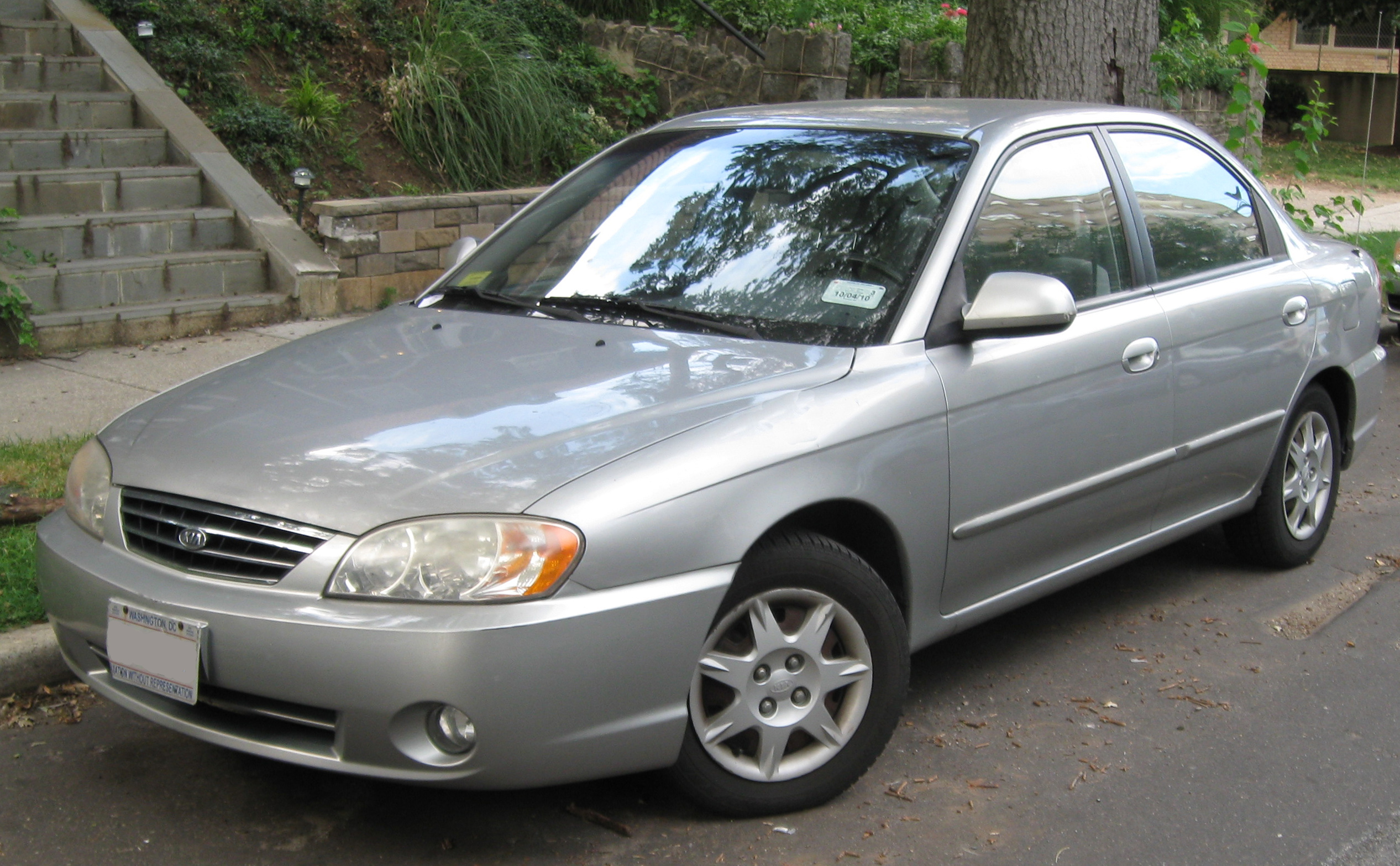
Facelift Kia Spectra (U.S.)

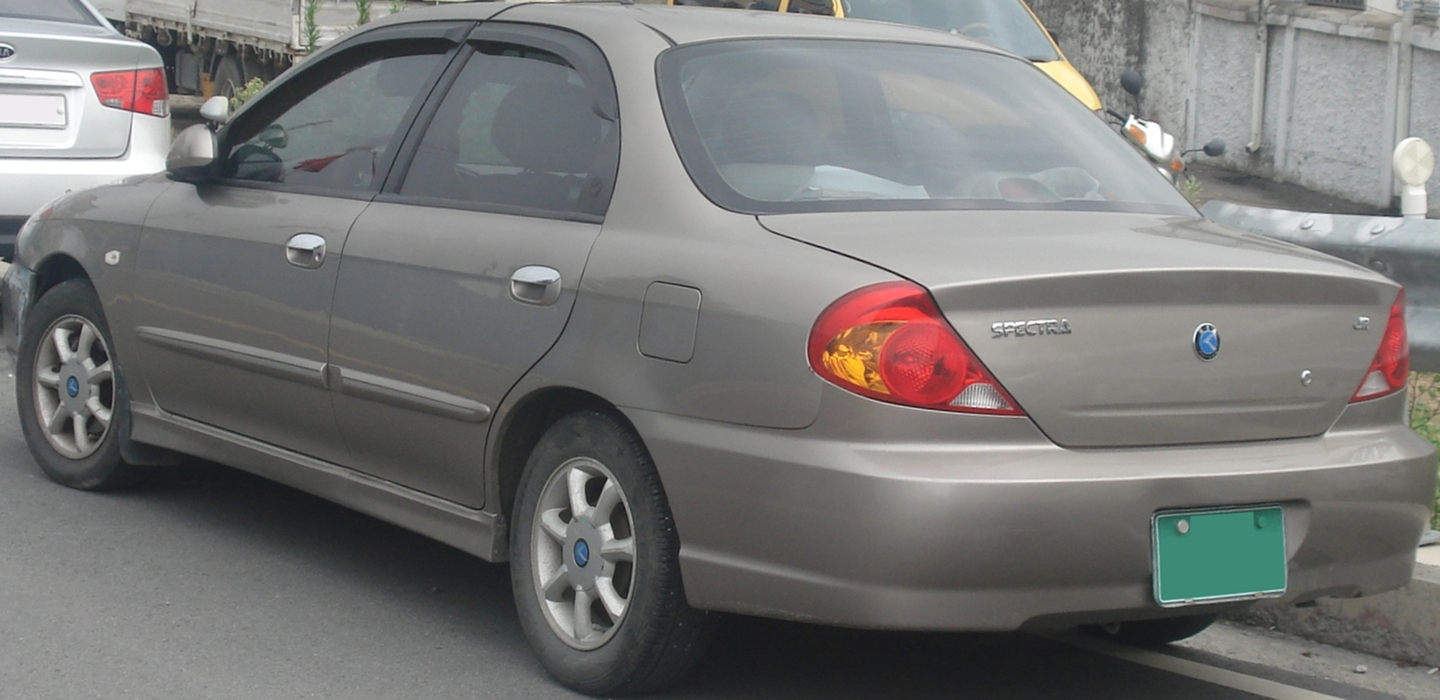
Facelift Kia Spectra (South Korea)
Liftback
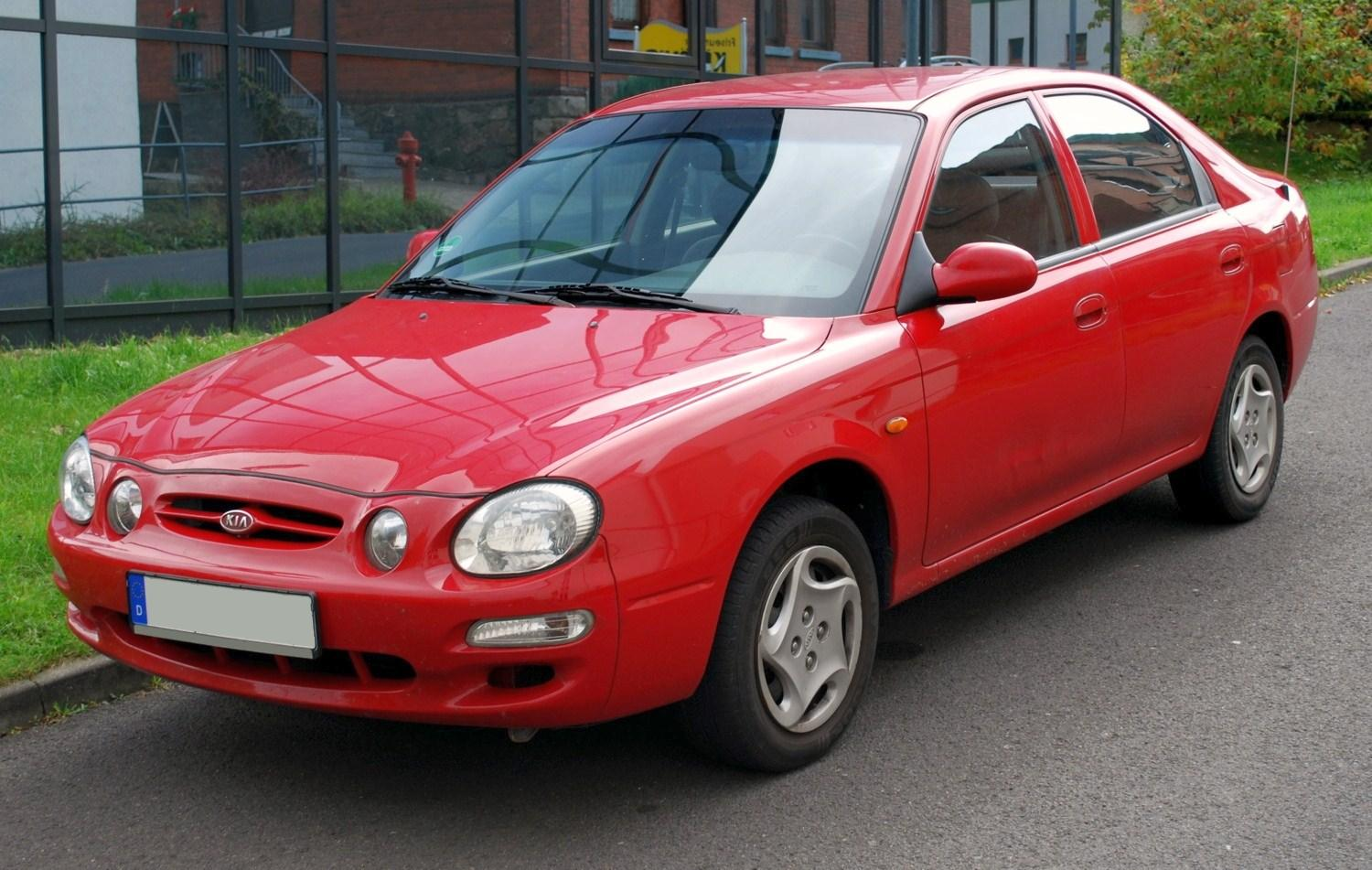
Pre-facelift Kia Shuma (Germany)

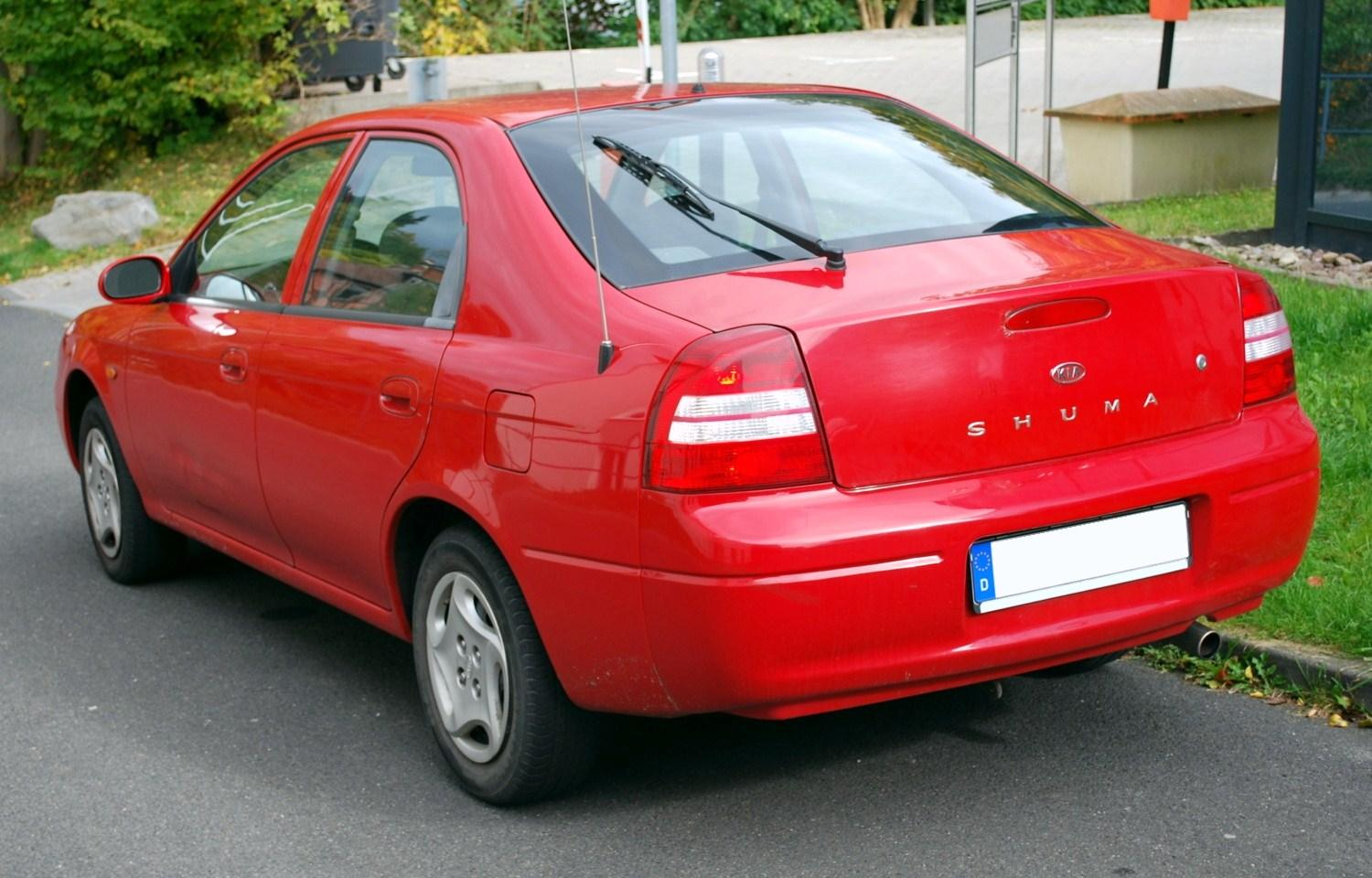
Pre-facelift Kia Shuma (Germany)

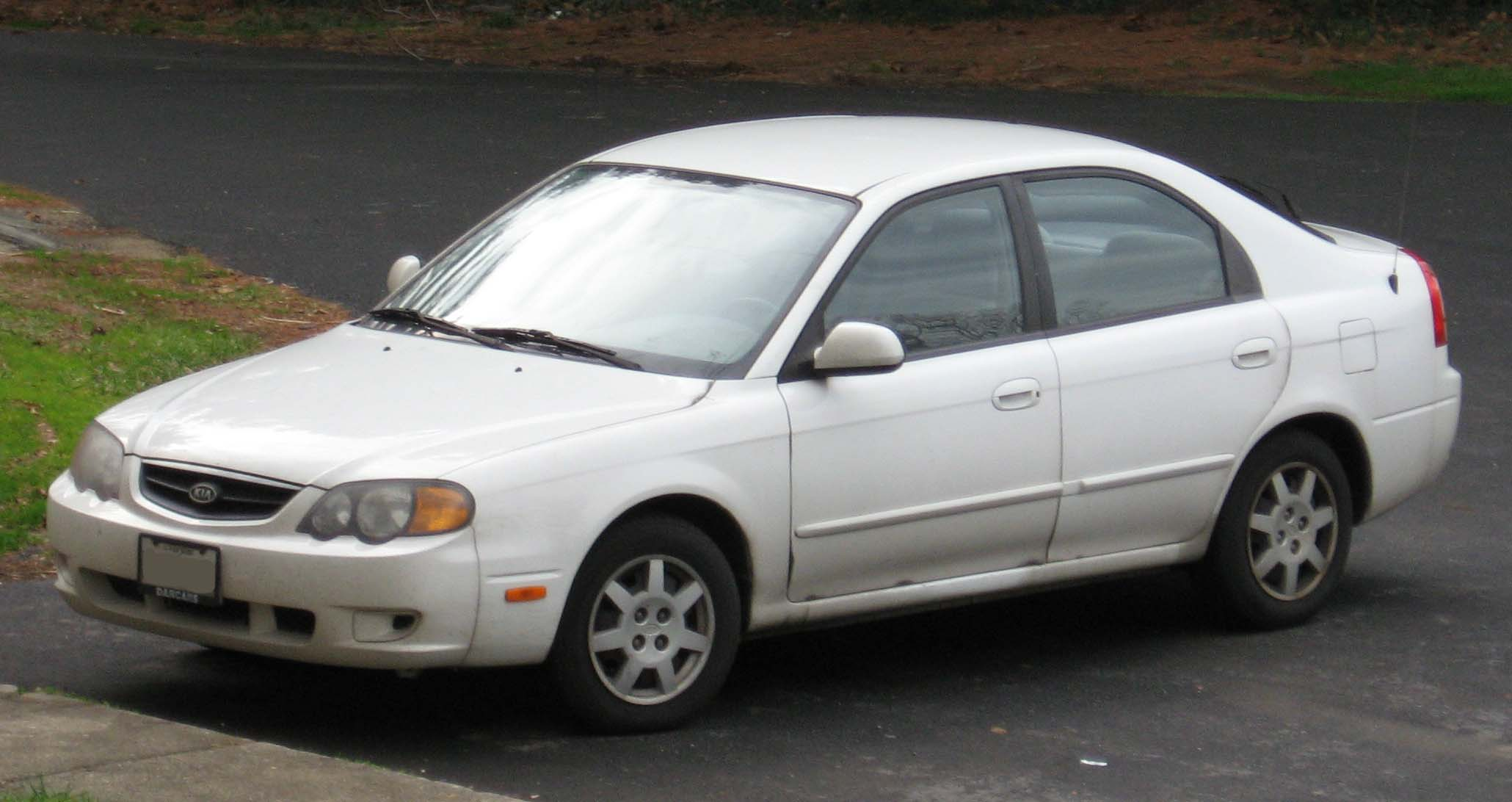
Facelift Kia Spectra (U.S.)

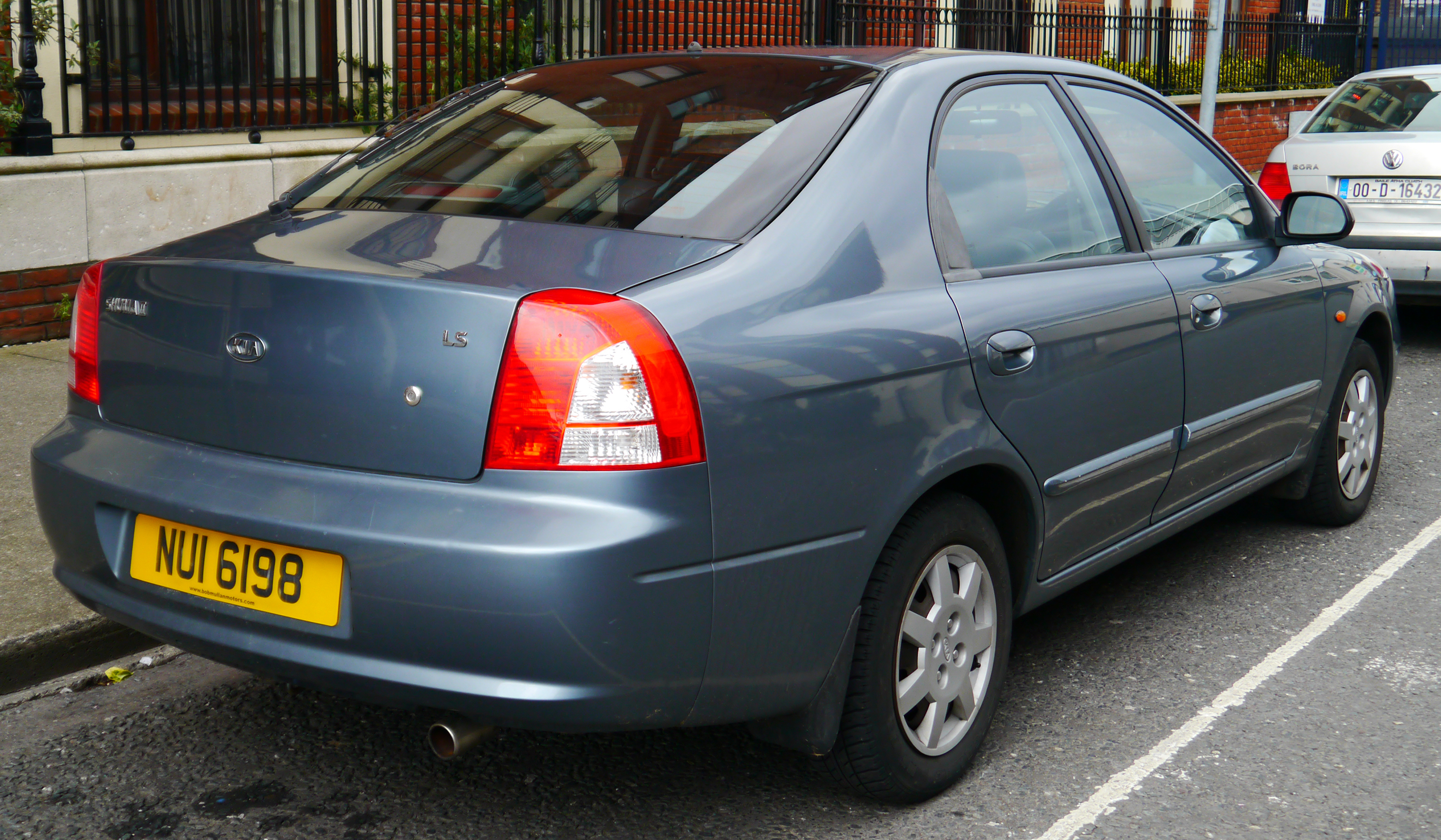
Facelift Kia Shuma LS (Ireland)

== Other versions ==
=== Latin America (LD; 2003–2005) ===
Although the Sephia's successor, the Kia Cerato, was released in 2003, this replacement vehicle was still named Sephia for Latin America until 2005, when it was discontinued in favor of the name Spectra, as used in North America.

=== Sephia Taxi (DC; 2003–2022) ===
Some models of the first generation Kia Rio were sold in certain countries of South America, such like Colombia, as "Sephia Taxi" already prepared with the legal requirements to work as Taxi cabs, including the yellow body paint. The Sephia Taxi came with the smaller displacement engine for that body (1.4-liter) and manual transmission.

=== Sephia Taxi (JB; 2005–2011) ===
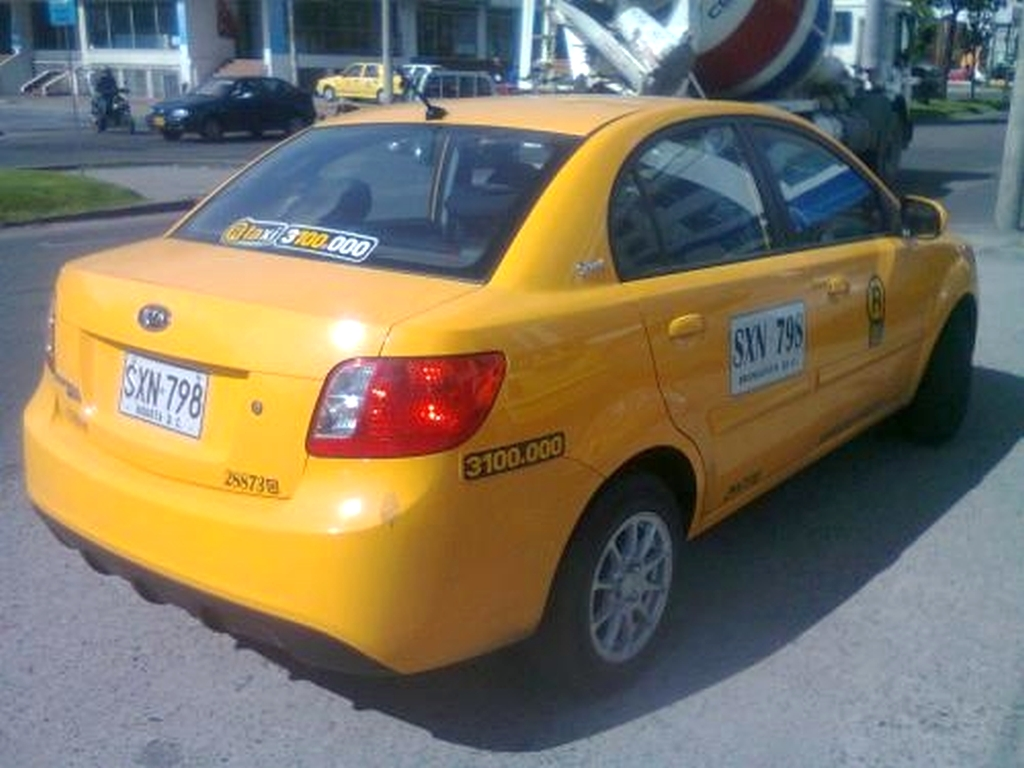
Kia Sephia Taxi (JB)

The second generation Kia Rio also sold in certain countries of South America as "Sephia Taxi".

=== Grand Sephia (RD; 2008–2012) ===
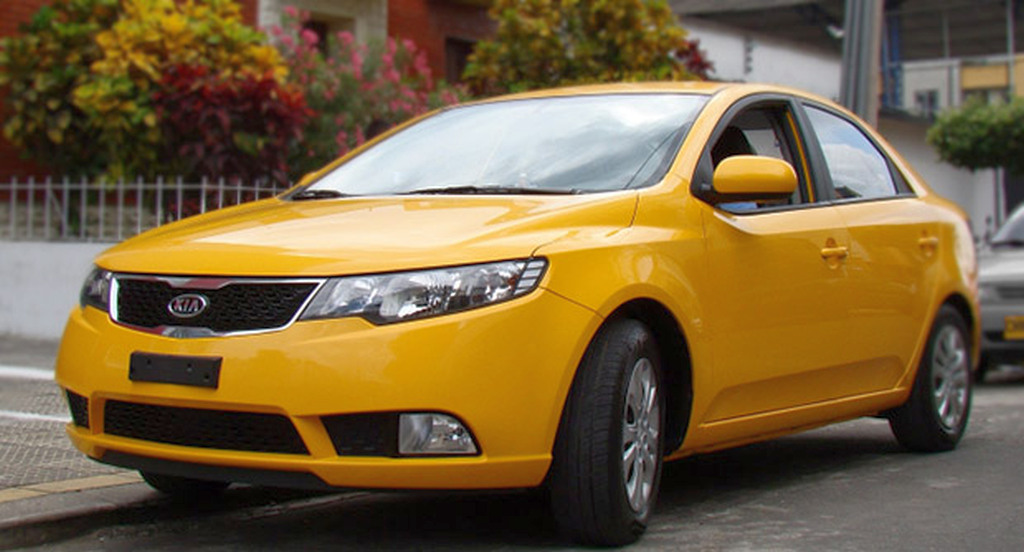
Kia Grand Sephia Taxi (TD)

Some models of the Kia Forte, were also prepared to be sold as taxi cabs for certain countries of Latin America. The Grand Sephia has the smaller displacement engine available for that body (1.6-liter), and manual transmission.

=== Sephia Taxi (2020–present) ===
The Sephia nameplate once again is used as a taxi nameplate in Colombia, this time it is based on the Chinese-built Kia Pegas/Soluto.
