= Timir =

Timir may refer to:

- Timir Biswas (born 1982) Indian singer in Bengali and Hindi
- Timir Chanda (born 1978) Indian cricketer
- Timir Pinegin (1927-2013) Russian-Soviet sailor
- Timir mine, Sakha, Russia; an iron mine
- HD 148427 (star), constellation Ophiuchus; a K-type subgiant star; named after the Bengali term for darkness

== See also ==
- Timur (disambiguation)
