= Demirović =

Demirović (Bosnian pronunciation: [děmiroʋitɕ, demǐː-]; meaning Son of "Demir") is a Bosnian surname. Notable people with the surname include:

- Alex Demirović, German sociologist
- Andrea Demirović (born 1985), Montenegrin singer
- Elian Demirović (born 2000), Slovenian footballer
- Enes Demirović (born 1972), retired Bosnian footballer
- Ermedin Demirović (born 1998), Bosnian footballer
- Hasan Demirović (1941–42), Mayor of Sarajevo
- Josip Demirović Devj (1939–1999), Croatian painter and sculptor
