= Kia Spectra =

Compact car

The Kia Spectra is a compact car produced by Kia Motors between 2000 and 2009. It took many design components from its predecessor, the Kia Sephia, which ceased production in the year 2000 in most countries. It succeeded the Kia Sephia and it was replaced by the Kia Forte (also known as Kia Cerato in some markets).

== First generation ==
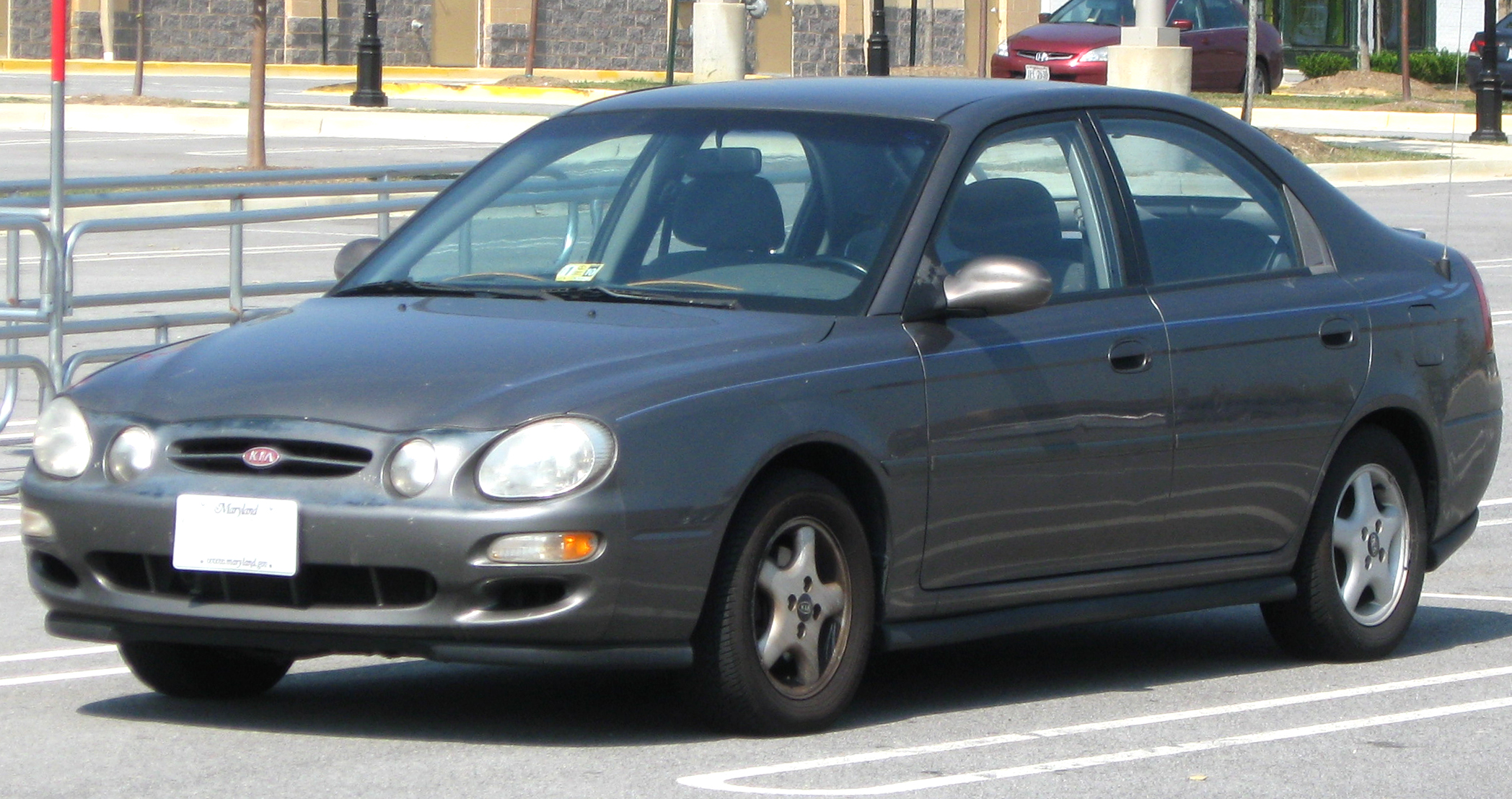
Sedan: 2000–2001

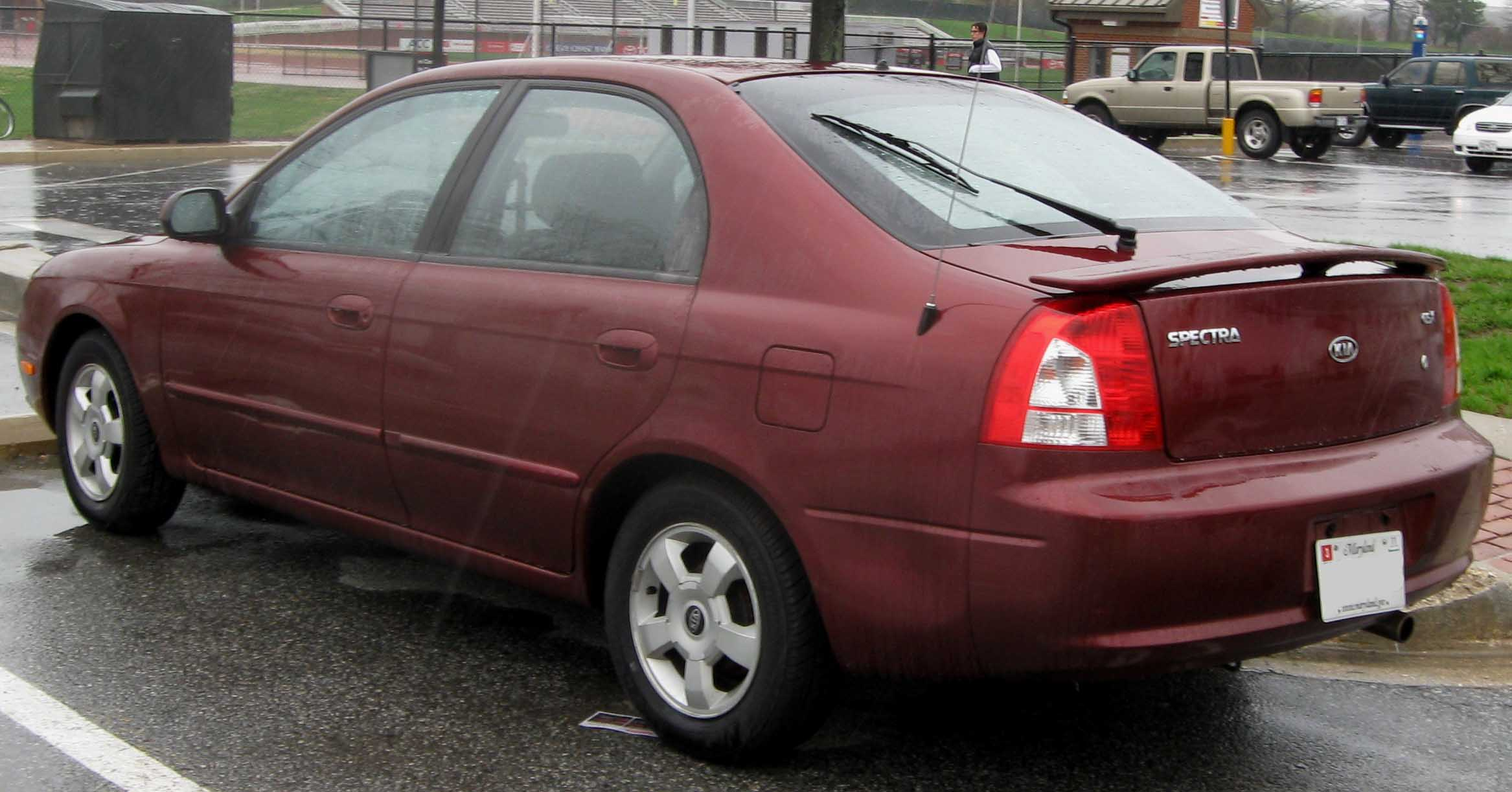
Sedan: 2001–2003

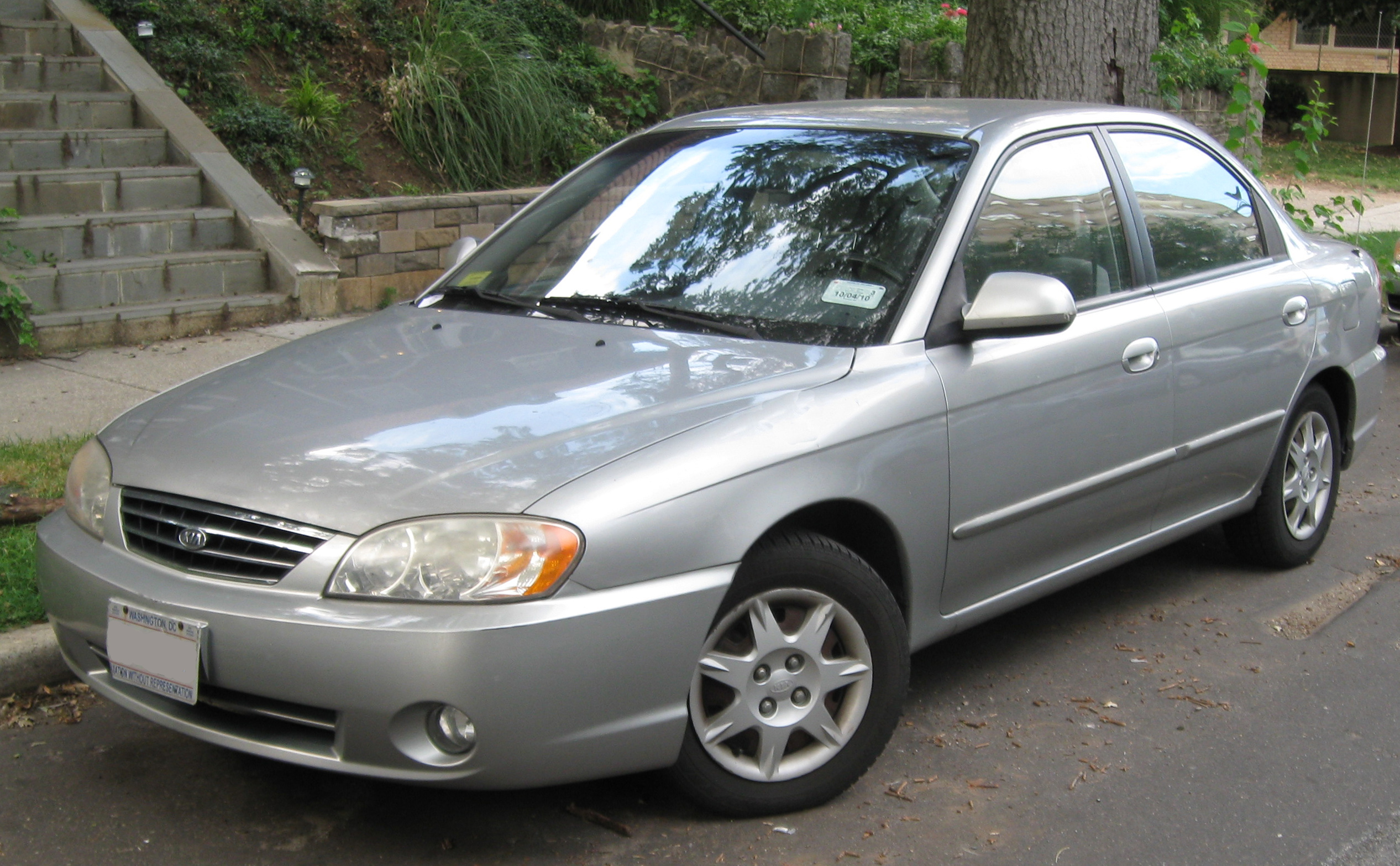
Sedan: 2001–2003

The Kia Spectra was introduced as a front-engine, front-wheel-drive subcompact sedan. It was designed for affordability and versatility to make the most of the rather small amount of space it had to offer.

It was equipped with a 125 horsepower 1.8l DOHC four cylinder engine paired to either a 5-speed manual or 4-speed automatic transmission.

This generation came in three variants: G, GX, and GX-S. It offered a quiet interior, smooth ride quality, and high-end materials for its price. Despite having good sales, this generation only lasted for two years before undergoing a redesign.

In 2001 the Spectra received a slight facelift regarding the aesthetics of the vehicle.

== Second generation ==
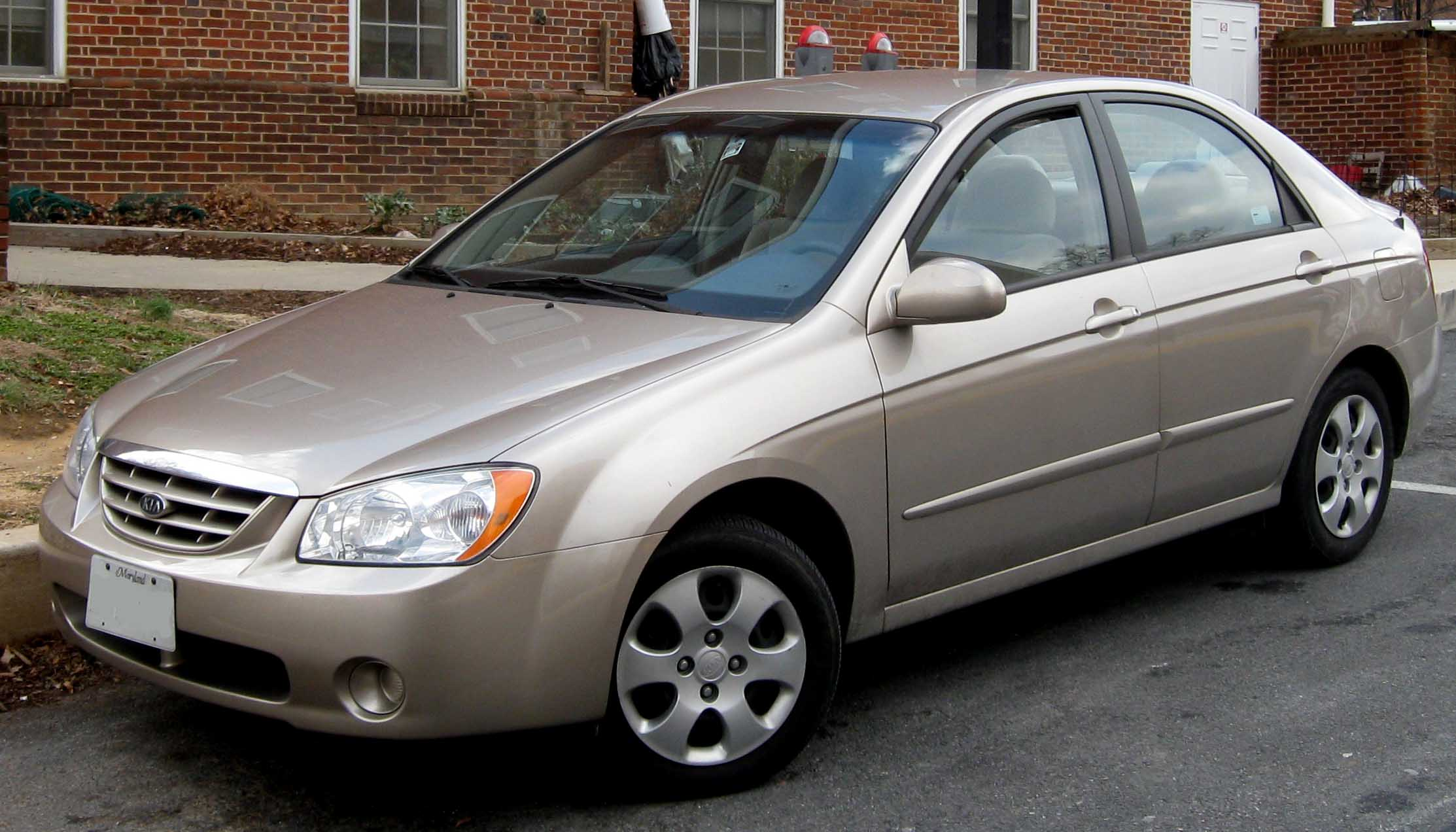
2004–2006

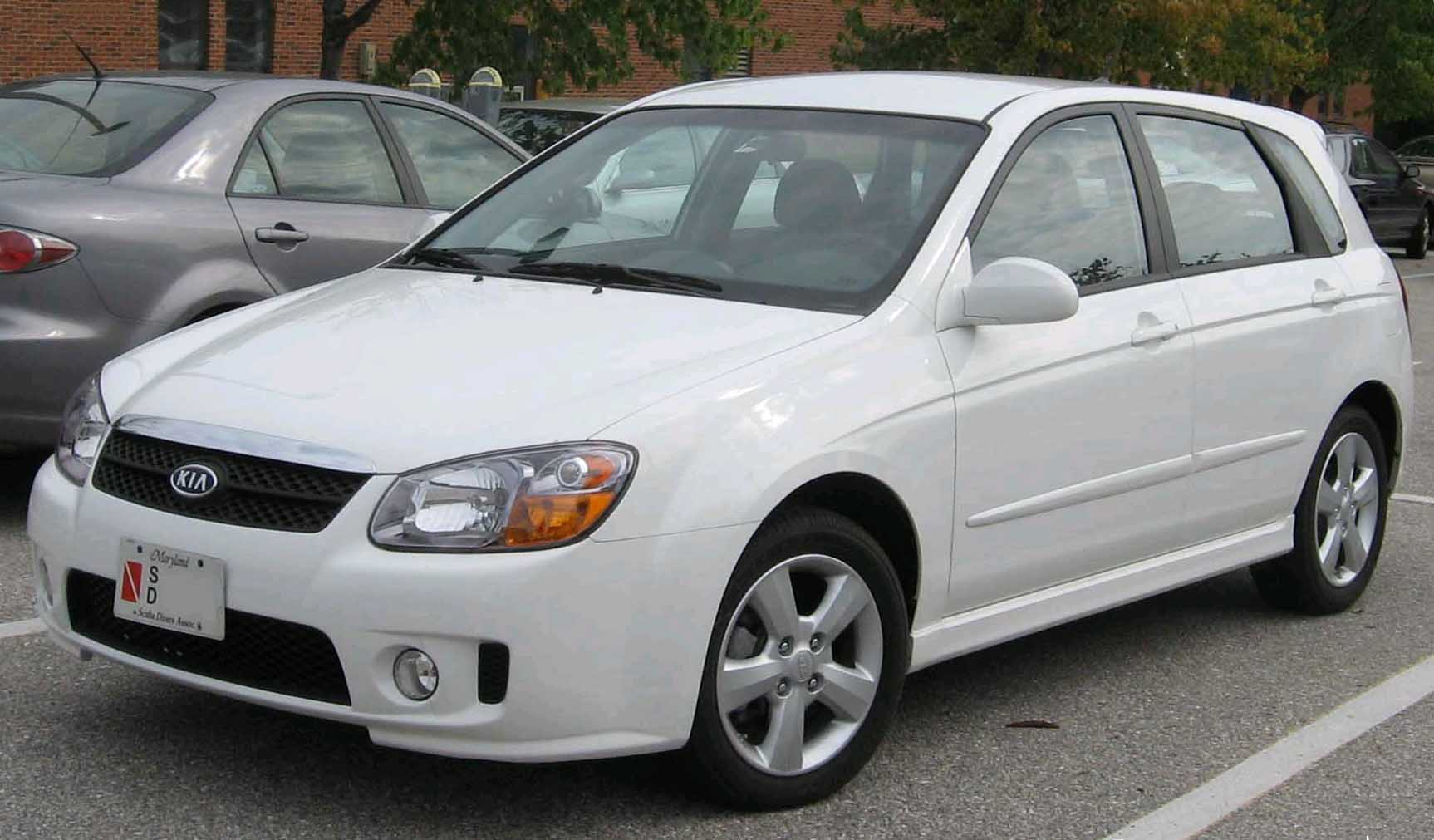
2007–2009

The second generation Kia Spectra, introduced in 2005, expanded upon its predecessor by updating the body styling, adding more power, and improving on functionality.

The engine used during this generation was Hyundai's 2.0l DOHC four cylinder engine dual CVVT(Beta II), producing 138 horsepower and 136 lb-ft of torque, up from the previous 125 horsepower and 108 lb-ft of torque. The transmission options remained the same.

Like the previous years, it offered three trim levels but with different lettering: EX, LX, and SX. The EX was the most basic, the LX added several luxury options, and the SX contributed to more sporty styling.

== Russian edition ==
Years of production: 2000–2011 More
