= Zeki Demir =

Turkish karateka (born 1982)

- Born: June 6, 1982 (age 43); Istanbul, Turkey
- Nationality: Turkish
- Division: -80 kg
- Style: Karate Kumite
- Team: Istanbul BB SK
- Last updated on: May 13, 2013

Zeki Demir
Medal record

Men's Karate

World Championships
| Gold medal – first place | 2008 Tokyo | Kumite team |

European Championships
| Gold medal – first place | 2006 Stevanger | Kumite -80 kg |
| Gold medal – first place | 2006 Stevanger | Kumite team |

Zeki Demir (born June 6, 1982 in Istanbul, Turkey) is a European champion Turkish karateka competing in the kumite -80 kg division. He is a member of the İstanbul Büyükşehir Belediyesi S.K.

His younger brother İdris Demir is also a national karateka competing in the kumite -65 kg weight class.

== Achievements ==
2008

- Gold 19th World Championships - November 13, Tokyo JPN - kumite team

2006

- Gold 41st European Championships - May 5, Stevanger NOR - kumite -80 kg
- Gold 41st European Championships - May 5, Stevanger NOR - kumite team

2004

- Silver 11th Balkan Senior Karate Championships - March 13 - kumite team

2002

- Silver 9th Balkan Senior Karate Championships - September 28 - kumite -70 kg
- Gold 29th European Karate Cadet & Junior Championships - February 15 - kumite junior -70 kg

2001

- Gold 2nd World Karate Cadet & Junior Championships - October 12 - kumite junior team
