= Temir (disambiguation) =

Temir may refer to:

- Khan Temir (before 1594–1637), khan of the Budjak Horde
- Temir Sariyev (born 1963), Kyrgyz politician, former Prime Minister of Kyrgyzstan
- Temir, a town in Aktobe Province, Kazakhstan
- Temir District, a district in Aktobe Province, Kazakhstan
- Temir, Kyrgyzstan, a village in Issyk-Kul Region

== See also ==
- Temir-Kanat, a village in Issyk-Kul Region, Kyrgyzstan
- Temir-Khan-Shura, a fortified outpost in Russia, now called Buynaksk
- Temir komuz, a Kirgiz jaw harp
