= Temur Ugulava =

Georgian businessman (1970–2026)

- თემურ უგულავა
- Born: თეიმურაზ უგულავა 31 March 1970; Khoni, Georgia
- Died: 22 June 2026 (aged 56); New York City, U.S.
- Occupation: Businessman
- Years active: 1998–2026
- Organization: Adjara Group
- Known for: Founding Adjara Group; Rooms Hotels; Fabrika; Stamba Hotel

Temur Ugulava (Georgian: თემურ უგულავა; 31 March 1970 – 22 June 2026) was a Georgian businessman, hospitality executive and philanthropist. He was best known as the founder of Adjara Group, one of Georgia's most influential hospitality and urban-development companies. He played a leading role in the transformation of post-Soviet industrial and historic buildings into hotels, cultural venues, and mixed-use urban spaces which contributed to the international promotion of Georgia as a tourism and cultural destination.

== Career ==
Ugulava began his business career in the gaming industry and was among the principal owners of AdjaraBet, founded in 1998. The company's growth provided the capital for his later investments in hospitality, tourism, and real estate. He sold AdjaraBet in 2019.

In 2010, Ugulava founded Adjara Group, which developed and operated a portfolio of hotels, restaurants, and mixed-use urban projects, including Rooms Hotels (Tbilisi, Stepantsminda, and Bakuriani), Stamba Hotel (Tbilisi), and Fabrika Tbilisi. The company also operated Holiday Inn Tbilisi and managed the Tbilisi Sports Palace. Several of these projects involved the adaptive reuse of former industrial or historic buildings. Fabrika Tbilisi, a derelict Soviet-era sewing factory converted into a hostel and cultural-commercial complex, became one of the group's most notable developments. Beyond hospitality, Ugulava's business ventures included Setanta Sports, an international sports broadcaster, the online marketplace Veli Store, the scooter-sharing service Scroll, and Udabno, an agricultural company managing large-scale almond orchards in Georgia.

In 2026, Forbes Georgia ranked Ugulava 41st among the country's 100 wealthiest businesspeople, estimating his net worth at approximately ₾282.5 million (US$107.5 million).

== Death ==
Ugulava died on 22 June 2026, at the age of 56, after undergoing treatment abroad for lung cancer. His death prompted widespread reactions from businesspeople and public figures across Georgia. Adjara Group described his contribution to the country as transformative, stating that his projects reshaped not only Georgia's hospitality industry but also its cultural and social landscape.
