= Mahmut Demir (futsal) =

Turkish-Austrian futsal player

Mahmut Demir (born 1982) is a Turkish-Austrian futsal player. He currently plays for Stella Rossa Vienna and previously played for Austria 13.

He is a member of the Turkey national futsal team in the UEFA Futsal Championship.
