= Timor Putra Nasional =

Defunct Indonesian automotive company

PT Timor Putra Nasional
- Industry: Automotive
- Founded: 25 August 1995; 31 years ago
- Founder: Tommy Suharto
- Defunct: 5 November 2021; 4 years ago
- Headquarters: Jakarta, Indonesia
- Area served: Indonesia
- Key people: Tommy Suharto (founder & chairman); Soeparto Soejatmo (engineering director)
- Products: Automobiles
- Brands: Timor
- Subsidiaries: KIA Timor Motors (69%); Timor Distributor Nasional; Timor Industri Komponen; Timor Rekayasa Rancang-bangun (R&D)

PT Timor Putra Nasional (TPN), commonly known as Timor, was an Indonesian automobile manufacturer operating between 1996 and 2000 originally formed by businessman Tommy Suharto. The company was created as a response to a presidential instruction (Inpres, Instruksi Presiden) regarding the development of the national car industry. The Indonesian government then appointed TPN as a sole 'national car pioneer'.

Throughout its operations, TPN imported cars made by Kia Motors from South Korea, both through built-up import and knock-down kit import route. TPN had to end its operations after the World Trade Organization (WTO) ruled the national car program was incompatible with WTO rules.

'Timor' is a syllabic abbreviation of Tenaga/Teknologi Industri Mobil Rakyat ('People's Car Industrial Power/Technology'), although several sources said the Timor name was also chosen as a homage to the Timor island which was fully controlled by Indonesia as the East Timor occupation at the time was still ongoing, while 'Putra Nasional' means 'national son' or 'son of the nation'.

== History ==
1996 Australian Broadcasting Corporation report of the special tax exemptions given to Timor.

The company was created as a response to the presidential instruction (Inpres) No. 2 1996 on 28 February 1996 regarding the development of the national car industry, instructing the Minister of Industry and Trade, the Minister of Finance, and the State Minister for Mobilization of Investment Funds to immediately realize the national car industry. The presidential decree mentioned that companies could be granted a 'national car pioneer' status if their products were branded under their own, Indonesian-owned marque, were produced domestically, and used domestically made components. In particular, they had to achieve a minimum of 20%, 40% and 60% local content by the end of, respectively the first, second and third year of operation. The production facilities used for the manufacturing of these automobiles had to be fully owned by Indonesian interests and the eventual co-operation agreements with foreign automakers must not include commitments limiting the possibility to export. 'Pioneer' companies were exempted from duties on imported components (at 65%) and their products were exempted from luxury tax (35% for sedan vehicles) for a period of four years. Later, it was revealed that the Indonesian government approved TPN's production of automobiles in Indonesia more than three months before the announcement in February 1996.

The 'pioneer' status was then granted to TPN, a company that was 99 percent owned and controlled by Tommy Suharto, youngest son of then-president Suharto. TPN would be granted the 'pioneer' status and the financial support from the government if the company fulfilled the requirement requested by the Minister of Economy to produce 15,000 cars by September 1996. Tommy then quickly explored options to initiate a joint venture with foreign manufacturers. Lada and Iran Khodro was under consideration, but eventually Tommy picked Kia Motors as TPN's partner. TPN stated that the company chose Kia because unlike other manufacturers, the South Korean manufacturer allows TPN to produce, modify, rebadge and export its vehicles.

On 8 July 1996, TPN introduced Timor S515 as their first product in Sarinah Building, Jakarta. The car is a badge-engineered Kia Sephia and was initially imported from South Korea as the local manufacturing plant was not built yet. In order to smooth out the import plan, Suharto issued Presidential Decree No. 42 of 1996 which allowed PT TPN to import national cars without being subject to import duties. When the public questioned the practice, Tommy claimed the car was assembled in South Korea by Indonesian migrant workers. Between June 1996 and July 1997, a total of 39,715 cars were imported by TPN from Kia Motors. The cars were then distributed nationally through PT Timor Distributor Nasional. In 1997, TPN held 35.82 percent of market share in the compact sedan segment.

On 24 February 1997, construction of the assembly plant and component manufacturing plant started. Located in Mandala Putra Industrial Area, Cikampek, West Java, the US$1 billion plant was planned to be built and operated by PT Kia Timor Motors, a joint venture owned 70% by TPN and 30% by Kia Motors and would have the capacity to produce 50,000 cars per year. The component manufacturing plant would be operated by Timor Industri Komponen.

On 11 April 1997, TPN introduced the S515i, the fuel injection version of the S515. On 15 May 1997, knock-down assembly of the Timor S515i started in an assembly plant owned by PT Indauda Putra Nasional in Tambun, Bekasi.

By early 1998, 15,000 out of the nearly 40,000 cars imported were reported still sitting unsold in Jakarta— only 2,493 units were sold in 1998 compared to 19,471 units in the previous year. The drop in sales was in line with the overall automotive sales in the country which fell from almost 400,000 in 1997 to about 53,000 in 1998.

During the May 1998 riots in Java, Timor owners would remove the 'T' logos in the hope that they would not be targeted by protesters in order not to be associated with Suharto. Dealers that still had thousands of Timor cars unsold after the crisis had to rebrand themselves by changing the signage colour while keeping the Timor name as an attempt to distance themselves from Suharto and his family.

In 2000, Kia considered reviving the Timor by restructuring Timor Putra Nasional. Kia planned to invest to TPN and finish the Cikampek factory, with a condition from the South Korean Minister of Trade Affairs, Han Duck-soo that TPN must be clear from any influence of Tommy Suharto. The investment was not realized as Kia used Indomobil's National Assembler plant to assemble cars from kits locally instead.

After being inactive, the company encountered numerous lawsuits, mostly with the Indonesian government. The company officially ceased to exist on 5 November 2021 after all of its assets were confiscated by the government following a legal decision on Tommy Suharto.

=== WTO dispute ===
Japan, the United States, and the European Communities protested the national car program and privilege of Timor cars. A lawsuit was then brought to the World Trade Organization (WTO). The program was declared incompatible with WTO rules by Dispute Settlement Body of WTO in 1998. It was proved that the “national car program” violated the World Trade Organization Agreement on Subsidies and Countervailing Duties because the exemption from taxes is a subsidy contingent upon the use of domestic goods. As the result, the company had to cease operating per presidential decree (Keppres) No 20 1998 issued on 21 January 1998. TPN was also ordered to pay the unpaid luxury goods taxes back when they imported the cars tax-free for US$1.3 billion.

== Effects on the automotive industry ==
As the Timor's retail price significantly undercut its competitors, it quickly gained market share while at the same time hurt competitors' sales and market share. The Timor was priced around Rp 35 million, around half of the price of its competitors in the same segment. For comparison, the similarly sized Toyota Corolla was priced around Rp 70 million. By the end of the first semester of 1997, Timor cars had gained 26% of passenger car market share. Ford Motor Company and Chrysler had to pull their investment from Indonesia, claiming their products wouldn't compete with the government-subsidized Timor. At the time, Ford was planning to locally assemble the Ford Escort, while Chrysler was planning to produce Chrysler Neon from kits. Meanwhile, General Motors which had already operated a manufacturing plant in the country announced in June 1996 that it would put their future investment plans on hold.

The establishment of Timor also led to the cancellation of the government's own national car project, the Zagato-designed M3 Maleo (Mobil Murah Masyarakat Maleo). This was a joint venture project between Konsorsium Mobil Indonesia (Indonesian Car Consortium) owned by B. J. Habibie, Millard Design and Orbital Engineering (Australia). It also sparked a conflict between Tommy and his brother Bambang Trihatmodjo, as Bambang already started a similar project called Bimantara Motor and partnered with Hyundai Motor to build a manufacturing plant in Bekasi, but TPN which had no manufacturing plant was instead appointed by the government as the 'national car pioneer'.

== Products ==
=== Production vehicles ===
==== Timor S5 series (S515/S515i/S516i) ====
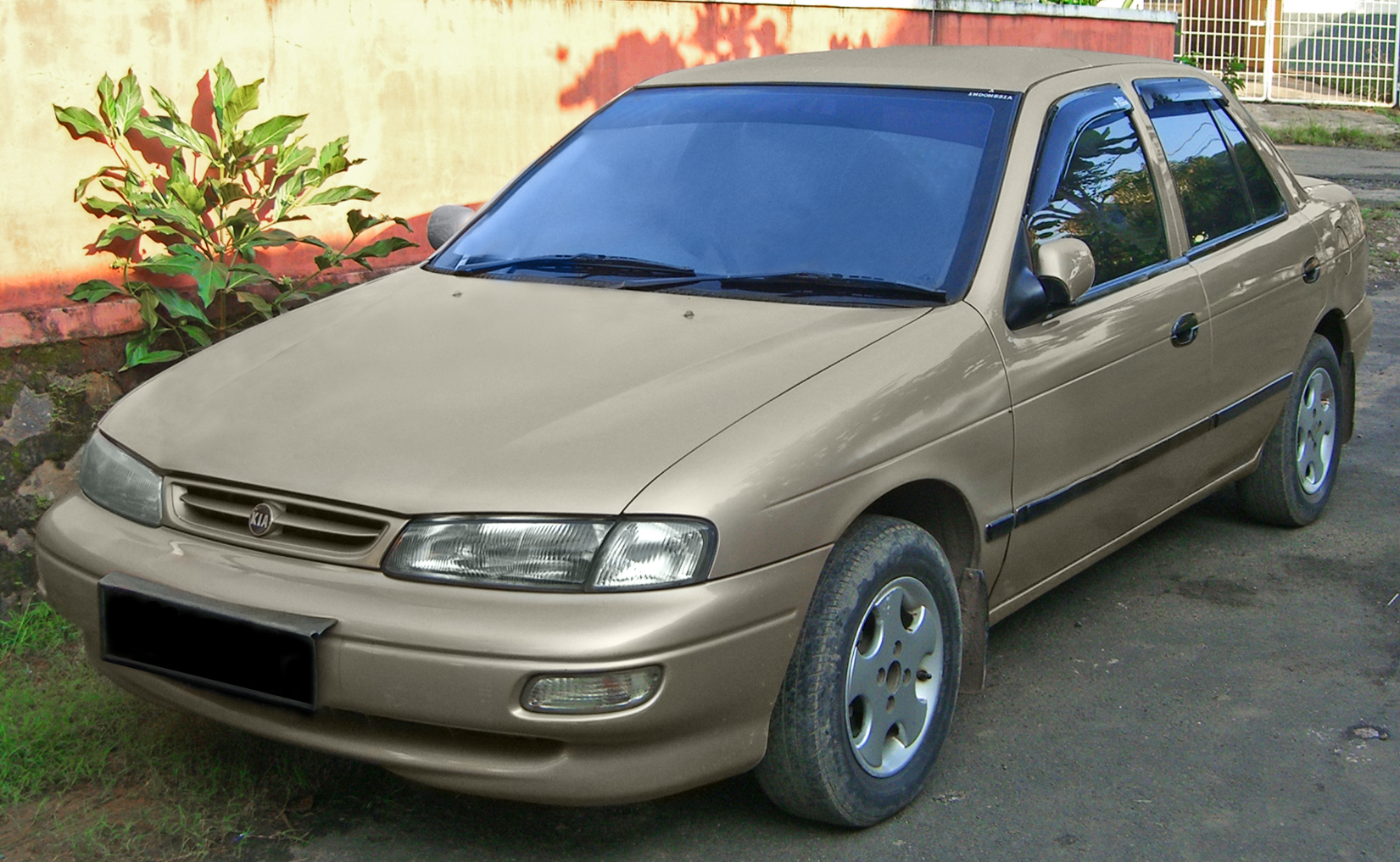
Timor S515 with its Timor badge swapped to Kia

Timor S5 series are the first range of products released by TPN. It is a rebadged version of Kia Sephia. 'S' stands for sedan while the '5' is an identifier to differentiate it with the future cancelled product, the Timor S2 series. The range consisted of the S515 (SOHC carbureted), S515i (DOHC, fuel injected), and S516i LE (sports-oriented limited edition, licensed by Prodrive).

Compared to the Kia Sephia, the Timor S5 series is equipped with less features to cut prices. It did not come with an automatic transmission option, airbags or ABS unlike the global version of Sephia. It is also converted into right hand drive layout.

==== Timor SW516i ====
Some very limited numbers of 'SW516i' station wagons were manufactured by New Armada, a local car body manufacturer based in Magelang, Central Java. It is based on the S516i. This item is now considered rare and highly priced by the car enthusiasts, however at the time it was officially sold in Timor dealers. TPN planned to build 50 SW516i, however only 30 was actually built.

=== Prototype and concept vehicles ===
==== Timor SL516i ====
Timor SL516i is a limousine sedan prototype based on the S516i. It featured six doors and only one copy was built.

==== Timor J5 (J520i) ====
Timor had also planned to rebadge the first generation Kia Sportage as the Timor J520i, but between the looming WTO lawsuit and the collapse of Kia and the Suharto regime this never materialized. The car is an SUV (referred as a 'Jip/Jeep' in Indonesia), thus the 'J' letter. As the name suggests, the car would be powered by a 2.0 L engine like the Sportage.

==== Timor S2 (S213i) ====
Timor S2 series, specifically the S213i is a hatchback prototype that was developed in-house by TPN. The development was conceived and supervised by Soeparto Soejatmo, the engineering director of TPN. The exterior design was done by Zagato, and the car was powered by a 1.3 L 16V DOHC fuel injection engine with power output around 82 hp mated with a 5-speed manual transmission. The rear suspension is an independent suspension with a single leaf spring. The prototype was finished in 2000.

==== Timor Borneo ====
Timor Borneo was allegedly planned to be a rebadged version of the cancelled Lamborghini LM003 SUV. The badge-engineering job was achievable since Tommy also owned a stake in Lamborghini through Megatech. Borneo was a reference to the Borneo island, locally known as Kalimantan.

== Sales figures ==
Year	Sales
1996	6,042
1997	19,471
1998	2,493
1999	3,087
2000	8,530
2001	2,045
2002	395
2003	306
2004	265
2005	239
2006	150
2007	242
2008	4
Total	43,269
