= Timur (surname) =

Timur and spelling variants thereof is the surname of:

- Anwara Taimur (1936–2020), Indian politician, chief minister of Assam
- Aysegul Timur, American academic administrator
- Bar Timor (born 1992), Israeli basketball player
- Mahmut Temür (born 1989), German footballer
- Minarti Timur, Chinese-Indonesian badminton player

== See also ==
- Said bin Taimur, 13th Sultan of Oman
- Danish Taimoor, Pakistani actor
