= İlyas Demir =

Turkish karateka (born 1985)

- Born: June 16, 1985 (age 39); Istanbul, Turkey
- Nationality: Turkish
- Division: -60 kg
- Style: Karate Kumite
- Team: Istanbul BB SK

İlyas Demir
Medal record

Men's Karate

European Championships
Silver medal – second place	2010 Athens	Kumite -60kg
Bronze medal – third place	2009 Zagreb	Kumite -60kg
Silver medal – second place	2007 Bratislava	Kumite -60kg

Tournaments
Gold medal – first place	2010 Baku Open	Kumite -60kg
Bronze medal – third place	2007 German Open	Kumite -60kg
Bronze medal – third place	2007 Italian Open	Kumite -60kg

İlyas Demir (born June 16, 1985 in Istanbul, Turkey) is a Turkish karateka competing in the kumite -60 kg division. He is a member of the İstanbul Büyükşehir Belediyesi S.K.

== Achievements ==
2010

- Gold Baku Open - September 14 Baku AZE - kumite -60 kg
- Silver 45th European Championships - May 7, Athens GRE - kumite -60 kg

2009

- Bronze 44th European Championships - May 8, Zagreb CRO - kumite -60 kg

2007

- Bronze German Open - September 15, Aschaffenburg GER - kumite -60 kg
- Silver 42nd European Championships - May 4, Bratislava SVK - kumite -60 kg
- Bronze Italian Open - March 31, Monza ITA - kumite -60 kg
