= Temur =

Temur or Temür is a masculine given name of Turkic origin. Notable people with the name include:

== Given name ==
- Temurkhuja Abdukholiqov (born 1991), Uzbek footballer
- Temur Apakidze (1954–2001), Russian major general of Georgian ethnicity
- Temur Babluani (born 1948), Georgian film director, script writer, and actor
- Temur Chkhaidze (born 1955), Georgian footballer
- Temur Chogadze (born 1998), Georgian footballer
- Temur Dzhikiya (born 1998), Russian footballer
- Temurbek Giyazov (born 1996), Uzbek para-athlete
- Temur Iakobashvili (born 1967), Georgian politician and diplomat
- Temur Ismailov (born 1995), Uzbek tennis player
- Temur Juraev (born 1984), Uzbekistani footballer
- Temur Kabisashvili (born 1967), Georgian footballer
- Temur Ketsbaia (born 1968), Georgian football manager and former player
- Temür Khan (1265–1307), ruler of the Yuan dynasty
- Temur Kuybokarov (born 2000), Uzbekistani-born Australian chess Grandmaster
- Temur Maisuradze (1959–2026), Georgian politician
- Temur-Malik (White Horde) (died 1378), Khan of the White Horde
- Temur Mustafin (born 1995), Russian footballer
- Temur Mzhavia, Abkhaz politician
- Temur Nozadze (born 1998), Georgian judoka
- Temur Partsvania (born 1991), Ukrainian footballer
- Temür Qutlugh (1370–1399), Khan of the Golden Horde
- Temur Rakhimov (born 1997), Tajikistani judoka
- Temur Sabirov (1940–1977), Soviet-Tajik physicist and mathematician
- Temur Samkharadze (born 2001), Georgian powerlifter
- Temur Tsiklauri (1946–2021), Georgian pop singer and actor
- Temur Tugushi (1972–2021), Georgian football player and manager
- Temur Ugulava (1970–2026), Georgian entrepreneur, businessman, philanthropist, and hospitality executive
- Öljei Temür Khan (1379–1412), khagan of the Northern Yuan dynasty

== Surname ==
- Bolad Temür (died 1365), warlord of the Yuan dynasty
- Buqa Temür (died 1282), Khan of the Chagatai Khanate
- Chaghan Temur (died 1362), Yuan dynasty general
- Duwa Temür (died 1330), Khan of the Chagatai Khanate
- El Temür (died 1333), official of the Yuan dynasty behind the coup d'etat that made Toghon Temür emperor
- Jahan Temür, Jalayirid puppet ruler of the Ilkhanate
- Jayaatu Khan Tugh Temür (1304–1332), born Tugh Temür, Emperor of China and Khagan of the Mongol Empire
- Köke Temür (died 1375), Yuan dynasty general
- Mengu-Timur or Möngke Temür (died 1280), Khan of the Golden Horde
- Möngke Temür (Ilkhanate) (1256–1282), Ilkhanate ruler of Shiraz
- Shah Temur (died 1358), Khan of the Chagatai Khanate
- Togha Temür (died 1353), claimant to the throne of the Ilkhanate
- Toghon Temür (1320–1370), Emperor of China and last Khagan of the Mongol Empire
- Uskhal Khan Tögüs Temür (1342–1388), emperor of the Northern Yuan dynasty
- Yesun Temur (Chagatai Khanate), Khan of the Chagatai Khanate
- Yesün Temür (Yuan dynasty) (1293–1328), emperor of the Yuan dynasty

== See also ==
- Timur (given name)
