= Timur Rakhmatullin =

Russian footballer (born 1983)

Personal information
- Full name: Timur Mingaliyevich Rakhmatullin
- Date of birth: 24 February 1983 (age 43)
- Height: 1.86 m (6 ft 1 in)
- Position: Goalkeeper

Senior career*
Years	Team	Apps	(Gls)
2000–2001	FC Sodovik Sterlitamak	0	(0)
2003	FC Sodovik Sterlitamak	0	(0)
2007	FC Sodovik Sterlitamak	1	(0)
2008–2009	FC Sibiryak Bratsk	29	(0)
2010–2012	FC Chita	27	(0)
2012–2014	FC Sibiryak Bratsk	45	(0)
2005–2016	FC Sterlitamak		
- * Club domestic league appearances and goals

Timur Mingaliyevich Rakhmatullin (Russian: Тимур Мингалиевич Рахматуллин; born 24 February 1983) is a former Russian professional football player.

== Club career ==
He played in the Russian Football National League for FC Sodovik Sterlitamak in 2007.
