= Tamerlan (given name) =

Tamerlan, derived from the name of Muslim Turkic conqueror Tamerlane, is a given name. Notable people with the name include:

- Tamerlan Sikoyev (born 1976), Russian footballer
- Tamerlan Tagziev (born 1981), Canadian wrestler
- Tamerlan Thorell (1830–1901), Swedish arachnologist
- Tamerlan Tmenov (born 1977), Russian judoka
- Tamerlan Tsarnaev (1986–2013), Russian terrorist
- Tamerlan Varziyev (born 1978), Russian footballer
