= Taimur =

Taimur is a masculine given name and a surname. It may refer to:

== Given name ==
- an alternate spelling of Timur (1320s–1405), Turco-Mongol conqueror and founder of the Timurid Empire, also known as Tamerlane
- Taimur or Timur Shah Durrani (1746–1793), second ruler of the Afghan Durrani Empire
- Taimur bin Asa'ad (born 1980), a member of the Omani royal family and banker
- Taimur bin Feisal (1886–1965), Sultan of Muscat and Oman
- Taimur Ali (born 1991), Pakistani cricketer
- Taimur Hussain (born 1974), Pakistani golfer
- Taimur Khan Jhagra (born 1977), Pakistani politician, former Provincial Minister of Khyber Pakhtunkhwa for Finance and Health
- Taimur Ali Khan, Pakistani politician elected in 2024
- Taimur Khan (Balochistan cricketer) (born 1991), Pakistani cricketer
- Taimur Khan (Khyber Pakhtunkhwa cricketer) (born 1975), Pakistani cricketer
- Taimur Khan (Punjab cricketer) (born 1996), Pakistani cricketer
- Taimur Alam Khandaker, Bangladeshi politician and former chairman of the Bangladesh Road Transport Corporation
- Taimur Rahman (born 1975), Pakistani political activist and musician

== Surname ==
- Anwara Taimur (1936–2020), Indian politician and Chief Minister of Assam
- Zarqa Taimur, Pakistani politician and cosmetologist, member of the Senate of Pakistan since 2021

== See also ==
- Taimoor Sultan (born 1994), Pakistani cricketer
- Taimour Abdulwahab al-Abdaly (1981–2010), prime suspect in the 2010 Stockholm bombings
- Timur (disambiguation)
