= Karate at the 2005 World Games =

- Venue: Kfraftzentrale
- Dates: 23–24 July 2005

The karate events at the 2005 World Games in Duisburg was played between 23 and 24 July. The karate competition took place at Kfraftzentrale.

== Medal table ==
Rank	Nation	Gold	Silver	Bronze	Total
1	Russia	3	1	1	5
2	Germany	2	2	3	7
3	Italy	2	2	0	4
4	Japan	1	2	0	3
5	Venezuela	1	1	2	4
6	Greece	1	1	0	2
7	Egypt	1	0	1	2
8	Serbia and Montenegro	1	0	0	1
8	Turkey	1	0	0	1
10	Australia	0	1	0	1
10	France	0	1	0	1
10	Mexico	0	1	0	1
10	United States	0	1	0	1
14	Bosnia and Herzegovina	0	0	1	1
14	Canada	0	0	1	1
14	Croatia	0	0	1	1
14	Great Britain	0	0	1	1
14	Peru	0	0	1	1
14	Slovakia	0	0	1	1
Totals (19 entries)		13	13	13	39

== Events ==
=== Men's events ===
Event	Gold	Silver	Bronze
Kata	Antonio Díaz; Venezuela	Luca Valdesi; Italy	Akio Tamashiro; Peru
Kumite 60 kg	Michele Giuliani; Italy	Yury Kalashnikov; Russia	Miguel Yépez; Venezuela
Kumite 65 kg	Dimitrios Triantafyllis; Greece	Luis Plumacher; Venezuela	Christian Grüner; Germany
Kumite 70 kg	Giuseppe Di Domenico; Italy	Emilio Oviedo; Mexico	Sayguidmagomed Shakhrudinov; Russia
Kumite 75 kg	Köksal Çakır; Germany	Konstantinos Papadopoulos; Greece	Klaudio Farmadín; Slovakia
Kumite 80 kg	Islamutdin Eldaruchev; Russia	Salvatore Loria; Italy	Philippe Poirier; Canada
Kumite +80 kg	Alexander Gerunov; Russia	Felix Kühnle; Germany	Alen Zamlić; Croatia
Kumite open	Alexander Gerunov; Russia	Shinji Nagaki; Japan	Mohamed El-Shemy; Egypt

=== Women's events ===
Event	Gold	Silver	Bronze
Kata	Atsuko Wakai; Japan	Myriam Szkudlarek; France	Ana Martínez; Venezuela
Kumite 53 kg	Heba El-Sayed; Egypt	Tomoko Araga; Japan	Kora Knühmann; Germany
Kumite 60 kg	Snežana Perić; Serbia and Montenegro	Maria Musall; Germany	Lejla Ferhatbegović; Bosnia and Herzegovina
Kumite +60 kg	Nadine Ziemer; Germany	Elisa Au; United States	Tania Weekes; Great Britain
Kumite open	Yıldız Aras; Turkey	Natasha Hardy; Australia	Nadine Ziemer; Germany
