= List of Pan American Games medalists in karate =

This is the complete list of Pan American Games medalists in karate from 1995 to 2015.

== Men's events ==
=== Kata ===
Games	Gold	Silver	Bronze
1995	Christi Chutchurru (ARG)	Fredy Arevalo (PER)	Tredie Allas (USA)
1999	Akira Fukuda (USA)	Antonio Díaz (VEN)	Akio Tamashiro (PER) Hector Ortiz (MEX)
2003	Antonio Díaz (VEN)	Clay Morton (USA)	Jurandir Andrade (BRA) Akio Tamashiro (PER)

=== Kumite (– 60 kg) ===
Games	Gold	Silver	Bronze
1999	Yusey Padron (CUB)	Dov Sternberg (USA)	Eduardo Noguera (VEN) Sidirley Souza (BRA)
2007	Francisco Nievas (ARG)	Eynar Tamame (CUB)	Douglas Brose (BRA) Norberto Sosa (DOM)
2011	Andrés Rendón (COL)	Norberto Sosa (DOM)	Douglas Brose (BRA)
2011	Andrés Rendón (COL)	Norberto Sosa (DOM)	Miguel Soffia (CHI)
2015	Douglas Brose (BRA)	Jovanni Martínez (VEN)	Andrés Rendón (COL)
2015	Douglas Brose (BRA)	Jovanni Martínez (VEN)	Brandis Miyazaki (USA)

=== Kumite (– 62 kg) ===
Games	Gold	Silver	Bronze
2003	Alexis Carbajal (PER)	Carlos Luces (VEN)	Yusei Padron (CUB) Sidirley Souza (BRA)

=== Kumite (– 65 kg) ===
Games	Gold	Silver	Bronze
1999	George Kotaka (USA)	Alberto Espejo (COL)	William Preciado (ECU) Enrique Vilela (CUB)
2007	Luis Plumacher (VEN)	Carlos Lourenço (BRA)	Lucio Martínez (ARG) Aron Pérez (ESA)

=== Kumite (– 66 kg) ===
Games	Gold	Silver	Bronze
1995	Pablo Torres del Toro (CUB)	Sergio Gavrelof (ARG)	Carlos Espajo (COL)

=== Kumite (– 67 kg) ===
Games	Gold	Silver	Bronze
2011	Daniel Viveros (ECU)	Dennis Novo (CUB)	Daniel Carrillo (MEX)
2011	Daniel Viveros (ECU)	Dennis Novo (CUB)	Jean Carlos Peña (VEN)
2015	Julián Pinzás (ARG)	Deivis Ferreras (DOM)	Maikel Noriega (CUB)
2015	Julián Pinzás (ARG)	Deivis Ferreras (DOM)	Daniel Vargas (MEX)

=== Kumite (– 68 kg) ===
Games	Gold	Silver	Bronze
2003	Jean Carlos Peña (VEN)	Saeed Baghbani (CAN)	Dionicio Gustavo (DOM) Yordanis Torres (CUB)

=== Kumite (– 70 kg) ===
Games	Gold	Silver	Bronze
1999	Anthony Boelbaai (AHO)	Jaime Noguera (VEN)	Jean Carlos Peña (VEN) Celio Vieiro (BRA)
2007	Saeed Baghbani (CAN)	Jean Carlos Peña (VEN)	Alberto Mancebo (DOM) Vinícius Souza (BRA)

=== Kumite (– 72 kg) ===
Games	Gold	Silver	Bronze
1995	José Vilela (CUB)	Javier Strohmeier (PER)	Dustin Baldis (USA)

=== Kumite (– 74 kg) ===
Games	Gold	Silver	Bronze
2003	Rubel Salomón (DOM)	José Ignacio Pérez (VEN)	Alonso Murayama (MEX) Emmanuel Santana (BRA)

=== Kumite (– 75 kg) ===
Games	Gold	Silver	Bronze
1999	Ricardo Pérez (VEN)	António Pinto (BRA)	Alonso Murayama (MEX) Massimiliano Pagano (BRA)
2007	Dionicio Gustavo (DOM)	Jorge Zaragoza (CUB)	David Dubó (CHI) William Serrano (ESA)
2011	Dionicio Gustavo (DOM)	Thomas Scott (USA)	Lester Zamora (CUB)
2011	Dionicio Gustavo (DOM)	Thomas Scott (USA)	David Dubó (CHI)
2015	Thomas Scott (USA)	Alexander Nicastro (VEN)	Patrice Boily-Martineau (CAN)
2015	Thomas Scott (USA)	Alexander Nicastro (VEN)	Franco Icasati (ARG)

=== Kumite (– 80 kg) ===
Games	Gold	Silver	Bronze
1995	Noel Hernández (CUB)	Daniel Tesoro (ARG)	Thomas Hodd (USA)
1999	John Fonseca (USA)	Nelson Sardenberg (BRA)	Bravo Rodríguez (CUB) Antonio Puente Torres (MEX)
2003	John Fonseca (USA)	Nelson Sardenberg (BRA)	Ricardinho Pietersz (AHO) Jorge Strohmeier (PER)
2007	Diego Bórquez (CHI)	Gilberto Ocoro (COL)	Philippe Poirier (CAN) Nelson Sardenberg (BRA)

=== Kumite (+ 80 kg) ===
Games	Gold	Silver	Bronze
1995	Eddy Obispo (AHO)	Anibal Rossi (ARG)	Otilio Cartagena (PUR)
1999	Douglas Selchan (USA)	Altamiro Cruz (BRA)	Manuel Costa (URU) Yoel Díaz (CUB)
2003	Mario Toro (VEN)	Sterling Felix (DOM)	Luis Bolívar (PER) Leandro Monzón (ARG)
2007	Juarez Santos (BRA)	Mario Toro (VEN)	Andrés Heredia (ECU) Juan Valdez (DOM)

=== Kumite (– 84 kg) ===
Games	Gold	Silver	Bronze
2011	Cesar Herrera (VEN)	Jorge Pérez (DOM)	Homero Morales (MEX)
2011	Cesar Herrera (VEN)	Jorge Pérez (DOM)	Sorin Alexadnru (CAN)
2015	Miguel Amargós (ARG)	Jorge Merino (ESA)	Andres Loor (ECU)
2015	Miguel Amargós (ARG)	Jorge Merino (ESA)	César Herrera (VEN)

=== Kumite (+84 kg) ===
Games	Gold	Silver	Bronze
2011	Angel Aponte (VEN)	Alberto Ramirez (MEX)	Wellington Barbosa (BRA)
2011	Angel Aponte (VEN)	Alberto Ramirez (MEX)	Shaun Dhillon (CAN)
2015	Franklin Mina (ECU)	Anel Castillo (DOM)	Jander Tiril (CUB)
2015	Franklin Mina (ECU)	Anel Castillo (DOM)	Brian Irr (USA)

=== Kumite (Open Class) ===
Games	Gold	Silver	Bronze
1995	José Gómez (BRA)	Lazaro Montano (CUB)	Eric Albino (PUR)

=== Kumite (Team) ===
Games	Gold	Silver	Bronze
1995	Argentina (ARG)	Brazil (BRA)	Paraguay (PAR) United States (USA)

== Women's events ==
=== Kata ===
Games	Gold	Silver	Bronze
1995	Melanie Genum (USA)	Sandy Kim (PER)	Paola Chaves (ARG)
1999	Kellie Kennedy (USA)	Ulda Alarcon (MEX)	Ana Martínez (VEN)
2003	Yohana Sánchez (VEN)	Junko Arai (USA)	Cintia Lassalvia (BRA) Yessenia Reyes (ECU)

=== Kumite (– 50 kg) ===
Games	Gold	Silver	Bronze
2011	Ana Villanueva (DOM)	Gabriela Bruna (CHI)	Jessica Candido (BRA)
2011	Ana Villanueva (DOM)	Gabriela Bruna (CHI)	Cheili Gonzalez (GUA)
2015	Ana Villanueva (DOM)	Gabriela Bruna (CHI)	Jusleen Virk (CAN)
2015	Ana Villanueva (DOM)	Gabriela Bruna (CHI)	Aline Souza (BRA)

=== Kumite (– 53 kg) ===
Games	Gold	Silver	Bronze
1995	Vivian Sosa (CUB)	Lara Oliveira (BRA)	Julia Seclen (PER)
1999	Beisy Quintana (CUB)	Gladys Eusebio (PER)	Btissima Essadiqi (CAN) Christina Muccini (USA)
2007	Cheili González (GUA)	Valéria Kumizaki (BRA)	Jennifer Guillette (CAN) Jessy Reyes (CHI)

=== Kumite (+ 53 kg) ===
Games	Gold	Silver	Bronze
1995	Nicole Poirier (CAN)	Tracey Day (USA)	Lai How (USA) Maria Silvera (URU)

=== Kumite (– 55 kg) ===
Games	Gold	Silver	Bronze
2011	Shannon Nishi (USA)	Karina Diaz (DOM)	Valéria Kumizaki (BRA)
2011	Shannon Nishi (USA)	Karina Diaz (DOM)	Jessy Reyes (CHI)
2015	Valéria Kumizaki (BRA)	Kate Campbell (CAN)	Jessy Reyes (CHI)
2015	Valéria Kumizaki (BRA)	Kate Campbell (CAN)	Alessandra Vindrola (PER)

=== Kumite (– 58 kg) ===
Games	Gold	Silver	Bronze
2003	Lucélia Ribeiro (BRA)	Molly Sánchez (PER)	Cheryl Murphy (USA) Nassim Varasteh (CAN)

=== Kumite (+ 58 kg) ===
Games	Gold	Silver	Bronze
2003	Heidy Rodríguez (DOM)	Btissama Essadiqi (CAN)	Marta Embriz (MEX) Cheili González (GUA)

=== Kumite (– 60 kg) ===
Games	Gold	Silver	Bronze
1999	María Wayow (VEN)	María Maia (BRA)	Barbara Chinen (USA) Lisa Ling (CAN)
2007	Heidy Rodríguez (DOM)	Bertha Gutiérrez (MEX)	Carmen Arias (ECU) Susana Bojaico (PER)

=== Kumite (+ 60 kg) ===
Games	Gold	Silver	Bronze
1999	Lucelia Ribeiro (BRA)	Katty Mercedes Acevedo (DOM)	Cristina Madrid (MEX) Kimberly Morgan (USA)
2007	Lucelia Ribeiro (BRA)	Ana Escandón (COL)	Yoly Guillen (VEN) Yaneya Gutiérrez (CUB)

=== Kumite (– 61 kg) ===
Games	Gold	Silver	Bronze
2011	Bertha Gutierrez (MEX)	Alexandra Grande (PER)	Daniela Suarez (VEN)
2011	Bertha Gutierrez (MEX)	Alexandra Grande (PER)	Marisca Verspaget (AHO)
2015	Alexandra Grande (PER)	Karina Díaz (DOM)	Daniela Lepín (CHI)
2015	Alexandra Grande (PER)	Karina Díaz (DOM)	Merillela Arreola (MEX)

=== Kumite (– 68 kg) ===
Games	Gold	Silver	Bronze
2011	Lucelia Ribeiro (BRA)	Yadira Lira (MEX)	Yoly Guillen (VEN)
2011	Lucelia Ribeiro (BRA)	Yadira Lira (MEX)	Yoandra Moreno (CUB)
2015	Natália Brozulatto (BRA)	Xhunashi Caballero (MEX)	Priscilla Lazo Nieto (ECU)
2015	Natália Brozulatto (BRA)	Xhunashi Caballero (MEX)	Omaira Molina (VEN)

=== Kumite (+ 68 kg) ===
Games	Gold	Silver	Bronze
2011	Maria Castellanos (GUA)	Xunashi Caballero (MEX)	Olivia Grant (CAN)
2011	Maria Castellanos (GUA)	Xunashi Caballero (MEX)	Claudia Vera (CHI)
2015	Valeria Echever (ECU)	Camélie Boisvenue (CAN)	Yeisy Piña Ordaz (VEN)
2015	Valeria Echever (ECU)	Camélie Boisvenue (CAN)	Isabela dos Santos (BRA)

=== Kumite (Team) ===
Games	Gold	Silver	Bronze
1995	Cuba (CUB)	Brazil (BRA)	Argentina (ARG) United States (USA)
