= Karate at the 2005 World Games – Women's kumite +60 kg =

Women's kumite +60 kg at the 2005 World Games
- Venue: Kfraftzentrale
- Date: 23 July 2005
- Competitors: 8 from 6 nations

Medalists
1st place, gold medalist(s)		(Germany) Nadine Ziemer
2nd place, silver medalist(s)		(United States) Elisa Au
3rd place, bronze medalist(s)		(United Kingdom) Tania Weekes

The women's kumite +60 kg competition in karate at the 2005 World Games took place on 23 July 2005 at the Kfraftzentrale in Duisburg, Germany.

== Competition format ==
A total of 8 athletes entered the competition. In elimination round they fought in two groups. From this stage the best two athletes qualifies to the semifinals.

== Results ==
=== Elimination round ===
==== Group A ====
Rank	Athlete	B	W	D	L	Pts	Score
1	Tania Weekes (GBR)	3	2	1	0	5	9–1
2	Nadine Ziemer (GER)	3	2	1	0	5	2–0
3	Alysha Dew (AUS)	3	0	1	2	1	2–6
4	Yasmina Benadda (GER)	3	0	1	2	1	1–7

	Score	
Nadine Ziemer (GER)	1–0	Alysha Dew (AUS)
Tania Weekes (GBR)	5–0	Yasmina Benadda (GER)
Nadine Ziemer (GER)	0–0	Tania Weekes (GBR)
Alysha Dew (AUS)	1–1	Yasmina Benadda (GER)
Nadine Ziemer (GER)	1–0	Yasmina Benadda (GER)
Alysha Dew (AUS)	1–4	Tania Weekes (GBR)

==== Group B ====
Rank	Athlete	B	W	D	L	Pts	Score
1	Elisa Au (USA)	3	2	0	1	4	9–4
2	Vanesca Nortan (NED)	3	2	0	1	4	4–1
3	Monique Puscher (GER)	3	1	1	1	3	3–6
4	Tamaryn Fry (RSA)	3	0	1	2	1	1–6

	Score	
Tamaryn Fry (RSA)	0–4	Elisa Au (USA)
Monique Puscher (GER)	1–0	Vanesca Nortan (NED)
Tamaryn Fry (RSA)	1–1	Monique Puscher (GER)
Elisa Au (USA)	0–3	Vanesca Nortan (NED)
Tamaryn Fry (RSA)	0–1	Vanesca Nortan (NED)
Elisa Au (USA)	5–1	Monique Puscher (GER)

=== Finals ===
Semifinals
Tania Weekes (GBR)	0
Elisa Au (USA)	5
Vanesca Nortan (NED)	0
Nadine Ziemer (GER)	1

Final
Elisa Au (USA)	1
Nadine Ziemer (GER)	7
Third place
Tania Weekes (GBR)	1
Vanesca Nortan (NED)	0
