= 2004 World Karate Championships =

Karate competition

- Host city: Monterrey, Mexico
- Dates: 18–21 November
- Main venue: Monterrey Arena

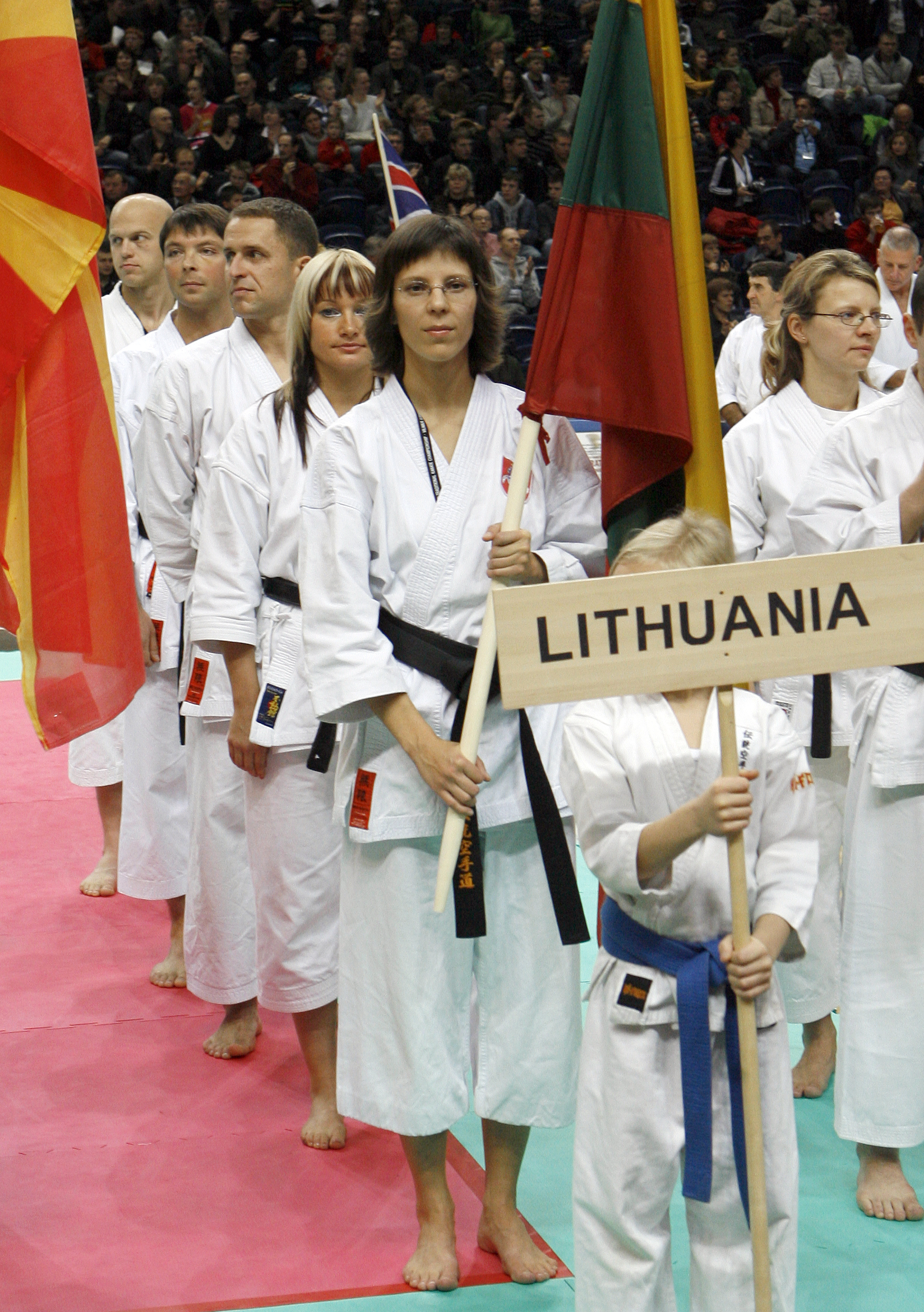
2008 m. pasaulio tradicinio karate čempionatas, Vilnius

The 2004 World Karate Championships are the 17th edition of the World Karate Championships, and were held in Monterrey, Mexico from November 18 to November 21, 2004.

== Medalists ==
=== Men ===
Event	Gold	Silver	Bronze
Individual kata	Luca Valdesi; Italy	Akio Tamashiro; Peru	Antonio Díaz; Venezuela
Individual kata	Luca Valdesi; Italy	Akio Tamashiro; Peru	Toshihide Uchiage; Canada
Team kata	Italy; Vincenzo Figuccio; Lucio Maurino; Luca Valdesi	Japan	France; Julien Dupont; Ayoub Neghliz; Jonathan Plagnol
Team kata	Italy; Vincenzo Figuccio; Lucio Maurino; Luca Valdesi	Japan	Mexico; Martín Romero; José Romero; Jesús Ruíz
Kumite −60 kg	Paul Newby; England	Hossein Rouhani; Iran	David Luque; Spain
Kumite −60 kg	Paul Newby; England	Hossein Rouhani; Iran	Yury Kalashnikov; Russia
Kumite −65 kg	Luis Plumacher; Venezuela	Ádám Kovács; Hungary	Lucio Martínez; Argentina
Kumite −65 kg	Luis Plumacher; Venezuela	Ádám Kovács; Hungary	Alexandre Biamonti; France
Kumite −70 kg	Shinji Nagaki; Japan	Mensur Cakić; Bosnia and Herzegovina	Sayguidmagomed Shakhrudinov; Russia
Kumite −70 kg	Shinji Nagaki; Japan	Mensur Cakić; Bosnia and Herzegovina	Óscar Vázquez; Spain
Kumite −75 kg	David Santana; Spain	Konstantinos Papadopoulos; Greece	Klaudio Farmadín; Slovakia
Kumite −75 kg	David Santana; Spain	Konstantinos Papadopoulos; Greece	Yavuz Karamollaoğlu; Turkey
Kumite −80 kg	Zeynel Çelik; Turkey	Daniël Sabanovic; Netherlands	Yann Baillon; France
Kumite −80 kg	Zeynel Çelik; Turkey	Daniël Sabanovic; Netherlands	John Fonseca; United States
Kumite +80 kg	Alexander Gerunov; Russia	Leon Walters; England	Alen Zamlić; Croatia
Kumite +80 kg	Alexander Gerunov; Russia	Leon Walters; England	Thomas Bjuring; Denmark
Kumite open	Rory Daniels; England	Seydina Baldé; France	Stefano Maniscalco; Italy
Kumite open	Rory Daniels; England	Seydina Baldé; France	Mehran Behnamfar; Iran
Team kumite	France; Yann Baillon; Seydina Baldé; Olivier Beaudry; Ludovic Cacheux; Franck Chantalou; Guillaume Cossou; Florian Malguy	Spain; Santiago Bayo; Sergio Cubero; Iván Leal; Francisco Martínez; Óscar Martínez; David Santana; Óscar Vázquez	Italy; Davide Benetello; Giuseppe Di Domenico; Vincenzo Iarnone; Biagio Laforgia; Salvatore Loria; Stefano Maniscalco; Ciro Massa
Team kumite	France; Yann Baillon; Seydina Baldé; Olivier Beaudry; Ludovic Cacheux; Franck Chantalou; Guillaume Cossou; Florian Malguy	Spain; Santiago Bayo; Sergio Cubero; Iván Leal; Francisco Martínez; Óscar Martínez; David Santana; Óscar Vázquez	Russia

=== Women ===
Event	Gold	Silver	Bronze
Individual kata	Atsuko Wakai; Japan	Myriam Szkudlarek; France	Alessandra Caribé; Brazil
Individual kata	Atsuko Wakai; Japan	Myriam Szkudlarek; France	Yohana Sánchez; Venezuela
Team kata	Japan	France; Jessica Buil; Sabrina Buil; Laëtitia Guesnel	Brazil
Team kata	Japan	France; Jessica Buil; Sabrina Buil; Laëtitia Guesnel	Spain; Miriam Cogolludo; Ruth Jiménez; Almudena Muñoz
Kumite −53 kg	Tomoko Araga; Japan	Cheili González; Guatemala	Shannon Nishi; United States
Kumite −53 kg	Tomoko Araga; Japan	Cheili González; Guatemala	Kora Knühmann; Germany
Kumite −60 kg	Yadira Lira; Mexico	Nathalie Leroy; France	Noelia Fernández; Spain
Kumite −60 kg	Yadira Lira; Mexico	Nathalie Leroy; France	Alexandra Kurtz; Germany
Kumite +60 kg	Elisa Au; United States	Vanesca Nortan; Netherlands	Zsuzsanna Klima; Hungary
Kumite +60 kg	Elisa Au; United States	Vanesca Nortan; Netherlands	Laurence Fischer; France
Kumite open	Elisa Au; United States	Nadine Ziemer; Germany	Zsuzsanna Klima; Hungary
Kumite open	Elisa Au; United States	Nadine Ziemer; Germany	Vanesca Nortan; Netherlands
Team kumite	Turkey; Yıldız Aras; Gülderen Çelik; Vildan Doğan; Meral Ölmez	Spain; Gloria Casanova; Cristina Feo; Noelia Fernández; Estefanía García	France; Patricia Chéreau; Laurence Fischer; Nathalie Leroy; Nadia Mécheri
Team kumite	Turkey; Yıldız Aras; Gülderen Çelik; Vildan Doğan; Meral Ölmez	Spain; Gloria Casanova; Cristina Feo; Noelia Fernández; Estefanía García	Germany; Yasmina Benadda; Kora Knühmann; Alexandra Kurtz; Nadine Ziemer

== Medal table ==
* Host nation (Mexico)

Rank	Nation	Gold	Silver	Bronze	Total
1	Japan	4	1	0	5
2	England	2	1	0	3
3	Italy	2	0	2	4
3	United States	2	0	2	4
5	Turkey	2	0	1	3
6	France	1	4	5	10
7	Spain	1	2	4	7
8	Russia	1	0	3	4
9	Venezuela	1	0	2	3
10	Mexico*	1	0	1	2
11	Netherlands	0	2	1	3
12	Germany	0	1	3	4
13	Hungary	0	1	2	3
14	Iran	0	1	1	2
15	Bosnia and Herzegovina	0	1	0	1
15	Greece	0	1	0	1
15	Guatemala	0	1	0	1
15	Peru	0	1	0	1
19	Brazil	0	0	2	2
20	Argentina	0	0	1	1
20	Canada	0	0	1	1
20	Croatia	0	0	1	1
20	Denmark	0	0	1	1
20	Slovakia	0	0	1	1
Totals (24 entries)		17	17	34	68

== Participating nations ==
582 athletes from 79 nations competed.

- Algeria (1)
- Argentina (7)
- Australia (13)
- Austria (19)
- Bangladesh (1)
- Belgium (6)
- Bermuda (8)
- Bosnia and Herzegovina (15)
- Botswana (8)
- Brazil (13)
- Bulgaria (4)
- Canada (13)
- Chile (6)
- Chinese Taipei (6)
- Colombia (5)
- Congo (8)
- Costa Rica (3)
- Croatia (17)
- Cuba (2)
- Czech Republic (3)
- Denmark (4)
- Dominican Republic (4)
- Ecuador (7)
- Egypt (9)
- El Salvador (9)
- England (13)
- Estonia (3)
- Fiji (3)
- Finland (4)
- France (22)
- Germany (15)
- Greece (7)
- Guatemala (7)
- Hong Kong (8)
- Hungary (3)
- Iceland (2)
- Indonesia (6)
- Iran (12)
- Ireland (4)
- Italy (15)
- Japan (20)
- Kazakhstan (1)
- Latvia (2)
- Luxembourg (3)
- Macau (4)
- Macedonia (5)
- Malaysia (7)
- Mexico (21)
- Morocco (1)
- Nepal (1)
- Netherlands (10)
- Netherlands Antilles (2)
- New Zealand (2)
- Norway (8)
- Panama (5)
- Peru (5)
- Philippines (8)
- Portugal (3)
- Puerto Rico (2)
- Qatar (3)
- Russia (12)
- San Marino (1)
- Scotland (8)
- Senegal (14)
- Serbia and Montenegro (14)
- Slovakia (7)
- Slovenia (2)
- South Africa (15)
- South Korea (18)
- Spain (21)
- Sweden (1)
- Switzerland (6)
- Tunisia (8)
- Turkey (15)
- United States (11)
- Uzbekistan (3)
- Venezuela (11)
- Vietnam (5)
- Wales (2)
