= 2022 European Karate Championships – Men's 84 kg =

European Karate Championship

Men's 84 kg at the 2022 European Karate Championships
- Venue: Karataş Şahinbey Sport Hall
- Location: Gaziantep, Turkey
- Dates: 25–28 May
- Competitors: 38 from 38 nations

Medalists
gold medal	Dániel György	Hungary
silver medal	Enes Garibović	Croatia
bronze medal	Petar Spasenovski	North Macedonia
bronze medal	Walid Deghali	Belgium

The Men's 84 kg competition at the 2022 European Karate Championships was held from 25 to 28 May 2022.

== Results ==
=== Finals ===
Semifinals
(Croatia) Enes Garibović	3
(North Macedonia) Petar Spasenovski	0
(Hungary) Dániel György	2
(Belgium) Walid Deghali	1

Final
(Croatia) Enes Garibović	2
(Hungary) Dániel György	3

=== Repechage ===
Repechage 1
(Greece) Konstantinos Mastrogiannis	0
(Turkey) Murat Öz	2

Repechage 2
(Turkey) Murat Öz	1
(Portugal) Tomás Silva	0

Repechage 3
(Turkey) Murat Öz	3
(Slovakia) Adi Gyurík	2

Bronze medal
(Turkey) Murat Öz	0
(North Macedonia) Petar Spasenovski	2

Repechage 1
(Romania) Robert Minea	1
(Georgia (country)) Khvicha Kiparoidze	1

Repechage 2
(Georgia (country)) Khvicha Kiparoidze	0
(Ukraine) Valerii Chobotar	1

Repechage 3
(Ukraine) Valerii Chobotar	0
(Italy) Michele Martina	1

Bronze medal
(Italy) Michele Martina	1
(Belgium) Walid Deghali	2

=== Top half ===
==== Section 1 ====
Round of 64
(Croatia) Enes Garibović	4
(Greece) Konstantinos Mastrogiannis	0
(France) Jessie Da Costa	2
(Serbia) Vladimir Brežančić	3

Round of 32
(Croatia) Enes Garibović	3
(Turkey) Murat Öz	1
(Azerbaijan) Turgut Hasanov	3
(Portugal) Tomás Silva	9
(Serbia) Vladimir Brežančić	2
(Kosovo) Melos Gashi	0
(Poland) Dawid Sobkowiak	0
(Slovakia) Adi Gyurík	3

Round of 16
(Croatia) Enes Garibović	1
(Portugal) Tomás Silva	0
(Serbia) Vladimir Brežančić	0
(Slovakia) Adi Gyurík	3

Quarterfinals
(Croatia) Enes Garibović	2
(Slovakia) Adi Gyurík	1

==== Section 2 ====
Round of 64
(Slovenia) Aleks Klobasa	4
(Netherlands) Brian Timmermans	10

Round of 32
(Netherlands) Brian Timmermans	2
(Spain) José Ibáñez	4
(Bulgaria) Simeon Stoychev	1
(Albania) Alvin Karaqi	2
(Cyprus) Demetris Demetriades	2
(Bosnia and Herzegovina) Meris Muhović	6
(Austria) Luca Rettenbacher	0
(North Macedonia) Petar Spasenovski	3

Round of 16
(Spain) José Ibáñez	7
(Albania) Alvin Karaqi	2
(Bosnia and Herzegovina) Meris Muhović	0
(North Macedonia) Petar Spasenovski	1

Quarterfinals
(Spain) José Ibáñez	2
(North Macedonia) Petar Spasenovski	3

=== Bottom half ===
==== Section 3 ====
Round of 64
(Hungary) Dániel György	5
(Romania) Robert Minea	2
(Latvia) Dens Sadikovs	3
(Israel) David Isakov	0

Round of 32
(Hungary) Dániel György	2
(Georgia (country)) Khvicha Kiparoidze	1
(Ukraine) Valerii Chobotar	2
(Finland) Björn Kulovuori	0
(Latvia) Dens Sadikovs	3
(Sweden) Jimmy Haag	3
(Luxembourg) David Marques	1
(Italy) Michele Martina	5

Round of 16
(Hungary) Dániel György	1
(Ukraine) Valerii Chobotar	0
(Latvia) Dens Sadikovs	1
(Italy) Michele Martina	4

Quarterfinals
(Hungary) Dániel György	5
(Italy) Michele Martina	1

==== Section 4 ====
Round of 64
(Armenia) Hayk Karyan	0
(Montenegro) Nikola Malović	0

Round of 32
(Montenegro) Nikola Malović	8
(Switzerland) Marco Nani	0
(Belgium) Walid Deghali	4
(Norway) Adrian Lopez Salas	1
(Wales) Nathan Preece	0
(Germany) Janne Haubold	8
(Estonia) Mihkel Mets	3
(Denmark) Christoffer Nielsen	0

Round of 16
(Montenegro) Nikola Malović	3
(Belgium) Walid Deghali	3
(Germany) Janne Haubold	1
(Estonia) Mihkel Mets	0

Quarterfinals
(Belgium) Walid Deghali	6
(Germany) Janne Haubold	3
