= 2002 European Karate Championships =

Karate competition

- Location: Tallinn, Estonia
- Dates: 2–4 May

The 2002 European Karate Championships, the 37th edition, was held in Tallinn, Estonia from 2 to 4 May 2002.

== Medal table ==
* Host nation (Estonia)

Rank	Nation	Gold	Silver	Bronze	Total
1	France	8	2	6	16
2	Spain	3	4	5	12
3	Italy	2	5	2	9
4	Turkey	2	1	0	3
5	Bosnia and Herzegovina	1	0	0	1
5	Czech Republic	1	0	0	1
7	England	0	2	4	6
8	Yugoslavia	0	1	2	3
9	Netherlands	0	1	1	2
10	Slovakia	0	1	0	1
11	Russia	0	0	4	4
12	Germany	0	0	2	2
12	Greece	0	0	2	2
14	Bulgaria	0	0	1	1
14	Croatia	0	0	1	1
14	Finland	0	0	1	1
14	Luxembourg	0	0	1	1
14	Scotland	0	0	1	1
14	Switzerland	0	0	1	1
Totals (19 entries)		17	17	34	68

== Medallists ==
=== Men's competition ===
==== Individual ====
Event	Gold	Silver	Bronze
Kata	(Italy) Luca Valdesi	(Italy) Lucio Maurino	(France) Stéphane Marie (Spain) Manuel Rodríguez
Kumite –60 kg	(France) Cécil Boulesnane	(Italy) Francesco Ortu	(Bulgaria) Borislav Ivanov (Spain) David Luque
Kumite –65 kg	(France) Alexandre Biamonti	(Italy) Andrea Calzola	(Switzerland) Marco Caamano (England) Jason Ledgister
Kumite –70 kg	(Turkey) Haldun Alagaş	(Netherlands) Anthony Boelbaai	(France) Messaoud Hammou (Finland) Eki Luukka
Kumite –75 kg	(Spain) Iván Leal	(Italy) Salvatore Loria	(Russia) Anton Gavrilov (Greece) Konstantinos Papadopoulos
Kumite –80 kg	(Bosnia and Herzegovina) Denis Muhović	(Netherlands) Daniël Sabanovic	(Scotland) Ewan Robb (England) Davin Pack
Kumite +80 kg	(France) Seydina Baldé	(England) Leon Walters	(Italy) Davide Benetello (Russia) Alexander Gerunov
Kumite Open	(Spain) Serafin Blanco	(Turkey) Zeynel Çelik	(Federal Republic of Yugoslavia) Predrag Stojadinov (Russia) Alexander Gerunov

==== Team ====
Event	Gold	Silver	Bronze
Kata	Italy; Vincenzo Figuccio; Lucio Maurino; Luca Valdesi	Spain; Francisco Hernández; Víctor López; Fernando San José	France Germany; Michael Mack; Christian Esni; Benjamin Wolf
Kumite	France	Spain; Serafín Blanco; Tomás Herrero; Iván Leal; Francisco Martínez; David Ortega; Ángel Ramiro; Óscar Vázquez	England Russia

=== Women's competition ===
==== Individual ====
Event	Gold	Silver	Bronze
Kata	(Czech Republic) Petra Nová	(France) Myriam Szkudlarek	(France) Sabrina Buil (Spain) Miriam Cogolludo
Kumite –53 kg	(France) Nadia Mecheri	(Spain) Estefania García	(Germany) Kora Knühmann (Greece) Evdoxia Kosmidou
Kumite –60 kg	(Spain) Noelia Fernández	(Slovakia) Milica Ilčíková	(France) Nathalie Chereau (France) Nathalie Leroy
Kumite +60 kg	(France) Laurence Fischer	(England) Tania Weekes	(Luxembourg) Tessy Scholtes (Federal Republic of Yugoslavia) Snežana Pantić
Kumite Open	(Turkey) Yıldız Aras	(Italy) Roberta Mita	(France) Nathalie Leroy (Spain) Cristin Feo

==== Team ====
Event	Gold	Silver	Bronze
Kata	France	Spain; Miriam Cogolludo; Ruth Jiménez; Almudena Muñoz	Croatia Italy
Kumite	France	Yugoslavia	England Spain; Gloria Casanova; Cristina Feo; Estefanía García; Lucía Zamora
