= Karate at the 2005 World Games – Men's kumite 65 kg =

Men's kumite 65 kg at the 2005 World Games
- Venue: Kfraftzentrale
- Date: 23 July 2005
- Competitors: 7 from 7 nations

Medalists
1st place, gold medalist(s)		(Greece) Dimitrios Triantafyllis
2nd place, silver medalist(s)		(Venezuela) Luis Plumacher
3rd place, bronze medalist(s)		(Germany) Christian Grüner

The men's kumite 65 kg competition in karate at the 2005 World Games took place on 23 July 2005 at the Kfraftzentrale in Duisburg, Germany.

== Competition format ==
A total of 7 athletes entered the competition. In elimination round they fought in two groups. From this stage the best two athletes qualifies to the semifinals.

== Results ==
=== Elimination round ===
==== Group A ====
Rank	Athlete	B	W	D	L	Pts	Score
1	Dimitrios Triantafyllis (GRE)	2	2	0	0	4	11–4
2	Hassib Kanoun (TUN)	2	1	0	1	2	8–10
3	Leonard Kong (NZL)	2	0	0	2	0	7–12

	Score	
Hassib Kanoun (TUN)	6–5	Leonard Kong (NZL)
Dimitrios Triantafyllis (GRE)	6–2	Leonard Kong (NZL)
Dimitrios Triantafyllis (GRE)	5–2	Hassib Kanoun (TUN)

==== Group B ====
Rank	Athlete	B	W	D	L	Pts	Score
1	Luis Plumacher (VEN)	3	2	1	0	5	14–5
2	Christian Grüner (GER)	3	2	0	1	4	12–13
3	A'sem Abujamous (JOR)	3	1	0	2	2	3–8
4	Ádám Kovács (HUN)	3	0	1	2	1	8–11

	Score	
Ádám Kovács (HUN)	0–2	A'sem Abujamous (JOR)
Luis Plumacher (VEN)	8–1	Christian Grüner (GER)
Ádám Kovács (HUN)	3–3	Luis Plumacher (VEN)
A'sem Abujamous (JOR)	0–5	Christian Grüner (GER)
Ádám Kovács (HUN)	1–3	Christian Grüner (GER)
A'sem Abujamous (JOR)	5–6	Luis Plumacher (VEN)

=== Finals ===
Semifinals
Dimitrios Triantafyllis (GRE)	7
Christian Grüner (GER)	3
Luis Plumacher (VEN)	4
Hassib Kanoun (TUN)	3

Final
Dimitrios Triantafyllis (GRE)	4
Luis Plumacher (VEN)	3
Third place
Christian Grüner (GER)	3
Hassib Kanoun (TUN)	1
