= Karate at the 2001 World Games – Women's kumite +60 kg =

Karate women's kumite +60 kg at the 2001 World Games
- Venue: Tenno Town Gymnasium, Tenno, Akita, Japan
- Dates: 19 August 2001
- Competitors: 7 from 7 nations

Medalists
gold medal	(Japan) Emiko Honma
silver medal	(Luxembourg) Tessy Scholtes
bronze medal	(United Kingdom) Tania Weekes

The women's kumite +60 kg competition in karate at the 2001 World Games took place on 19 August 2001 at the Tenno Town Gymnasium in Tenno, Akita, Japan.

== Competition format ==
A total of 7 athletes entered the competition. In preliminary round they fought in two groups. Winners of this groups advanced to gold medal match. Second place athletes advanced to bronze medal match.

== Results ==
=== Preliminary round ===
==== Group A ====
Rank	Athlete	B	W	D	L	Pts	SP	JPN	NZL	AUT
1	Emiko Honma (JPN)	2	2	0	0	4	18		W	W
2	Sophie Savill (NZL)	2	1	0	1	2	6	W		W
3	Elisabeth Fuchs (AUT)	2	0	0	2	0	6	L	L	
	Tebogo Ngope (BOT)	DNS								

==== Group B ====
Rank	Athlete	B	W	D	L	Pts	SP	LUX	GBR	MEX
1	Tessy Scholtes (LUX)	2	1	1	0	3	12		D	W
2	Tania Weekes (GBR)	2	1	1	0	3	9	D		W
3	Leticia Espinosa (MEX)	2	0	0	2	0	2	L	L	

=== Finals ===
	Score	
Gold medal match
Emiko Honma (JPN)	5−3	Tessy Scholtes (LUX)
Bronze medal match
Sophie Savill (NZL)	4−7	Tania Weekes (GBR)
