= Karate at the 2005 World Games – Men's kumite +80 kg =

Men's kumite +80 kg at the 2005 World Games
- Venue: Kfraftzentrale
- Date: 23 July 2005
- Competitors: 8 from 7 nations

Medalists
1st place, gold medalist(s)		(Russia) Alexander Gerunov
2nd place, silver medalist(s)		(Germany) Felix Kühnle
3rd place, bronze medalist(s)		(Croatia) Alen Zamlić

The men's kumite +80 kg competition in karate at the 2005 World Games took place on 23 July 2005 at the Kfraftzentrale in Duisburg, Germany.

== Competition format ==
A total of 8 athletes entered the competition. In elimination round they fought in two groups. From this stage the best two athletes qualifies to the semifinals.

== Results ==
=== Elimination round ===
==== Group A ====
Rank	Athlete	B	W	D	L	Pts	Score
1	Alexander Gerunov (RUS)	3	3	0	0	6	21–0
2	Felix Kühnle (GER)	3	2	0	1	4	4–10
3	Stuart Kemp (NED)	3	1	0	2	2	5–8
4	Darren Brailey (AUS)	3	0	0	3	0	2–14

	Score	
Alexander Gerunov (RUS)	5–0	Stuart Kemp (NED)
Darren Brailey (AUS)	1–2	Felix Kühnle (GER)
Alexander Gerunov (RUS)	8–0	Darren Brailey (AUS)
Stuart Kemp (NED)	1–2	Felix Kühnle (GER)
Alexander Gerunov (RUS)	8–0	Felix Kühnle (GER)
Stuart Kemp (NED)	4–1	Darren Brailey (AUS)

==== Group B ====
Rank	Athlete	B	W	D	L	Pts	Score
1	Alen Zamlić (CRO)	3	3	0	0	6	8–2
2	Enrico Höhne (GER)	3	2	0	1	4	8–5
3	Syarif Mochamad Umar (INA)	3	1	0	2	2	6–10
4	Andrew Dobolo (BOT)	3	0	0	3	0	2–7

	Score	
Alen Zamlić (CRO)	4–1	Syarif Mochamad Umar (INA)
Andrew Dobolo (BOT)	0–3	Enrico Höhne (GER)
Alen Zamlić (CRO)	2–1	Andrew Dobolo (BOT)
Syarif Mochamad Umar (INA)	3–5	Enrico Höhne (GER)
Alen Zamlić (CRO)	2–0	Enrico Höhne (GER)
Syarif Mochamad Umar (INA)	2–1	Andrew Dobolo (BOT)

=== Finals ===
Semifinals
Alexander Gerunov (RUS)	8
Enrico Höhne (GER)	0
Alen Zamlić (CRO)	1
Felix Kühnle (GER)	5

Final
Alexander Gerunov (RUS)	8
Felix Kühnle (GER)	0
Third place
Enrico Höhne (GER)	0
Alen Zamlić (CRO)	2
