= Karate at the 2005 World Games – Men's kata =

Karate competition

Men's kata at the 2005 World Games
- Venue: Kfraftzentrale
- Date: 24 July 2005
- Competitors: 8 from 8 nations

Medalists
1st place, gold medalist(s)		(Venezuela) Antonio Díaz
2nd place, silver medalist(s)		(Italy) Luca Valdesi
3rd place, bronze medalist(s)		(Peru) Akio Tamashiro

The men's kata competition in karate at the 2005 World Games took place on 24 July 2005 at the Kfraftzentrale in Duisburg, Germany.

== Competition format ==
A total of 8 athletes entered the competition. In elimination round they fought in two groups. From this stage the best two athletes qualifies to the semifinals.

== Results ==
=== Elimination round ===
==== Group A ====
Rank	Athlete	B	W	D	L	Pts	Score
1	Akio Tamashiro (PER)	3	3	0	0	6	7–2
2	Timo Gißler (GER)	3	2	0	1	4	6–3
3	Toshihide Uchiage (CAN)	3	1	0	2	2	3–6
4	Lee Ta-chiun (TPE)	3	0	0	3	0	2–7

	Score	
Timo Gißler (GER)	2–1	Toshihide Uchiage (CAN)
Lee Ta-chiun (TPE)	1–2	Akio Tamashiro (PER)
Timo Gißler (GER)	3–0	Lee Ta-chiun (TPE)
Toshihide Uchiage (CAN)	0–3	Akio Tamashiro (PER)
Timo Gißler (GER)	1–2	Akio Tamashiro (PER)
Toshihide Uchiage (CAN)	2–1	Lee Ta-chiun (TPE)

==== Group B ====
Rank	Athlete	B	W	D	L	Pts	Score
1	Luca Valdesi (ITA)	3	3	0	0	6	8–1
2	Antonio Díaz (VEN)	3	2	0	1	4	7–2
3	Karim Abd El-Hamid (EGY)	3	1	0	2	2	3–6
4	Tim Jovanovic (AUS)	3	0	0	3	0	0–9

	Score	
Antonio Díaz (VEN)	3–0	Tim Jovanovic (AUS)
Luca Valdesi (ITA)	3–0	Karim Abd El-Hamid (EGY)
Antonio Díaz (VEN)	1–2	Luca Valdesi (ITA)
Tim Jovanovic (AUS)	0–3	Karim Abd El-Hamid (EGY)
Antonio Díaz (VEN)	3–0	Karim Abd El-Hamid (EGY)
Tim Jovanovic (AUS)	0–3	Luca Valdesi (ITA)

=== Finals ===
Semifinals
Akio Tamashiro (PER)	0
Antonio Díaz (VEN)	3
Luca Valdesi (ITA)	3
Timo Gißler (GER)	0

Final
Antonio Díaz (VEN)	3
Luca Valdesi (ITA)	2
Third place
Akio Tamashiro (PER)	2
Timo Gißler (GER)	1
