= Heidy Rodríguez =

Heidy Rodríguez may refer to:

- Heidy Rodríguez (karateka) (born 1981), karateka from the Dominican Republic
- Heidy Rodríguez (volleyball) (born 1993), Cuban volleyball player
