= Karate at the 2005 World Games – Men's kumite open =

Men's kumite open at the 2005 World Games
- Venue: Kfraftzentrale
- Date: 24 July 2005
- Competitors: 8 from 8 nations

Medalists
1st place, gold medalist(s)		(Russia) Alexander Gerunov
2nd place, silver medalist(s)		(Japan) Shinji Nagaki
3rd place, bronze medalist(s)		(Egypt) Mohamed El-Shemy

The men's kumite open competition in karate at the 2005 World Games took place on 24 July 2005 at the Kfraftzentrale in Duisburg, Germany.

== Competition format ==
A total of 8 athletes entered the competition. In elimination round they fought in two groups. From this stage the best two athletes qualifies to the semifinals.

== Results ==
=== Elimination round ===
==== Group A ====
Rank	Athlete	B	W	D	L	Pts	Score
1	Shinji Nagaki (JPN)	3	3	0	0	6	13–8
2	Mohamed El-Shemy (EGY)	3	2	0	1	4	19–11
3	Salvatore Loria (ITA)	3	1	0	2	2	17–15
4	Syarif Mochamad Umar (INA)	3	0	0	3	0	4–19

	Score	
Mohamed El-Shemy (EGY)	4–5	Shinji Nagaki (JPN)
Salvatore Loria (ITA)	8–3	Syarif Mochamad Umar (INA)
Mohamed El-Shemy (EGY)	7–6	Salvatore Loria (ITA)
Shinji Nagaki (JPN)	3–1	Syarif Mochamad Umar (INA)
Mohamed El-Shemy (EGY)	8–0	Syarif Mochamad Umar (INA)
Shinji Nagaki (JPN)	5–3	Salvatore Loria (ITA)

==== Group B ====
Rank	Athlete	B	W	D	L	Pts	Score
1	Alexander Gerunov (RUS)	3	3	0	0	6	15–4
2	Saeed Bachbani (CAN)	3	1	1	1	3	10–12
3	Thomas Budich (GER)	3	1	1	1	3	9–12
4	Darren Brailey (AUS)	3	0	0	3	0	4–10

	Score	
Saeed Bachbani (CAN)	3–6	Alexander Gerunov (RUS)
Darren Brailey (AUS)	2–4	Thomas Budich (GER)
Saeed Bachbani (CAN)	3–2	Darren Brailey (AUS)
Alexander Gerunov (RUS)	6–1	Thomas Budich (GER)
Saeed Bachbani (CAN)	4–4	Thomas Budich (GER)
Alexander Gerunov (RUS)	3–0	Darren Brailey (AUS)

=== Finals ===
Semifinals
Shinji Nagaki (JPN)	7
Saeed Bachbani (CAN)	6
Alexander Gerunov (RUS)	5
Mohamed El-Shemy (EGY)	4

Final
Shinji Nagaki (JPN)	3
Alexander Gerunov (RUS)	5
Third place
Saeed Bachbani (CAN)	3
Mohamed El-Shemy (EGY)	6
