= Karate at the 2001 World Games – Men's kumite 60 kg =

Karate men's kumite 60 kg at the 2001 World Games
- Venue: Tenno Town Gymnasium, Tenno, Akita, Japan
- Dates: 18 August 2001
- Competitors: 7 from 6 nations

Medalists
gold medal	(Japan) Kenichi Imai
silver medal	(Italy) Francesco Ortu
bronze medal	(United Kingdom) Milo Hodge

The men's kumite 60 kg competition in karate at the 2001 World Games took place on 18 August 2001 at the Tenno Town Gymnasium in Tenno, Akita, Japan.

== Competition format ==
A total of 7 athletes entered the competition. In preliminary round they fought in two groups. Winners of this groups advanced to gold medal match. Second place athletes advanced to bronze medal match.

== Results ==
=== Preliminary round ===
==== Group A ====
Rank	Athlete	B	W	D	L	Pts	SP	ITA	GBR	USA
1	Francesco Ortu (ITA)	2	2	0	0	4	14		W	W
2	Milo Hodge (GBR)	2	1	0	1	2	6	L		W
3	Adam Brozer (USA)	2	0	0	2	0	4	L	L	

==== Group B ====
Rank	Athlete	B	W	D	L	Pts	SP	JPN	VEN	GBR	AUS
1	Kenichi Imai (JPN)	3	3	0	0	6	14		W	W	W
2	Carlos Luces (VEN)	3	2	0	1	4	7	L		W	W
3	Paul Newby (GBR)	3	1	0	2	2	6	L	L		W
4	Les Aberley (AUS)	3	0	0	3	0	2	L	L	L	

=== Finals ===
	Score	
Gold medal match
Francesco Ortu (ITA)	4−5	Kenichi Imai (JPN)
Bronze medal match
Milo Hodge (GBR)	10−2	Carlos Luces (VEN)
