= Karate at the 2005 World Games – Women's kumite 60 kg =

Women's kumite 60 kg at the 2005 World Games
- Venue: Kfraftzentrale
- Date: 24 July 2005
- Competitors: 8 from 8 nations

Medalists
1st place, gold medalist(s)		(Serbia and Montenegro) Snežana Perić
2nd place, silver medalist(s)		(Germany) Maria Musall
3rd place, bronze medalist(s)		(Bosnia and Herzegovina) Lejla Ferhatbegović

The women's kumite 60 kg competition in karate at the 2005 World Games took place on 24 July 2005 at the Kfraftzentrale in Duisburg, Germany.

== Competition format ==
A total of 8 athletes entered the competition. In elimination round they fought in two groups. From this stage the best two athletes qualifies to the semifinals.

== Results ==
=== Elimination round ===
==== Group A ====
Rank	Athlete	B	W	D	L	Pts	Score
1	Snežana Perić (SCG)	3	2	1	0	5	7–3
2	Maria Musall (GER)	3	2	0	1	4	8–6
3	Natasha Hardy (AUS)	3	0	2	1	2	8–10
4	Danielys Nuñez (VEN)	3	0	1	2	1	6–10

	Score	
Natasha Hardy (AUS)	4–6	Maria Musall (GER)
Snežana Perić (SCG)	5–2	Danielys Nuñez (VEN)
Natasha Hardy (AUS)	1–1	Snežana Perić (SCG)
Maria Musall (GER)	2–1	Danielys Nuñez (VEN)
Natasha Hardy (AUS)	3–3	Danielys Nuñez (VEN)
Maria Musall (GER)	0–1	Snežana Perić (SCG)

==== Group B ====
Rank	Athlete	B	W	D	L	Pts	Score
1	Yuko Takahashi (JPN)	3	3	0	0	6	18–12
2	Lejla Ferhatbegović (BIH)	3	1	0	2	2	12–13
3	Yadira Lira (MEX)	3	1	0	2	2	11–15
4	Julia Gehring (GER)	3	1	0	2	2	9–10

	Score	
Yuko Takahashi (JPN)	4–3	Julia Gehring (GER)
Yadira Lira (MEX)	5–3	Lejla Ferhatbegović (BIH)
Yuko Takahashi (JPN)	7–4	Yadira Lira (MEX)
Julia Gehring (GER)	1–4	Lejla Ferhatbegović (BIH)
Yuko Takahashi (JPN)	7–5	Lejla Ferhatbegović (BIH)
Julia Gehring (GER)	5–2	Yadira Lira (MEX)

=== Finals ===
Semifinals
Snežana Perić (SCG)	5
Lejla Ferhatbegović (BIH)	2
Yuko Takahashi (JPN)	11
Maria Musall (GER)	12

Final
Snežana Perić (SCG)	3
Maria Musall (GER)	1
Third place
Lejla Ferhatbegović (BIH)	5
Yuko Takahashi (JPN)	4
