= Karate at the 2009 World Games – Men's kumite 70 kg =

Karate competition

The men's 70 kg tournament in karate at the 2009 World Games was held on July 25 at the National Sun Yat-Sen University Gymnasium.

== Medalists ==
1st place, gold medalist(s)	Jean Pena (VEN)
2nd place, silver medalist(s)	Shinji Nagaki (JPN)
3rd place, bronze medalist(s)	Tamer Morsy (EGY)

== Round robin ==
=== Group A ===
Rank	Athlete	W	D	L
1	Hung Chiacheng (TPE)	2	0	0
2	Shinji Nagaki (JPN)	1	0	1
3	Dimitrios Triantafyllis (GRE)	0	0	2

	TPE	JPN	GRE
Hung (TPE)		2–0	2–0
Nagaki (JPN)	0–2		2–0
Triantafyllis (GRE)	0–2	0–2	

=== Group B ===
Rank	Athlete	W	D	L
1	Tamer Morsy (EGY)	2	0	1
2	Jean Peсa (VEN)	2	0	1
3	Leon Romary (AUS)	2	0	1
4	Ivan Skrablin (CRO)	0	0	3

	EGY	VEN	AUS	CRO
Morsy (EGY)		2–0	0–2	2–0
Peсa (VEN)	0–2		2–0	2–0
Romary (AUS)	2–0	0–2		2–0
Skrablin (CRO)	0–2	0–2	0–2	

== Knock-out stage ==
Semifinals
A2	Nagaki (JPN)	4
B1	Morsy (EGY)	2
B2	Peсa (VEN)	4
A1	Hung (TPE)	1

Gold medal fight
A2	Nagaki (JPN)	2
B2	Peсa (VEN)	3
Bronze medal fight
B1	Morsy (EGY)	4
A1	Hung (TPE)	0
