= Denis Muhović =

Bosnian karateka (born 1976)

- Born: 27 August 1976 (age 50); Pristina, SR Serbia, SFR Yugoslavia
- Style: Shotokan
- Teacher: Suad Ćupina
- Rank: Black Belt, 7th dan

Other information
- Notable students: Meris Muhović

Denis Muhović (born 27 August 1976) is a Bosnian retired karateka.

== Personal life ==
Denis is the older brother of fellow karateka Meris Muhović, who he also coached.

== Championships and awards ==
- European Championships
  - 2002 European Karate Championships (gold) Kumite -80 kg

Awards

- Bosnian Sportsman of the Year: 2002
