= Karate at the 2009 World Games – Men's kumite 75 kg =

Karate competition

The men's 75 kg tournament in karate at the 2009 World Games was held on July 25 at the National Sun Yat-Sen University Gymnasium.

== Medalists ==
| 1st place, gold medalist(s) | Michael-Georgios Tzanos (GRE) |
| 2nd place, silver medalist(s) | Diego Vandeschrick (BEL) |
| 3rd place, bronze medalist(s) | Kou Matsuhisa (JPN) |

== Round robin ==
=== Group A ===
| Rank | Athlete | W | D | L |
|---|---|---|---|---|
| 1 | Diego Vandeschrick (BEL) | 2 | 0 | 0 |
| 2 | Michael-Georgios Tzanos (GRE) | 1 | 0 | 1 |
| 3 | David Dubу (CHI) | 0 | 0 | 2 |

| | BEL | GRE | CHI |
|---|---|---|---|
| Vandeschrick (BEL) | | 2–0 | 2–0 |
| Tzanos (GRE) | 0–2 | | 2–0 |
| Dubу (CHI) | 0–2 | 0–2 | |

=== Group B ===
| Rank | Athlete | W | D | L |
|---|---|---|---|---|
| 1 | Kou Matsuhisa (JPN) | 3 | 0 | 0 |
| 2 | Andreas Beck (GER) | 2 | 0 | 1 |
| 3 | Muslum Bastürk (TUR) | 1 | 0 | 2 |
| 4 | Cheng Yushun (TPE) | 0 | 0 | 3 |

| | JPN | GER | TUR | TPE |
|---|---|---|---|---|
| Matsuhisa (JPN) | | 2–0 | 0–2 | 2–0 |
| Beck (GER) | 0–2 | | 2–0 | 2–0 |
| Bastürk (TUR) | 2–0 | 0–2 | | 2–0 |
| Cheng (TPE) | 0–2 | 0–2 | 0–2 | |

== Knock-out stage ==
Semifinals
A2 | Tzanos (GRE) | 9
B1 | Matsuhisa (JPN) | 7
B2 | Beck (GER) | 2
A1 | Vandeschrick (BEL) | 3

Gold medal fight
A2 | Tzanos (GRE) | 3
A1 | Vandeschrick (BEL) | 1
Bronze medal fight
B1 | Matsuhisa (JPN) | 8
B2 | Beck (GER) | 0
