= Nelson Sardenberg =

Brazilian karateka (born 1970)

Medal record

Karate

Representing Brazil

Pan American Games
| Silver medal – second place | 1999 Winnipeg | Kumite |
| Silver medal – second place | 2003 Santo Domingo | Kumite |
| Bronze medal – third place | 2007 Rio de Janeiro | Kumite |

Nelson Luiz Bittencourt Sardenberg (born August 1, 1970 in Belo Horizonte) is a Brazilian karate fighter.

In 1999, Nelson was defeated on the final of the 1999 Pan American Games in Winnipeg by the American John Fonseca.

In 2002, fighting for the Pan-American Championship, Nelson had his jaw broken and required a surgical intervention.

In 2003, Nelson was defeated by the American John Fonseca on the final of the 2003 Pan American Games in Santo Domingo.
