= Meris Muhović =

Bosnian karateka (born 1992)

- Born: 13 January 1992 (age 34); Sarajevo, SR Bosnia and Herzegovina, SFR Yugoslavia
- Style: Shotokan
- Teachers: Denis Muhović; Masao Kagawa
- Rank: Black Belt, 4th dan

Meris Muhović (born 13 January 1992) is a Bosnian karateka.

== Personal life ==
Meris is the younger brother of Karate European gold medalist Denis Muhović, who was also his coach.

== Championships ==
- European Championships
  - 2016 European Karate Championships (silver) Kumite -84 kg
  - 2014 European Karate Championships (bronze) Kumite -84 kg
  - 2013 European Karate Championships (silver) Team kumite
- World Cup
  - 2016 World Cup (gold) Kumite -84 kg
- Premier League
  - 2015 Premier League (bronze) Kumite -84 kg
