= 2024 European Karate Championships – Men's 84 kg =

European Karate Championship

Men's 84 kg at the 2024 European Karate Championships
- Venue: Krešimir Ćosić Hall
- Location: Zadar, Croatia
- Dates: 10–11 May
- Competitors: 35 from 35 nations

Medalists
gold medal	Konstantinos Mastrogiannis	Greece
silver medal	Brian Timmermans	Netherlands
bronze medal	Ivan Kvesić	Croatia
bronze medal	Valerii Chobotar	Ukraine

The men's 84 kg competition at the 2024 European Karate Championships was held from 10 to 11 May 2024.

== Results ==
=== Final ===
Final
Konstantinos Mastrogiannis (GRE)	7
Brian Timmermans (NED)	2

=== Top half ===
Round of 64
	Score	
Aleksandar Novicki (BIH)	3-0	Luca Weingötz (GER)
Luka Vasadze (GEO)	4-1	Simeon Stoychev (BUL)

Round of 32
Aleksandar Novicki (BIH)	2
Julián Smoliga (SVK)	5
Matej Gorišek (SLO)	4
Jáchym Tinavský (CZE)	4
Aidan Docherty (ENG)	1
Hleb Sachkouski (ANA)	9
Gonçalo Freitas (POR)	0
Ivan Kvesić (CRO)	9
Luka Vasadze (GEO)	3
Kelly Anthony (IRL)	0
Walid Deghali (BEL)	3
Alejandro Arencón (ESP)	4
Alvin Karaqi (ALB)	1
Jakup Ajdari (KOS)	0
Dens Sadikovs (LAT)	1
Konstantinos Mastrogiannis (GRE)	2

Round of 16
Julián Smoliga (SVK)	9
Matej Gorišek (SLO)	1
Hleb Sachkouski (ANA)	0
Ivan Kvesić (CRO)	5
Luka Vasadze (GEO)	3
Alejandro Arencón (ESP)	7
Jakup Ajdari (KOS)	0
Konstantinos Mastrogiannis (GRE)	4

Quarterfinals
Julián Smoliga (SVK)	3
Ivan Kvesić (CRO)	11
Alejandro Arencón (ESP)	1
Konstantinos Mastrogiannis (GRE)	2

Semifinals
Ivan Kvesić (CRO)	6
Konstantinos Mastrogiannis (GRE)	6

=== Bottom half ===
Round of 64
	Score	
Botond Botos (HUN)	0-5	Dany Makamata (FRA)

Round of 32
Dany Makamata (FRA)	1
Björn Kulovuori (FIN)	4
Marian Mihalache (ROU)	2
Hasan Arslan (TUR)	6
Mads Viberg Larsen (DEN)	0
Vladimir Brežančić (SRB)	3
Nikola Malović (MNE)	1
Michele Martina (ITA)	0
Nathan Preece (WAL)	0
Turgut Hasanov (AZE)	8
Petar Spasenovski (MKD)	7
Adrian Lopez Salas (NOR)	4
Loizos Vasiliou (CYP)	4
Gor Nersisyan (ARM)	1
Brian Timmermans (NED)	0
Valerii Chobotar (UKR)	0

Round of 16
Björn Kulovuori (FIN)	6
Hasan Arslan (TUR)	9
Vladimir Brežančić (SRB)	2
Nikola Malović (MNE)	0
Turgut Hasanov (AZE)	3
Petar Spasenovski (MKD)	1
Loizos Vasiliou (CYP)	0
Brian Timmermans (NED)	2

Quarterfinals
Hasan Arslan (TUR)	6
Vladimir Brežančić (SRB)	5
Turgut Hasanov (AZE)	1
Brian Timmermans (NED)	3

Semifinals
Hasan Arslan (TUR)	3
Brian Timmermans (NED)	3

=== Repechage ===
Repechage round 1
Jakup Ajdari (KOS)	0
Dens Sadikovs (LAT)	1
Loizos Vasiliou (CYP)	2
Valerii Chobotar (UKR)	4

Repechage round 2
Dens Sadikovs (LAT)	0
Alejandro Arencón (ESP)	1
Turgut Hasanov (AZE)	4
Valerii Chobotar (UKR)	5

Bronze medals
Ivan Kvesić (CRO)	7
Alejandro Arencón (ESP)	0
Hasan Arslan (TUR)	0
Valerii Chobotar (UKR)	1
