= Bosnia and Herzegovina Sportsperson of the Year =

Bosnia and Herzegovina Sportsperson of the Year (Bosnian: Sportista godine Bosne i Hercegovine) are annual sporting awards given to best athletes of Bosnia and Herzegovina by Banja Luka-based newspaper Nezavisne novine.

== List of winners ==
Year	Sportsman of the Year		Sportswoman of the Year		Team of the Year		Coach of the Year	
Year	Winner	Sport	Winner	Sport	Winner	Sport	Winner	Sport
2001	Hasan Salihamidžić	Football	N/A (Note: The Sportswoman of the Year was first awarded in 2007.)		FK Željezničar	Football	Suad Ćupina	Karate
2002	Denis Muhović	Karate	N/A		Chess club Bosna	Chess	Amar Osim	Football
2003	Lejla Ferhatbegović	Karate	N/A		Men's national karate team	Karate	Blaž Slišković	Football
2004	Đorđe Paštar	Bowling	N/A		RK Izviđač	Handball	Mensur Bajramović	Basketball
2005	Markica Dodig	Bocce	N/A		RK Izviđač (2)	Handball	Mensur Bajramović (2)	Basketball
2006	Enid Tahirović	Handball	N/A		RK Bosna Sarajevo	Handball	Halid Demirović	Handball
2007	Markica Dodig (2)	Bocce	Arnela Odžaković	Karate	RK Bosna Sarajevo (2)	Handball	Zoran Mikeš	Basketball
2008	Memnun Hadžić	Boxing	Lucia Kimani	Athletics	RK Bosna Sarajevo (3)	Handball	Almedin Fetahović	Boxing
2009	Edin Džeko	Football	Larisa Cerić	Judo	Men's national football team	Football	Miroslav Blažević	Football
2010	Nermin Potur	Karate	Larisa Cerić (2)	Judo	Men's national karate team (2)	Karate	Suad Ćupina (2)	Karate
2011	Amel Mekić	Judo	Dragana Knežević	Handball	Men's national football team (2)	Football	Branimir Crnogorac	Judo
2012	Mirza Teletović	Basketball	Ivana Ninković	Swimming	Men's national basketball team	Basketball	Aleksandar Petrović	Basketball
2013	Zvjezdan Misimović	Football	Larisa Cerić (3)	Judo	Men's national football team (3)	Football	Safet Sušić	Football
2014	Nikola Prce	Handball	Larisa Cerić (4)	Judo	Men's national handball team	Handball	Dragan Marković	Handball
2015	Amel Tuka	Athletics	Aleksandra Samardžić	Judo	Men's national U16 basketball team	Basketball	Josip Pandža	Basketball
2016	Mirsad Terzić	Handball	Ivona Ćavar	Karate	National Davis Cup team	Tennis	Samira Hurem	Football
2017	Damir Džumhur	Tennis	Larisa Cerić (5)	Judo	KK Igokea	Basketball	Branislav Crnogorac (2)	Judo
2018	Edin Džeko (2)	Football	Larisa Cerić (6)	Judo	Men's national football team (4)	Football	Blaž Slišković (2)	Football
2019	Amel Tuka (2)	Athletics	Larisa Cerić (7)	Judo	Men's national handball team (2)	Handball	Bilal Šuman	Handball
2020	Miralem Pjanić	Football	Marica Gajić	Basketball	Women's national basketball team	Basketball	Goran Lojo	Basketball
2021	Nedžad Husić	Taekwondo	Jonquel Jones	Basketball	Women's national basketball team (2)	Basketball	Goran Lojo (2)	Basketball
2022	Džanan Musa	Basketball	Lana Pudar	Swimming	Women's national volleyball team	Volleyball	Goran Grahovac	Swimming
2023	Džanan Musa (2)	Basketball	Lana Pudar (2)	Swimming	HŠK Zrinjski	Football	Goran Grahovac (2)	Swimming
2024	Nedžad Husić (2)	Taekwondo	Lana Pudar (3)	Swimming	Men's national basketball team (2)	Basketball	Damir Đedović	Swimming
2025	Edin Atić	Basketball	Lana Pudar (4)	Swimming	Men's national basketball team (3)	Basketball	Adis Bećiragić	Basketball
