= Karate at the 2009 World Games =

Karate competition

The karate competition at the World Games 2009 took place from July 25 to July 26, at the National Sun Yat-Sen University Gymnasium in Kaohsiung, Taiwan.

== Men's events ==
| Event | Gold | Silver | Bronze |
|---|---|---|---|
| Kata | Luca Valdesi (ITA) | Vu Duc Minh Dack (FRA) | Antonio Díaz (VEN) |
| Kumite −60 kg | Douglas Brose (BRA) | Hsia Wen-haung (TPE) | Danil Domdjoni (CRO) |
| Kumite −65 kg | Ádám Kovács (HUN) | William Rolle (FRA) | Ömer Kemaloğlu (TUR) |
| Kumite −70 kg | Jean Peсa (VEN) | Shinji Nagaki (JPN) | Tamer Morsy (EGY) |
| Kumite −75 kg | Georgios Tzanos (GRE) | Diego Vandeschrick (BEL) | Kou Matsuhisa (JPN) |
| Kumite −80 kg | Huang Hao-yun (TPE) | Islamutdin Eldaruchev (RUS) | Konstantinos Papadopoulos (GRE) |
| Kumite +80 kg | Jonathan Horne (GER) | Spyridon Margaritopoulos (GRE) | Almir Cecunjanin (MNE) |
| Kumite open | Khalid Khalidov (KAZ) | Kestha Hany (EGY) | Almir Cecunjanin (MNE) |

== Women's events ==
| Event | Gold | Silver | Bronze |
|---|---|---|---|
| Kata | Nguyễn Hoàng Ngân (VIE) | María Dimitrova (DOM) | Sara Battaglia (ITA) |
| Kumite −53 kg | Jelena Kovačević (CRO) | Chen Yen-hui (TPE) | Gülderen Çelik (TUR) |
| Kumite −60 kg | Maria Sobol (RUS) | Eva Tulejová-Medveďová (SVK) | Chang Ting (TPE) |
| Kumite +60 kg | Arnela Odžaković (BIH) | Tiffany Fanjat (FRA) | Silvia Sperner (GER) |
| Kumite open | Eva Medvedová-Tulejová (SVK) | Letitia Carr (NZL) | Ema Aničić (CRO) |
