= Karate at the 2023 European Games – Men's kumite 84 kg =

Men's kumite 84 kg at the 2023 European Games
- Venue: Bielsko-Biała Arena
- Date: 23 June
- Competitors: 8 from 8 nations

Medalists
gold medal	Alvin Karaqi	Albania
silver medal	Brian Timmermans	Netherlands
bronze medal	Michał Bąbos	Poland
bronze medal	Michele Martina	Italy

The men's kumite 84 kg competition at the 2023 European Games was held on 23 June 2023 at the Bielsko-Biała Arena.

== Results ==
=== Elimination round ===
Pool A

Pos	Athlete	B	W	D	D^{0}	L	Pts	Score	(Poland)	(Albania)	(Greece)	(Croatia)
1	Michał Bąbos (POL)	3	2	0	0	1	6 (Note: Bąbos (POL) 5–3 Karaqi (ALB))	10–14	—	5–3	5–4	0–7
2	Alvin Karaqi (ALB)	3	2	0	0	1	6	6–5	3–5	—	1–0	2–0
3	Konstantinos Mastrogiannis (GRE)	3	1	0	0	2	3 (Note: Mastrogiannis (GRE) 2–0 Garibović (CRO))	6–6	4–5	0–1	—	2–0
4	Enes Garibović (CRO)	3	1	0	0	2	3	7–4	7–0	0–2	0–2	—

Source: EG2023
Notes:

Pool B

Pos	Athlete	B	W	D	D^{0}	L	Pts	Score	(Italy)	(Netherlands)	(Ukraine)	(Georgia (country))
1	Michele Martina (ITA)	3	2	0	0	1	6 (Note: Martina (ITA) 3–1 Timmermans (NED))	16–8	—	3–1	3–5	10–2
2	Brian Timmermans (NED)	3	2	0	0	1	6	5–4	1–3	—	1–0	3–1
3	Valerii Chobotar (UKR)	3	1	1	0	1	4	6–5	5–3	0–1	—	1–1
4	Khvicha Kiparoidze (GEO)	3	0	1	0	2	1	4–14	2–10	1–3	1–1	—

Source: EG2023

=== Finals ===
Semifinals
Brian Timmermans (NED)	6
Michał Bąbos (POL)	1
Alvin Karaqi (ALB)	3
Michele Martina (ITA)	2

Gold medal bout
Brian Timmermans (NED)	2
Alvin Karaqi (ALB)	3
