= 2023 European Karate Championships – Men's 84 kg =

European Karate Championship

Men's 84 kg at the 2023 European Karate Championships
- Venue: Palacio Multiusos de Guadalajara
- Location: Guadalajara, Spain
- Dates: 22, 25 March
- Competitors: 38 from 38 nations

Medalists
gold medal	Michele Martina	Italy
silver medal	Enes Garibović	Croatia
bronze medal	Konstantinos Mastrogiannis	Greece
bronze medal	Brian Timmermans	Netherlands

The Men's 84 kg competition at the 2023 European Karate Championships was held on 22 and 25 March 2023.

== Results ==
=== Finals ===
Semifinals
(Greece) Konstantinos Mastrogiannis	1
(Italy) Michele Martina	3
(Croatia) Enes Garibović	2
(Netherlands) Brian Timmermans	2

Final
(Italy) Michele Martina	3
(Croatia) Enes Garibović	1

=== Repechage ===
Repechage 1
(Slovakia) Adi Gyurík	2
(Bosnia and Herzegovina) Mahir Džuho	0

Repechage 2
(Slovakia) Adi Gyurík	1
(Albania) Alvin Karaqi	0

Bronze medal
(Slovakia) Adi Gyurík	0
(Greece) Konstantinos Mastrogiannis	4

Repechage 1
(England) Joe Kellaway	1
(Georgia (country)) Luka Vasadze	6

Repechage 2
(Georgia (country)) Luka Vasadze	1
(Austria) Luca Rettenbacher	1

Bronze medal
(Georgia (country)) Luka Vasadze	2
(Netherlands) Brian Timmermans	5

=== Top half ===
==== Section 1 ====
Round of 64
(Turkey) Uğur Aktaş	5
(Serbia) Vladimir Brežančić	4
(Romania) Robert Minea	3
(Bulgaria) Simeon Stoychev	0

Round of 32
(Turkey) Uğur Aktaş	4
(Latvia) Dens Sadikovs	4
(Norway) Adrian Lopez Salas	2
(Azerbaijan) Turgut Hasanov	3
(Romania) Robert Minea	9
(Slovenia) Timotej Jordan	1
(Luxembourg) David Marques	1
(Greece) Konstantinos Mastrogiannis	2

Round of 16
(Latvia) Dens Sadikovs	2
(Azerbaijan) Turgut Hasanov	1
(Romania) Robert Minea	0
(Greece) Konstantinos Mastrogiannis	3

Quarterfinals
(Latvia) Dens Sadikovs	0
(Greece) Konstantinos Mastrogiannis	2

==== Section 2 ====
Round of 64
(Czech Republic) Jáchym Tinavský	3
(Germany) Janne Haubold	3

Round of 32
(Czech Republic) Jáchym Tinavský	2
(Armenia) Davit Makyan	3
(Albania) Alvin Karaqi	1
(Finland) Björn Kulovuori	0
(Bosnia and Herzegovina) Mahir Džuho	6
(Lithuania) Marius Arlikevičius	0
(Slovakia) Adi Gyurík	1
(Italy) Michele Martina	6

Round of 16
(Armenia) Davit Makyan	1
(Albania) Alvin Karaqi	2
(Bosnia and Herzegovina) Mahir Džuho	0
(Italy) Michele Martina	2

Quarterfinals
(Albania) Alvin Karaqi	0
(Italy) Michele Martina	2

=== Bottom half ===
==== Section 3 ====
Round of 64
(Poland) Michał Bąbos	0
(Georgia (country)) Luka Vasadze	7
(North Macedonia) Petar Spasenovski	4
(Estonia) Mihkel Mets	0

Round of 32
(Georgia (country)) Luka Vasadze	2
(Sweden) Jimmy Haag	1
(England) Joe Kellaway	0
(Croatia) Enes Garibović	2
(North Macedonia) Petar Spasenovski	0
(Austria) Luca Rettenbacher	2
(France) Raybak Abdesselem	2
(Ukraine) Valerii Chobotar	2

Round of 16
(Georgia (country)) Luka Vasadze	0
(Croatia) Enes Garibović	1
(Austria) Luca Rettenbacher	3
(France) Raybak Abdesselem	1

Quarterfinals
(Croatia) Enes Garibović	5
(Austria) Luca Rettenbacher	1

==== Section 4 ====
Round of 64
(Portugal) José Miranda	1
(Denmark) Mads Viberg Larsen	6

Round of 32
(Denmark) Mads Viberg Larsen	2
(Hungary) Dániel György	4
(Montenegro) Nikola Malović	0
(Belgium) Walid Deghali	0
(Cyprus) Kostas Konstantinou	0
(Republic of Ireland) Christopher McCarthy Crean	5
(Spain) José Ibáñez	0
(Netherlands) Brian Timmermans	6

Round of 16
(Hungary) Dániel György	0
(Montenegro) Nikola Malović	0
(Republic of Ireland) Christopher McCarthy Crean	0
(Netherlands) Brian Timmermans	2

Quarterfinals
(Montenegro) Nikola Malović	0
(Netherlands) Brian Timmermans	1
