= Karate at the 2009 World Games – Men's kumite 65 kg =

Karate competition

The men's 65 kg tournament in karate at the 2009 World Games was held on July 25 at the National Sun Yat-Sen University Gymnasium.

== Medalists ==
| 1st place, gold medalist(s) | Ádám Kovács (HUN) |
| 2nd place, silver medalist(s) | William Rolle (FRA) |
| 3rd place, bronze medalist(s) | Omer Kemaloglu (TUR) |

== Round robin ==
=== Group A ===
| Rank | Athlete | W | D | L |
|---|---|---|---|---|
| 1 | Omer Kemaloglu (TUR) | 2 | 0 | 0 |
| 2 | Ádám Kovács (HUN) | 1 | 0 | 1 |
| 3 | Sergiy Mykhaylenko (AUS) | 0 | 0 | 2 |

| | TUR | HUN | AUS |
|---|---|---|---|
| Kemaloglu (TUR) | | 2–0 | 2–0 |
| Kovács (HUN) | 0–2 | | 2–0 |
| Mykhaylenko (AUS) | 0–2 | 0–2 | |

=== Group B ===
| Rank | Athlete | W | D | L |
|---|---|---|---|---|
| 1 | Thomas Kaserer (AUT) | 2 | 0 | 1 |
| 2 | William Rolle (FRA) | 1 | 1 | 1 |
| 3 | Huang Hsiangchen (TPE) | 2 | 0 | 1 |
| 4 | Yoke Wai Lim (MAS) | 0 | 1 | 2 |

| | AUT | FRA | TPE | MAS |
|---|---|---|---|---|
| Kaserer (AUT) | | 2–0 | 0–2 | 2–0 |
| Rolle (FRA) | 0–2 | | 2–0 | 1–1 |
| Huang (TPE) | 2–0 | 0–2 | | 2–0 |
| Lim (MAS) | 0–2 | 1–1 | 0–2 | |

== Knock-out stage ==
Semifinals
A2 | Kovács (HUN) | 2
B1 | Kaserer (AUT) | 0
B2 | Rolle (FRA) | 1
A1 | Kemaloglu (TUR) | 0

Gold medal fight
A2 | Kovács (HUN) | 3
B2 | Rolle (FRA) | 1
Bronze medal fight
B1 | Kaserer (AUT) | 0
A1 | Kemaloglu (TUR) | 3
