= Brian Timmermans =

Dutch karateka (born 1997)

Personal information
- Born: 15 September 1997 (age 28)

Sport
- Country: Netherlands
- Sport: Karate
- Weight class: 84 kg
- Event: Kumite
Medal record
Men's karate
Representing Netherlands
European Games
Silver medal – second place	2023 Kraków-Małopolska	Kumite 84 kg
European Championships
Silver medal – second place	2024 Zadar	Kumite 84 kg
Bronze medal – third place	2023 Guadalajara	Kumite 84 kg

Brian Timmermans (born 15 September 1997) is a Dutch karateka. He won the silver medal in the men's kumite 84 kg event at the 2023 European Games held in Poland. He won one of the bronze medals in the men's 84 kg event at the 2023 European Karate Championships held in Guadalajara, Spain.

In 2021, Timmermans competed in the men's 84 kg event at the World Karate Championships held in Dubai, United Arab Emirates. He also represented the Netherlands at the 2022 World Games held in Birmingham, United States. He competed in the men's 84 kg event. He also competed in the men's 84 kg event at the 2025 World Games held in Chengdu, China.

== Achievements ==
Year	Competition	Venue	Rank	Event
2023	European Championships	Guadalajara, Spain	3rd	Kumite 84 kg
2023	European Games	Kraków and Małopolska, Poland	2nd	Kumite 84 kg
2024	European Championships	Zadar, Croatia	2nd	Kumite 84 kg
