= Paul Newby (karateka) =

English karateka (born 1977)

- Born: September 13, 1977 (age 49); Silsden, Keighley, West Yorkshire, England
- Nationality: British
- Division: Welterweight (boxing) −60 kg (karate)
- Style: 6th Dan Black Belt in Karate
- Rank: 1st Dan Black Belt in Brazilian Jiu Jitsu

Professional boxing record
- Total: 4
- Wins: 4

Paul Newby (born 13 September 1977) is an English karate practitioner and coach, a two-time bronze European medalist, and the 2004 −60 kg WKF men's kumite world champion. Newby briefly took up a career as a professional boxer, following his karate world championship win. As of November 2019, he is a kumite coach for the Great Britain national karate team.
