= Ádám Kovács (karateka) =

Hungarian karateka (born 1981)

Adam S. Kovacs
Personal information
- National team: Hungary
- Born: 3 February 1981 (age 45) Budapest, Hungary
- Website: www.skovacs.hu

Sport
- Country: Hungary
- Sport: Karate
- Weight class: 67 kg
- Event: Kumite
Medal record
Men's karate
Representing Hungary
World Games
Gold medal – first place	2009 Kaohsiung	Kumite -65kg
World Championships
Silver medal – second place	2008 Tokyo	Kumite -65kg
Silver medal – second place	2004 Mexico	Kumite -65kg
Bronze medal – third place	2010 Belgrade	Kumite -67kg

Adam S. Kovacs (born 3 February 1981 in Budapest, Hungary) is a Hungarian karateka.

He won the gold medal in the men's kumite 65 kg event at the 2009 World Games held in Kaohsiung, Taiwan. Adam S. Kovacs serves as the League President of Karate Combat since 2020.

Kovács won gold medal at the 2005 Maccabiah Games.

== Results ==
Year	Tournament	Location	Place	Division
1998	Junior European Championships- Athens, Greece	3rd	-60 kg	
2001	Junior World Karate Championships- Athens, Greece	1st	-65 kg	
2002	World Karate Championships- Madrid, Spain	5th	-65 kg	
2004	World Karate Championships- Monterrey, Mexico	2nd	-65 kg	
2006	European Championships- Stavanger, Norway	3rd	-65 kg	
2008	World Championships	Tokyo, Japan	2nd	65 kg
2009	European Championships	Zagreb, Croatia	5th	67 kg
2009	World Games	(Chinese Taipei) Kaohsiung, Taiwan	1st	65 kg
2010	European Championships	Athens, Greece	3rd	67 kg
2010	World Championships	Belgrade, Serbia	3rd	67 kg
