= Borislav Ivanov (karateka) =

Bulgarian karate

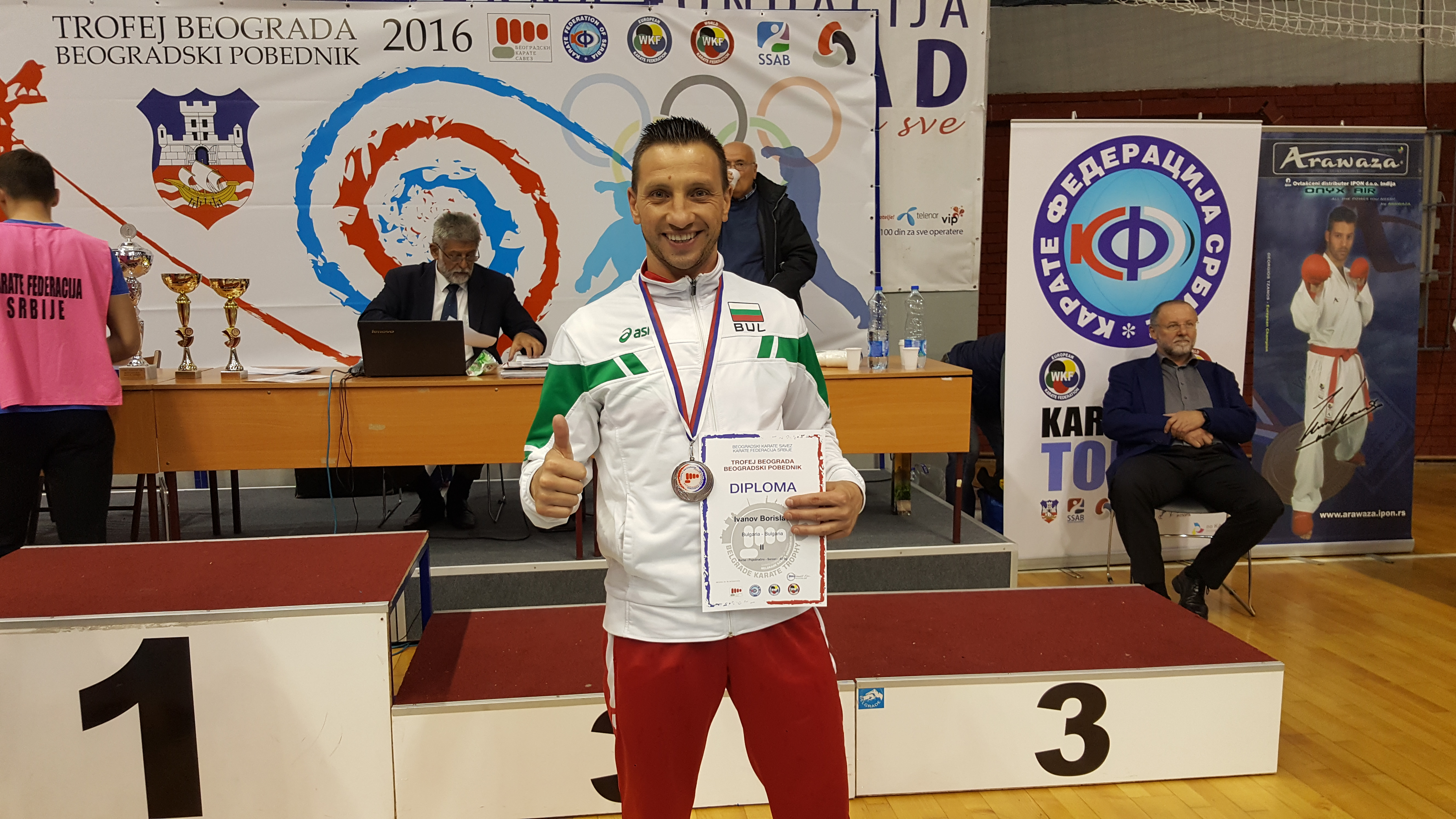
Borislav Ivanov

Borislav Penchov Ivanov (Bulgarian: Борислав Пенчов Иванов) is Bulgaria's most succestul athlete in Olympic karate and currently a karate coach.

== Biography ==
Borislav Ivanov was born on 18 January 1977 in Kyustendil, Bulgaria. He started his training career at the age of fourteen in his local karate klub "Pautalyia". In 1992 he entered his first ever competition and won first place at Bulgaria's national championship. In 1999 Ivanov graduated from the National Sports Academy with a degree in coaching.

== Career ==
Ivanov is the most successful Bulgarian competitor in Olympic karate. During his career he has won four bronze medals from European championship and one bronze medal from the World championship for youths. He is the only Bulgarian to win any kind of medal in men's karate. His last ever competition is his appearance in the 2016 Karate world championship in Linz, Austria. Borislav Ivanov has also coached the Bulgarian national from 2000 to 2008. He founded his own Karate Club "Daris" with training facilities in Kystendil and Sofia, where he is chairman and head trainer.

== Achievements ==
- 3rd Place – World Championship – youths – kumite – 60 kg in Sofia, Bulgaria – 1999
- 3rd Place European Championship – men – kumite – 60 kg in Halhidiki, Greece – 1999
- 3rd Place European Championship – men – kumite – 60 kg in Tallinn, Estonia – 2002
- 3rd Place European Championship – men – kumite – 60 kg in Moscow, Russia – 2004
- 3rd Place European Championship – men – kumite – 60 kg in Bratislava, Slovakia – 2007
- 8 time Balkan Karate Champion
- Multiple Bulgarian champion
