= Franck Chantalou =

French karateka

Personal information
- Born: 22 June 1980 (age 44)

Sport
- Country: France
- Sport: Karate

Franck Chantalou (born 22 June 1980 in Saint Denis, France) is a French karateka who won a gold medal in the men's kumite +80 kg weight class at the 2004 European Karate Championships.
