= Vanesca Nortan =

Dutch karateka

Personal information
- Born: 17 November 1981 (age 43); Zaandam, Netherlands

Sport
- Country: Netherlands
- Sport: Karate

Vanesca Nortan (born 17 November 1981 in Zaandam, Netherlands) is a Dutch karateka who won gold medals in the female kumite open class at the 2005 European Karate Championships and in the +68 kg weight class at the 2010 European Karate Championships. Nortan also won a silver medal in the female kumite +60 kg weight class and won a bronze medal in the female kumite open class at the 2004 World Karate Championships.
