= John Fonseca =

American karateka

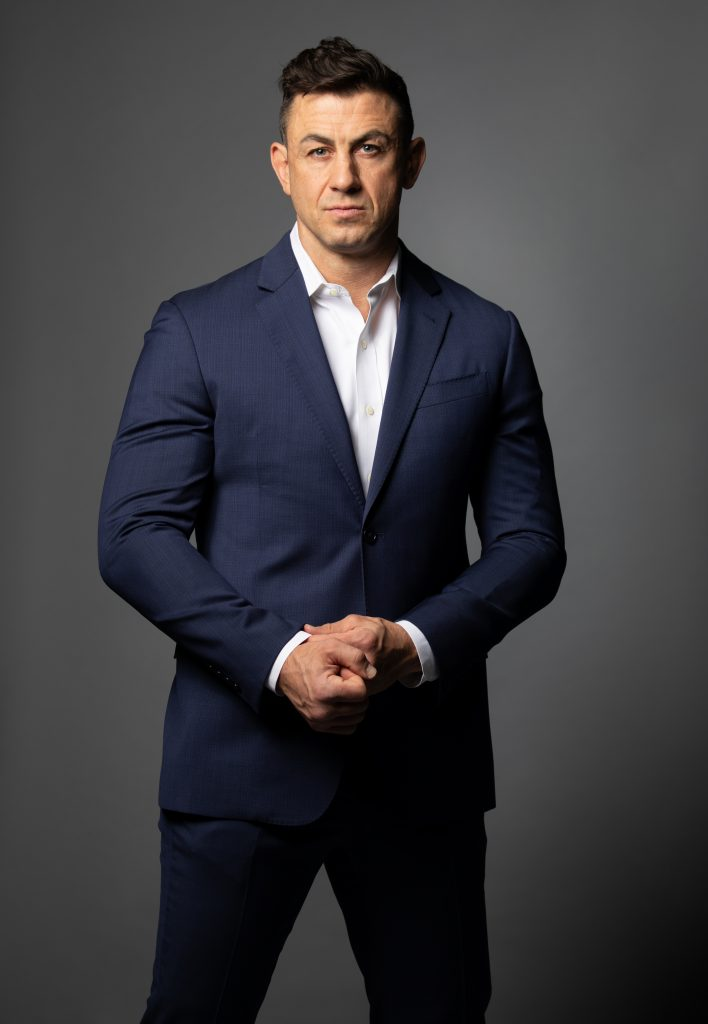
- Born: December 28, 1975 (age 50); Chicago, United States
- Style: Shotokan Karate

Other information
- Website: johnfonseca.com

John Fonseca is a former American karateka most known for being the first karate athlete in the world to win repeat gold medals at the Pan American Games, first American to medal at the Karate World Championships in almost 16 years (kumite), and first American to win the Paris Open in more than 30 years.

== Karate & Other Martial Arts ==
Fonseca currently holds a sixth degree black belt in Shotokan karate and black belts in Brazilian Jiu-Jitsu and Taekwondo. Fonseca started Karate at age six in Long Island, New York at Falco’s Karate School, and began competing nationally at seven. He relocated to Chicago with his family at age 10 and continued training and competition with the Illinois Shotokan Karate Clubs. At age 15 Fonseca represented Team USA as a junior, competing in International competitions under WUKO (World Union of Karate Organization) which later became WKF (World Karate Federation). At age 18 he joined the senior US Team and competed in his first World Championship in Malaysia. In 1996, Fonseca won a bronze medal in the open weight kumite category at the WKF World Championships in Sun City, South Africa, a feat he repeated in 2004 in the -80 kg kumite division at the WKF World Championships in Monterrey, Mexico. Fonseca was USA Team captain from 2000-2008 and continued his karate training under the coaching of Jack Pressman, James Blann, Tokey Hill, Jo Mirza, and Seiji Nishimura. Fonseca also studied Taekwondo under William Lee and Dae Sung Lee at K.H. Kim’s Taekwondo from 1998-2003 and Brazilian jiu-jitsu under Adem and Eddie Redzovic at Team Redzovic in Chicago from 2003–present day.

=== Karate Achievements ===
- 1999 & 2003 Pan American Games Gold Medalist
- 1997, 1999, 2000, 2001 Pan American Karate Champion
- 1996 & 2004 WKF World Championship Bronze Medalist
- 3x WKF World Champion Bronze Medal Contender
- 12 Time USA-NKF National Champion
- 5x AAU National Champion
- 3x USAKF National Champion
- US Open Champion
- Paris Open Champion
