= Tolyatti City Duma =

City duma of Tolyatti, Russia

Tolyatti City Duma Тольяттинская городская дума
- 8th legislature
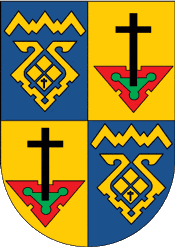

Type
- Type: Unicameral

Leadership
- Chairman: Ryzanov Sergey, United Russia since September 2023

Structure
- Seats: 35
- Political groups: United Russia (33) CPRF (1) LDPR (1)

Elections
- Voting system: Majoritarian
- Last election: September 2023
- Next election: 2028

Website
- dumatlt.ru

The Tolyatti City Duma (Russian: Тольяттинская городская дума, romanized: Tolyattinskaya gorodskaya duma) is the city duma of Tolyatti, Russia. A total of 35 deputies are elected for five-year terms.

== Elections ==
=== 2023 ===
Beginning in 2023, The city duma switched from using party lists to using single-member districts. The results of the 2023 Russian elections are as follows:

Party	Seats
United Russia	33
Communist Party of the Russian Federation	1
Liberal Democratic Party of Russia	1
Registered voters/turnout	29.23%

=== 2018 ===
The results from the 2018 Russian elections were as follows:

Party	%	Seats
Communist Party of the Russian Federation	35.85	17
United Russia	28.37	14
Liberal Democratic Party of Russia	15.16	2
A Just Russia	13.43	2
Registered voters/turnout	30.32	
