= Yadira Lira =

Mexican karateka

- Born: Yadira Lira Navarro; October 7, 1973 (age 52); Arcelia, Guerrero, Mexico
- Occupations: Karateka, coach
- Awards: Karate World Champion (2004, 2010); National Sports Award (2011); National Recognition of Women in Sport (2011)

Yadira Lira Navarro (born October 7, 1973) is a Mexican athlete and coach, whose specialty is karate. She won the Karate World Championships twice (in 2004 and 2010), and was runner-up in 2006. In 2010, she won the silver medal at the Central American and Caribbean Games in Mayagüez, Puerto Rico. In 2011, she won a silver medal at the Pan American Games in Guadalajara, which earned her a National Sports Award. She retired from competition in 2012 to become a coach of the Mexican youth karate team.

== Career ==
Yadira Lira started in karate at age 16, under the guidance of coach Koichi Choda from Benemérita Universidad Autónoma de Puebla (BUAP). After becoming a university champion, she qualified for the World Championship of Shitō-ryū Karate-Do in 1993, where she obtained a bronze medal. In 1996, Lira won the university world sub-championship, in addition to becoming a two-time Shitō-ryū Karate-Do World Champion. Lira also participated in the World Shitō-ryū Karate-Do event in Japan in 2000, winning two bronze medals; in the 2003 edition in Moscow, she won gold, silver, and bronze medals.

In the 2004 World Karate Championships, held in Monterrey, Mexico, Lira was champion in the under-60 kg kumite category. In the 2006 edition, in Tampere, Finland, Lira was runner-up in the open kumite category. In 2008, she won a gold medal in the women's open category at the 22nd Pan-American Karate Championship in Caracas, Venezuela, and a bronze in the under-60 kg category.

At the 2010 World Karate Championships in Belgrade, Serbia, the Mexican won the gold in the under-68 kg kumite category. That same year, Lira participated as part of the Mexican delegation in the Central American and Caribbean Games in Mayagüez, where she won a silver medal.

In 2011 she won another silver medal, this time at the Pan American Games in Guadalajara, in the 61–68 kg category.

Her career gained her the National Sports Award in 2011, a prize she had aspired to in 2004 after winning the World Championship, but which she could not compete for due to a scheduling conflict. In 2012, Lira announced her retirement as a professional athlete.

== Personal life ==
Despite being from the state of Guerrero, Lira has lived a good part of her life in Puebla, representing the entity in different capacities. Likewise, she has worked professionally as part of the academic staff of the Benemérita Universidad Autónoma de Puebla (BUAP). She has been referred to as a "Pueblan by adoption" and has been recognized by the Congress of Puebla, BUAP, and the local government.

In 2011 she received the National Recognition of Women in Sport from the National Women's Institute.
