= Elisa Au =

American martial artist

- Born: May 29, 1981 (age 45); Honolulu, Hawaii, U.S.
- Height: 5 ft 6 in (168 cm)
- Weight: 135 lb (61 kg; 9 st 9 lb)
- Style: Shitō-ryū Karate
- Teacher: Chuzo Kotaka
- Rank: 3 degree black belt in Shitō-ryū

Other information
- Website: ElisaAu.com

Elisa Au (born May 29, 1981, in Honolulu, Hawaii) is an American martial arts instructor and karate practitioner.

== Biography ==
Elisa Au was born on May 29, 1981, in Honolulu, Hawaii, to Gary and Jane Au. With the encouragement of her parents she began taking karate lessons at age five under the tutelage of shitō-ryū karate master Chuzo Kotaka. In 1990, Au competed in her first major tournament the AAU/United States National Karate Championships in New Orleans, Louisiana. She won gold, silver, and bronze medals at the event.

In 1991, Au received her black belt under Kotaka and his International Karate Federation. As a teenager in her native Hawaii, she began teaching after school karate programs. Several of her students went on to become national champions, including one who would win two junior world championships.

By the age of 18, Au had won three WKO World Championships and two WKC World Championships. In addition to her demanding karate schedule, she participated in figure skating, gymnastics, canoe paddling, and track and field, while attending Punahou School — an elite college preparatory academy in Hawaii. She also excelled academically and maintained honor roll status throughout high school. In 2003, Au graduated from the University of Hawaii with a degree in civil engineering.

Au continues to compete and make national and international appearances. In addition to competition, she teaches seminars around the world, including Japan, Canada, Australia and the U.S. She also stars in a six-set DVD series entitled SECRETS of Championship Karate that shares her training methods and ideas along with tips on how to succeed in karate competition.

In 2022, Elisa Au was elected Board Chair and President of USA National Karate-do Federation, the national governing body for the sport of Karate in the United States.

== DVD ==
- Elisa Au: Secrets of Championship Karate - Kihon (2006)
- Elisa Au: Secrets of Championship Karate - Kata for Beginners (2006)
- Elisa Au: Secrets of Championship Karate - Kata for Int/Adv (2006)
- Elisa Au: Secrets of Championship Karate - Kumite Beginners (2006)
- Elisa Au: Secrets of Championship Karate - Kumite Black Belt (2006)
- Elisa Au: Secrets of Championship Karate - Conditioning and Speed Drills (2006)

== Championships ==
- 3 x WKF World Champion
- 2010 WKF Bronze Medalist, first team kumite medal for USA
- 2010 World Combat Games Silver Medalist
- 2008 WKF Silver Medalist
- 2004 WKF Champion, 2 individual Gold medals
- 2002 WKF Champion
- 2002 World Cup Champion
- 4-Time Pan Am Champion
- Two-Time WKC World Champion
- Two-Time WKO World Champion
- 18-Time United States of America National Karate Federation (USANKF) Champion
- 9-Time Amateur Athletic Union (AAU) Champion
