= Tessy Scholtes =

Luxembourgish karateka and politician

Medal record

Women's karate

Representing Luxembourg

World Games
| Silver medal – second place | 2001 Akita | Kumite open |

World Championships
| Silver medal – second place | 2002 Madrid | Kumite open |

European Championships
| Bronze medal – third place | 2003 Bremen | 60 kg |

Tessy Scholtes (born 1 June 1981 in Luxembourg City) is a Luxembourgish karateka and politician.

In 2002, she finished as runner-up in the world championships in the kumite 60 kg+ category. For the achievement, she won the title of Luxembourgish Sportswoman of the Year. On 7 December 2009 she announced her retirement for personal reasons.

She is a member of the Christian Social People's Party (CSV). In the 2009 election to the Chamber of Deputies, Scholtes ran in the Centre constituency. She finished thirteenth on the CSV list. On 3 May 2011 she was sworn into parliament in order to replace Mill Majerus, who had recently died in a car accident.
