= Heidy Rodríguez (karateka) =

Dominican karateka

Medal record

Women's Karate

Representing the Dominican Republic

Pan American Games
Gold medal – first place	2003 Santo Domingo	Kumite
Gold medal – first place	2007 Rio de Janeiro	Kumite

Heidy Rodríguez (born 9 May 1981 in La Vega), is a Karateka from the Dominican Republic who twice won the golden medal at the Pan American Games. She is 3rd Dan (rank).

She majored in Medicine from Universidad Autónoma de Santo Domingo in 2008.
