= Nadine Joachim =

German karateka

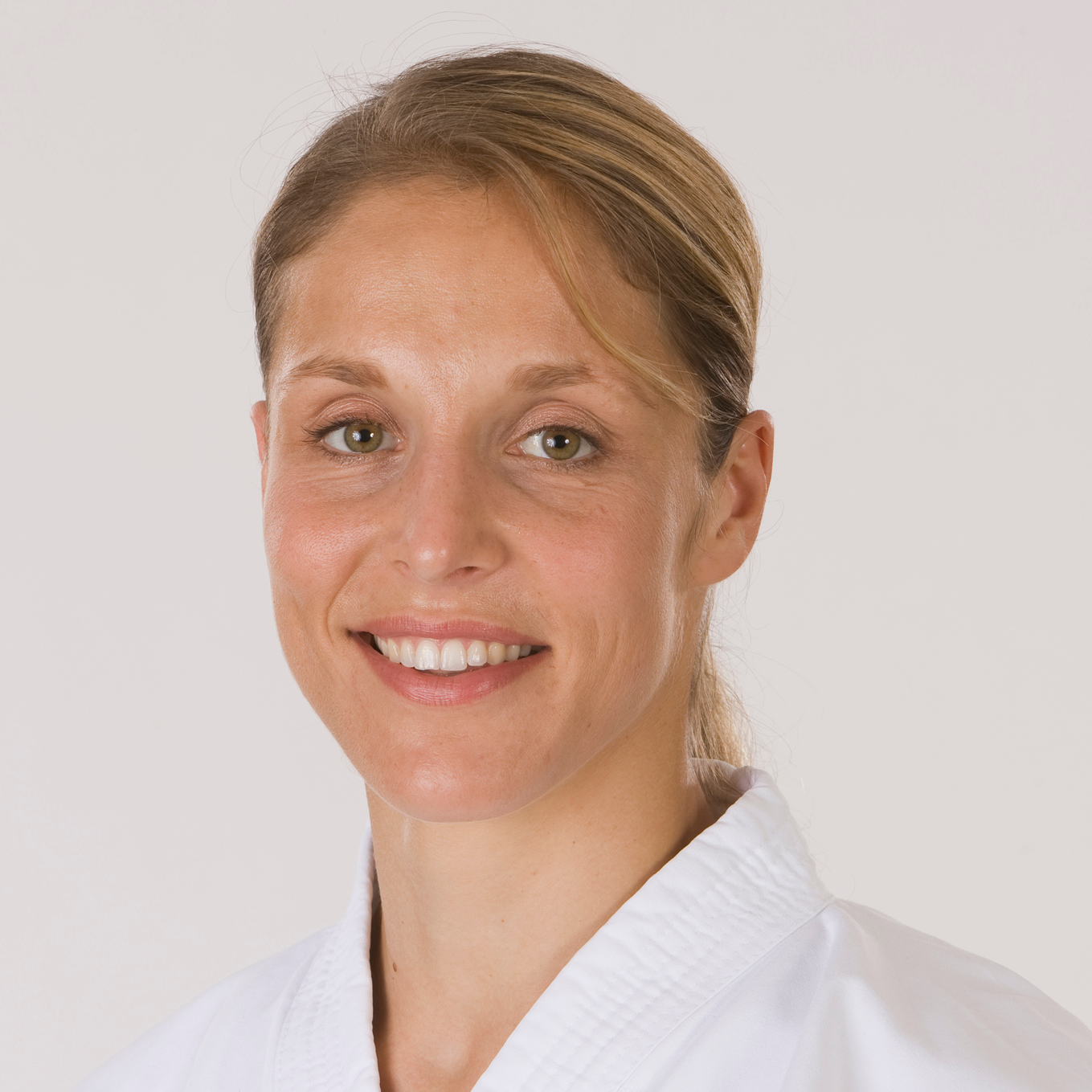
- Born: Nadine Ziemer; 2 April 1975 (age 51); Mindelheim, West Germany
- Style: Shotokan Karate
- Rank: 4th Dan

Nadine Joachim, b. Ziemer (born 18 September 1975 in Mindelheim) is a German Karateka (4th Dan) and former Deutscher Karate Verband coach. She was a karate European champion and World Champion graduated with distinction from her training as a diploma trainer at the German Sport University Cologne. On 7 December 2006 she received from German Interior Minister Wolfgang Schäuble the Silberne Lorbeerblatt.

== Career ==
Nadine Joachim has been practicing karate since 1992. From 1995 to 2007 she was a member of the German National Squad. She is a member and trainer of the Kampfkunst Kollegium, where together with Toni Dietl she developed a child-oriented concept for teaching karate to children with the help of music. At the same time, she gives coaching courses nationwide. She developed a new children's karate concept in 2005 (Samurai Kids). So far, more than 10,000 children in Germany are training according to this system (as of May 2013).
