= Tania Weekes =

British karateka

- Style: Karate

Tania Weekes is a British karateka. She is the winner of multiple European Karate Championships and World Karate Championships Karate medals.

== Achievements ==
- 1998 World Karate Championships Kumite Bronze Medal
- 2001 European Karate Championships Kumite Bronze Medal
- 2001 World Games Bronze Medal
- 2002 European Karate Championships Kumite Silver Medal
- 2005 World Games Bronze Medal
- 2005 European Karate Championships Kumite Bronze Medal
