= Akio Tamashiro =

Peruvian karateka

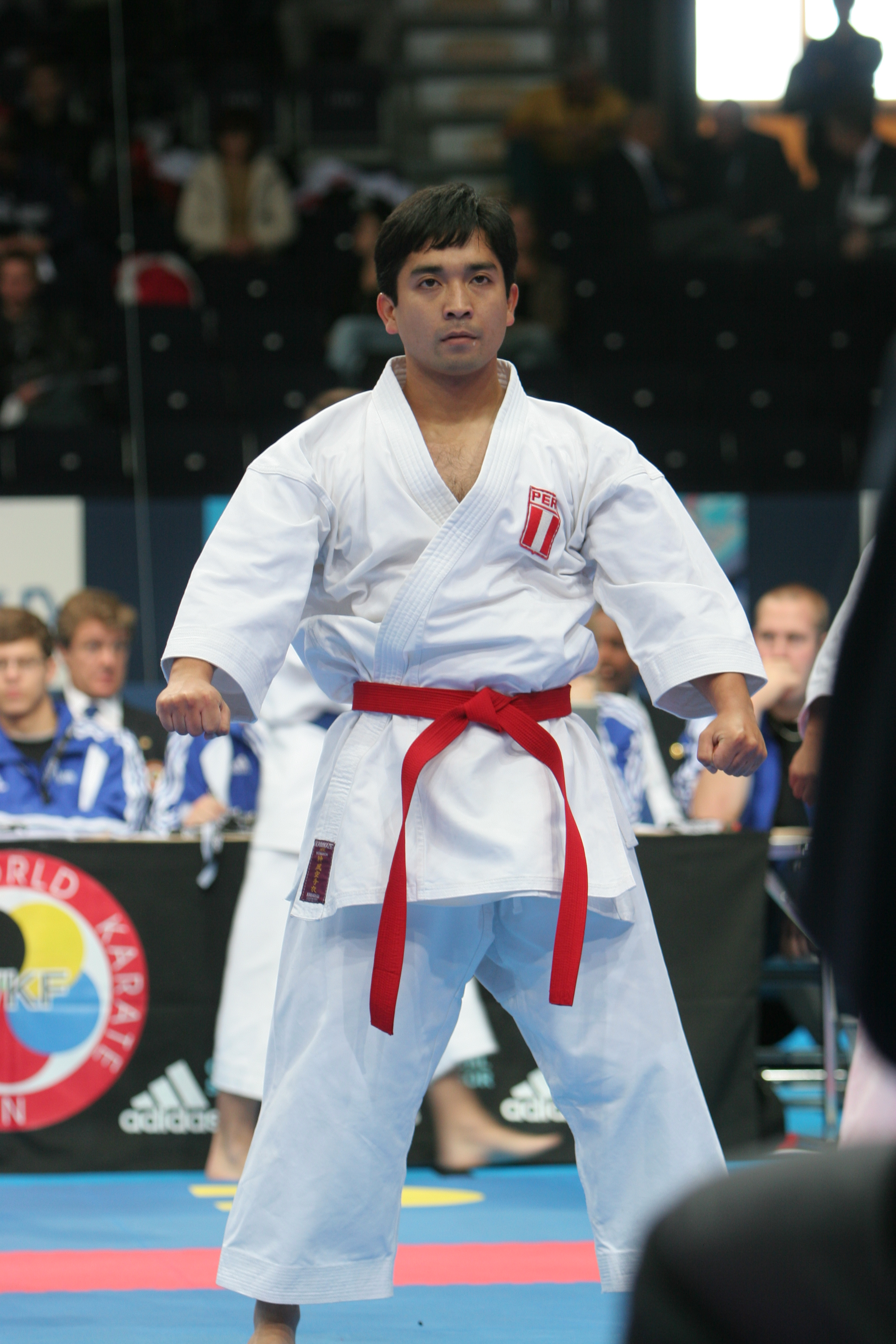
- Tamashiro in 2006

Medal record

Men's karate

Representing Peru

World Karate Championships
Silver medal – second place	2004 Monterrey	Kata
Bronze medal – third place	2006 Tampere	Kata
Bronze medal – third place	2008 Tokyo	Team Kata
Bronze medal – third place	2010 Belgrade	Kata
Bronze medal – third place	2010 Belgrade	Team Kata

World Games
Bronze medal – third place	2005 Duisburg	Kata

Pan American Games
Bronze medal – third place	1999 Winnipeg	Kata
Bronze medal – third place	2003 Santo Domingo	Kata

Alfredo Akio Tamashiro Noborikawa is a Peruvian karateka who has won several medals including a bronze in Individual kata at the 2010 World Karate Championships in Belgrade.

He was one of the bearers of the Panam Sports flag at the opening ceremony of the 2019 Pan American Games in Lima.
