= Alexander Gerunov =

Russian martial artist

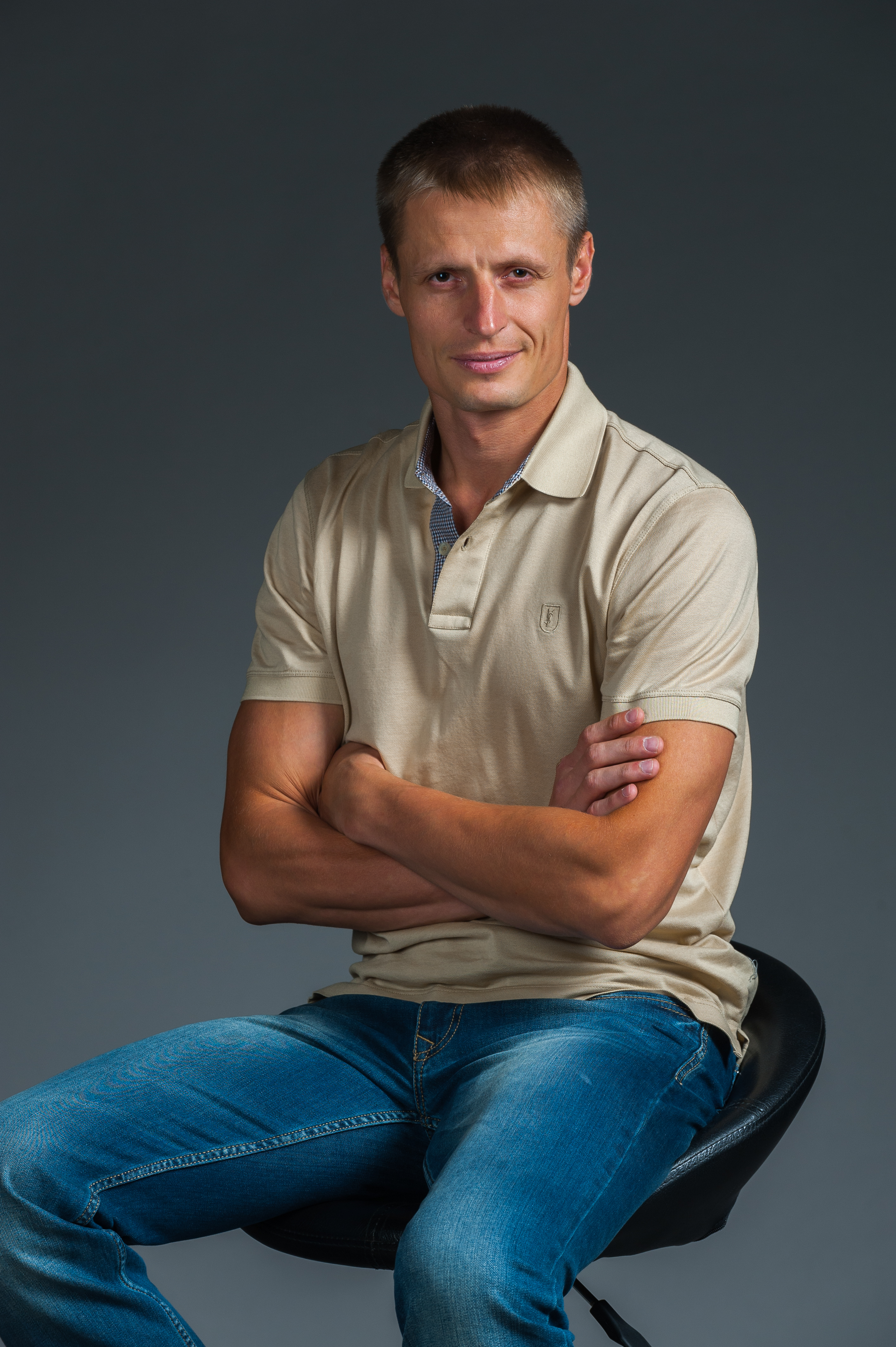

Medal record

Men's karate

Representing Russia

World Games
Gold medal – first place	2005 Duisburg	Kumite +80 kg
Gold medal – first place	2005 Duisburg	Kumite open

Alexander Evgenevich Gerunov (born December 10, 1979, in Tolyatti, Russia), is a Russian Karateka who won the World Championships (2004), European Championships (2004) and World Games (2005). He is also an instructor of the School of Combat Skills "Soyuz" (Tolyatti], Russia). Gerunov was born and trained in Tolyatti by trainer, Valerie P. Kokshin. He's trained in Shotokan, Wado-ryu Goju-ryu, Shito-ryu and Taekwondo.

== Sport achievements ==
- European Karate Federation Championships +80 kg Kumite, Champion 2004
- World Karate Federation Championships +80 kg Kumite, Champion 2004
- World Games +80 kg Kumite, Champion 2005
- World Shito ryu Karate Federation Championships +75 kg Kumite, Champion 2006
- On November 28, 2005, he was given the title of the Laureate of State Prize, "The Golden Belt of Russia".

== Political activity ==
From 2002 to 2006, Gerunov was a member of United Russia and head of the Tolyatti branch of the youth movement Youth Unity and the Young Guard of United Russia.

In the 2007 Russian legislative election, Gerunov was included in the Civilian Power party list as a deputy candidate for Tolyatti, but the party did not enter parliament.

In 2008, Gerunov headed the election headquarters of Sergei Savvateyev, a candidate for the post of Mayor of Tolyatti, president of the Forpost group of security companies, and Gerunov's sponsor.

In 2013-2015, Gerunov was head of the Civic Platform party project "Sports accessible to all" and ran for deputy of the 6th Tolyatti City Duma in the intramunicipal district No. 5 as part of the party's list.

== See also ==
- List of karate competitors
- List of karateka
- Russian Version
