= Luis Plumacher =

Venezuelan karateka (born 1983)

- Born: Luis Manuel Plumacher; 17 March 1983 (age 43); Maracaibo, Venezuela
- Nickname: Luisma; El Pluma
- Style: Kumite
- Rank: Black Belt, 3rd dan

Luis Manuel Plumacher (born 17 March 1983 in Maracaibo) is WKF world champion from Venezuela. Aside from winning a world championship in 2004, Luis Plumacher was also a silver medalist in 2006, and in the World Games in 2005. Plumacher was part of the Venezuelan National karate team for 10 years, from 2000 to 2010. During these years he was quite a prolific international medalist. Plumacher kept a very high performance during his competitive years, which made him achieve a reputation as the best fighter on his division, and leading him to 2 World finals, earning him a spot as one of the best world fighters in karate-do competitions.

Luisma's story is one of consistency. He started at a young age winning junior Pan American championships and made it to the podium at world's twice. He now devotes his time to train developing athletes and travels the world teaching seminars.

== Karate ==
Luis started training karate at the age of 4. He is a third dan (sandan) in Shotokan karate, and apart from his sports achievement Luis is said to be a skilled technician—a result of a lifetime of training. The quality of his basic techniques and kata (patterns) execution are signs of a traditional Shotokan upbringing, which skilled instructor.

Sports achievements

- 10 times Venezuelan national champion.
- 3 times Central American and Caribbean champion.
- 2 times South American champion.
- 8 times Pan American champion (4 junior, 4 senior)
- Gold medal Dutch Open 2008.
- Gold Medal Italian Open 2008.
- Gold Medal German Open 2006.
- Central American and Caribbean Games champion, Cartagena 2006.
- South American Games champion, Buenos Aires 2006.
- Pan American Games champion, Rio de Janeiro 2007.
- WKF World Championships Gold medalist, Mexico 2004.
- World Games silver medalist, Germany 2005.
- WKF World Championships silver medalist, Finland 2006

== Canada ==
Luis moved to Calgary, Alberta, Canada in mid 2015 with the idea of spending some time in the city training while his was working on coming back to competition. He had been in Calgary for a few days in 2014, invited by Sensei Juan Osuna from WSKF Canada and www.osunakarate.com to train with his Calgary athletes. He fell in love with the city and decided to use Calgary as one of his key stops while training and travelling internationally to seminars. He started training with Sensei Osuna to prepare for the Canadian National Championships, hoping to participate in this tournament in one of his stops in Canada, but that same year Karate Canada added a 'permanent resident' requirement for their National Championship so he was not able to compete in Canada. In Calgary, he met his current wife and now resides in that City. Luisma currently volunteers as one of the Karate Alberta coaches, as well as trains at the Osuna Karate dojo in Calgary, where he helps with the development of high performance youth athletes.
