= Kim Pyung-soo =

South Korean taekwondo practitioner

- Hangul: 김병수
- RR: Gim Byeongsu
- MR: Kim Pyŏngsu

Kim Pyung-soo (Korean: 김병수; born 1937), also known as Kim Soo, is a South Korean taekwondo practitioner.

== Early life ==
Kim was born in Seoul in 1937, and attended the Hankuk University of Foreign Studies (HUFS) where he received a B.A. in Russian language and literature. He began studying gwonbeop Kong Soo Do at an early age under the guidance of Nam Sok Lee, president of the Chang Moo Kwan Association in Seoul. In November 1994, Kim was promoted to 10th degree black belt by his Senior Grandmaster, Hong Jong-Pyo, Taekwon Kwon Bop, in the Central YMCA, Seoul, establishing Kim as one of the highest ranking karate instructors in the world.

During years of practice and teaching, Kim has taught many students, including the bodyguards of the late South Korean president, Syngman Rhee, U.S. Army units in South Korea, municipal police departments, youth organizations and students at universities in South Korea and Texas.

Kim arrived in the United States in January 1968 and has maintained a central school in Houston, Texas consistently since September of that year. In 2018, the school celebrated 50 years in business. In September 1970, he inaugurated his martial arts system entitled Chayon-ryu (Natural Way). Kim is fluent in Korean, English, Spanish and Russian; in addition, he understands and writes Chinese. Kim plans on continuing to teach and to place emphasis on the spiritual as much as the physical aspect of martial arts.

== Noted Research ==
In the 1950s, Park Chul-hee mentioned to Kim he thought their missing master, Yoon Byung-in, may be teaching in Russia. This inspired Kim to study Russian language and literature in college in hope of traveling to Russia to find Yoon Byung-in. Since that time, Kim has continued to preserve the chuan-fa curriculum from Yoon Byung-in, plus searched for Yoon. His research took Kim all over the world including Japan, then Russia (Omsk and St. Petersburg) in 1994. Kim was finally able to make contact with Yoon's family in South Korea, who were able to verify Yoon's chuan-fa training and life. Kim maintains a relationship with the family to this day.

== Works ==
Kim Pyung-soo is the author of three books:

1. Palgue 1-2-3 of Taekwondo Hyung, Ohara Publications, 1974. ISBD: 978-0897500081
2. Palgue 4-5-6, Ohara Publications, 1976. ISBN 978-0-89750-013-5
3. Palgue 7-8, Ohara Publications, 1981.
4. тхэквондо, Russia publisher needed, 2000.

He was the first correspondent from South Korea for Black Belt magazine (1964–68) and is regularly used as a historical consultant by various authors of martial arts.

== Honors and awards ==
- 1954 – Earns 1st degree Black Belt from Nam Sok Lee, in Chang Moo Kwan style of Kong Soo Do in Seoul, South Korea.
- 1958 – Teaches Special Police Detachment of first South Korean president, Syngman Rhee.
- 1961 – Teaches hand-to-hand combat training for Republic of Korea Army, Eighth Division.
- 1962 – Promoted 5th Dan at first promotion contest of the Korea Tae Soo Do Association.
- 1963 – Graduates from HUFS with a BA in Russian language and literature.
- 1964 – Chief Instructor, Eighth U.S. Army and HQ I Corps, U. S. Army (1964–1967).
- 1967 – Promoted 6th-degree Black Belt by the South Korea Tae Kwon Do Association, Amateur Athletic Association.
- 1968 – Kim founds Kim Soo College of Taekwon-Karate in Houston. Promoted 7th Dan, Kang Duk Won Martial Arts Association, South Korea. (Burtman, 2001)
- 1970 – Birth of the Chayon-Ryu teaching method. August 15, Kim receives citation from South Korean government for his contribution to elevating the Korean national image in the world.
- 1973 – Kim receives 7th-degree Black from South Korea Tae Kwon Do Association, and 7th-degree Black Belt from World Tae Kwon Do Federation. Kim publishes Palgue 1, 2, 3. Kim receives 6th-degree Black Belt from Korea Hapkido Association.
- 1974 – Publication of Palgue 4, 5, 6.
- 1976 – Publication of Palgue 7 & 8: "Black Belt Requirements".
- 1979 – Kim receives 8th-degree Black Belt from Kang Duk Kwon; Kwon Bop Association; Korea Tae Kwon Do Association; World Tae Kwon Do Federation.
- 1984 – Kim receives first summa cum laude Professor citation at Rice University (this has been repeated many times through the years).
- 1985 – Kim receives 9th-degree Black Belt from Master Park Chull Hee, Kang Duk Won; Kwon Bop Association.
- 1986 – Named by South Korean president Chun Doo-hwan, to serve on the Committee for the Reunification of Korea, an international "think tank" of leaders (term concluded in 1993).
- 1988 – 9th-degree Black Belt from Hong Jong Pyo, Taekwon Kwon Bop, Central YMCA, Seoul, South Korea. January 16 proclaimed "Grandmaster Kim Soo Day" by Houston Mayor Kathryn J. Whitmire, honoring Kim's 20 years in the city. (Burtman, 2001)
- 1993 – On July 16 Kim is honored by Texas Governor Ann Richards for his 25 years of dedication and service. Kim receives Presidential commendation by U.S. President Bill Clinton.
- 1994 – In November, Kim is promoted to 10th degree Black Belt by his Senior Grandmaster, Hong Jong Pyo, Taekwon Kwon Bop, Central YMCA, Seoul, South Korea.
- 1997 – CBS "Inside Edition" featured Chayon-Ryu Martial Arts with a demonstration by Kim and Master Kim Geary. On May 24, Kim was inducted into the Texas Martial Arts Hall of Fame as "Grandmaster of the Year." Chayon-Ryu was chosen as "Best School" in Texas for 1997 as well. A permanent display will be included in the Texas Sports Hall of Fame in Waco. In June, Kim is inducted into the World Karate Union Hall of Fame in Pennsylvania, as "Karate Grandmaster of the Year" in America and receives the "Lifetime Achievement Award of Honor" for training and teaching more than 30 years in the Martial Arts. In September, Kim is inducted into the International Martial Arts Hall of Fame in Orlando, Florida, as "Texas Grandmaster of the Year 1997."
- 2007 – April 6 - Kim was inducted into the Tae Kwon Do Hall of Fame as "Pioneer Journalist & Historian" to honor his role as a correspondent for Black Belt magazine.
- 2010 – Kim received a Hall of Fame award from the U.S. Taekwondo Grandmasters Society for Literary Achievement.
- 2010 – Kim received a proclamation from the Texas Senate in recognition of his 42nd anniversary in Texas.
- 2011 – Kim was selected as a guest speaker at the United States Taekwondo Grandmaster Society banquet in Los Angeles.
- 2011 – Kim was invited to instruct a seminar at the Sport For All Busan Association, held at the Olympic Memorial Community Hall in Busan, South Korea.
- 2011 – Kim was invited to perform a Chayon-Ryu demonstration at the International Youth Judo Championships at Dong-A University in Busan, South Korea.
- 2011 – Black Belt Magazine (September 2011 issue) features Kim's article, "Taekwondo For Health: Train Smart Now and Your Body Will Thank You Later."
- 2012 – Kim was invited to participate and demonstrate Chayon-Ryu at the XXII Asiana Sport For All Association (ASFAA) Congress 2012 held in Delhi, India.
- 2012 – Kim was invited by the Taekwondo Promotion Foundation, Inc. to film the Kwon-Beop legacy from Grandmaster Yoon Byung-in at Yong-In University. This filming included Kwon-Beop Hyung and pre-arranged sparring techniques.
- 2012 – Kim received a Certificate of Donation (No. 12-006) for the supply of old historical articles written by him for Black Belt magazine
- 2013 – On January 16 Kim received a proclamation from Houston Mayor, Annise Parker and the Houston City Council on his Sapphire(45th) Anniversary of the founding of Kim Soo Karate, Inc.
- 2013 – On May 24 Texas State Resolution 989, sponsored by Senator John Whitmire, was presented to Kim in the Texas Senate Chamber of the Texas Capitol in Austin, Texas. This resolution honored Kim on his 45th anniversary of founding the Chayon-Ryu martial art system and his outstanding contributions to the community.
- 2016 - Kim receives Proclamation from Houston mayor, Sylvester Turner.
- 2018 - Kim receives a proclamation from the Texas Senate (#478) for the 50th anniversary of Kim's Chayon-Ryu Martial Arts System in Houston, Texas.
- 2018 - Kim was named Black Belt Magazine's Instructor of the Year.
