= Taegeuk Il Jang =

First taekwondo form

Taegeuk Il Jang (Korean: 태극1장) is the first of eight taekwondo forms practiced in Kukki Taekwondo, as defined by the Kukkiwon. A form, or poomsae (also romanized as pumsae or poomse), is a choreographed pattern of defense-and-attack motions. Taegeuk Il Jang is considered a beginner form, often (but not universally) practiced by students of Kukki style taekwondo with rank of 8th geup. Eighth geup students of Kukki-style taekwondo practice this form in order to advance to the next rank (7th geup).

== Etymology ==
The taegeuk symbol

The word taegeuk (Korean: 태극; Hanja: 太極, Korean pronunciation: [tʰɛgɯk̚]) refers to the universe from which all things and values are derived. It is also the symbol that makes up the center of the flag of South Korea and the source for its name, taegeukgi (hangul: 태극기, where gi means "flag"). The taegeuk is commonly associated with Korean Taoism philosophical values as well as Korean shamanism.

The word il is the number 1 in the Sino-Korean numbering system. The word jang translates roughly as "chapter" or "part". Taegeuk Il Jang translates as "Part 1 of the Taegeuk".

== Symbolism ==
The floor pattern (or yeon-mu) of each taegeuk poomsae is three parallel lines. On each line, a 180 degree turn is performed.

- If the turn is performed by pivoting in-place, the line is considered to be a broken line.
- If the turn is performed by moving the lead foot to the rear, the line is considered to be a solid line.

The floor pattern of each taegeuk poomsae then represents three broken or solid lines, called trigrams or gwae (bagua in Chinese). Each trigram (gwae) corresponds to a natural element.

The Pal Gwae or 八卦 Bāguà—The eight trigrams
乾 Qián ☰	兌 Duì ☱	離 Lí ☲	震 Zhèn ☳	巽 Xùn ☴	坎 Kǎn ☵	艮 Gèn ☶	坤 Kūn ☷
Heaven/Sky	Lake/Marsh	Fire	Thunder	Wind	Water	Mountain	Earth
天 Tiān	澤(泽) Zé	火 Huǒ	雷 Léi	風(风) Fēng	水 Shuǐ	山 Shān	地 Dì
Gun	Tae	Yi	Jin	Seon	Gam	Gan	Gon

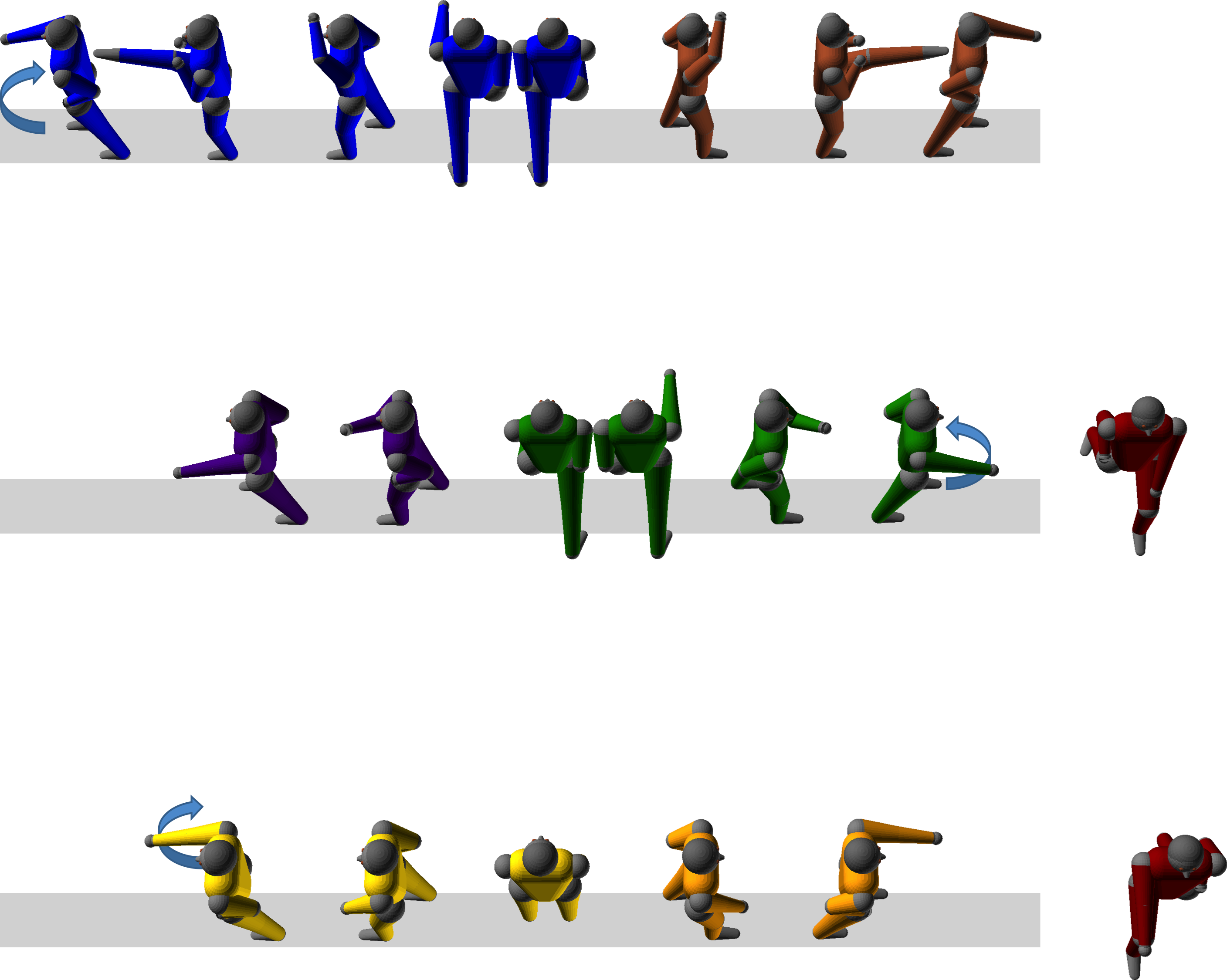
Each of the three turns in Taegeuk Il Jang is performed by moving the lead foot, indicating that the associated trigram is made up of three solid lines.

When performing Taegeuk Il Jang, the turn on each line is performed by moving the lead foot to the rear. For this reason, the trigram associated with Taegeuk Il Jang is three solid lines ("gun") denoting "the sky" or "the heavens". In Daoist philosophy the sky is associated with creation, or beginnings. Taegeuk Il Jang, then, is seen as the "creation" of a new taekwondo student, or the student's new beginning.

Elements of the trigram can also be seen in the poomsae's performance. For example, in Taegeuk Il Jang, the movements are primarily upright, with the body open (no blocks or strikes that cover the torso), so the performance is "high and open", like the sky.

== Techniques ==
As a beginner form, the techniques used in this poomsae are relatively simple:

- Walking stance
- Long front stance
- Low block
- Inside middle block
- High block
- Middle punch
- Front snap kick

== Development ==
During the 1920s and 1930s many of the pioneers of taekwondo studied karate or Chinese martial arts in which forms practice is seen as an essential element of the martial art. When these pioneers returned to Korea after the Japanese occupation, they incorporated forms practice into their teaching. During the 1960s there were several efforts among these pioneers to unify their styles of martial art and create a consolidated set of forms. In 1965 the Korea Taekwondo Association appointed a committee of representatives from six of the Nine Kwans to develop the forms for what is now called Kukkiwon- or WTF-style taekwondo. The committee consisted of:

- Young Sup Lee of the Song Moo Kwan
- Kyo Yoon Lee of the Han Moo Kwan
- Hae Man Park of the Chung Do Kwan
- Jong Myun Hyun of the Oh Do Kwan
- Soon Bae Kim of the Chang Moo Kwan

In 1967, this committee introduced the Palgwae and Yudanja (Black Belt) forms (including a simpler version of Koryo). In 1971 two additional kwans joined the committee:

- Chong Woo Lee of Jidokwan
- Young Ki Bae also of Jidokwan
- Young Tae Han of Moo Duk Kwan

This expanded committee went on to develop the Taegeuk forms.

== See also ==
- Taegeuk (taekwondo)
- Taekwondo forms
- Karate kata
- List of Taekwondo Techniques
