= Kong Soo Do =

Korean martial arts derived from Karate

- Hangul: 공수도
- Hanja: 空手道
- RR: Gongsudo
- MR: Kongsudo

Kong Soo Do (공수도) is a name used to refer to Korean martial arts derived from Karate, that was used by a couple of the original kwans before the unification and creation of Taekwondo as the universal striking art of Korea. As with Tang Soo Do, the name Kong Soo Do is composed of the Korean pronunciation of the Chinese characters for "karate-do", meaning "empty-hand way" in English.

Kong Soo Do is a not a formalized system of martial arts, and the styles used by the various kwans are influenced by the individual backgrounds of the respective founders/head instructors. The name Kong Soo Do was used by Yun Mu Kwan (sometimes Yun Moo Kwan Kong Soo Do Bu, Hanja: 朝鮮硏武館 拳法部) and the YMCA Kwon Bop Bu (later named Chang Moo Kwan) to refer to their martial art.

== Background ==
=== Yun Mu Kwan ===
Yun Mu Kwan was founded by Chun Sang Sup (전상섭) learned Okinawan Karate from Gichin Funakoshi. Chun had a very close relationship with Yoon Byung-In (윤병인) the founder of the YMCA Kwon Bop Bu. Chun and Yoon would travel together to train with other martial artists, sometimes traveling to Manchuria. They trained with each other so much that they became known as brothers. Chun went missing during the Korean War; subsequently, this kwan voted to change its name to the Jidokwan. After Chun disappeared in the Korean War, his original students voted for Master Yoon, who trained in Chuan Fa in Manchuria, as the Jidokwan's first President.

=== Kwon Bop Bu/Chang Moo Kwan ===
The Kwon Bop Bu/Chang Moo Kwan was founded in 1947 by Yoon Byung-In who had studied Chinese Chuan Fa under the guidance of a Mongolian instructor in Manchuria. Later, Yoon trained Karate at the Nihon University karate club in Japan with Kanken Tōyama. At one point, Japanese karate students pursued and started to beat up another Korean karate student who had skipped karate class to spend time with his sweetheart. After being persuaded by the other Korean student for help, Yoon used his Chuan Fa to skillfully deflect and evade the karate students’ strikes and kicks to the point that they gave up and ran back to tell their teacher what had happened. Teacher Tōyama invited Yoon to tell him about the skillful non-karate martial art he had used against his students. Yoon explained to Toyama about his Chuan Fa education in Manchuria. Toyama appreciated the Chuan Fa background since he (Toyama) had previously studied Chuan-fa in Taiwan for seven years. They decided to exchange knowledge; Yoon would teach Toyama Chuan Fa, and Toyama would teach Yoon his Shotokan Karate. Yoon later created his own art and called it Kwon Bop Kong Soo Do. Kwon Bop is the Korean pronunciation of the Chinese word Chuan Fa.

Early Chang Moo Kwan was mainly based on Chinese Martial Arts (Chuan Fa). The early Chang Moo Kwan taught Palgi kwon (which was influenced by Bajiquan).

Yoon went missing during the Korean War, but his teachings were carried on by his top student Lee Nam Suk, who changed the name of the school to Chang Moo Kwan. Even though Yoon had disappeared during the Korean War, information about him was later recovered by original Chang Moo Kwan student, Kim Pyung-soo in 2005, when he found Yoon Byun-in's family. In addition to Lee Nam Suk's work with Chang Moo Kwan, other of Yoon's top students also carried on his teachings, namely; Park Chul-hee, and Hong Jong-Pyo (both Kang Duk Won).

During the Korean unification of the KTA in the 1960s, a small sub-Kwan broke away to form the Kong Soo Do Kang Yu Do style, founded by Grandmaster Jae Soo Kwon. Its location was Yongsan District Korea, outside of the U.S. military base; it then made its way to the United States. Outside of Korea, very few martial artists know or practice this style today. The name stands for 'the hard and soft way' or 'path of Korean empty hand.'

== See also ==
- Original masters of taekwondo
- Kwan (martial arts)
- Yun Mu Kwan
- Chang Moo Kwan
- Tang Soo Do
- Korean martial arts

== Notes ==
1. Tang Soo Do is derived from "Tang Hand", which was one of the names of early Karate. Kong Soo Do adoptes the later "Empty Hand" convention.
