= Taegeuk (taekwondo) =

Set of Pumsae or forms used to teach taekwondo

- Hangul: 태극
- Hanja: 太極
- Revised Romanization: Taegeuk
- McCune–Reischauer: T'aegŭk

In taekwondo, taegeuk is a set of Pumsae (also known as Poomsae or Poomse), or defined pattern of defense-and-attack forms used to teach taekwondo.

Between 1967 and 1971, Kukkiwon-style taekwondo made use of an older set of forms called the palgwae forms developed by the Korea Taekwondo Association (KTA) with input from some of the original nine kwans of taekwondo. By 1970, additional kwans had joined the KTA so the newer set of taegeuk forms was developed to better represent inputs from all the participating kwans. By 1971, the palgwae forms were considered to be deprecated in favor of the newer taegeuk forms, though some schools still teach palgwae forms as well. All World Taekwondo Federation (WTF) Pumsae competitions use the taegeuk pumsae, along with 8 of the black belt Pumsae.

To gain a black belt, a student generally must know all eight Taegeuk Poomsae and also be able to perform all of them consecutively with no breaks in between.

Each Taegeuk form symbolizes a specific state thought to be indicative of the belt the student currently holds, and is represented in WTF Taekwondo by trigrams (originally derived from the I-Ching) similar to those found in the four corners of the South Korean flag.

== Taegeuk Poomsae ==
Many schools require that form practice begin with a bow to the flag and/or instructor, but the motions of the forms themselves do not require the bow, nor is it necessary in personal practice.

Belt level (such as yellow)	Name	Symbol	Techniques introduced
8th Gup	태극 1장 (Taegeuk Il Jang)	☰, "天", "건", "Heaven, Light"	Walking stance; Front stance (also called long stance); Low block; Inside block (also called middle block); High block; Middle punch; Front kick (also called front snap kick)
7th Gup	태극 2장 (Taegeuk Ee Jang)	☱, "澤", "태", "Lake"	High punch
6th Gup	태극 3장 (Taegeuk Sam Jang)	☲, "火", "이", "Fire"	Back stance; Knifehand outside block; Knifehand neck strike
5th Gup	태극 4장 (Taegeuk Sa Jang)	☳, "雷", "진", "Thunder"	Double knifehand block; High knifehand block; Palm block; Back fist strike; Spearhand strike; Side kick
4th Gup	태극 5장 (Taegeuk Oh Jang)	☴, "風", "손", "Wind"	Cross stance; L-Shape Stance or right and left stance; Outside block; Hammer fist; Elbow strike
3rd Gup	태극 6장 (Taegeuk Yook Jang)	☵, "水", "감", "Water"	Outer forearm block; Double wedge block (also called opening block); Roundhouse kick
2nd Gup	태극 7장 (Taegeuk Chil Jang)	☶, "山", "간", "Mountain"	Tiger stance; Horse stance; Double knifehand low block; Double block; Knee strike; Double upset punch (i.e., uppercut); Crescent kick
1st Gup	태극 8장 (Taegeuk Pal Jang)	☷, "地", "곤", "Earth"	Single mountain block; Jumping front snap kick

== See also ==
- Taekwondo
- Hyung (poomsae)
