= Yoon Byung-in =

Korean martial artist (1920–1983)

- Born: May 18, 1920; Fengtian, China
- Died: April 3, 1983 (Aged 63); North Korea
- Style: Chuan Fa, Shudokan Karate
- Rank: 5th dan Shudokan Karate

- Yoon Byung-in
- Hangul: 윤병인
- Hanja: 尹炳仁
- RR: Yun Byeongin
- MR: Yun Pyŏngin

Yoon Byung-in (May 18, 1920 – April 3, 1983), also known in English reference as Byung-in Yoon, was a Korean Grandmaster of martial arts. He is believed to be the first Korean national to study Chuan Fa (Chinese Gung Fu) in China and to return to teach it in Korea. He was an influential instructor to many current and past Masters and Grandmasters, and himself a master of many styles and studies of Martial Arts.

== Life ==
=== Childhood ===
Yoon Byung-in was born on May 18, 1920, in Fengtian, Manchuria. He was second of three sons of Yun Myong-keun, a distillery owner. His grandfather, Yun Young-hyun, was a Korean of noble birth. Following the Japanese annexation of Korea, his father's business started to suffer and he took his family and fled to Manchuria. Yun attended elementary and secondary school (at that time, an eight-year program) in Manchukuo and graduated in 1938. During his elementary years, after diligent efforts to impress a Mongolian Chuan-fa master, the child Byung-In was permitted to study Chuan Fa or Gung Fu. Yoon studied Chinese Chuan Fa under the guidance of a Mongolian instructor in Manchuria for unspecified time.

=== Japan ===
Yoon went to Tokyo, Japan in late 1938 to study agriculture at Nihon University. During this time, he started learning Shudokan karate under Kanken Toyama. He was not initially engaged in karate training at the university, but was often seen practicing conditioning exercises against a courtyard tree. This tree reportedly started leaning from his practice.

At one point, Japanese karate students pursued and started to beat up another Korean karate student who had skipped karate class to spend time with his sweetheart. After being persuaded by the other Korean student for help, Yoon used his Chuan Fa to skillfully deflect and evade the karate students’ strikes and kicks to the point that they gave up and ran back to tell their teacher what had happened. Teacher Tōyama invited Yoon to tell him about the skillful non-karate martial art he used against his students. Yoon explained to Toyama about his Chuan-fa education in Manchuria. Toyama appreciated the Chuan-fa background since he (Toyama) had studied Chuan-fa in Taiwan for 7 years, previously. They decided to exchange knowledge; Yoon would teach Toyama Chuan Fa and Toyama would teach Yoon his Shudokan Karate. Yoon soon became the captain of Nihon University's karate team and eventually was awarded a master's certificate and the rank of 4th dan by Toyama. In 1940s – while in Japan – Yoon taught quan-fa and karate at Tokyo YMCA.

=== Return to Korea ===
Yoon returned to Korea in 1945, after the Japanese rule over Korea ended upon the Surrender of Japan in World War II. Upon settling, he formulated his martial art style and called it Kwon Bop Kong Soo Do (roughly translated as "fist art empty hand way", i.e "Quan fa-Karate").

On September 1, 1946, he first began teaching martial arts at the Kungsung Agricultural High School. Around this time, he also taught martial arts at Yun Moo Kwan.

Either late 1946 or early 1947, he established his own school at YMCA in Seoul. This school would become known as "Seoul Kwonbup Bu" and/or "YMCA Kwon Bop Bu", which would serve as the foundation for future Chang Moo Kwan. Early in his Seoul Kwan, Yoon taught some Kung Fu forms, however specifics of the curriculum remain unspecified. Yoon's teaching of Karate techniques/kata is much well known and its curriculum has been vouched by Lee Num-suk. He also varied students’ training according to body size.

=== North Korea ===
Yoon would disappear amidst of Korean War to the North Korean side. According to Kim Pyung-soo, Yoon vanished in August 1950. Yoon Byung-du, a captain in the North Korean Army and Yoon Byung-in's brother is identified as cause of Yoon Byung-in going to North Korea. Yoon Byung-du made him to come with him to DPRK's side, likely by force, as Yoon Byung-in would have had to leave his wife and eight month daughter behind. When Yoon Byung-in arrived to DPRK's side, he would be imprisoned at Gojae-do Island as prisoner of war.

Between 1951 and 1966, the whereabouts and activities of Yoon Byung-in are unknown.

In 1966 and 1967, he taught Gyeoksul to North Korean special forces of the Moranbong. In late 1967, Master Yoon completed his assignment and was assigned to a position at a concrete factory in Chongjin, where he was until his death from lung cancer in April 1983.

== Martial Arts knowledge ==
The Mongolian quan fa master who taught Yoon chinese martial arts remains unknown. His name has never been specified by Yoon nor any of his associates. It is speculated that the style this Mongolian martial artist taught to Yoon was either Changquan and/or Yang-style tai chi. It is known that early Chuan-fa forms from the YMCA Kwon Bop Bu included Dan Kwon (Duan Quan), Chang Kwon (Changquan), Tai Jo Kwon (Taizuquan), Pal Gi Kwon (Bajiquan), and Doju San (토조산, Escaping Mist) and others.

Yoon learnt Shudokan Karate under Kanken Toyama. Yoon has been awarded 4th Dan Black by Toyama. One of the styles of quan fa that Toyama had studied in Taiwan was tai chi, and he is known to have taught this to several of his advanced students, including Yoon.

Despite heading a notable kwan in post-World War II Korea and being associated with various figures that would be involved in creation of Taekwondo, Yoon Byung-in himself was never directly involved in creation of the afore-mentioned martial art. Yoon was taken to North Korea in August 1950, during the early phases of the Korean War and was not involved in the unification process of the kwans that would begin c. 1955 and finalized in 1959 with establishment of Korea Taekwondo Association.

It has been reported that in mid-1960s, Yoon Byung-in served as a martial arts instructor for Korean People's Army and has contributed to the development of Gyeoksul.

== Notes ==
1.Allegedly, the majority of kung fu practitioners and instructors in areas of Manchuria circa 1930s were of Mongolian ethnicity/origins.
2.By June 1950, the North Korean Army (KPA) had taken over much of South Korean region.
3.Originally called Korea Tang Soo Do Association, then Korea Taesoodo Association and in 1965 it was referred to as Korea Taekwondo Association.
