= Jung Do Kwan =

Taekwondo schools or kwan teaching

- Hangul: 정도관
- Hanja: 正道館
- RR: Jeongdogwan
- MR: Chŏngdogwan

== History ==
Jung Do Kwan was founded in 1954 by Young Woo Lee and was one of the last of the original nine Kwans to form.

Young Woo Lee was originally a student of the Chung Do Kwan (which translates to Bluewaves). He spent a lot of time training with his friend Uhm Woon Kyu and developing his own techniques. Eventually he decided that he wanted to start his own school, so Jung Do Kwan was born. Because it is heavily influenced by Chung Do Kwan, Jung Do Kwan is considered a branch of the older Kwan (called an Annex Kwan).

At first, Young Woo Lee struggled to figure out a name for his new school. But then Uhm Woon Kyu suggested modifying Chung Do to Jung Do, changing the meaning from "Bluewaves" to something closer to "stepping the right way". Young Woo Lee thought it was perfect, so he stuck with it.

In 1978, the Kwan system was closed through unification. A group of Kwan Presidents (known as Kwan Jangs), including Yong Woo Lee, came together to create a formal document unifying the Kwans.

== The School ==
The official motto of Young Woo Lee's school was "I am an honorable man without shame".

Jung Do Kwan rose in popularity, and Young Woo Lee had to teach five classes in order to keep up with the growing attendance. Eventually, he expanded and opened more schools in five different cities throughout South Korea.

== What's in a Name ==
Jung Do Kwan is more commonly referred to as such, however it can also be referred to as "Jeong Do Gwan".

The name also has a few slight variations in translation, such as "correct way of life," or "the righteous way." Young Woo Lee decided on Jung Do because he felt it aligned with the spirit of a martial artist.

== Prominent Figures of the Jung Do Kwan ==
Yong Woo Lee- Original creator of the Jung Do Kwan. He also became a director of the Korea Taekwondo Association in 1963.

Kim Jae Ki- Kim Jae Ki was one of the first students to study Jung Do Kwan. Eventually, he moved to the United States with a friend and joined the United States Taekwondo Union. In 1992, Kim Jae Ki opened his own school, which has grown into 22 schools scattered across several countries. Kim Jae Ki officially became a Grand Master in 1993.

Chun Young Keun- Chun Young Keun participated in the first Taekwondo World Cup Championship, numerous World Taekwondo Championships, and several other important taekwondo competitions. In 1979, he was appointed the position of National Father of Chilean Taekwondo by the Chilean president. He moved to the United States in 1991 and as of 2014, Chun Young Keun was the president of the Washington D.C. Region Teachers Association, the Virginia Korean Association, and a director for the Pan American Taekwondo Federation.
