= Kim Un-yong =

South Korean sport administrator

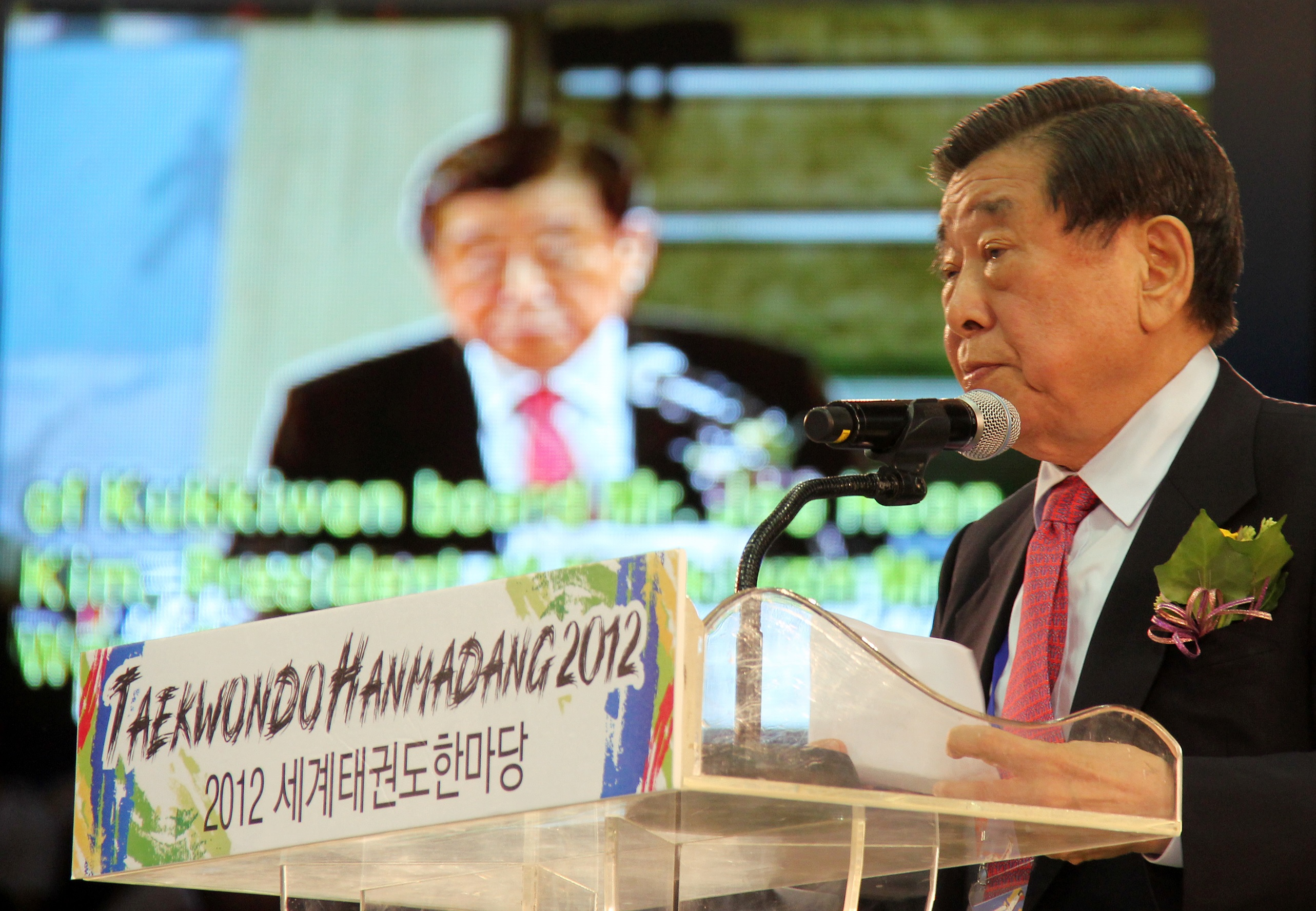
- Born: 19 March 1931; Daegu, Korea, Empire of Japan
- Died: 3 October 2017 (aged 86)
- Education: Yonsei University
- Occupation: Former president of the World Taekwondo Federation
- Successor: Choue Chung-won

Korean name
- Hangul: 김운용
- Hanja: 金雲龍
- RR: Gim Unyong
- MR: Kim Unyong
- Website: www.KimUnYong.com

Kim Un-yong or Un Yong Kim (19 March 1931 – 3 October 2017) was a South Korean sports administrator, vice-president of the International Olympic Committee, and founding member of the WTF executive board. Kim Un-yong was elected the president of the Korean Taekwondo Association on 23 January 1971. He received a doctorate in political science in 1963 from the Yonsei University. Kim retired from the WTF presidency in 2004 and was succeeded by Chungwon Choue.

Kim Un-yong was elected the president of the Korean Taekwondo Association on 23 January 1971. Though he initially declined the position due to the continued conflicts within the organization, he was asked by the Korean government to accept and to clean up the association.

Believing that Taekwondo was a Korean martial art and its governing body should therefore be based in Korea, Dr. Kim dissolved the relationship between the Korean Taekwondo Association and the International Taekwondo Federation.

In 1973, the World Taekwondo Federation was formed and Dr. Kim was elected its first president. Kim played a significant role in debuting Taekwondo at the Olympics and helping South Korea host the 1988 Summer Olympics.

In 2004, he was arrested for embezzlement and bribery charges and sentenced to two-and-a-half years in prison.

Kim has served as president of the Korean Olympic Committee, president of the 2002 Pusan Asian Games organization committee, president of the Korea Taekwondo Association, president of World Taekwondo Headquarters (Kukkiwon), an ambassador at large with the Ministry of Foreign Affairs and Trade, co-chairman of the Rebuilding Korea Committee, and internationally, he was the president of GAISF, executive board member of the IOC, chairman of the IOC Radio and Television Commission, and president of the World Taekwondo Federation.

In December 2017 he posthumously appeared on the cover of Tae Kwon Do Life Magazine in an issue dedicated to his contribution to the globalization of Taekwondo.
