= Kang Duk Won =

Taekwondo schools or kwan teaching

Kang Duk Won Taekwondo
- Founder: Hong Jong-Pyo & Chul Hee Park
- Ancestor arts: Chang Moo Kwan
- Official website: KangDukWon.org

- Kang Duk Won
- Hangul: 강덕원
- Hanja: 講德院
- RR: Gangdeogwon
- MR: Kangdŏgwŏn

Kang Duk Won was one of the original 9 kwans that eventually merged to create the Kukkiwon system. This Kwan was founded in the later 1950s by former students of the YMCA Kwon Bop Bu. These two students of YMCA Kwon Bop Bu founder Byung In-Yoon were Hong Jong-Pyo and Chul Hee Park. Today, Kang Duk Won still exists in Korea and is officially known as Taekwondo Kang Duk Won, which is a social friendship club that endorses the Kukkiwon system and supports the World Taekwondo Federation. Kang Duk Won also has a school in the United States as American Kang Duk Won Federation.

On April 2, 2016, Kang Duk Won co-founder Chul Hee Park died peacefully. Prior to his passing, on November 6, 2015 he officially stepped down as world head of Kang Duk Won and passed the mantle of leadership to Hwa Chong, who the very next day founded the World Kang Duk Won Federation, which currently includes Kang Duk Won Taekwondo-affiliated associations in Brazil, Korea, Pakistan, Portugal, Vietnam, and the United States.

On January 1, 2018, the Kang Duk Won Kwon Bup Association was formed for the purpose of representing all members in the United States on matters pertaining to the Kang Duk Won martial arts, hold board meetings, establish qualifications for rankings, qualifications for instructors, and minimum curriculum standards. The association is based in Modesto, California and is represented by high ranking black belts who have trained under the direct lineage of Grand Master Chul Hee Park, who taught Grand Master Phillip Rushing while living in the United States. (For more information, visit www.kdwa.org)
