= Ainsley Smart =

Irish-American singer-songwriter

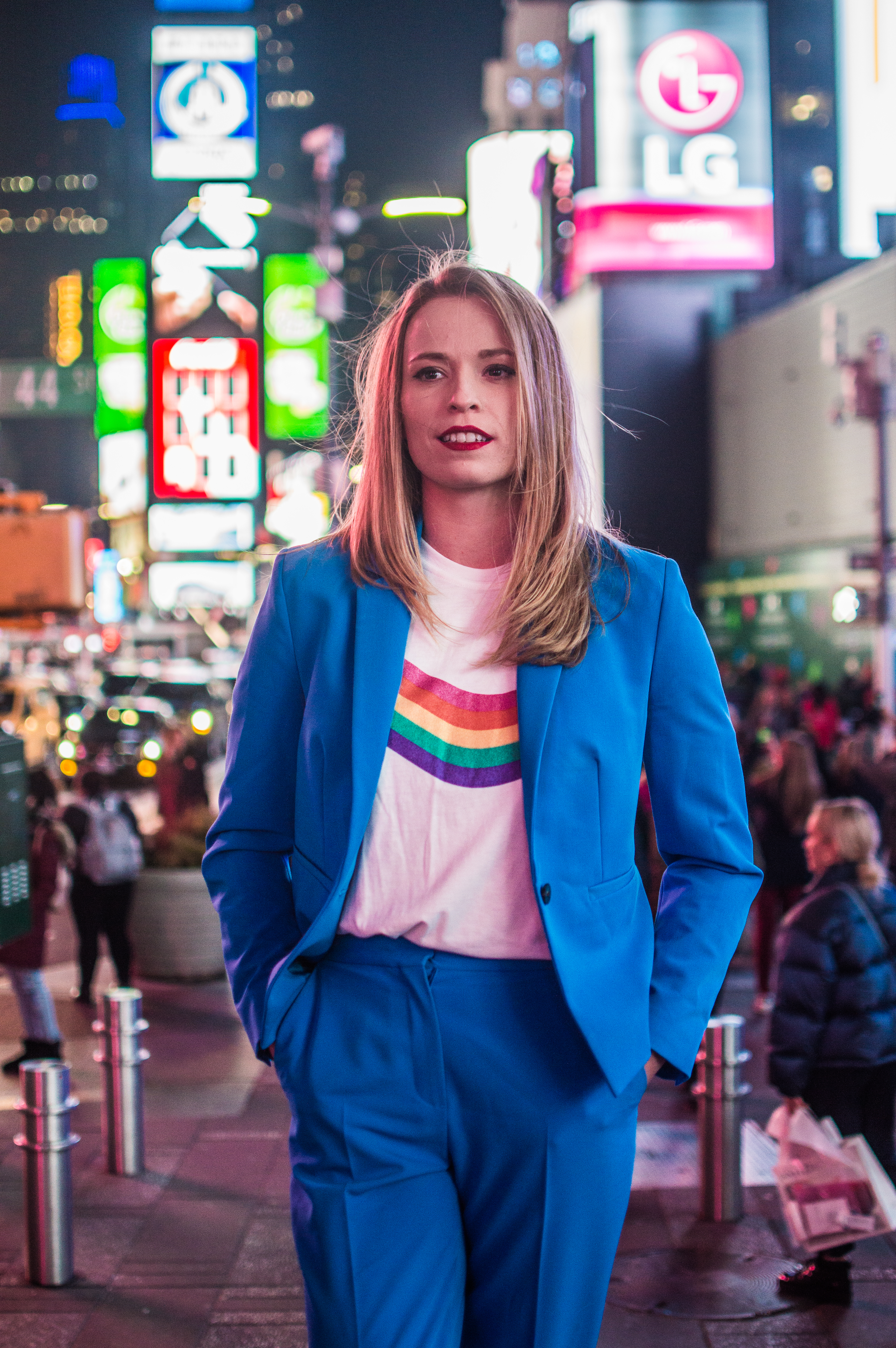

Background information
- Born: Ainsley Katharine Smart; February 25, 1999 (age 27); Abington, Pennsylvania, U.S.
- Genre: Pop
- Occupations: Singer; songwriter; actor; screenwriter
- Years active: 2012–present
- Labels: ATV Publishing, Sony Music
- Website: ainsleysmartmusic.com

Ainsley Katharine Smart (born February 25, 1999) is an Irish-American singer-songwriter, actor and screenwriter. Her breakthrough single "Way Too Easy" has garnered over 10 million views and was featured on radio stations across the globe.

== Early life ==
Ainsley Smart was born in Abington, Pennsylvania to parents Linda and Colm Smart. She is a citizen of Ireland, the United States, Great Britain and Switzerland due to her father being born in Belfast and her mother's side of the family being Swiss. Her parents are divorced, she split her time growing up between The United States, and Switzerland with stints in Belfast, Ireland. Smart was a talented athlete, and played competitive soccer and trained for 11 years from ages 5-16 in Tae Kwon Do and speaks fluent Korean. As of 2025, she holds a Kukkiwon certified fourth degree black belt ranking. Smart also participated in local theatre productions, and took acting lessons with the intention of becoming an actor.

== Music career ==
=== 2012–2019: Songwriting Ventures ===
At age 16, she was discovered by talent manager and producer Jay Levine, and flown out to Los Angeles California. Though she has the intention of becoming a singer, together with her manager they decided to pursue a songwriting path instead. She signed a seven year deal with ATV Publishing where she co-wrote pop music for other young pop artists such as Fifth Harmony, The Vamps, Austin Mahone, and Shawn Mendes under several aliases.

=== 2021–2022 : Way Too Easy, Blame Me ===
In July 2021, she began an experimental venture capital funded development project to explore alternatives to signing a standard major label record contract. She subsequently recorded several songs in Malibu, California with producer/engineer Steve Baughman and producer Mason Levy. Her debut single 'Way Too Easy' was released on August 23, 2021, and has since garnered several million views across social media platforms, and was played on radio stations across Europe, rising to number one in Switzerland. In November 2021, she became the first independent artist to cover Rollercoaster Magazine. In November 2021, she released her second single 'Blame Me'. The music video for "Blame Me" was filmed in the Langham Hotel in London with a working budget of 100,000 GBP. A European and subsequent press tour was planned, and cancelled due to her mother's diagnosis with cancer. Smart returned to America to care for her mother.

=== 2025 – present : Make it First, Make it Good Later ===
In September 2025, Smart's management team announced a special release of an album that would include all of the songs recorded under the previous production, with the addition of several new songs including the upcoming single, "Ghost of You".

== Discography ==
=== Singles ===
| "Way Too Easy" | — | — | — | — |
| "Blame Me" | — | — | — | — |

== Film career ==
In July 2025, Smart relocated to the United States and signed with Leading Edge Entertainment in Los Angeles. Under a first-look agreement with an undisclosed network, she began developing screenplays while also securing the opportunity to participate in the projects as an actor.”

== Professional soccer career ==
Smart grew up playing competitive soccer in the United States and Europe. In 2022 after taking a 10 year break from music Smart decided to return to the sport and began intensively training. In 2023, she signed a two-season deal with Frauen Team Berner Oberland in Switzerland to play on both their professional Swiss Super League and second division team as a striker. In 2024 she was signed to Eagles FC, a pre-professional W-league team in the US one a summer season contract as a midfielder, but had to withdraw in pre-season due to schedule conflicts with entertainment projects.
