= Nam Suk Lee =

Founder of Chang Moo Kwan

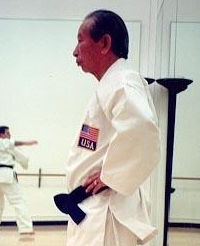
- Nam Suk Lee teaching Traditional Chang Moo Kwan at the San Pedro YMCA

Personal details
- Born: June 28, 1925 Yeo Joo, Korea
- Died: August 29, 2000 (aged 75) Torrance, California

Nam Suk Lee (June 28, 1925 – August 29, 2000) born in the city of Yeo Joo, is credited with co-founding the traditional Korean martial art of Chang Moo Kwan in the mid-1940s, and then promoting and expanding it globally. Chang Moo Kwan was one of the five original Kwans which became Tae Kwon Do in the mid 1950s. In his later life Nam Suk Lee was to make the seaside community of San Pedro, California his home, where he reestablished his traditional roots in Chang Moo Kwan. He was 75 and still actively teaching Chang Moo Kwan through the San Pedro YMCA. Nam Suk Lee died in the neighboring Southern California community of Torrance on August 29, 2000, due to a stroke.

== Early life ==
After Nam Suk Lee was born in Yeo Joo, a Korean city 40 miles of Seoul, the Lee family moved to Seoul, Korea in the 1930s during Imperialistic Japanese occupation of the Korean Peninsula. Nam Suk Lee had lost a younger brother to an illness prior to relocating to Seoul; he was just a year old. Nam Suk Lee's "favorite sport was soccer and he was known to be a dominant player. He loved to study and he assumed leadership position in classroom activities."

Nam Suk Lee was born leader and this inclination would later facilitating the gathering of several students to train in what was to become the roots of Chang Moo Kwan. In an interview with his student Jon Wiedenman, Nam Suk Lee relayed the story of the inception, "point zero," of Chang Moo Kwan. Nam Suk Lee stumbled upon a martial arts book, a Chinese translation of Gichin Funakoshi's "Karate Jutsu". If teenage Nam Suk Lee would have been discovered training by the unforgiving Japanese soldiers, death could have been the penalty. Jon Wiedenman presented a republished copy of "Karate Jutsu" to Nak Suk Lee by Kodansha Publications for his birthday.

Putting things in historical perspective, this was a few short years before World War II, and the Japanese troops were gearing up for total domination of Korea and the Far East. In spite of the clear and present danger, young Nam Suk Lee secretively pored over the many black and white photographs of Gichin Funikoshi and soon sifted and extrapolated what he could of the one-dimensional forms and techniques to make the beginnings of his martial art, what would become Chang Moo Kwan.

A born leader, Nam Suk Lee, driven to teach, rallied up several recruits to practice his new art. Clandestine, they would diligently practice in a local junior high school playground, behind a high wall, out of eye-shot of the watchful "enemy." Nam Suk Lee shared this with Jon Wiedenman in an interview shortly before his death. Nam Suk Lee offered many stories of his trials and tribulations during their time together. One of Wiedenman's favorites was of Nam Suk Lee's students practicing breaking techniques by removing roof tiles from local buildings, Japanese occupied of course, and defiantly demolishing them with various kicks and punches. They did this, of course, to develop focus and penetration targeting.

== Role in forming Chang Moo Kwan ==
In 1945, WWII ended and Korea was again free to the practice martial arts. In 1946 in Seoul, Korea, Byung In Yoon established a Taekkyeon Club at the Kyung Sung Agricultural School. Chang Moo Kwan was introduced to the YMCA and Nam Suk Lee was the first instructor. In a 2000 interview between Jon Wiedenman and Nam Suk Lee, he was asked how Byung In Yoon became the first Grandmaster of Chang Moo Kwan, and Lee answered, "He was two years older than me.

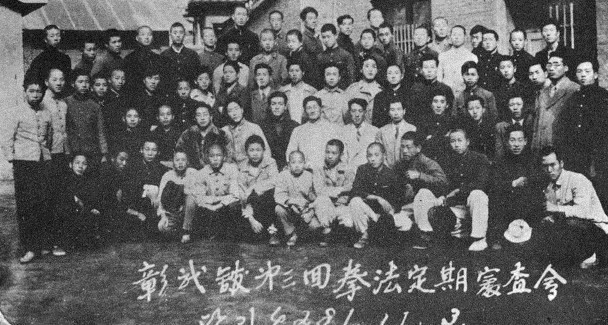
A commemorative photo taken the 3rd Regular Promotion Test held at YMCA Seoul, Korea on November 3, 1948.

It has been established the late Byung In Yoon, had significant roots in Chuan-Fa which he learned as a youth growing up in Manchuria. Wiedenman notes "while training with Nam Suk Lee, I asked him several times where Byung In Yoon's influence could be recognized in our forms. I don't think I ever got an exact answer. Byung In Yoon had trained extensively in Japan under Kanken Toyama in Shudokan. Lee had been self-taught in Funikoshi's Shotokan. I believe it was just an understanding the harder system prevailed."

The earliest known photo of Nam Suk Lee and Byung In Yoon is from November 3, 1948 (See Right Hand Photo). It is taken after the 3rd Regular Promotion Test held at the YMCA in Seoul, Korea. At that time a "Regular Promotion Test" was held twice a year with an intermediate test in-between. One fascinating thing about this photo is the students are wearing "Chinese style" button up tops. This is most probably indicative of Byung In Yoon's Manchurian Chuan-Fa influence.

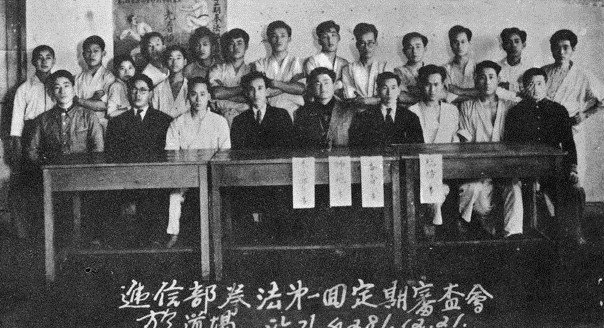
Participants of the 1st Promotion Test in the Ministry of Communications Chang Moo Kwan Department on December 21, 1948.

Another photo taken December 21, 1948 shows the participants attending the 1st Chang Moo Kwan Promotion Test at the Ministry of Communications Department. This was a likely site for Nam Suk Lee's main school as it was also his place of employment. In this photo, students are garbed in doboks similar to Japanese "gis." This picture may indicate Lee was applying his personal interpretation of the philosophies, skills, and traditions of Shotokan roots to Chang Moo Kwan.

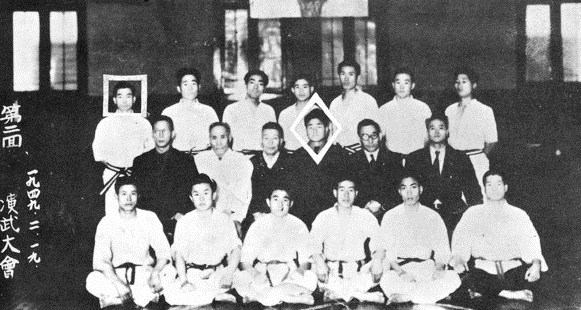
2nd Chang Moo Kwan demonstration (Nam Suk Lee in shown with square, Byung In Yoon shown with diamond).

In a photo depicting the 2nd Chang Moo Kwan Demonstration at the YMCA in Seoul, Korea, the participating students and Nam Suk Lee are wearing traditional uniforms. The Chinese style attire is nonexistent. This would seem to indicate Lee's Shotokan roots dominate, as his forms would later reflect. Understandably, having been subjected to the often harsh tyranny of the Japanese occupied forces in Korea, Lee shined away from things of Japan. Why, one might wonder, would he base his Chang Moo Kwan on an apparently Japanese, Shotokan? Upon closer examination Gichin Funikoshi was an Okinawan expatriate living in Japan teaching an Okinawan martial art. This seemed to work for Nam Suk Lee. Chang Moo Kwan was in no small part responsible for "returning normalcy to Korea after WWII."

The surge of Chang Moo Kwan growth came to a violent halt as North Korea and South Korea entered a war in 1950, one which has never officially ended. When the Korean War ended in 1953 the country was divided at the 38th parallel in 1953, and Byung In Yoon was missing. The human cost of the Korean War (June 25, 1950 to June 27, 1953) was high and many prominent Korean martial artists served and were MIA or killed, often as commandos or spies. It was up to Nam Suk Lee to carry the torch forward. He did. Once again using the principles and practices of Chang Moo Kwan to help revitalize the spirit of war-torn Korea.

== Role in expansion of Chang Moo Kwan ==
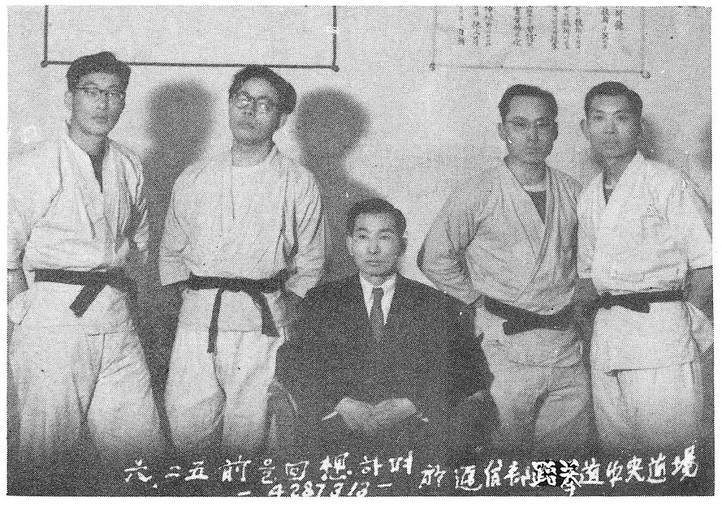
Ministry of Communications Taekwondo department. From left to right: Lee Un Yong, Kim Sun Koo, Lee Nam Suk, Kwak Sung Kyoo, and Son Chul Joon.

In 1953 immediately after the end of the Korean War, Nam Suk Lee hit the ground running with Chang Moo Kwan, implementing his art as a way to help rebuild the Korean spirit, student by student. An employee at the Ministry of Communications, it would make sense this was where he continued teaching Chang Moo Kwan. In December 1953, the 13th Regular Promotion Test was held. Hundreds of students were already embracing and reaping the mental, physical, and emotional benefits of Chang Moo Kwan. The 1950s saw an explosion of dojangs, demonstrations, and recognition.

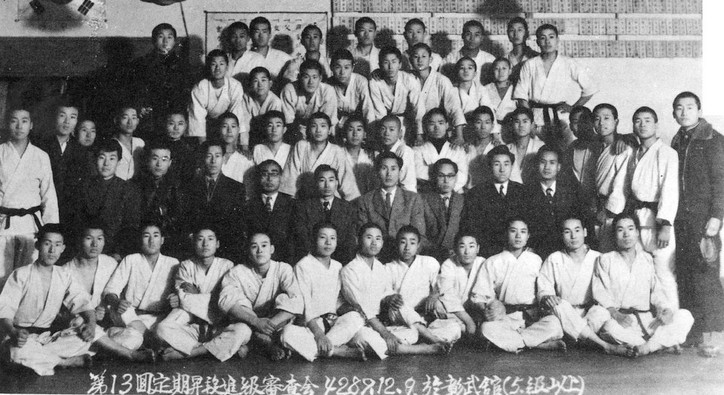
A picture showing the Participants in the 13th regular promotion test. The picture was taken in 1953.

In the mid 1955 several Korean martial arts masters got together and unified several different "kwans" or schools under the common name "The Art of the China Hand" which a few years later became Tae Kwon Do, the "art of kicking and punching." At this point Nam Suk Lee's Chang Moo Kwan was frequently referred to as Tae Kwon Do, and may very well have begun to lose some of its uniqueness. In September 1961 the Korean Tae Kwon Do Association was formed (KTA). Nam Suk Lee was appointed to the Chair of General Director to the KTA in 1961; however, in January 1962 he resigned. In 1965 the KTA was reorganized by the Korean government, and by original design, it would allow each school or "kwan" to maintain some control over their individualism, including technique, philosophies, and forms. Wiedenman maintains "I don't think Grandmaster Nam Suk Lee was entirely comfortable with watering down anything with his homespun traditional art."

Nam Suk Lee rejoined the newly reformed Korean Tae Kwon Do Association by serving as its General Director in 1967 and then Vice President in January 1969; moreover, he was reappointed to this post in 1971. May 28, 1973 marked the formation of the World Tae Kwon Do Association (WTF). Nam Suk Lee was appointed as an Executive Council Member of the WTF in 1973, concurrently he was appointed as the Vice Chairman Council of Techniques by the KTA.

During the early 1970s Nam Suk Lee traveled extensively visiting Chang Moo Kwan studios both in Korea and outside Korea. At its pinnacle, 1976, the distribution of Chang Moo Kwan was made up of about 900 studios or dojangs, and almost 400 of them were overseas. During the late 1960s and early 1970s Nam Suk Lee entertained visitors from all over the world as he traveled globally to many countries including Germany, Brazil, Venezuela, and extensively in the United States. The "Green Book", as it is nicknamed, is a yearbook of sorts titled "On the Occasion of the 30th Anniversary of founding (Sept 1 1946-Sept 1 1976)." It is a snapshot of "the way things were at Chang Moo Kwan's apex." It contains a directory of studios across the United States and world including Australia, Canada, Central America, South America, The Caribbean, Europe, and the Middle and Far East.

== Chang Moo Kwan's Revival ==
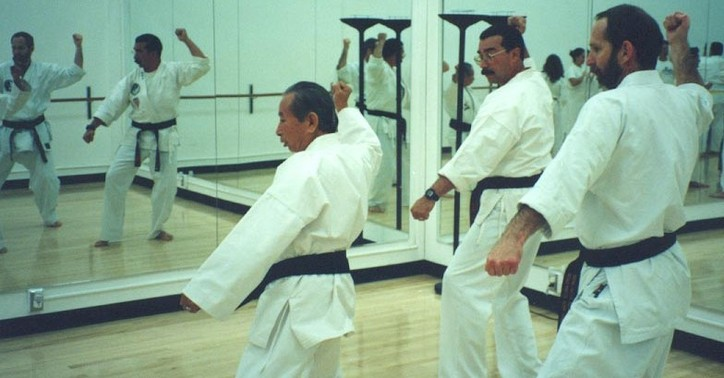
Nam Suk Lee training with students Jon Wiedenman and George Fullerton.

In the mid 1980s Nam Suk Lee joined the rest of his family, four sons and one daughter, settling in the USA in Southern California in the seaside community of San Pedro. In 1997, Nam Suk Lee met up with three traditional Chang Moo Kwan instructors Jon Wiedenman, George Fullerton, Tony Barnes. All three had trained for a quarter century each in Traditional Chang Moo Kwan. Wiedenman first asked if Lee could attend one of Wiedenman's black belt promotion tests. Lee agreed to do so. Next, Wiedenman asked Lee to visit his adult class at the San Pedro YMCA. Lee obliged. Seizing the opportunity, Lee stood up in the middle of class, walked to the front and began teaching. Wiedenman's students were overwhelmed. Immediately after class Wiedenman and Fullerton pleaded with Lee to teach them on a regular basis. Having not instructed in over 30 years, and now in his early 70s, Nam Suk Lee was reluctant at first. Lee told Wiedenman and Fullerton that he had not trained in a long time and had no uniform or belt. Wiedenman and Fullerton bought him a uniform, had the Korean and American flag sewn on it, and even presented him with and custom embroidered belt. Lee agreed to teach Wiedenman privately, every week, and an adult class every two weeks.

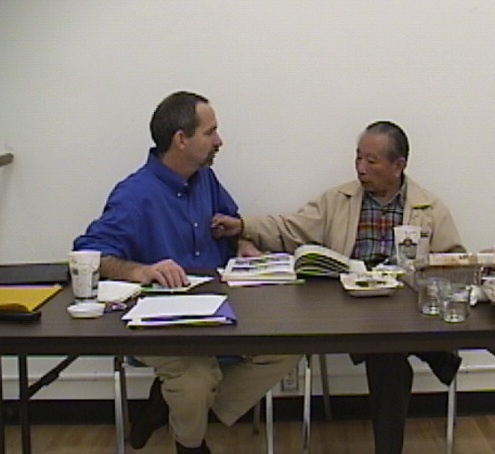
Jon Wiedenman interviews Grandmaster Nam Suk Lee in March of the year 2000.

At that point in time Wiedenman and Fullerton made an agreement with Lee that they would embrace whatever Lee had to offer. This was no small promise, as both Wiedenman and Fullerton had a total of almost 200 students and 40 black belts. All of the students were asked to adopt Lee's teaching and traditions. The students excitedly embraced this change. Wiedenman had told Lee that he and his students would "empty their cups" and unconditionally accept his teachings. Lee now had his first dojang in many, many years.

Wiedenman and Fullerton urged Lee to simply teach them the roots of Chang Moo Kwan which he wanted to prevail over time. Until his death, Nam Suk Lee worked diligently with Wiedenman and Fullerton. During this time, Nam Suk Lee was able to present many forms, fighting techniques, and one-steps which were the foundation of traditional Chang Moo Kwan. Wiedenman noted, "It was a very great relationship. He passed on what he felt was important of his beloved art of Chang Moo Kwan. We respectfully followed his lead without question." What was in it for Lee was the dignity and satisfaction of passing on his art to a group who appreciated and cherished it. Lee trained in the art he founded and love until four days before he fell ill. Chang Moo Kwan's inception was in 1946 at the Seoul, Korea YMCA came full circle, rekindling at the YMCA in Lee's hometown of San Pedro, regenerated and stronger than ever before.

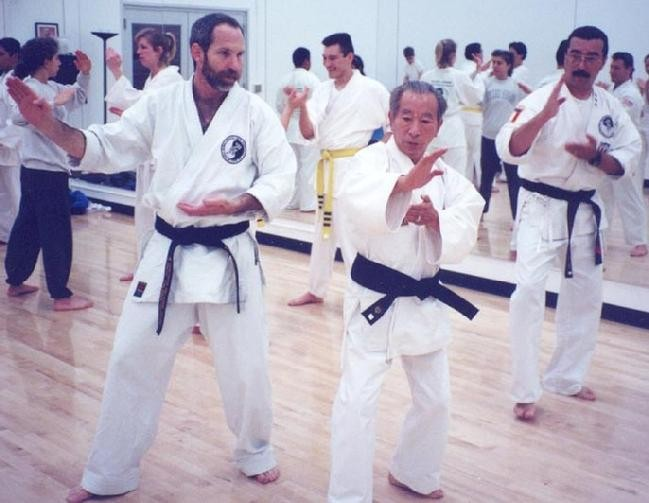
Nam Suk Lee trains with Jon Wiedenman and George V. Fullerton in the summer of 1998.

Wiedenman spent a considerable about of non-training time with Nam Suk Lee in which the redesigned the logo to his satisfaction and solidified some of the traditional Chang Moo Kwan philosophy. Wiedenman videotaped many classes and a few interviews. These may be the only tapes of Nam Suk Lee that exist today. In one interview, Nam Suk Lee reaffirmed his desire for a revival of Traditional Chang Moo Kwan and the desire for it to be its own entity and not to be a part of any outside organization. When Wiedenman asked Lee what he most wanted students and instructors to keep in the forefront of their minds when training, "cultivate capability" is simply what Lee said.

Nam Suk Lee died in his sleep August 29, 2000. He suffered a massive stroke after a relatively routine surgery earlier that year in May of that year. Upon his death, Wiedenman, as his last and highest ranking student, declared his teacher "Supreme Grandmaster" and awarded him his 10th Dan Black Belt. Wiedenman and the handful of instructors who trained with Nam Suk Lee still carry out traditional classes at several locations in Southern California and Arizona. George Fullerton, Tony Barnes, David Johns, Rome Saura, Wilson Wong, Cosmo Magiliozzi, and Darrell Cook are a few of his students still actively carrying on Nam Suk Lee's traditional teachings and forms.
