= Chang Moo Kwan =

Taekwondo schools or kwan teaching

Chang Moo Kwan Taekwondo
- Founder: Yoon Byung In and Nam Suk Lee
- Arts taught: Taekwondo (c.1955-1961 onwards, Kukkiwon system adopted in 1973) "Kwon Bop Kong Soo Do" (prior to c. 1959-1961)
- Ancestor arts: Shudokan Karate, Chinese martial arts, Gwonbeop, Kong Soo Do,

- Chang Moo Kwan
- Hangul: 창무관
- Hanja: 彰武館
- RR: Changmugwan
- MR: Ch'angmugwan

Chang Moo Kwan is a style of Korean martial arts that was founded by Yoon Byung-in and Lee Nam Suk in late 1950s.

== History ==
At the end of World War II, several Kwans were set up to teach martial arts to Korean public. In the late 1950s, spearheaded by Choi Hong Hi, these Kwans united to form what was to become known as Korea Taekwondo Association and formed the universal Korean martial art known as Taekwondo.

=== Formation (1948-c.1950) ===
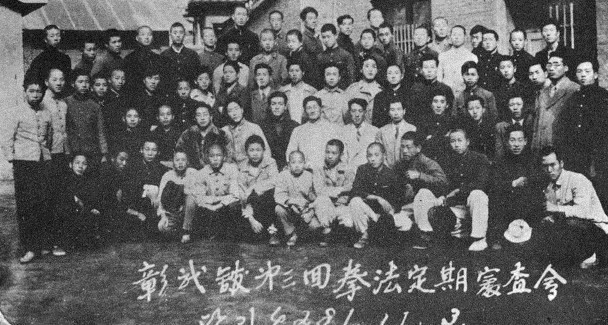
A commemorative photo taken the 3rd Regular Promotion Test held at YMCA Seoul, Korea on November 3, 1948.

Lee Nam Suk's teacher Byung In Yoon had founded the "YMCA Kwon Bop Bu" (권법무) in 1946. Byung In Yoon had studied Chinese Kung Fu (ch'uan-fa) under the guidance of a Mongolian instructor in Manchuria.

Yoon trained karate at university karate club in Japan with Kanken Tōyama. When he trained Karate in Japan, Japanese karate students pursued the Korean student and beat them up. Yoon Byung-in angered by the Japanese karate students, sprung into action using Chuan-fa. He deflected and evaded the karate students’ strikes and kicks to the point that they gave up and ran back to tell their teacher about what happened.

Kanken Tōyama invited Yoon Byung-in to tell him about the non-karate martial art he used against his students. Yoon Byung-in explained to Toyama about his Chuan-fa education in Manchuria. Toyama appreciated the Chuan-fa background since he (Toyama) had studied Chuan-fa in Taiwan for 7 years, previously. They decided to exchange knowledge; Yoon Byung-in would teach Toyama Kanken Chuan-fa and Toyama Kanken would teach Yoon Byung-in his Shudo-Ryu karate. Yoon later created his art and called as Kwon Bop Kong Soo Do.

Unlike other future taekwondo kwans, early Chang Moo Kwan was mainly based on Chinese Kung Fu (ch'uan-fa). In its infancy, the Kwan taught art known as Palgi kwon (which influenced by Bajiquan).

On the outset of the Korean War, Yoon Byung-in had travelled to North Korea's side in August 1950 accompanying his older brother, Yoon Byung-du, a Captain in the North Korean Army. Yoon would remain to live in North Korea to his death in 1983.

=== Chang Moo Kwan and unification (c.1950-1961) ===
Following Yoon's disappearance, Lee Nam Suk took over the duties as head of the kwan and changed the name of the school to Chang Moo Kwan circa 1953.

In 1955, the various martial arts kwans bonded to find a common name for the martial art they were promoting. Eventually, the united kwans under leadership of Choi Hong Hi founded this unified national Korean art and named it Taekwondo. Therefore, Chang Moo Kwan too adopted the Taekwondo as their art, at cost of its original uniqueness.

In September 1961, the Korean Taekwondo Association (KTA) was formed and Lee Nam Suk was appointed as the organization's Chair of General Director in 1961. Lee resigned only months later, in January 1962.

== Organization ==
=== Before KTA ===
In the early YMCA Kwon Bup Bu and Chang Moo Kwan, the curriculum mainly consisted of karate and chuan-fa (McLain, 2009). This was unlike other taekwondo kwans (schools) at the time.

This was one of two Kwans to have been influenced by Chuan-fa (Kwon Bup), which gave the techniques a smooth yet hard appearance when practiced or demonstrated.

Chuan-fa forms from the Chang Moo Kwan included Dan Kwon (단권, short fist), Chang Kwon (장권, Long Fist), Tai Jo Kwon (태조권, Fist of the Founding King or Great Ancestor Fist), Pal Gi Kwon (팔기권, Eighth Manchurian Cavalry), and Doju San (토조산, Escaping Mist) and others.

Early students practiced a bong hyung (staff form) created by Yoon Byung-In himself and another created by Yoon Kwe-Byung, who was a Shudokan practitioner and became a grandmaster of the Jidokwan.

=== Present ===
Today, the official Taekwondo Chang Moo Kwan still exists in Korea as a fraternal friendship club with its office in a youth athletic club in Seoul. The current president of Chang Moo Kwan is Grandmaster Kim Joong Young. Grandmaster Kim is also on the Kukkiwon High Dan Promotion Committee. The official martial arts curriculum of Chang Moo Kwan is the Kukkiwon system. Chang Moo Kwan, like all of the main Kwans, supports the Kukkiwon and the WTF.

Aside from the official Chang Moo Kwan, Traditional taekwondo Yonmujae Association (태권도연무재) preserves the old style taekwondo practice of Chang Moo Kwan through the founding masters who learned of taekwondo and obtained blackbelts from Chang Moo Kwan in 1960's. TYA, nevertheless, is an independent taekwondo school from the official Chang Moo Kwan, Kukkiwon or World Taekwondo.

== Name ==
When translating into English, Chang Moo Kwan can have different meanings. A literal translation is as follows: Chang means to create or develop, Moo translates to martial arts, and Kwan to house.

== See also ==
- Original masters of taekwondo
- Kwan (martial arts)
- Korean martial arts
