= Kwan (martial arts) =

Taekwondo schools or kwan teaching

Kwan (hanja: 館; hangul: 관) in Korean literally means building or hall, but in the context of martial arts can also refer to a school or clan of martial artists who follow the same style or leader.

== Five kwans and nine kwans in taekwondo ==
- Song Moo Kwan (송무관) – first of the original kwans, founded in Kaesong on March 20, 1944 by Ro Byung Jik (노병직), who had studied karate under Gichin Funakoshi along with Chung Do Kwan founder Lee Won-kuk in Japan.
- Chung Do Kwan (청도관) – second kwan dojang in Korea founded in September 1944 by Lee Won Kuk (이원국). He studied Taekkyeon in Seoul, He also studied Shotokan karate in Japan, Kung Fu in Henan and Shanghai in China, and other.
- Moo Duk Kwan (무덕관) – founded in 1945 by Hwang Kee (황기) teaching Hwa Soo Do. Hwang studied Taekkyon, and some types of kung fu like tai chi in China. His first two attempts at running a school of Hwa Soo Do were unsuccessful. After 1946, realizing that most Koreans were unfamiliar with the Chinese-based arts he was teaching, he incorporated the more familiar, Japanese-influenced Tang Soo Do into his curriculum. By 1953 and onward until 1960, Moo Duk Kwan had risen to become the biggest martial arts organization in Korea, with close to 75% of all martial artists in Korea practicing Tang Soo Do Moo Duk Kwan. In 1957, Hwang discovered Soo Bahk (수박), a traditional Korean martial art from Muyedobotongji (무예도보통지). In 1960, the Korean Soo Bahk Do (수박도) Association was incorporated and officially registered with the Korean government as the traditional Korean martial art. The following year, the Moo Duk Kwan Soo Bahk Do discipline was recognized internationally for the first time.
- Ji Do Kwan (지도관) – Chosun Yun Mu Kwan Kong Soo Do Club (조선연무관 공수도부, Chosun Yun Mu Kwan had been the original Japanese Kodokan Judo school in Korea for over 30 years previously) founded March 3, 1946 by Chun Sang Sup (전상섭), who had studied Shotokan karate with Gichin Funakoshi in Japan, and later called his art Kong Soo Do (공수도). He had a very close relationship with Yoon Byung-In, founder of YMCA Kwon Bop Club. Chun and Yoon would travel to train with other martial artists, sometimes traveling to Manchuria. They trained with each other so much that they became known as brothers. Chun went missing during the Korean War; subsequently, this kwan voted to change its name to 'Jidokwan'. After Chun disappeared, the original students of Chun voted Master Yoon Kwe-byung (윤쾌병, Trained Chuan Fa in Manchuria) as Jidokwan's First President.
- Chang Moo Kwan (창무관) – YMCA Kwon Bop Club (YMCA 권법부) founded in 1946 by Yoon Byung-in (윤병인), who had studied Chinese Kung Fu (Quan fa). When he studied in Nihon University, he trained in Shudokan karate under grandmaster Kanken Tōyama. Unlike other taekwondo kwans, early Chang Moo Kwan was mainly based on Chinese Kung Fu. The early Chang Moo Kwan taught Palgi kwon (팔기권), which was influenced by Bajiquan. Yoon went missing during the Korean War. His teachings were carried on by his top student Lee Nam Suk, who changed the name of the school to Chang Moo Kwan. 10th Dan Grandmaster Soon Bae Kim was one of two Kukkiwon 10th Dans in charge of Kukkiwon testing.

=== Nine kwans ===
The phrase nine kwans refers to the original five schools plus four major schools that opened after the conclusion of the Korean War. After the war, students from the original five kwans began opening their own schools, known as annex kwans. By 1960, the number of kwans in Korea had increased to 40. Shortly after the Korean War, at the urging of the South Korean government, the Korea Taekwondo Association (KTA) was established to consolidate and unify the kwans. By 1974, the KTA had succeeded in consolidating the 40 schools into nine major schools. By 1978 the KTA had coordinated the Unification Proclamation, in which all nine remaining kwans agree to abide by Kukkiwon-style taekwondo and rank promotions. Note however that many of the schools split during this period, with some factions still practicing (even today) their original martial arts styles.

- Han Moo Kwan (한무관) – founded in August 1954 by Lee Kyo Yoon as an offshoot of the Yun Moo Kwan (Jidokwan).
- Oh Do Kwan (오도관) – founded in 1955 by Choi Hong Hi, who also became honorary head of the Chung Do Kwan. Top instructors were Nam Tae Hi and Han Cha Kyo.
- Kang Duk Won (강덕원) – founded in 1956 by Park Chul Hee and Hong Jong Pyo as an offshoot of Kwon Bop Bu (Chang Moo Kwan).
- Jung Do Kwan (정도관) – founded in 1956 by Lee Yong Woo (died August 2006) as an offshoot of Chung Do Kwan.

== See also ==
- Korean martial arts
- Taekwondo
