= Duanquan =

Duanquan 短拳
- Also known as: Short-range boxing
- Focus: Striking
- Country of origin: China
- Creator: Unknown
- Parenthood: Northern Chinese martial arts
- Olympic sport: No

Duanquan, also known as short-range boxing, is a form of kung fu practiced primarily in the Hebei province of China. It is a short-range style created specifically for combat. The founder of this art is unknown except that it evolved more than four hundred years ago.

A highly-dynamic and combat-oriented martial art, duanquan focuses on short and compact routines, low stances, and quick movements. Students are taught to be highly mobile, in order to keep the opponent disoriented and unable to attack. Low stances and small but quick movements are major features of this style. The arms and legs are bent slightly. They also use simple and sudden moves and the techniques are executed smartly, wasting no energy. By practicing duanquan, students improve their physique as well as sharpen their instincts and skills in close-range combat.

Movements are well connected and fist techniques follow in quick succession often with sudden changes. Practitioners of duanquan rarely jump or leap. The duanquan fighter moves around to avoid the opponent's attack and then moves in close to deliver multiple counter-attacks.
