= Gwonbeop =

Korean unarmed martial art

Korean name
- Hangul: 권법
- Hanja: 拳法
- RR: gwonbeop
- MR: kwŏnpŏp

Gwonbeop (Korean: 권법) is a system of unarmed methods in Korean martial arts which was developed during the Joseon era (15th to 19th centuries). It is the Korean rendition of the Chinese quan fa (拳法).

== Early history ==
Destruction of the Korean palace and its libraries in 1126 and the 1231 Mongol invasion and domination of Korea (Yuan dynasty, 1231–1356) eliminated Korea's prior literary history, and no first-hand accounts of the origins of gwonbeop are extant. In 1145, King Injong (r. 1112–1146) ordered Confucian scholar Kim Bu-sik to compile the Samguk Sagi (History of the Three Kingdoms). About a century later a Buddhist monk, Iryeon, compiled the Samguk Yusa (Memorabilia of the Three Kingdoms). According to both works, militancy between and among the three major states during the Three Kingdoms period (37 BC–660 AD) resulted in each state developing an institution for training warriors. Although the term gwonbeop was not used, cadets of the Pyong Dang (educational institute) in Goguryeo learned punches and kicks (ji leu ki beop); cadets in Silla learned chil kuk (kicks) and soo bak (punches). In Baekje, open-handed fighting (soo sool) was included in the training. Consolidation of the Korean peninsula under Silla in 668 enhanced its approach to hand-to-hand combat. Infrequent references to soo bak indicate that contests in unarmed combat, often with wagering by the audience, were held on holidays and other special occasions until the invasion of Korea by the Mongols (1231–1392).

== Later development ==
With the end of Mongol dominance, incursions by wa-ko (coastal raiding forces of mixed nationalities) inspired the Korean administration to rebuild the Korean military; however, its efforts were undercut by a neo-Confucianism which deprecated militarism in favor of leadership by scholars and bureaucrats. Korea was unprepared for the 1591 invasion by Japanese armies intent on using Korea as a springboard to conquer China. Known as the Imjin Waerum, the Japanese advance overran the Korean army and was stopped only by the Ming army and Koreans who formed "righteous armies" (uibyeong, 위병). In September 1593, King Seonjo of Joseon (1567–1608) established the Hunlyun Dokam (Royal Military Training Agency). With the encouragement of Ming general Liu T’ing, Korean prime minister Yu Song-Nyong tried to reorganize the Korean army into a structured, versatile organization. His reference for this effort was Jin Xiao Shin Shu (Manual of New Military Tactics), written by Qi Jiguang (1528–1588) and published in 1567. Chapter 14 of the manual described 32 methods of hand-to-hand combat; although Qi wrote that they were of little use on the battlefield, they improved his soldiers' confidence and conditioning. These 32 methods, gleaned from an examination of 16 major fighting systems in Ming China, were recorded in 32 short poems.

After the end of hostilities in 1598, the Korean government wanted to record useful material from General Qi's manual instead of adopting it in its entirety. The Muyejebo (무예제보 속집, 武藝諸譜續集, Compendium of Several Martial Arts) was published in 1610. Commissioned by King Seonjo, the manual was compiled by military officer Han Kyo and contained six fighting methods: kon bong (long staff), dung pae (shield), nang sun (multi-tipped spear), jang chang (long spear), dang pa (triple-tip spear) and ssang soo do (two-handed saber). Four volumes of a Japanese martial-arts manual were added, leading to the compilation of the Muyejebo Beonyeoksokjip (무예제보번역속집, 武藝諸譜飜譯續集) the same year. The latter included about 30 methods of unarmed combat.

During the reign of King Yeongjo of Joseon (1694–1776), the Muyejebo was revised and supplemented with 12 additional fighting methods by Crown Prince Sado. A modified form of gwonbeop reappeared in this work. The revision, the Muyesinbo (무예신보, 武藝新譜, New Compendium of Martial Arts), was published in 1759.

During the reign of King Jeongjo of Joseon (1752–1800), the Muyesinbo was revised by Park Je-ga and Lee Duk-moo beginning in 1790. With six additional fighting skills, the "new" methods were little more than ground methods modified for mounted execution; gwonbeop was also further modified with the addition of two-party moves. Although the material was intended to reflect neo-Confucianism by having partners use methods which would produce a stalemate (rather than victory), it rapidly fell into disuse due to its lack of practical combat effectiveness. The Muyedobotongji (무예도보통지, 武藝圖譜通志, Comprehensive Illustrated Manual of Martial Arts) was published in 1795.

== Modern history ==
During the second half of the 19th century, Western practices were adopted and traditions abandoned. Bolt-action rifles, revolvers and breech-loading artillery changed military tactics and the role of the soldier. Casualties of this trend were spears, cudgels, sticks and the bow and arrow. The Russo-Japanese War (1904) and World War I demonstrated that the future of warfare lay with encounters by small units, rather than between waves of troops. Armies tried to identify ways in which an individual soldier could protect himself without a weapon. Korea's efforts were quickly eclipsed by Japan, which occupied the country from 1910 to 1945. During the occupation, Japanese forces imposed their customs on the Korean population (especially in urban areas).

Korea had a trading history across the Yellow Sea with northeastern China in general and Shandong in particular. Long associated with military science, the province gave Korea a variety of martial arts.

== Contents and structure ==
=== Ji Xiao Xin Shu ("Manual of New Military Tactics") ===
The following is a listing of the original 32 Boxing Methods identified by General Qi Jiguang in his training manual - Ji Xiao Xin Shu (紀效新書), Chapter 14, also sometimes identified as “The Boxing Canon”. Among the arts General Qi states that he examined for his material are well-known practices such as Taiso Chang Chuan ( "Zhao Taizu Long Fist"), Liu Ho Chuan ("Six-Step Boxing") and Hou Chuan ( "Monkey Boxing"). General Qi also identified “among the best contemporary styles are the "Thirty-six Posture Locking Form", "24 Throws Pat on Horse", "Eight Evasive Maneuvers", “Twelve Postures Closing Boxing”, “Lu Hungs Eight Throws” ... .”Cotton Changs’ Close Boxing", “LI Pan-tien of Shantung Leg Techniques”, “Eagle Claw Wang’s Grappling Techniques”, “Thousand Falls Chang’s Falling Techniques”, “CHANG Po-chings’ Striking Techniques". Having been disappointed with the poor quality of conscripts coming from China's cities, General Qi drew heavily from the rural areas for the hardiness of its farmers. As a result, many allusions to training, and training methods, mentioned in General Qi's writing use non-technical, even fanciful titles and terms which could be appreciated by an illiterate rural conscript. This format was continued through the Joseon dynasty and some examples of the Korean equivalent for Chinese labels are given in the following list. As was the custom for such writing during the Ming dynasty, each method is characterized by a brief poem structured according to the manner of those times and identified with a title which captured the essence of the fighting method. (“Herein we have illustrated the postures and annotated them with aphorisms to enlighten future students.”) An example of this is provided at the end of the listing.

1. Casually Hitch-up your Clothes: Identifies the need for both mental and physical preparation for an encounter
2. Golden Rooster: Stand on One Leg: Identifies the Importance of Balance relative to terrain (Note: "Golden Cockerel stands on One Leg lowers and raises. Feint with the leg and strike sideways with the fist. Throw the opponent on his back with arms and legs in the air. When the opponent encounters this technique, his cries will reach high heaven." Source: Wile, Douglas Tai Chi's Ancestors Sweet Chi Press, 1999; pgs 18–35)
3. The Spy Techniques (Scouting Horse Posture Tammase (탐 마 세) 探 馬 勢): Identifies the nature of a "Host" forward hand and a "Guest" rearhand
4. Stretch out the Whip
5. Seven Star Strike: Identifies the nature of "Inside" striking techniques
6. Mount the Dragon Backwards (Falling and Riding the Dragon Posture Dokiryongse)
7. Suspend the leg as empty bait False Prey Posture Hyunkak Huheese (현 각 허 이 세) 顯 脚 虛 餌 勢
8. The Qiu Liu Posture
9. Lower Jabbing Position
10. Ambush Crouch Posture (Ambushing Posture Maebokse)
11. Cast the Body Forward
12. Taking the Elbow in Hand Posture
13. One Instant Step (Drizzling Walk Posture Ilsahpbose (일 삽 보 세) 一 霎步 勢)
14. Capture and Grab Stance
15. Mid-Guard Posture (Middle Four Levels Posture Joongsapyeongse (중 사 평 세) 中 四 平 勢)
16. Crouched Tiger Posture (Prone Tiger Posture Bokhose (복 호 세) 伏 虎 勢)
17. High Guard Posture (High Four Levels Posture)
18. Reverse Stabbing Position
19. Well-railing Four-wise Balanced
20. Ghost Kick
21. Finger Opposition Posture
22. Beast Head Position
23. Spirit Fist
24. Single Whip (Single Whip Posture Yodanpyunse (요 단 편 세) 拗 單 鞭 勢)
25. Coiled Leg Method
26. Yang-Facing Hand
27. Wild Goose Wings (Goose Wing Posture Ahnshi Chukshinse)
28. Straddling Tiger Posture (Straddling Tiger Posture Koahose)
29. Joining Together the Luan Elbows
30. Cannonball against the Head
31. Synchronize the Luan Elbows
32. Banners and Drums Posture

=== Muye Jebo ("Martial Arts Illustrations") ===
Choe Gi-nam (Korean: 최기남; Hanja: 崔起南; 1559 - 1619) organized the Muyejebo sokjip (무예제보 속집, 武藝諸譜續集, “Martial Arts Illustrations”) and it was published in conjunction with the alternate work authored HAN Kyo in 1610. Included in this former treatise were chapters on the use of the Wol-Do, Hyup-Do, and Gwon Beop suggesting that this work was intended as an enhancement of the work by HAN Kyo rather than as a replacement for it. The figures used in Choe's book reflect the postures seen in General Qi's manual, making it reasonable that at least some of the methods were identified and functioned in the original manner identified by General Qi. However, the Korean listing provides only the title and does not characterize the nature of the method. In addition the methods have been rearranged, perhaps to reflect an alternate set of priorities regarding the associated techniques. The final two pages also show these methods organized into a continuous series or Form (K. Hyung) providing a kind of mnemonic device by which individuals were able to recall the requisite methods and, by extension, techniques associated with the methods.

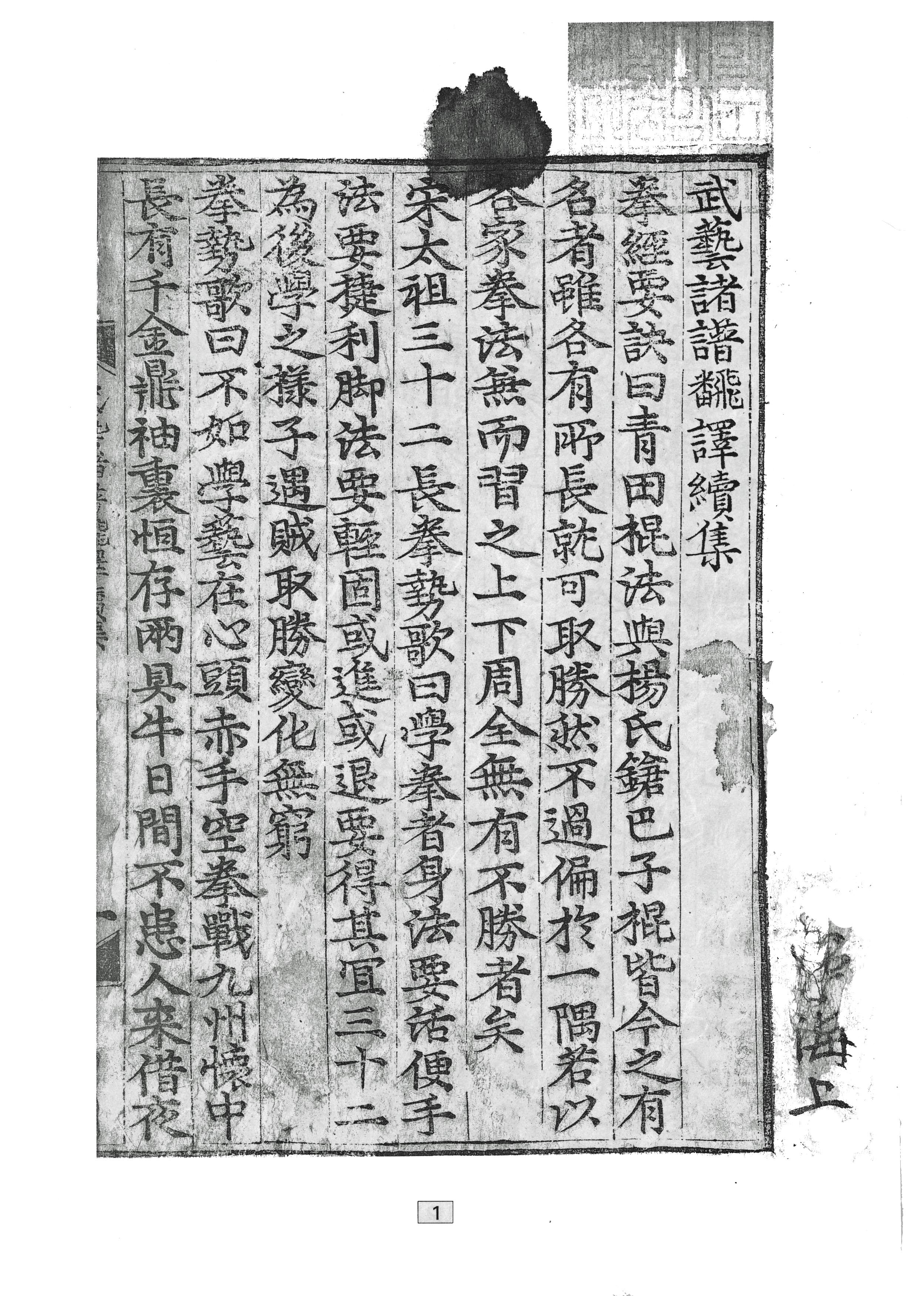
Muye Jebo - 1st page of commentary

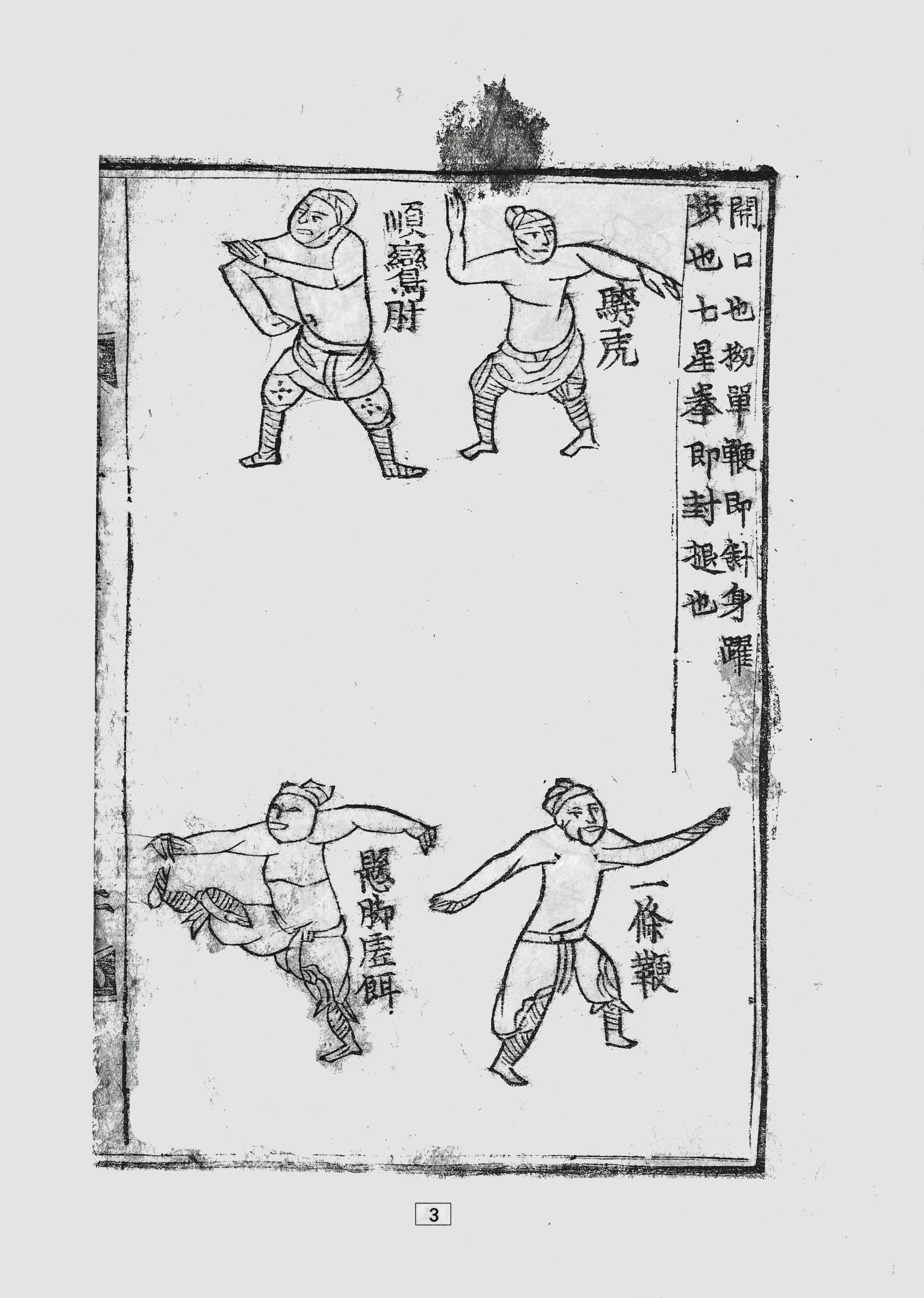
Muye Jebo - 3rd page of commentary and illustrations

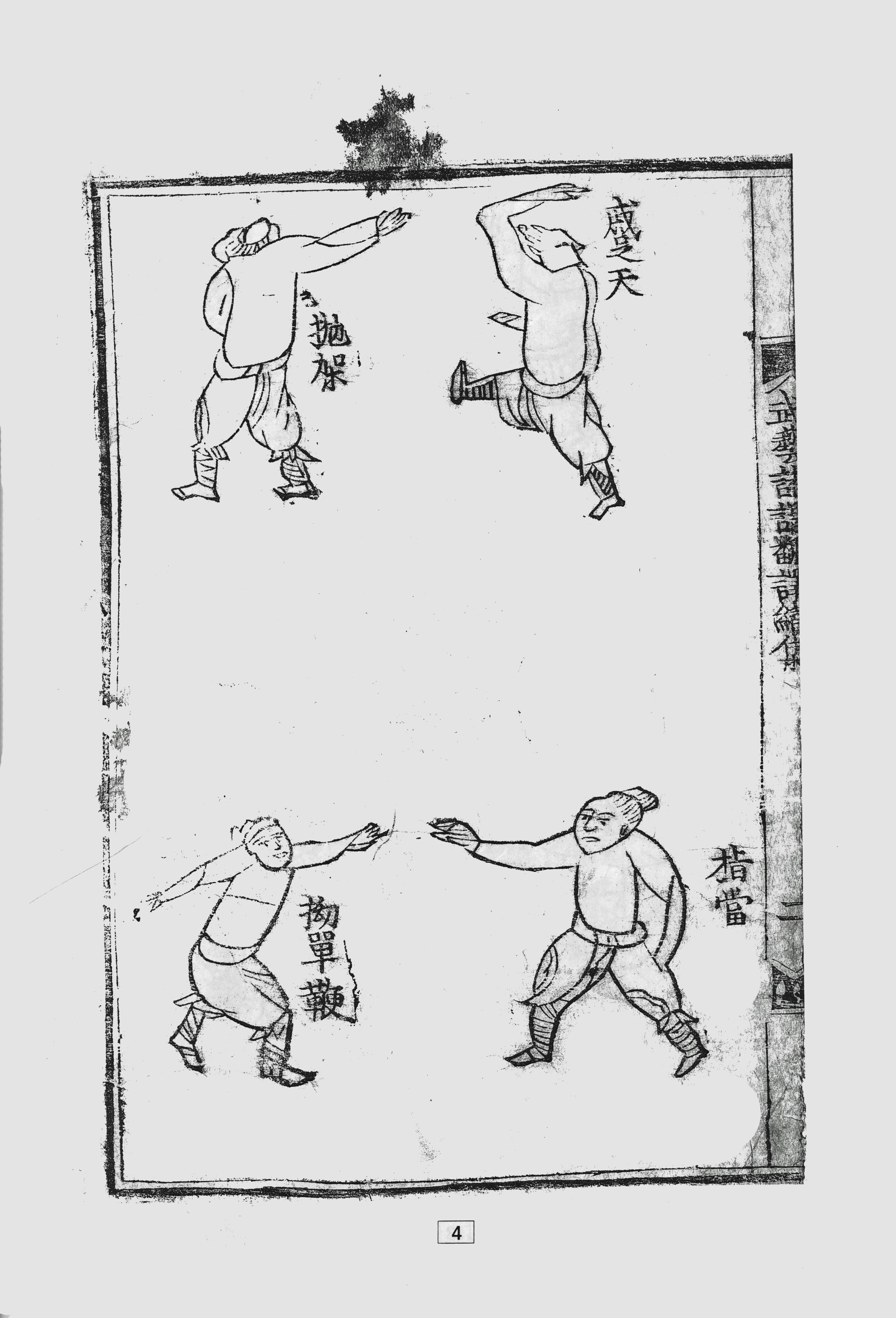
Muye Jebo - 4th page of commentary and illustrations

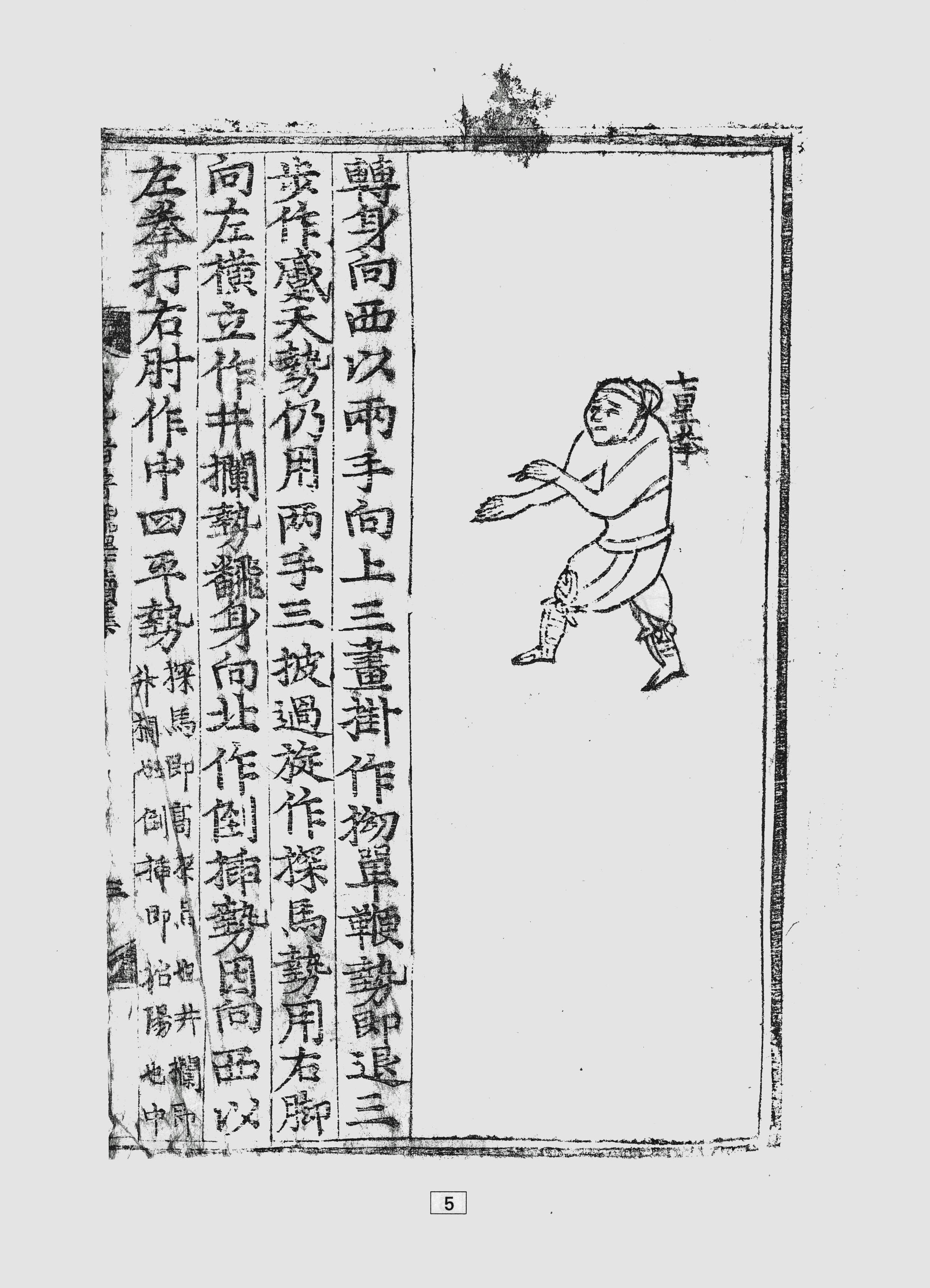
Muye Jebo - 5th page of commentary and illustrations

=== Muye Dobo Tong Ji (“Comprehensive Illustrated Manual of Martial Arts”) ===
The following pages are taken from Book 4, Chapter 1 of the “Comprehensive Illustrated Manual of Martial Arts” published in 1795. It is possible to identify similar method titles and illustrations between this material and that of the Muye Jebo and General Qi's Boxing Canon. However, there are also a number of methods which do not bear the same name and may be methods introduced by the Korean administration of the time. In similar fashion one cannot be sure that a method bearing the same title as that designated by General Qi was executed in the same fashion or was even the same method. This manual retained use of the same images, making it reasonable that at least some of the methods were identified and functioned in the original manner identified by General Qi. However, once again, the Korean listing provides only the title and does not characterize the nature of the method. Since this list includes the total number of methods mentioned in the Muyedobotongji, each individual method is noted in bold representing 32 unique methods with repetition not found in General Qi's catalog. In addition the methods have been rearranged, to include a number of engagements between two individuals. In deference to the Neo-Confucian beliefs of the Korean nation at the time, these encounters between two individuals were intended to produce a kind of stalemate rather than the victory of one individual over another. The final two page also show the methods of the chapter organized into a continuous series or Form (K. Hyung) providing a kind of mnemonic device by which individuals were able to recall the requisite methods and, by extension, techniques associated with the methods.

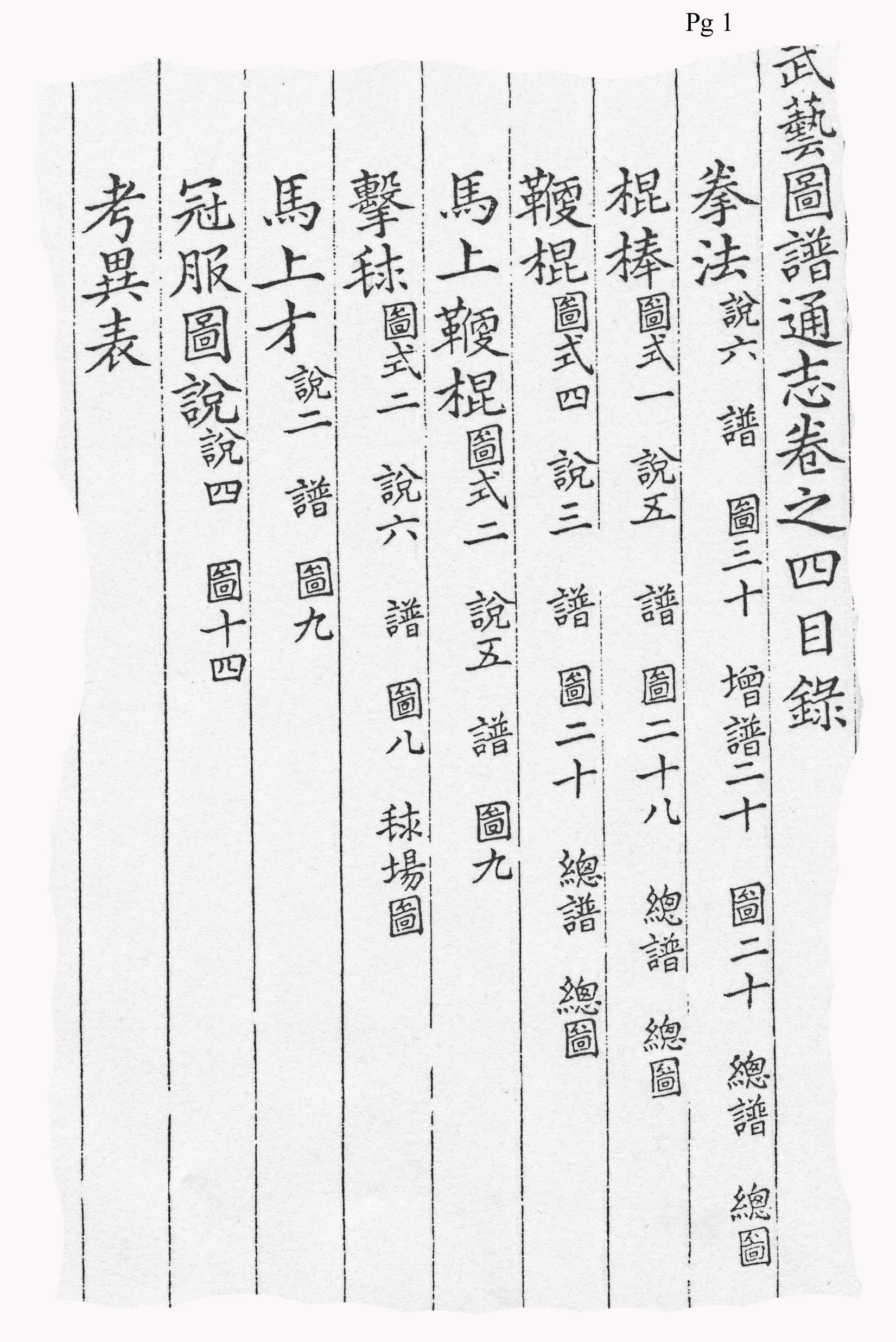
Index to Book No. 4

1. Scouting Horse Posture Tammase (탐 마 세) 探 馬 勢

2. Breaking Bird Elbow Yoranjuse (요 란 주 세) 拗 鸞 肘 勢

3. False Prey Posture Hyunkak Huheese (현 각 허 이 세) 顯 脚 虛 餌 勢

4. Docile Bird WingSunranjuse (순 란 주 세)順 鸞 肘 勢

5. Seven Star Fist Posture Chil Sung Kwonse ( 칠 성 권)七 星 拳

6. High Four levels Posture Kosapyeongse ( 고 사 평 세) 高 四 平 勢

7. Throwing Posture Dosahpse (도 삽 세) 倒 揷 勢

8. Lightning-Step Posture Ilsahpbose (일 삽 보 세) 一 霎 步 勢

9. Single Whip Posture Yodanpyunse (요 단 편 세) 拗 單 鞭 勢

10. Prone Tiger Posture Bokhose (복 호 세) 伏 虎 勢

11. False Prey Posture Hyunkak Huheese (현 각 허 이 세) 顯 脚 虛 餌 勢

12. Pinning Posture Hasahpse

13. High Block Posture Dangdupose

14. Flag Beating Posture Kigose

15. Middle Four Levels Posture Joongsapyeongse (중 사 평 세) 中 四 平 勢

16. Throwing Posture Dosahpe

17. Falling and Riding the Dragon Posture Dokiryongse

18. Single Whip Posture Yodanpyunse (요 단 편 세) 拗 單 鞭 勢

19. Ambushing Posture Maebokse

20. False Prey Posture Hyunkak Huheese (현 각 허 이 세) 顯 脚 虛 餌 勢

21. Pinning Posture Hasahpse

22. High Block Posture Dangdupose

23. Flag Beating Posture Kigose

24. Four levels Posture Kosapyeongse ( 고 사 평 세) 高 四 平 勢

25. Throwing Posture Dosahpse

26. Drizzling Walking Posture Ilsahpse

27. Single Whip Posture Yodanpyunse (요 단 편 세) 拗 單 鞭 勢

28. Five Flowers Winding Around the Body Posture Ohwa Junshinse

29. Goose Wing Posture Ahnshi Chukshinse

30. Straddling Tiger Posture Koahose

31. False Prey Posture Hyunkak Huheese (현 각 허 이 세) 顯 脚 虛 餌 勢

32. Focus and Winning Posture Kooyuse

33. Goose Wing Posture Ahnshi Chukshinse

34. Straddling Tiger Posture Koahose

35. False Prey Posture Hyunkak Huheese (현 각 허 이 세) 顯 脚 虛 餌 勢

36. Focus and Winning Posture Kooyuse

37. Goose Wing Posture Ahnshi Chukshinse

38. Straddling Tiger Posture Koahose

39. Prone Tiger Posture Bokhose

40. Arresting Posture Kumnase

41. Prone Tiger Posture Bokhose

42. Arresting Posture Kumnase

43. Throwing Shelf Posture Pogase

44. Picking Elbow Posture Jumjuse

45. Low Encountering Posture Nachaluichoolmun

46. Single Leg Throwing Posture Kumkye Doklip Jugi Jangtoi

47. Spring Railing Posture Jungranse

48. Ghost Kicking and leg striking Posture Kichuk Kakchange

49. Open Finger Attacking Posture Ji Dang Se

50. Beast Head Shield Posture Soodoose

51. Heavenly Fist Posture Shin kwon

52. Whipping Lunging Posture Iljo Pyunhweng Se

53. Dragon Prey Snatching Posture Jakjiryong Habantoibup

54. Slanting Hero Hand Posture Joyangsoo Pyunshin Bangtoi

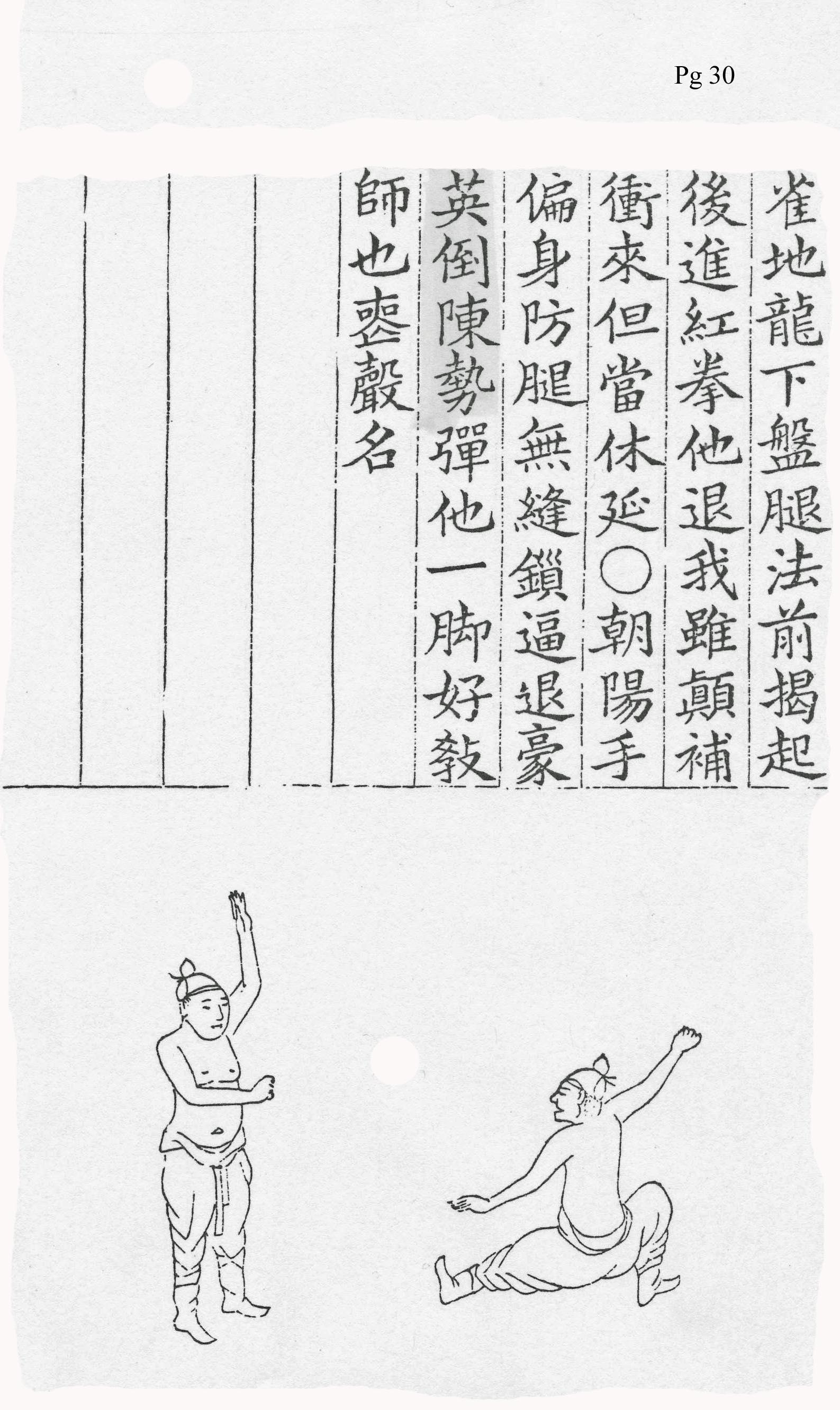
29th Page of Commentary and Illustrations

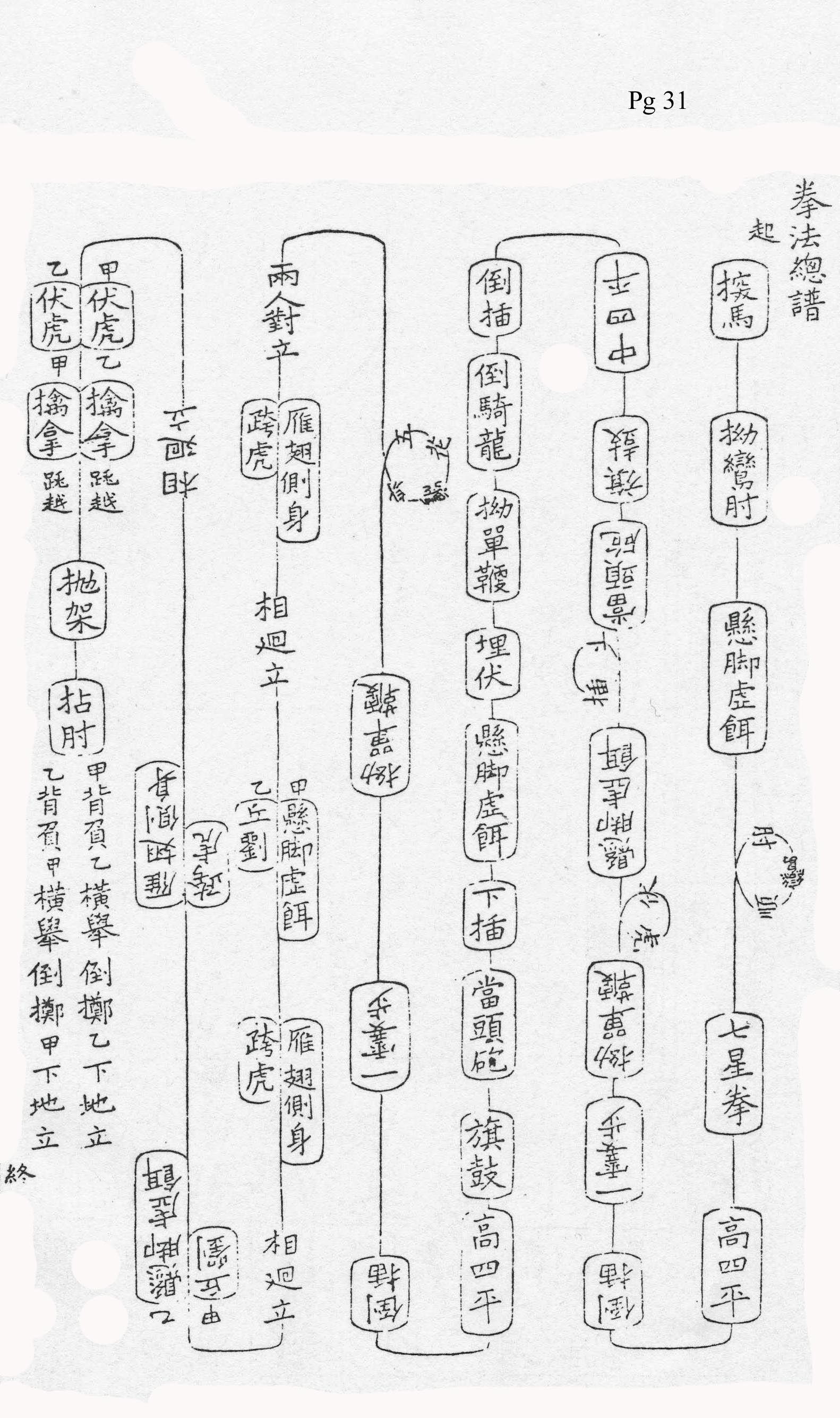
30th Page of Commentary and Illustrations

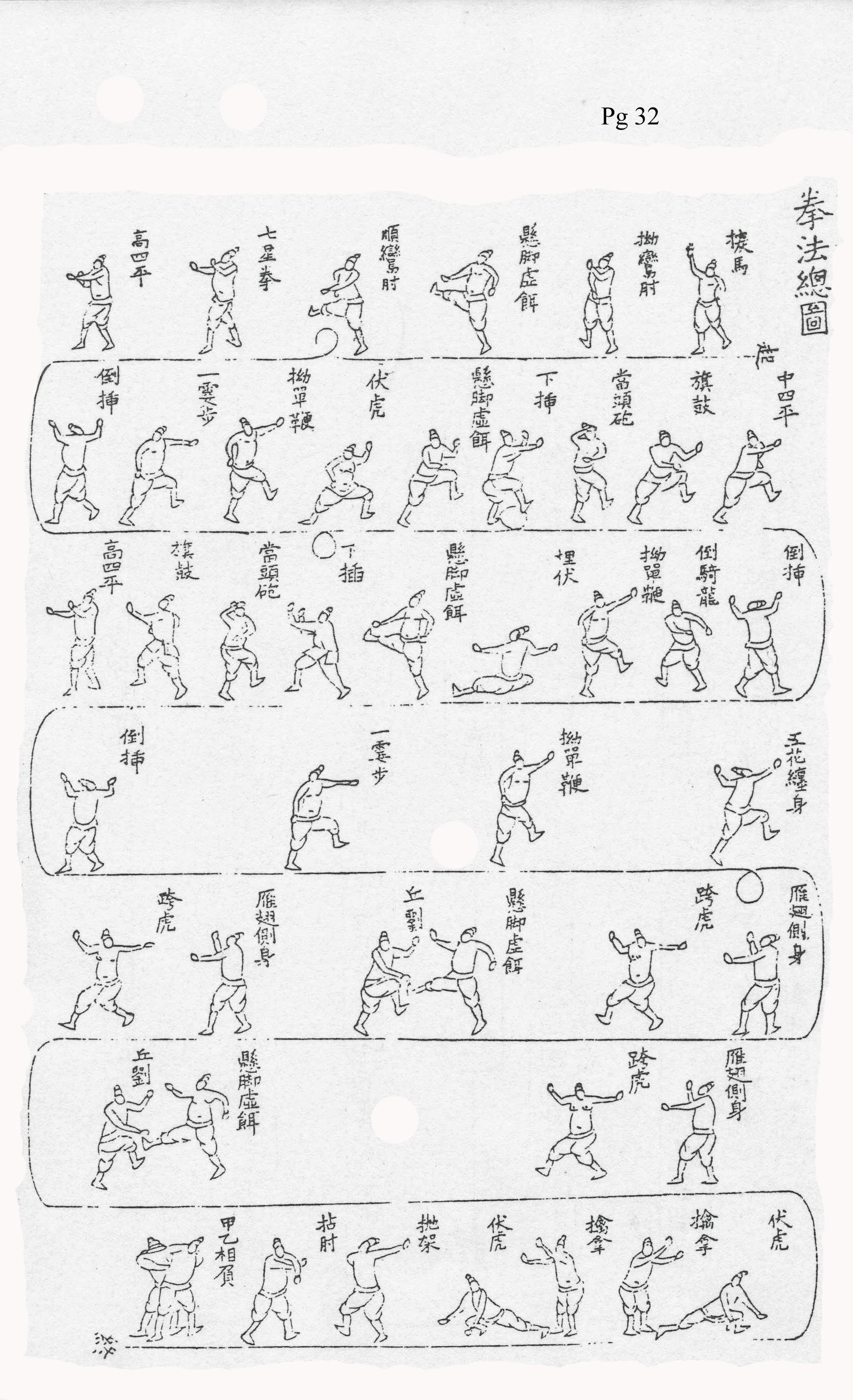
31st Page of Commentary and Illustrations

=== Analysis of methods and applications ===
In his introduction to the 14th Chapter of his military training manual - Quanjing Jieyao Pian ("Chapter on the Fist Canon and the Essentials of Nimbleness") - General Qi coined the terms by which later practices organized their material: Striking (Ti), Kicking (Da), Wrestling (Shuai), and Submission (Na) as well as being the first to distinguish between Short Fist and Long Fist types of Boxing. Though known for centuries before his time, most practices had been unique to a particular unit, or a particular geographic area from which conscripts were drawn. General Qi first organized his material along these four categories with the intention of developing a Military Science that would inter-relate to the other weapons and duties of the soldier. Further, General Qi identified the role of unarmed training by stipulating three outcomes. The first was Conditioning of the soldiers' body wherein the observation was made that "This craft does not really concern itself with military weapons, but acquiring excess strength is also something which those in the military field ought to practice". That said, General Qi went on to acknowledge that the relationship between the use of weapons and those skills of unarmed training ought not be discounted. ("In general the hand, staff, broadsword, spear....all proceed from barehanded techniques to train the body and the hands.") and is clearly the second intended outcome to this training. Lastly, a strong spirit through the cultivation of self-confidence is understood from the General's advocacy for matching his soldiers against one another. As stated towards the end of his introduction, "If you are afraid of your opponent then your skill is still shallow. If you are good at contests it must be that the art is refined. The ancients said, 'when the art is high, the peoples courage is great.' This is credible".

Gwon Beop methods are very much an expression of the culture and circumstances in which they were used. Use of the famed "Mandarin Duck" formation as well as small unit tactics that followed, obviated the need to consider much beyond threats directly to the front and rear as the flanks of any one unit were secured by units to either side. In this way an adversary could be viewed, essentially as a matrix of nine squares consisting of a left, right and middle square at a high, middle and low level. In response to this matrix, a defender could respond with various combinations of an active or passive front hand, an active or passive rear hand as well as an active or passive front or rear foot. Similarly, a secondary matrix could be envisioned to the rear in the case that an adversary was able to make his way behind the formation. While an initial assessment might suggest an overwhelming number of options, experience soon demonstrates which method or combination of methods are the most efficient and effective in producing the desired outcome. In this way certain techniques came to be identified with certain circumstances, methods or postures and these were the determinations that were made by the training cadre. Regardless of the specific technique, illustrations and descriptions of the biomechanic being employed are commonly represented in General Qi's work at the moment at which the adversary is engaged.

== See also ==
- Muyedobotongji
