= Korea Taekwondo Association =

Taekwondo Association

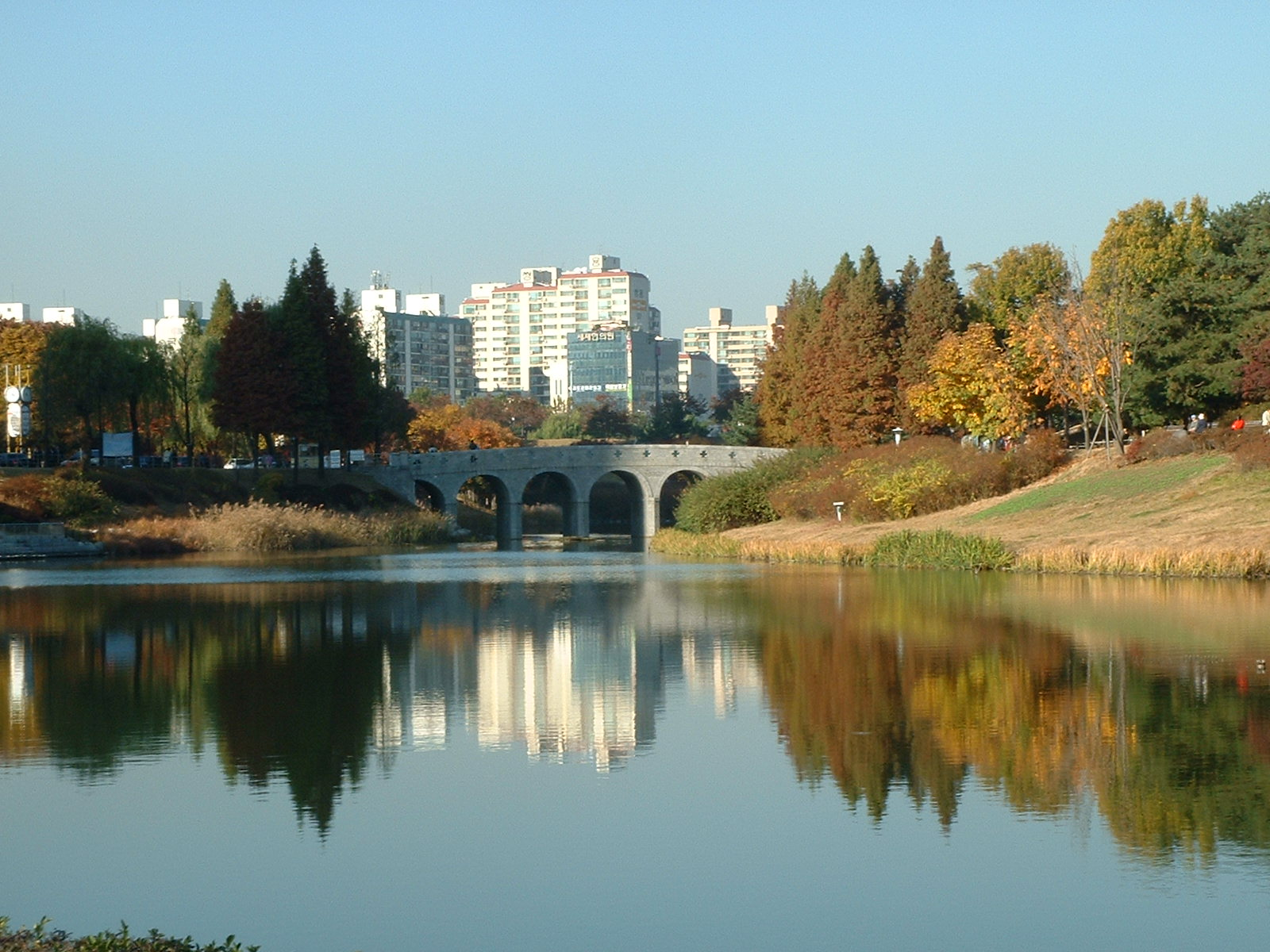
- The Korea Taekwondo Association is based in Olympic Park, Seoul, South Korea
- Abbreviation: KTA
- Formation: 1959
- Type: Government Organisation
- Purpose: Sport
- Headquarters: Olympic Park
- Location: Seoul
- Region served: South Korea
- Official language: Korean
- President: Jin Bang Yang
- Parent organization: Korea Sports Council
- Website: www.koreataekwondo.org

Korea Taekwondo Association (Korean: 대한 태권도 협회; Hanja: 大韓 跆拳道 協會; KTA), originally the Korea Tae Soo Do Association, is the first taekwondo organization. It was founded in 1961, and in 1963 it received approval to join the Korean Sports Council.

The Kukkiwon and World Taekwondo (formerly known as the World Taekwondo Federation) were established by the KTA in the early and late 1970s, respectively. Today, the KTA is aligned with Kukkiwon and serves as the Member National Association (MNA) of World Taekwondo. Its mission is to promote taekwondo as a national sport within South Korea.

== History ==
The history of the KTA has been marked by political challenges, including those associated with the outbreak of the Korean War in 1950.

=== First attempts ===
The process of unifying the various Korean martial arts schools, or kwan, was long and complex. Following the Korean independence movement of 1945, many leading masters of the main kwan began discussing the unification of Korean martial arts, which had been severely suppressed during the Japanese occupation. Their aim was to revive traditional Korean martial arts by consolidating them into a single and cohesive discipline.

An initial attempt to harmonize the different styles practiced within the various kwan took place in July 1946, when several masters, including Byung Jick Ro (founder of Song Moo Kwan), Sang Sup Chun (founder of Yun Moo Kwan, later renamed Ji Do Kwan), Won Kyo Lee (founder of Chung Do Kwan), and Byung In Yoon (founder of what would later become Chang Moo Kwan), agreed to standardize the teaching methods of the martial arts practiced in their respective schools. The outbreak of the Korean War interrupted this process, leading to the dispersal of many masters across different regions of the country. Some of them took refuge in Pusan, where they established the Korean Kongsoodo Federation, an initiative regarded as the first concrete attempt to unify Korean martial arts.

=== Towards the creation of the KTA ===
Several years after the end of the Korean War, leading representatives of the kwan resumed efforts toward unification. Between 1959 and 1961, multiple organizations were formed with this objective. Among these, a group composed primarily of members of the Chung Do Kwan and led by General Choi Hong Hi gained prominence, alongside the Unified Consolidation Committee, established in September 1961.

The group led by Choi Hong Hi also established an organization called the Korea Taekwondo Association; however, it was entirely unrelated to the current Korea Taekwondo Association, which was founded by the Unified Consolidation Committee under the original name of Korea Taesoodo Association (KTA). The position of president of the KTA initially remained vacant, while Un Kyu Uhm and Chong Woo Lee were appointed vice presidents. In June 1962, the association was admitted as a member of the Korean Olympic Committee, and later that year Myung Shin Chae assumed office as the first president of the KTA.

In 1965, the Korean Taesoodo Association was officially renamed the Korea Taekwondo Association. The change occurred during the term of Choi Hong Hi, who had by then joined the association, and marked the return to the official use of the term taekwondo, which had been coined in 1955.

During the 1960s, the KTA assembled the twelve original masters of taekwondo to promote taekwondo throughout the world.

=== The establishment of the Kukkiwon ===
In January 1967, following the end of Byung Jick Ro’s term, the presidency of the KTA passed to Yong Chae Kim, a prominent figure within the ruling political party at the time. Kim initiated plans for the creation of a central training hall dedicated to taekwondo. He succeeded in securing approximately 28 million won — equivalent to about US$30,000 at the time — from state funds for the construction of what was referred to as the Central Dojang. After the appointment of Un Yong Kim as the seventh president of the KTA in January 1971, the Central Dojang project took definitive shape. The plan called for the construction of a building covering more than 4,000 square metres. The proposed site was located on the plateau of Yeoksam-dong, then an undeveloped area, with the intention of creating a structure that would serve as a symbol of strength and national identity overlooking the city. Construction of the main building began on 19 November 1971 and was completed on 30 November 1972.

=== Late 20th century ===
Un Yong Kim held the presidency of both the KTA and the Kukkiwon for more than 20 years. During his tenure, he played a central role in the establishment of World Taekwondo. While his leadership has been criticized in later years for its authoritarian aspects, he provided two decades of organizational stability.

During Kim's term, the Declaration for the Unification of the Kwan was signed on 5 August 1978 by representatives of the major Kwan existing at the time, along with the directors of the Central Dojang (the former name of the Kukkiwon). The signatories included:

- Promoters of the Kukkiwon Foundation: Yong Chae Kim, Un Yong Kim
- The Nine Kwan and their representatives: Song Moo Kwan, Han Moo Kwan, Chang Moo Kwan, Moo Duk Kwan, Oh Do Kwan, Kang Duk Won, Jung Do Kwan, Ji Do Kwan, Chung Do Kwan.
- Promoters of the Unification of the Kwan: Won Sik Kang, Byung Ro Lee.
- Promoters of Poomsae Unification: Young Sup Lee, Soon Bae Kim, Hae Man Park.

=== Since 2000 ===
The early 2000s were a time of trouble for the KTA leadership. One source states that Un Yong Kim resigned from the KTA presidency in 2001, while other sources state that in 1997, Pil Gon Rhee was already in place as President of the KTA. In any case, Kim presided over the organisation for around 20 years. In March 2002, Cheon Seo Koo was elected President of the KTA, and held that position until at least 2004, though news sources have reported that he was arrested in late 2003.

In early 2008, Jung Gil Kim was President of the KTA. On 11 June 2008, Joon Pyo Hong was elected as the 25th President of the KTA, and he continued in the position in 2009.

== List of presidents ==
Since the foundation of the KTA, 29 presidents have served in office. The current president is Jin Bang Yang.

No.	President	Term of office			Notes
No.	President	Start	End	Length	Notes
1	Myung Shin Chae (채명신)	15 December 1962	2 April 1964	1 year, 4 months	
2	Jong Tae Park (박종태)	3 April 1964	14 January 1965	9 months	
3	Choi Hong Hi (최홍희)	15 January 1965	29 January 1966	1 year	In mid-1965, he decided to rename Tae Soo Do as “Taekwondo” (although the term had already been coined in 1955), also changing the association’s name to Korea Taekwondo Association. After being removed from office as KTA president, he founded the International Taekwondo Federation (ITF) in 1966.
4	Byung Jick Ro (노병직)	30 January 1966	29 January 1967	1 year	Founder of the Song Moo Kwan.
5–6	Yong Chae Kim (김용채)	30 January 1967	16 January 1971	3 years, 11 months	
7–14	Un Yong Kim (김운용)	17 January 1971	16 January 1991	20 years	President of both the KTA and the Kukkiwon. During his tenure the World Taekwondo was established.
15–16	Se Chang Choi (최세창)	17 January 1991	25 January 1996	5 years	
17–18	Pil Gon Lee (이필곤)	26 January 1996	2 November 1998	2 years, 9 months	
19–20	Un Yong Kim (김운용)	3 November 1998	11 November 2001	3 years	
21	Cheon Seo Gu (구천서)	5 February 2002	14 January 2004	1 year, 11 months	
Acting	Gyu Seok Lee (이규석)	29 January 2004	26 February 2004	1 month	
22–23	Jeong Gil Kim (김정길)	27 February 2004	30 April 2008	4 years, 2 months	
24–25	Joon Pyo Hong (홍준표)	11 June 2008	4 February 2013	4 years, 8 months	
26	Tae Hwan Kim (김태환)	5 February 2013	29 January 2016	2 years, 11 months	
27	Seung Wan Lee (이승완)	29 February 2016	4 September 2016	6 months	
28	Chang Shin Choi (최창신)	28 November 2016	17 November 2020	4 years	
29	Jin Bang Yang (양진방)	19 January 2021	–	Incumbent	

== Rank promotions ==
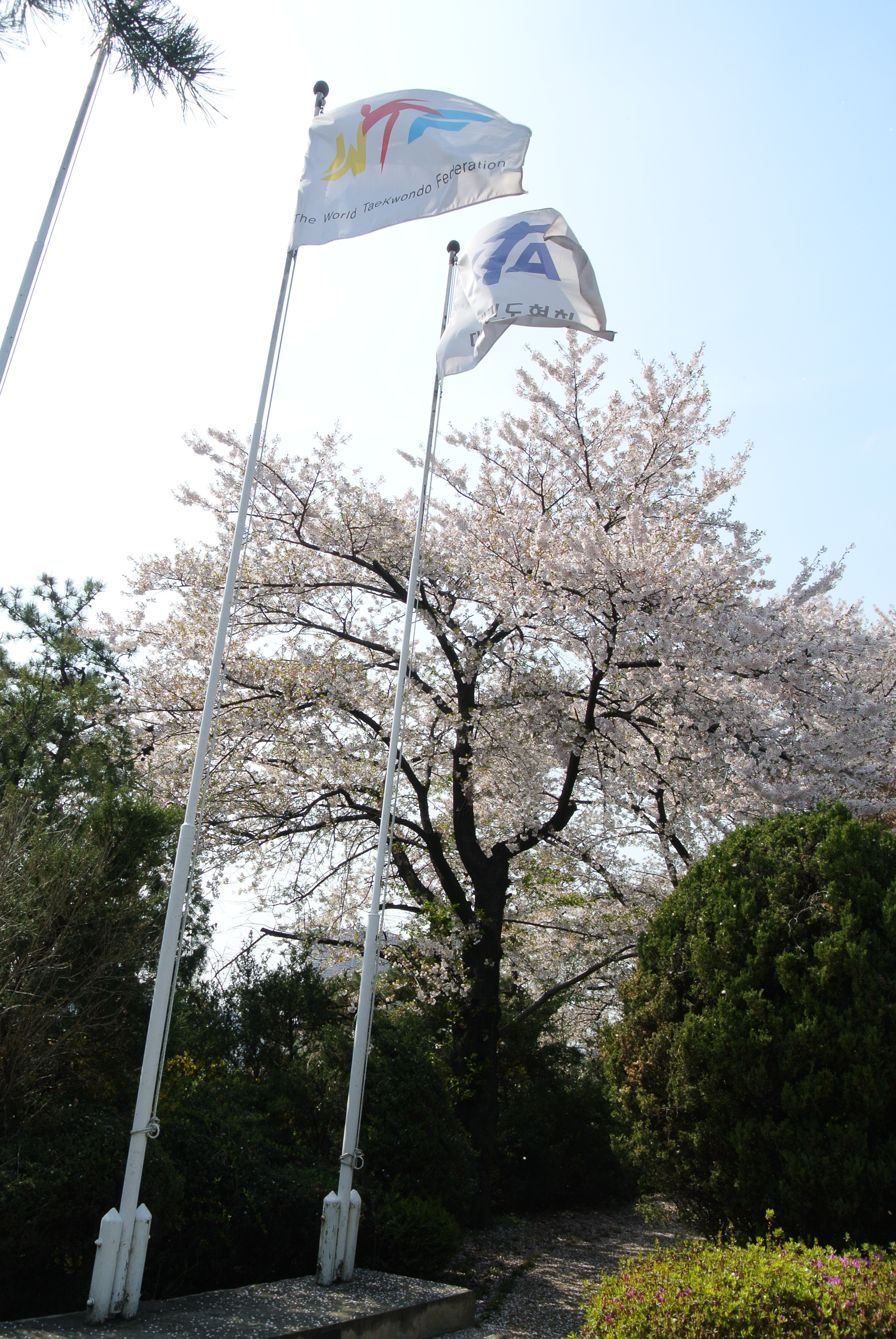
Flagpoles and flags of the World Taekwondo Federation and of the Korean Taekwondo Association at the Kukkiwon in Seoul

The first official KTA dan promotion test was held on 11 November 1962, inaugurating a schedule of six examination sessions per year . Following the opening of the Kukkiwon in 1972, the administration of rank examinations was transferred to the new institution. In 1980, the KTA also delegated the issuance of Dan and Poom certificates to the Kukkiwon, a decision that took effect on 1 March 1980. In July 1984, the issuance of Dan certificates for non-Korean practitioners was temporarily delegated to the World Taekwondo, resulting in a period during which certificates were issued by two separate organizations. By the end of 1987, it was determined that the Kukkiwon would become the sole authority responsible for issuing ranks, effective 1 January 1988. To ensure uniformity in examinations, regulations were introduced to reinforce the central role of the Kukkiwon in evaluation procedures at both national and international levels.

=== Poom rank: examinations for children ===
In 1970, beginning with the 38th promotion examination, the KTA introduced separate tests for children. In February 1973, the Kukkiwon hosted the first official examination exclusively for children, after which examinations for practitioners under the age of 15 were conducted on a monthly basis. The Taegeuk poomsae were incorporated into promotion examinations in 1975. From 1 March 1983, Dan ranks awarded to practitioners under 15 years of age were officially designated as Poom, while the 4th Poom (the highest Poom level) was introduced only in 1999 following a revision of the regulations.

== See also ==
- Korean martial arts
- Kwans
- Kukkiwon
- Taekwondo

== Notes ==
a. S. H. Park (1993, p. 248) lists the KTA's founding committee in 1959: "As announced in Dong-A Newspaper; President, Gen. Choi Hong Hi, Vice President, Mr. No Byung Jik, Mr. Yun Kae Byung. Secretary General, Hwang Ki. Standing Directors; Mr. Hyun Jong Myung, Mr. Lee Nam Suk, Mr. Lee Jong Woo, Mr. Ko Jae Chun and Mr. Lee Young Suk. Directors; Mr. Um Un Kyu, Mr. Chong Chang Young, Mr. Bae Young Ki and Mr. Nam Tae Hi. Auditors, Mr. Kim Soon Bae and Mr. Cho Byoung Shi."

b. The claim that the KTA was founded in 1961 might be an attempt to dissociate the organisation from H. H. Choi (its inaugural president) due to later political differences between Choi and the South Korean government.

c. People claiming dan ranks from the KTA include: I. Ahmed, 1st dan (1969), 2nd dan (1970); J. R. Hilland (dan rank and year unspecified); K.-S. Hong, 5th dan (year unspecified); E. A. Humesky, 1st dan (1968), 2nd dan (1970), 3rd dan (1972); C. D. Jung, 7th dan (year unspecified); K. W. Kim, 9th dan (1971); S. Kim, 6th dan (1967), 7th dan (1973), 8th dan (1979); Y. B. Kong, 9th dan (2005); S. S. Lee, 9th dan Jidokwan (1993); Y. S. Lee (dan rank and year unspecified); W. C. Park, 4th dan (1963), 5th dan (1966); T. Walsh, 2nd dan (1971); and Y. K. Yoon, 6th dan (1999).
