= Taegeuk Sa Jang =

Fourth taekwondo form

Taegek Sa Jang (also romanized as Taegeuk Sah Jang) is the fourth of eight taekwondo forms practiced by the Kukkiwon and World Taekwondo. A form, or poomsae (also romanized as pumsae or poomse), is a choreographed pattern of defense-and-attack motions. Taegeuk Sa Jang is often (but not universally) practiced by students of Kukkiwon/WT-style taekwondo.

== Etymology ==
The taegeuk symbol

The word taegeuk (Korean: 태극; Hanja: 太極, Korean pronunciation: [tʰɛgɯk̚]) refers to the universe from which all things and values are derived. It is also the symbol that makes up the center of the flag of South Korea and the source for its name, taegeukgi (hangul: 태극기, where gi means "flag"). The taegeuk is commonly associated with Korean Taoism philosophical values as well as Korean shamanism.

The word sa is the number 4 in the Sino-Korean numbering system. The word jang translates roughly as "chapter" or "part". Taegeuk Sa Jang translates as "Part 4 of the Taegeuk".

== Symbolism ==
The floor pattern (or yeon-mu) of each taegeuk poomsae is three parallel lines. On each line, a 180 degree turn is performed.

- If the turn is performed by pivoting in-place, the line is considered to be a broken line.
- If the turn is performed by moving the lead foot to the rear, the line is considered to be a solid line.

The floor pattern of each taegeuk poomsae then represents three broken or solid lines, called trigrams or gwae (bagua in Chinese). Each trigram (gwae) corresponds to a natural element.

The Pal Gwae or 八卦 Bāguà—The eight trigrams
乾 Qián ☰	兌 Duì ☱	離 Lí ☲	震 Zhèn ☳	巽 Xùn ☴	坎 Kǎn ☵	艮 Gèn ☶	坤 Kūn ☷
Heaven/Sky	Lake/Marsh	Fire	Thunder	Wind	Water	Mountain	Earth
天 Tiān	澤(泽) Zé	火 Huǒ	雷 Léi	風(风) Fēng	水 Shuǐ	山 Shān	地 Dì
Gun	Tae	Yi	Jin	Seon	Gam	Gan	Gon

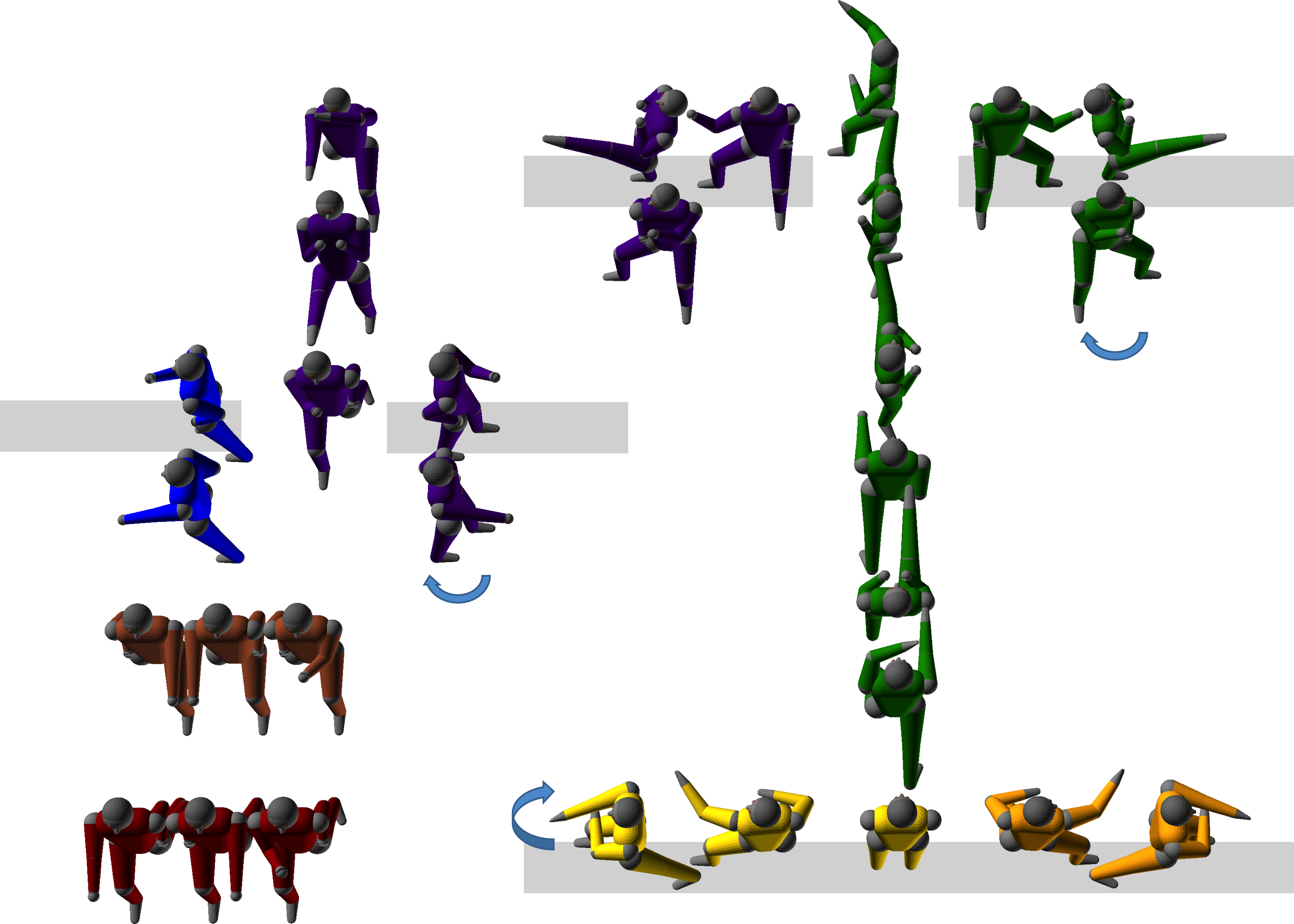
The first turn of Taegeuk Sa Jang is performed by moving the lead foot. The final two turns are performed by pivoting in-place. This indicates that the associated trigram is a solid line, a broken line, and a broken line.

The first turn of Taegeuk Sa Jang is performed by moving the lead foot. The final two turns are performed by pivoting in-place. This indicates that the associated trigram is a solid line, a broken line, and a broken line; this is the trigram for thunder ("jin"). The Kukkiwon teaches that this poomsae should be performed with majesty, like a thunderstorm. This is the first poomsae in the Taegeuk series in which the practitioner transitions from the first line directly to the third line via a continuous sequence of movements, further symbolizing the long-reach of a thunderstorm.

== Techniques ==
As a poomsae of intermediate difficulty, this form introduces the student to a number of new techniques:

- The form begins by introducing the double knifehand block, also called an augmented outside knifehand block. This technique is a staple of subsequent Taegeuk poomsae.
- The spearhead thrust, the side kick, and the swallowform strike (a simultaneous knifehand high block and knifehand neck strike) are also introduced in this form.
- Most notably, this poomsae places an increased emphasis on the advanced technique of "chambering" for the next movement while still performing the previous movement. In this context, the word chamber means to position one's arms and legs in preparation for an upcoming movement. As an example, when performing the final of two side kicks, the practitioner must chamber for a double knifehand block while still in the process of completing the kick.

== Development ==
During the 1920s and 1930s many of the pioneers of taekwondo studied karate or Chinese martial arts in which forms practice is seen as an essential element of the martial art. When these pioneers returned to Korea after the Japanese occupation, they incorporated forms practice into their teaching. During the 1960s there were several efforts among these pioneers to unify their styles of martial art and create a consolidated set of forms. In 1965 the Korea Taekwondo Association appointed a committee of representatives from six of the Nine Kwans to develop the forms for what is now called Kukkiwon- or WTF-style taekwondo. The committee consisted of:

- Young Sup Lee of the Song Moo Kwan
- Kyo Yoon Lee of the Han Moo Kwan
- Hae Man Park of the Chung Do Kwan
- Jong Myun Hyun of the Oh Do Kwan
- Soon Bae Kim of the Chang Moo Kwan

In 1967, this committee introduced the Palgwae and Yudanja (Black Belt) forms (including a simpler version of Koryo). In 1971 two additional kwans joined the committee:

- Chong Woo Lee of Jidokwan
- Young Ki Bae also of Jidokwan
- Young Tae Han of Moo Duk Kwan

This expanded committee went on to develop the Taegeuk forms.

== See also ==
- Taegeuk (taekwondo)
- Taekwondo forms
- Karate kata
- List of Taekwondo Techniques
