= Taegeuk Oh Jang =

Fifth taekwondo form

Taegeuk Oh Jang is the fifth of eight taekwondo forms in the Taegeuk set practiced by the Kukkiwon and World Taekwondo. A form, or poomsae (also romanized as pumsae or poomse), is a choreographed pattern of defense-and-attack motions. Taegeuk Oh Jang is often (but not universally) practiced by students of Kukkiwon/WT-style taekwondo with rank of 4th geup. Fourth geup students of Kukkiwon/WTF-style taekwondo practice this form in order to advance to the next rank (3rd geup).

== Etymology ==
The taegeuk symbol

The word taegeuk (Korean: 태극; Hanja: 太極, Korean pronunciation: [tʰɛgɯk̚]) refers to the universe from which all things and values are derived. It is also the symbol that makes up the center of the flag of South Korea and the source for its name, taegeukgi (hangul: 태극기, where gi means "flag"). The taegeuk is commonly associated with Korean Taoism philosophical values as well as Korean shamanism.

The word oh is the number 5 in the Sino-Korean numbering system. The word jang translates roughly as "chapter" or "part". Taegeuk Oh Jang translates as "Part 5 of the Taegeuk".

== Symbolism ==
The floor pattern (or yeon-mu) of each taegeuk poomsae is three parallel lines. On each line, a 180 degree turn is performed.

- If the turn is performed by pivoting in-place, the line is considered to be a broken line.
- If the turn is performed by moving the lead foot to the rear, the line is considered to be a solid line.

The floor pattern of each taegeuk poomsae then represents three broken or solid lines, called trigrams or gwae (bagua in Chinese). Each trigram (gwae) corresponds to a natural element.

The Pal Gwae or 八卦 Bāguà—The eight trigrams
乾 Qián ☰	兌 Duì ☱	離 Lí ☲	震 Zhèn ☳	巽 Xùn ☴	坎 Kǎn ☵	艮 Gèn ☶	坤 Kūn ☷
Heaven/Sky	Lake/Marsh	Fire	Thunder	Wind	Water	Mountain	Earth
天 Tiān	澤(泽) Zé	火 Huǒ	雷 Léi	風(风) Fēng	水 Shuǐ	山 Shān	地 Dì
Gun	Tae	Yi	Jin	Seon	Gam	Gan	Gon

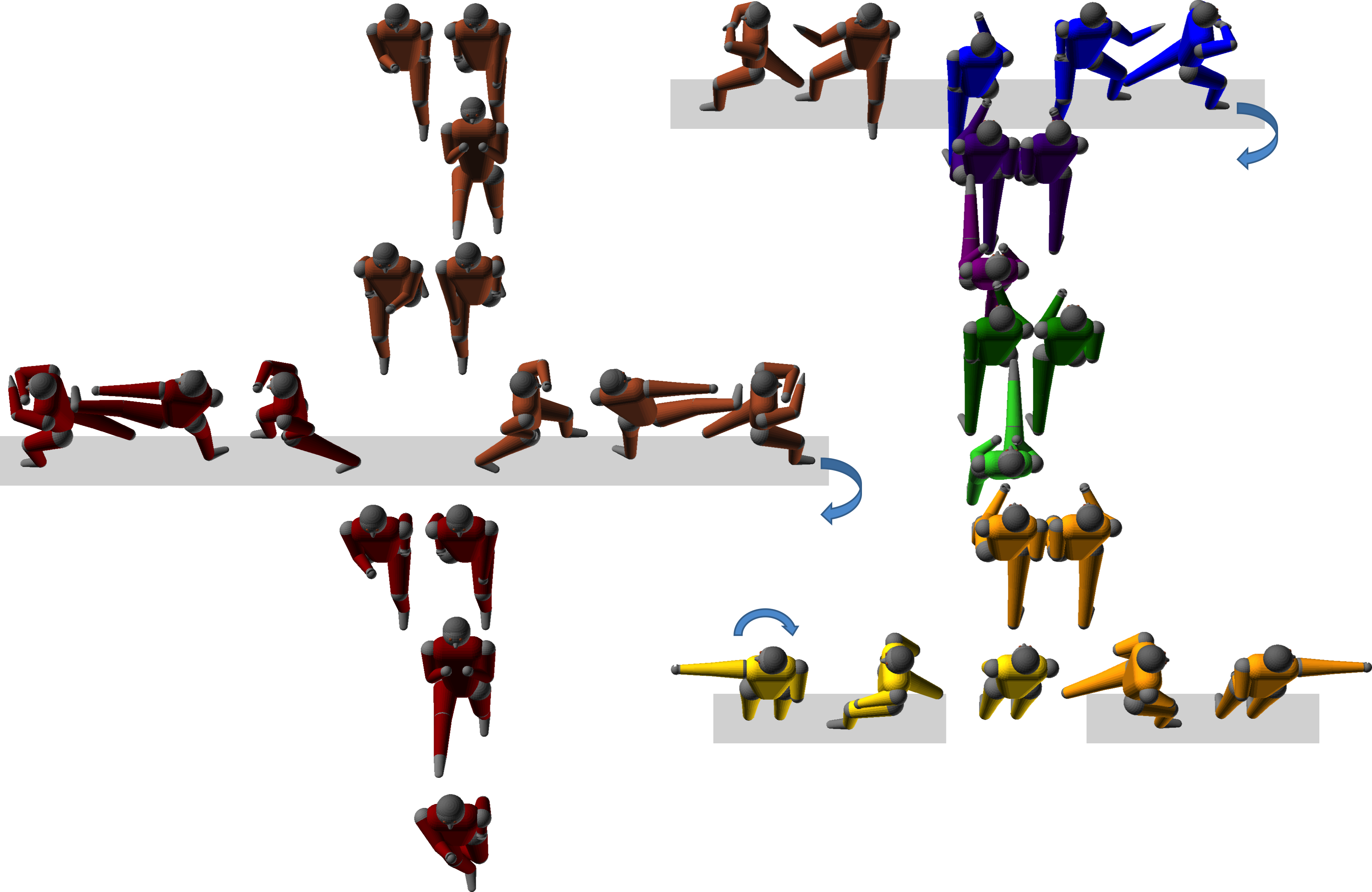
The first turn of Taegeuk Oh Jang is performed by pivoting in-place. The final two turns are performed by moving the lead foot. This indicates that the associated trigram is a broken line, a solid line, and a solid line.

The first turn of Taegeuk Oh Jang is performed by pivoting in-place. The final two turns are performed by moving the lead foot. This indicates that the associated trigram is a broken line, a solid line, and a solid line; this is the trigram for wind ("seon"). The Kukkiwon teaches that this poomsae should be performed with movements that are gentle but unyielding (like the wind).

== Techniques ==
As a poomsae of intermediate difficulty, this form introduces the student to a number of new techniques:

- One focus of this form is the introduction of elbow strikes of various types. Along the top line, chin-height elbow strikes are assisted by a supporting hand. Along the middle line, the off-hand is used as a target for elbow strikes at solar-plexus height.
- The side kicks along the middle line are augmented with a simultaneous hand strike. Some schools teach that this strike is a punch, other schools teach that this strike is a horizontal hammerfist, yet other schools teach that the extended arm symbolizes grabbing the opponent and preparing to pull him in to the elbow strike that follows next.

== Development ==
During the 1920s and 1930s many of the pioneers of taekwondo studied karate or Chinese martial arts in which forms practice is seen as an essential element of the martial art. When these pioneers returned to Korea after the Japanese occupation, they incorporated forms practice into their teaching. During the 1960s there were several efforts among these pioneers to unify their styles of martial art and create a consolidated set of forms. In 1965 the Korea Taekwondo Association appointed a committee of representatives from six of the Nine Kwans to develop the forms for what is now called Kukkiwon- or WTF-style taekwondo. The committee consisted of:

- Young Sup Lee of the Song Moo Kwan
- Kyo Yoon Lee of the Han Moo Kwan
- Hae Man Park of the Chung Do Kwan
- Jong Myun Hyun of the Oh Do Kwan
- Soon Bae Kim of the Chang Moo Kwan

In 1967, this committee introduced the Palgwae and Yudanja (Black Belt) forms (including a simpler version of Koryo). In 1971 two additional kwans joined the committee:

- Chong Woo Lee of Jidokwan
- Young Ki Bae also of Jidokwan
- Young Tae Han of Moo Duk Kwan

This expanded committee went on to develop the Taegeuk forms.

== See also ==
- Taegeuk (taekwondo)
- Taekwondo forms
- Karate kata
- List of Taekwondo Techniques
