= Taegeuk Chil Jang =

Seventh taekwondo form

Taegeuk Chil Jang is the seventh of eight taekwondo forms practiced by the Kukkiwon and the World Taekwondo Federation. A form, or poomsae (also romanized as pumsae or poomse), is a choreographed pattern of defense-and-attack motions. Taegeuk Chil Jang is often (but not universally) practiced by students of Kukkiwon/WTF-style taekwondo with rank of 2nd geup. Second geup students of Kukkiwon/WTF-style taekwondo practice this form in order to advance to the next rank (1st geup).

== Etymology ==
The taegeuk symbol

The word taegeuk (Korean: 태극; Hanja: 太極, Korean pronunciation: [tʰɛgɯk̚]) refers to the universe from which all things and values are derived. It is also the symbol that makes up the center of the flag of South Korea and the source for its name, taegeukgi (hangul: 태극기, where gi means "flag"). The taegeuk is commonly associated with Korean Taoism philosophical values as well as Korean shamanism.

The word chil is the number 7 in the Sino-Korean numbering system. The word jang translates roughly as "chapter" or "part". Taegeuk Chil Jang translates as "Part 7 of the Taegeuk".

== Symbolism ==
The floor pattern (or yeon-mu) of each taegeuk poomsae is three parallel lines. On each line, a 180 degree turn is performed.

- If the turn is performed by pivoting in-place, the line is considered to be a broken line.
- If the turn is performed by moving the lead foot to the rear, the line is considered to be a solid line.

The floor pattern of each taegeuk poomsae then represents three broken or solid lines, called trigrams or gwae (bagua in Chinese). Each trigram (gwae) corresponds to a natural element.

The Pal Gwae or 八卦 Bāguà—The eight trigrams
乾 Qián ☰	兌 Duì ☱	離 Lí ☲	震 Zhèn ☳	巽 Xùn ☴	坎 Kǎn ☵	艮 Gèn ☶	坤 Kūn ☷
Heaven/Sky	Lake/Marsh	Fire	Thunder	Wind	Water	Mountain	Earth
天 Tiān	澤(泽) Zé	火 Huǒ	雷 Léi	風(风) Fēng	水 Shuǐ	山 Shān	地 Dì
Gun	Tae	Yi	Jin	Seon	Gam	Gan	Gon

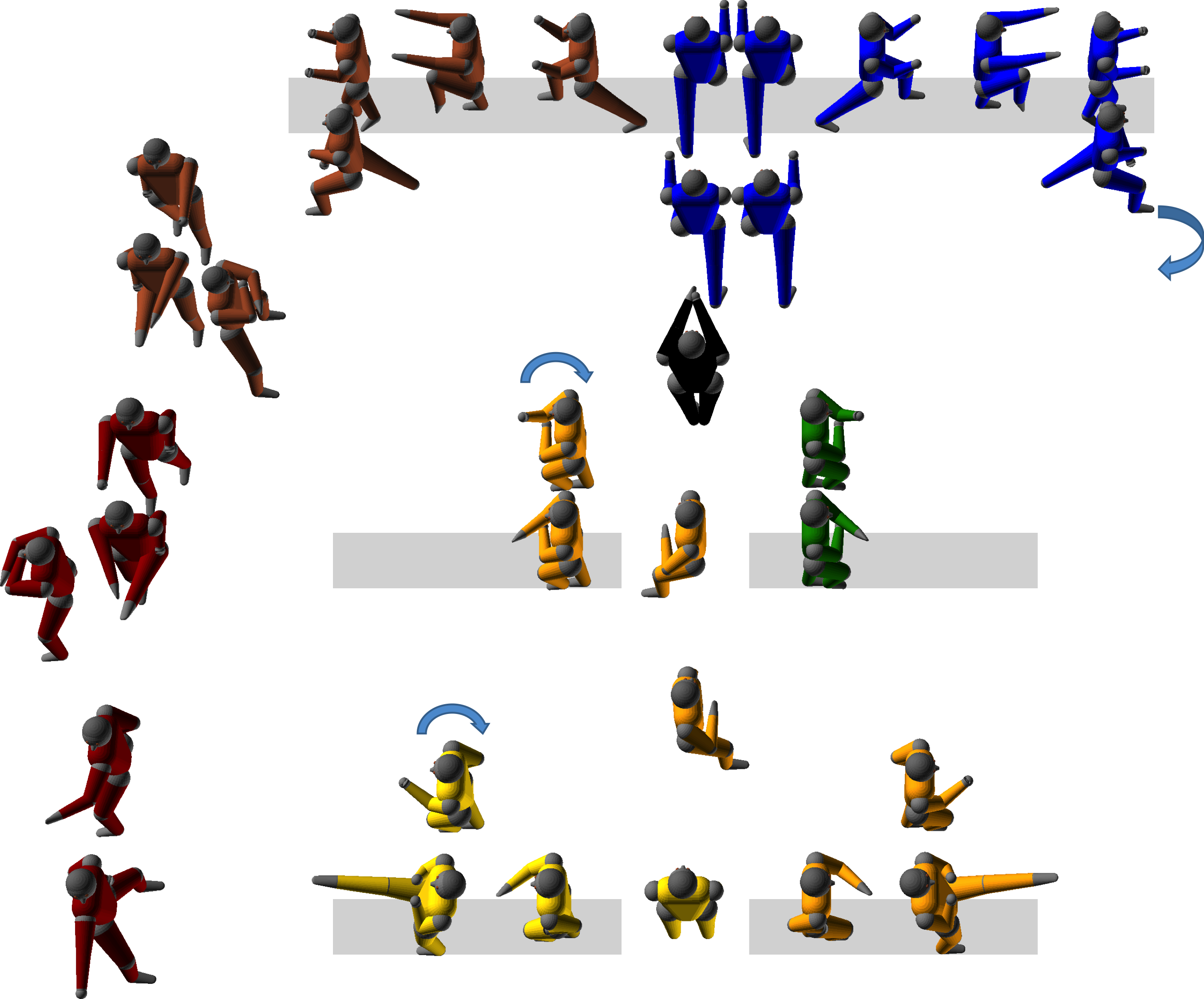
The first two turns of Taegeuk Chil Jang are performed by pivoting in-place. The final turn is performed by moving the lead foot. This indicates that the associated trigram is a broken line, a broken line, and a solid line.

The first two turns of Taegeuk Chil Jang are performed by pivoting in-place. The final turn is performed by moving the lead foot. This indicates that the associated trigram is a broken line, a broken line, and a solid line; this is the trigram for mountain ("gan"). The Kukkiwon teaches that this poomsae should be performed with movements that are unyielding and immovable (like a mountain).

== Techniques ==
As an advanced poomsae, this form introduces the student to a large number of new techniques:

- This form begins with a tiger stance. In Korean culture, tigers are associated with life in the mountains; the prominence of the tiger stance in this form is an example of the "mountain" motif being represented in the form's movements.
- Low double knifehand block (also called low augmented knifehand block)
- A palm block and a backfist strike, both performed on a supporting arm
- A scissors block (i.e., simultaneous low block and outside block)
- Shoulder-height opening block
- Strike to the abdomen using the knee
- A hinge-block chamber leading up to a low cross block. This is the first block seen in the Taegeuk poomsae that is not a "deflecting" block. In other words, this block traps an attack rather than deflecting it; this is an example of an "unyielding/immovable" movement in this form.
- Target kick

== Development ==
During the 1920s and 1930s many of the pioneers of taekwondo studied karate or Chinese martial arts in which forms practice is seen as an essential element of the martial art. When these pioneers returned to Korea after the Japanese occupation, they incorporated forms practice into their teaching. During the 1960s there were several efforts among these pioneers to unify their styles of martial art and create a consolidated set of forms. In 1965 the Korea Taekwondo Association appointed a committee of representatives from six of the Nine Kwans to develop the forms for what is now called Kukkiwon- or WTF-style taekwondo. The committee consisted of:

- Young Sup Lee of the Song Moo Kwan
- Kyo Yoon Lee of the Han Moo Kwan
- Hae Man Park of the Chung Do Kwan
- Jong Myun Hyun of the Oh Do Kwan
- Soon Bae Kim of the Chang Moo Kwan

In 1967, this committee introduced the Palgwae and Yudanja (Black Belt) forms (including a simpler version of Koryo). In 1971 two additional kwans joined the committee:

- Chong Woo Lee of Jidokwan
- Young Ki Bae also of Jidokwan
- Young Tae Han of Moo Duk Kwan

This expanded committee went on to develop the Taegeuk forms.

== See also ==
- Taegeuk (taekwondo)
- Taekwondo forms
- Karate kata
- List of Taekwondo Techniques
