= List of taekwondo techniques =

Taekwondo techniques vary between most schools and level and not all techniques are included. Techniques often combined into shorter set (Hyeong), but these vary from school to school.

== Hand attacks ==
Taekwondo hand strikes are as a close distance alternative to kicks. They are executed in a number of ways from standing, jumping, spinning and rushing forwards. Hand strikes make up fast combinations of strikes which can leave an opponent stunned and unable to defend himself. Taekwondo hand strikes can be separated into two distinct styles:

- Closed hand strikes (jireugi)
- Open hand techniques (chigi)

Various surfaces of the hand may be engaged as the striking surface depending on which area of the opponents body which is being targeted. This leads to a large array of hand positions.

- Forefist - A closed fist may be jabbed out directly to strike with the forefist knuckles. This is a suitable position for general punches to soft areas of the body. Without protection, it is inadvisable to strike the bony face as fingers are likely to get broken on the hard temple and jaw bones.
- Hammer fist - A closed fist may be brought down in a hammering motion to strike with the underneath. Such a strike can obliterate an opponent's nose, making it nearly impossible for them to retaliate.
- Backfist - A Son Deung clenched hand is swung backwards into the face of an opponent. The back of the hand makes contact and the momentum garnered in the swing makes this a powerful strike. Spinning backfists are a knockout punch and banned in most Taekwondo competitions.
- Flying Punch - struck usually from the rear hand, the combatant hops on the front foot, kicking back with the rear foot and simultaneously extending the rear hand as a punch, in the form of "superman" flying through the sky.
- Knifehand - 'Sonkal' is the Taekwondo name for a move similar to the "karate chop", i.e. where an open hand is hammered down to make impact with the underside. A ridgehand is the opposite, where the top of the open hand strikes. These are commonly made to the side of the neck.
- Fingertips - Jumeok can be used to strike vulnerable areas of the body such as pressure points. Four finger strikes engaging the tips of the outstretched hand (known as a spearhand) can be made to vital points in the neck.
- Thumb - Eomji is a fist with the thumb protruding over the top. This is a formidable weapon in pressure point striking. Vulnerable areas can be targeted all over the body such as the sternum, the spaces in between the ribs and other nerve clusters.
- Palm heel - a classic self-defense strike where the hand is pulled back to engage the base of the palm in an upwards thrusting strike. This is particularly dangerous if applied to the base of the nose or chin and can result in death. This strike is banned in competition Taekwondo.
- Elbow strike (palgup chigi)- The forearm is folded inwards towards the body and the strike is delivered with the outside of the forearm or elbow while stepping forwards. Taekwondo also makes use of reverse and front elbow strikes.
- Four-knuckle strike - This is a fist shape particular to Asian martial arts. Instead of closing the fist completely, the fingers are held out and only the knuckles are bent, thereby presenting the upper set of knuckles as the striking surface. This fist is used for breaking boards as the smaller surface area concentrates the punches power. In self-defense, it may be used to purposefully break an attacker's jaw.
- Eagle strike - In this strike, the fingers all touch together, and the hand is pointed down, exposing the top of the wrist, which is then swung upward to strike the underside of the jaw. If done properly, this strike can easily fracture the jawbone, and is usually banned from competitions due to the extreme danger. If done improperly, however, the practitioner may break his wrist.
- Tiger claw - A strike using the space between the index finger and thumb. Fingers are made rigid, and the attack is usually directed towards the neck/trachea. Serves as a way to incapacitate an opponent for a few seconds.
- Pincer hand - A strike which uses thumb and forefinger to strike an opponent's throat. In this technique, a fist is closed except thumb and forefinger, which are fully extended outwards.
- Scissor finger - A fist in which forefinger and middle finger is extended out as if to dig someone's eye. Similar to Pincer hand, except that the forefinger and middle finger are extended outwards.
- Chestnut fist - Similar to normal fist, except that the first three knuckles are pushed outward slightly with the thumb.

== Kick (Chagi) ==
All kicks can be executed as jump kicks, spin kicks, jump spin kicks or multi-rotational spin kicks. Also, all can be performed by the front or rear leg in a given stance.

Some of the best-known Taekwondo kicks include:

- Front Kick (앞 차기 ap chagi): This is a very linear kick. The practitioner raises the knee to the waist, pulls the toes back and quickly extends the foot at the target. It is also known as the snap kick. The front kick is one of the first kicks learned in taekwondo; if mastered it can become one of the most powerful. This technique is more meant to be used to push the attacker away, but can injure the opponent as well.
- Side kick (옆 차기 yeop chagi): A very powerful kick, in which the practitioner simultaneously raises the knee and rotates the body 90 degrees, while extending their leg. In WT style taekwondo, this technique should strike with the outside edge of the foot, although using the heel may provide more force if used in sparring.
- Roundhouse kick (돌려 차기 dollyeo chagi): The practitioner raises the knee, turns the hips, pivots on the non-kicking foot, and snaps the kick horizontally into the target at an 80 to 90-degree angle, either with the instep or with the ball of the foot with the toes pulled back.
- Back kick (뒷 차기 dwit chagi): The practitioner turns the body away from the target and pushes the back leg straight toward the target, hitting it with the heel while watching over the shoulder. The turning motion helps to give this kick a lot of power. Without proper care, you can "spin out" and lose your balance from using this attack.
- Reverse side kick (반대 옆 차기 bandae yeop chagi): This kick is similar to the back kick, except the body turns further, allowing the heel to hit the target with the foot pointing to the side as in a regular side kick, instead of downward as in a true back kick.
- Hook kick (후려 차기 huryeo chagi): A less popular kick traditionally, however it has found increasing favor in modern competitions. The practitioner raises the knee in a fashion similar to the roundhouse kick, then extends the foot outward then snaps it around in a dorsal arc, with the heel as the intended striking weapon.
- Axe kick (내려 차기 naeryeo chagi): Another kick that has increased in popularity due to sparring competitions. The leg is raised usually from the outside of the body like an outside crescent kick. then the leg is pulled down with the heel pointed downward. It is typically targeted toward the head, shoulder, or chest and requires significant flexibility to employ effectively. This kick is best used against the collar bone, which can readily break from this attack. the setup in the initial raise of the kick can also be done from the inside, or middle (straight up and down.)
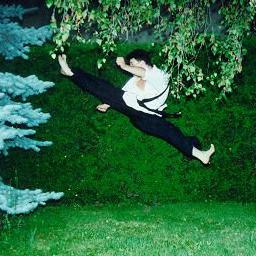
  Jump Spin Kick
- Crescent kick (an chagi/bakkat chagi): There are two variations of this kick: the outer crescent and the inner crescent. In the outer, the practitioner raises the extended leg as high as possible, and slightly up across the body, (a bit across the centerline of the body), then sweeping outward to the side, in a circular movement. In the inner, the motions are the same but the direction of the kick changes, this time originating from the outside of the body, heading towards the inside, or centerline of the body. These kicks are also called "inside crescent kick" and "outside crescent kick" at some taekwondo schools.
- Reverse Turning Kick (반대 돌려 차기 bandae dollyeo chagi): This kick may appear similar to a hook kick, but is performed with a straight leg, and usually at least a half-rotation. The heel connects with the target.
- Spin kicks There are several spinning kicks that involve the rotation of the entire body and head before the kick is released. Spinning kicks include the back pivot kick (dweel chagi), spinning hook kick (dweel huryeo chagi), spinning axe kick, returning kick, 360 turning kick, and a number of other kicks of varying popularity.
- Fly Kick (on mondollyo chagi):The practitioner steps forward and spins in the direction of their back leg while raising their knee and jumping to perform a spinning inside crescent kick in midair.
- Jump Kicks (뛰어 차기 ttwieo chagi):

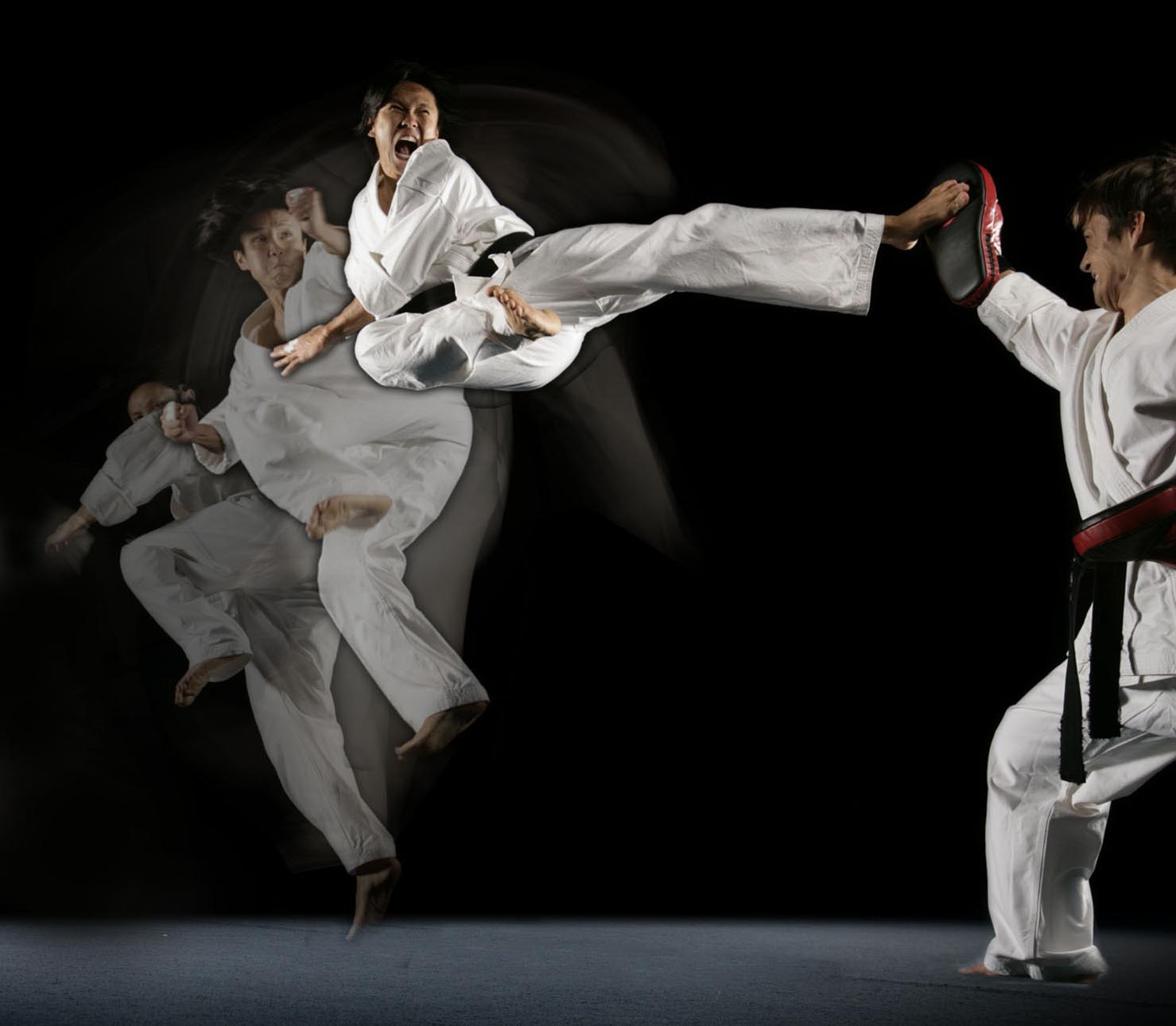
Steven Ho: Jump Spin Hook Kick

There are also many kicks that involve jumping before their execution. These include the jumping front kick (ee dan ap chagi), jumping side kick (이단 옆 차기 idan yeop chagi), flying side kick, jumping axe kick, jumping roundhouse (ee dan dollyeo chagi), jumping spinning hook kick, jumping spinning roundhouse kick, jumping back kick, and jump spinning side kick. Normally, jumping kicks involve pulling up the back leg to help gain height during the jump and then performing the kick itself with the front leg.

- Advanced kicks: There are a variety of kicks that can be used in combination or stem out from a simple kick to create more difficult ones. Some of these include 540 Kick (One spins 1½ times in mid-air and does a kick, usually a back spinning hook kick), a 720 Kick (the practitioner spins 2 times in mid-air and performs a kick, usually a back spinning hook kick), and Triple Aero Kicks (Practitioner performs round house kick, back spinning hook kick, and another round house kick in mid-air).
- Fast Kicks: Also, many kicks can be employed using a fast kick style. The practitioner shuffles the back leg forward to the front leg, and the front leg comes up and kicks closer to the enemy than the practitioner had been before execution. This can be used with side kick, roundhouse kick, front kick, hook kick, and axe kick.
- Monkey Kick: This is an awkward, ineffectual kick that is just barely impactful enough to cause hogu that are rigged for electronic scoring to register a point, especially in WT (formerly WTF) - style sparring. It is often cited as an example of how the practice electronic scoring harms sport Taekwondo. Electronic hogu have embedded sensors that detect the vibration from a blow. In principle, the idea is that a legitimate taekwondo kick (such as a roundhouse kick) will impact the hogu and cause the sensors to vibrate—thus scoring a point. Because there is no guarantee that the legitimate kick will impact directly on the sensor, the sensors need to be calibrated to detect even "light" impacts. This kick takes advantage of this light calibration by allowing the competitor to score a point with a simple, awkward tap of the foot on the hogu, as long as the impact occurs near a sensor. In the case of a Monkey Kick specifically, this light impact is accomplished by tapping the bottom of the foot against the opponent's sensor while standing very close to the opponent.

After many complaints from different Member National Associations, the WT Technical Commission decided to sanction the athletes who used the technique in excess. The Commission also called all coaches from the participating countries for a meeting so the coaches could express their opinions about the technique and situation

- Lower Kick: This kick can disarm the opponent if done with a lot of force but if the opponent is on the guard the kick might not work.
- Twist Kick (비틀어차기 bituro chagi): This is a deceptive kick, in which the practitioner chambers a roundhouse kick, rotating the hips to strike one side, but then twists the lower leg in the opposite direction, hitting the opponent. The practitioner will strike with the ball of the foot or the instep, but can use the heel too.

== Blocks ==
Taekwondo blocks known as Makgi or Makki are used to stop and deflect an incoming attack. They engage various parts of the arm with the hand and are held in different positions such as knife-hand, closed fist etc. Each block is suitable for a particular kind of attack and may be combined with another punch or kick to make a counter-attack. Blocks often incorporate a pulling hand (Dang-Gineun Son or Danggi Son). This is a hand position held at the hip or solar plexus. Its purpose is to grab an opponent to disrupt their balance or posture, provide proprioceptive feedback (a sense of one's own body position) and to clear an opponent's limb to create an opening for an attack.

There are four main types of blocks:

- Striking blocks - Chyeo Makgi is a defensive technique designed to stop an incoming strike with direct, opposing force instead of redirecting it. The goal is to forcefully intercept the attack, potentially injuring the opponent's attacking limb. When a kick is used to perform this type of block, it is specifically classified as a Cha Makgi (차 막기).
- Parrying blocks - Geodeo Makgi is a method of evading a strike by guiding it away from its target. The principle is to redirect an attack's force instead of blocking it directly. Using an opponent's momentum against them by deflecting their strike.
- Absorbing blocks - Bada Makgi a defensive technique designed to reduce the impact of an opponent's strike by moving the body in the same direction as the attack. This method works to absorb and alleviate the force of the incoming blow rather than meeting it head-on with a hard block.
- Tripping blocks - Georeo Makgi is a block that intercepts a kick and uses the opponent's leg to throw them off balance or to the ground. This technique blocks a kick and immediately follows by lifting the leg to unbalance or trip the opponent. A defensive move that catches a kick and sweeps the supporting leg to trip the attacker.

There are also three main levels of blocking:

- Low blocks - Arae Makgi
- Middle blocks - Momtong Makgi
- High blocks - Eolgul (also spelled Ulgul, Olgul or Ulgool) Makgi

Taekwondo blocks occur in the four basic directions:

- Downward Block - Naeryeo Makgi or Arae Makgi is a fundamental blocking technique. Its primary purpose is to defend against attacks aimed at the midsection, specifically anywhere between the chest and the groin. It is not intended for blocking attacks to the legs. The blocking arm is chambered with the fist (pinky side) positioned over the collar bone. The arm then swings down across the body in a snapping motion. The block finishes with the arm stopping just above the knee, palm facing down, deflecting the attack away. The motion can also be applied for striking the groin, sweeping an opponent, grip stripping, applying a neck crank and clearing an opponent's limb.
- Upward Block - Ollyeo Makgi or Eolgul (also spelled Ulgul, Olgul or Ulgool) Makgi is a fundamental upper block in Taekwondo designed to defend against high-level attacks. The blocking arm is chambered with the fist (pinky side) starting across the body at the belt or hip. The arm then rises past the face, finishing above and in front of the head. The palm faces upward at the completion of the block. Its core function is to block high attacks, such as used with body leaning to defend against an axe kick or a front kick to the face. In open sparring, the edge of the elbow can be used to block punches to the face. It can also be used offensively to press the forearm into an aggressor's throat while controlling their arm. This is an essential beginner block taught in the first few lessons of Taekwondo.
- Inward Block - An Makgi is a fundamental blocking technique where the defender's arm swings from the outside of the body (near the ear) inward across the center line to deflect an attack. The fist (palm facing forward) is lifted to the side of the body at ear level and then swings in a chopping motion across the front of the body. The arm stops vertically in front of the center line with the palm facing the defender. For poomsae, the elbow should be bent at an angle of approximately 120 degrees. It is performed by stepping forward, using the inner side of the forearm to absorb the force of an incoming attack.
- Outward Block - Bakkat Makgi or Bakkan Makgi is a fundamental blocking technique where the outside (thumb-side) of the forearm is used to deflect an attack from the inside to the outside of the defender's body. The blocking arm (chambered fist on the hip) swings across the body in a horizontal arc, stopping in front of the centerline. The outer forearm is used to block. It is commonly performed from a walking stance. The arm snaps forward into a horizontal frame with the elbow bent at approximately 120 degrees. The palm faces the defender. It is used to defend against high, middle, or low-level attacks. Beyond simply blocking a strike, the technique's motion can be applied as a frame against an opponent's neck while pulling their arm down with the other hand, a forearm strike to an opponent's neck, an outward parry, often preceded by an inward parry with the other hand.

Body part or hand position of blocks:

- Single Forearm Block - Wae Sun Palmok is used to deflect an attack (usually a kick) made at the torso. Starting up near the opposite shoulder, and the leading hand is projected down and across the body to deflect the kick with the forearm.
- Palm Block - Sonbadak Naeryo Makgi is a standard block used to deflect incoming kicks and punches. The open hand is raised up to shoulder height and thrust directly down to meet the attackers limb. The heel of the hand makes contact with the attacker's forearm in case of a punch, or shin in case of a kick. Although simple, it requires a lot of partner training to get the timing of this Taekwondo block correct.
- Knife Hand Block - Sonnal Makgi is when the hand is kept in a knife hand position to block attacks to the torso. As the front arms sweeps down in an arc from the inside to the outside of the body, the back hand is simultaneously pulled back to the back hip and ready for a counter punch.
- Double Forearm Block - Doo Palmok Makgi is a more advanced Taekwondo block, designed to be used against a strong attack to the center of the body. Standing sideways, the lead forearm blocks the attack with the fist closed. The second arm provides further support, linking into the crook of the arm so both forearms are at a 90-degree angle to the body.
- Double Knife Hand Block - With the hands held open in the knife hand position, a powerful kick aimed at the solar plexus can be successfully blocked. Both hands come across the body, intersecting at the forearms and providing a firm defence.

Additional blocks:

- Low Block - Najundi Makgi is used to defend against low attacks to the torso or legs. This is one of the most basic Taekwondo blocks and one of the first things a beginner will learn. The lead forearm is bent and raised to shoulder height, snapping the arm down straight with the palm facing the ground, which blocks any incoming low kicks.
- Rising Block - Chookya Makgi is another basic Taekwondo block, used to defend against overhead attacks to the head and shoulders. The arm is bent and raised above the head, and the underside of the forearm absorbs the impact of the blow, which may be painful but is better than it connecting with your head or delicate clavicle. This block is used to defend against Hammerfists, Axe Kicks and overhead strikes with blunt instruments.
- Nine Block - Gutja Makgi is a black belt-level block and the first time it is usually used is around the black belt form. The person blocks their chest with one hand and stomach region with the other. The shape of the block forms a number nine when executed correctly. Both arms are bent at a 45-degree angle as well and it leaves little space open in the mid region of the defender's body. Your hand when this move is executed correctly should also be above your groin on the bottom and next to you opposite shoulder with the top hand.

== Patterns, poomsae, hyung, tul ==
Taekwondo patterns, also known as poomsae, teul, or hyeong constitute an important part of Taekwondo competitions. A pattern is a series of movements linked together in a prescribed sequence. Both basic and advanced taekwondo techniques can be contained within a single patterns and the higher the level of the competitor, the greater the difficulty of the techniques and the complexity of the pattern. Competitors must perform their highest pattern in front of a panel of judges.

There are three types of Taekwondo pattern competition:

- Team Taekwondo patterns - Performed simultaneously by several competitors from a club organised into a single team. Club teams compete by performing two patterns each, one after the other. Once one team have finished both their patterns can the competing team then perform theirs. Again, the judges choose the best pattern to go through to the next round.

In taekwondo tournaments, pattern competitions are generally graded on:

- Realism. Taekwondo patterns are the learning ground for real combat. As such, every technique must display the requisite speed, power and firmness to be realistically used as an attack or defines move.
- Spirit. A competitor's 'presence' on the mat must be as credible as his technique. Self belief, confidence in abilities, and intention to perform to a personal best are tangible virtues considered indispensable in Taekwondo practitioners.
- Decorum. Proper manners must be displayed when interacting with the judges directly before and after the pattern. Respect must also be extended to rival competitors, clubs and other officials.
- Form. General qualities that judges look for in any Taekwondo practitioner include proper breathing technique and body control. The diaphragm must be engaged in deep breathing, shallow breathing concentrated in the upper abdomen results in raised shoulders and stressed muscles. The muscles of the body should be lightly relaxed in order to perform the pattern with fluidity, speed and grace. Muscles should only be tensed at the moment of imaginary impact in order to commute maximum power to any individual Taekwondo technique.

ATA Songahm-style	ITF Chang Hon-style	GTF style	WT Kukkiwon-style	Jhoon Rhee style
	Beginner Exercises (3)	Beginner Exercises (3)	Unofficial Beginner Forms (usually 3–)	Beginner Forms (2)
	Four Direction Punch	Four Direction Punch	Kicho Hyeong Il Bu, Kibon Hana or Kibon Il Jang	Kam Sah
	Four Direction Block	Four Direction Block	Kicho Hyeong Ee Bu, Kibon Dool or Kibon Ee Jang	Kyu-Yool
	Four Direction Thrust	Four Direction Thrust	Kicho Hyeong Sam Bu, Kibon Set or Kibon Sam Jang	
			Kibon Net or Kibon Sa Jang	
Color Belt Forms (9)	Color Belt Forms (9)	Color Belt Forms (11)	Color Belt Forms (Taegeuk, 8)	Color Belt Forms (8)
Songahm 1	Chon-Ji	Chon-Ji	Taegeuk Il Jang	Jayoo
Songahm 2	Dan-Gun	Dan-Gun	Taegeuk Ee Jang	Chosang
Songahm 3	Do-San	Do-San	Taegeuk Sam Jang	Hangook
Songahm 4		Jee-Sang	Taegeuk Sa Jang	Jung-Yi
Songahm 5	Won-Hyo	Won-Hyo	Taegeuk Oh Jang	Pyung-Wa
In Wha 1	Yul-Gok	Yul-Gok	Taegeuk Yook Jang	Meegook
In Wha 2		Dhan-Goon	Taegeuk Chil Jang	Chasin
Choong Jung 1	Joong-Gun	Joong-Gun	Taegeuk Pal Jang	Might for Right
Choong Jung 2	Toi-Gye	Toi-Gye		
	Hwa-Rang	Hwa-Rang		
	Choong-Moo	Choong-Moo		
Black Belt Forms (8)	Black Belt Forms (15)	Black Belt Forms (19)	Black Belt Forms (9)	Black Belt Forms
Shim Jun	Kwang-Gae	Kwang-Gae	Koryo	Same as ITF
Jung Yul	Po-Eun	Po-Eun	Keumgang	
Chung San	Gae-Baek	Gae-Baek	Taebaek	
Sok Bong		Jee-Goo	Pyongwon	
Chung Hae	Eui-Am	Eui-Am	Sipjin	
Jhang Soo	Choong-Jang	Choong-Jang	Jitae	
Chul Joon	Juche, or Go-Dang*	Go-Dang	Cheonkwon	
Jeong Seung		Jook-Am	Hansoo	
	Sam-Il	Sam-Il	Ilyeo	
	Yoo-Sin	Yoo-Sin		
	Choi-Yong	Choi-Yong	Older Color Belt Forms (Palgwae, 8)	
		Pyong-Hwa	Palgwae Il Jang	
	Yon-Gae	Yon-Gae	Palgwae Ee Jang	
	Ul-Ji	Ul-Ji	Palgwae Sam Jang	
	Moon-Moo	Moon-Moo	Palgwae Sa Jang	
		Sun-Duk	Palgwae Oh Jang	
	So-San	So-San	Palgwae Yook Jang	
	Se-Jong	Se-Jong	Palgwae Chil Jang	
	Tong-Il	Tong-Il	Palgwae Pal Jang	
	Older Black Belt Forms		Older Black Belt Forms	
	* Go-Dang is considered deprecated in most ITF styles		Original Koryo	
	U-Nam is an ITF Chang-Hon form that appears only in the 1959 edition of Choi Hong-hi's Tae Kwon Do Teaching Manual			
			Candidate Demo Forms (2007, never officially finalized)	
			Hanryu	
			Bikkak	
			Kukkiwon Competition Poomsae (2016)	
			Himchari	
			Yamang	
			Saebyeol	
			Nareusya (called Bigak Sam Jang by WT)	
			Bigak (called Bigak Ee Jang by WT)	
			Eoullim	
			Saeara	
			Hansol	
			Narae	
			Onnuri	
			WT Competition Poomsae (2017)	
			Bigak Il Jang (developed by WT)	
			Bigak Ee Jang (based on Kukkiwon's Bigak)	
			Bigak Sam Jang (based on Kukkiwon's Nareusya)	

== Self defense ==
Taekwondo self-defense is known as kinuo and it forms one of the 20 main principles of the art. The self-defense applications would be difficult to score in sparring as they are designed primarily to cause injury or quickly incapacitate an adversary.

In competition, self-defense techniques take the format of a demonstration event, much like ponomoom. One person is usually designated the part of the Taekwondo practitioner, while several teammates take the role of common street aggressors who attack from various angles with punches, kicks and grabs common to street brawlers. Weapons may also be used, as Taekwondo has specific techniques for dealing with armed adversaries.

Taekwondo self-defense competition provides an opportunity for students to display their understanding of Taekwondo self-defense applications and the ability to put together their own team choreography. Self-defense routines are often performed as displays for the public, in which case there are no judges present. Many Taekwondo clubs include self-defense in their daily routine in both WTF and ITF.

There are two main concepts in Taekwondo self-defense. For real life combat situations, an experienced Taekwondo practitioner is versed in the following:

- Linear (or hard) techniques
- Circular (or soft) techniques

Linear Techniques

These include mostly punching, kicking, headbutts and other striking maneuvers. Force is countered with force and all limbs are involved in stopping an adversary. Taekwondo kicks have a wide reach that keeps the adversary at a distance. With proper execution opponents may be incapacitated with a single blow, which lessens the number of attacks in encounters with multiple people.

Circular techniques

These emphasize redirection and manipulation rather than strength. The adversary can be manipulated into a position whereby a lock, stranglehold and/or finishing move can be applied. Grappling techniques are used both as a means of securing an adversary and escaping from an adversary's grip. Soft self-defense techniques like the stranglehold or joint lock can be used to subdue the attacker, avoiding dealing permanent injury.

Taekwondo self-defense techniques demonstrated in competition may include:

- Pressure point applications. In Taekwondo philosophy, the body has many sensitive areas that are susceptible to precise attack. These are known as pressure points or ji ap sul. There are three types of pressure point that can induce one or a combination of the following: pain, paralysis, or death. These can be targeted with gripping and/or striking in order to immobilize or cause substantial pain to submit the opponent.
- Throws. Known as too sul, Taekwondo practitioners can divert the opponent's force to their own advantage and throw him to the ground. Once on the ground the practitioner has greater control over his adversary and can follow up with subsequent controlling or finishing techniques.
- Joint Locks. Otherwise known as kwan jyel sul in Taekwondo, these can be useful against armed attackers. Typically the attacking limb is grabbed and then manipulated to cause immense pain in the adversary. Joint locks can be applied on any joint in the body and are particularly useful for controlling an opponent who has been thrown to the ground.
- Termination techniques. These are a range of strikes applied to an opponent downed by a previous throw or strike. Powerful downward traveling kicks and hand strikes are used to make sure the opponent stays down.
- Choking techniques. In chil sik sul, the idea of applying a stranglehold is to deprive the attacker's brain of either oxygenated blood through the carotid artery and/or oxygen for the lungs through the trachea. The Taekwondo practitioner uses leverage from his arm and sometimes involves the attackers clothing in applying pressure to the sensitive neck area. Choke holds are particularly dangerous and only taught to higher level Taekwondo students, as over exertion can crush the trachea or cause sudden death.
- Freeing techniques. Paegi are taught to Taekwondo students so that they can quickly free themselves and neutralise the danger of being grabbed by an attacker. Competition demonstrations frequently involve one student grabbing another from behind. The science of Taekwondo is equally concerned with defense as attack so proper freeing techniques must be learnt.

Like other Taekwondo competition events, self-defense is marked by a panel of judges. When scoring they are looking at the following factors:

- Aliveness. How realistic is the Taekwondo students demonstration? Does he move with the requisite urgency and do his techniques have the emotional content to make the judges believe in their power?
- Technique. Are the Taekwondo techniques being demonstrated precisely? Are the kicks clean, fast and strong? Are joint locks and throws being performed accurately? Does the student have control over his adversaries or are they making it easy for him?
- Variety. What is the range of the Taekwondo practitioners knowledge? Is he showing his understanding of liner and direct counter-attacks? Has he performed a practical finishing technique after each throw or lock?
- Difficulty. More difficult Taekwondo techniques score higher than simple ones if performed correctly. However, a poorly executed technique will always score lower than a simple, effective technique performed well; students should not be demonstrating techniques that they have not mastered.
