= Mohammad Esmail Azarpad =

Iranian taekwondo practitioner

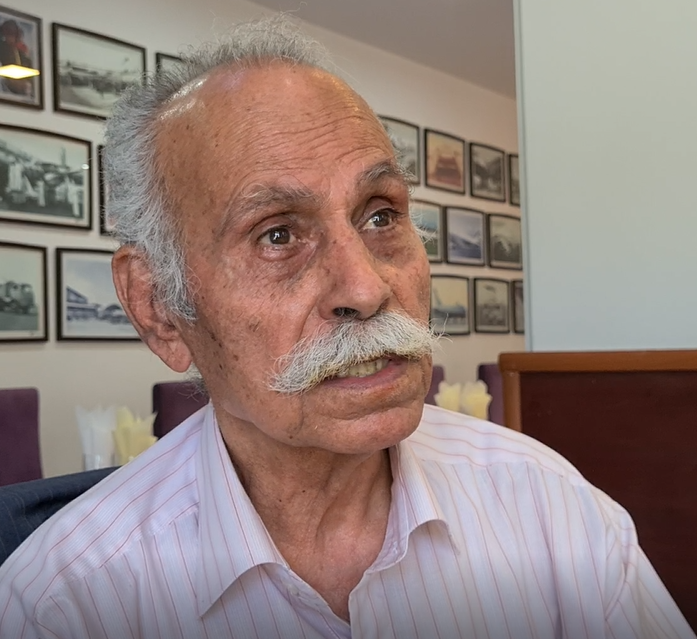
- Mohammad Esmail Azarpad
- Born: 1938 (age 87–88); Iran
- Style: Taekwondo

Mohammad Esmail Azarpad (Persian: محمد اسماعیل آذرپاد born 1938) is a pioneer of taekwondo in Iran, and is referred to as The Father of Iran’s Taekwondo.

He is currently the Veteran Committee Chairman of the Islamic Republic of Iran Taekwondo Federation (IRITF).

He was inducted to Taekwondo Hall of Fame in Las Vegas ceremony in 2013.

== Early life ==
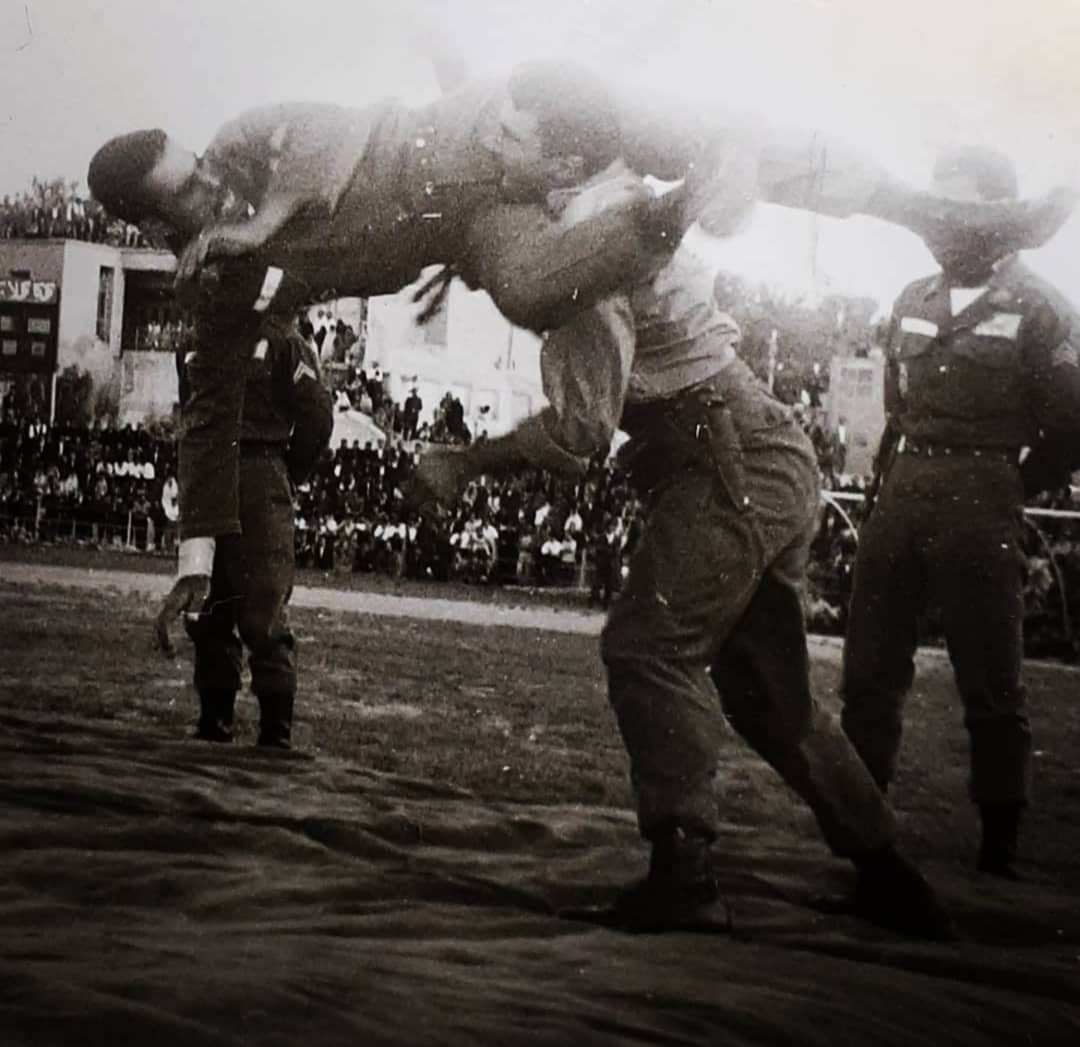
Mr. Azarpad, green beret, man to man combat training

Azarpad joined Imperial Iranian Army in 1957. After two years, he was part of the Parachute Battalion. In 1967, he received ranger training in England. Azarpad was skilled in boxing, self-defense, wrestling, and judo. In 1961, Azarpad started coaching judo and wrestling in Shodjaat sport club in Tehran.

== Establishing Taekwondo in Iran ==
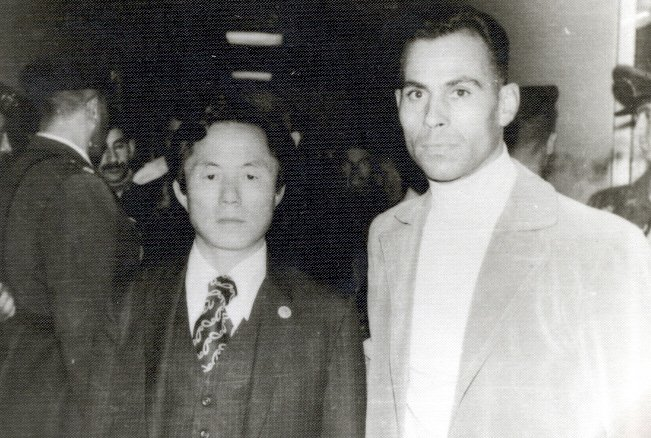
GM Azarpad with General Choi Hong Hi, Tehran 1970

In 1970, a Korean military delegate consisting of Colonel Kim Soo Ryan and his two associates, representing the International Taekwondo Federation (ITF), founded Iran's first taekwondo group practicing Hyeong. This was as a part of the diplomatic, cultural, and military relations between Iran and South Korea. The taekwondo group, which was built under the Army's Sports Department, consisted of about 100 selected officers from the Iranian Armed Forces, who were among the fittest and the most gifted personnel of the day. The course lasted for a year, and about 60 people managed to promote to 1st Dan black belt, and receive the instructor certificate. These instructors organized demonstrations and courses in other military units around the country to introduce taekwondo. Some of the instructors who lived in Tehran started their own clubs, teaching civilians. Thus, taekwondo began to spread among people outside the military as well. The first taekwondo club to start registering civilian members was the army's sports club, Sarbaaz (former Pahlavi Club), with Azarpad as the head coach in 1972. Only Armed Officers' family members were eligible to register and train in this club.

In 1975, Azarpad start practicing under Grandmaster Lee Woon Se and became a master of Poomse in addition to Hyeong / Hyung.

In 1975, the Armed Forces' Taekwondo Association was founded, where in October of the same year managed to send a team consisting of its best members, all from the special forces, to the World Cup in South Korea. In this World Cup, Iran managed to get its first medal, a bronze medal. Iran also participated in the Asian Taekwondo Championships in the spring of 1976 in Melbourne. Iran's Martial Arts Association was founded in 1977 and at the same year the association became a member of the World Taekwondo (former WTF). In the Asian Taekwondo Championship 1978, in Hong Kong, Iran got 3rd place.

== The Father of Iranian Taekwondo ==
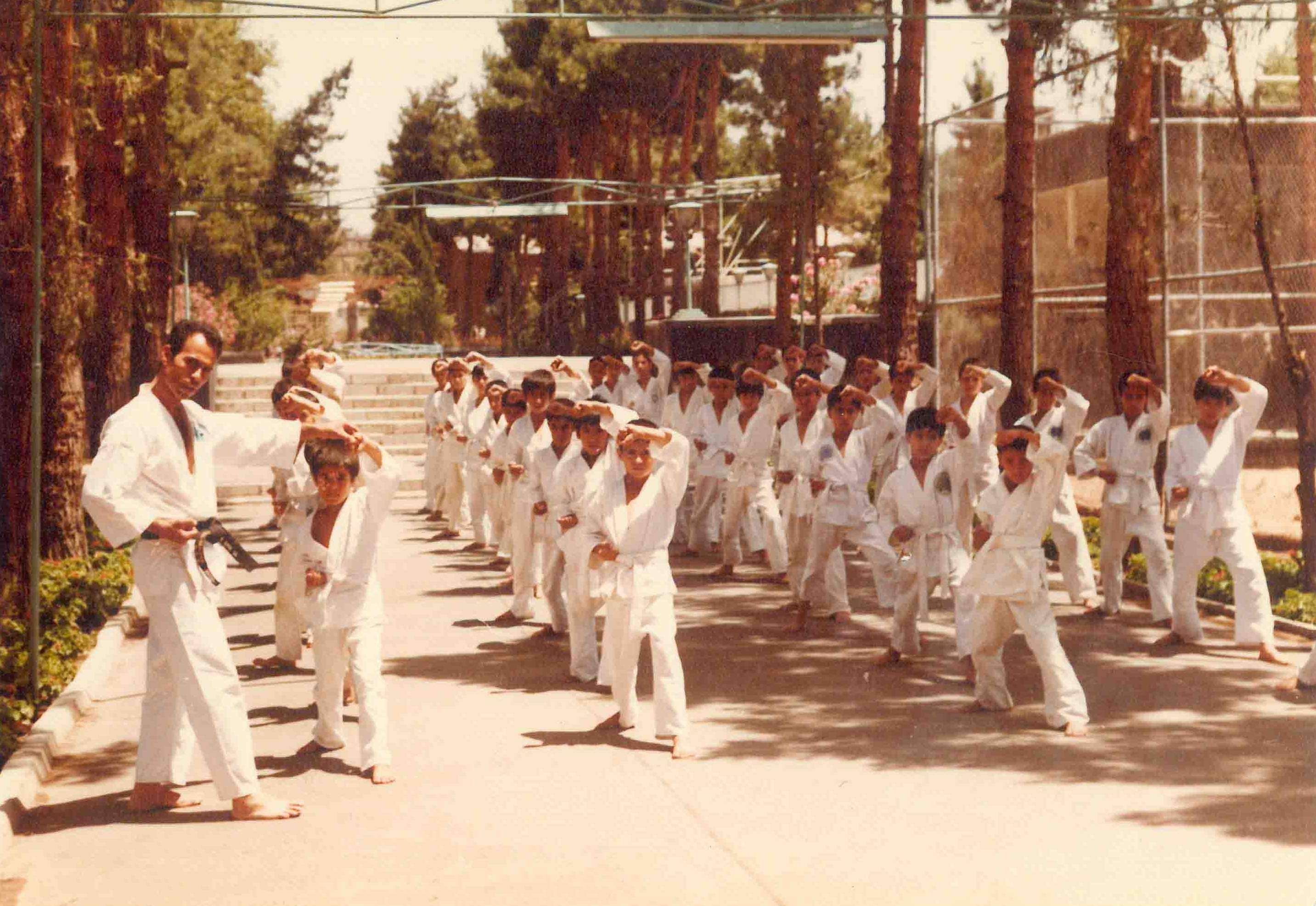
Teaching at Sarbaz (former Pahlavi) Sports Club

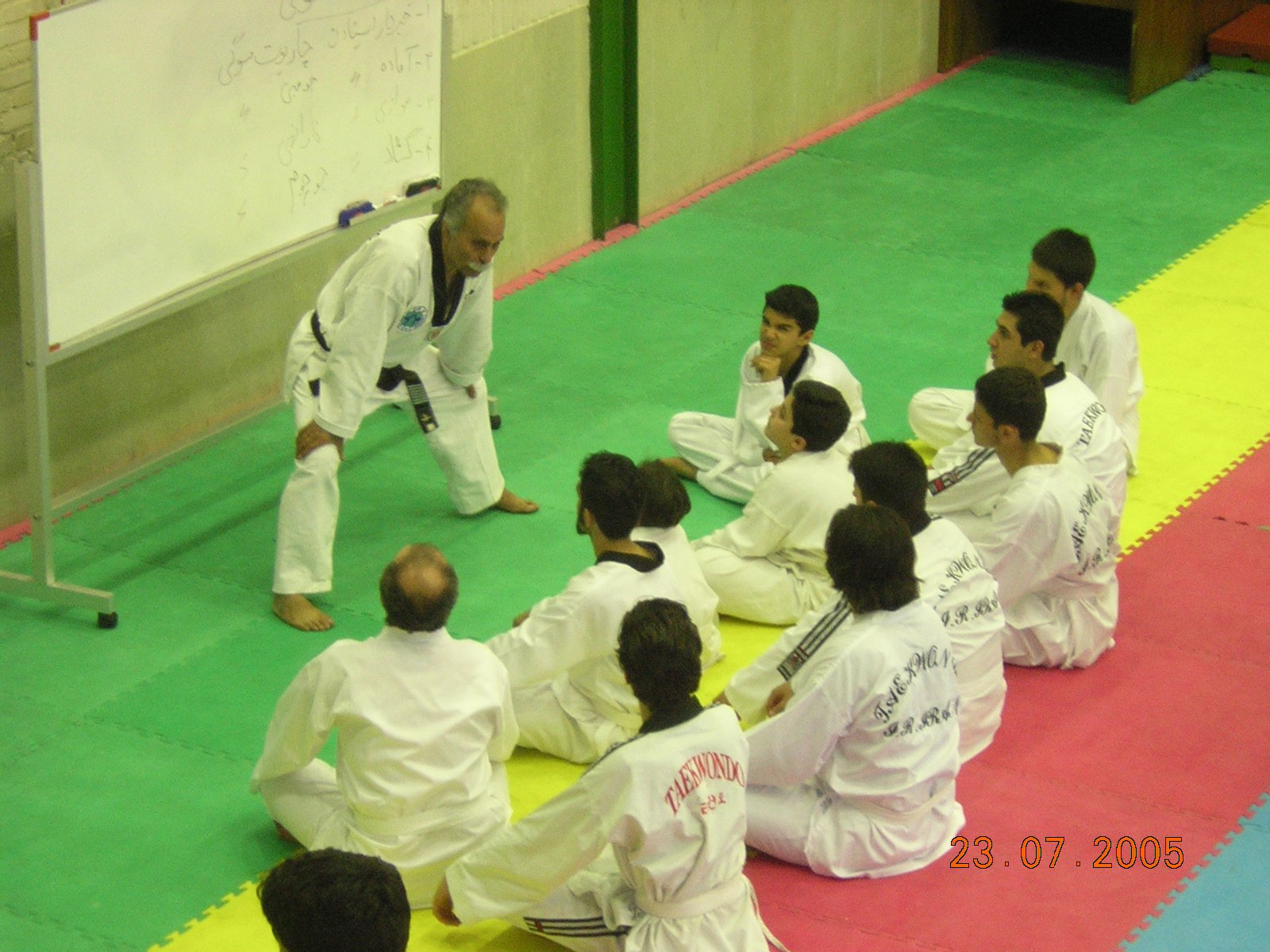
GM Azarpad teaching theory of taekwondo to his students, Tehran 2005

As mentioned earlier, Mr. Azarpad learned taekwondo in Iranian Royal Army under supervision of Master Kim Soo Ryan, and got the title of Senior of the Class for the following reasons:

1. He already ranked the 1st Dan in Judo, and used to be a Judo, self-defense, bayonet fight, and rock climbing instructor by that time. That means prior to taekwondo he had the title of instructor in martial arts and other fields in the royal army.

2. He was an experienced instructor and leader.

3. He was about 12 years older than the fellow taekwondo classmates.

He has been an active pioneer of taekwondo. It is only Grandmaster Azarpad who still is active in the daily life of Iranian taekwondo. Unfortunately, the other members of the pioneer group are not present at the scene for different reasons.

Azarpad has been active in the following fields in addition to teaching taekwondo:

1. International Referee,
2. National Team Head Coach,
3. Teaching at Taekwondo College in the following fields:
  - The philosophy of Emersion of Taekwondo,
  - The Philosophy of Taekwondo's Forms,
  - The History of Taewkondo in the World,
  - The Principles of the Basic Techniques (Kiong jaze),
4. The head of Iranian Taekwondo Federation's Technical Committee,
5. The head of Iranian Taekwondo Federation's Pioneers Committee,
6. Instructor and examiner of Iranian Taekwondo Federation's various training seminars, such as instructor, or referee courses.

Grandmaster Azarpad's name is already strongly tied with the title of Taekwondo's Father of Iran, which is almost irreversible.

These characteristics resemble a father who has spent almost his whole life taking care of and developing taekwondo. Grandmaster Azarpad teaches not only the techniques of taekwondo, but also the true taekwondo way of living.
