= Hyeong =

Martial arts forms used in taekwondo

- Hangul: 형
- Hanja: 形; 型
- RR: hyeong
- MR: hyŏng

Alternate name
- Hangul: 품세
- Hanja: 品勢
- RR: pumse
- MR: p'umse

Alternate name
- Hangul: 틀
- Hanja: 圖
- RR: teul
- MR: t'ŭl

The Korean terms hyeong, pumse, poomsae and teul (meaning "form" or "pattern") are all used to refer to martial arts forms that are typically used in Korean martial arts such as Taekwondo and Tang Soo Do.

- Hyeong (형) is often romanized as hyung. This term is used primarily in earlier styles of taekwondo, often referred to as traditional taekwondo.
- Pumse (품세) is often romanized as poomsae or poomse. This term is used primarily in Kukkiwon/WT (Formerly World Taekwondo Federation or WTF) -style taekwondo.
- Teul (틀) is often romanized as tul. This term is used primarily in ITF-style taekwondo.

A hyeong is a systematic, prearranged sequence of martial techniques that is performed either with or without the use of a weapon. In traditional dojangs (training halls), hyeong are used primarily as a form of interval training that is useful in developing mushin, proper kinetics and mental and physical fortitude. Hyeong may resemble combat, but are artistically non-combative and woven together so as to be an effective conditioning tool. One's aptitude for a particular hyeong may be evaluated in competition. In such competitions, hyeong are evaluated by a panel of judges who base the score on many factors including energy, precision, speed, and control. In Western competitions, there are two general classes of hyeong: creative and standard. Creative hyeong are created by the performer and are generally more acrobatic in nature and do not necessarily reflect the kinetic principles intrinsic in any martial system.

== Summary table of taekwondo forms ==
WT Kukkiwon-style	ITF Chang Hon-style	GTF style	Jhoon Rhee style	ATA Songahm-style	Choong-Sil Style CTF
Unofficial Beginner Forms (usually 3–5)	Beginner Exercises (3)		Beginner Forms (2)		
Kicho Hyeong Il Bu, or Kibon Hana	Saju jirugi		Kamsah		
Kicho Hyeong Ee Bu, or Kibon Dool	Saju makgi		Kyu-Yool		
Kicho Hyeong Sam Bu, or Kibon Set	Saju tulgi				
Color Belt Forms – Taegeuk (8)	Color Belt Forms (9)	Color Belt Forms (11)	Color Belt Forms (8)	Color Belt Forms (9)	
Taegeuk Il Jang (Palgwae Il Jang until 1971)	Chon-Ji		Jayoo	Songahm 1	
Taegeuk Ee Jang (Palgwae Ee Jang until 1971)	Dan-Gun		Chosang	Songahm 2	
Taegeuk Sam Jang (Palgwae Sam Jang until 1971)	Do-San		Hanguk	Songahm 3	
Taegeuk Sa Jang (Palgwae Sa Jang until 1971)		Jee-Sang	Jung-Yi	Songahm 4	Song-Song
Taegeuk Oh Jang (Palgwae Oh Jang until 1971)	Won-Hyo		Pyung-Wa	Songahm 5	
Taegeuk Yook Jang (Palgwae Yook Jang until 1971)	Yul-Gok		Meegook	In Wha 1	
Taegeuk Chil Jang (Palgwae Chil Jang until 1971)		Dhan-Goon	Chasin	In Wha 2	Yong-Gom
Taegeuk Pal Jang (Palgwae Pal Jang until 1971)	Joong-Gun		Might for Right	Choong Jung 1	
	Toi-Gye			Choong Jung 2	
	Hwa-Rang				
	Choong-Moo				
					Hyun-Sil
Black Belt Forms (9)	Black Belt Forms (15)	Black Belt Forms (19)	Black Belt Forms	Black Belt Forms (8)	
Koryo (Original Koryo until 1971)	Kwang-Gae		Same as ITF	Shim Jun	
Keumgang	Po-Eun			Jung Yul	
Taebaek	Ge-Baek			Chung San	
Pyongwon		Jee-Goo		Sok Bong	Sil-Hyun
Sipjin	Eui-Am			Chung Hae	
Jitae	Choong-Jang			Jhang Soo	
Cheonkwon	Juche/Ko-Dang	Ko-Dang		Chul Joon	
Hansoo		Jook-Am		Jeong Seung	
Ilyeo	Sam-Il				
	Yoo-Sin				
	Choi-Yong				
		Pyong-Hwa			
	Yon-Gae				
	Ul-Ji				
	Moon-Moo				
		Sun-Duk			
	So-San				
	Se-Jong				
	Tong-Il				
	U-Nam (former)				
Candidate Demo Forms (never officially finalized)					
Hanryu					
Bikkak					
New Competition Poomsae					
Himchari					
Yamang					
Saebyeol					
Nareusya					
Bigak					
Eoullim					
Saeara					
Hansol					
Narae					
Onnuri					

== Taekwondo forms ==
=== Traditional Taekwondo forms ===
Beginning in 1946, shortly after the conclusion of the Japanese occupation of Korea, new martial arts schools called kwans were opened in Seoul. These schools were established by Korean martial artists who had studied primarily in Okinawa and China during the Japanese occupation. Accordingly, the martial arts practiced in the kwans was heavily influenced by shotokan karate and Chinese martial arts, though elements of taekkyeon and gwonbeop were also incorporated.

Five of these kwans were established during the interval between World War II and the Korean War. During the Korean War, establishment of new schools was halted; at the conclusion of the war four new schools were established by students from the five original kwans. Collectively, these schools are referred to as the nine original kwans of taekwondo. Each kwan practiced its own style of martial art (the term taekwondo had not yet been coined) and employed their own set of forms. The majority of the forms used, however, derived from Shotokan karate. In many cases they were given new names. These forms are still used today in martial arts style such as Tang Soo Do, Soo Bahk Do, Moo Duk Kwan Taekwondo, and Chun Kuk Do. The article Karate kata lists many of the forms used in traditional taekwondo:

- Three Taegeuk forms (Cho Dan, Ee Dan & Sam Dan) are used in Tang Soo Do and traditional Taekwondo as basic, introductory forms for beginners. These correspond to the three Taikyoku forms of Shotokan and are distinctly different from the 8 Taegeuk poomsae practiced in Kukkiwon.
- Five Pyung Ahn forms are used in traditional taekwondo as relatively simple, introductory forms. These correspond to the five Pinan forms of Shotokan.
- Three Shotokan forms called Naihanchi are used, though sometimes they are called Chul-Gi forms when used in taekwondo.
- Shotokan form Bassai is sometimes called Pal-sek.
- Chintō is used under the name Chin-Do.
- Rōhai is used, sometimes under the name Lohai or Nohai due to the Hangeul spelling and varying regional pronunciations (dialect).
- Kūsankū is used under the name Kong-Sang-Kun.
- Enpi is used under the name Sei-shan.
- Jitte is used under the name Ship-soo.
- Gojūshiho is used under the name Oh-sip-sa-bo.

In addition to these Shotokan forms, Tang Soo Do and other traditional styles incorporate additional forms as well, many developed by Hwang Kee.

=== Kukkiwon/WT Pumsae ===
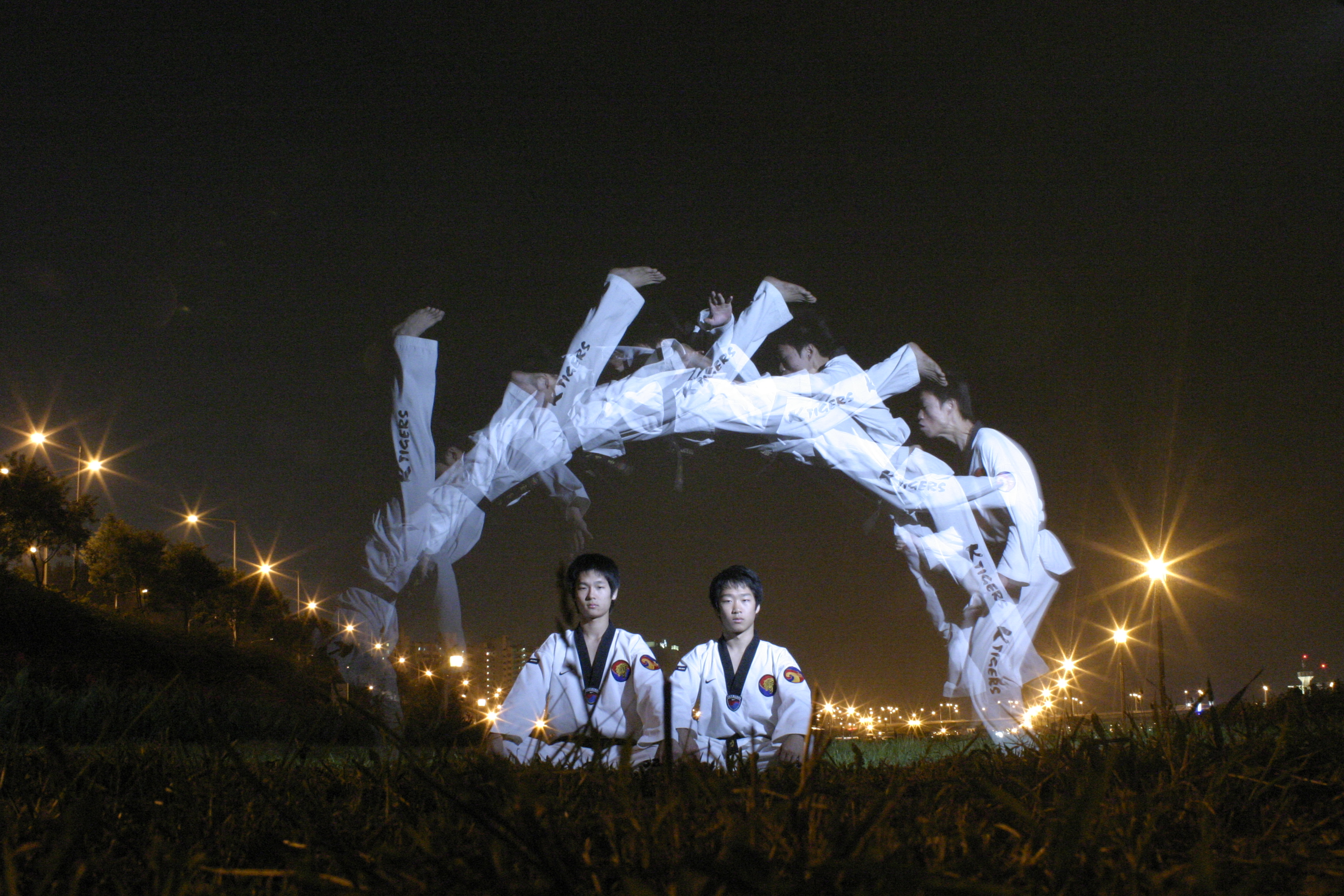
K-Tigers demonstrating the art of pumsae

Kukkiwon-style taekwondo (and thus the World Federation) uses the word pumsae for form.

Prior to 1971, Kukkiwon-style taekwondo used a series of eight forms called the palgwae forms for color-belt forms. The term "pal-gwae" refers to the eight trigrams associated with the I Ching hexagrams. Symbolically, each form in the palgwae series corresponds to one trigram. Subsequent to 1971, the palgwae forms were deprecated in favor of eight taegeuk forms. The term taegeuk refers to the principle of the "unity of opposites". Though the movements in the taegeuk forms are different from those of the palgwae forms, each taegeuk form is likewise associated with a corresponding I Ching trigram.

Kukkiwon-style taekwondo uses a series of nine forms for dan-level black belts; this series is called the yudanja series. The first form in the series, Koryo, was replaced by a new form of the same name in 1971, as part of the transition from the palgwae to taegeuk forms.

==== Color Belt forms ====
- Taegeuk Il Jang/Palgwe Il Jang

Yang for Il Jang

The general meaning of this form and associated trigram is Yang, which represents Heaven and Light. Also, this trigram has a relationship to South and Father. The first Taegeuk/Palgwe form is the beginning of all pumsaes, the "birth" of the martial artist into Taekwondo. This pumsae should be performed with the greatness of Heaven.

- Taegeuk Ee Jang/Palgae Ee Jang

Lake for Ee Jang

The associated trigram of this pumsae represents the Lake(joy, a calm sturdy spirit:). Also, related to the symbol is South East and the relationship of the youngest daughter. The movements of this Taegeuk/Palgwe are aimed to be performed believing that man has limitations, but that we can overcome these limitations. The Lake and its water symbolize the flowing and calm nature of the martial artist. This form is to reflect those attributes.

- Taegeuk Sam Jang/Palgae Sam Jang

Fire for Sam Jang

This trigram represents Fire. Related to this symbol is also East and the relationship of the Second Daughter. Fire contains a lot of energy. The symbol behind the fire is similar to the symbolism of the water in that both can aid and both can destroy. This form is intended to be performed rhythmically, with some outbursts of energy to reflect fire's rhythmic and energetic dualism.

- Taegeuk Sa Jang/Palgae Sa Jang

Thunder for Sa Jang

This trigram represents Thunder. Also, the trigram is strongly connected to northeast and the relationship of the Eldest son. Thunder comes from the sky and is absorbed by the earth, thus, according to the beliefs of the I Ching, thunder is one of the most powerful natural forces. This pumsae is associated with power and the connection between the heavens and earth. This pumsae is intended to be performed with power resembling the Thunder for which it is named.

- Taegeuk O Jang/Palgae O Jang

Wind for Oh Jang

The trigram associated with this pumsae represents Wind. The trigram is also related to southwest and the relationship with an eldest daughter. The I Ching promotes that wind is a gentle force, but can sometimes be furious, destroying everything in its path. As such, it is intended that this pumsae is performed like the wind: gently, but knowing the ability of mass destruction with a single movement. The performer and audience should be aware of the duality of the form.

- Taegeuk Yuk Jang/Palgae Yuk Jang

Water for Yook Jang

The trigram associated with this pumsae represents Water. Also, there is a relation to West and the relationship with a Second son. The movements of this pumsae are intended to be performed like water; flowing, powerful and cleansing. Sometimes standing still like water in a lake, sometimes thriving as a river, sometimes powerful like a waterfall. The water is to symbolize calm and cleansing, while also possessing the attribute of being violent and destructive.

- Taegeuk Chil Jang/Palgae Chil Jang

Mountain for Chil Jang

The trigram associated with this pumsae represents a Mountain. Also, it represents the northwest and youngest son. The symbolism behind the mountain is the indomitable and majestic nature that all mountains possess. This pumsae is intended to be performed with the feeling that all movements are this majestic due to their unconquerable nature.

- Taegeuk Pal Jang/Palgae Pal Jang

Earth for Pal Jang

The trigram associated with this pumsae represents the Earth. Also, there is a representation of North and Mother. The associated trigram of this pumsae is Yin. Yin, here, represents the end of the beginning, the evil part of all that is good. This being the last of the pumsae Taegeuk, it represents the end of the circle and the cyclic nature of the Earth.

==== Black belt forms ====
- Koryo – Koryo, or Goryeo, is the name of an old Korean dynasty. The people from the Goryeo defeated the Mongolian aggressors. It is intended that their spirit is reflected in the movements of the pumsae Koryo. Each movement of this pumsae represents the strength and energy needed to control the Mongols. The line of direction is the shape of the Hanja for a "Scholar", learned man.
- Keumgang – Keumgang means "diamond," symbolizing hardness. Keumgang is also the name of the most beautiful mountain in Korea, as well as the Keumgang warrior, named by Buddha. Thus, the themes of hardness, beauty, and pondering permeate this pumsae.
- Taebaek – The legendary Dangun founded a nation in Taebaek, near Korea's biggest mountain Baekdoo. Baekdoo is a known symbol for Korea. The definition of the word taebaek is literally "lightness". Every movement in this poomsae is intended to be not only be exact and fast, but with determination and hardness resembling the mountain Baekdoo, the origin of the nation of Korea.
- Pyongwon – The definition of Pyongwon is "stretch, vast plain." The name carries with it a connotation of being large and majestic.
- Sipjin – Sipjin stands for ten symbols of longevity, which are Sun, Moon, Mountain, Water, Stone, Pine tree, Herb of eternal youth, Turtle, Deer, and Crane. This pumsae represents the endless development and growth by the basic idea of the ten symbols of longevity and the decimal system.
- Jitae – This pumsae is derived from the meaning of the earth. All things evolve from and return to the earth, the earth is the beginning and the end of life, as reelected through the Yin and Yang.
- Cheonkwon – Cheonkwon literally means 'sky'. In the pumsae, the sky symbolizes the ruler of the universe. According to belief, it is mysterious, infinite and profound. The motions of Cheonkwon are full of piety, vitality and reverence.
- Hansu – This pumsae is derived from the fluidity of water which easily adapts within nature. The symbol of the water repeats itself many times throughout all pumsae, hyeongs, and in martial arts in general.
- Ilyo – The state of spiritual cultivation in Buddhism is called 'Ilyo' which means 'oneness'. In Ilyo, body and mind, spirit and substance, "I" and "you" are unified. The ultimate ideal of the martial art and pumsae can be found in this state. It is a discipline in which every movement is concentrated on leaving all materialistics thoughts, obsessions and external influences behind.

=== GTF forms ===
The Global Taekwondo Federation (GTF) is an offshoot of the International Taekwondo Federation (ITF). It was founded by Park Jung Tae in 1990. The GTF practices Choi's ITF Patterns, but in addition Park added six new patterns. GTF uses the original ITF form Ko-Dang, but never its replacement, Juche.

==== Color Belt forms ====
- Jee-Sang – "JEE" means earth- representing the foundation of the world, "SANG" means above the earth- representing the spirit of the GTF. The 24 movements signify the 24 hours of every day that we learn, connect with each other, gain insight, knowledge and wisdom. The 4 directions in this pattern represent our inner compass.. with it we will never lose our way. When we connect the "JEE" and the "SANG" we connect the heaven and earth to create an invisible strength that lives on. [24 moves]
- Dhan-Goon – DHAN-GOON named after the founder of Korea. The 23 movements in this pattern represent the first two digits of the year 2333 B.C. when, according to legend, Korea was born. This is Park's progressive interpretation of the traditional Taekwon-Do pattern of the same name. [23 moves]

==== Black Belt forms ====
- Jee-Goo – Means "Global". The "X" shape of the form symbolizes crossing out the years of political strife in TaeKwon-Do that has been evident worldwide. The first movement symbolizes the beginning of the new Global TaeKwon-Do Movement – a concept of global peace and harmony. The 30 movements of the pattern are composed of three numbers (24, 4, 2) which explain the purpose. There are 24 hours in each day; therefore this concept will be with us every second. The four directions of movements represent the north, south, east and west encompassing all nations and all people. The four directions are done two times to reinforce our commitment to bring global peace and harmony to the world. [30 moves]
- Jook-Am – Is a pseudonym for Park. Jook means bamboo which shoots up straight forward without any curvature, its roots intertwining to form an inseparable force. Am is an immovable boulder from which the bamboo plants its roots to form an unshakeable foundation. This pattern represents Park's life and his constant struggle for perfection. The diagram is a representation of a bamboo shooting up from the boulder. This pattern's 95 movements (112 including combinations) symbolizes the year 1995 in which Jook-Am was created.
- Pyong-Hwa – Pyong Hwa means "Peace". Park dedicates this pattern for the 50 countries which found the UNO in San Francisco ( USA ) on year 1950 after the second World War. [50 moves]
- Sun-Duk – This pattern is named after Queen Sun Duk of the Silla dynasty 668 A.D., who was known for bringing martial art from China to Korea. The diagram represents "Lady". The 68 movements of this pattern refer to the year 668 A.D. [68 moves]

=== Jhoon Rhee forms ===
Jhoon Rhee Taekwondo or Jhoon Rhee's Martial Arts Ballet is the style of taekwondo developed by taekwondo pioneer Jhoon Rhee and overseen by the organization Jhoon Rhee International. The Jhoon Rhee-style of taekwondo originally used traditional taekwondo forms, then switched to ITF-style forms, then switched again to a set of forms developed by Jhoon Rhee. As a lover of dance and music, and someone who believed that the human form is the greatest of all works of art, Rhee wondered what it would be like to add music to the choreographed body movements of Tae Kwon Do, similar to the way that music is used in Olympic skating, ballroom dancing, and gymnastic floor exercise routines. Rhee choreographed several dances in ballet style, based on Tae Kwon Do moves, and set them to classical music, including Beethoven's Fifth Symphony and the theme from Exodus. The result of Rhee's invention—martial arts ballet—became the foundation for the musical forms competitions that are now popular at many martial arts tournaments in the U.S. The new art form has also found its way to Europe and Russia.

==== Beginner forms (White Belt) ====
- Kamsah – Appreciation Form
- Kyu-Yool – Discipline Form (a drill you must perform if you are late to class, etc.)

==== Color Belt forms ====
- Jayoo – meaning "Freedom" (Gold or Yellow belt) "Stars and Stripes Forever"
- Chosang – meaning "Ancestors" (Orange belt), performed to "God Bless America"
- Hanguk – meaning "Korea" (Green belt), performed to "Aegukga"
- Jung-Yi – meaning "Justice" (Purple belt)
- Pyung-Wa – meaning "Peace" (Blue belt)
- Meegook – meaning "America" (Red belt), performed to "Star-Spangled Banner"
- Chashin – meaning "Confidence" (2nd Brown)
- Might for Right (1st Brown), performed to "Exodus"

==== Black Belt forms ====
- Marriage of East and West (1st Black) "Beethoven's Fifth Symphony"
- Beauty of Mexico (2nd Black) "Granada"

Jhoon Rhee Taekwondo uses ITF forms as its higher dan-level (Black Belt) forms

=== ATA Songahm forms ===
The American Taekwondo Association (ATA) was founded in 1969 in Omaha, Nebraska by Haeng Ung Lee, a former Traditional Taekwondo instructor in the South Korean military. Songahm taekwondo is the style of martial arts practiced at ATA affiliated schools. Songahm means "Pine Tree and Rock." According to the ATA, the term Songahm itself represents "Evergreen strength the year round, long life and a symbol of unchanging human loyalty" as represented by the pine tree and the rock.

==== Color belts forms ====
- Songahm 1 – 18 moves
- Songahm 2 – 23 moves
- Songahm 3 – 28 moves
- Songahm 4 – 31 moves
- Songahm 5 – 34 moves
- In Wha 1 – 44 moves
- In Wha 2 – 42 moves
- Choong Jung 1 – 44 moves
- Choong Jung 2 – 46 moves

==== Black Belts forms ====
- Shim – 1 Jun Dan, 81 moves
- Jung Yul – 2nd Dan, 82 moves
- Chung San – 3rd Dan, 83 moves
- Sok Bong – 4th Dan, 84 moves
- Chung Hae – 5th Dan, 95 moves
- Jhang Soo – 6th Dan, 96 moves
- Chul Joon – 7th Dan, 97 moves
- Jeong Seung – 8th Dan, 98 moves

== Tang Soo Do & Song Moo Kwan Taekwondo forms ==
There are several different Tang Soo Do organizations around the world, but they generally follow a similar course with regard to hyeong. Most Tang Soo Do hyeong are related by borrowing from Japanese/Okinawan kata, with the names often directly translated from the Japanese.

=== Gicho/Kicho ===
Some schools teach new students the gicho/kicho, "basic," hyeong:

- (Kicho) Hyeong Il Bu (as taught by Shin, Kyung Sun of Military Arts Institute in Chicago, IL., is different from most Tang Soo Do organizations)
- (Kicho) Hyeong Ee Bu (as taught by Shin, Kyung Sun of Military Arts Institute in Chicago, IL., is different from most Tang Soo Do organizations)
- (Kicho) Hyeong Sam Bu (as taught by Shin, Kyung Sun of Military Arts Institute in Chicago, IL., is different from most Tang Soo Do organizations)
- (Kicho) Hyeong Sa Bu (as taught by Shin, Kyung Sun of Military Arts Institute in Chicago, IL.)
- (Kicho) Hyeong Oh Bu (as taught by Shin, Kyung Sun of Military Arts Institute in Chicago, IL.)

The Kicho hyeong are extremely similar to the Taikyoku kata developed by Yoshitaka Funakoshi (son of the Japanese karate master Gichin Funakoshi). The embusen used are the same, the stances are the Tang Soo Do equivalent, and the blocks and strikes are virtually identical. There is great reason to believe that Hwang Kee based his Korean Kicho hyeong on the Japanese Taikyoku kata.

The Kicho hyeong were developed as a basic, simple form for beginners. The symbol used in Tang Soo Do for the Kicho hyeong is a human baby learning to walk. The pattern is also visible in the increasingly complex forms that follow. Hwang Kee used these forms to teach applications of basic moves and techniques. These forms are also influenced by the Wa Ka Ryu style of southern China. These and the Pyung Ahn forms to follow are characterized by speed, aggressiveness, dynamic action, and quick reaction.

In the 1970s, Chuck Norris added new versions of the Giecho Hyung to his American Tang Soo Do system. Giecho Hyung Il Bu still resembles the original Korean/Japanese version, but Yi (Ee) Bu and Sahm Bu have been modified. Norris created advanced versions of Il Bu and Yi Bu, by adding kicks, reverse punches and switching between forward and back stances.

=== Sae Kye ===
The World Tang Soo Do Association has modified the Kicho Hyeong, adding some kicks to it: These are the very first forms you learn if you are a part of World Tang Soo Do Association,(WTSDA).

- Sae Kye Hyeong Il Bu
- Sae Kye Hyeong E Bu
- Sae Kye Hyeong Sam Bu

=== Taegeuk ===
The Taeguek hyung are a series of three forms that correspond to the Shotokan Taikyoku kata. They were created by Yoshitaka “Gigō” Funakoshi Sensei, the son of Gichin Funakoshi Sensei who named them. The Japanese name Taikyoku (太極) directly translates to Taegeuk (태극) in Korean and means First Cause based on its Japanese name. Taikyoku and as such Taegeuk refers to the Chinese philosophical concept of Taiji. In his book "Karate-do Kyohan" Funakoshi wrote: “Because of its simplicity, the kata is easily learned by beginners. Nevertheless, as its name implies, this form is of the most profound character and one to which, upon mastery of the art of karate, an expert will return to select it as the ultimate training kata” (page 42, ‘Karate-Do Kyohan’).

As Tang Soo Do and Song Moo Kwan Taekwondo to this day are closely related to its Japanese parent style Shotokan Karate, these hyung were also incorporated and are practiced by many schools of those styles. (Side note: These forms are distinctly different from the 8 Taegeuk (Il Jang – Pal Jang) hyung practiced in Kukkiwon and precede their creation by about 3 decades.)

- Taegeuk Cho Dan – This first hyeong often simply referred to as "kibon", is the first of the series, and involves only two basic moves: the arae makgi (low block), and a chung dan (middle) Bandae Jireugi (front or lunge punch). All stances, except at the beginning and end, are Ap Gubi (front stance). There are 20 steps to this hyong.
- Taegeuk Ee Dan – This hyeong is the second of the series. It is similar to Taegeuk Cho Dan, except that the chung dan (middle) punches are all replaced with sang dan (upper level) punches. In some variations, the “arae makgi” are also replaced with “eolgul makgi”. There are 20 steps to this hyong as well.
- Taegeuk Sam Dan – The third hyong of the series also has 20 steps. It is once again similar to the first and second hyong, except that moves 1, 3, 9, 11, 17 and 19 are replaced with Bakkat Makgi (inside middle blocks) executed in Dwit Gubi (back stance).

=== Pyong Ahn ===
The Pyong Ahn hyung are a series of five forms cognate in many ways to the pinan kata series of karate. They were reorganized by Master Itosu, an Okinawan practitioner of Tote and mentor of Funakoshi Gichin. They were originally a single form called Jae Nam (Channan). To make them easier to learn and safer for younger practitioners, the form was divided, and the more dangerous and lethal techniques were removed. These newly organized hyung were designed as training forms to prepare for Kong Sang Koon (Kusanku). For a more comprehensive description of these hyung see Pinan Kata.

- Pyong Ahn Cho Dan – The first of the Pyong Ahn series that most practitioners learn, much of this form is a combination of gicho hyung il bu and ee bu. This form also employs low knife-hand blocks (ha dan soodo mahkkee). It is also the first hyung to incorporate multiple techniques per count (the low block/middle knife hand block combination).
- Pyong Ahn Ee Dan – This hyeong is one count/technique longer than the other low-rank forms, due to one of its techniques, a side kick (yup podo chagi), which is performed in two counts, the first to set up and the second to deliver. It is also one of the few low-level hyung to have a kihap (yell) on the last move. Most forms feature their kihaps between the first and last techniques. The most-often used technique in this hyung is the middle knife-hand block in a back stance (hugul choong dan soodo mahkkee).
- Pyong Ahn Sam Dan – The third of the pyong ahn forms, this is also the shortest. While the forms before it involve an I-structure for movement, this form instead goes along an inverted T-structure, cutting out several counts. Its series of outside-inside kicks (pahkeso ahnuro chagi) to sideways elbow blocks (palkoom mahkkee) and hammerfist strikes (kwondo kong kyuk) is its most recognizable feature. It also ends with a kihab.
- Pyong Ahn Sa Dan – This form starts out much like Pyong Ahn Ee Dan, except that where Pyong Ahn Ee Dan has closed fists on its first blocks, Pyong Ahn Sa Dan has open hands. It is cognate to the Shotokan kata Pinan Yondan.
- Pyong Ahn O Dan – Cognate to Pinan Godan, this is the final hyung of the series, as well as the most involved. Its key features are cross-legged stances (kyo charip jaseh) and a jump followed by a double arm X low block (song soo hadan mahkkee).

The phrase "Pyong Ahn" (平安, 평안) is a direct Korean translation of the Kanji/Hanja characters that spell the word Pinan/Heian in Japanese. In English, it translates to "Peaceful Mind." These forms are usually taught after the Taegeuk hyung. These forms were reorganized from their original form (called "Jae-Nam") in approximately 1870. In their original state they are run in sequence starting with the second form Pyong Ahn Ee Dan, to Pyong Ahn Cho Dan, and then to Pyong Ahn Sam Dan, Pyong Ahn Sa Dan, and Pyong Ahn O Dan, an order different from the order they are learned. Though designed as open hand forms (weaponless), their versatility allows weapon application very easily. Common adaptations include the sai, chool bong (nunchaku), and chung bong (middle staff). These forms show the influence of the southern China martial art style.

The Pyung Ahn hyung can be represented by the tortoise. The tortoise is well balanced, calm, and peaceful (pyung) and it carries its "home" on its back in the form of its shell. These forms are meant as a means of defense and should promote security (ahn). Also like the tortoise, they are meant to inspire longevity through both balance and security.

=== Naihanchi/Naebojin/Keema ===
The Keema hyeong series are borrowed from the naihanchi series of karate, and in fact some schools use the name Naihanchi for these forms. The level at which they are taught varies, but their difficulty and technicality means that they are most often reserved for red/black belts, though not always directly after each other. Hwang Kee assigned the Horse to represent the form. They are:

- Naihanchi Cho Dan
- Naihanchi Ee Dan
- Naihanchi Sam Dan

=== Bassai/Passai/Palche/Bal Sak ===
The "Bassai" pattern, meaning "to penetrate a fortress," has cognates in both Chinese, Japanese and Korean martial arts. Moreover, there are many variations upon the two Bassai hyeong present in Tang Soo Do, Bassai(Palche) So and Bassai(Palche) Deh. Some schools only practice Palche De, the "greater" of the two forms. These are usually higher-belt forms. The animal these forms represent is the snake.

=== Sip Soo/Ship Soo ===
Meaning "Ten Hands," Ship Soo (or Sip Soo, depending on the Romanization) is cognate to the karate kata Jitte, though there are differences. Traditionally, this hyeong contains only hand techniques (its name can be taken to mean "all hands"), but some styles of Tang Soo Do do include kicking techniques. Its variations are many, and depend on the school, as with all hyeong. This form supposedly represents the bear.

=== Chinto/Jindo/Jinte ===
Jinte is a typically high-rank hyeong, whose hanja can be read as "Battle East". The hyeong requires balance with one legged techniques, and is often seen at tournament hyeong competitions.

ITF Tang Soo Do refers to the form as Jintae, instead of Chinto or Jindo.

=== Chil Sung and Yuk Ro ===
These two series of hyeong were created by Hwang Kee, who founded the Moo Duk Kwan organization. Chil Sung literally means "Seven Stars" in Korean. These are presumably represented by the seven forms of the series. "Yuk" meaning "six" and "Ro" means "Path". These forms represent the "six paths" taken in connecting the Physical, Mental, and Spiritual in Tang Soo Do/ Soo Bahk Do.

Chil Sung series:

- Chil Sung Il Ro
- Chil Sung Ee Ro
- Chil Sung Sam Ro
- Chil Sung Sa Ro
- Chil Sung O Ro
- Chil Sung Yuk Ro
- Chil Sung Chil Ro

Yuk Ro series:

- Yuk Ro Cho Dan (Du Mun)
- Yuk Ro Ee Dan (Joong Jol)
- Yuk Ro Sam Dan (Po Wol)
- Yuk Ro Sa Dan (Yang Pyun)
- Yuk Ro O Dan (Sahl Chu)
- Yuk Ro Yuk Dan (Choong Ro)

=== Cheonbong ===
The Cheonbong (天峰, 천봉) poomsae are a series of six empty hand forms taught mainly in Song Moo Kwan Taekwondo. The Cheonbong poomsae were designed by Grandmaster Hyon. His training with “Wing Chun” instructors inspired the creation of this poomsae series and is very evident in its flowing techniques and its overall presentation. Cheonbong II bon, Sam bon and O bon incorporate power-based techniques, while Cheonbong Ee bon, Sa bon and Yuk bon are focused on speed techniques.

The foremost living authority on the poomsae series is Grandmaster Robert Frankovich (8th Dan, Song Moo Kwan). The name Cheonbong (sometimes spelled as “Chung Bong”) was initially only verbally communicated through the lineage of its practitioners and as such passed down to GM Frankovich. Although it is not specifically known how or why, at some point the poomsae was referred to in English as “Blue Tree”. Through meticulous research, GM Frankovich later determined that the name actually means “Heaven’s Peak”.

In his book “The Complete Series: Song Moo Kwan Chung Bong Hyung” Frankovich writes: “The stances in the Chung Bong hyungs reflect the Japanese influence in Korean martial arts. They are low and wide to provide greater stability and strength. The use of these deep stances may hinder movement and are not intended to be used in free sparring or combat situations. The Chung Bong hyung also use some modified stances that help connect techniques with a more fluid movement. These stances are used for their benefits in increasing the physical condition of the student by helping develop stability and in generating power. There are three concepts that need to be examined to help in the development of proper stances. Each concept uses the extremes to describe the way to adjust the stance.

The concept of "width" can be determined by viewing the stance from the front. Most stances are shoulder width and some wider. Students are often corrected by being told the stance is too narrow or too wide. Students tend to be quite narrow when first learning.

Another concept is the "length" of a stance, which is viewed from the side. The most common problem in length is being too short. This occurs when a student doesn't step far enough forward and has nearly straight legs. In all stances, the student should be low enough that the bent knee(s) hide the foot from view. Stances shouldn't be so long that they cause a balance problem when the student tries to move for a technique. That is, aptly, called too long. Being too long isn't really a problem as often as being too short.

The last concept is one that can eliminate directional problems. Often the terms "lead" and "back" are used to describe which body part will do the technique. "Lead" is the side closest to your opponent and "back" is the side farthest from your opponent. This can help to differentiate which body part is to move without using left or right. The use of left and right is associated with the weight distribution in a particular stance. The leg that has the majority of the weight resting on it is most often said to be left or right. An example of this is a back stance, which has 70% of the body weight resting on the back leg. So, if the right leg is the back leg then the stance is a right back stance. The Half “Kimase” stances have even weight distribution and are left or right, according to which knee is bent. There are many transitionary stances that occur within these hyungs. Due to that fact, it is most often stated that a student "ends" in a proper stance, rather than "lands" in a proper stance.”

Since the publication of GM Frankovich’s book, a number of Song Moo Kwan Taekwondo schools have begun teaching one of more of these poomsae and their popularity is ever growing.

== See also ==
- Korean martial arts
- Kata
- Teul
- Karate kata
- Taegeuk (Taekwondo)
