= Han Moo Kwan =

Taekwondo schools or kwan teaching

Han Moo Kwan, was founded in August 1954 by Kyo-yoon Lee and is one of the nine original Kwans that later formed Kukkiwon Taekwondo.

Lee was a student at the Chosun Yun Moo Kwan Kwon Bop Bu (sometimes spelled "Yun Mu Kwan" in English transliteration), learning from its founder, Sang-sap Chun. Later, after the Korean War Armistice Agreement was signed in 1953, Lee started teaching the returning Yun Moo Kwan Kwon Bop Bu members at the Hankuk Chaeyuk Kwan Dojang. He had conflicts with Chong-woo Lee and left to start his own annex Kwan by setting up a tent at a high school. Later, Chong-woo Lee changed the Yun Moo Kwan Kwon Bop Bu's name to Jidokwan. Kyo-yoon Lee states that Han Moo Kwan is from Choson Yun Moo Kwan Kwon Bop Bu, not Jidokwan.[1]

In his time, Kyo Yoon Lee continued to be active in the Kukkiwon and served on the High Dan/Poom Black Belt promotion committee of the Kukkiwon.

Korea Han Moo Kwan still exists today, but only as a fraternal social friendship club. The official training curriculum endorsed by Korea Han Moo Kwan is the Kukkiwon curriculum. Korea Han Moo Kwan supports the Kukkiwon.

== Meaning ==
The word Han means Korea, the word Moo means Military or Martial, and the word Kwan means School or Hall; together Han Moo Kwan means "Korean Military School".
