= Korean numerals =

Numbers in traditional Korean writing

The Korean language has two regularly used sets of numerals: a native Korean system and Sino-Korean system. The native Korean number system is used for general counting, like counting up to 99. It is also used to count people, hours, objects, ages, and more. Sino-Korean numbers on the other hand are used for purposes such as dates, money, minutes, addresses, phone numbers, and numbers above 99.

== Construction ==
For both native and Sino-Korean numerals, the teens (11 through 19) are represented by a combination of tens and the ones places. For instance, 15 would be sib-o (십오; 十五; lit. 'ten five'), but not usually il-sib-o (일십오; 一十五; lit. 'one ten five') in the Sino-Korean system, and yeol-daseot (열다섯; lit. 'ten five') in native Korean. Twenty through ninety are likewise represented in this place-holding manner in the Sino-Korean system, while native Korean has its own unique set of words, as can be seen in the chart below. The grouping of large numbers in Korean follows the Chinese tradition of myriads (10000) rather than thousands (1000). The Sino-Korean system is nearly entirely based on the Chinese numerals.

The distinction between the two numeral systems is very important. Everything that can be counted will use one of the two systems, but seldom both. Sino-Korean words are sometimes used to mark ordinal usage: yeol beon (열번) means "ten times" while sip beon (십번; 十番) means "number ten."

When denoting the age of a person, one will usually use sal (살) for the native Korean numerals, and se (세; 歲) for Sino-Korean. For example, seumul-daseot sal (스물다섯 살) and i-sib-o se (이십오 세; 二十五歲) both mean 'twenty-five-year-old'. See also East Asian age reckoning.

The Sino-Korean numerals are used to denote the minute of time. For example, sam-sib-o bun (삼십오 분; 三十五分) means "__:35" or "thirty-five minutes." The native Korean numerals are used for the hours in the 12-hour system and for the hours 0:00 to 12:00 in the 24-hour system. The hours 13:00 to 24:00 in the 24-hour system are denoted using both the native Korean numerals and the Sino-Korean numerals. For example, se si (세시) means '03:00' or '3:00 a.m./p.m.' and sip-chil si (십칠 시; 十七時) or yeol-ilgop si (열일곱 시) means '17:00'.

Some of the native numbers take a different form in front of measure words:

| Number | Native Korean cardinals | | | Attributive forms of native Korean cardinals | | |
| Number | Hangul | McCune–Reischauer | Revised | Hangul | McCune–Reischauer | Revised |
|---|---|---|---|---|---|---|
| 1 | 하나 | hana | | 한 | han | |
| 2 | 둘 | tul | dul | 두 | tu | du |
| 3 | 셋 | set | | 세 | se | |
| 4 | 넷 | net | | 네 | ne | |
| 20 | 스물 | sŭmul | seumul | 스무 | sŭmu | seumu |

The descriptive forms for 1, 2, 3, 4, and 20 are formed by "dropping the last letter" from the original native cardinal, so to speak. Examples:

- 한 번 han beon ("once")
- 두 개 du gae ("two things")
- 세 시 se si ("three o'clock"), in contrast, in North Korea the Sino-Korean numeral 삼 "sam" would normally be used; making it 삼시 "sam si"
- 네 명 ne myeong ("four people")
- 스무 마리 seumu mari ("twenty animals")

Something similar also occurs in some Sino-Korean cardinals:

- 오뉴월 onyuwol ("May and June")
- 유월 yuwol ("June")
- 시월 siwol ("October")

The cardinals for three and four have alternative forms in front of some measure words:

- 석 달 seok dal ("three months")
- 넉 잔 neok jan ("four cups")

Korean has several words formed with two or three consecutive numbers. Some of them have irregular or alternative forms.

- 한둘 handul ("one or two") / 한두 handu ("one or two" in front of measure words)
- 두셋 duset ("two or three") / 두세 duse ("two or three" in front of measure words)
- 서넛 seoneot ("three or four") / 서너 seoneo ("three or four" in front of measure words)
- 두서넛 duseoneot ("two or three or four") / 두서너 duseoneo ("two or three or four" in front of measure words)
- 너덧 neodeot, 네댓 nedaet, 네다섯 nedaseot, 너더댓 neodeodaet ("four or five")
- 대여섯 daeyeoseot, 대엿 daeyeot ("five or six")
- 예닐곱 yenilgop ("six or seven")
- 일고여덟 ilgoyeodeol, 일여덟 ilyeodeol ("seven or eight")
- 여덟아홉 yeodeolahop, 엳아홉 yeotahop ("eight or nine")

As for counting days in native Korean, another set of unique words are used:

- 하루 haru ("one day")
- 이틀 iteul ("two days")
- 사흘 saheul ("three days")
- 사나흘 sanaheul, 사날 sanal ("three or four days")
- 나흘 naheul ("four days")
- 네댓새 nedaessae, 너댓새 neodaessae, 너더댓새 neodeodaessae, 나달 nadal ("four or five days")
- 닷새 dassae ("five days")
- 대엿새 daeyeossae ("five or six days")
- 엿새 yeossae ("six days")
- 예니레 yenire ("six or seven days")
- 이레 ire ("seven days")
- 일여드레 ilyeodeure ("seven or eight days")
- 여드레 yeodeure ("eight days")
- 아흐레 aheure ("nine days")
- 열흘 yeolheul ("ten days")

The native Korean saheul (사흘; lit. ''three days'') is often misunderstood as the Sino-Korean sail (사일; 四日; lit. ''four days'') due to similar sounds. The two words are different in origin and have different meanings.

== Cardinal numerals ==
| Number | Sino-Korean cardinal numbers | | | Native Korean cardinal numbers | |
| Number | Hanja | Hangul | Romanization | Hangul | Romanization |
|---|---|---|---|---|---|
| 0 | 零/空 | 영, 령 / 공 | yeong, ryeong / gong | — | — |
| 1 | 一 | 일 | il | 하나 | hana |
| 2 | 二 | 이 | i | 둘 | dul |
| 3 | 三 | 삼 | sam | 셋 | set |
| 4 | 四 | 사 | sa | 넷 | net |
| 5 | 五 | 오 | o | 다섯 | daseot |
| 6 | 六 | 육, 륙 | yuk, ryuk | 여섯 | yeoseot |
| 7 | 七 | 칠 | chil | 일곱 | ilgop |
| 8 | 八 | 팔 | pal | 여덟 | yeodeol |
| 9 | 九 | 구 | gu | 아홉 | ahop |
| 10 | 十 | 십 | sip | 열 | yeol |
| 11 | 十一 | 십일 | sip-il | 열하나 | yeol-hana |
| 12 | 十二 | 십이 | sip-i | 열둘 | yeol-dul |
| 13 | 十三 | 십삼 | sip-sam | 열셋 | yeol-set |
| 14 | 十四 | 십사 | sip-sa | 열넷 | yeol-net |
| 15 | 十五 | 십오 | sip-o | 열다섯 | yeol-daseot |
| 16 | 十六 | 십육, 십륙 | sim-nyuk, sip-ryuk^{[note 1]} | 열여섯 | yeol-yeoseot |
| 17 | 十七 | 십칠 | sip-chil | 열일곱 | yeol-ilgop |
| 18 | 十八 | 십팔 | sip-pal | 열여덟 | yeol-yeodeol |
| 19 | 十九 | 십구 | sip-gu | 열아홉 | yeol-ahop |
| 20 | 二十 | 이십 | i-sip | 스물 | seumul |
| 30 | 三十 | 삼십 | sam-sip | 서른 | seoreun |
| 40 | 四十 | 사십 | sa-sip | 마흔 | maheun |
| 50 | 五十 | 오십 | o-sip | 쉰 | swin |
| 60 | 六十 | 육십, 륙십 | yuk-sip, ryuk-sip | 예순 | yesun |
| 70 | 七十 | 칠십 | chil-sip | 일흔 | ilheun |
| 80 | 八十 | 팔십 | pal-sip | 여든 | yeodeun |
| 90 | 九十 | 구십 | gu-sip | 아흔 | aheun |
| 100 | 百 | 백 | baek | 온^{[note 2]} | on |
| 1,000 | 千 | 천 | cheon | 즈믄^{[note 2]} | jeumeun |
| 10,000 | 萬 | 만 | man | 골^{[note 2]} | gol |
| 100,000,000 | 億 | 억 | eok | — | — |
| 10^{12} | 兆 | 조 | jo | — | — |
| 10^{16} | 京 | 경 | gyeong | — | — |
| 10^{20} | 垓 | 해 | hae | — | — |
| 10^{24} | 秭 | 자^{[note 3]} | ja | — | — |
| 10^{28} | 穰 | 양^{[note 3]} | yang | — | — |
| 10^{32} | 溝 | 구^{[note 3]} | gu | — | — |
| 10^{36} | 澗 | 간^{[note 3]} | gan | — | — |
| 10^{40} | 正 | 정^{[note 3]} | jeong | — | — |
| 10^{44} | 載 | 재^{[note 3]} | jae | — | — |
| 10^{48} | 極 | 극^{[note 3]} | geuk | — | — |
| 10^{52} or 10^{56} | 恒河沙 | 항하사^{[note 4]} | hanghasa | — | — |
| 10^{56} or 10^{64} | 阿僧祇 | 아승기^{[note 4]} | aseunggi | — | — |
| 10^{60} or 10^{72} | 那由他 | 나유타^{[note 4]} | nayuta | — | — |
| 10^{64} or 10^{80} | 不可思議 | 불가사의^{[note 4]} | bulgasaui | — | — |
| 10^{68} or 10^{88} | 無量大數 | 무량대수^{[note 4]} | muryangdaesu | — | — |

== Larger numbers ==
In numbers above 10, elements are combined from largest to smallest, and zeros are implied. Hanja and Hangul numerals are both multiplicative additive rather than positional; for example, the number 20 is written as the character for two (二/이) followed by the character for ten (十/십), resulting in two tens, or twenty (二十/이십).

== Pronunciation ==
The initial consonants of measure words and numbers following the native cardinals 여덟 ('eight', only when the ㅂ is not pronounced) and 열 ('ten') become tensed consonants when possible. Thus for example:

- 열둘 (twelve) is pronounced like [열뚤]
- 여덟권 (eight (books)) is pronounced like [여덜꿘]

Several numerals have long vowels, namely 둘 (two), 셋 (three) and 넷 (four), but these become short when combined with other numerals / nouns (such as in twelve, thirteen, fourteen and so on).

The usual liaison and consonant-tensing rules apply, so for example, 예순여섯 yesun-yeoseot (sixty-six) is pronounced like [예순녀섣] (yesun-nyeoseot) and 칠십 chil-sip (seventy) is pronounced like [칠씹] chil-ssip.

== Constant suffixes used in Sino-Korean ordinal numerals ==
Beon (번; 番), ho (호; 號), cha (차; 次), and hoe (회; 回) are always used with Sino-Korean or Arabic ordinal numerals. For example, Yihoseon (이호선; 二號線) is Line Number Two in a metropolitan subway system. Samsipchilbeongukdo (37번국도; 37番國道) is highway number 37. They cannot be used interchangeably.

906호 (號) is 'Apt #906' in a mailing address. 906 without ho (호) is not used in spoken Korean to imply apartment number or office suite number. The special prefix je (제; 第) is usually used in combination with suffixes to designate a specific event in sequential things such as the Olympics.

== Substitution for disambiguation ==
In commerce or the financial sector, some Hanja for each Sino-Korean numbers are replaced by alternative ones to prevent ambiguity or retouching.

| English | Hangul | Hanja | Financial Hanja |
|---|---|---|---|
| one | 일 | 一 | 壹 |
| two | 이 | 二 | 貳 |
| three | 삼 | 三 | 參 |
| four | 사 | 四 | 肆 |
| five | 오 | 五 | 伍 |
| six | 육, 륙 | 六 | 陸 |
| seven | 칠 | 七 | 柒 |
| eight | 팔 | 八 | 捌 |
| nine | 구 | 九 | 玖 |
| ten | 십 | 十 | 拾 |
| hundred | 백 | 百 | 佰 |
| thousand | 천 | 千 | 仟, 阡 |

For verbally communicating number sequences such as phone numbers, ID numbers, etc., especially over the phone, native Korean numbers for 1 and 2 are sometimes substituted for the Sino-Korean numbers. For example, o-o-o hana-dul-hana-dul (오오오 하나둘하나둘) instead of o-o-o il-i-il-i (오오오 일이일이) for '555-1212', or sa-o-i-hana (사-오-이-하나) instead of sa-o-i-il (사-오-이-일) for '4521', because of the potential confusion between the two similar-sounding Sino-Korean numbers.

For the same reason, military transmissions are known to use mixed native Korean and Sino-Korean numerals:

하나 둘 삼 넷 오 여섯 칠 팔 아홉 공
hana dul sam net o yeoseot chil pal ahop gong

== Notes ==
- Note 1: Korean assimilation rules apply as if the underlying form were 십륙 |sip.ryuk|, giving sim-nyuk instead of the expected sib-yuk.
- Note 2: These names are considered archaic, and are not used.
- Note 3: The numbers higher than 10^{20} (hae) are not usually used.
- Note 4: The names for these numbers are from Buddhist texts; they are not usually used. Dictionaries sometimes disagree on which numbers the names represent.

== See also ==
- Korean language
- Korean count word
