= Song Moo Kwan =

Taekwondo discipline

- Also known as: Songmookwan
- Date founded: March 20, 1944
- Country of origin: Kaesŏng, North Hwanghae Province, North Korea
- Founder: Byung Jik Ro
- Arts taught: Taekwondo
- Ancestor arts: Kong Soo Do, Shaolin Kung Fu, Hapkido
- Ancestor schools: Korean Kongsoodo Association
- Official website: www.songmookwan.com

- Song Moo Kwan
- Hangul: 송무관
- Hanja: 松武館
- RR: Songmugwan
- MR: Songmugwan

Song Moo Kwan, also named "Song Moo Kwan Kong Soo Do ", is one of the Five original kwans (martial art schools) of taekwondo in Korea. Its founder, from 1944, Supreme Grandmaster Byung Jik Ro (1919–2015), was one of the highest ranking taekwondo practitioners in the world, and is considered the "Founder of Modern Taekwondo". As a Shotokan Black Belt under Gichin Funakoshi, Byung Jik Ro created what is commonly known as Song Moo Kwan. While staying largely true to the basic principles of Shotokan Karate Do, he placed more emphasis on kicking techniques within the newly created Taekwondo style. To this day both styles maintain a striking similarity.

== See also ==
- Korean martial arts
- Taekwondo
- Tang Soo Do
