= Embusen =

Kata movement

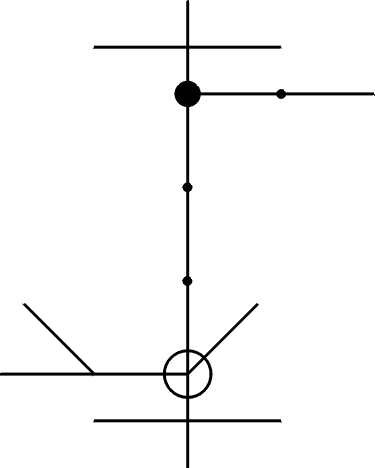
Example of an embusen (Heian Shodan, Shotokan)

Embusen (演武線) is a Japanese term used in martial arts like karate and judo to refer to the spot where a kata begins, as well as its line of movement. Though it is not stressed in Okinawa, nearly all Japanese-influenced kata start and end on exactly the same embusen point (Kiten). This word is also commonly romanized as enbusen.

The embusen line varies for each series of kata. It is always perpendicular to the battle line of an engagement and is the line one travels back and forth in battle. So it is, for example, a straight line for the Shōtōkan Tekki series of kata. It follows the form of a capital letter I for the Heian series of kata, as well as for the Taikyoku series. More advanced kata, such as Shotokan's Kanku-Dai and Gojūshiho Dai and Sho kata, as well as the Gōjū-ryū Seipai and Kururumfa kata, for example, have increasingly more complex embusen to train the practitioner in more advanced defensive angles and footwork. For any kata, the embusen is fixed and must be followed exactly for proper mastery of the style.

== The rule of embusen ==
Japanese kata are mostly arranged to start and end on or around the same point. Many were modified from their original Okinawan versions to accomplish this feat. The purpose of this is simply to allow the movements to be practiced in a small training space. The rule of embusen is that any movements in one direction should be symmetrical and countered by an equivalent number of movements in the opposite direction. In Okinawan karate the maximum number of steps in any direction is normally three.

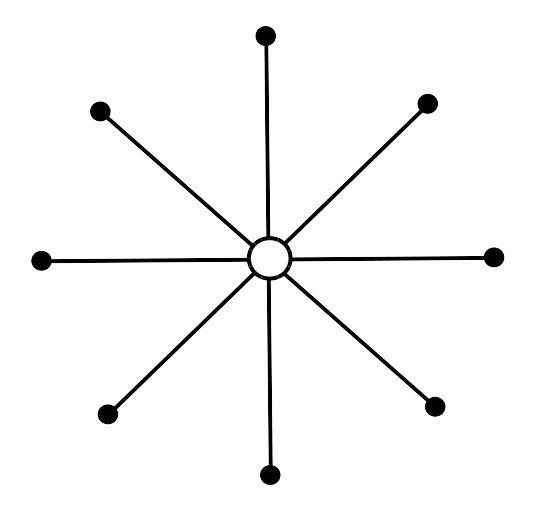
Karate kata will typically proceed along lines of embusen and start and finish on the kiten.
