= American Tang Soo Do =

Hybrid martial art

Tang Soo Do
- Also known as: Karate
- Focus: Hybrid
- Country of origin: USA, based on martial arts techniques from Korea and Japan.
- Date of formation: 1966
- Creator: Hwang Kee
- Famous practitioners: Pat E. Johnson, Bob Wall, Aaron Norris, John Natividad, Howard Jackson, Darnell Garcia, William Zabka, Michele Krasnoo, Bruce Buffer, Danny Bonaduce
- Parenthood: Tang Soo Do (Moo Duk Kwan), Judo, Karate (Shotokan, Shito-ryu)

American Tang Soo Do is a hybrid martial art brought to the US by Shin Jae Chul who was sent to Springfield, NJ by Hwang Kee in the mid-60’s. Tang Soo Do combined the Korean martial art of Tang Soo Do (Moo Duk Kwan) with Japanese styles of Judo, Shito-ryu Karate and Shotokan Karate. Over the years it has been further developed by former black belts of his and their students.

== Development ==
American Tang Soo Do evolved from Tang Soo Do Moo Duk Kwan and it combines elements from several different fighting styles. Between 1958 and 1961 Chuck Norris was stationed in South Korea at Osan Air Base, as a member of the military police in the United States Air Force. During this time he trained in various martial arts styles under some of the most respected instructors in the world. These instructors included Tang Soo Do-Moo Duk Kwan with Shin Jae Chul and Judo under an instructor named "Mr. Ahn".

Upon his return to the United States as a Tang Soo Do black belt Norris continued his martial arts training with Shotokan Karate masters Tsutomu Ohshima and Hidetaka Nishiyama, Shitō-ryū Karate instructor Fumio Demura, American Kenpo Karate founder Ed Parker, and Judo expert Gene LeBell. What resulted from this training in what would become known as American Tang Soo Do. Norris would continue to make changes to his art by adding techniques from Hapkido which he learned via his friendship with Hapkido and Tae Kwon Do master Jun Chong whom he sold one of his schools to in the early 1970s. In the late 1970s Norris would train with the late AL Thomas in Thomas' Budo jujutsu system.

== National Tang Soo Do Congress ==
American Tang Soo Do's original governing body was the National Tang Soo Do Congress (NTC) founded in 1973 by Chuck Norris as its president and Pat E. Johnson as its vice-president and Chief of Instruction after breaking ties with the Moo Duk Kwan. In 1979, Norris dissolved the NTC and formed his current organization the United Fighting Arts Federation (UFAF) and named Johnson as executive vice president. In 1986, Norris promoted Johnson to ninth-degree black belt. At that time due to a philosophical difference of opinion with Norris, Johnson would leave the UFAF and reform the NTC as the governing body for American Tang Soo Do while Norris kept UFAF as the parent organization for his new martial arts system of Chun Kuk Do.

== American Tang Soo Do: Notable Figures ==
| Name | Rank | Title | Note |
|---|---|---|---|
| Chuck Norris | 10th degree black belt | Grand Master | ATSD Founder, Retired as the Undefeated Professional Middleweight Champion in 1974 |
| Dick Douglas | 10th degree black belt | Grand Master | Taught in Las Vegas, NV from 1966 to 2006. Was the NTC Vice President, President and founder of Western Tang Soo Do Federation (WTSDF), died in 2006. |
| John Natividad | 10th degree black belt | Grand Master | International Champion, taught in Las Vegas, NV. |
| Aaron Norris | 10th degree black belt | Grand Master | Brother of Chuck, Producer. Promoted to 10th degree by his brother in 2018. |
| Pat E. Johnson | 10th degree black belt | Grand Master | Creator of Karate Point Scoring System, Fight Coordinator, National & International Champion |
| Robert Wall | 9th degree black belt | Grand Master | Karate Champion, Co-star of Enter the Dragon, Way of the Dragon, and Game of Death |
| Tom Bloom | 10th degree black belt | Grand Master | 5X World Champion & 3X International Champion, featured in Black Belt Magazine for practical application teaching methods, teaches in Westlake Village, CA |
| Johnny Gyro | 9th degree black belt | Grand Master | 7X World Champion, teaches in Oak Park, CA |
| Roger Lacombe | 10th degree black belt | Grand Master | Teaches in Agoura Hills, CA |
| Ron Pohnel | 9th degree black belt | Grand Master | 5X International Karate Champion, Stuntman and actor, teaches in Hawaii |
| Dennis Ichikawa | 9th degree black belt | Grand Master | Founder and current head of the American Tang Soo Do Alliance. Highest rank under Norris was second degree black belt. All other rank was via his own organization. |
| Brian Mable | 10th degree black belt | Grand Master | Current president of the WTSDF; assumed presidency after the passing of Dick Douglas. |
| Kenneth Herrera | 10th degree black belt | Grand Master | U.F.A.F. Instructor of the Year 1986 |
| Steve Smith | 10th degree black belt | Grand Master | |
| Darnell Garcia | 8th degree black belt | Grand Master | Former member of Norris' competition team. Appeared in Enter the Dragon alongside Pat Johnson and Bob Wall |
| Joey Escobar | 8th degree black belt | Grand Master | 13X International Champion, teaches in Malibu, CA |

== Forms ==
American Tang Soo Do includes the practice of forms, (Korean hyung and Japanese kata). The system's forms are taken primarily from Tang Soo Do Moo Duk Kwan, while many of the advanced level forms are from Norris' training with Ki Whang Kim and later modified by Norris. Over the years, some former Norris black belts have gone on to further modify the forms and even introduce new forms to their own curriculums.

=== Basic forms ===
Traditional Korean Tang Soo Do includes three basic forms based on the Taikyoku forms of Shotokan and known as Giecho Hyung in Korean. The first form (Il Bu) still remains the same as the one found in the Korean version, however the second (Yi Bu) and third (Sahm Bu) have been modified. Norris would also two new forms (Sang Gup) to the curriculum.

- Giecho Hyung Il Bu (기초형일부) | Basic Form #1
- Giecho Hyung Il Bu Sang Gup (기초형일부상급) | Basic Form #1 Advanced
- Giecho Hyung Yi Bu (기초형이부) | Basic Form #2
- Giecho Hyung Yi Bu Sang Gup (기초형이부상급) | Basic Form #2 Advanced
- Giecho Hyung Sahm Bu (기초형삼부) | Basic Form #3

=== Intermediate Forms ===
These are forms originating on Okinawa created by Anko Itosu and known as the Pinan in most Japanese and Okinawan systems and Heian in Shotokan.

- Pyong-An Cho Dan (평안초단) | "Peaceful and Calm First Level"
- Pyong-An Yi Dan (평안이단) | "Peaceful and Calm Second Level"
- Pyong-An Sahm Dan (평안삼단) | "Peaceful and Calm Third Level"
- Pyong-An Sa Dan (평안사단) | "Peaceful and Calm Fourth Level"
- Pyong-An Oh Dan (평안오단) | "Peaceful and Calm Fifth Level"

=== Advanced Forms ===
These are forms required for first degree black belt and above. Many individual schools have made minor changes to these forms resulting in slight variations from the original forms taught by Norris. While most of the advanced forms do resemble their Japanese/Korean counterparts, others are unique due to Ki Whang Kim’s Shudokan Karate influence on Norris, most notably Chin Te and Jion.

- Bassai (바싸이) | "Form of the Rock"
- Nianchi Cho Dan (니안치초단) | "Internal Divided Conflict First Level"
- Nianchi Yi Dan (니안치이단) | "Internal Divided Conflict Second Level"
- Nianchi Sahm Dan (니안치삼단) | "Internal Divided Conflict Third Level"
- Ship Su (sometimes spelled Chipsu or Chip Su) (십수) | "10 Hands"
- Yun Bi (윤비) | "Flying Swallow" (Some schools use Wang Shu (완슈) | "Excellent Wrist")
- Chin Te (진태) | "Rare Hand" or "Unusual Hand"
- Jion (지온) | "Temple of Mercy" or "Temple Sound"
- Kong Sang Koon (공상군) | "Viewing the Sky"
- Tae Gi Hyul (大地穴 or 대지혈) | "Warrior's Form" or "Big Earth Hole"
- Ro Hai (로하이) | "Vision of a Crane" or "Vision of a Heron"

=== Miscellaneous Advanced Forms ===
Advanced forms added by individual associations or schools, not part of the original Norris curriculum.

- Bassai-So (바사이소) | "Small form of the Rock"
- Jin Do (진도) | "Fighter to the east"

=== Weapons Forms ===
Just like its Korean counterpart, weapons training was not originally part of the system. Over the years many schools have added weapons training and forms to their curriculum primarily from Okinawan Kobudo. Some schools continue to teach the Okinawan forms while others have gone on to create their own forms.

== Sparring & Fighting ==
=== One-Step & Three-Step Sparring ===
One-step sparring & three-step sparring techniques are choreographed patterns of self-defense moves against the single strike or triple strike of an attack. Practiced in pairs; one partner attacks, often with a single punch or kick, and the other person will perform a series of prearranged techniques, often in a block-strike-sweep sequence. One-Step sparring teaches beginning and intermediate students how to flow from defense to offense in a safe and controlled training environment, while it allows advanced students to train techniques too deadly to use in live sparring such as strikes to the eyes, throat, and groin. Many ATSD schools have added MMA and grappling techniques to this type of training.

=== Free-Sparring ===
American Tang Soo Do free-sparring consists of point matches that are based on the three-point rule (the first contestant to score three points wins) or a two-minute rule (a tally of points over one two-minute round, with lead and rear-leg kicks and lead and rear-arm hand techniques all score equally, one point per technique). Tang Soo Do sparring is a contact event. Though often billed as "light" or "no-contact," the typical level of contact is moderate, being controlled to both the body and head (in dan divisions). Most Tang Soo Do practitioners feel that contact in sparring is essential to understanding proper technique and necessary for developing mental preparedness and a level of relaxation critical to focus performance in stressful situations. Unnecessarily or disrespectfully harming an opponent in Tang Soo Do sparring is not tolerated. Health and longevity of practitioners are major goals of Tang Soo Do practice. Serious injuries are counterproductive because they inhibit a level of physical training that is needed to foster emotional and intellectual growth. However, minor injuries, such as bumps, bruises and the occasional loss of wind may be invaluable experiences. Each match should begin and end with respect, compassion and a deep appreciation for the opponent. Though Tang Soo Do sparring is competitive, traditional matches are more of an exercise, or a way of developing oneself not only physically, but mentally and emotionally as well.

=== MMA & Grappling ===
Many American Tang Soo Do schools have added both MMA training and grappling (Brazilian Jiu-Jitsu, Hapkido, Jujutsu, Judo) to their training programs. This includes everything from live sparring with MMA gloves, and live rolling with submissions; to adding specific self-defense focused techniques to the One-Step Sparring.

== Techniques ==
=== Hand Strikes and Blocks ===
ATSD is a hard style of martial arts consisting of hard blocking techniques and hard striking techniques with the hands. These hand strikes can be employed traditional style with the open hand, or American style with the closed fist as in boxing. The goal of ATSD strike training is to be able to incapacitate an attacker with a multitude of strikes to weak points on the human body.

==== Basic Strikes ====
- Center Punch
- Reverse Punch
- Side Punch
- Ridge Hand
- Knife Hand
- Back Knuckle
- Bottom Fist
- Hammer Fist
- Palm Heel
- Uppercut
- Jab

==== Basic Blocks ====
- Low Block
- High Block
- Knife-Hand Block
- Inside Block
- Outside Block
- Parry Blocks
- Cross Blocks
- Reinforced Blocks
- Universal Block (Inside Parry/Low Block)

=== Kicks & Jump Kicks ===
ATSD is based on 50% punching and 50% kicking techniques, but is most known for its kicking. There are dozens of kicks that can be employed by all angles of attacks, which include hundreds of variations. The jump kicks in this art are based on traditional Korean kicking arts, and are very acrobatic in nature.

==== Basic Kicks ====
- Front Kick (Standing/Slide-up/Stepping)
- Round Kick (Standing/Slide-up/Spinning)
- Side Kick (Standing/Slide-up/Spinning)
- Back Kick (Standing/Stepping/Spinning)

==== Basic Jump Kicks ====
- Jump Front Kick
- Jump Spinning Round Kick
- Jump Spinning Side Kick
- Jumping Side Kick
- Jump Spinning Back Kick
- Butterfly Kick

=== Self-Defense ===
Self-Defense; along with self-control, self-respect, and self-confidence; is one of the main objectives of ATSD. This not only includes a myriad of life-saving techniques based on Karate, Judo, Boxing, and Kickboxing, but training to have a self-defense and self-preservation mindset.

It takes on average 5 years (3 years minimum) of dedicated training to achieve the rank of 1st degree midnight blue belt. Each degree varies depending on dojang. Some follow the time and grade system commonly used by south korean systems. For example, to move from 1st degree midnight blue belt to 2nd degree midnight blue belt takes an additional 2 years of training/teaching minimum, from 2nd degree midnight blue belt to 3rd degree midnight blue belt it takes an additional 3 years of training minimum amount of time to go from 1st degree midnight blue belt to 2nd degree midnight blue belt is 2 years. All ranks 3rd degree midnight blue belt and above are 3 years minimum per degree.

=== American Tang Soo Do Belt System ===
White Belt - Beginner
Yellow Belt - Beginner

7thGup Orange Belt - Beginner

6th Gup Green Belt - Intermediate
5th Gup Green Belt - Intermediate
4th Gup Green Belt - Intermediate
3rd Gup Red Belt - Advanced
2nd Gup Red Belt - Advanced
1st Gup Red Belt - Advanced
Cho Dan Bo Blue Belt - Advanced
1st Degree Black Belt - Instructor
2nd Degree Black Belt - Instructor
3rd Degree Black Belt - Instructor
4th Degree Black Belt - Master
5th Degree Black Belt - Master
6th Degree Black Belt - Master
7th Degree Black Belt - Grand Master
8th Degree Black Belt - Grand Master
9th Degree Black Belt - Grand Master
10th Degree Black Belt - Grand Master

In many schools, yellow belts are often considered as a youth grade inserted between white belt and purple belt. Traditionally in ATSD black belts do not wear stripes on their belts or "special" belts. However, over the course of the years many schools have begun using stripes and "special" uniforms and belts to denote rank. Belt color rankings and systems also vary from school to school.

== Terminology / Korean commands ==
Though Some American Tang Soo Do schools still use Korean terminology for the techniques, most have opted to use the American translations or even Japanese terms such as kumite or kata.

=== Korean Commands (Old Korean Dialect) ===
- Cha Ryut (차류트) | Attention
- Kyung Yet (예경) | Bow
- Choon Bee (춘베) | Ready
- Ba Ro (바로) | Return

== American Tang Soo Do Descendant Arts ==
=== Chuck Norris System (formerly Chun Kuk Do) ===
Chun Kuk Do was founded in 1990 by Chuck Norris and evolved from Chuck Norris' training in Brazilian jiu-jitsu with the Gracie and Machado families and inclusion into his system. Norris had dropped the name "Tang Soo Do" because he believed that he had modified his system so much from its traditional Korean version that he felt it was no longer appropriate to use the name. In July 2015 at Norris' organization's annual convention it was announced that his system would no longer go by "Chun Kuk Do" and would be officially referred to as the "Chuck Norris System". UFAF has also eliminated all but two of the original black belt forms (Kong Sang Koon and Jion) from the syllabus.
