= Robert Cheezic =

American martial artist (1939–2021)

Robert Allen Cheezic
- Born: January 2, 1939; Pittston, Pennsylvania, U.S.
- Died: January 17, 2021 (aged 82); Wolcott, Connecticut, U.S.
- Nationality: USA
- Style: Tang Soo Do (Moo Duk Kwan)
- Teacher: Jae Chul Shin
- Rank: 10th Dan in Tang Soo Do
- Years active: 1959-2021

Other information
- Website: Cheezic Tang Soo Do Federation homepage

Robert Allen Cheezic (January 2, 1939 – January 17, 2021) was an American martial artist specializing in the art of Tang Soo Do. He was a major mover of Tang Soo Do in the Northeastern United States and was the founder of the Cheezic Tang Soo Do Federation, one of the oldest American martial arts organizations focusing on Tang Soo Do.

== Biography ==
=== Early life ===
Robert Allen Cheezic was born on January 2, 1939, in Pittston, Pennsylvania. Aged 5, his family moved to Waterbury, Connecticut.. He attended Leavenworth High School, where he excelled in various sports. Cheezic would also complete vocational training at Connecticut School of Electronics. After graduating, he enrolled to United States Air Force. He spent his first two service years stationed at Stewart Air Force Base in Newburgh, New York.

=== Discovery of Tang Soo Do ===
In 1959, while still in service of USAF, he was deployed to Osan Air Base in South Korea. While deployed there, Cheezic would one day encounter South Korean martial arts master Jae Chul Shin, who was teaching Tang Soo Do (Moo Duk Kwan-style) to American soldiers at the base. Cheezic got intrigued and Shin took him as his student. Amongst Cheezic's martial arts companions under Shin's tutelage were Bob Thompson, and Chuck Norris, with whom he would remain friends, even after end of military service. Cheezic studied under Shin around 1959 to 1960 and received his Black Belt from Hwang Kee in October 1960.

=== Tang Soo Do in America ===
After being discharged from the US Airforce, Cheezic would return to United States. Around that time, he was worked full-time at Anaconda Brass Company and the Atlantic Richfield Company. He would establish his first Tang Soo Do school at the Waterbury Boy's Club. Eventually the group started to get too big for the gymnasium and Cheezic would open his own martial arts studio, the American Tang Soo Do Academy, (Note: Not to be confused with American Tang Soo Do, an individual derivative of Tang Soo Do founded by Chuck Norris.) which, per World Moo Duk Kwan, was the "first ever Tang Soo Do dojang established in the Northeast region of the United States."

Robert Cheezic was an active participant in the 1960s booming Karate scene. Cheezic would take part in various events, performing demonstrations and acting as a judge and participating as a competitor. He would compete well into early 1970s, when he focused on coaching his own students to become Karate competitors instead. These students would take part in Karate competitions and engage in cultural exchange programs internationally.He also created the Cheezic National Karate Teams.

Cheezic established the Cheezic Tang Soo Do Federation in 1971. By 1999, the Cheezic Tang Soo Do Federation consisted of six college-based Tang Soo Do schools, fifty-one domestic branches and four international programs.

According to Black Belt Magazine, the Cheezic Tang Soo Do Federation under Cheezic had trained over 300 black-belt level students in Tang Soo Do by 2002. At the time of his death, Cheezic had promoted over 3000 Black Belts.

Cheezic died from COVID-19 on January 17, 2021, at the age of 82.

== Legacy ==
In 1995, Cheezic and 16 other American martial artists participated at a cultural exchange in Henan Shaolin Temple.

In 2006, was inducted into the Budo International Hall of Fame.

Aside from Tang Soo Do, Robert Cheezic also has a long held association with the Boys & Girls Clubs of America and has served in the organization's board of directors.

== See also ==
- Tang Soo Do
