= Jun Hyeog Lee =

Taekwondo Grandmaster, Jun Lee

Jun Lee
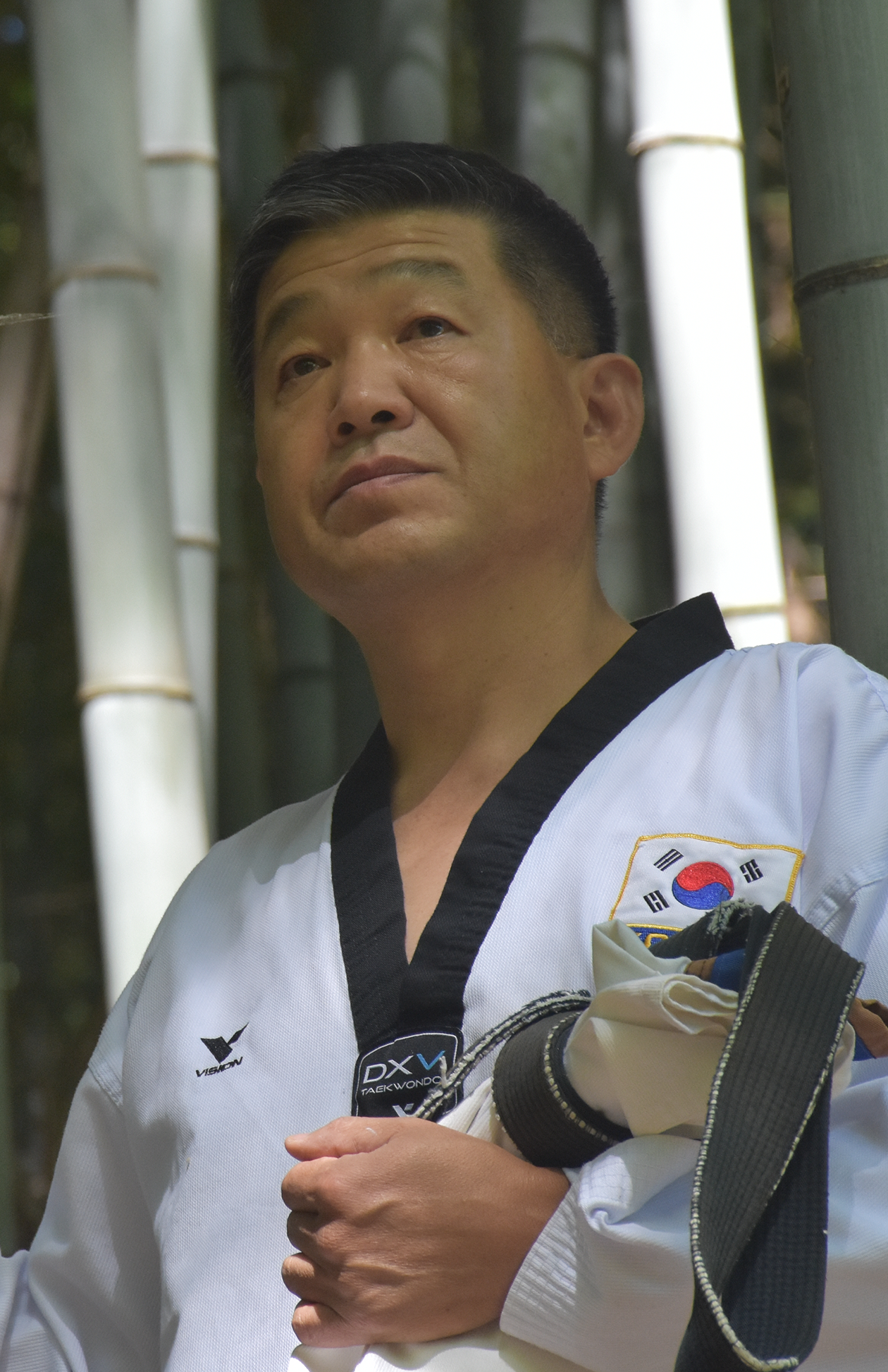
- Grandmaster Jun Lee
- Born: November 17, 1962 (age 63); Ansan, Gochang County, South Korea
- Style: Taekwondo
- Rank: 9th dan

- Jun Hyeog Lee
- Hangul: 이준혁
- Hanja: 李峻爀
- Revised Romanization: I Junhyeok
- McCune–Reischauer: I Chunhyŏk

Nickname
- Hangul: 안산
- Hanja: 安山
- Revised Romanization: Ansan
- McCune–Reischauer: Ansan

Jun Lee is a Korean American Taekwondo Grandmaster 9th dan and the founder of Black Belt World, a Taekwondo school of the Korean Martial Arts. He has been referred to as one of the top ten martial artists in the United States. He holds the world record for breaking 5,000 one-inch thick boards in seven hours. The Kukkiwon named Grandmaster Lee its spokesperson for International affairs on February 22, 2021.

== Early life ==
Jun Lee was born on November 17, 1962, in the village of Ansan, Gochang County in the North Jeolla Province located in the Southwest of the Republic of Korea. He was the third of six sons. His father, Inkyu Lee, was a civil servant and local politician. His mother, Yo Soon Lee, was a housewife.

In middle school, Jun Lee met Master Kang, who was his first Taekwondo master. Master Kang ran the Oh Do Kwan Dojang in Gochang. Jun Lee became one of Kang's top students, earning his black belt at the age of 13.

In the early 1970s with the Vietnam War winding down, many young Korean Taekwondo masters immigrated to the United States, including Jun Lee's older brother, Hyeon Kon Lee. Hyeon Kon Lee opened one of the first Taekwondo dojangs in Virginia.

== Taekwondo activities ==
=== First dojang ===
Jun Lee emigrated to America in 1982. He and his brother Hyeon Lee believed that the Research Triangle area in North Carolina would be an ideal location to open a dojang. The Triangle was a growing area of educated middle to upper-class families, who would be keener on and better able to afford Taekwondo lessons. In February 1987, Jun Lee left Virginia and moved to Raleigh. He opened a dojang there.

=== Teaching philosophy ===
To Jun Lee, Taekwondo was and still is a way to better the person and society as a whole. Taekwondo extends far outside the dojang and into the community where masters and students can contribute to the betterment of all. Jun Lee developed his martial arts philosophy on these principles: 1. to instill loyalty to one's country, 2. to honor to one's parents, 3. to respect for elders, 4. to care for juniors, 5. to build positive relationships with teachers, 6. to treat all things with care, 7. to never seek advantage over the weak, 8. to use Taekwondo to benefit others, and 9. to finishing what you start.

Jun Lee believes that if all people practiced Taekwondo and introduced these qualities and values into their lives, not only would society be better off, but it would be much more liberated. As Jun Lee puts it, "there would not be a need for the laws that govern."

=== Grandmaster's test ===
Master testing for fifth degree and higher dans had always been done behind closed doors. Jun Lee decided to change the tradition. On November 23, 1997, Jun Lee tested for his seventh degree (7th dan) before an audience of his students and Taekwondo Grandmasters. This was the first World Taekwondo sanctioned seventh-degree black conducted in the United States. Grandmaster Jhoon Rhee, Grandmaster Woo Jin Chung, Grandmaster Dong Jin Kim, Grandmaster K.S. Lee, and Grandmaster Won Ik Yi were the examiners. Jun Lee demonstrated his skills in the various Taekwondo disciplines, Poomsae (forms), sparring, board breaking, and demonstration. The highlights of the test were Jun Lee's breaking of a Louisville Slugger bat and his sword demonstration. With a baseball bat held in a special concrete stand, Jun Lee broke the bat with a single kick of his leg. While blindfolded, Master Lee sliced an apple perched on his student's stomach with a traditional Korean sword.

== Politics ==
In 2011, Jun Lee ran for mayor of Knightdale against the incumbent, Russell Killen. He was endorsed by the Democratic party. Jun Lee lost with forty-six percent of the vote.

== Other activities ==
Jun Lee has been president of the International Coalition of Good Health and Good Friends (ICG), a Taekwondo global community service group. He is a former Secretary-General, the United States Taekwondo Committee and was appointed as guest professor for the Departments of Taekwondo at Woo Suk University. He holds an unofficial world record holder for breaking 5000 boards within 7 hours and has been selected as one of Top Ten Martial Arts Masters in the USA by Martial Arts World magazine.
