= Jung Kil Kim =

South Korean taekwondo practitioner

- Born: February 23, 1936 (age 89); Korea
- Other names: Jung Tiger Kim, Tiger Kim
- Style: Taekwondo, Tang Soo Do, Hapkido, Moo Duk Kwan
- Teacher: Hwang Kee
- Rank: 9th dan taekwondo

Other information
- Website: www.tigerkim.com

Jung Kil Kim (born February 23, 1936), also known as Tiger Kim, is a martial arts practitioner. A native of the nation of South Korea, he won numerous titles including the Asian Martial Arts Championship Tournament.

== Early life ==
Kim attended Dongju College and became an instructor at the Tang Soo Do Moo Duk Kwan Headquarters in Korea. He became a captain in the Korean National Police.

== Later life ==
Kim served as the President of the AAU Tae Kwon Do Association, and also the State President of Colorado Taekwondo Association. He received a Presidential Champions Award from President George W. Bush, and he served as president of the Korean Taekwondo Association as late as 2006.

== Media ==
Tiger Kim was on the cover of Official Karate Magazine in October 1980 and Tae Kwon Do Times in November 1985.

== Books ==
He wrote a number of books including WTF Taekwondo Tang Soo Do Forms and The Ultimate Beginners Guide to Martial Arts: The Difference Between The Arts Explained by Industry Professionals.
