= Moo Duk Kwan Taekwondo =

Taekwondo school

Taekwondo
- Country of origin: South Korea
- Founder: Kim Young-taek, Hong Chong-soo, and Lee Kang-ik
- Ancestor arts: Karate, Quanfa

Moo Duk Kwan Taekwondo is a modern Korean martial art formed in April 1965 by Kim Young-taek, Hong Chong-soo, and Lee Kang-ik, after a significant group of former students of Hwang Kee chose to leave the original Moo Duk Kwan organization in order to join the Taekwondo unification movement.

== Meaning ==
- Moo – military, chivalry, martial; within the ideograph the inner part of the symbol is the word for "stop" and the outer part means "weapon"
- Duk – benevolence, virtue, goodness, commanding respect; within the ideograph on the left it means "little steps" or "to happen", and on the right the character means "moral"; thus moral steps or perhaps virtuous conduct
- Kwan – large building, palace, library; again within the ideograph the left part looks like a roofed building and technically means "to eat" (under a roof).

Moo Duk Kwan can therefore be loosely translated to "school of martial virtue"

== History ==
Moo Duk Kwan is the name adopted by Hwang Kee for his martial arts school established in Korea November 9, 1945. Hwang Kee named the first martial art system he taught in his Moo Duk Kwan schools Hwa Soo Do. Later Hwang Kee modified the content of his martial art system and named it Tang Soo Do and eventually he modified his martial art system again and adopted the name Soo Bahk Do to reflect the significant changes incorporated into his system including a new series of hyungs. At the various developments of the art, some of Hwang Kee's students chose to leave the organization, and start new groups in order to keep using the old name of the art and the old curriculum. This has resulted in several different independent groups using the Moo Duk Kwan name for their organizations worldwide, while using different names for their martial art, such as Tang Soo Do, Taekwondo and Soo Bak Do.

The Soo Bak Do branch of Moo Duk Kwan in the US considers themselves to be the true Moo Duk Kwan school, and Moo Duk Kwan and Hwang Kee's fist logo are therefore federally registered trademarks 3,023,145 and 1,446,944 and 3,119,287 of Hwang Kee's licensed successor organizations in the US. However, for the origin of the Taekwondo branch of Moo Duk Kwan, one has to look to Korea.

In 1961 the Korean government initiated a movement to unify all of its country's martial arts schools under one governing body. This body would originally be called the Korean Tae Soo Do Association and later renamed the Korean Tae Kwon Do Association. The stated purpose was to unify the Kwans and allow for growth of this newly named Korean martial art.

"A Modern History of Taekwondo", reprinted records and minutes of the meetings of the Kwan Unity committee indicating that Hwang Kee was upset that he would not lead the unified group.

In March 1965 three of Hwang Kee's senior students, Kim Young-taek, Hong Chong-soo, and Lee Kang-ik, led a significant number of practitioners from Hwang Kee's Moo Duk Kwan schools to join the Tae Kwon Do Kwan Unity Movement and in April 1965 Lee Kang-ik became the president of the new group, which took the name Moo Duk Kwan Taekwondo.

Today, the Moo Duk Hae is a social friendship club that endorses the Kukkiwon curriculum. Every year the Moo Duk Hae has an anniversary celebration in Korea, where members from all over the world attend.

== Present Day ==
Hwang Kee's Moo Duk Kwan schools have been the birthplace of many esteemed martial artists who today promote a multitude of different martial art systems including Tang Soo Do, Soo Bahk Do, Tae Kwon Do and more. Many practitioners with lineage back to Hwang Kee's Moo Duk Kwan schools consider each other as brothers and may attend each other's special events and tournaments. As founder of the 1st Moo Duk Kwan school on November 9, 1945 Hwang Kee is the progenitor of many practitioners worldwide and who express great admiration for him and his achievements in the martial arts.
