= Howard Jackson =

Howard Jackson may refer to:

- Howard Jackson (kickboxer) (1951–2006), American kickboxer
- Howard W. Jackson (1877–1960), mayor of Baltimore
- Howard Jackson (composer) (1900–1966), American film composer
- Howard Jackson (runner), winner of the 1988 and 1990 4 × 800 meter relay at the NCAA Division I Indoor Track and Field Championships
