= Midnight blue belt =

Dan rank belt in some Korean martial arts

A midnight blue belt is a belt worn in some Korean martial arts to signify that the wearer has attained dan rank, which translates to a degree holder. This belt is most commonly seen in the Korean martial arts of tang soo do and soo bahk do, where it is often used in place of the more common black belt. Its origin lies in Hwang Kee, who used it to denote dan holders in the Soo Bahk Do Moo Duk Kwan. In tang soo do, black is viewed as a colour that does not become darker, and thus signifies an end (death), whereas midnight blue represents more positive concepts, such as the element of water.
