= Korean Karate =

Korean Karate can refer to:

- Taekwondo
- Tang Soo Do
- Kyokushin
