= Gim Jeonggil =

Gim Jeonggil (Korean: 김정길) may refer to:

- Jung Kil Kim (born 1936), Korean-born martial arts practitioner
- Kim Jung-gil (born 1986), South Korean para table tennis player

== See also ==
- Kim Jong-gil (1926–2017), South Korean poet
