= Fight School =

- Starring: Simon Lau (Grand Master); Clive Elliott (Shifu); Nathan Lewis (Shifu); Becky Riggs (Shifu)
- Narrated by: Lee Boardman
- Country of origin: United Kingdom
- Original language: English
- No. of series: 1
- No. of episodes: 8

Production
- Running time: 60 mins (including adverts)
- Production company: Granada Television

Original release
- Network: Sky One
- Release: 19 September – 21 November 2002

Fight School is a British reality television series broadcast between 19 September and 21 November 2002. It was made by Granada Television for Sky One.

Filmed in China, it followed a group of martial arts practitioners through a variety of stamina and endurance tasks to determine a winner. Each week one contestant was eliminated after a mixed martial arts bout.

The Fight School contestants were (in eviction order) Andrew Spink, Dominica Oatley, Susan Reilly, Danny Ho, Alex Campbell (left through injury), Don Klass, Alex Hart (known as Allie), M Saville, Toby Russell (replaced Alex Campbell), Emma Ashford and Paul Bernard (winner)

One of the contestants, Don Klass, is the brother of television personality and musician Myleene Klass. The eventual winner was Master Paul Bernard who is World Kickboxing Champion. M Saville recently took part in the newly revamped Gladiators show on Sky One as one of the contestants. Andrew Spink, Alex Hart, M Saville and Paul Bernard all run Martial Arts schools around the uk.

A second series was planned but was cancelled pre-production because of the SARS outbreak which affected South China in 2002–2003.

== Contestants ==
The 11 fighters competing were:

Contestant	Age	Hometown	Fighting Style	Place Finished
Andrew	21	Devon	Tae Kwon Do	11th
Domenica	29	South West	Kickboxing	10th
Susan	27	Liverpool	Tae Kwon Do	9th
Alex	19	Southampton	Kickboxing	8th (withdrew)
Danny	24	Newcastle	Kung Fu	7th
Don	20	London	Wushu	6th
Allie	25	London	Karate	5th
M	21	Manchester	Soo Bahk Do	4th
Toby	18	Buckinghamshire	Tae Kwon Do	3rd
Emma	21	Bristol	Kung Fu	Runner-up
Paul	27	Surrey	Kickboxing	Winner
