= Howard Jackson (kickboxer) =

American kickboxer and boxer (1951–2006)

- Born: 27 June 1951; Detroit, Michigan, U.S.
- Died: 7 March 2006 (aged 54); Duarte, California, U.S.
- Style: Chun Kuk Do, Kickboxing, Muay Thai, Tang Soo Do, Karate, Boxing
- Teachers: Harold Williams, Chuck Norris, Pat E. Johnson
- Rank: 7th degree black belt in Chun Kuk Do; Black belt in Shotokan Karate; Black belt in Tang Soo Do; Black prajied in Muay Thai

Professional boxing record
- Total: 20
- Wins: 12
- By knockout: 6
- Losses: 7
- By knockout: 2
- Draws: 1

Kickboxing record
- Total: 26
- Wins: 23
- By knockout: 12
- Losses: 2
- Draws: 1

Other information
- Website: www.howardjackson.net

Howard E. Jackson (June 27, 1951 – March 7, 2006), nicknamed "California Flash", was an American professional kickboxer and boxer, martial artist, actor, and stunt performer. He was the WKA World Full-Contact Welterweight Champion from 1980 to 1984.

== Biography ==
=== Early life and training ===
Jackson was born in 1951 in Detroit, Michigan, the oldest of four children; two brothers died violent deaths, and his parents died early as well, leaving only Howard and his sister Corliss. He began studying Kung Fu in 1967, switching to Tang Soo Do soon after, and earning his black belt in 1970 from Hwang Kee. According to Paul Maslak in the November, 1984 issue of Official Karate Magazine, Jackson originally received his black belt in Tang Soo Do from Harold Williams. However, he later retested under Chuck Norris.

He began his point fighting career while serving in the U.S. Marine Corps. His speed earned him the nickname "California Flash". In 1973 he won every major tournament on the karate circuit making him the sport's biggest money-winner on record at that time, as well as being the first African-American fighter to be ranked number one in the United States. He frequently trained with such individuals as Norris, Bob Wall, and Pat E. Johnson. Later, Joe Lewis was a great influence on his fighting style.

=== Kickboxing ===
In 1974, Jackson was invited to participate in the first PKA world Full-contact championship promoted by Mike Anderson and Don and Judy Quine. It was celebrated in The Los Angeles Arena on September 14. Jackson was one of four elite American fighters invited to the event, along with Jeff Smith, Bill Wallace, and Joe Lewis.

Jackson, as well as his fellow Americans, was the overwhelming favorite in the Light-Weight division, where he fought Dominican Tae-Kwon-Do fighter, Ramón Smith, who had been invited to the tournament with a two-week notice as a replacement for Mexican José Luis Olivares.

In what commentators labeled 'The Upset of the decade', Ramón Smith defeated Howard Jackson on points in a very explosive fight. This loss was singularly significant, since it prevented the Americans from winning all four categories. After the fight, Jackson alleged that he had gone into the fight with a hurt knee.

Following a 1974 knee injury that sidelined him for two years, he returned in 1976, now as a full-contact fighter.

In kickboxing, Jackson defeated among others, Ricci Wynn, Miguel Sanders, Sam Montgomery, Ray McCallum, Jerry Galarza, Tabata, and Toshio Arima to become the 1980 number one world contender in both the WKA and the PKA. In March, 1980 on NBC-TV, Jackson defeated Japan's Yoshimitsu Tamashiro to win the WKA World Welterweight Championship.

In 1981, Jackson went to Tokyo, Japan and knocked out Masayo Chiba to win the WKBA World Muay Thai Championship. In a non-title bout, Jackson decisioned Joe Marciano who was 12–1.

On April 21, 1984, Jackson lost his WKA title to Andre Brilleman by 12-round decision. Following his defeat, Jackson retired from competition with a 23-2-1 (12 knockouts) record. and

=== Boxing ===
Jackson made his professional boxing debut in August 1977, in a winning bout against Genaro Gloria. He won the Nevada State Welterweight Championship in March 1979 against Jimmy Jackson, but dropped the title a month later to Larry Bonds. He was at one-time the sixth-ranked World Boxing Association (WBA) boxer in his class. His final bout was a losing effort to Ace Rusevski in March 1982. His final record was 12-7-1 (6 knockouts).

=== Film and television work ===
Jackson worked as a bodyguard and personal trainer for Chuck Norris and as a bodyguard for The Temptations, as well as doing seminars. He has appeared in a number of films and TV shows (often courtesy of Norris), both as an actor and as a fight coordinator and stuntman.

== Personal life ==
Jackson had three children: Howard Jr., a detective with the LAPD; Jeremy, a minor-league hockey player in Canada (Western Hockey League), and hip-hop artist; and Amber, a visual arts teacher.

=== Illness and death ===
Jackson was diagnosed with leukemia in February 2002, and died March 7, 2006, at 11:36 am at the City of Hope hospital in Duarte, California.

== Filmography ==
| Year | Title | Role | Notes |
|---|---|---|---|
| 1975 | Dolemite | Fighter | |
| 1979 | Cheng fa | | |
| 1979 | Disco Godfather | Special Karate Fighter | |
| 1984 | Furious | Howard | |
| 1985 | Code of Silence | Officer Johnson | |
| 1985 | Invasion U.S.A. | Street Person | |
| 1986 | The Delta Force | Ed, U.S. Navy Diver (Passenger) | |
| 1987 | Deathrow Gameshow | Spaz Terryton | |
| 1988 | Braddock: Missing in Action III | U.S. Helicopter Pilot #2 | |
| 1992 | Out for Blood | Crack House Enforcer | |
| 1993 | Full Contact | Daniels, Pep's Brother | |
| 1994 | Red Sun Rising | Mercenary Lieutenant | |
| 1994 | Bloodfist VI: Ground Zero | Becker | |
