= Kyung-sun =

- Hangul: 경선
- RR: Gyeongseon
- MR: Kyŏngsŏn

Kyung-sun, also spelled Kyung-seon or Kyong-son, is a Korean given name.

People with this name include:

- Hong Kyong-son (born 1925), one of South Korea's unconverted long-term prisoners who was resettled to North Korea in 2000
- Shin Kyung-sun (born 1933), South Korean male taekwondo practitioner
- Suh Kyungsun (born 1942), South Korean female composer
- Noh Kyung-sun (born 1964), South Korean male wrestler
- Jin Kyung-sun (born 1980), South Korean male football player
- Hwang Kyung-seon (born 1986), South Korean female taekwondo practitioner

== See also ==
- List of Korean given names
