= World Tang Soo Do Association =

- WTSDA
- Membership: 160,000+
- Founded: 1968 by Jae Chul Shin
- Headquarters: Burlington, North Carolina
- Chairman: William Strong

Official website
- worldtangsoodo.com
- Named after the Tang dynasty

The World Tang Soo Do Association is an international Tang Soo Do association headquartered in Burlington, North Carolina. As of 1996, the organization claimed to have over 160,000 members.

== Etymology ==
"Tang Soo Do" (당수도) is the Korean pronunciation of the Hanja 唐手道 (pronounced Táng shǒu dào in Chinese), and translates literally to "The Way of the Tang Hand." The first character of the Hanja form is 唐, referring to the Tang dynasty of China (618-907). In the early 1930s, roughly 55 years after the Imperial Japanese occupation of Okinawa, Gichin Funakoshi in collaboration with others changed the first character to 空, signifying "empty"; both characters can be pronounced "kara" in Japanese, though 唐 is more commonly rendered as "Tou". The Chinese pronunciation of 空手道 is kōng-shǒu-dào, and the Korean is pronounced [koŋsʰudo](공수도). Outside of the Far East, the term "Tang Soo Do" has been synonymous with the Korean martial arts style promoted by grandmaster Hwang Kee; who learned martial arts in Manchuria.

== History ==
In 1968, Master Jae Chul Shin traveled to the United States as a representative of the Korean Tang Soo Do Association, where he then established the United States Tang Soo Do Association. In 1982, dissatisfied with the direction that the organization was headed, Shin resigned from the board of directors and with Ki Yun Yi and William D. Clingan, founded the World Tang Soo Do Association. This coincided with his instructor, Kwang Chang Nim (grandmaster) Hwang Kee's release of new hyungs (forms) which also occurred the same year.
