= Shin Jae-chul =

Korean martial artist

Jae-chul Shin
- Born: 20 December 1936; Seoul, Korea, then part of the Empire of Japan
- Died: 9 July 2012 (aged 75); Burlington, North Carolina, U.S.
- Nationality: South Korean
- Style: Tang Soo Do
- Teachers: Hwang Kee, Oh Se Jun
- Rank: 9th degree black belt
- Years active: 1948-2012

Other information
- Notable students: Chuck Norris, Robert Cheezic, Mujahid Khan
- Website: WTSDA Official Site

- Shin Jae-chul
- Hangul: 신재철
- RR: Sin Jaecheol
- MR: Sin Chaech'ŏl

Jae-chul Shin (Korean: 신재철; 20 December 1936 – 9 July 2012) was a Korean martial artist and founder of the World Tang Soo Do Association.

== Biography ==
Jae-chul Shin began his study of martial arts in 1948, joining the Seoul Moo Duk Kwan Central Gym under Grandmaster Hwang Kee, the founder of the Moo Duk Kwan system. By the time he was a first dan black belt, he had started his teaching career as an assistant instructor at the central gym.

Shin continued to study Tang Soo Do while attending Korea University, where he would earn both his bachelor's and master's degrees in political science. While a student, Shin began teaching at the university, along at the Seoul Central YMCA, other colleges, and many police and military institutions.

In 1958, Shin was drafted into the South Korean air force as a martial arts instructor. During this time he began teaching many American soldiers martial arts. He was stationed at Osan Air Base. One of those servicemen was Carlos Ray “Chuck” Norris.

By the time he completed his master's degree in 1968, Shin had been instructing students in Tang Soo Do throughout Korea for almost 20 years. That same year at the request and sponsorship of Norris, Shin came to the United States to continue graduate studies at Rutgers University and extend his instruction to foreign students as a representative for the Korean Soo Bahk Do Association.

Shin established the U.S. Tang Soo Do Federation in 1968 at his first school in Burlington, New Jersey. In 1982, dissatisfied with the direction that the federation was going, Shin resigned from the board of directors and along with Ki-yun Yi, Sang-kyu Shim and William D. Clingan founded the World Tang Soo Do Association. Grandmaster Shin's decision to leave Moo Duk Kwan coincided with Grandmaster Hwang Kee's release of the new Soo Bahk Do forms in 1982.

Shin remained the leader of the World Tang Soo Do Association until his death on 9 July 2012. Before he died he was responsible for the training and certification of 20,000 black belts and 500 masters. Since then the body has over 200,000 members including more than 50,000 black belts and 300 master instructors in 38 countries. He was the author of several books on Tang Soo Do and featured in a chapter of the 1971 book, 20th century Warriors: Prominent Men in the Oriental Fighting Arts".

In March 2010, the association's board of directors approved Shin's promotion to ninth-degree black belt. In July 2010, Shin was formally promoted to the rank at the association's annual world championships after 27 years as an eighth degree.

Shin died in his sleep on 9 July 2012 in Burlington, North Carolina, U.S., after a period of illness.
