= Code of Silence (1985 film) =

1985 film by Andrew Davis

- Theatrical release poster
- Directed by: Andrew Davis
- Screenplay by: Michael Butler; Dennis Shryack; Mike Gray
- Story by: Michael Butler; Dennis Shryack
- Produced by: Raymond Wagner
- Starring: Chuck Norris; Henry Silva; Bert Remsen; Molly Hagan
- Cinematography: Frank Tidy
- Edited by: Christopher Holmes; Peter Parasheles
- Music by: David Michael Frank
- Production company: Orion Pictures
- Distributed by: Orion Pictures
- Release date: May 3, 1985
- Running time: 100 minutes
- Country: United States
- Language: English
- Budget: $7 million
- Box office: $20,345,561

Code of Silence is a 1985 American action thriller film directed by Andrew Davis and starring Chuck Norris, along with Henry Silva, Molly Hagan, Bert Remsen, and Dennis Farina. Norris portrays Chicago police detective Eddie Cusack, who is caught in a war between rival mob families after a botched sting operation, and must protect a gangster’s daughter. Meanwhile, he is ostracized by his own department for refusing to hold to the blue wall of silence.

Originally written as a potential fourth Dirty Harry film, the screenplay by Michael Butler and Dennis Shryack passed through multiple hands before being purchased by Orion Pictures. After several high-profile actors turned down the lead role, Chuck Norris was cast, marking a departure from his usual martial arts films and helping to legitimize his career. The production, directed by Chicago native Davis, was filmed extensively on location in the city, showcasing several local landmarks.

The film was released on May 3, 1985. Code of Silence received generally positive reviews and was a commercial success, helping cement Norris’ status as a serious action star. Andrew Davis credited the success of the film for turning him into an action film director.

== Plot ==
In Chicago's Uptown, Police Sergeant Eddie Cusack leads a sting operation to bust Colombian cocaine traffickers led by Luis Comacho. The plan is derailed when gunmen disguised as painters, led by mafioso "Crazy" Tony Luna, ambush the exchange. Several Colombians are killed, Cusack's partner Dorato is injured, and two of Luna's men die. Amid the chaos, aging cop Cragie kills an unarmed bystander and plants a gun to fake self-defense. He is put on leave pending a hearing.

Fearing retaliation, Luna flees and asks his associate Lou Gamiani to protect his artist daughter, Diana. Cusack, who refuses to sign a petition clearing Cragie, is shunned by fellow officers and stuck with Cragie's rookie partner, Nick Kopalas, who witnessed the gun-planting but will not testify.

The Comachos retaliate, massacring Luna’s family while disguised as food vendors. Gamiani is killed trying to stop Diana's kidnapping, but Cusack saves her in a dramatic chase through an L train. He hides Diana in a safe house with retired cop Ted Pirelli, his late father's former partner.

At Cragie’s hearing, Cusack testifies he cannot comment on the incident as he arrived after it occurred. However, it is revealed Cusack once filed for Cragie's transfer. Other officers accuse him of breaking the "code of silence," leaving only Dorato as his ally.

When Pirelli is killed and Diana abducted, Cusack storms the Comacho hangout alone after his backup call is ignored. He is overpowered but learns from Luis that Tony Luna’s return to Chicago is imminent. Luis threatens Diana’s life unless Luna is handed over.

Dorato tips off Cusack about Luna’s location. A chase ensues, ending in Luna’s death. With no other options, Cusack retrieves the Prowler, an armed police drone, and launches an assault on the Comacho hideout. Other officers criticize his rogue actions until Kopalas exposes Cragie’s misconduct.

Cusack defeats the Comachos and saves Diana from Luis, killing him just in time. Backup finally arrives, and Cusack ensures Diana’s safety. His commander asks if he will report for duty the next day, and Cusack, having regained his peers' respect, agrees.

== Cast ==
- Chuck Norris as Det. Sgt. Eddie Cusack
- Henry Silva as Luis Comacho
- Bert Remsen as Commander Kates
- Molly Hagan as Diana Luna
- Mike Genovese as "Crazy" Tony Luna
- Nathan Davis as Felix Scalese
- Joe Guzaldo as Det. Nick Kopalas
- Allen Hamilton as Ted Pirelli
- Ron Henriquez as Victor Comacho
- Dennis Farina as Det. Dorato
- Ralph Foody as Det. Cragie
- Ron Dean as Det. Brennan
- Joe Kosala as Lt. Kobas
- Wilbert Bradley as "Spider"
- Gene Barge as Det. Music
- Mario Nieves as Pompas
- Miguel A. Nino as Efren
- Ronnie Barron as "Doc"
- Lou Damiani as Lou Gamiani
- Nydia Rodriguez Terracina as Partida
- Howard Jackson as Officer Johnson
- Alex Stevens as Angel
- John Mahoney as Prowler representative
- Dennis Cockrum and Zaid Farid as Stick-up men
- Robert Wall as Thug (uncredited)

== Production ==
The screenplay by Michael Butler and Dennis Shryack was originally intended as a fourth entry in the Dirty Harry series. When Warner Bros. passed on the script, it changed hands several times before being purchased by Orion Pictures in 1983. The producers reportedly paid $800,000 for rights to the script. The lead role was first offered to Kris Kristofferson, but he passed due to schedule conflicts. Several other actors passed on the part, including Jeff Bridges, Charles Bronson, Harrison Ford, Tommy Lee Jones, Jon Voight and Kurt Russell.

On August 14, 1984, it was announced a film would be made starring Chuck Norris, set in Chicago. At the time, the project was an atypical one for Norris, who was known for his roles in martial arts films. Norris later credited the film with helping legitimize his film career.

This was the first film for Molly Hagan, who had just finished drama school. She later recalled when shooting a scene after her character's family had been wiped out Norris thought his character should not hug or comfort her. Hagan said he should because "if you don’t, you’re an asshole." This caused tension and Davis said Hagan had to apologize because "Mr. Norris really identifies with his character... So I go out and apologize to Chuck Norris. He just looked at me like I was insane. I thought he was still really nice to me... I think part of the problem was that I was really young and who the fuck am I to tell anyone? I don’t think it's necessarily that he was a star. He's a very nice man, and he was terrific on the set. I think I had this attitude that was really not appropriate."

Dennis Farina was an actual Chicago police officer during the making of this film, moonlighting before becoming a full-time actor when cast in the leading role of Michael Mann's 1986 television series Crime Story. Farina knew Davis' father Nate "so I felt very comfortable with Andy", he later said. "There was that Chicago connection where I knew he wasn't gonna lead me astray. He treated me so kindly because he knew I was a novice and kind of watched after me. And Chuck Norris was just a delight to work with, a hell of a nice guy. That film was a nice break for me."

Director Andrew Davis said, "Chuck was easy to work with and very supportive," he recalls. "I think he's proud of the movie, and it was a big hit. It also put me into the world of being an action director, which I guess I'm considered even though I've also done other kinds of movies."

Filming took place on-location in locations around Chicago. Andrew Davis, a Chicago native, insisted on keeping as much of the production inside the city as possible.

== Reception ==
=== Box office ===
The film was released by Orion Pictures in early May 1985. It debuted at number 1 with an opening weekend total of $5,512,461.

According to Film Comment the film earned $8.9 million by the end of the year.

The film went on to gross a total of $20,345,361, making it the second most successful Chuck Norris vehicle at the time, behind Missing in Action (1984).

=== Critical reception ===
The film received generally positive reviews. Review aggregator Rotten Tomatoes retrospectively collected 20 reviews and judged 68% of them to be positive, with an average rating of 6.1/10. Metacritic gave the film a score of 64% based on reviews from 6 critics.

Vincent Canby of The New York Times gave the move a rave review and praised Norris' performance and saying "it could well prove to be his breakout picture". He also felt the film was well directed and written with, a strong supporting cast.

The Variety staff described it as a predictable "cacophonous cops-and-crooks yarn that is actually quite good for the type."

Roger Ebert, in his Chicago Sun-Times review of May 3, 1985, wrote: "This is a heavy-duty thriller, a slick, energetic movie with good performances and a lot of genuine human interest ... a stylish urban action picture with sensational stunts." He gave the film three-and-a-half stars of four. In Ebert's 1988 review for Above the Law, also directed by Davis, he declared Code of Silence "remains the best movie Chuck Norris ever has made and contains the best use of Chicago locations I’ve seen."

Janet Maslin's review in The New York Times on the same day alluded to the film being "Norris's bid for a wider audience, and it succeeds to a considerable degree."

Gene Siskel in the Chicago Tribune also praised the film, writing: "Chuck Norris takes a big leap in his film career with Code of Silence ... it's been a long time between cop pictures that have any kind of gritty feel. Clint Eastwood's last two Dirty Harry films were cartoonish by comparison."

Chris Bumbray of JoBlo.com felt it was that if it "had it been made as a Dirty Harry movie, it likely would have been one of the best." He felt "is strikingly good for a Norris movie, thanks mostly to the script and Davis’s direction, but also, and I gotta hand it to him, Norris’s low-key performance." His final verdict is that "Davis gives the movie a lot of gritty atmosphere and uses Norris better than any director has before or since. He’s not cracking wise or striking action movie poses. He plays his character like a regular guy and he’s a lot more like Steve McQueen here than someone like Schwarzenegger."

David Fear of Rolling Stone said "it works as both a straight cop drama, a crime thriller, and a martial arts-adjacent action flick, and Norris knows how to play the character for maximum effect."

Casey Chong of Flickering Myth wrote that it is "one of the best action movies that Norris has ever played, combining his signature tough-guy persona with a surprisingly better-than-expected acting prowess. The latter is especially true, thanks to Andrew Davis’ assured direction in bringing out the best in his actors."

On the acclaim, Norris said "I really appreciate the acclaim, I've worked hard these last nine years to get critics to look at me in a different light. They're usually more concerned with things like Passage to India, and they've hit me hard all these years, especially in the beginning. I'm really excited, to say the least."

=== Year-end lists ===
The film is recognized by American Film Institute in these lists:

- 2001: AFI's 100 Years...100 Thrills – Nominated

== See also ==
- List of American films of 1985
- Chuck Norris filmography
