= Robert Wall =

American martial artist (1939–2022)

- Born: Robert Alan Wall; August 22, 1939; San Jose, California, U.S.
- Died: January 30, 2022 (aged 82); Los Angeles, California, U.S.
- Nationality: American
- Style: Karate, Tang Soo Do
- Teachers: Bruce Lee, Chuck Norris, Joe Lewis, Gene LeBell, Machado Brothers
- Rank: 9th degree black belt in Tang Soo Do; 8th degree black belt in Kyokushin Budokai

Other information
- Spouse: Lillian Wall (m. 1968)
- Children: Shana Wall
- Website: http://www.worldblackbelt.com/

Robert Alan Wall (August 22, 1939 – January 30, 2022) was an American actor and martial artist.

== Early life ==
Wall was born on August 22, 1939, in San Jose, California, to Ray Wall, a construction worker and Reva (Wingo) Wall, a nurse. While in high school, he took up wrestling. Wall attended San Jose State University on a scholarship, and later moved to southern California.

== Career ==
=== Training ===
Wall studied Okinawan martial arts under Gordon Doversola. In 1966, he, along with karate champion Joe Lewis, opened the Sherman Oaks Karate Studio in Sherman Oaks, California. In 1968, Lewis sold his share of the studio to Chuck Norris. Robert Wall featured in a number of films, most notably three appearances with Bruce Lee: the 1972 film The Way of the Dragon, as O'Hara in Enter the Dragon in 1973, and Game of Death (although he only appeared with Bruce’s stunt double), Bruce Lee's incomplete film re-cut in 1978. He has small roles in Norris films, such as Code of Silence (1985), Firewalker (1986), and Hero and the Terror (1988).

Wall studied several arts under many notable masters. They included Judo under Gene LeBell, Okinawan Shorin-Ryu under Joe Lewis, and Brazilian Jiu-Jitsu under the Machado Brothers.

=== Conflict with Steven Seagal ===
Wall was particularly famous for his public rivalry with Steven Seagal, which provoked a series of challenges between the two between 1988 and 1992. It started when Seagal made disparaging comments about Bruce Lee, Chuck Norris, and other American martial artists in interviews, culminating in two articles in the Black Belt magazine where he claimed he would fight to the death anybody who believed they could defeat him.

Indignant at Seagal's slights of Lee and American martial artists, as well as offended by his boasts, Wall gathered a group of martial artists willing to answer the challenge, who were nicknamed the "Dirty Dozen" in a reference to the 1967 war film The Dirty Dozen. The group included Benny Urquidez, Bill Wallace, Howard Jackson, Roger Carpenter, Allen Steen, Jim Harrison, Dennis Alexio, Richard Norton, Billy Robertson, Pat Burleson, and William "Blinky" Rodriguez, with Gene LeBell and Gerard Finot as potential members and Karyn Turner as a possible promoter for one or more matches.

The Dirty Dozen were controversial in the martial arts community, with some deriding them as an overreaction and a promotion of violence. LeBell later revealed the affair was hurting him professionally and forced him to withdraw, while Urquidez and Burleson became reportedly unhappy with the group's concept. However, several other members claimed to be content with the campaign alone, with Rodriguez declaring, "just by not accepting the challenge, Seagal tells us where he's at."

=== Other work ===
In 2009, Wall starred as a bodyguard in the film Blood and Bone.

== Personal life and death ==
Wall was a 9th degree black belt under Chuck Norris and the co-founder and CEO of a martial arts organization known as World Black Belt Inc. In 1975, Wall authored the book Who's Who in the Martial Arts and Directory of Black Belts (Library of Congress Catalog Card No. 75-2280), the first book of its kind for martial artists.

He died in Los Angeles on January 30, 2022, at the age of 82.

== Filmography ==
=== Films ===
Year	Title	Role	Notes
1972	The Way of the Dragon	Tom/Fred	While the film refers to his character as Tom, the end credits name his character as Fred.
1973	Enter the Dragon	O'Hara	
1974	Black Belt Jones	Mob Henchmen	Uncredited
1978	Game of Death	Carl Miller	
1981	Enter the Ninja	Thug	Uncredited
1985	Code of Silence	Thug	Uncredited
1985	Invasion U.S.A.	Vince	Uncredited
1986	Firewalker	Jose	
1988	Hero and the Terror	Wall	
1992	Sidekicks	Bob Wall	
2004	Sci-Fighter	Las Vegas announcer	
2009	Blood and Bone	O'Hara	
2013	Speed Demon	Car Salesman	Short
2018	Anatomy of An Antihero 3	Master Bob	
2020	The Search for Count Dante		
2020	Anatomy of an Antihero: Redemption	Master Wall	
2021	The Emissaries Movie	Physics Research / Exploration Team Captain	

=== Television ===
Year	Title	Role	Notes
1994–2001	Walker, Texas Ranger	Sheriff Rivers / Sheriff Rivers / Announcer / Battalion Chief / Customs Official / Gorch Man St. / Chico / Carlos / Hood / Security Guard / Billy / Billy/ Referee / Bob Wall / Fisk	15 episodes
1995	Family Matters	Bob Wall	1 episodes
