= Dong Jin Kim =

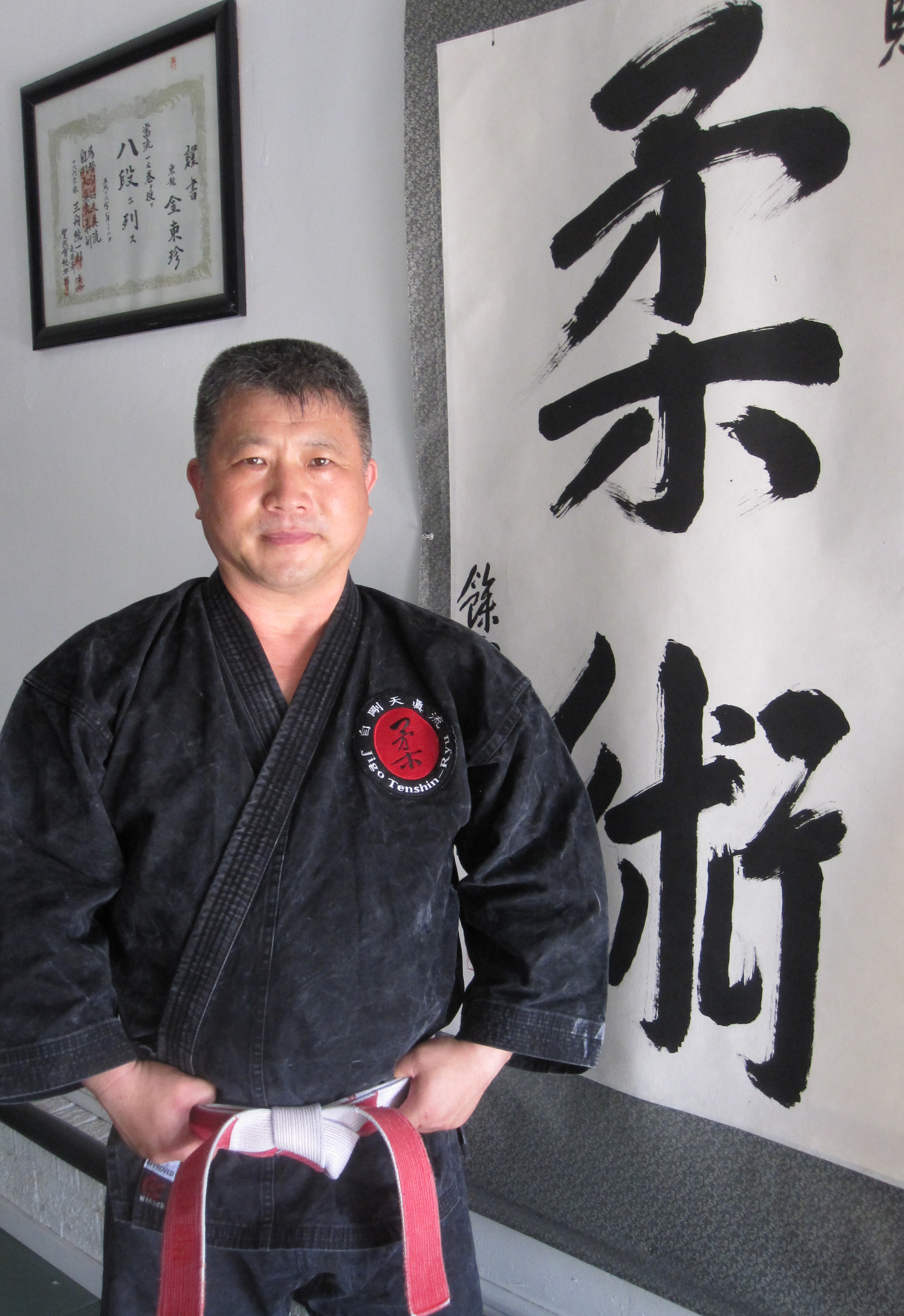
- Born: February 20, 1957; Pusan, South Korea
- Died: February 21, 2015 (aged 58)
- Style: JTR Jujutsu, Kendo, Hapkido, Tang Soo Do
- Rank: 9th Dan Black Belt in Hapkido - Korea Kido Association; 8th Dan Black Belt in Jujutsu - Japan Jigo Tenshin-Ryu Jujutsu Seibukan Association; 7th Dan Black Belt in Kendo - Japan Tokyo-Shudokan; 5th Dan Black Belt in Tang Soo Do - International Tang Soo Do Federation; 8th Dan Black Belt in Jujutsu - Dai Nippon Butoku Kai (Hanshi title); 8th Dan Black Belt in Kendo - Dai Nippon Butoku Kai (Hanshi title)

Other information
- Website: JTR Jujutsu; Dai Nippon Butoku Kai(DNBK)

Dong Jin Kim (February 20, 1957 — February 21, 2015) was a Korean American martial artist who primarily studied and taught jujutsu, Hapkido, and Kendo. He was the founder of the JTR Jujutsu martial art. Grand Master Kim held a 9th Dan black belt in Hapkido, as certified by Korea Kido Association, an 8th Dan black belt in jujutsu, as certified by Japan Jigo Tenshin-Ryu Jujutsu Seibukan Association, a 7th Dan black belt in Kendo, as certified by Japan Tokyo-Shudokan, and a 5th Dan black belt Tang Soo Do, as certified by the International Tang Soo Do Federation.

Dong Jin Kim was a member of Dai Nippon Butoku Kai (DNBK) 大日本武徳会 (lit. "Greater Japan Martial Virtue Society"). Under the DNBK, he received a postmortem rank of 8 Dan in Jujutsu and the Hanshi Title. He also held a rank of 8 Dan in Kendo and the Hanshi Title.

== Biography ==
Dong Jin Kim was born in Pusan, South Korea. Kim had over 48 years of experience in martial arts. At ten years of age Kim began training in Tang Soo Do, Hapkido, and Kendo. He was also master in the Japanese art of Jujutsu.

From 1976 through 1984, Kim instructed Kendo in Pusan at the City Prison, Pusan Police Department, and at the De-Wan-Kwan Kumdo School and continued his studies in Kendo under Grand Master Do Hoo Moon. At this time, Kim also received a degree in Physical Education from the College of Physical Education at the Incheon National College. In 1985, Kim moved to Japan. Kim continued his studies in Kendo at the Tokyo Shudokan Kendo School. At this time he also began training in Japanese Jujutsu at the Japan Jujutsu Tokyo School.

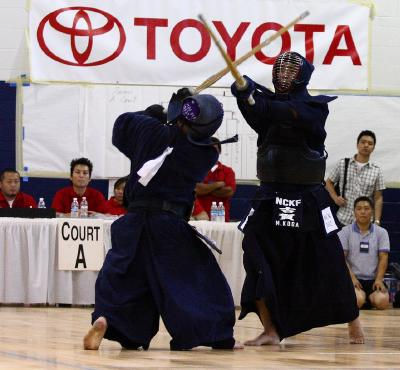
2008 Kendo U.S. National Championship Match. Dong Jin Kim (back facing camera) vs. Mikio Koga

In 1988, Kim moved to Fiji. From 1989 through 2000, Kim served in the Fiji Military Forces where he reached the rank of Major. During this time he founded the Fiji Hapkido Association and the Fiji Kendo Association. Kim also conducted combative and defensive tactics training for various law enforcement and military agencies including the Fiji Prison Service, the Fiji Intelligence Service, the protection detail for the President of Fiji, the Fiji Police Academy, and the Fiji Military Forces. At this time Kim received the honorary title of Captain from the Pohnpei Police Department in Micronesia.

In 2000, Kim moved to the United States where he began training various law enforcement and military agencies and units. These organizations include the Salt Lake City Police Department SWAT Team, the Salt Lake County Sheriffs Office, Davis County Sheriffs Office, the Ronald Reagan Washington National Airport Police, U.S. Army 19th Special Forces Group (Airborne), U.S. Coast Guard (Headquarters), U.S. Army Military Police (CID) - Protective Services Batallian, Federal Bureau of Investigation, Homeland Security Investigations, Drug Enforcement Administration, and the U.S. Secret Service. In addition to training military and law enforcement agencies, Kim also established training programs for the University of Maryland, American University, and the University of Utah. As a result, for his work with law enforcement, Grand Master Kim was awarded the rank of honorary colonel by The Salt Lake City Police Department in 2004.

In 2008, Kim partnered with the National Defense University to create their Combatives and Defensive Tactics course.

In 2010, Kim founded Shudokan Hapkido International and Shudokan Kendo jujutsu USA located in Washington, D.C. Kim served as the organizations' president.

In 2012, a Combatives and Defensive Tactics course was developed by Kim for the U.S. House of Representatives and delivered in the House Staff Fitness Center.

In 2012, Kim established a training program for the Bureau of Labor Statistics Fitness Center.

From 2013 to 2014, Kim taught combat jujutsu at a number of US government fitness centers, including at the United States Department of Energy, United States Justice Department and United States State Department.

In 2014, Kim established JTR Jujutsu International located in Washington, D.C. He is the founder and president.

In 2014, Kim became a member of Dai Nippon Butoku Kai (DNBK) 大日本武徳会 (lit. "Greater Japan Martial Virtue Society")

Dong Jin Kim died of heart failure in his martial arts school on the morning of February 21, 2015, a day after celebrating his 58th birthday there.

== U.S. National Kendo Champion ==
In 2008, Kim competed in the U.S. National Kendo Championship held in Las Vegas, Nevada, winning the title of National Champion in the Senior's Division.

== JTR Jujutsu ==
JTR Jujutsu
- Also known as: Jigo Tenshin-ryu Jujutsu
- Focus: Hybrid
- Creator: (South Korea) Dong Jin Kim
- Parenthood: Jujutsu, Hapkido
- Olympic sport: No

JTR Jujutsu, is a style of jujutsu developed by Dong Jin Kim that reflects the movements of the attacker back upon him or herself. This style or martial arts pairs classic Jujutsu techniques with modern combative applications. Based in Washington, D.C., JTR Jujutsu is taught as a course at the National Defense University, is practiced by U.S. Special Operations Forces, members of the U.S. Coast Guard, and members of the U.S. Army, as well as practiced by law enforcement officials from the Federal Bureau of Investigation, Homeland Security Investigations, Drug Enforcement Administration, and the U.S. Secret Service. JTR Jujutsu is also taught at U.S. House of Representatives in the House Staff Fitness Center, the U.S. Department of Labor Fitness Center, the United States Department of Energy Fitness Center, United States Justice Department Fitness Center and is the official jujutsu program at the United States State Department.

JTR Jujutsu and founder Dong Jin Kim were members of Dai Nippon Butoku Kai (DNBK).
