= Hwang Hyun-chul =

South Korean martial artist (born 1947)

- Born: March 4, 1947 (age 78); Seoul, South Korea
- Nationality: South Korea
- Style: Soo Bahk Do
- Teacher: Hwang Kee
- Rank: 10th dan blue belt in Soo Bahk Do (there is no 'black')

Other information
- Website: http://www.soobahkdo.com/

Hwang Hyun-chul (born on March 4, 1947) is a South Korean martial artist who is a tenth-degree midnight blue belt in Soo Bahk Do Moo Duk Kwan and the son of the late Hwang Kee, founder of the Soo Bahk Do Moo Duk Kwan (formerly Tang Soo Do Moo Duk Kwan) system.

== Biography ==
Hyun-chul Hwang was born in Seoul, South Korea, the oldest child of Moo Duk Kwan founder Hwang Kee. He began training in martial arts under his father, Hwang Kee, on May 5, 1954, at the age of 7. Two years later at the age of 9, he would become the youngest person in Korea to earn his black belt.

From 1970 to 1973, he was the head instructor at the Central Moo Duk Kwan dojang (school) and at the U.S. 8th Army Base in Yongsan, Korea. From there he would serve as head instructor for the Greek Tang Soo Do Moo Duk Kwan Federation, and an invitational instructor for the United Kingdom Tang Soo Do Moo Duk Kwan Federation. In 1975, Hwang moved to the United States and opened a school in Springfield, New Jersey.

In 1975, Hwang would soon become the chairman of the Technical Advisory Committee (TAC) for then U.S. Tang Soo Do Moo Duk Kwan Federation, serving under his father. In 1995, during the 50th anniversary celebration of the founding of the Moo Duk Kwan the elder Hwang officially renamed the art from Tang Soo Do Moo Duk Kwan to Soo Bahk Do, with the younger Hwang being named the president of the renamed U.S. Soo Bahk Do Moo Duk Kwan Federation.

For the next several years Hwang would rise up the ranks and eventually be promoted to the rank of ninth-degree black belt. In 2002, with the passing of his father, he was named as the new grandmaster of Soo Bahk Do Moo Duk Kwan. In 2004, Hwang was inducted into the Black Belt Hall of Fame as Man of the Year.
