= Pat E. Johnson =

American martial artist (1939–2023)

- Born: December 31, 1939; Niagara Falls, New York, U.S.
- Died: November 5, 2023 (aged 83); Los Angeles, California, U.S.
- Nationality: American
- Style: American Tang Soo Do
- Teachers: Chuck Norris, Kang Do Hee
- Rank: 9th degree black belt

Other information
- Notable students: Steve McQueen, Bob Barker, Osmond family, William Zabka

Patrick E. Johnson (December 31, 1939 – November 5, 2023) was an American martial artist and actor. He was a 9th-degree black belt in American Tang Soo Do and was the president of the National Tang Soo Do Congress that was created by Chuck Norris in 1973.

Johnson was famous for the martial arts choreography in The Karate Kid series, in which he also starred as the All Valley Karate Tournament head referee, and was involved in many films, as choreographer and actor, including Enter the Dragon (as a Mafia collection-agent who gets coldcocked by John Saxon), Teenage Mutant Ninja Turtles, Mortal Kombat, Green Street Hooligans, and Punisher: War Zone. He was the 1995 Black Belt magazine Instructor of the Year.

== Life and career ==
Patrick E. Johnson was born in Niagara Falls, New York on December 31, 1939. He began training in traditional Korean Tang Soo Do Moo Duk Kwan in 1963, while stationed in South Korea as a chaplain in the U.S. Army. While under the tutelage of a Korean master named Kang Lo Hee, Johnson earned his black belt in just thirteen months. After his army service ended, Johnson met and formed an association with Tang Soo Do instructor Chuck Norris. Johnson soon rose to the rank of chief instructor at Norris' school in Sherman Oaks, California in 1968. That same year, he formulated the penalty-point system still used by karate tournaments.

From 1968 to 1973, Johnson was captain of the undefeated Chuck Norris black belt competition team, which won 33 consecutive national and international titles. In 1971, he became the National Tang Soo Do Champion. In both 1975 and 1976, Johnson was awarded the prestigious Golden Fist Award for best karate referee in the United States.

In 1973, Norris founded the National Tang Soo Do Congress (NTC), and named Johnson as executive vice president and chief of instruction. In 1979, Norris disbanded the NTC and formed the United Fighting Arts Federation (UFAF), again naming Johnson as executive vice president.

In 1980, Johnson had a small supporting role in the feature film The Little Dragons (later known as The Karate Kids U.S.A.). In the film, Johnson played the karate instructor to a pair of young brothers (portrayed by Chris and Pat Petersen) who use their martial arts skills to foil a kidnapping plot.

In 1984, Johnson served as stunt co-ordinator on The Karate Kid. Johnson also featured in the movie as the chief referee in the All Valley Karate Tournament. He was one of only four cast members who knew any martial arts before shooting began (Note: The others being Chad McQueen (Dutch), Ron Thomas (Bobby), and Darryl Vidal (who was featured in the Semi Final against Johnny Lawrence).), and the only cast member besides Ralph Macchio, Pat Morita, and Martin Kove to reprise their role for the first two sequels.

In 1986, Johnson was promoted to ninth-degree black belt. The same year, after a difference of opinion with Norris, he left the UFAF and reformed the NTC.

Johnson died in Los Angeles on November 5, 2023, at the age of 83.

== Achievements ==
- 1963: Began training in taekwondo in South Korea under Kang Do Hee.
- 1965: Received 1st-degree black belt in taekwondo.
- 1968: Began training under Chuck and was made chief of instruction for Norris' school.
- 1968: Formulated the penalty point system currently used in karate tournaments.
- 1968–1973: Served as captain of the Chuck Norris Black Belt Competition Team, which won 33 consecutive national and international titles.
- 1971: Became national Tang Soo Do champion
- 1973: Was named vice-president of the National Tang Soo Do Congress, by Chuck Norris.
- 1975–1976: Won the Golden Fist Award for the best karate referee in the United States.
- 1980: Named as executive vice-president of the United Fighting Arts Federation.
- 1984: Served as the stunt coordinator for The Karate Kid.
- 1986: Awarded 9th-degree black belt by Chuck Norris.
- 1986: Due to philosophical reasons left UFAF, and reformed the National Tang Soo Do Congress.
- 1989: Served as stunt coordinator for Teenage Mutant Ninja Turtles.
- 1993: Inducted into the North American Sport Karate Association (NASKA) Hall of Fame.
- 1995: Served as stunt coordinator for Mortal Kombat.
- 1996: Inducted into the Black Belt magazine Black Belt Hall of Fame as "Instructor of the Year".
