= Wonik Yi =

Martial artist

- Born: 1959 (age 66–67); Korea
- Height: 6 ft 0 in (183 cm)
- Weight: 198 lb (90 kg; 14 st 2 lb)
- Style: Tukong Moosul (Also as: Teuk Gong Moo Sool)
- Teacher: Eun Kwang Bup Sa
- Rank: 9th degree black belt

Other information
- Notable school: World Tukong Moosul Federation

Wonik Yi is a martial artist and the founder of the World Tukong Moosul Teuk Gong Moo Sool Federation.

== Biography ==
In 1964, at the age of five, Wonik Yi entered the Dae Yeon Sa Temple in Korea and lived there until the age of nineteen. Dae Yeon Sa is a Buddhist temple that teaches martial arts in a tradition that dates back 800 years. He trained in Moosul (traditional martial arts) under the guidance of his teacher, Eun Kwang Bup Sa, until he joined the South Korean Special Forces. Yi also trained in Shaolin Kung Fu style martial arts. Due to this, there are many similarities between Tukong Moosul and Shaolin style martial arts.

While he was in the army Yi was asked to devise a more modern, powerful, and effective fighting martial arts for the South Korea Special Forces. The military version of Tukong Martial Arts was born in February 1978. In 1980, Korean Military 26th division became Tukong Division and most other divisions started training men using Yi's system. There are now several hundred thousand South Korean military and reserve soldiers training each year in the military version of Tukong Martial Arts.

Wonik Yi moved to the United States in 1982 and has been teaching Tukong Moosul in Austin, Texas since then. The Tukong Moosul taught by Yi at his facility in Austin is taught in a similar style to the forms he learned in South Korea.

Yi's Tukong Moosul is the combination of the traditional ancient temple style and an innovative modern style based on scientific research and theories.

== Filmography ==
Grand Master Yi has participated in several films, offering his expertise in the martial arts.

Year	Film	Capacity	Notes
2002	The Teacup	Actor	
2005	Sin City	Martial arts trainer	
2009	Stone & Sand	Producer	
2010	Templar: Honor Among Thieves	Action director	In pre-production

== Notes ==
- "Dae Yeon Sa Temple (Great Achievement Temple)". World Tukong Moosul Association.
- "Eun Kwang Bup Sa (Temple Headmaster)". World Tukong Moosul Association.
- "General Chang Ki Oh (South Korean Special Forces)". World Tukong Moosul Association.
