= Kyung Sun Shin =

Korean master of judo (b. 1933)

Shin Kyung Sun
- K. S. Shin executing a throwing technique, 1969
- Born: 1933 (age 92–93); Seoul, Korea
- Style: Judo, Karate, Tang Soo Do, Taekwondo, Hapkido
- Rank: 8th dan judo

Other information
- Notable school: Military Arts Institute

Shin Kyung Sun (born 1933) is a Korean master of judo and a pioneer of that art in the United States of America. He is ranked 8th dan in judo, and also holds dan ranking in karate.

Shin was born in 1933 in Seoul, Korea. He began training in the martial arts in 1943, and was a long distance runner in high school. During the Korean War, he served in the Special Student Battalion of the Republic of Korea Army. He owned a pharmacy in South Korea, although he was not a pharmacist himself. He had studied English literature at Hongik University, but did not complete the course. He did, however, captain the institution's judo team to the National Collegiate Championship in 1958, his second year there.

Around 1960, Shin emigrated to the US intending to seek a position in a pharmaceutical company. He went to Illinois at first, studied liberal arts in Georgia (where he met and befriended fellow Korean Mas Oyama, founder of Kyokushin karate), and then returned to Illinois in 1963. He studied accounting part-time at the University of Chicago, and it was around this time that he met his future wife, Sandy Hamilton, a biochemistry student who is also a judo practitioner. She was ranked 1st dan at the time.

Shin founded the Military Arts Institute in 1963, and also published a judo magazine. Apart from judo, Shin also teaches taekwondo and hapkido. Around 1967, he visited Seoul and discussed the possibility of a taekwondo tournament in Chicago with Choi Hong Hi, founder of the International Taekwon-Do Federation. In 1977, he was a member of the organizing committee for the Third World Taekwondo Championships. Shin co-authored the book Judo (1977) with Daeshik Kim.

One of the Shins' sons, Gene Shin, holds the rank of 5th dan in judo and teaches the art in Virginia.
