= Gordon Doversola =

American martial artist

- Born: 1 December 1934
- Died: 19 April 2011 (aged 76)
- Occupation: Martial Arts Trainer

Gordon Doversola (1 December 1934 – 19 April 2011) was an American martial arts expert who specialized in the Okinawa-te school of Karate. He taught various film and television celebrities.

== Early years ==
Gordon Doversola was from Hawaii. He was born on 1 December 1934. His family was of Hawaiian, Chinese, and Filipino origin, and he retained a strong sense of his cultures. He started to train in jujutsu under Seshiro Okazaki in Danzan Ryu when he was eleven, and then was taught kenpō by Sijo Adriano Emperado, Joe Emperado along with Woodrow McCandless at the Palama Settlement. He also boxed as an amateur in 56 bouts. Doversola was proficient in other martial arts before he created his own system which he called Okinawa-te, which he claimed he had learned from Teiken Nagusuko, who had been taught the art by Kehei Motobu. Doversola claimed this to hide the truth of his being a backdoor student of Professor James Mitose back in the late 50's. Doversola created Okinawa-te as an effective and aggressive street fighting art that combined techniques from other martial arts he studied.

Doversola was one of a number of karate instructors who began teaching in the 1950s, some of whom had learned while posted to Okinawa or Japan by the army. Others were Ed Parker, Cecil T. Patterson, Donald Hugh Nagle, George Mattson and Peter Urban. Doversola moved to Los Angeles in 1957, where he opened one of the city's first karate dojos and taught Okinawa-te karate. He founded the Okinawa-te Karate Organization. Doversola taught the martial artist Joe Lewis (1944–2012) and actor Martin Kove, who earned a black belt.

== Okinawa-te ==
The cover of the 15th issue of Black Belt (March 1965) had a photograph of Doversola executing a flying side kick in an Okinawa-te demonstration. According to Doversola, Okinawa-te is thought to have originated with martial arts brought to the Ryukyu Islands from China. Because the Japanese did not allow the locals to practice fighting, they developed methods that seemed harmless but were designed to counter Japanese martial arts, and used weapons derived from farm implements. Weapons thus resemble pitchforks, staffs, paddles and other harmless objects. The fighting technique is sometimes called the forerunner of modern karate. Doversola claimed that, "In some ways we are more traditional than many kung fu schools, in that our art is derived directly from the monks, or so it is said."

== Films and TV ==
In 1962 Doversola coordinated the stunts and trained Frank Sinatra for the film The Manchurian Candidate. Beau Vanden Ecker, who helped coordinate the fight in The Manchurian Candidate, went on to teach Okinawa-te moves to Dean Martin for The Silencers (1966). Doversola played bit parts and provided technical advice in the 1960s television series Burke's Law (1963–65), The Man from U.N.C.L.E. (1964–68) and Honey West (1965–66). Doversola taught karate moves to Anne Francis for four months before production started on Honey West. A double did the more violent moves in the show, but Francis was trained so she could look realistic in the close-up shots. In the late 1960s Doversola trained the actor and martial artist Jim Kelly, co-star with Bruce Lee of the classic kung fu film Enter the Dragon.

Gordon Doversola died on 19 April 2011 at the age of 76 from complications resulting from a stroke and diabetes.

== Sources ==
- Eakin, Annetta (2014-10-05). How to Start a Hobby in Karate. MicJames. GGKEY:E275LXPYA4K.
- Freese, Gene Scott (2014-04-10). Hollywood Stunt Performers, 1910s-1970s: A Biographical Dictionary, 2d ed. McFarland. ISBN 978-1-4766-1470-0.
- "From the archives". Black Belt. Active Interest Media, Inc. May 2001. ISSN 0277-3066.
- "Gordon Doversola". Martialinfo.com.
- Hoag, David (June 1984). "The Rare Weapons of Okinawa". Black Belt.
- Lentz, Harris M. III (2012-05-03). "Doversola, Gordon". Obituaries in the Performing Arts, 2011. McFarland. ISBN 978-0-7864-9134-6.
- Lentz, Harris M. III (2014-05-20). Obituaries in the Performing Arts, 2013. McFarland. ISBN 978-0-7864-7665-7.
- Lewis, Joe (2011). "Shihan Gordon Doversola". Archived from the original on 2012-12-05.
- Rosenthal, Jim (October 1987). "Okinawa-te. A Bridge Between Karate & Kung Fu". Black Belt.
- Wagner, Laura (2011-06-30). Anne Francis: The Life and Career. McFarland. ISBN 978-0-7864-8600-7.
