= United Fighting Arts Federation =

Martial arts governing body

- Abbreviation: UFAF
- Formation: 1979
- Type: Sports Federation
- Purpose: Governing, Regulatory
- Headquarters: Las Vegas, Nevada
- Location: United States
- Region served: International
- Members: Chuck Norris System Black Belts
- Official language: English
- Chairman of the Board: Chuck Norris
- Website: www.ufaf.org

The United Fighting Arts Federation (UFAF) is a martial arts organization founded by Chuck Norris in 1979. UFAF is the governing and sanctioning body for the Chuck Norris System, a martial art Norris developed from Tang Soo Do, and which was known as the Chuck Norris System in the early to mid 1980s and as Chun Kuk Do from December 1990 until July 2015. UFAF provides technical standards for instruction and advancement in the system, and also provides its students, instructors, and schools with Chuck Norris System rank certification, educational opportunities, special events, online community access, and other services.

== Organizational structure ==
Like many organizations, UFAF includes an executive board and a board of directors.

Executives

- Chuck Norris, 10th degree black belt – Founder, Chairman of the Board
- Aaron Norris, 10th degree black belt – Chief Executive Officer (Corp & Org)
- Ken Gallacher, 10th degree black belt - President (Corp & Org)
- Tara Cox, 9th degree black belt - Executive Vice President (Corp & Org), Treasurer (Corp), Director of Operations (Org)

Board of Directors

- Chip Wright, 9th degree black belt - Vice President, Director, Tournament & Competition (Org)
- Ed Saenz, 9th degree black belt - Director, Training and Advancement (Org)
- John Presti, 9th degree black belt - Director, Special Events (Org)
- Stephen Hammersley, 9th degree black belt - Director, UFAF Krav Maga (Org)
- Rick Prieto, 9th degree black belt - Director, Training & Development (Org)
- David Rodriguez, 9th degree black belt - Director, Latin American Affairs (Org
- Mike Dillard, 9th degree black belt - Director, Professional Development (Org)
- Steve Giroux, 9th degree black belt - Director, Professional Development (Org)
- Clayton Ferguson, 9th degree black belt - Director, Regional Tournaments & Events (Org)
- Steve Brown, 8th degree black belt - Director, UFAF Marketing & Branding (Org)

UFAF is also further divided into several regions across the United States, Canada, and Mexico. International locations and members are also included among the following regions:

- Region 1 – Southern California USA (Regional Chair Kenny Herrera)
- Region 2 – Great Basin USA (Including satellites in Colorado, Nebraska, and Norway) (Regional Chair Joe Gemma)
- Region 3 – Northwest USA ((Regional Chair Jeremy Pasimio)
- Region 4 – Texas USA, excluding KICKSTART KIDS schools (see Region 13) (Regional Chair Austin Jamieson)
- Region 5 – Southwest USA (Regional Chair Howard Munding)
- Region 6 – Appalachia West USA (Schools in Western West Virginia, Ohio, Kentucky) (Regional Chair Amber Ferguson)
- Region 7 – Southeast USA (Regional Chair Lindy Woods)
- Region 8 – Northeast USA (Regional Chair Doug Shaffer)
- Region 9 – Mexico Baja (Including satellites in South America) (Regional Chair David Rodriguez)
- Region 10 – Northern Mexico (Regional Chair Rodolfo Varela)
- Region 11 – Appalachia East USA (Schools in Eastern West Virginia, Virginia) (Regional Chair Van Frasher)
- Region 12 – Mexico City area (Regional Chair Jorge Alonzo)
- Region 13 – Texas KICKSTART (KICKSTART KIDS Schools in Texas) (Regional Chair Sonia Moreno-White)
- Region 15 - Europe (Regional Chair Kenneth Fjeld)

== Events ==
Each summer, the United Fighting Arts Federation holds a training conference and Chuck Norris System World Championship tournament in Las Vegas, Nevada.
