= Soo Bahk Do =

Korean martial art

Soo Bahk Do 수박도
- Also known as: Subakdo, Subakto, Tang Soo Do Moo Duk Kwan (Note: Name of Hwang Kee's original Karate style before changing it to Soo Bahk Do in late 50s or early 60s.)
- Focus: Defense
- Hardness: 60% Hard, 40% Soft
- Country of origin: South Korea
- Creator: Hwang Kee
- Parenthood: Taijiquan, Okinawan Karate, and possibly elements from Muyedobotongji
- Official website: https://www.soobahkdoinstitute.com/

- Soo Bahk Do
- Hangul: 수박도
- Hanja: 手搏道
- RR: Subakdo
- MR: Subakto

Soo Bahk Do (수박도) is a martial art founded by Kwan Jang Nim Hwang Kee, and now is taught by Kwan Jang Nim Hwang Hyun Chul, known as H.C. Hwang, and instructors who are certified by member organizations of the World Moo Duk Kwan, Inc. This martial art was originally claimed to be the ancient martial art of Korea. Hwang Kee created Moo Duk Kwan with influence from Okinawan Karate and Shaolin Long Fist, and Taijiquan.

== History ==
On November 9, 1945, Kwang Jang Nim Hwang Kee (1914- 2002) founded the Moo Duk Kwan. During World War 2, Japan occupied Korea, preventing Hwang Kee from opening his studio. After Korea was liberated, he seized his opportunity to open a studio and begin training students. In late 1950s, the five kwans (Other popular Korean martial arts) began the unification process that would lead to creation of Taekwondo and the Korea Taekwondo Association. At first, Hwang Kee and his Moo Duk Kwan agreed to be part of the unification. However, Kee would reverse and withdraw Moo Duk Kwan from the process in 1958. Hwang Kee wished to keep Soo Bahk Do away from becoming a sport or for military use, and instead stay about personal growth. On June 30, 1960, Hwang Kee changed the name Moo Duk Kwan's martial art from Tang Soo Do to Soo Bahk Do. After he passed at age 87, the art was taken over by his son Hwang Hyun Chul.

However, this led to divisions within Moo Duk Kwan, with certain former students continuing to teach Tang Soo Do at their schools and in 1965, a faction of students led by Hong Chong Soo joined the unification effort of the kwans. Regardless, Hwang Kee, Moo Duk Kwan and Soo Bahk Do persisted.

== Features ==
Soo Bahk Do is notable for its use of strong, deep stances as in Karate, while also emphasizing a very active use of the hip to help generate force in each movement performed. It is known for its vast array of kicks, a hallmark of Korean martial arts.

Additionally, its pyong-an (Pinan) utilize many direct, linear forms similar to Shotokan Karate Kata, while the individual blocks, strikes, and techniques themselves often utilize the more circular constructions of other Korean martial arts, as influenced by Northern Chinese martial arts styles throughout history.

== Ranks ==
Soo Bahk Do uses a traditional belt ranking system for Korean Martial Arts:

1. White (10th to 9th geup rank)
2. Orange (8th to 7th geup)
3. Green (6th to 4th geup)
4. Red (3rd to 1st geup)
5. Midnight Blue (1st to 3rd dan rank)
6. Midnight Blue with Central Red stripe (4th dan and above)

Note that for some Dojang, a grading system using a Yellow belt prior to orange belt may be employed, especially for the younger practitioners.

After a participant earns their Cho Dan, (First degree midnight blue), they receive a Don Bon number. This is an ID number used across the globe in Soo Bahk Do. A practitioner holds onto their Dan Bon even after they stop training, and it marks them in the timeline of Soo Bahk Do. As of 2019, a total of 50,000 Dan Bon numbers had been issued.

== Instructors ==
Soo Bahk do has three different levels of instructors. The first is Jo Kyo, meaning assistant instructor. To become a Jo Kyo, a practitioner must be at least a 1st gup and study for at minimum 90 days. They are required to complete a written test and spend a certain number of hours assisting with classes. Leading activities such as warm ups, new material, and assisting students of all ranks is a major part of the work hours needed. The second level of certification is Kyo Sa. To become a Kyo Sa, a practitioner must be at least a 2nd Dan and over 18 years of age. They are required to study for at least one year, teach classes to students of all ranks, and complete a written test. The 3rd level of certification is Sa Bom. To become a Sa Bom, a practitioner must be at least 21 years old and be a 4th dan. They must study for two years completing both written work and tests as well as teaching in their local Dojang and passing a teaching test at a Ko Dan Ja Shim Sa ( Rank testing for practitioners 4th dan and above). A practitioner with a Kyo Sa or Sa Bom certification is able to open their own Dojang and approve rank tests for gup member.

== See also ==
- Moo Duk Kwan
- Tang Soo Do
