= Moo Duk Kwan =

South Korean martial arts organization

Moo Duk Kwan (무덕관)
- Moo Duk Kwan fist logo, created by Hwang Kee in 1955
- Date founded: 1945-11-09
- Country of origin: South Korea
- Founder: Hwang Kee (November 9, 1914–July 14, 2002)
- Current head: Hwang Hyun-chul
- Arts taught: Soo Bahk Do (Note: Moo Duk Kwan's style was first promoted as Tang Soo Do. Hwang Kee started calling the style Soo Bahk Do circa 1957 and in 1995, Hwang Kee officially renamed the art from Tang Soo Do Moo Duk Kwan to Soo Bahk Do Moo Duk Kwan.)
- Official website: http://worldmoodukkwan.com

- Moo Duk Kwan
- Hangul: 무덕관
- Hanja: 武德館
- RR: Mudeokgwan
- MR: Mudŏkkwan

Moo Duk Kwan is the name of a martial art organization founded by Hwang Kee in South Korea in 1945. Licensed Moo Duk Kwan schools teach Soo Bahk Do, formerly Tang Soo Do (and earlier 'Hwa Soo Do'). 'Moo Duk Kwan' translates as "School of Martial Virtue". Tang Soo Do Moo Duk Kwan translates to “the brotherhood and school of stopping inner and outer conflict and developing virtue according to the way of the worthy hand”

== History ==
As a child, Hwang Kee witnessed a man using Taekyon to defend himself against a large group. The experience later inspired him to develop his own martial art. Although the Korea Taekkyon Associate disputes Hwang's story, Hwang says that the man refused to teach him, leaving him to devise his own system based on what he had seen. Traveling between Manchuria and Korea during World War II, Hwang later successfully appealed to Chinese martial arts teacher Yang Kuk Jin for training, fusing together Chinese and Korean martial arts into a form he initially called Hwa Soo Do ("the Way of the Flowering Hand"), altering to Tang Soo Do after the November 9, 1945 opening of a training hall proved unsuccessful. The new name led to greater success.

Hwang Kee further expanded his Moo Duk Kwan school of martial arts after in 1957 he was introduced to the Muye Dobo Tongji by a librarian at the Korean National University in Seoul. It referenced the martial arts system of Gwonbeop, a bare hands and feet technique. Hwang Kee changed the name of his martial art system to "Soo Bahk Do" on June 30, 1960.

By 1960, Tang Soo Do was being practiced by almost 75% of all martial artists in Korea, but the art did face challenges particularly in expanding beyond Korea, including attempted mergers into Taekwondo. However, in spite of these challenges it eventually spread worldwide, with close to 300,000 practitioners.

inline,

After Hwang Kee died on July 14, 2002, his son Hwang Hyun-chul (Jin Mun) was named his successor. His appointment was approved unanimously by the Board of Directors of the United States Soo Bahk Do Moo Duk Kwan Federation, Inc. as well as other chapters through the world.

== Trademark and schools ==
In the United States, "Moo Duk Kwan" and the fist logo are federally registered trademarks of the U.S. Soo Bahk Do Moo Duk Kwan Federation and "Soo Bahk Do" and the "Soo Bahk Do logo" are service marks.

== See also ==
- Soo Bahk Do
- Moo Duk Kwan Taekwondo
- Tang Soo Do
- Kwan (martial arts)
- Taekwondo
