= Tang Soo Do =

Korean martial art

- Also known as: Dang Soo Do, Korean Karate
- Country of origin: South Korea
- Founder: Either: Won Kuk Lee (Note: Founder of Chung Do Kwan, the first "Korean Karate" school to teach Tang Soo Do.); Hwang Kee (Note: Most of the existing Tang Soo Do schools globally owe heritage to Hwang Kee's Moo Duk Kwan-style Tang Soo Do.)
- Ancestor arts: Okinawan Karate, Taijiquan, and Shaolin Long Fist
- Descendant arts: Taekwondo, (Note: Via Chung Do Kwan and Moo Duk Kwan.) Chuck Norris System, (Note: formerly known as "Chun Kuk Do".) American Kickboxing, American Karate, Jeet Kun Do, American Tang Soo Do, XMA, Gan Soo Do, Kajukenbo, Soo Bahk Do (Note: AKA "Tang Soo Do Moo Duk Kwan".)

- Tang Soo Do
- Hangul: 당수도
- Hanja: 唐手道
- RR: Dangsudo
- MR: Tangsudo

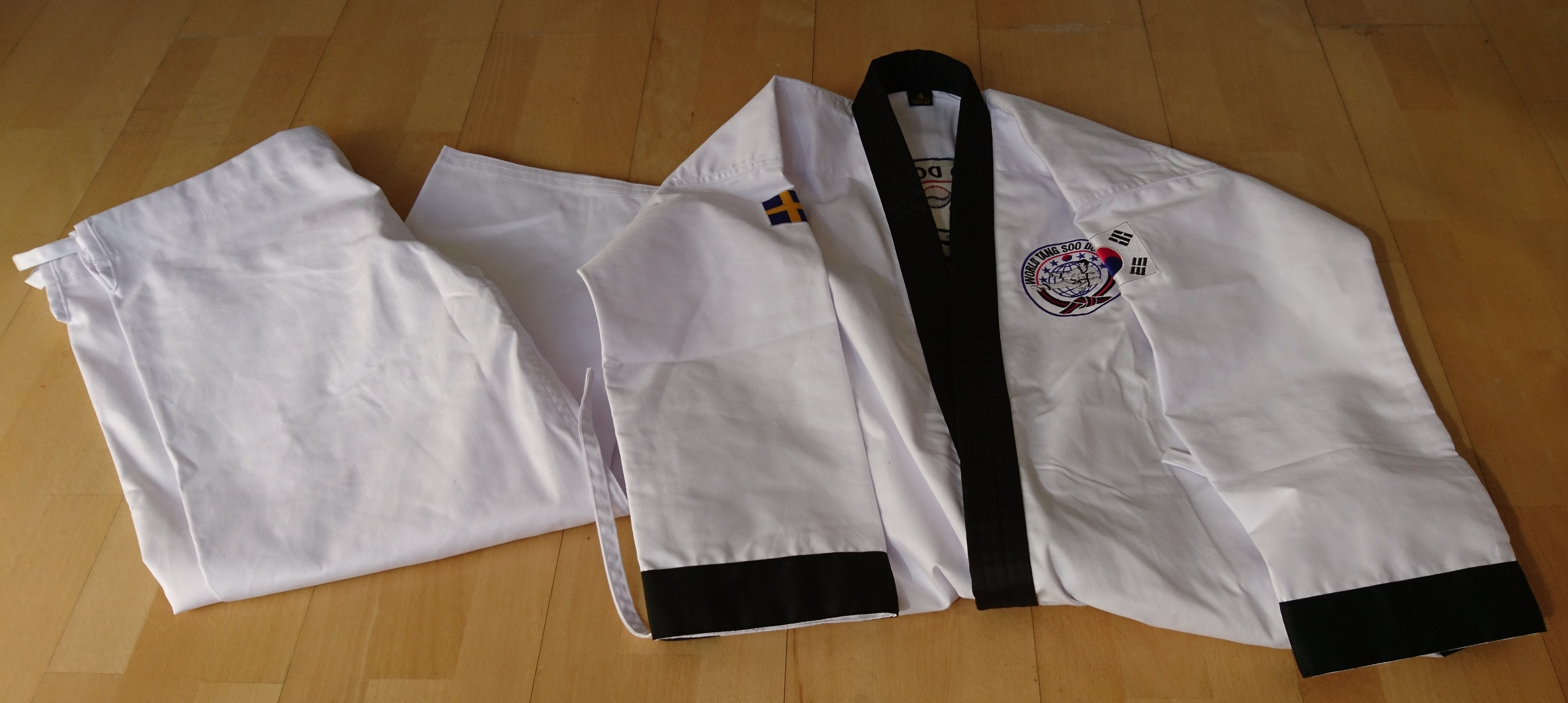
Black Belt World Tang Soo Do Association Dobok

Tang Soo Do (Korean: 당수도; Hanja: 唐手道; pronounced [taŋ.su.do]) is a Korean martial art based on influences of Okinawan Karate, Taijiquan, and Shaolin Long Fist. From its beginnings in 1944 to today, Tang Soo Do is used by some Kwans to identify the traditional Korean fusion of fighting styles. In the mid 1950s, it became the basis for the martial art taekwondo when the Korean Nine Kwans united.

In contemporary context, many Korean martial arts entities continued to use Tang Soo Do to preserve the elements of Korean martial arts that evolved from the original nine kwans' karate roots and were lost in transition to taekwondo. The techniques of what is commonly known as Tang Soo Do combine elements of Okinawan Karate, Taijiquan, and Shaolin Long Fist.

== Etymology ==
Tang Soo Do is half Chinese karate, having straight punches, and half kung fu, having circular blocks. "Tang Soo Do" (당수도) is the Korean pronunciation of the Hanja 唐手道 (pronounced Táng shǒu dào in Mandarin), and translates literally to "The Way of the Tang Hand." A distinct Taiwanese hybrid martial art, also called Tang Shou Dao, uses the same Chinese characters as Tang Soo Do but is slightly different from each other despite having some similarities due to incorporations from karate and southern Chinese kung fu.

The same characters can be pronounced "karate-dō" in Japanese. In the early 1930s, approximately 55 years after Japan's annexation of Okinawa, Gichin Funakoshi in coordination with others changed the first character, 唐, which referred to the Chinese Tang dynasty, to 空, signifying "empty"; both characters can be pronounced "kara" in Japanese, though 唐 is more commonly rendered in its on'yomi as "Tou". Funakoshi ostensibly wanted to avoid confusion with Chinese Kenpō, and emphasize the Japanese rather than Chinese identity of his martial art. Funakoshi claimed Okinawan karate could "now be considered a Japanese martial art" and found the China reference "inappropriate" and "in a sense degrading". The Mandarin pronunciation of 空手道 is kōng-shǒu-dào, and the Korean is pronounced [koŋsʰudo](공수도).

Outside of the Far East, the term "Tang Soo Do" has primarily become synonymous with the Korean martial art promoted by grandmaster Hwang Kee.

== History ==
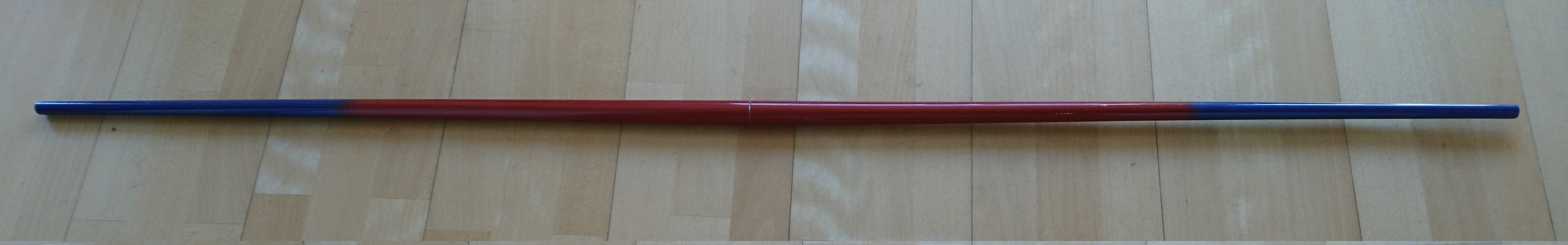
Bong is a weapon used in Tang Soo Do. This one is 160 cm long.

Between 1944 and Korea's liberation from Japanese rule in 1945, the original schools or kwans of Tang Soo Do were founded in Korea by practitioners who studied Okinawan karate and had exposure to kung-fu. At the time, there were five kwans (schools) of Taekwondo, of which only Chung Do Kwan of Won-kuk Lee and Moo Duk Kwan of Hwang Kee identified their martial arts as Tang Soo Do. Shortly after the Korean War and in 1953, four more offshoot schools formed. Of these second-generation kwans, Choi Hong-hi and Nam Tae-hi's Oh Do Kwan and Lee Young-woo's Jung Do Kwan splintered from Chung Do Kwan style of Tang Soo Do.

In 1960s, despite the Korean nationalist effort to combine kwans, some schools chose not to change their style and name to taekwondo during the effort led by Syngman Rhee to create a single organization. These kwans still flourish and other branches have since been developed.

=== Chung Do Kwan ===
Chung Do Kwan has survived in Korea as a fraternal friendship social club of Kukkiwon Taekwondo. Its organization follows the Kukkiwon curriculum and is no longer an individual Tang Soo Do style. Some of the older Chung Do Kwan schools practice the original Pyongahn forms which Lee Won-Kuk incorporated from Shotokan karate. Schools tracing their lineage to Duk Sung Son when he founded the World Tae Kwon Do Association in the U.S. after leaving Korea also practice Kuk Mu forms.

Other older Chung do Kwan schools practice the Palgwae forms, a predecessor of the Taegeuk forms. After black belt, practitioners of the Kukkiwon system practice the Yudanja and Kodanja series of black belt poomsae of Kukkiwon (Koryo, Kumgang, Taebaek, Pyongwon, Sipjin, Jitae, Cheonkwon, Hansoo, Ilyo). Many Chung Do Kwan schools also practice the Chang Hun tul, even if they are not affiliated with the International Taekwon-Do Federation.

The Chung Do Kwan style of Tang Soo Do was introduced to the U.S. by Jhoon Rhee. In the late 1950s and early 60s, Rhee was teaching what he called Korean karate (or Tang Soo Do) in Texas. After receiving the ROK Army field manual (which contained a martial arts curriculum under the new name of Taekwondo) from Gen. Choi, Rhee began using the name "Taekwondo".

=== Moo Duk Kwan ===
Because of its political influence, the KTA, led by its second president, General Choi Hong-hi, tried to assimilate the Moo Duk Kwan. Kwanjangnim's organization was the largest martial arts system in Korea at the time. Grandmaster Hwang Kee agreed to discuss unification but, when it became clear that he would not be in charge of the new organization, he ultimately refused. The result was a weakening of the Moo Duk Kwan as the Tae Kwon Do movement grew in strength, absorbing many Moo Duk Kwan members in the process.

Due to political in-fighting and splintering, Moo Duk Kwan Tang Soo Do has had several members break off. Regardless, the Moo Duk Kwan as founded by Hwang Kee persists. Hwang Kee and a large constituent of the Moo Duk Kwan continued to develop a version of Tang Soo Do that eventually became what is now known as "Soo Bahk Do Moo Duk Kwan". This modified version of Tang Soo Do incorporates more fluid "soft" movements reminiscent of certain traditional Chinese martial arts.

After death of Hwang Kee, the Moo Duk Kwan continues to represent Soo Bahk Do worldwide, and is headed by Hwang Kee's son, Hwang Hyun-chul.

There are still a multitude of contemporary Taekwondo schools in the United States that teach what is known as "Moo Duk Kwan Taekwondo". This nomenclature reflects this government-ordered kwan merger.

== Present ==
The World Tang Soo Do Association and the International Tang Soo Do Federation teach systems of Tang Soo Do that existed before the Taekwondo "merger" and before the development of modern Soo Bahk Do Moo Duk Kwan. These versions of Tang Soo Do are heavily influenced by Korean culture and also appear to be related to Okinawan Karate as initially taught in Japan by Gichin Funakoshi.

The Amateur Athletic Union Taekwondo recognizes Tang Soo Do ranks, permits Tang Soo Do hyeong in competition and hosts non-Olympic-style point-sparring to accommodate the various traditional Korean stylists.

=== American Tang Soo Do ===
American Tang Soo Do was formed in 1966 by Chuck Norris. It is a combination of Moo Duk Kwan-style Tang Soo Do, (Note: Older system taught by Shin Jae-chul. Not Soo Bahk Do that Moo Duk Kwan founder eventually developed the original style into.) Judo and Karate (Shito-Ryu and Shotokan). Over the years it has been further developed by former black belts of his and their students.

American Tang Soo Do's original governing body was the National Tang Soo Do Congress (NTC) founded in 1973 by Chuck Norris as its president and Pat E. Johnson as its vice-president and Chief of Instruction after breaking ties with the Moo Duk Kwan. In 1979, Norris dissolved the NTC and formed his current organization the United Fighting Arts Federation (UFAF) and named Johnson as executive vice president. In 1986, Norris promoted Johnson to ninth-degree black belt.

At that time due to a philosophical difference of opinion with Norris, Johnson would leave the UFAF and reform the NTC as the governing body for American Tang Soo Do while Norris kept UFAF as the parent organization for his new martial arts system of Chun Kuk Do, in 1990.

Despite Chuck Norris leaving the American Tang Soo Do, the entity still persists as 16 schools across the USA.

=== Mi Guk Kwan ===
Mi Guk Kwan ("American Brotherhood of the Empty Hand Defense") is an organization of 35 schools, founded by Grandmaster Charles J. Ferraro. The Tang Soo Do Mi Guk Kwan system is a classical martial art concerned with scientific and martial theory, form and aesthetics.

=== Moo Yea Tang Soo Do ===
Moo Yea Tang Soo Do (MYTSD) is a national association of 35+ martial arts schools that aims to serve its members while helping each studio maintain its independent spirit. They do not exist to govern the practices of individual schools, but rather provide a Tang Soo Do community that allows for continued learning, business success, and rank advancement. Moo Yea was formed by grandmaster David Sgro to provide a national network to help Train, Test, and organize Tournaments.

== Ranking systems ==
Tang Soo Do uses the colored belt system that was instituted by Judo's founder Jigoro Kano and popularized in Karate-do by Gichin Funakoshi. However, minor deviations according to organization and/or individual school are commonplace. One differentiating characteristic of the Moo Duk Kwan style is that the black belt, or dan rank, is frequently represented by a midnight blue belt (some Chung Do Kwan schools also have adopted this custom) for students who attain dan rank. The reason for the midnight blue belt is the belief in Korean culture that black symbolizes perfection. As no one is perfect, the belt for the dan rank is a midnight blue color. It was also a belief of the founder of Moo Duk Kwan, Hwang Kee, that black is a color to which nothing can be added, thus blue signifies that a dan holder is still learning. The white belt means a birth or beginning of a person's will to acquire the skills of karate, the white belt symbolizes winter. The yellow belt signifies the beaming sunlight of spring. The orange belt signifies the strength of the rising sun. (The yellow belt and the orange belt both symbolizes spring) The green belt depicts the penetration of stems and roots of the plant to get the sunlight, the green belt symbolizes summer. The red belt this stage represents the seed which is now a flowering plant, representing the students improvement, participation and advancement, It symbolizes Summer.

Many schools and organizations still opt to use the black belt. The Moo Duk Kwan, and some Chung Do Kwan schools of Tang Soo Do incorporate a red-striped midnight blue (or black) belt to denote individuals who have reached the rank of Sa Beom (master 사범님/師範님), or 4th dan. The original non-dan, or geup, belt colors established by Hwang Kee were white belt, green belt, and red belt. In the 1970s, an orange belt was added after the white belt, along with either one or two stripes on the orange, green and red belts, encompassing ten geup (student) levels, and is currently the system in use in the Moo Duk Kwan. Many variations of this ranking system are still used and typically employ other colors (such as yellow, brown, purple, and blue). However, this is primarily a western influence.

The black belts (or midnight blue belts) are called dans and each degree has its own specific name. The dan rank ranges from 1st through 9th degree. In the Moo Duk Kwan, dan level is known by its Korean numeration, such as cho dan (1st), ee dan (2nd) and sam dan (3rd), and onward. In many organizations, the titles of kyosa (instructor 교사/敎師) and sa bom (master 사범/師範) are separately awarded after successfully demonstrating ability, knowledge, understanding and character for that level in a dan simsa (심사/審査), or test. One may not test for kyosa (certified instructor) until 2nd dan, or sabom (master instructor) until 4th dan or above. Dan levels from 4th dan onward are known as kodanja (고단자/高段者), whether sabom or not. Also in the U.S., a simple timing structure was created for the dan ranking system. If in constant study, then it was easy to measure when testing for the next rank. The next dan number was equal to the minimum number of years that must be spent training to achieve that dan. For example, a first dan would have two years before they could be a candidate for second dan, and so on.

== Techniques and patterns ==
=== Hyeong ===
Forms (hyeong) vary depending upon the founder or head of the different federations of Tang Soo Do. Tang Soo Do forms are a set of moves demonstrating a defensive or aggressive action for every movement taken mainly from Japanese shotokan karate kata. They are based on an offender attacking and one demonstrating the form reacting to their attack. They are generally memorized and demonstrated at a test for ranking up or a tournament.

Traditionally, nine forms are included in the curriculum of most Tang Soo Do schools, which are required study to earn the midnight blue belt. These hyeong are:

Kee Cho forms: Kee Cho Il Bu, Kee Cho E bu, Kee Cho Sam Bu. The Kee Cho series comprises basic patterns. these were created by Gichin Funakoshi, and named taikyoku in Shotokan karate.

Pyung Ahn forms: Pyung Ahn Cho Dan, Pyung Ahn E Dan, Pyung Ahn Sam Dan, Pyung Ahn Sa Dan, Pyung Ahn Oh Dan. The Pyung Ahn series was adopted from Okinawan and Japanese karate, where they are called Pinan/Heian and are the creation of Yasutsune Itosu, who also was one of Funakoshi's teachers.

Bassai (also known as Pal Che). The Bassai form is also from karate, where it is called Passai/Bassai Dai/Hyung, and was created by Okinawan Bushi Sokon Matsumura.

Naihanchi Some schools of Tang Soo Do include Naihanchi forms, such as naihanchi ee dan and naihanchi sam dan. .

Chil Sung or "Seven Star" Forms developed in 1952 by Hwang Kee, add a soft/ hard combination to the style, also incorporating/practicing more functional techniques like elbows, knees, shin-blocks, and others. Teaching these typically begins in the middle Gup ranks and continues into the Dans.

Yuk Ro or "Six-Fold path" Are a collection of 6 forms that were created in 1947 by Hwang Kee and develop advanced techniques. They are taught at some schools, primarily at the Dan level.

According to Hwang Kee, he learned these forms from studying Japanese books on Okinawan karate. Most scholars agree that the primary text Hwang Kee relied upon was Gichin Funakoshi's Rentan Goshin Toudi-Jutsu published in Japan in 1925.

However, almost all original 5 kwan instructors taught these same forms and had them in their curriculum as they were direct students of Japanese Karate masters, like Gichin Funakoshi or his contemporary peer Kanren Toyama, founder of shudokan karate; or they were friends and students of the other kwan leaders.

=== One-step sparring ===
One-step sparring (Il Su Sik Dae Ryun) techniques are best described as a choreographed pattern of defense moves against the single step of an attack. Usually performed in pairs, this begins with a bow for respect. One partner then attacks, often with a simple punch, and the other person will perform a series of prearranged techniques, often in a block-attack-takedown sequence. Despite the name, some of these techniques are illegal in tournament sparring due to moves such as shoulder strikes or back fist that could inadvertently hurt the opponent.

=== Other self-defense techniques ===
In some styles of Tang Soo Do there are techniques for defenses against grabs. In the World Tang Soo Do Association version of this, called Ho Sin Sul, there are 30 different grab defenses taught.

=== Free sparring ===
Though variation is extensive, Tang Soo Do free-sparring is similar to competitive matches in other traditional Okinawan, Japanese and Korean striking systems and may include elements of American freestyle point karate. Tang Soo Do sparring consists of point matches that are based on the three-point rule (the first contestant to score three points wins) or a two-minute rule (a tally of points over one two-minute round, but see also AAU Taekwondo point sparring handbook). Lead and rear-leg kicks and lead and rear-arm hand techniques all score equally (one point per technique). However, to encourage the use of jumping and spinning kicks, these techniques may be scored with a higher point value than standing techniques in some competitions. Open-hand techniques other than the ridgehand and leg sweeps are typically not allowed.

As in traditional Japanese karate-do kumite, scoring techniques in Tang Soo Do competition should be decisive. That is, all kicking and hand techniques that score should be delivered with sufficient footing and power so that, if they were delivered without being controlled, they would stop the aggressive motion of the opponent. There are also similarities between American freestyle point sparring and Tang Soo Do point sparring. Much of the footwork is the same, but the position of the body when executing blows is markedly different between the styles of competition.

Rapid-fire pump-kicking seen in American freestyle point sparring is sometimes used in Tang Soo Do competition. However, in order to score, the final kick in the pump-kick combination should be delivered from a solid base (with erect posture) and with sufficient power, or the technique is not considered decisive. Consequently, the pace of a Tang Soo Do match can be somewhat slower than would be seen at a typical North American Sport Karate Association (NASKA)-type tournament, but the techniques, theoretically, should be somewhat more recognizable as linear, powerful blows that are delivered from reliably stable stances and body positions.

Variation between Tang Soo Do competitions is extensive, but are typically standardized within the various associations. Because of the close historical relationship between Tang Soo Do and Taekwondo, many of the powerful rear leg and spinning kick techniques seen in both International Taekwon-Do Federation (ITF) and World Taekwondo Federation (WTF) Taekwondo matches are commonplace in traditional Tang Soo Do competitions. The main difference is that they are not delivered with full contact to the head in Tang Soo Do.

Tang Soo Do sparring is a contact event. Though often billed as "light" or "no-contact," the typical level of contact is moderate, being controlled to both the body and head (in dan divisions). Most Tang Soo Do practitioners feel that contact in sparring is essential to understanding proper technique and necessary for developing mental preparedness and a level of relaxation critical to focused performance in stressful situations. Unnecessarily or disrespectfully harming an opponent in Tang Soo Do sparring is not tolerated.

Health and longevity of practitioners are the major goals of Tang Soo Do practice. Consequently, serious injuries are counterproductive because they retard a level of physical training that is needed to foster emotional and intellectual growth. However, minor injuries, such as bumps, bruises and the occasional loss of wind may be invaluable experiences. Each match should begin and end with respect, compassion and a deep appreciation for the opponent. Though Tang Soo Do sparring is competitive, traditional competitions are more of an exercise, or way of developing the self, than they are a competitive and game-like forum. Introspection and personal growth are fostered through free sparring.

== Terminology and Korean commands ==
In Tang Soo Do, as in Taekwondo, commands and terminology to students are often given in Korean. However, beginning in 1955, and again in 1973, with the formation of the WT, Taekwondo became centrally governed and Taekwondo terminology was revised favoring Korean terminology. Tang Soo Do commands predate these revisions and many are based on Sino-Korean words.

Commands
| English | Hangul (한글) | Hanja (한자/漢字) | Revised Romanization |
|---|---|---|---|
| Ready | 준비 | 準備 | Junbi |
| Begin | 시작 | 始作 | Sijak |
| Stop | 그만 | | Geuman |
| Resume/Continue | 계속 | 繼續 | Gyesok |
| Return | 바로 | | Baro |
| Relax / At ease! | 쉬어 | | Swieo |
| Turn around | 뒤로돌아 | | Dwirodola |
| Yell | 기합 | 氣合 | Kihap |
| Look/focus | 시선 | 視線 | Siseon |
| By the count | 구령에 맞춰서 | 口令에 맞춰서 | Guryeonge majchweoseo |
| Without count | 구령 없이 | 口令 없이 | Guryeong eopsi |
| Switch feet | 발 바꿔 | | Bal bakkweo |

Hand Techniques
| English | Hangul (한글) | Hanja (한자/漢字) | Revised Romanization |
|---|---|---|---|
| Hand Techniques | 수 기 | 手技 | Sugi |
| Attack | 공격 | 攻擊 | Gonggyeok |
| ...Strike | 치기 | | Chigi |
| Block | 막기 | | Maggi |
| Punch/hit | 권 | 拳 | Gweon |
| Middle punch | 중 권 | 中拳 | Junggweon |
| Back fist | 갑 권 | 甲拳 / 角拳 | Gabgweon |
| Knife hand | 수도 | 手刀 | Sudo |
| To pierce / spear | 관 | 貫 | Gwan |
| Spear hand | 관 수 | 貫手 | Gwansu |
| Ridge hand | 역 수도 | 逆手刀 | Yeogsudo |
| Hammer fist | 권도 | 拳刀 / 拳槌 | Gweondo |
| Pliers hand | 집게 손 | | Jibge son |
| Palm heel | 장관 | 掌貫 | Janggwan |
| Elbow | 팔꿈 | | Palkkum |
| Gooseneck | 손목 등 | | Sonmog deung |
| Side punch | 횡진 공격 | 橫進攻擊 | Hoengjin gong gyeog |
| Mountain block | 산 막기 | 山막기 | San maggi |
| One finger fist | 일 지 권 | 一指拳 | il ji gwon |
| 1 finger spear hand | 일 지관 수 | 一指貫手 | il ji gwan su |
| 2 finger spear hand | 이지관수 | 二指貫手 | i ji gwan su |
| Double back fist | 장갑권 | 長甲拳 | Jang gab gwon |
| Double hammer fist | 장 권도 | 長拳刀 | Jang gwon do |

Foot techniques
| English | Hangul (한글) | Hanja (한자/漢字) | Revised Romanization |
|---|---|---|---|
| Foot techniques | 족기 | 足技 | Jok gi |
| Kick | 차기 | | Chagi |
| Front kick | 앞 차기 | | Ap chagi |
| ...also front Snap kick | 앞 차넣기 | | Ap chaneohgi |
| ...Snap front kick | 앞 뻗어 차기 | | Ap ppeod-eo chagi |
| Inside-out heel kick | 안에서 밖으로 차기 | | An-eseo bakk-eulo chagi |
| Outside-in heel kick | 밖에서 안으로 차기 | | Baggeso aneuro chagi |
| Stretching front kick | 앞 뻗어 올리 기 | | Ap ppeod-eo olli gi |
| Round-house kick | 돌려 차기 | | Dollyeo chagi |
| Side kick | 옆 차기 | | Yeop chagi |
| ...Snap Side kick | 옆 뻗어 차기 | | Yeop ppeod-eo chagi |
| Hook kick | 후려기 차기 | | Hulyeogi chagi |
| ...Hook kick | 후려 차기 | | Huryeo chagi |
| Back kick | 뒤 차기 | | Dwi chagi |
| ...Spin Back kick | 뒤 돌려 차기 | | Dwi dolyeo chagi |
| Spinning hook kick | 뒤 돌려 후려기 차기 | | Dwi dollyeo hulyeogi chagi |
| Knee strike | 무릎 차기 | | Mu reup chagi |
| Reverse round kick | 빗 차기 | | Bit chagi |

Stances
| English | Hangul (한글) | Hanja (한자/漢字) | Revised Romanization |
|---|---|---|---|
| Stances | 자세 | 姿勢 | Jahse |
| Ready stance | 준비 자세 | 準備 姿勢 | Junbi jase |
| Front stance | 전굴 자세 | 前屈 姿勢 | Jeongul jase |
| Back stance | 후굴 자세 | 後屈 姿勢 | Hugul jase |
| Horse stance | 기마 자세 | 騎馬 姿勢 | Gima jase |
| ...also Horse Stance | 기마립 자세 | 騎馬立 姿勢 | Gimarip jase |
| Side Stance | 사고립 자세 | 四股立 姿勢 | Sagorib jase |
| Cross legged stance | 교차 립 자세 | 交(叉/差)立 姿勢 | Gyocha rip jase |

Technique direction
| English | Hangul (한글) | Hanja (한자/漢字) | Revised Romanization |
|---|---|---|---|
| Moving forward | 전진 | 推進 | Jeonjin |
| Backing up / retreat | 후진 | 後進 | Hujin |
| Sideways/laterally | 횡진 | 橫進 | Hoengjin |
| Reverse (hand/foot) | 역진 | 逆進 | Yeogjin |
| Lower | 하단 | 下段 | Hadan |
| Middle | 중단 | 中段 | Jungdan |
| Upper | 상단 | 上段 | Sangdan |
| Two handed | 쌍수 | 雙手 | Ssangsu |
| Both hands | 양수 | 兩手 | Yangsu |
| Lowest | 최 하단 | 最下段 | Choe hadan |
| Right side | 오른 쪽 | | Oreun jjok |
| Left side | 왼 쪽 | | Oen jjok |
| Other side/Twist | 틀어 | | Teul-eo |
| Inside-outside | 안에서 밖으로 | | An-eseo bakk-eulo |
| Outside inside | 밖에서 안으로 | | Bakk-eseo an-eulo |
| Jumping / 2nd level | 이단 | 二段 | idan |
| Hopping/Skipping | 뜀을 | | Ttwim-eul |
| Double kick | 두 발 | | Du bal |
| Combo kick | 연속 | 連續 | Yeonsok |
| Same foot | 같은 발 | | Gat-eun bal |

Titles
| English | Hangul (한글) | Hanja (한자/漢字) | Revised Romanization |
|---|---|---|---|
| School Owner/Founder/President | 관장 | 館長 | Gwanjang |
| Master instructor | 사범 | 師範 | Sa Beom (Nim) |
| Instructor/(Teacher) | 교사/(선생) | 敎師/(先生) | Gyosa/(Seonsaeng) |
| Black Belt | 단 | 段 | Dan |
| Student | 급 | 級 | Geup |
| Master level | 고단자 | 高段者 | Godanja |

Other/Miscellaneous
| English | Hangul (한글) | Hanja (한자/漢字) | Revised Romanization |
|---|---|---|---|
| School | 관 | 館 | Gwan |
| Country Flag | 국기 | 國旗 | Guggi |
| Attention! | 차렷 | | Charyeot |
| Salute the flag | 국기 배례 | 國旗 拜禮 | Guggi baerye |
| Return | 바로 | | Baro |
| Pay respect / bow | 경례 | 敬禮 | Gyeongnye |
| Moment of silence | 묵념 | 默念 | Mugnyeom |
| Sit down! | 앉아! | | Anj-a! |
| Thank you | 감사합니다 | 感謝합니다 | Gamsa hamnida |
| Informal thank you | 고맙습니다 | | Gomabseubnida |
| You're welcome | 천만에요 | | Cheonman-eyo |
| Uniform | 도복 | 道服 | Dobok |
| Belt | 띠 | 帶 | Tti |
| Studio | 도장 | 道場 | Dojang |
| Test | 심사 | 審査 | Simsa |
| Self Defense | 호신술 | 護身術 | Ho Sin Sul |
| Sparring | 대련 | 對練 | daeryeon |
| Free sparring | 자유 대련 | 自由 對練 | Jayu daeryeon |
| Ground sparring | 좌 대련 | 座 對練 | Jwa daeryeon |
| One-step sparring | 일 수식 대련 | 一數式 對練 | il su sik daeryeon |
| Three-step sparring | 삼 수식 대련 | 三數式 對練 | Sam su sik daeryeon |
| Board breaking | 격파 | 擊破 | Gyeok pa |

== In popular media ==
American action movie star Chuck Norris was one of the most famous practitioners of the martial art.

In the Karate Kid franchise, Tang Soo Do serves the basis for the fictional Karate derivative called Cobra Kai, practiced by the villainous Cobra Kai Dojo, founded by John Kreese. (Note: The actor most famous for portraying him, Martin Kove, appears not to have been trained in Tang Soo Do. He has background in Okinawa-te Karate under prominent black belt Gordon Doversola Shihan.) In particular Johnny Lawrence, a central antagonist of the 1984 film and one of the central protagonists of the sequel series Cobra Kai is one of the most well-known fictional practitioners of the art. In both appearances, Johnny Lawrence is played by William Zabka, who was trained by Pat E. Johnson for the 1984 movie. Zabka later formally studied Tang Soo Do after the film's release.

== Notable practitioners ==
- Won-kuk Lee (founder Chung Do Kwan)
- Hwang Kee (founder Moo Duk Kwan)
- Hwang Hyun-chul
- Shin Jae-chul
- Peter Young Yil Choo (one of the founders of Kajukenbo)
- Chris Lytle
- Chuck Norris
- Aaron Norris
- Pat E. Johnson
- Don Nakaya Nielsen
- Hector Pena
- Marshall Teague
- Robert Wall
- Robert M. Goldman
- Pat Sabatini
- Steve McQueen
- Danny Bonaduce
- Dustin Stoltzfus
- Michael Jai White
- Conor McGregor
- Bruce Lee (Note: Asides Tang Soo Do, Michael Jai White also knows various forms of Karate.)
- Cynthia Rothrock (Note: Rothrock started Tang Soo Do at age 13. She received her 6th degree black belt in Tang Soo Do Moo Duk Kwan in 2006. She was tested by Grand Master Robert Kovaleski, 9th Dan and chair of the I.T.M.A., and was later promoted by him to 7th degree black belt in 2011 and 8th degree black belt in 2015. Asides Tang Soo Do, she practices various forms of Wushu.)
- William Zabka
- Robert Cheezic
- Jhoon Goo Rhee (Note: Started in Chung Do Kwan Tang Soo Do. Would eventually found Jhoon Goo Rhee-style Taekwondo.)
- Sun Hwan Chung
- Kim Ki Whang
- Keith Hackney
- Kyung Sun Shin
- Amanda Cerny
- Dennis Alexio
- Bruce Buffer
- Curtis Bush
- Bill Duff
- Omar Rosas
- Hwang Jang-lee (actor and instructor with the World Tang Soo Do General Federation)
- Joe Corley
- Druski

== Major organizations ==
- World Tang Soo Do Association
- World Dang Soo Do Union
- World Tang Soo Do General Federation
- World Moo Duk Kwan
- International Tang Soo Do Federation
- Worldwide Tang Soo Do Family
- Asia-Pacific Tang Soo Do Federation
- Tang Soo Do Mi Guk Kwan Assoc. - USA
- All Martial Arts World Alliance
- Hwa Rang World Tang Soo Do Federation
- International Martial Arts Association
- Intercontinental Tang Soo Do Organization
- Cheezic Tang Soo Do Federation
- Universal Tang Soo Do Alliance
- Moo Yea Tang Soo Do
- United States Tang Soo Do Association
- UK Tang Soo Do Federation
