= Hwang Kee =

South Korean martial artist (1914–2002)

- Born: 황기, 黄琦; November 9, 1914; Gyeonggi, Korea
- Died: July 14, 2002 (aged 87)
- Other names: Hwang Gi
- Nationality: South Korea
- Style: Taekkyon; Tang Soo Do; Shotokan
- Trainer: Yang Kook-Jin
- Rank: Grandmaster

Other information
- Occupation: Martial artist, Founder of Tang Soo Do/Soo Bahk Do Moo Duk Kwan
- Notable students: Hwang Hyun Chul, Shin Jae Chul, Kyongwon Ahn
- Notable school: Moo Duk Kwan
- Last updated on: 28.10.2020

Hwang Kee (Korean: 황기; Hanja: 黄琦; Hwang Gi; November 9, 1914 – July 14, 2002) was one of the most important and influential figures in the Korean martial arts. He was the founder of the school of Tang Soo Do Moo Duk Kwan style.

He was one of the five original Founders to open solely Korean Martial Arts Kwans, after the Japanese Occupation. In the 1970s Chuck Norris broke ties with him. His best student Pat Johnson made the International Tang Soo Do Congress and Mr. Norris made the American Tang Soo Do style. One of his famous quotes is “where there is preparation there is no fear” He was born in South Korea. He moved to China after World War II. He was taught the style of Wing Chun and Kung Fu. Later he settled in Japan and was taught the style of Shotokan. In maturity, he made the style of Tang Soo Do Moo Duk Kwan and applied all of his knowledge to the style.

== Martial arts training ==
Hwang Kee was born on November 9, 1914, in Jang Dan, Kyong Ki province of Korea, while it was under Japanese occupation. His father was a scholar and teacher, thus Hwang was one of the few young men in the province to complete high school in 1935.

He first studied martial arts, Taekkyeon while in school. Following graduation, he went to work for the Manchurian Railroad, where he claimed to have learned the martial art of Kuk Sool under Chinese Master Yang Kuk Jin, although some of his peers doubt this assertion. Master Won Kyuk Lee of the Chung Do Kwan, claimed that Hwang was a student at his kwan, gaining the equivalent of a green belt. Hwang disputed Lee's claim, and acknowledged only Yang Kuk Jin as his teacher. It is likely that Hwang Kee learned Yang style Tai Chi Chuan among other arts from Yang Kuk Jin, as the Tae Guk Kwon Hyung taught at upper levels is known in Tai Chi Chuan as the Yang style short form. Hwang returned to Korea from China in 1937, he wanted to continue his martial education, but the Japanese occupation limited his options. Throughout the 1930s and 1940s, while working for the Cho Sun Rail Way Bureau, he began to study Okinawan Karate by reading books available at the local library.

During the 1930s, Hwang Kee learned Taijiquan, Manchurian Shipalgi, and Guoshu. It was during this time that the Japanese occupied Korea, and the resident general, in an attempt to control the population, banned the practice of native martial arts, setting the penalty at imprisonment. In 1936, Hwang Kee attracted the attention of the Japanese secret police, forcing him to pack his bags and set out on foot for Manchuria, where he experienced scenes of lawlessness and destruction whilst working as a railroad worker. As a result, Hwang Kee decided to enter China, where he would live the next 20 years. He entered China at night from the southern end of the Great Wall of China, which he scaled and descended into China on the other side.

I climbed the wall at night, I was in excellent physical condition at the time and there were parts of the Great Wall that were lower than others. I ran up the side of the wall two or three steps and then grabbed at the top. Once on top, I distracted the soldiers guarding the other side by throwing rocks away from where I climbed down.

— Hwang Kee in an interview with Bob Liedke, translated by his son H.C. Hwang

At this time in China, it was hard for any martial artist to find a master willing to take them on as a student. Despite this, Hwang Kee became acquainted with Master Yang, who taught Hwang Kee the northern style Yang kung-fu (Nei-ga-ryu), a stronger and more passive art than the southern style that can be used at close quarters. Following the conclusion of World War II, Hwang Kee returned to Korea.

== Founding of Moo Duk Kwan ==
In 1945, grandmaster Hwang Kee formed his first school. Initially he titled his first school Hwa Soo Do ("Flowering Hand Way") Moo Duk Kwan, and his first two attempts at running a school were unsuccessful. In the early 1950s, he changed the name of his school to Tang Soo Moo Duk Kwan because Tang Soo (a direct Korean translation of Chinese and Japanese "China (or Chinese) Hand") was more familiar to Koreans from their exposure to Japanese martial arts. Much of the philosophy and many of the original forms (poomse) and techniques were direct derivations of Shotokan Karate, first created by Gichin Funakoshi. But Tai Chi Chuan and Shaolin Long Fist forms are taught in the upper levels of the style.

In 1957, Hwang claimed to have made several major discoveries in his reading the four hundred-page woodblock print Moo ye Do bo Tong ji. The Muye Dobo Tongji was a book commissioned in 1790 by King Jeongjo of Korea, which illustrated indigenous Korean martial arts. Hwang Kee incorporated these teachings into his Tang Soo Do discipline and renamed the art he created Soo Bahk Do. By 1953 and onward until 1960, the Moo Duk Kwan had risen to become biggest Moo Do organization in Korea, with close to 75% of all martial artists in Korea practicing Tang Soo Do Moo Duk Kwan. In 1960, the Korean Soo Bahk Do Association was incorporated and registered with the Korean government as the traditional Korean martial art.

During the 50th anniversary celebration of the founding of the Moo Duk Kwan in 1995, Hwang Kee officially renamed the art from Tang Soo Do Moo Duk Kwan to Soo Bahk Do Moo Duk Kwan.

After 1960, the Korean Soo Bahk Do Association experienced unfair political pressures. This was caused by a military revolution in South Korea. Hwang Kee faced two lawsuits against the government and won both. Since the Korean law says nobody is subject to double jeopardy, the Moo Duk Kwan future was secure

== Philosophy ==
A distinctive philosophical component of Soo Bahk Do and some Tang Soo Do systems is the inclusions of guidelines and principles of Daoism (Taoism), created by Laozu and developed by Confucius.

One philosophy that Hwang included throughout his art was that no one could ever reach perfection. This was visible in his decision to use the Midnight Blue Belt over the Black Belt. This was also due to the fact the Koreans thought of black as the color of death (it also meant perfection though humans are never perfect), but the midnight blue sky was limitless, just like the training and knowledge that one could practice in a lifetime.
