= JKF Renbukai =

Governing body of the sport karate

Japan Karatedo Federation Renbukai
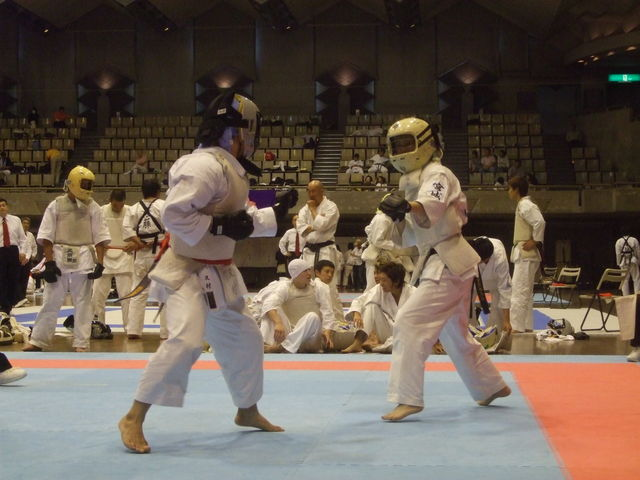
- 2008 National Tournament Team Battle
- Formation: 1964 (official as JKF Renbukai); 1945 (Kanbukan, unofficially)
- Type: Martial Arts and Combat Sports Organization
- Purpose: Bōgutsuki Karate, Kumite
- Location: Japan
- Leader: Akira Amari
- Website: All Japan Karatedo Federation Renbukai

Japan Karatedo Federation Renbukai (全日本空手道連盟錬武会; Zennihon Karatedo renmei Renbukai; JKF Renbukai; sometimes referred to simply as Renbukai 錬武会 in Japan) is a Bōgutsuki Karate organization.

It is one of the successors of the Kanbukan and is one of the oldest karate organizations in existence. The chairman is Akira Amari, and it is affiliated with the Japan Karate Federation

== History ==
=== Kanbukan ===
In early 1930, Kanken Toyama a native, returned to his country of origin to open his first dojo in Tokyo on March 20, 1930, named Shūdōkan (修道舘) meaning "The Dojo for the Study of the Karate Way".

When American GHQ announced the martial arts ban in 1945, students of Shūdōkan opened a dojo studio called Kanbukan (韓武舘) to avoid the ban. Attempting to create a more subtle name to disguise the organization, students used the name Kanbukan, which means "The Dojo of Martial Arts of Korea". The director was a Korean called Geka Yung (Dr. Yun Kwae-Byung), while a top student of Toyama called Hiroshi Kinjo was the instructor. He performed partner practice with direct blows using a Bōgu (防具 protector) from Kendo. This is Bōgutsuki karate.

In 1951, after the regulations by GHQ were relaxed, Norio Nakamura changed the name to Renbukan (錬武舘) at the Wenkai Society in Higashi, Shibuya. In 1954 Renbukan hosted the world's first national karate convention.

=== After Kanbukan ===
In 1959, with the purpose to nationally organize Karate, the organization established the All Japan Karatedo Federation (JKF) and made Shūdōkan its overall headquarters. The JKF appointed Choko Sai as chairman, Yasuhiro Konishi (Shindo Jinen-ryu) and Hiroshi Kinjo (Kanbukan) as vice-chairmen, Kanken Toyama and Hiroyasu Tamae (Otou-ryu) as Shihan, and Hironori Otsuka (Wado-ryu), Tatsuo Yamada (Nippon Kenpo Karate), Shinkin Gima (Shotokan-ryu), Isamu Tamotsu (Shorinji-ryu) and Tsuyoshi Chitose (Chito-ryu) as officers of JKF.

In 1964, JKF made a new united league of the non-contact karate world with JKA (Shotokan), Wado-ryu, Goju-ryu and Shito-ryu. Old JKF handed over the name of JKF (Japan Karate Federation) to the new league and changed its own name to Renbukai. Thereafter, Renbukai became a member of JKF as a group encompassing Bōgutsuki karate (防具付空手). This group also includes Koshiki karate (WKKF 硬式空手), Genwakai (玄和会), IPKF (International Protector Karate Federation 国際防具付空手道連盟), Shoko-ryu and Chito-ryu.

== Styles ==
The origin of Renbukai is Shūdōkan - a school name called Renbukai-ryu (錬武会流). It had been used in the past, but had no basis of origin. This is because Kanken Toyama said, "There is no style in karate (空手に流派無し)".

Toyama defined karate as "the martial arts to assume an ethical lesson controlling the offense and defense to protect the body by the karate that established the root in hardness and softness, Yin and Yang, the principle of the breathing, and to prevent an enemy a first priority".

In addition, dojo of various schools such as Shotokan-ryu, Goju-ryu, Shito-ryu and Shindo Jinen-ryu joined Renbukai since it is a competition group where the various factions of traditional karate can use the protector karate rule.

== Kata ==
=== Shitei ===
Renbukai registers five kata with JKF as designation kata (Shitei Kata).

- Naihanchi Sandan (ナイハンチ三段)
- Chibana Kushanku (知花クーシャンクー)
- Gusukuma no Chintou (城間チントウ)
- Matsumora Rohai (松茂良ローハイ)
- Kushanku (クーシャンクー)

=== Other ===
- Pinan Shodan (平安初段)
- Pinan Nidan (平安二段)
- Pinan Sandan (平安三段)
- Pinan Yodan (平安四段)
- Pinan Godan (平安五段)
- Naihanchi Shodan (ナイハンチ初段)
- Naihanchi Nidan (ナイハンチ二段)
- Bassai Dai (抜塞小)
- Bassai Sho (抜塞大)
- Maeda no Enpi (真栄田燕飛)
- Wanshu (ワンシュウ)
- Wankan (王冠)
- Chinte (鎮手)
- Souchin (壮鎮)
- Matusmora no Matsukaze (松茂良松風)
- Jitte (十手)
- Jion (慈恩)
- OhShiro no Seishan (大城十三歩)
- Gojushiho (五十四歩)

== Notes ==
1.Would-be founder of Jidokwan school, one of the nine kwans that would eventually bond together and found Taekwondo.
