= Kanbukan =

- Also known as: Hall of Korean Martial Arts
- Date founded: c.1945
- Founder: Few high ranking students of Kanken Toyama; Director: Yun Kwae-byung (c.1945-1949)
- Arts taught: Karate (all styles of Karate allowed), Kendo, Bogutsuki Karate

Kanbukan (韓武舘, roughly translated as "Hall of Korean Martial Arts" or "Korean Martial Hall") was one of the earliest Karate organizations founded in Post-War Japan and is considered the birthplace of the Bōgutsuki Karate.

The Kanbukan itself was a dojo that existed for only five to six years, but its influence on history of Karate and combat sports in general is immense. Its legacy is carried by various successor organizations, including JKF Renbukai.

== Overview ==
In early 1930, Kanken Toyama a native, returned to his country of origin to open his first dojo in Tokyo on March 20, 1930, named Shūdōkan (修道舘) meaning "The Dojo for the Study of the Karate Way." Kanbukan dojo was established in 1945 at Kudan (Chiyoda, Tokyo) by the high-ranking students of Shudokan under Kanken Toyama to practice and popularize karate while avoiding GHQ surveillance under the postwar martial arts ban. As a school, it inherits the non-school principle of Toyama's Shudokan, with art having direct lineage of Shuri-te of Anko Itosu. To disguise the intent of the dojo, the students used the name Kanbukan and named the Korean Shudokan practitioner Dr. Yun Kwae-byung as the director of the dojo. Therefore, making it possible to practice Karate and editorialize karate booklets without drawing unwanted attention from the GHQ. In 1946, students of Kanbukan started practising karate using kendo armor. In 1948, Kanbukan moved its dojo to Setagaya.

In 1949, Dr. Yun Kwae-Byung would return to Korea, influenced by the impending Korean War. In 1951, after the regulations by GHQ were relaxed, Norio Nakamura changed the name to Renbukan (錬武舘) at the Wenkai Society in Higashi, Shibuya. Later, when it developed into the (former) All Japan Karatedo Federation (current JKF Renbukai). In 1954, the National Karatedo Championships with Armour were held, marking the first major event involving Bōgutsukikarate.

== Organization ==
Kanbukan Dojo chiefly taught Karate, but also had open exchange between different martial arts and welcomed practitioners of both Japanese and Korean ethnicity. The Kanbukan offered traditional karate, innovative free-sparring (jiyu kumite), and bogu kumite (English: "sparring with protective armor"; Korean: hogu daeryon), as well as judo and kendo.

Kanbukan was a traditional dojo where people usually practice basic training and kata, and but it is the biggest feature was the use of kendo armor for kumite training, which allowed for full contact fighting.

Like judo and kendo, karate at that time considered the need for competition for the spread of karate, sought a method, and tried to use armor in order to achieve both safety and practicality.

== Notable people ==
- Dr. Yun Kwae-byung - served as director of Kanbukan. Was a high-ranking practitioner of Shudokan under Kanken Toyama. High ranking Shito-ryu under Mabuni.
- Mas Oyama - Founder of Kyokushin Kaikan and pioneer of Full Contact Karate.

== Successor groups ==
After Kanbukan closed, Renbukan continued Kanbukan's original direction and held the first national karate championship armored karate in 1954. In addition, it can be said that it had a great influence on the current karate world, such as developing into the Japan Karate Federation and the JKF Renbukai. The following two are the direct successor groups.

=== JKF Renbukai ===
A competition group based on the karate rules with armor. The National Karatedo Championships, which started in 1954, are now sponsored by this organization and continue to be the National Karatedo Championships with Armor.

=== Renbukan ===
Renbukan, which was founded by Nakamura, a high-ranking student of Kanbukan, still exists, has left the Renbukai, and is a member of the All Japan Koshiki Karatedo Federation (Chiba faction). In addition, in the form of taking over the "4th National Karatedo Championships," which was the last of the "1st National Karatedo Championships" of the All Japan Tournament, which was the first in the karate world sponsored by Renbukan in 1954, was the last in 4 times. Every autumn, the "Renbukan Karatedo Championships" are held in Asakusa.

=== In Korea ===
When Dr. Yun Kwae-Byung returned to Korea, he served as a professor at Seoul National University, taught karate at a judo hall called Chosun Yun Mu Kwan (朝鮮研武館) in Seoul. He would later open a kwan called Jidokwan, which would serve as one of the originators of Taekwondo.

== Legacy ==
Kanbukan itself was a dojo that existed for only five years, but it greatly contributed to the succession of the martial arts karate lineage by the Japanese immediately after the defeat, evading the GHQ's ban on martial arts.

Asides from being a pioneer in the competitive kumite and being the predecessor of JKF Renbukai, there were people who would later become important figures in the karate world, such as Mas Oyama, who were a disciples at Kanbukan.

By allowing direct hits, contrary to prior semi-contact rules of Kumite, Kanbukan and its Karate also influenced the birth of the Kyokushin – which was founded by Mas Oyama, who attended Kanbukan. And by birthing Kyokushin, it has guided the development of Full Contact Karate, Kickboxing and the modern combat sports in general.

Promoting bogutsuki karate with Yun Kwae-byung involved, Kanbukan has likely influenced Taekwondo's (particularly Kukkiwon's) practice of "hogu daeryon" (“sparring with protective armor”).

In addition, the "Karate Directory" (空手道名鑑 “Karatemichi meikan," ASIN B000J8AOK4) was published by Dr. Yoon Kwei-Byung when he was the director of Kanbukan.

The achievements of Kanbukan are immeasurable, as it laid the ground for the development of modern karate in posterity, not just the preservation of tradition.

== See also ==
- Kanken Tōyama
- Shūdōkan
- Kong Soo Do
- Taekwondo
- Nippon Kempo

== Notes ==
1.Regarding this, Kinjo Hiroshi said, "it was because Director Yoon was a Korean national and belonged to the privileged class as a third-country person at that time."
