= Mas Oyama =

Founder of Kyokushin Karate (1923–1994)

Masutatsu Oyama
- 大山 倍達
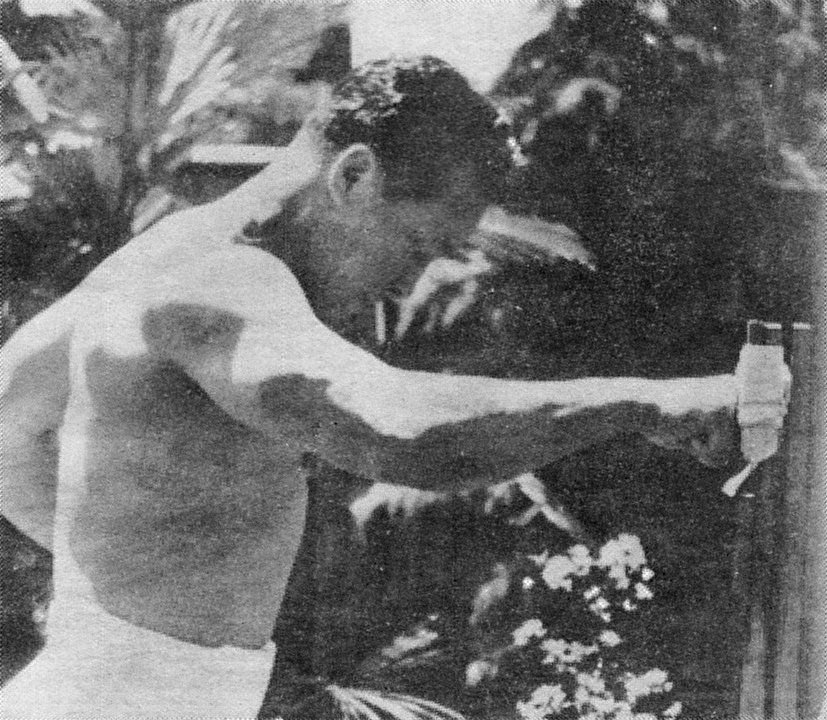
- Oyama in 1954
- Born: Choi Yeong-eui (Korean: 최영의); 27 July 1923; Kintei, Zenrahoku-dō, Korea, Empire of Japan (now Gimje, North Jeolla Province, South Korea)
- Died: 26 April 1994 (aged 70); Tokyo, Japan
- Other name: Choi Bae-dal
- Citizenship: Japan (after 1968)
- Style: Daitō-ryū Aiki-jūjutsu
- Spouse: Chiyako Oyama (1946–1994)
- Children: 3
- Martial arts career
- Height: 173 cm (5 ft 8 in)
- Style: Kyokushin， Aiki-jūjutsu，Judo，借力,boxing
- Teachers: Gigō Funakoshi, Kōtarō Yoshida, Gōgen Yamaguchi, Nei-Chu So (Note: Lived 1908-1996.)
- Rank: 10th Dan Black Belt in Kyokushin Karate

Other information
- Notable students: (see below)

Japanese name
- Kanji: 大山 倍達
- Hiragana: おおやま ますたつ
- Katakana: オオヤマ マスタツ
Transcriptions
- Romanization: Ōyama Masutatsu

Korean name
- Hangul: 최배달
- Hanja: 崔倍達
- RR: Choe Baedal
- MR: Ch'oe Paedal

- Kyokushin
- Hangul: 극진
- Hanja: 極眞
- RR: Geukjin
- MR: Kŭkchin

Masutatsu Ōyama (Note: 大山 倍達 (Ōyama Masutatsu)) (born Choi Yeong-eui (Note: Korean: 최영의); 27 July 1923 – 26 April 1994), commonly known outside Japan as Mas Oyama, was a Korean-Japanese karateka. He was the founder of Kyokushin Karate, considered the first and most influential style of full contact karate.

== Early life ==
Mas Oyama was born as Choi Yeong-eui (Korean: 최영의; Hanja: 崔永宜) in Gimje, Korea. At a young age, he was sent to Manchukuo to live on his sister's farm. Oyama began studying Chinese martial arts at age 9 from a Chinese farmer who was working on the farm. His family name was Lee and Oyama said he was his very first teacher. The story of the young Oyama's life is written in his earlier books. His family was of the landed-gentry class, and his father, Choi Seung-hyun, writing under the pen name of "Hakheon," was a noted composer of classical Chinese poetry.

In March 1938, Oyama left for Japan following his brother who enrolled in the Imperial Japanese Army’s Yamanashi Aviation School. Sometime during his time in Japan, Choi Yeong-eui chose his Japanese name, Masutatsu Oyama (大山 倍達), which is a transliteration of Baedal (倍達). Baedal was an ancient Korean kingdom known in Japan during Oyama's time as "Ancient Joseon".

One story of Oyama's youth involves Lee giving young Oyama a seed which he was to plant; when it sprouted, he was to jump over it one hundred times every day. As the seed grew and became a plant, Oyama later said, "I was able to jump between walls back and forth easily." The writer, Ikki Kajiwara, and the publisher of the comics based the story on the life experience Oyama spoke to them about – thus the title became "Karate Baka Ichidai" (Karate Fanatic).

In 1958, Oyama wrote What is Karate, which became a best-seller. It was translated into Hungarian, French, and English.

== Post-World War II ==
In 1945 after the war ended, Oyama left the aviation school. He finally found a place to live in Tokyo. This is where he met his future wife Chiyako (大山 置弥子) whose mother ran a dormitory for university students.

In 1946, Oyama enrolled in Waseda University School of Education to study sports science.

Wanting the best in instruction, he contacted the Shotokan dojo (Karate school) operated by Gigō Funakoshi, the third son of karate master and Shotokan founder Gichin Funakoshi. He became a student, and began his lifelong career in karate. To stay focused he remained isolated and trained in solitude.

Oyama later attended Takushoku University in Tokyo and was accepted as a student at the dojo of Gichin Funakoshi where he trained for two years. Oyama then studied Gōjū-ryū karate for several years with Nei-chu So (소 나이 추 / 曺（曹）寧柱, 1908–1996) who was a fellow Korean from Oyama's native province and a senior student of the system's founder, Chojun Miyagi.

At sometime between 1946 and 1950, Mas Oyama trained at Kanbukan, a dojo founded by high ranking students of Kanken Toyama known for its large degree of Zainichi Korean membership. Nei-chu So was also an active trainee at Kanbukan and likely taught Goju-Ryu to Oyama there. In Kanbukan, Karate was practised with Bōgu/protective gear (Bogutsuki Karate), which allowed for delivering strikes with full force, and may have influenced Oyama's full contact fighting mentality. However, sources say that Oyama had little interest in Bogutsuki Karate as a sport. Oyama did consider using protective equipment at some point though.

During this time he also went around Tokyo getting in fights with the U.S. Military Police. He later reminisced those times in a television interview, "Itsumitemo Haran Banjyo" (Nihon Television), "I lost many friends during the war- the very morning of their departure as Kamikaze pilots, we had breakfast together and in the evening their seats were empty. After the war ended, I was angry- so I fought as many U.S. military as I could, until my portrait was all over the police station." Oyama retreated to a lone mountain for solace to train his mind and body. He set out to spend three years on Mt. Minobu in Yamanashi Prefecture, Japan. Oyama built a shack on the side of the mountain. One of his students named Yashiro accompanied him, but after the rigors of this isolated training, with no modern conveniences, the student snuck away one night, and left Oyama alone. With only monthly visits from a friend in the town of Tateyama in Chiba Prefecture, the loneliness and harsh training became grueling. Oyama remained on the mountain for fourteen months, and returned to Tokyo a much stronger and fiercer karateka.

In the 1940’s, Richard Kim, another martial artist of Korean-Japanese lineage, introduced Oyama to Kōtarō Yoshida. Oyama and Kim trained together for years under the mentally and physically harsh teaching style of Yoshida. In “This is Karate,” Oyama referred to Yoshida as the greatest of all his teachers, whose “mastery of the arts can only be described as perfection.”

Oyama greatly credited his reading of The Book of Five Rings by Miyamoto Musashi (a famous Japanese swordsman) for changing his life completely. He recounts this book as being his only reading material during his mountain training years.

He was forced to leave his mountain retreat after his sponsor had stopped supporting him. Months later, after he had won the Karate Section of Japanese National Martial Arts Championships, he was distraught that he had not reached his original goal to train in the mountains for three years, so he went into solitude again, this time on Mt. Kiyosumi in Chiba Prefecture, where he trained for 18 months.

== Founding Kyokushin ==
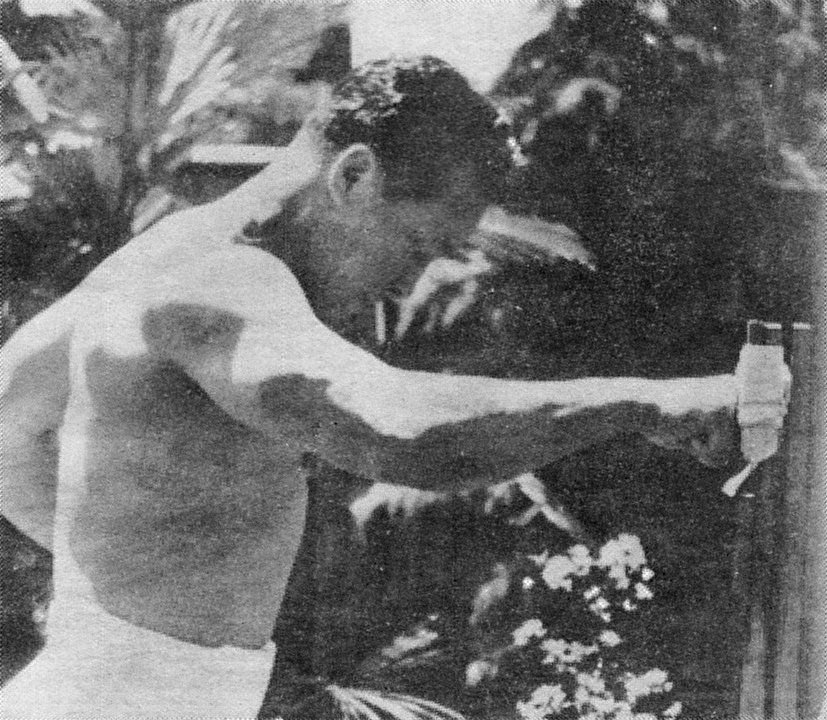
Mas Oyama karate practice in 1954

In 1953, Oyama opened his own karate dojo, named Oyama Dojo (form of Gōjū-ryū), in Tokyo but continued to travel around Japan and the world giving martial arts demonstrations, which included knocking live bulls unconscious with his bare hands (sometimes grabbing them by the horn, and snapping the horn off). His dojo was first located outside in an empty lot but eventually moved into a ballet school in 1956. The senior instructors under him were T. Nakamura, K. Mizushima, E. Yasuda, M. Ishibashi, and T. Minamimoto. Oyama's own curriculum soon developed a reputation as a tough, intense, hard-hitting but practical style which was finally named Kyokushinkai (Japan Karate-Do Kyokushinkai), which means 'the ultimate truth', in a ceremony in 1957. He also developed a reputation for being 'rough' with his students, as the training sessions were grueling and students injuring themselves in practice fighting (kumite) was quite common. Along with practice fighting that distinguished Oyama's teaching style from other karate schools, emphasis on breaking objects such as boards, tiles, or bricks to measure one's offensive ability became Kyokushin's trademark. Oyama believed in the practical application of karate and declared that ignoring 'breaking practice is no more useful than a fruit tree that bears no fruit.' As the reputation of the dojo grew, students were attracted to come to train there from inside and outside Japan and the number of students grew. Many of the eventual senior leaders of today's various Kyokushin-based organisations began training in the style during this time. In 1964, Oyama moved the dojo into the building that would, from then on, serve as the Kyokushin home dojo and world headquarters. In connection with this, he also formally founded the 'International Karate Organization Kyokushin kaikan' (commonly abbreviated to IKO or IKOK) to organise the many schools that were by then teaching the kyokushin style.

In 1961, at the All-Japan Student Open Karate Championship, one of Oyama's students, Tadashi Nakamura, at 19 years old (1961) made his first tournament appearance, where he was placed first. Nakamura later became Mas Oyama's Chief Instructor as referenced in Mas Oyama's book, "This is Karate." In 1969, Oyama staged the first All-Japan Full Contact Karate Open Championships which took Japan by storm and Terutomo Yamazaki became the first champion, which have been held every year since. In 1975, the first World Full Contact Karate Open Championships were held in Tokyo. World championships have been held at four-yearly intervals since. After formally establishing Kyokushin-kai, Oyama directed the organization through a period of expansion. Oyama and his staff of hand-picked instructors displayed great ability in marketing the style and gaining new members. Oyama would choose an instructor to open a dojo in another town or city in Japan, whereupon the instructor would move to that town, and, typically demonstrate his karate skills in public places, such as at the civic gymnasium, the local police gym (where many judo students would practice), a local park, or conduct martial arts demonstrations at local festivals or school events. In this way, the instructor would soon gain a few students for his new dojo. After that, word of mouth would spread through the local area until the dojo had a dedicated core of students. Oyama also sent instructors to other countries such as the United States, Netherlands, England, Australia and Brazil to spread Kyokushin in the same way. Oyama also promoted Kyokushin by holding The All-Japan Full Contact Karate Open Championships every year and World Full Contact Karate Open Championships once every four years in which anyone could enter from any style.

== Public demonstrations ==
Oyama devised the 100-man kumite which he is said to have completed three times in a row over the course of three days. Former students have repudiated this claim as mathematically and logistically infeasible for a number of reasons, including a lack of qualified opponents available at the time, but the myth persists.

He was also supposedly known for fighting bulls bare-handed. His students have claimed that he battled 52 bulls over the course of his lifetime, supposedly cutting off the horns of several and killing three instantly with one strike, earning him the nickname of "Godhand". This claim has also since been repudiated as legend-building by his former students. The one video recording of such an event has been confirmed by his students to have been staged, with students having already hammered an elderly bull's horn until it was loose, prior to the event. There are colloquial reports that he also wanted to fight a tiger, but was blocked by either the Japan Wildlife Conservation Society or the Japanese government itself, though few specific sources attest to this.

Oyama is said to have had many matches with professional wrestlers during his travels through the United States.

== Later years ==
In 1946, Oyama married a Japanese woman, Chiyako Oyako (1926-2006) and had three children with her. In the late 1960s, Oyama and Chiyako were having marital problems and decided to separate, and Chiyako, who did not want her husband to start seeing other women, arranged for a Korean woman and family friend named Sun-ho Hong to become Oyama's companion for some time. With Hong, Oyama had three more children and he would remain romantically involved with both Hong and Chiyako until the end of his life.

Later in life, Oyama suffered from osteoarthritis. Despite his illness, he never gave up training. He held demonstrations of his karate, which included breaking objects.

Oyama wrote over 80 books in Japanese and some were translated into other languages.

== Final years and death ==
Oyama built his Tokyo-based International Karate Organization, Kyokushinkaikan, into one of the world's foremost martial arts associations, with branches in more than 100 countries boasting over 12 million registered members. In Japan, books were written by and about him, feature-length films splashed his colourful life across the big screen, and manga recounted his many adventures.

Oyama died at the age of 70 in Tokyo, Japan on April 26, 1994, due to lung cancer.

His widow, Chiyako Oyama, created a foundation to honor his legacy.

== In popular culture ==
- Ryu from Street Fighter was inspired by Mas Oyama as game designer Takashi Nishiyama was a fan of his. The character originates from the kung fu series Karate Master by Ikki Kajiwara. As a child, Nishiyama enjoyed watching Ichidai's animated series, which was influenced by Oyama's life. Nishiyama was impressed by Oyama's martial arts skill and philosophies, which inspired him to create the first Street Fighter game.
- A manga about Oyama's legacy, Karate Baka Ichidai (literal title: "A Karate-Crazy Life"), was published in Weekly Shonen Magazine in 1971, written by Ikki Kajiwara with art by Jirō Tsunoda and Jōya Kagemaru. A 47-episode anime adaptation was released in 1973 which featured several changes to the plot, including the renaming of the Mas Oyama character to "Ken Asuka" (voiced by Nobuo Tanaka). A trilogy of live-action films based on the manga was also produced: Champion of Death (1975), Karate Bearfighter (1975), and Karate for Life (1977). The films featured Oyama's pupil, Japanese actor and martial artist Sonny Chiba, in the main role. Oyama himself appeared in the first two films. Another film adaptation, Fighter in the Wind, was released in 2004, starring Yang Dong-geun.
- During the 1970s, Oyama and some of his top students were featured in a documentary film The Strongest Karate (released as Fighting Black Kings in the US market) followed by two sequels, all having Ikki Kajiwara as executive producer.
- Takuma Sakazaki (a.k.a. "Mr. Karate"), a character from SNK's Art of Fighting and The King of Fighters series, was inspired by Mas Oyama. Within the mythology, Sakazaki is the founder and grandmaster of the fictional Kyokugenryu Karate, which is a nod to Oyama's own Kyokushinkaikan.
- The works of manga author Keisuke Itagaki feature at least two characters inspired by Oyama: Doppo Orochi from Baki the Grappler and Shozan Matsuo from Garouden.
- The Pokémon Sawk was inspired by Mas Oyama. Sawk's single eyebrow is also a remnant of its beta design, which included horns. Due to this, Sawk, alongside Throh, Tornadus and Thundurus, were all intended to be designed after oni. However, the designer of Throh and Sawk, Ken Sugimori, felt their colors made their design too similar to that of Tornadus and Thundurus, so the colors of Tornadus and Thundurus were changed, as well as Throh and Sawk's horns to eyebrows.

== Books ==
- What is Karate?, 1958. ISBN 0-87040-147-5
- This is Karate!, 1965. ISBN 0-87040-254-4
- Mastering karate, 1966. ISBN 9780448017471
- Vital Karate, 1967. ISBN 2-901551-53-X
- Advanced Karate, 1970. ASIN B000BQYRBQ ISBN 9780870400018
- Essential Karate, 1978. ISBN 978-0-8069-8844-3
- The Kyokushin way : Mas. Oyama's karate philosophy, 1979. ISBN 9780870404603
- Mas Oyama's complete karate course, 1998. ISBN 9780806988450
