= Bogu =

Bogu may refer to:

== People ==
- Bogu Kailai (born 1958), Chinese lawyer and businesswoman
- Bögü Qaghan, third khagan of Uyghurs

== Places ==
- Bogu (state)

== Other ==
- Bōgu, Kendo training armour
- Bogu kumite in Bōgutsuki Karate
- Bogu kumite in Seikichi Odo
