= Sang-kee Paik =

South Korean taekwondo practitioner

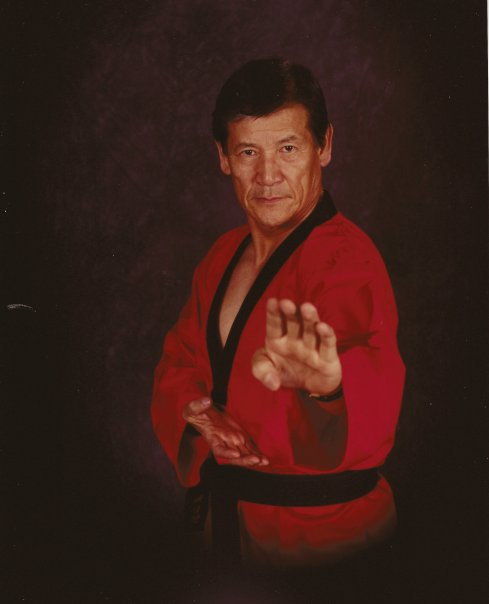
- Sang-kee Paik
- Born: August 21, 1929; Korea
- Died: July 12, 2009 (aged 79); United States of America
- Style: Sa-Sang Kwon Bup, Ch'uan Fa, Shudokan, Taekwondo,
- Rank: 10th "dan" founding grandmaster Sa-Sang Kwon Bup; also 9th dan Taekwondo (Kukkiwon)

Other information
- Notable schools: Paik's Oriental Martial Arts Institute, Paik's Academy of Martial Arts, Madison, Wisconsin

Sang-kee Paik (1929–2009), also known in Korean reference as Paik Sang-kee, was a South Korean martial arts grandmaster and creator of a Kwon Bup system he called Sa-Sang Kwan (Korean: school of the four natural elements: air, earth, fire, and water). Paik was one of the first pupils to receive the black belt under Yoon Byung-In, and Kim Ki Whang with whom he continued his training after Yoon's disappearance during the Korean War. Paik's system of Sa-Sang built upon the Ch'uan Fa (Korean: Kwon Bup) he had mastered under Yoon Byung-In, and included elements of Shudokan karate from both Yoon and Kim. Paik completed the system with his research into training effective kicking techniques. He created four primary forms (Korean: hyung), symbolizing each of the four natural elements. He also developed a rigorous philosophy unique to the system, and intended to be carried into one's everyday life.

== Biography ==
Upon completing his Ph.D. in animal pathology at Seoul National University, Paik moved to the United States in 1969 to work as a research pathologist at the University of Wisconsin's Primate Research Center in Madison, Wisconsin. In 1971, he opened Paik's U.S. Oriental Martial Arts Institute, and soon quit his research position to devote himself to teaching the martial arts.

In 1977, Paik purchased a former elementary school (Sunnyside Elementary) building in Madison and converted it to a training facility consisting of three gyms and live-in dormitories for serious students and staff. His intent was to create a unique "institution for higher learning in the martial arts". He renamed his school Paik's Academy of Martial Arts, and for the next 20 years taught thousands of students and conducted numerous "special weekend" sessions to train his black belt staff. These intensive sessions required early morning meditation, eight hours of hard training per day, all meals together and overnight camping in the gymnasium. Paik noted these sessions mirrored those he attended regularly under grandmasters Yoon and Kim in Korea.

Paik also maintained a relationship with the World Taekwondo Federation since its inception in 1973. He was selected to host the 1990 USA Taekwondo National Championships, the initial U.S. qualifying event for the 1992 Summer Olympic Games in Barcelona. This was the second Olympic Games to include taekwondo as a demonstration sport. The tournament was held in Madison, Wisconsin, at Veterans Memorial Coliseum of the Alliant Energy Center. In 1989, Paik served as director of the U.S. delegate team for the World games events leading up to the 1992 Olympics.

Despite his long traditional background, Paik was passionate about creativity and continued advancement in the martial arts. By the mid-1970s, he had developed and rigorously taught full independence of leg motion in kicking techniques (i.e. kicks to multiple targets before bringing the foot back to the ground). This was not done in traditional taekwondo or karate at the time. He also introduced a creative forms division at the 1990 USA Taekwondo National Championships to allow competitors to develop and perform their own personalized forms (Korean: Hyung). In a communication to lobby for this idea, Paik wrote, "With creativity, techniques become art; art becomes philosophy. While we must always respect and practice traditional form, we must also allow for the creative process to continue to advance the martial arts."

Paik retired from full-time teaching in 1997 at age 68 named as his successor son Peter, eighth dan, who continues to operate the school in Madison, Wisconsin under the name Paik's Traditional Martial Arts Center - School of Integrity.

Sang-kee Paik died peacefully surrounded by his family on July 12, 2009, after a long battle with cancer. His memorial service was held in Madison, Wisconsin on July 25, 2009, and attended by hundreds of his former students. Son Peter and daughter Myung (Mia) felt the best way to eulogize their father was to allow Paik's former students to speak at the podium. Many did, recounting what an extraordinary teacher he was and the positive and permanent impact he had on their lives. Also noted was Paik's penchant for taking in at-risk or troubled students, sometimes by offering free lessons and then turning their lives around through a mixture of benevolence and tough discipline.

== See also ==
- Ch'uan Fa
- Shudokan
- Korean martial arts
