= George Spiro Thanos =

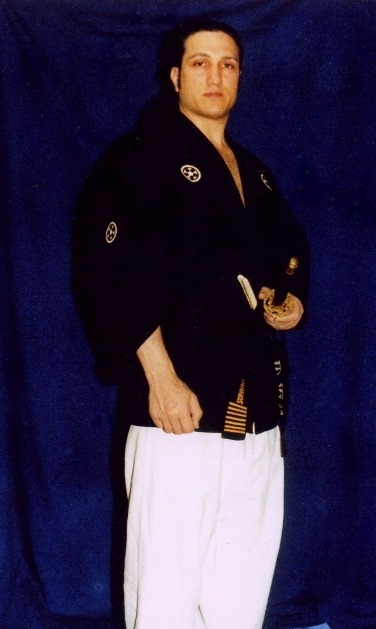
George Thanos,1995

George Spiro Thanos is a martial artist champion. Thanos was born in Bethesda, Maryland, in 1952. He began his martial arts training at the Kim Studio in Silver Spring, Maryland in 1965 at the age of 13.

== Junior martial artist ==
The world-renowned martial arts instructor Ki Whang Kim trained Thanos in Aikido, Yoshinkai style, and Taekwondo. In 1966 Thanos received his black belt in Moo Duk Kwan Tang Soo Do. Thanos dominated the Junior Division between 1963 and 1966. Here are a few of his significant titles

- Jhoon Rhee National Karate Championship, - Junior Division, 1965
- All-American Open Championship Madison Square Garden- Junior Division, 1966
- Universal Open Karate Champion, New York - Junior Division, 1967

== Senior division ==
In 1968 at the age of 16, Thanos stepped up to the Senior Division. A partial but instructive list of his titles includes:

- Jhoon Rhee National Karate Championship, 3rd Place - Lightweight Division, 1968
- U.S. Black Belt Champion, Ocean City, MD, 1973
- North American Pro-Am Tae Kwon Do Champion, 1974
- S. Henry Cho All American Open Champion, Madison Square Gardens, NY, 1975
- Battle of Atlanta, Atlanta, Georgia, 2nd Place - Lightweight Division, 1975
- Top Ten National Karate Championship, Anderson, IN, 1st Place, 1975
- S. Henry Cho All American Open Champion, Madison Square Gardens, NY - Heavyweight, 1976.
- First Penn National Full Contact Karate Champion, Harrisburg, PA, 1976
- All American Open Professional Karate Champion, Youngstown, Ohio, 1976.
- Sok Ho Kang Professional and Amateur Open Karate Champion, Huntington, W.Va, 1976.
- Jhoon Rhee Commissioner of Black Belt League, 1st Place - Light/ Heavyweight Division

== Career as a teacher ==
Following his extensive competition and training experience, starting in 1975, Thanos ran and taught at the Tae Kwan Do Moo Duk Kwan of America, Inc. in association with the Kim Studio of Karate in Myrtle Beach, SC. In the course of the 1970s, the Karate Illustrated Magazine dubbed Thanos as the "gray Ghost" in response to Thanos's fair complexion, swift footwork and ghost-like speed in competitions he had participated. Among the most recurring contenders against whom Thanos competed are Louis Delgado, Joe Hayes, Albert Cheeks, Gerald Robbins, Flenn Evans, Wayne VanBuren, Jacquet Bazemore, Alan Miller, Carl Beaman, Adolpho Velasco and Joe Lewis. At age 23, Thanos was the Grand Champion at the All American Open Championships at Madison Square Garden in 1975. This was the same title that the Karate legend Chuck Norris had won in 1967 and again in 1968. Thanos's long term close friend and trainer partner, Mitchell Bobrow, as a matter of fact, beat Norris in an exhibition fight. During this time, Thanos was inducted into the Professional Karate Association as part of the original crew of 50 exceptional martial artists of the realm. Following his induction into the PKA, Thanos held the world rating in the Light Heavyweight Division. In 1976, Traditional Tae Kwon Do Magazine awarded Thanos the world rating in the Light Heavyweight Division.

== Retirement and later life ==
Having taken over his family business of dry-cleaning and laundry in Washington, D.C., Thanos retired from Professional Karate Association and competing in professional fighting circuits in early 1980s. Though his decision to retire from martial arts remained final, his studies in the field continued as well his active participation in the training of the younger generations of martial artists.

At the Great Falls Bukokan, Thanos started his studies in Kenjusu, the art of wielding the Japanese sword in 1991. Master Ki Whang Kim awarded Thanos a 7th degree Black Belt in Tae Kwon Do in 1992. In the course of his pursuit of Kenjusu studies, Thanos received a Kyosei (Black Belt) from Sensei Fredirick Lovert. In 1998, Thanos opened a dojo (training studio) in Rockville, MD which specialized in Tae Kwon Do, Kenjusu and Aikido. At the Living Legends Award Ceremony in Washington, D.C., in 1999, Thanos received a special award and the recognition from Robert E. Everhart. Thanos and Mitchell Bobrow, both of whom started their martial arts careers at the studio of legendary trainer Master Ki Whang Kim, are the only two students of Kim to be awarded the highest ranked of 7th degree Black Belt by the Grand Master Kim. In 2009, Thanos was inducted into the Tae Kwan Do Hall of Fame and celebrated for his "reliance on not any one style of attack in his arsenal but an array of sweeps, punches, round and back kicks while integrating them into a continuous fury."
