= Japan Karate Federation =

Governing body of sport karate

Japan Karatedo Federation
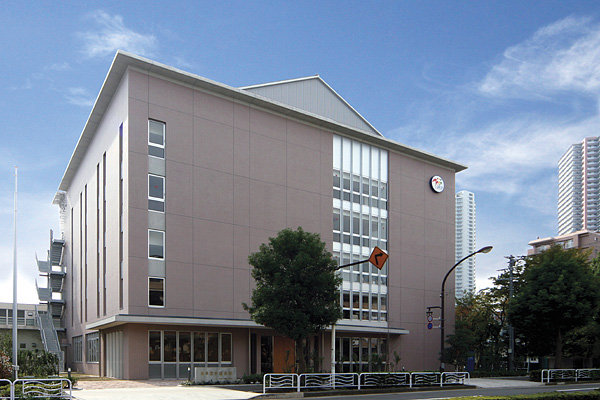
- JKF National Headquarters in Tokyo
- Abbreviation: JKF
- Formation: January 13, 1969
- Type: Sports National Governing Body
- Legal status: A public organization, approved by the Cabinet of Japan
- Purpose: Bringing unified order to Karate and development of karate as a sport in Japan
- Headquarters: 1-1-20 Tatsumi, Koto-ku, Tokyo, Japan 135-8538
- Location: Tokyo
- Region served: Japan
- Members: Japanese Olympic Committee; World Karate Federation; Japan Sport Association; Japanese Budō Association
- Official language: Japanese
- Chairman: Yoshihiro Sasakawa
- Website: Official Website

The Japan Karatedo Federation (JKF), a.k.a. Japan Karatedo Federation, is a national governing body of the sport karate in Japan. The JKF is officially affiliated with the Japan Olympic Committee (JOC), World Karate Federation (WKF), Japan Sport Association (JSPO), and Japanese Budō Association. The styles recognized by the JKF are Gōjū-ryū, Shitō-ryū, Shotokan, and Wadō-ryū. Its headquarter is located in Tokyo, Japan.

== History ==
=== Early years ===
In 1959, the original Japan Karate Federation, formally known as the Federation of All Japan Karatedo Organizations (FAJKO), was formed to be a unifying organization to bring karate schools together by the Karate world leaders. They were chairman Choko Sai, the head of the Shudokan of Kanken Tōyama, and vice chairmen Konishi from Shindō Jinen-ryū, Hiroshi Kinjo from Kanbukan, Otsuka Hinorori from Wado-Ryu, Tatsuo Yamada from Japan Kenpo Karate, and Shinkin Gima from Shotokan.

=== New Formation ===
On October 1, 1964, the original Japan Karate Federation, which changed its own name to Japan Karate Renbukai, handed over its organization name to the new united league, such as Gōgen Yamaguchi of Goju-ryu, Ōtsuka Hironori of Wadō-ryū, Nakayama Masatoshi of Shotokan, Mabuni Kenei and Iwata Manzao of Shitō-ryū, in addition to the Japan Karate Rengokai, which was founded by Ryōichi Sasakawa. This unified all the Karate organizations in Japan. Japan Karate Renbukai later changed its name to the JKF Renbukai, and then became an official member of the new JKF as a group, encompassing Bōgu uniformed Karate. Japan instilled "a uniform order in Karate", recognizing the four major schools, Goju-kai, Wado-Kai, Shotokan and Shito-kai. In 1967, Ryoichi Sasakawa became its chairman.

On January 13, 1969, the JKF was officially incorporated as a central umbrella body for the four partner organizations and recognized under the Cabinet of Japan. In December in the same year, the All Japan Karate Championships were held at the Nippon Budōkan in Tokyo. The JKF also works with organizations using the traditional styles of karate.

In October 1970, the JKF became a member of the World Karate Federation (WKF). On March 29, 1972, JKF became a member of the Japan Sports Association (JSA).

In 1978, the JKF first participated in the National Sports Festival in Matsumoto, Nagano. In 1981, Karate became an official game event of the National Sports Festival. Traditionally, karate organizations followed disparate competition rules. Japan Karate Association (JKA) attempted to standardize such rules. They addressed conflicts between the organizations that teach Kyokushin, a full-contact karate style, and other non-member organizations such as Seidokaikan.

On December 11, 2009, the JKF started building a new headquarters named the Japan Karate Kaikan in Koto-ku, Tokyo. The JKF became a member of the Nippon Budokan (Japan Martial Arts Council). The JKF has been officially participating at the Asian Games, East Asian Games and the IOC-sponsored World Games as an official competition. The construction of the new Japan Karate Kaikan was completed and opened in November 2011.

As a member of the Japanese Olympic Committee (JOC), the JKF has been putting efforts to include Karate into the Olympics as an official game along with other affiliated Karate organizations.

In May 2016, it was announced that The Emperor’s Cup and The Empress’s Cup will be given to the champions of Japan Cup Karatedo. The ceremony of notification was held at the Imperial Household Agency and the Emperor’s Cup and the Empress’s Cup were commissioned in the presence of Mr. Michiyasu Takahashi, Deputy Commissioner of the Japan Sports Agency on May 17, 2016.

On August 3, 2016, the IOC approved Karate as one of the five new sports for Tokyo 2020 Summer Olympics.

== Ranking system ==
The JKF officially recognizes the Dan, a Black Belt degree ranking system, from 1st Dan to 10th Dan and requires students to take a physical test up to 8th Dan. Since 2014, the JKF has also installed the additional basic ranking system called Kyū from 5th Kyū to 1st Kyū, and it requires a student to earn 1st Kyū first in order to earn 1st Dan.

=== Dan grades ===
- From 1st Dan to 3rd Dan
The test is conducted by the JKF affiliated Prefectural Federations that represent their Prefectures; other associations such as Japan Business Group Karatedo Federation, Japan University Karatedo Federation, Japan High School Karatedo Federation, or Japan Junior High Karatedo Federation; or the cooperation groups.

- From 4th Dan to 5th Dan

The Dan test for fourth and fifth are conducted by The Regional Council, All Japan Business Group Karatedo Federation and All Japan High School Athletic Federation Karatedo Division.

- From 6th Dan to 7th Dan

The test for sixth and seventh Dan is solely conducted by the JKF itself every November in Tokyo or Osaka.

- For 8th Dan

The test for eighth Dan is solely conducted by the JKF every March in Tokyo.

=== Dan examination ===
Dan examination consists of Kata and Kumite.

- 1st Dan to 5th Dan
The examination consists of two performances of Shitei Kata (designated kata) and Tokui Kata (selected kata) as well as two rounds of Kumite.

- 6th Dan

The examination consists of two performances of Shitei Kata (designated kata) and Tokui Kata (selected kata) as well as a written test.

- 7th Dan

The examination consists of performances of two Tokui Kata (selected kata) as well as a written test.

- 8th Dan

The examination consists of performances of two Tokui Kata (selected kata) as well as an essay written test.

=== Shitei Kata ===
Besides rank exams, many JKF tournaments also require the performance of 'Shitei Kata' (designated kata) in the first and second rounds, selected from a defined list that all examiners and judges should be familiar with. For each of the main four styles there are two kata to choose from in the first round (the 'daiichi shitei kata') and second round (the 'daini shitei kata') of any compliant tournament.

- For Shitō-ryū, the kata are Seienchin (セイエンチン), Bassai Dai (抜塞大), Matsumura no Rohai (松村ローハイ), and Nipaipo (二十八歩).
- For Gōjū-ryū, the kata are Saifa (砕破), Seipai (十八手), Kururunfa (久留頓破), and Seisan (十三手).
- For Shotokan, the kata are Kanku dai (観空大), Jion (慈恩), Kankū Shō (観空小), and Enpi (燕飛).
- For Wadō-ryū, the kata are Seishan (征射雲), Chintō (鎮闘), Niseishi (ニーセイシ), and Kūshankū (公相君).

== Competitions ==
=== Kumite ===
JKF Gojukai rules differ from the WKF rules.

== Members ==
=== Cooperative associations (Ryu-ha) ===
- Japan Karate Association (JKA) (Shotokan)
- All Japan Karatedo Shotokan (AJKS) (Shotokan)
- JKF Goju-kai (Goju-ryu)
- JKF Wado-kai (Wado-ryu)
- JKF Shito-kai (Shito-ryu)
- JKF Renbukai (Bōgutsuki karate)
- Karate Rengokai (Japan Karate Alliance) (The alliance of various factions)

==== Competition organization ====
- Japan business group karatedo federation
- Japan university karatedo federation
- Japan high school karatedo federation
- Japan junior high school karatedo federation

==== Amicable organizations ====
- International Karate Organization Kyokushin-kaikan (Full contact Group)

== See also ==
- World Karate Federation
- Karate in Japan
