= Yun Kwae-byung =

Korean martial artist

- Born: 1922
- Died: 2000 (aged 77–78)
- Other names: Yoon Kwe-byung, Yoon Kwei-Byung, In Giei, In Gekka, Yun Gekka
- Style: Shudokan Karate, Shito-Ryu Karate, Bogutsuki Karate, Kong Soo Do (Yun Mu Kwan)
- Teachers: Kenwa Mabuni, Kanken Toyama, Chun Sang Sup

Yun Kwae-byung (Korean: 윤쾌병; Hanja: 尹快炳; 1922–2000), alternatively Yoon Kwe-byung or Yoon Kwei-Byung, was a Korean martial artist and a notable figure in history of modern Japanese and Korean martial arts. He was the head of the influential Kanbukan Dojo, that would pioneer bogutsuki karate and full contact karate, as well as being the first headmaster of Jidokwan school, one of the original kwans that would eventually unite and found Taekwondo.

In Japan, his name is often transliterated as In Giei, In Gekka, Yun Gekka or other close variations.

== History ==
=== Early life ===
Yun was born in Korea in 1922 into what is believed to have been an affluent family, since he was sent abroad for his education during the Japanese occupation of Korea.

Yun started Karate under Kenwa Mabuni while attending secondary school in Osaka. Yun then attended Nihon University where he studied Shudokan karate under Kanken Toyama. He eventually received undergraduate and graduate degrees in veterinary medicine and animal husbandry.

After the end of World War II, various disciples of Shudokan tried to form a Karate school amidst the post-war martial arts ban enacted by GHQ. To get around restrictions, the students named the school Kanbukan (韓武舘, eng. "Hall of Korean Martial Arts"), and named Yun Kwae-byung, who had special status as a third-country person in postwar Japan, as the head of the dojo. This allowed the members of dojo to practice Karate freely, as well as editorialize Karate booklets without unwanted attention from GHQ.

In 1949, Dr. Yun Kwae-Byung left Kanbukan and returned to Korea, influenced by the impending Korean War.

=== Return to Korea ===
Upon his return to Korea, Dr. Yun Kwae-Byung served as a professor at Seoul National University, while also starting teaching Karate at Chosun Yun Moo Kwan (朝鮮研武館), a former Judo school now headed by Master Sang Sap Chun. Subsequently, the Korean War started and Sang Sap Chun disappeared during the conflict. After the war and disappearance of Master Chun, many of his former students eventually began training again at a different location. The former disciples of Master Chun formed the Jidokwan, with Yun Kwae-byung voted as the kwan's first president.

In mid-1950s, Yun Kwae-byung, the Jidokwan and the other kwans began discussions about uniting and promoting a singular art. Later during 1950s, Choi Hong Hi got involved and started spearheading the unification process that would eventually form the Korea Taekwondo Association. In early 1960s, Yun Kwae-byung started to become critical about the direction the younger generation of martial artist and teachers were going with Taekwondo and tried to sway Jidokwan out of the KTA. Eventually in 1967, younger members of Jidokwan led by senior instructor Lee Chong-woo voted Yun out, with Lee Chong Woo chosen as the new president and officially joining KTA and turning Jidokwan into Taekwondo school.

Yun Kwae-byung was effectively ostracized from Korean martial arts scene thereafter. Being an outcast to Taekwondo movement, he began focusing on business. Yun Kwae-byung died in year 2000.

== Legacy ==
Yun Kwae-byung is considered an innovator in jiyu kumite (Japanese: “free sparring”; Korean: jayu daeryon) and is also credited for "hogu daeryon" (“sparring with protective armor”) practice in Taekwondo.

== See also ==
- Jidokwan
- Kanbukan
- Kwan (martial arts)

== Notes ==
1. Mabuni was an Okinawan living in Japan teaching his brand of Karate which he called Shito Ryu. It should also be noted that Yun's study of Shito-ryu deviates from the way other founders of the nine kwans did, as they mainly studied Shotokan Karate under Gichin Funakoshi.
