= Bōgutsuki Karate =

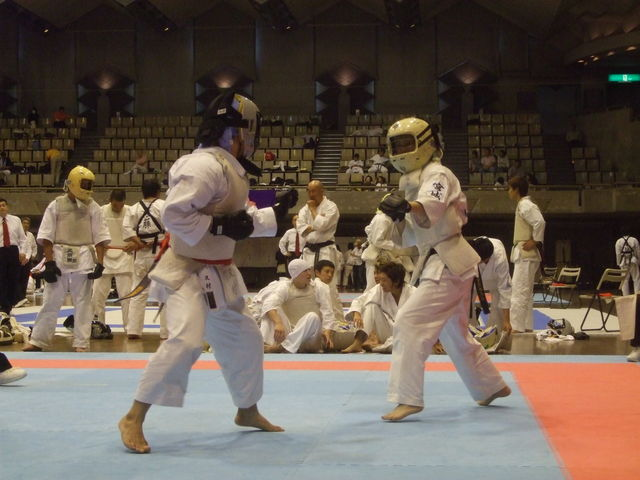
- Kumite competition of the national armored karate championship (Renbukai)
- Also known as: Bōgu karate, Armour Karate, bōgu-tsuki shiai, bōgu-tsuki kumite, Kumite with Armour
- Focus: Striking, Full Contact with protective gear
- Country of origin: Japan
- Creator: Either: The Karate Study Group of Tokyo Imperial University (Note: Earliest recorded practitioners); Kanbukan (Note: First organization to officially conduct the sport)
- Parenthood: Okinawan martial arts, Karate, Kendo (Note: Practitioners of Kanbukan used Kendo Bōgu as protective gear. Hence Bogu Karate.)
- Descendant arts: Kyokushin, Taekwondo (Kukkiwon/WT-Style), Kyeok Sul Do
- Olympic sport: No

Bōgutsuki Karate (防具付き空手 or ぼうぐつきからて, eng. Karate with Armour) is one of the competition formats of Karate. It is also known as bōgu karate (防具空手, Armour Karate), bōgu-tsuki shiai (防具付試合), bōgu-tsuki kumite (防具付組手, Kumite with Armour).

== History ==
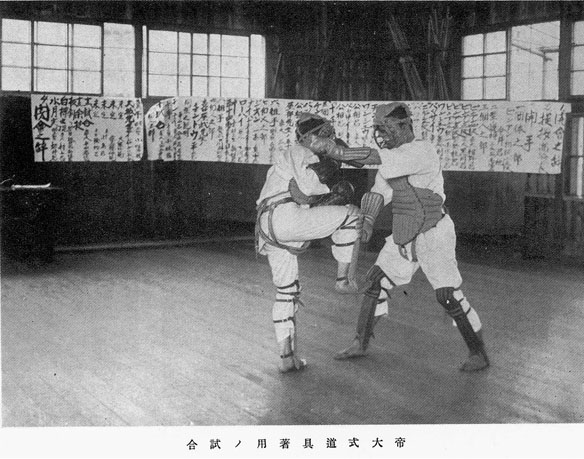
Karate match with armor from the University of Tokyo (Showa 4/1929)

Since 1922, when Gichin Funakoshi came to Tokyo to attend the first physical education exposition and began teaching karate, there have been attempts to turn kumite into a sport in mainland Japan. (Note: Unlike Okinawa Karate, which focuses on Kata and training mainly for young people and students.)

In 1927, The Karate Study Group of Tokyo Imperial University devised its own armoured karate system and began to practice sport Karate.

The group was headed by Hideo Bō (坊秀男, Bō Hideo), (Note: Would later become the chairman of Wadokai and a Japanese finance minister.) but Funakoshi, who was the Karate instructor at that time, became furious and the situation developed to a point where he resigned as the instructor of the University of Tokyo in 1945. The reasons of Funakoshi's forbidding use of Karate for fighting is unknown. According to early high school colleagues Hironori Otsuka (Wadō-ryū) and Yasuhiro Konishi (Shindō jinen-ryū), while teaching Karate, Funakoshi taught 15 kata and did not appear to know much about Kumite.

=== Post-war Japan ===
After the war, entities such as Kanbukan, Renshinkan and the Yōsei-kan (later Senkarakai), which would advocate "Bogu Karate" format, began to emerge.

Kanbukan (eng. Hall of Korean Martial Arts) was a "non-school" oriented dojo established by Kanken Toyama's high-ranking students with the purpose of avoiding the surveillance of the martial arts ban by GHQ. This was accomplished by making Koreans - who were "liberated" from the Allied Forces - act as instructors rather than the defeated Japanese. Kanbukan's first director was Yun Kwae-byung. Asides Karate, Kendo was also practised. When the Bōgu/Kendo gear was not used, they were used for Karate practice, thus serving the origin of modern Bōgutsuki Karate.

When the martial arts ban was relaxed, Kanbukan changed its name to Renbukan, and in 1954 held the "National Karatedo Championships", which was the first national tournament in karate history. They were held at Kanda kyōritsu kōdō (神田共立講堂, eng. Kanda Kyoritsu Auditorium) in Tokyo and used the Bogu Kumite ruleset. The tournament was won by Nobuyuki Suga. This tournament is still held by the Renbukai as the "National Armoured Karatedo Championships" and is the oldest association Karate tournament held nationwide in Japan.

In 1955, Shorinji-Ryu Karate Study Group Renshinkan Dojo (currently "All Japan Shaolin Ryu Karatedo Federation Renshinkan") was established in Kagoshima, Kagoshima Prefecture.

It was Kinjo Hiroshi (the former deputy director of Kanbukan) who led the spread of Karate in the postwar world, representing the Bogu Karate practised in Kanbukan and Renbukan. Businessman Cài Chánggēng was a proponent of Bogu Karate and supported in its spread. Mas Oyama often trained in Kanbukan and practised with Makiwara and so on. At this time, Oyama is said to have shown little interest in armoured karate.

In May 1959, the Japan Karatedo Federation (former) was established centered on Renbukan. Formed as a unified organization of karate that transcends schools, the headquartered Shudokan of Kanken Toyama. Its first chairman was Cai Chang-geng, with most of the executives during founding period being prolific Japanese martial artists. These included Vice Chairman Yasuhiro Konishi (Shindō jinen-ryū), Kinjo Hiroshi (Kanbukan), Advisor Hironori Otsuka (Wado-ryu), Tatsuo Yamada (Nippon Kempo), Gima Makoto (Shotokan), Director Isamu Ho (Shorinji-Ryu Renshinkan) etc. Following the foundation of organization, it hold the 5th Tournament of "All Japan Karatedo Federation Championship" on same month at Korakuen Gymnasium.

== Major organizations ==
- JKF Renbukai
- International Chitoryu Karatedo Federation

== See also ==
- Nippon Kempo
- Jidokwan
- World Taekwondo and Kukkiwon
