= John Critzos II =

American martial artist

John Critzos, II
- Born: Norfolk, VA, US
- Other names: "Wild Horse", from C.S. Kim of Pittsburgh
- Nationality: Greek-American
- Height: 6 ft 4 in (1.93 m)
- Division: Heavyweight
- Style: Karate-do
- Fighting out of: Kim Studio Silver Spring, MD
- Trainer: Kim Ki Whang
- Rank: 8th degree black belt
- Years active: 1973–1994

Other information
- Website: http://www.critzos.com

John Critzos II is an American martial arts fighter, champion, and instructor who teaches martial arts at the United States Naval Academy. He is also a practicing personal injury lawyer.

== Biography ==
Critzos was the last champion trained by Kim Ki Whang, and was known for his close relationship to Kim (most believe him to be the son Kim never had and that Kim became his surrogate father). Critzos gave the eulogy at Kim's funeral at the request of Kim's wife and daughter. Today, Kim's uniform, training sticks and belt hang in Critzos' private dojo, along with two authentic 19th century Samurai coats of armor and a Samurai sword from the 1800s. Critzos began his training with Kim on September 4, 1973. He continued under Kim's tutelage until September 16, 1993, when Kim died. Presently, he is the coach of the United States Naval Academy Karate-do team, a program he founded in 1992. Further, he is an attorney practicing law in the Washington, D.C. area. He concentrates his practice on serious personal injuries and auto accidents, and is the head of his firm which has two offices in the D.C. area.

== Competition career ==
During his competition career, Critzos was successful in the traditional martial arts circuit from 1979 to 1985 when he retired amid controversy which was written about by Black Belt Magazine in an article entitled "Traditional Controversy". The article exposed the widely known, but rarely talked about judging flaws and abuses that existed on the traditional circuit. It also led to changes to curb the abuses. As explained in the article, when faced with the alternatives of maintaining a higher standard or turning a blind eye for the sake of winning, Critzos chose the higher road. Today, he stands by his decision. He came out of retirement in 1989 for a single appearance and won the All American Open in Madison Square Garden for the 5th time as Heavyweight Champion. This was the last year that the All American was held in Madison Square Garden and therefore, Critzos was the last heavyweight champion to win in the Garden. He came out of retirement again in 1994 to win the U.S. Open for the 5th time as Heavyweight/Grand Champion at the age of 39. During his career, he also won the All American Invitational 5 times as Heavyweight Champion/2 time Grand Champion; the All American Open 5 times as Heavyweight Champion; the U.S. Open 5 times as Heavyweight Champion/Grand Champion, the Eastern Regionals twice as Heavyweight Champion/Grand Champion; the North American Championships as Heavyweight Champion/Grand Champion; the Keystone State Championships, Ki Yun Yi's National Championships, and numerous other traditional style contests as Heavyweight Champion/Grand Champion. He did not compete on the American Circuit, but rather confined his career to the Traditional Circuit which he believed had a higher level of competition. He has been inducted into Henry Cho's All American Open Hall of Fame, The United States Naval Academy Karate-do Hall of Fame, The Keystone State Championships Hall of Fame, the Tae Kwon Do Hall of Fame (Outstanding Player & Outstanding Leadership), and the Hellenic Hall of Fame, which is the largest ethnic hall of fame in the world. He was featured on the cover of Official Karate Magazine in which he demonstrated some of his winning techniques. Presently, he is the head instructor of the United States Naval Academy Karate-do Team, which he founded in 1992. He is the only student of Kim that has chosen to progress in belt rank one degree at a time as opposed to jumping degrees in an effort to speed the enhancement of his standing, and is an 8th degree black belt. Further, he has only accepted his advancement from contemporaries of his instructor. His first 5 Black Belt Degrees were awarded by Kim. After Kim's death on September 16, 1993, he was awarded a 6th degree by S. Henry Cho and a 7th degree by Sok Ho Kang. The 7th degree was awarded in April 2009 at an examination that was held at the United States Naval Academy and is the highest rank to ever have been awarded at one of the Military Academies in the United States. This examination was attended by numerous dignitaries from around the country as well as the Commandant of Midshipmen. Grand Master Jon Chung Kim of Allentown, Pennsylvania awarded him an 8th degree in 2014. He has followed in his instructor's footsteps in that he has produced numerous champions, still adheres to the traditional style of focused training and advances the philosophical perspective of the warrior.

== Education ==
Critzos graduated the University of Maryland in 1980 with a BA in Economics and a BS in Finance. He was a double degree major. He went on to George Washington University and enrolled in the MBA program focusing on Finance. Prior to completing his master's degree, he was accepted into George Mason University's School of Law. He accepted the invitation and graduated with his Juris Doctor degree in 1984.
