= Kim Ki-whang =

Korean martial artist

- Born: Kim Ki-whang; 1920; Seoul, South Korea
- Died: September 16, 1993 (aged 73); Silver Spring, Maryland, United States
- Other names: Ki-whang Kim
- Nationality: Korean
- Style: Taekwondo; Tang Soo Do; Shudokan Karate-do; Judo Aikido
- Trainer: Kanken Toyama
- Rank: 10th dan Taekwondo, 8th dan Tang Soo Do, 4th dan Shudokan Karate, black belt Kodokan Judo

Other information
- Occupation: Master Martial Art Instructor
- University: Nihon University
- Children: Lina Kim
- Notable students: Mitchell Bobrow, Sang Kee Paik, Chuck Norris, George Thanos, Mike Warren, John Critzos II

- Kim Ki-whang
- Hangul: 김기황
- RR: Gim Gihwang
- MR: Kim Kihwang

Kim Ki-whang (1920 – September 16, 1993), also known in the United States as Ki-whang Kim, was a Korean martial arts grandmaster. He was chairman in the US of the Tang Soo Do Moo Duk Kwan Association and chairman of the US Olympic Taekwondo team in 1988. He helped unify several Korean martial arts into the overall style of taekwondo.

== Biography ==
Kim was born in Seoul in 1920, when Korea was occupied by Japan. Under the Japanese, martial arts were not allowed from 1909, though taekkyon was not banned until the year of Kim's birth.

Despite the ban, Koreans still practiced martial arts in secret, and Kim studied judo at the Kodokan Judo Institute from 1931, earning a black belt five years later. The ban did not extend to Korean residents of Japan, and Kim learned Shudokan karate from its founder Kanken Toyama at Nihon University in Japan. He became captain of the team, got the nickname "Typhoon" and earned a fourth-degree black belt in this style. He also went to China for two years, probably as a draftee in the Japanese army, where he learned kempo and Shaolin kung fu.

After graduating from Nihon in the 1940s, he returned home and worked at the Transportation Administration in Seoul. Though not involve in martial arts at the time, he remained good friends with a senior student from Shudokan karate, Yoon Byung-In. Upon the overthrow of South Korean President Rhee Syng-man, Kim accepted a letter of recommendation from Moo Duk Kwan founder Hwang Kee to be the school's representative in the United States.

In 1963, Kim emigrated to the United States, where he remained for the rest of his life. His students there included Mitchell Bobrow, Richard Chun, Albert Cheeks, Michael Warren, James K. Roberts Jr., John Critzos II and George Thanos. He taught more than 25,000 students and awarded 424 black belts. He had a wife and a daughter and retired in 1992.

Five grandmasters awarded Kim a 10th-degree black belt while he was hospitalized with liver cancer at age 73; he died on 16 September 1993. Kim was highly respected in martial arts as more than 650 people attended his funeral. He was inducted into the Taekwondo Hall of Fame in 2009.

== Other sources ==
- Taekwondo Hall of Fame
- Burdick, Dakin (1997) Journal of Asian Martial Arts, Volume 6 Number 1 - 1997. People and Events of Taekwondo's Formative Years
- Corcoran, John. "Memorial for Grandmaster Kim Ki-whang (1920-1993)." Inside Tae Kwon Do, 3:1 (Feb. 1994), pp. 56–59.
- US Taekwondo Grandmasters Society 4th Annual Hall of Fame Awards, 2009, "Pioneer Award" section detailing career.
