= Jidokwan =

Taekwondo schools or kwan teaching

Taekwondo Jidokwan
- Founder: Sang Sup Chun (Yun Moo Kwan founder); Dr. Yun Kwae-byung (first headmaster of Jidokwan)
- Current head: Sung Wan Lee
- Arts taught: Taekwondo (c.1955-1961 onwards, Kukkiwon system adopted in 1973)
- Ancestor arts: Gwonbeop, Kong Soo Do
- Official website: Taekwondo Jidokwan

- Jidokwan
- Hangul: 지도관
- Hanja: 智道館
- RR: Jidogwan
- MR: Chidogwan

Jidokwan is one of the original nine schools of the modern Korean martial arts that became Taekwondo and was founded in what is now South Korea at the end of World War II. Its name translates as "School of Wisdom". The Jidokwan in Korea still exists today. It functions as a social fraternal order. Jidokwan supports and endorses the Kukkiwon method of Taekwondo, and supports World Taekwondo (formerly the World Taekwondo Federation).

== Etymology ==
Jidokwan means "the Way of Wisdom School" with "ji" (지) = wisdom, "do" (도) = way and "kwan" (관) meaning either hall, school or institute, depending on context.

== History ==
The foundations of what was to eventually become Jidokwan were laid down by GM CHUN Sang Sup, who was one of the earliest Koreans to bring Japanese karate back to his homeland.

When he was seventeen years old, GM Chun relocated to Japan to attend College at Takushoku University in Japan, where he took up Shotokan karate under Gichin Funakoshi Sensei, the founder of that system and one of the first to bring karate (originally an Okinawan martial art) to Japan.

Upon GM Chun's return to his native Korea, he began teaching this fighting art at the Chosun Yun Moo Kwan school of Judo (朝鮮硏武館 拳法部), one of the few martial arts schools the Japanese occupying forces allowed to remain open during the period of their military occupation of that country.

At this time, GM Chun became very close with another Korean practitioner of the Okinawan/Japanese fighting arts, GM Yoon Byung-In, who was said to have also studied Ch'uan-fa (another word for Kung-fu) in Manchuria. GM Yoon eventually became a Shudokan karate "Shihan" (Sabum or teacher) under Kanken Tōyama Sensei while studying in Japan. Toyama Sensei was a colleague and fellow martial artist of Funakoshi Sensei, although he did not consider the karate he was teaching to be a distinct style that differed in form or substance from the generic brand of Shuri-based karate (derived from the Shuri district in Okinawa where it initially evolved) that Funakoshi Sensei had introduced to Japan and which was eventually named Shotokan by Funakoshi Sensei's successors.

GM Chun and GM Yoon traveled extensively together to train with other martial artists in Manchuria (northern China). They trained with each other so much that they came to be thought of as brothers. GM Yoon taught at GM Chun's Choson Yun Moo Kwan Kwon Bup Bu (권법무) for about six months before opening his own club, which he called the YMCA Kwon Bop Bu. GM Yoon's YMCA club later became the Chang Moo Kwan, which was founded by his most senior students, including GM Lee Nam Suk.

During the Korean War, all schools of martial arts were closed in Korea, including the Chosun Yun Moo Kwan. Both GM Chun Sang-Sup and GM Yoon Byung-In both vanished during the conflict. After the war, the Chosun Yun Moo Kwan Kwo Bup Bu program (sometimes "Yun Mu Kwan") school was restarted with new teachers and a new name, Ji Do Kwan (or "Jidokwan"). Chun's former disciples voted Dr. Yun Kwae-byung, who had background as the director of the Kanbukan, as the first headmaster of Jidokwan.

Jidokwan was subsequently absorbed into the newly unified Korean system of Tae Kwon Do (Taekwondo), which translates as the Way of Foot and Fist, so that it ceased to exist as a distinct style of Korean "karate." However, Jidokwan still exists in Korea today as a fraternal order which endorses the Kukkiwon martial arts system and supports World Taekwondo. There are still branches of the old Yun Moo Kwan style practicing today although in some cases they may only be using the old "Yun Moo Kwan" name. Some have gone their own way, with many adopting taekwondo-like formats and methods while others have ranged farther afield (e.g., Nabi Su, a modern hybrid style that traces its roots back to the old 'Yun Moo Kwan' style although it's hardly recognizable as a form of traditional Korean karate today).

== Philosophy ==
Taekwondo Jidokwan's philosophy is as follows (as published in the 2006 Jidokwan 60th Anniversary Handbook):

Leadership (Jidoja)

1. A leadership imbued with wisdom and refinement.

2. A courageous activist who thinks before his action.

3. A patriot who is devoted to the welfare of his/her nation.

The objectives of Instructor Education

1. To help maintain self-perfection which is respected by the public.

2. To help form an avant-garde in organizing national force to stop the aggressors.

3. To help achieve ideological innovation in taekwondo spirit.

4. To help actively participate in the service to the public for the community development.

5. To help foster high hopes and great ambition by encouraging savings.

The Spirit of the Eight Manners of Solemnity

1. View Rightly

2. Feel Rightly

3. Think Rightly

4. Speak Rightly

5. Order Rightly

6. Contribute Rightly

7. Have Ability

8. Conduct Rightly

Credo of Taekwondo Jidokwan

1. Taekwondo for myself.

2. Taekwondo for the Jidokwan.

3. Taekwondo for our country.

Jidokwan Pledge

1. I will observe the rules and absolutely obey the order of Jidokwan.

2. I will attain physical and mental discipline in the spirit of Jidokwan.

3. I will devote myself to the creation of new tradition and achievement of Jidokwan.

== Notable Practitioners ==
- Hyung Ro Lee
- Herb McGuire
- Yeon Hee Park
- Yeon Hwan Park¨
- LEE Jong soo
- OH Jung Myung - An early Taekwondo pioneer from Jidokwan in Melbourne, Australia, and the first Australian to be graded to 10th Dan by the Kukkiwon (May 2024).

== Notes ==
1.GM Chun Sang-Sup was never heard from again. GM Yoon Byung-In had defected over to North Korean side with his elder brother - a North Korean army officer - and died of lung cancer on April 3, 1983 in Chongjin, North Hamgyong Province.
2.Kanbukan was a dojo in Japan run by Shudokan practitioners/disciples of Kanken Toyama. It was conceived during postwar ban on martial arts in Japan after World War II and the students chose Dr. Yun Kwae-byung as the director due to his special status as a third-country person in postwar Japan to avoid the school from being closed. Kanbukan is known as the birthplace of Bogutsukikarate, a type of karate practised with protective gear and may have influenced the use of protective gear in (Kukkiwon) Taekwondo sparring.
