= Shūdōkan =

Japanese school of karate developed by Kanken Toyama

- Focus: Striking
- Country of origin: Japan
- Creator: Kanken Toyama
- Parenthood: Okinawan martial arts (Shuri-te), Taijiquan, Chinese martial arts
- Descendant arts: Taekwondo, Kong Soo Do (Yun Mu Kwan and YMCA Kwon Bop Bu/Chang Moo Kwan), Hapkido, Bogutsuki Karate

Shudokan (修道館, Shūdōkan), literally "hall for spiritual discipline," is a Japanese school of karate developed by Kanken Toyama (1888 – 1966). It was the total headquarters of Japan Karate Federation (old). Characteristics of Shudokan karate include large circular motions with an emphasis on covering and its own unique kata.

== History ==
Toyama Kanken

Toyama's karate training began at the age of nine in 1897 with Itarashiki, although he studied with Yatsusune Itosu for 18 years, until the latter's death in 1915. In 1907 Toyama was appointed "shihandai" (assistant master) to Itosu at the Okinawa Teacher's College, and he and Gichin Funakoshi, who later developed Shotokan karate, were the only two students to be granted the title of shihanshi (protégé).

In 1924 Toyama moved his family to Taiwan, where he taught in an elementary school and studied Chinese Ch'uan Fa, which included Taku, Makaitan, Rutaobai, and Ubo from teachers Chen Fo-Chai (陳佛濟) and Lin Hsien-Tang (林献堂).

In early 1930 he returned to Japan and on March 20, 1930, he opened his first dojo in Tokyo. He named his dojo Shu Do Kan meaning "the hall for the study of the karate way." Toyama taught what he had learnt from Itosu and the Ch'uan Fa and did not claim to have originated a new style of karate. In 1946, Toyama founded the All Japan Karate-Do Federation (AJKF) with the intention of unifying the various forms of karate of Japan and Okinawa under one governing organization.

As Toyama did not view the Shu Do Kan as a distinct style of karate, but merely a place for training, he did not appoint a successor. Thus, the organization he founded fragmented after his death in 1966, although his student Toshi Hanaue maintained the original Shu Do Kan. A few other schools based on Toyama's teachings still exist such as Doshinkan. Today, a minimal overseeing of the Toyama lineage of Karate is done by Kanken Toyama's son, Ha Toyama.

== Overview ==
Shudokan learning is based on three factors: Katas, fighting alone and fighting in a group.

=== Kata ===
Shudokan employs following kata:

- Rohai
- Seiru
- Kyoku series: Shodan, Nidan, Sandan, Yondan, Godan, Rokudan, Shichidan
- Taikyoku series: Shodan, Nidan, Sandan
- Empi Iwa
- Empi Taki
- Penpei
- Penpo
- Shimpatan
- Shimpasho

== Shudokan Today ==
Shudokan karate today is essentially a compound system, including Kobudo (i.e. "ancient art," referring to the specialized weapons practice of traditional Okinawan karate) and Shorin-Ryu (also known as Itosu-ha). Many other principles from other styles have found their way into Shudokan as it was Toyama's wish that Shudokan not stagnate, that it should grow in efficiency and flourish.

== Influence on Taekwondo via Korean students ==
Four of the nine schools (or Kwan's (Kan)) that merged to form Taekwondo have lineages that trace back to Toyama through three Korean men who trained in Japan while Korea was under Japanese occupation. These three men were Kim Ki Whang, Yun Kwae-byung, and Yoon Byung-In. Yun and Yoon both trained with Toyama and are both listed in his student role books as "Shihan."

Both these men taught a mixture of Toyama's methods along with the Chuan Fa they learned in Manchuria, before the Taekwondo unification movement. At that time, they founded Tang Soo Do or Kong Soo Do schools in Korea.

The first Kwan (Kan) where they worked as teachers was the Yunmookwan (later: Jidokwan). Kim Ki Whang received his 3rd dan from Toyama and had moved to the United States in the early 1960s to teach Taekwondo. Later, the Chang Moo Kwan, Han Moo Kwan, and Kang Duk Won branched off from the first Kwan. This is according to Han Moo Kwan founder Kyo Yoon Lee as written in his book Global Taekwondo 2009, and, A Modern History of Taekwondo, by Won Sik Kang and Kyong Myung Lee (1999).

== Notable practitioners ==
- Kim Ki Whang
- Dr. Yun Kwae-Byung - founder of Jidokwan.
- Yoon Byung-In - founder of Chang Moo Kwan,
- Bong Soo Han - brought Hapkido to United States and founder of International Hapkido Federation.
- Walter Todd
- Hanshi Morris Mack
- Shihan Mike Franco (Jr.)
- Grandmaster SA Brock (A student of Toshio Hanaue who brought Shudokan to the U.S.)
- Grandmaster David Brownridge (who was taught by Brock)
- Grandmaster Doug Dennis (who was taught by Brock)
- Grandmaster Peter Rose of the C&S Self-Defense Association (who was taught by Brownridge)
- Grandmaster Paul Dusenbery of Tiger Arts (who was taught by Rose)

== See also ==
- Tang Soo Do
- Kong Soo Do
- Kanbukan
