= Yun Mu Kwan =

Taekwondo schools or kwan teaching

- Founder: Kyung Suk Lee (de facto, Judo), Chun Sang Sup (introduced Karate)
- Arts taught: During Chun San Sup's time: Kong Soo Do, Gwonbeop; During Kyung Suk Lee's time: Judo
- Ancestor arts: Shotokan Karate Shudokan Karate
- Descendant arts: Taekwondo (indirectly)

- Yun Mu Kwan
- Hangul: 연무관
- Hanja: 研武館
- Lit.: Hall or Institute for Martial Study
- RR: Yeonmugwan
- MR: Yŏnmugwan

Yun Mu Kwan (Korean: 연무관) was one of the original five "kwans" that arose in Korea following World War II. It was the name of the place where a generic form of Japanese karate (Shotokan) was being taught by a number of Korean students who had studied in Japan and returned to Korea in the first half of the twentieth century, bringing the Japanese art with them. Yun Mu Kwan, as a style, would eventually be renamed Jidokwan by various former students, and would become one of the core styles that contributed to the development of what is today known as

Taekwondo.

Unlike the other kwans, the Yun Mu Kwan, as a name for a distinct style, disappeared very early in the history of Korean karate and was never formally consolidated into the new Korean national sport of taekwondo although Jidokwan, its successor style, was. There are groups today, however, that still make use of the older name.

== History ==
The Yun Mu Kwan was originally a judo school in Seoul, started by Kyung Suk Lee during the Japanese occupation of Korea.

Chun Sang Sup, a returning Korean university student who had picked up karate during his university days in Japan began teaching it at the Yun Mu Kwan. His background had been in Shotokan karate, having studied it under the direct or indirect tutelage of that system's founder, Gichin Funakoshi.

On returning to Seoul, Chun began teaching the art to judo students at the Yun Mu Kwan and eventually became the head instructor there. However, Chun taught at the Yun Mu Kwan for only a few years prior to the break out of hostilities between North and South Korea, having disappeared during that conflict, the Korean War.

After the war, many of his former students began training again, but at a new location and under different teachers who named their style Jidokwan (meaning the 'Hall or Institute for Wisdom's Way'). The Jidokwan was subsequently rolled up, along with most of the other Korean "kwans," into the newly systematized Korean national combat sport of "Taekwondo" (meaning "Foot Fist Way") circa 1959 to 1961.

=== Disappearance and survival ===
During his tenure at the Yun Mu Kwan, Chun shared teaching responsibilities with a colleague, Yoon Byung-in, who had also studied karate in Japan under another practitioner, Kanken Toyama who taught at a place called the Shudokan (although Toyama declined to characterize his methods as a distinct karate style). Yoon Byung-in moved on to found his own school of Korean karate after only a brief stint with Chun at the Chosun Yun Mu Kwan and Chun, himself, went missing during the Korean War (1950–1953) leaving the martial arts system he had founded as Yun Mu Kwan to be restarted (at war's end) under different instructors and with the new name of Ji Do Kwan (or Jidokwan), meaning the Hall (or Institute) of Wisdom's Way. Eventually Jidokwan would be absorbed, along with most of the other original Korean "kwans," into the new national art which was ultimately named "taekwondo" and which developed a standardized approach to training and methods that differed in many ways from the older transplanted Japanese-sourced karate styles it had come from. The aim of the creators of taekwondo was to unify the diverse methods and practices of the art and put their own Korean stamp on it.

There's some evidence, however, that the early Yun Mu Kwan of Chun Sang Sup produced more than one offshoot school. According to the U.S. Taekwondo Han Moo Kwan website, its founder, Kyo Yoon Lee, having originally trained under Chun at the Yun Mu Kwan, initially began teaching Korean karate under the Jidokwan banner at the end of the Korean War to fellow returning Chosun Yun Mu Kwan students, but subsequently left to found his own school which he dubbed Han Moo Kwan. In later years he maintained that his school actually traces its roots back to the former Chosun Yun Mu Kwan itself, rather than to Ji Do Kwan, making Han Moo Kwan, like Ji Do Kwan, a derivative school of the older Yun Mu Kwan.

Complicating the picture, somewhat, is the possibility that there may have been more than one early Korean karate system bearing the Yun Mu Kwan name as there appears to have been a second Korean karate "kwan", with the "Yun Moo Kwan" appellation established after the closing of the original Chosun Yun Mu Kwan, the advent of the Korean War and the older style's subsequent revival as Jidokwan. According to KANG Won Sik and LEE Kyong Myong, in "A Modern History of Taekwondo" (Published in March 1999 by Bokyung Moonhwasa at 389-22 Seokyo-dong [Mapo-ku, Seoul, Korea 121-210] and haltingly translated for Stanford University from the original Korean), there was a period between the 1950s and 1960s when efforts in Korea at unifying the different kwans (begun around 1953–1955) into a single national system were in disarray. During this period, the writers report, "more Annex Kwans (sub-kwans) came into existence, such as the Oh Do Kwan, Kang Duk Won, Jung Do Kwan, Han Moo Kwan [referenced in the preceding paragraph], Kuk Mu Kwan, Yun Moo Kwan, Soo Moo Kwan, Chang Hun Kwan, Moon Moo Kwan and others". The authors don't make clear whether this later reference to "Yun Moo Kwan" alludes to a revival of the older kwan by individuals affiliated with the original group, who were reluctant to give up the connection with the original style (like Kyo Yoon Lee), or if this represented different individuals using the old name to establish something new. However, the idea of a second or "annex" "kwan" called Yun Mu Kwan could help explain the persistence of "Yun Moo Kwan" as a karate style outside Korea long after the old Chosun Yun Mu Kwan had closed its doors and its karate practitioners had re-established themselves under different names.

== Contemporary developments ==
=== Post-Unification events ===
Some practitioners of the original kwans, including some using the "tang soo do" name (another Korean version of the original meaning of the Japanese term "karate-do"), remained outside the new system of "taekwondo" while both Jidokwan and Han Mu Kwan exist today largely within the taekwondo family rather than as active, stand-alone styles. But the Yun Mu Kwan name lingers in different places. There are still practitioners, for instance, using "Yun Moo Kwan" or "Yun Mu Kwan," particularly in parts of Latin America. For the most part, these practitioners have continued to emphasize the Korean reliance on high kicking, large movements and flashy leaps and acrobatics. One variant evolved, however, in New York City where a Korean practitioner named Min Kyu Pai began teaching the style after emigrating to the United States in the 1950s. His early efforts led to the introduction of the style to parts of Central America through one of his students, Francisco Miranda, who helped popularize karate in his native country of El Salvador.

Pai had come to the United States at the age of twenty and, according to one of his successors, James Stewart, worked as a hospital orderly for a time to earn enough to survive while attending a local college. He taught himself English as he went along, largely, as he confided to Stewart, by going to English language movies. But he found his true vocation when he began teaching the Korean fighting art he had become accomplished in back home. In the early days of his involvement in the martial arts scene he would seek new skills by apprenticing himself to more senior karate masters, Stewart has stated, like Jhoon Rhee, one of the early pioneers of taekwondo in the United States. But his desire to grow his skills did not end with taekwondo and he began to reach out to other styles and systems. His original New York school (he ran two including a second in Connecticut), called the Yun Mu Kwan Karate Institute (somewhat redundantly since "kwan" and "institute" are effectively synonymous in this context) was first documented in a contemporary article in Popular Science Magazine in the late 1960s. The school was close to New York City's Chinatown district and, as a result, Pai became deeply involved with a number of local Chinese martial artists who were then teaching their arts nearby (mostly behind closed doors in those days). Pai's methods of practice and of teaching slowly began to change through contact with these martial artists and the absorption of elements from their systems into his. Pai's activities in the 1960s and later were documented by Ramon Korff, a staff photographer, in 1964, for El Nuevo Día.

=== The Tournament circuit ===
His early students often distinguished themselves on the tournament circuit, including the free-fighting and kata competition champion, Monroe Marrow, although there was often resistance to the Chinese techniques his students frequently brought to their matches since karate tournament judges of the time were unfamiliar with (and so unwilling to credit) these moves. Pai eventually distanced himself from the tournament world and turned inward, to the development of a synthesis of Chinese methods, as he found them in New York City, with the older Yun Mu Kwan he had brought with him from Korea.

=== The Later Yun Mu Kwan ===
By the early 1970s, Min Kyu Pai's teaching methods had changed so significantly that they ceased, in many ways, to resemble the older form of Yun Mu Kwan with which he had begun. The most important influence on him at this time was Yang-style tai chi, a soft or internal Chinese martial art which was quite different from other forms of kung fu (among which it is categorized in China). By the early 1970s, Pai had become a formal student of fourth generation Yang style tai chi master Cheng Man-ch'ing. Cheng, himself, had come to New York City from Taiwan some years earlier and was a renowned senior student of Yang Chengfu, whose version of the tai chi form, dating from the earlier twentieth century, is only to be found in old photographs today. Yang Chengfu was a grandson of the founder of the Yang style of tai chi, Yang Luchan, who had developed and practiced his style of tai chi in the 19th century based on the older, secretive Chen martial art system, now known as Chen style tai chi.

Yang Luchan's style of tai chi, thanks to his reputation and skills, became the most widespread in the late 19th and early 20th centuries. By the 20th century, it had become the best-known version of tai chi practiced worldwide. In the late 20th century, due to China's opening, the older Chen style of tai chi caught up with its younger sibling and became equally well-known, if not more so, at least in the martial arts community. However, there are several other recognized styles, including Wu-Hao, Wu, and Sun styles. Min Pai, who trained in Yang style tai chi under Cheng Man-ch'ing, brought about marked changes in the methods he taught in his later years.

By 1973, Min Kyu Pai's martial art, except for its general karate format, was no longer recognizable as the older form of Yun Mu Kwan with its emphasis on Korean-style high kicking and the hard, direct and aggressive methods of classic Japanese Shotokan. Instead Pai introduced principles of movement based on tai chi (including yielding to give way and redirect an opponent's force, sensitivity to feel and facilitate the yielding techniques before incoming force, and "circular bodily movement," around an imaginary central axis, to manage and redirect incoming attacks). In 1992, Pai essentially retired from teaching and relocated to a Zen monastery which he had arranged to have built with the advice and support of then head Abbot of the Zen Studies Society Eido Shimano Roshi. He turned his New York City school over to two of his senior black belts, James Stewart and Carolyn Campora. Campora continues teaching today. In 1995, Pai began devoting himself exclusively to monastery affairs, teaching only a small cadre of students until his death in 2004.

Despite the significant differences in the methods he had developed from those he had brought with him from his native Korea, Pai retained the Yun Mu Kwan name for most of his career, until some time after 1987 when he re-dubbed his style "Nabi Su" (meaning "butterfly hand" or "way"), a name he took from a form (a fixed practice routine, called "kata" by the Japanese and "hyung" or "poomse" in Korean) which he had developed in his later years to capture and crystallize the changes in combat methods he had embraced. A number of his former students, however, continue to practice the style he developed and once taught as Yun Mu Kwan under that older name.

== See also ==
- Original masters of taekwondo
- Kwan (martial arts)
- Korean martial arts
