= Kanken Tōyama =

Okinawan karateka

- Born: September 24, 1888; Gibo Village, Shuri, Okinawa
- Died: November 24, 1966 (aged 78); Shuri, Okinawa,
- Style: Shūdōkan Karate (founder); Okinawan martial arts (Shuri-te), various forms of Chinese martial arts including Taijiquan
- Teacher: Itosu Anko

Kanken Tōyama (遠山寛賢 Tōyama Kanken, 24 September 1888 – 24 November 1966) was a Japanese schoolteacher and karate master, who developed the foundation for the Shūdōkan karate style.

== Background ==
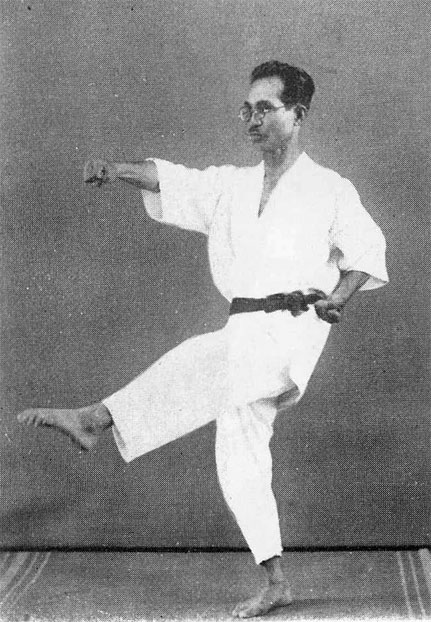
Kanken Toyama in Karate Gi circa 1934.

Kanken Toyama, was born Oyadomari Kanken in Shuri, Okinawa, Japan, in 1888 (Meiji 21).

He trained under: Itosu Anko and Itarashiki primarily, and under Ankichi Aragaki, Azato Anko, Chosho Chibana, Oshiro, Tana, Yabu Kentsu and Kanryo Higashionna.

At 9 years old (c. 1897), he began his karate (Shuri-te) training under Ankō Itosu, and remained a student there until Itosu died in 1915. He also studied Naha-te under Kanryō Higaonna and Tomari-te under Ankichi Aragaki.

In 1924 Toyama moved his family to Taiwan, where he taught in an elementary school and studied Chinese Ch'uan Fa, which included Taku, Makaitan, Rutaobai, and Ubo. Given this diverse martial arts background, the Japanese government soon recognized Toyama's prowess, and awarded him the right to promote to any rank in any style of Okinawan karate. An official gave Toyama the title of master instructor.

In 1927, he was attacked by a swordsman belonging to a koryu school, who may have had mistaken Toyama to another Karate practitioner he had grudge with. Toyama managed to subdue the swordsman after evading his swing, catching the swordsman's arm, and ramming the swordsman onto an earthen wall and fell unconscious.

In early 1930 he returned to Japan and on March 20, 1930, he opened his first dojo in Tokyo. He named his dojo Shu Do Kan meaning "the hall for the study of the karate way." Toyama taught what he had learnt from Itosu and the Ch'uan Fa and did not claim to have originated a new style of karate. Toyama had numerous Korean born people studying Karate, including Yoon Byung-in, Yun Kwae-byung, and Kim Ki-whang.

After World War II ended, Toyama donated hundreds of books to Okinawa Prefecture because his hometown of Okinawa was severely damaged by the war and there was a shortage of books for school children to read. Due to this achievement, the title of "Karate Dodai Shihan" was sent by Takanobu Shikiya, the first governor of Okinawa. Also, following the war, martial arts were banned by GHQ. To get around the ban and continue Karate, a handful of Toyama's highest ranking students formed a dojo named Kanbukan (Hall of Korean Martial Arts) and appointed Yun Kwae-byung (who had a special status as third country person) as its director to avoid being shut-down by GHQ.

On December 10, 1947, Toyama was assaulted by an intoxicated American soldier without warning. Toyama did not resist the attack and allowed the soldier to beat him. Eventually, the American soldier tired of beating him and ran away. Toyama was not seriously injured by the incident.

Around 1948, Toyama had a dispute with Gichin Funakoshi over the "head family of karate". Toyama, who admits to being a direct disciple of Itosu, argued that Funakoshi was only a sideline under the Itosu gate (Funakoshi was a direct disciple of Anko Asato), and that those who were not directly connected to Itosu were not legitimate Okinawa Karate. Another issue in this controversy was that Toyama was a graduate of the Okinawa Normal School, while Funakoshi was from the Hayashi course (one-year course) of the Okinawa Prefecture Normal School. Toyama argued that only those who learned from Itosu in the main course of the Normal School were the successors to Itosu.

However, Itosu began teaching at the Normal School in 1905, and even though Funakoshi was enrolled in the main course, he was born in 1868. Funakoshi could not have had the opportunity to study under Itosu. In any case, through the Toyama-Funakoshi controversy, it seems certain that there was a sense of discrimination between direct and collateral among the disciples of Itosu.

Toyama held demonstration at the National Karatedo Championships (currently the National Karatedo Championships with Armor) started by his disciples.

When the former All Japan Karatedo Federation (currently the All Japan Karatedo Federation Renbukai) was established in 1951, Shudokan became the general headquarters, and Toyama contributed to the spread of karate as a sport of Armored Karate as a master. Around this time, Tsuru Shobo published books such as "Mysterious Secret Karatedo," "Protective Training Karatedo," and "Karadodo Daihokan."

Toyama believed that "there is no school in karate" and he has maintained a non-school principle throughout his life. Kanken Toyama died on November 24, 1966, in Shuri, Okinawa.

== Non-school principle ==
Toyama, who admits to being a direct line of Anko Itosu, has maintained a non-school principle throughout his life, did not give the school name to his karate, and denied the existence of the school itself. The theory is that "there is no reason why the most solemn feat should have two or three different styles of feats." Toyama said, "It is the usual way of karate to practice in various ways, and it is fundamentally different from the school," said all of the things that were named the school at that time. I thought that it should not be established as a school, considering it as a difference in the training of.

In his book "Karate Dodaihokan," Toyama talked about Shorin-ryu and Shorei-ryu, which were already well known at the time, by writing: "It is being told to the world as if this second class now exists, but there is no solid basis or evidence on historical facts." He insisted that they were integrated in the same format.

In addition, regarding the various schools that were born in the early Showa period, Toyama himself asked questions when he met Kenwa Mabuni of the Shito-ryu and Chojun Miyagi of the Goju-ryu, and Mabuni said, "Isn't it more meaningful to give it a name, and it's also meaningful to think of your teacher?" Miyagi said, "Because people in the world are not aware of karate, the whole picture is expressed in two letters, Go and Juu. "In the end, the name of the karate is meaningless because it is a genuine Okinawan karate with no style or school."

In addition, regarding the fact that new schools were frequently born at that time, "Recently, there are some unknown karateka who have introduced a strange new name. These are people who do not know the whole picture of orthodox karate."

== Teaching ==
=== Definition of Karate ===
Toyama describes karate as "a martial art that protects itself with a hand-held karate based on the principles of stiffness, yin and yang, and breathing, and is free to attack and defend against enemies, with ethical lessons as the first priority."

=== Moral lessons ===
In the three books left by Hiroken, the following six articles are described as moral lessons.

1. 守礼のくに (Shurei no kuni)
2. 空手に先手なし (Karate ni sente nashi - meaning "No first move in Karate")
3. 忍は百行の基なり (Shinobu wa hyaku gyō no kinari)
4. 手が出たら意地を引け、意地が出たら手を引け (Te ga detara iji o hike, iji ga detara te o hike)
5. 柔即和、剛即和 (softness and rigidy)
6. 喧嘩争いは買っても捨てよ (Kenka arasoi wa katte mo suteyo - meaning "Even if you buy a quarrel, throw it away")

=== Knowledge of those who do Karate ===
1. The meaning of (Wu 武) is to stop the fight by entering the two people who are in a relationship. You should think carefully about the essence of this meaning and move on to the actual battle.
2. There is no first move in karate. Karate is a teaching that shows a spiritual attitude that it does not move by its own weight, and that even small enemies should not be despised, warlike, and actively take the initiative. The lack of initiative in the form of karate is the breadth of peaceful and ethical meaning, and it is a great lesson of ancient and modern times.
3. If a person does it once, he will do it 100 times, and if he does it 100 times, he will do it 1000 times. In short, effort training and ingenuity are the secrets to improving karate.
4. Those who enter by reason have a longer day than those who enter by skill. The lesson is that you should first know the reason, learn the technique, and then train your limbs.
5. Karate has the last and only offensive and defensive and self-defense skills that are beyond the reach of the Cautious, the humble and the benevolent.
6. According to Sun Tzu, "Old good warrior, unwinnable first, winnable enemy". In other words, it means to occupy the undefeated ground of oneself first, and then take on the defeat of the enemy.
7. Be bold and do it meticulously. The dignitary is like the ocean, and the dignitaries are like a stream without sound, and it is necessary to be prepared not to be afraid of the big enemy and not to despise the small enemy.
8. Protect yourself. If you wanted to attack the opponent, you would have a chance to take advantage of the enemy. If you protect yourself, the gaps of the other party will appear naturally.
9. Quan has big eight sentences "Human hearts are in the same heaven and earth, blood is like the sun and moon, the law is rigid and soft, vomiting, and the body is ready to respond at any time. When the hand is in the air, the code advances and retreats. The eyes need to be four directions.

=== Unknown techniques ===
Toyama had the following seven mysterious techniques as the inherited from Anko Itosu.

- Fukushiki kokyūhō (複式呼吸法 - eng. dual (double) system breathing method)
- Shishi no hō (獅子の法 - eng. lion method)
- Tora no hō (虎の法 - eng. tiger method)
- Akuryokuhō (握力法 - eng. grip strength method)
- Tanganhō (鍛眼法 - eng. eyes training method)
- Kuma no te (熊の手 - eng. bear's paw)
- Sankakutobi (三角飛び - eng. triangular jump)

== Students ==
The individuals listed below are Shudokan pupils of Toyama as listed in Karate-Do Tai Hokan. The translated partial list includes the karate-do shihan and hanshi title license and high degree rank (fifth dan to eighth dan). The '*' symbol indicates persons and organizations that did not train directly with Toyama, but were confirmed as members with the responsibilities of the shihan title and high degree rank.

Name	Title	Position / Location	
Iji Choshin	Shihan	Okinawa Shuri City To Sho Kan	
Iwasa Kahoya	Hanshi Shihan	Hokaido Superior Branch Coal Mine, Branch Mining Director	
Ito Mikihiro	Hanshi Shihan	Tokyo Distinguished College Teacher, Mori Dojo Director	
In Hei Jin (Yoon Byung-in)	Shihan	Seoul, Korea Dojo (YMCA Kwon Bop Bu; renamed as Chang Moo Kwan)	
In Gi Hei (Yun Kwae-byung)	Shihan	Tokyo Kanbukan (Korean Martial Hall Director); later Jidokwan in Korea	
Inoue Kiyoshi	Shihan	Tokyo Metropolitan Ota District	
Izumikawa Hiroki	Hanshi Shihan	Kawasaki City, Senbukan Director	*
Hanaue Toshio	Hanshin Shihan	Kanagawa Prefecture, Atsugi City, Kodokan Director	
Toshishinga Fumio	Shihan	Hokaido, Toshishinga Dojo Director	
Chitose Tadashi	Hanshin Shihan	Chiba Prefecture, Choshi City Nen Dojo Cho	
Onishi Eizo	Shihan	Ehime Prefecture, Iyo City, Koei-Kan Karate-Do Founder/Director	
Onishi Kazuhiro	Shihan	Ehime Prefecture, Kawanoishi	
Ogawa Hideharu	Shihan	Tokyo Metropolitan, Shinjuku District	
Watanabe Kenichi	Hanshin Shihan	Tokyo Metropolitan, Ota District, Seidokan Director	
Katsumura Masao	Hanshin Shihan	Yokohama City, Seidokan Director	*
Yoshikawa Hideo	Hanshin Shihan	Tokyo Metropolitan, Nerima District, Seifukan Director	
Yoshida Tetsuo	Shihan	Ibaragi Prefecture, Tatsugazaki City, Taiikukyokai Karate Club Director	
Tamaki Hakufu	Hanshin Shihan	Oita Prefecture, Beppu City, Tachinaka Section Junior High School Principal	
Takamine Michio	Shihan	Kyushu	
Mou Hozo	Shihan	Kyushu	
Tsuchiya Hideo	Shihan	Kanagawa Prefecture, Odawara City	
Narazaki Takeo	Hanshin Shihan	Tokyo Metropolitan, Setagaya Kempokan Director	
Nakagomi Ichiro	Shihan	Yamanashi Prefecture, Yu Dan Sha (Grade/Ranking) Chairman	
Korishima Ichiro	Hanshin Shihan	Tokyo, Retired Army Lieutenant General	
Kurita Yoshifumi	Shihan	Ehime Prefecture	
Yabiku Isamu	Shihan	Tokyo Metropolitan, Muronouchi	
Fujiwara Fumiyoshi	Shihan	Fukuoka City, Tenjin Cho, Seiki Dojo Director	
Kinoshita Yoshifumi	Shihan	Saitama Prefecture, Kitaadachi County	
Koizumi Shonosuke	Shihan	Tokyo Metropolitan, Meguro District	
Koyasu Michio	Shihan	Kyushu	
Amamiya Hiroshi	Shihan	Yamnashi Prefecture, Shioyama City	
Akamine Shozuke	Shosuke Shihan	Kawasaki City, Nakajima	*
Arai Toshiro	Shihan	Tokyo Metropolitan, Toshima District, Chihaya Preparatory School Director	
Arakaki Ryusho	Shihan	Tokyo Metropolitan, Yoyogi Shudokan Branch Dojo Director	
Sakura Toshio	Shihan	Tokyo Metropolitan, Daito District	
Kinjo Hiroshi	Hanshi Shihan	Tokyo Renbukan Shihan	*
Shimabukuro Kosuke	Shihan	Yokohama City, Tsurumi District, Shimabukuro Dojo Director	
Shibanaka Iwao	Shihan	Ehime Prefecture	
Shimono Keiji	Shihan	Self Defense Force General Affairs Director	
Higa Yoshito	Hanshi Shihan	Okinawa, Public Prosecutor General	
Higa Yoshiaki	Shihan	Yokohama City, Tsurumi District	
Higashiona Hiroshi	Hanshi Shihan	Kanagawa Prefecture, Omichikan Headquarters Director	*
Higa Seitoku	Shihan	Ryukyu Public Prosecutors Office, Prosecuting Attorney	

Other students awarded shihan and hanshi title license and high degree rank but not referenced in Karate-Do Tai Hokan.

Name	Title	Position / Location
Isao Ichikawa	Hanshin Shihan	Founder Karatedo Doshinkan
Morita Sadao	Shihan	Yokohama City
Suzuki Hideaki	Shihan	Tokyo Metropolitan, Ota District
Suzuki Yoshitsugu	Shihan	Shizuoka Prefecture, Seishukan Director
Sunabe Koichi	Shihan	Yokohama City, Tsurumi District, Sunabe Dojo Director
Akitani Seiji	Shihan	Shudokan Chairman
Murata Yoshitaro	Shihan	Hokaido
Takazawa Masanao (deceased)	Shihan	Okaya City, Nagano Prefecture (Founder of Keishinkan)

== Writing ==
- "Karate / Okute Secret" Tsuru Shobo
- "Karate Daihokan" Tsuru Shobo
- "Introduction to Karatedo" Tsuru Shobo

== See also ==
- List of karateka
