= Patrick McCarthy (martial artist) =

Canadian martial artist and historian

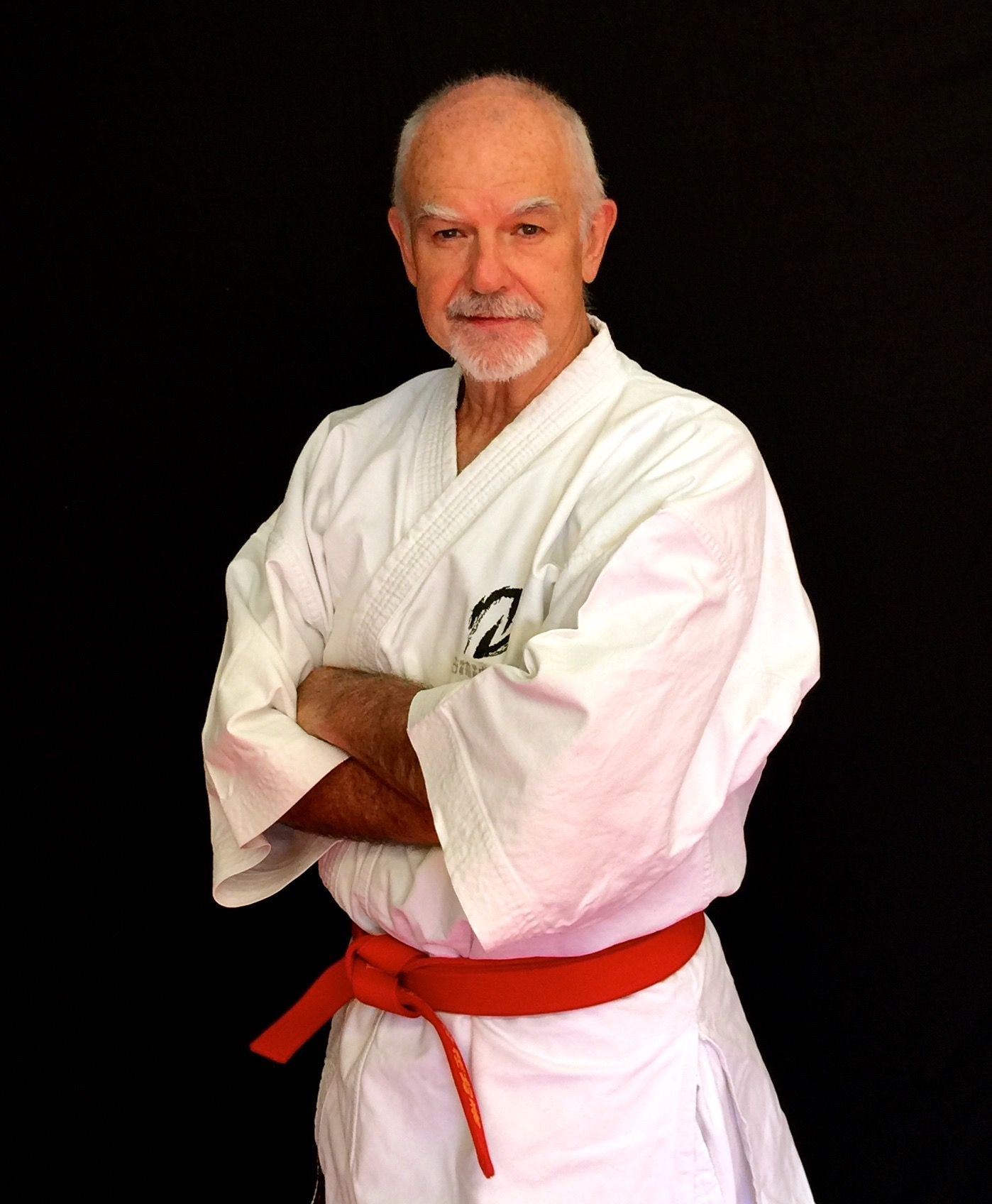
- McCarthy in 2015
- Born: December 4, 1954; Saint John, New Brunswick, Canada
- Style: Koryū Uchinādi, Ōshiro-ha Yamane-ryū Okinawan Kobudō, Aiki Kenpō Jūjutsu, Sugino-ha Tenshin Shōden Katori Shintō-ryū, Lam Sai Wing Hung Gar Kung Fu, Arnis, Silat, Shootfighting & Catch Wrestling, Musō Shinden-ryū
- Teachers: Adrian Gomes, Tsuruoka Masami, Willem Reeders, Chong Oi Mun, Daniel Pai, Wally Slocki, Ron Forrester, Wally Jay, Remy Presas, Richard Kim, Kinjo Hiroshi, Inoue Motokatsu, Sugino Yoshio
- Rank: Hanshi, 10th Dan

Other information
- Notable students: Bill Johansen, Bert Mullen, Paschal Wafula, Olaf Krey, Darrin Johnson, Mike Coombes, Marco Forti, Jim Sindt, Paul Lopresti, Cody Stewart, Steve McLellan, Helen Sakamoto, Avi Nardia, Borut Kincl, Dr. Ludovic De Cuypere, Joe Glavin, Ante Branbacka, Tuari Dawson, Reece Cummings, Danny Spletter, Erin Gamble, Johnny Kennedy, Verlin Koch, Hendrik Felber, Peter Wetherspoon, Dinah Kretschmer, David Fernandez Parra, Andrzej Kazmierczak, Phyllis Chalmers, Bob King, Paul Massey-Reed, Martin Hurley, Alan Borthwick, Shawn Donaldson, Wolfgang Vogel, Erik Angerhofer, Jari Tuominen, Juha Tuominen

Patrick McCarthy (born December 4, 1954) is a Canadian martial arts practitioner, competitor, instructor, historian, researcher and author. He is the founder and director of the International Ryukyu Karate Research Society (IRKRS; 琉球唐手術国際研究會) and the founder of Koryū Uchinādi (古流沖縄手), overseeing an international group with about 20,000 members. His work has included extensive travel throughout Japan, Okinawa and other parts of Asia, the collection and study of historical source material, interviews with prominent martial arts teachers and the families of deceased masters, and the translation and publication of historical martial arts texts. He is particularly known for his research into the Bubishi, referred to as the “Bible of karate-do” by Miyagi Chōjun, and publishing the first English-language translation and commentary. Subsequently, Fighting Arts International called McCarthy “the foremost Western historian of karate-do.” Over several decades, he has taught martial arts internationally, conducting seminars on six continents.

== Early life and career ==
McCarthy was born in 1954 in Saint John, New Brunswick, where he was raised until his family relocated to Toronto, Ontario in 1970. Growing up in Rockwood Court in Saint John, McCarthy participated in several sports and received his first exposure to organized fighting through boxing at the Allison Grounds community centre, where he trained under Ralph “Tiger” Thomas. Although McCarthy does not characterize himself as having been an accomplished competitive boxer, the experience introduced him to combative training. McCarthy's more direct interest in martial arts began during the mid-1960s after seeing the National Film Board of Canada documentary Judoka, which chronicled fellow Canadian Doug Rogers' win in the 1964 Summer Olympics. McCarthy subsequently sought out judo instruction at the local YMCA in Saint John, New Brunswick. He instead encountered Kyokushin karate, and started training under Adrian Gomes at 10 years old. While visiting Montreal during Expo 67 to compete with the South End Little League All-Star baseball team at the Canadian level, the twelve-year-old McCarthy attended the Japanese pavilion, where he recalls seeing separate karate demonstrations involving Chitose Tsuyoshi and Hisataka Masayuki. After moving to Toronto, he briefly studied Chitō-ryū karate under Mas Tsuroka, widely recognized as an important pioneer of karate in Canada. He went on to study various disciplines, including Karate, Jujutsu, Kung Fu, Okinawan Kobudō, Kickboxing, and Musō Shinden-ryū with various teachers.

The early 1970s coincided with an extraordinary growth of public interest in Asian martial arts. The emergence of Bruce Lee had a profound influence on McCarthy and countless other young martial artists of his generation. McCarthy became increasingly involved with Chinese and Southeast Asian fighting traditions, including Hung Gar and Indonesian Silat, while maintaining his interest in karate and becoming increasingly attracted to martial arts competition. It was around this time that he first started competing, in kata, weapons and Kumite on the tournament circuit throughout Canada and the United States. Competitors and instructors representing numerous traditions gathered at the same events, creating opportunities for exchange that rarely existed within individual schools. McCarthy consequently explored and cross-trained in systems including Wing Chun, Choy Li Fut, Dō Pai, Eagle Claw and several styles of karate, while encountering practitioners from Japanese, Okinawan, Chinese, Korean, Southeast Asian and Western fighting traditions. In 1973, he was promoted to second-degree black belt through the Canadian Karate Kung Fu Association (CKKA), under the authority of Chong Oi Mun (a.k.a., David Chong). Chong's martial arts background combined his family's connection with Lam Sai Wing Hung Gar in Hong Kong with Chitō-ryū karate, resulting in a hybrid approach incorporating both Chinese and Japanese/Okinawan influences. For McCarthy, this environment was particularly attractive because it allowed him to remain actively involved in both the karate and Chinese martial arts communities. During this time, he cross-trained with instructors like Dave Huston, Ron Forrester, Wally Jay, Bob Dalglish, and Wally Slocki, contributing to the cross-pollination of martial arts styles in Canada. In 1974, McCarthy became chief instructor of the Yao Loong Kung Fu Centre in Toronto. Working alongside Chinese business partners gave him access to a network of practitioners representing southern Chinese martial arts, introduced him to the Short Form of Yang-style Taiji (and meeting Cheng Man Ching at his school in New York), and exposed him more deeply to the cultural environment surrounding those traditions. At that time, he also increasingly committed himself to the open tournament circuit. McCarthy won the North American Karate Championships in both 1974 and 1978. In 1975, he joined the Vic Tanny fitness organization and developed professionally within the health and fitness industry while continuing to train, teach, cross-train and compete. In 1979, McCarthy relocated to British Columbia and opened the Vancouver Karate Centre.

== Research and teaching of traditional martial arts ==
While in a Toronto Chinatown bookshop, McCarthy found his first copy of the Bubishi, which helped pique his interest in learning a more traditional approach to martial arts. McCarthy’s friend and Kumite coach, Wally Slocki, suggested he attended a seminar being given by Richard Kim. In October 1977, McCarthy attended Kim’s seminar, which was hosted by Don Warrener in the city of Hamilton, Ontario. McCarthy was so impressed by Kim, that he applied and was accepted into the Zen Bei Butoku Kai, where he began learning Shorinji-ryū Karate-dō, Ryūkyū Kobudō and Yang-style Taiji. From him, McCarthy gained a deeper understanding of the history and philosophy of traditional martial arts.

In 1984 Karate Illustrated featured McCarthy on the cover.

Seeking further development of his knowledge and skills, McCarthy first travelled to Japan in 1985. The following year, he met Miyahara Yuriko, a Japanese national originally from Nagano Prefecture. They subsequently married in Nagano and established their home in Fujisawa, Kanagawa Prefecture, approximately an hour south of Tokyo. In Japan, he was accepted as a student of Kinjo Hiroshi, one of Kim’s teachers from the post-war era. With Kinjo, he continued his studies of the history and techniques of Japanese and Okinawan martial arts, including old-school karate-jutsu, sai and bo. He came to regard Kim and Kinjo as his primary sensei’s.

McCarthy founded the IRKRS in the late 1980's. Over subsequent decades, the IRKRS developed into an international network of practitioners, instructors and affiliated dōjōs. McCarthy's international teaching career and research have remained closely connected with the organization. For approximately three decades, he has travelled extensively conducting seminars and educational programs. In addition to writing several books on Okinawan martial arts, McCarthy published the first English translation of the Bubishi, a collection of handwritten essays and drawings about Yongchun Crane & Monk Fist boxing and related subjects that were passed down from teacher to student dating back to the early 19th century.

McCarthy established the Koryukan dojo in 1989 and became one of the few non-Asians to teach martial arts in Japan. McCarthy would spend approximately a decade in Japan during this period before subsequently living for more than twenty years in Australia, followed by approximately a year and a half in Los Angeles. He later returned to Japan and established his present home in Okinawa. McCarthy teaches Koryū Uchinādi, highly functional kata application practices, Aiki Kenpo Jujutsu, and Ōshiro-ha Yamane-ryū Kobudō using a pedagogy-based method of learning. He is also well known for his historical lectures.

McCarthy's work in karate history has appeared in academic scholarship on the martial arts. He is described an expert in the anthropology of martial arts in a 2021 study of formality and spontaneity in the fighting arts. That same study also refers to McCarthy as a proponent of the HAPV: Habitual Acts and Physical Violence Theory.

== Honors and legacy ==
In 1994, at Kinjo's recommendation, McCarthy became the first Westerner to receive the Kyoshi 7th Dan (rank) Teaching License from the Dai Nippon Butoku Kai in Kyoto. He went on to be awarded the Hanshi Teaching License from the World Kobudo Federation (2004), Shihan license 8th and 9th Dan from Kinjo (2005, 2011), induction into the Canadian Black Belt Hall of Fame (2012), 10th Dan from the American Teachers Association of the Martial Arts and the World Okinawan Shorin-Ryu Karate & Kobudo Association (2023), Hanshi 10th Dan from the Kenshikai (2023), and Hanshi 10th Dan from the Ryukyu Dento Kobujutsu Hozon Budo Kyokai in Okinawa (2026).

When inducting McCarthy in 2012, the Canadian Black Belt Hall of Fame stated, “McCarthy's groundbreaking efforts helped launch the kata-bunkai trend during the 1980s, making him one of the most sought after instructors around the world.” His eclectic training and knowledge, and unique style of teaching resulted in dozens of articles by and features of him in numerous martial arts magazines. His Koryu Uchinadi philosophy and methods have been taught in seminars around the world, and have been adopted by dojos and are now practiced by thousands of martial artists in Australia, Japan, North America, Europe, Africa and Brazil.

The Canadian Black Belt Hall of Fame also named McCarthy as recipient of the Masami Tsuruoka Life Time Achievement Award in 2026.

== Publications ==
1. Classical Kata of Okinawan Karate. (1987). Black Belt Communications. ISBN 978-0-89750-113-2.
2. Bubishi: The Bible of Karate. (1995). Tuttle. ISBN 0804820155, 978-0804820158.
3. Ancient Okinawan Martial Arts: Koryū Uchinādi, Volume 1. (1999). Tuttle. ISBN 978-0-8048-2093-6.
4. Legend of the Fist. (2018). ISBN 978-1-9850-0676-8.
5. Tales of Okinawa's Great Masters. (2000). By Nagamine Shōshin; translated by Patrick McCarthy. Tuttle. ISBN 978-0-8048-2089-9.
6. Bubishi: La Bibbia del Karate. (2000). Italian translation by Pasquale Faccia. Edizioni Mediterranee. ISBN 978-88-272-1350-6.
7. Bubishi: La Biblia del Karate. (2001). Spanish translation by Joaquín Tolsá Torrenova. Ediciones Tutor. ISBN 978-84-7902-307-2.
8. Bubishi: Bible Karate. (2005). Czech and Slovak translation by Igor Vakoš and R. F. Hrabal. CAD Press. ISBN 80-88969-26-3.
9. Bubishi. (2009). Greek translation by Grigoris Miliaresis. Alcimachon. ISBN 978-960-6623-56-1.
10. Ancient Okinawan Martial Arts Vol. 1. (2001). Russian Translation by A. Kurchakova (А. Курчакова). Феникс (Phoenix), Rostov-on-Don, Russia. ISBN 5-222-01612-9.
11. Ancient Okinawan Martial Arts: Koryū Uchinādi, Volume 2. (2002). Tuttle. ISBN 978-0-8048-3147-5.
12. Legend of the Fist. (2018). ISBN 978-1-9850-0676-8.
13. Bubishi. (2022). Italian translation by Marzio Petrolo. Newton Compton Editori. ISBN 978-88-227-6608-3.
14. Kensei, Kyan Chōtoku: The Man and his Art. (2023). ISBN 978-1-9804-4331-5.
15. Funakoshi Gichin, Tanpenshu: A Collection of Short Stories. (2024). ISBN 978-1-7231-8630-1.
16. Motobu Chōki, Karate: My Art. (2024). ISBN 979-8-3041-1776-0.
17. Ryūkyū Kobudō Modern Pioneer: Taira Shinken. (2025). ISBN 979-8-2771-6658-1.
