= Ryuchi Matsuda =

Japanese scholar of Chinese martial arts

- Ryuchi Matsuda (松田 隆智, Matsuda Ryūchi)
- Born: Masashi Matsuda; June 6, 1938
- Died: July 24, 2013 (aged 75)
- Occupations: Writer, Martial Artist (Chinese martial arts), Shingon priest
- Writing career
- Language: Japanese, Chinese
- Genres: Martial arts manuals, Martial arts history,
- Notable work: A Historical Outline of Chinese Martial Arts
- Martial arts career
- Style: Chinese martial arts: Bajiquan, Chen-style taijiquan, Northern Mantis Boxing, Bagua Palm, and Yen Ching Boxing; Japanese martial arts: Goju-Ryu Karate, Shinkage-ryū, Jigen-ryu, Daito-ryu Aikijujutsu, Hakkō-ryū Jūjutsu, Asayama Ichiden-ryū
- Teachers: Su Yu-chang, Ma Xianda, others

Ryuchi Matsuda (松田 隆智, Matsuda Ryūchi; June 6, 1938 – July 24, 2013) - born Masashi Matsuda (松田 鉦, Matsuda Masashi) - was a Japanese scholar of Chinese martial arts from Okazaki City, Aichi Prefecture. "Ryuchi" was his Dharma name when he was a Shingon priest of Toji Temple.

Per Dr. Kenji Tokitsu, author and practitioner of Japanese martial arts, Matsuda is known for introducing and publicising various Chinese martial arts in Japan. His research and writing covered both Buddhism and martial arts.

He was the author behind A Historical Outline of Chinese Martial Arts and a manga called Kenji (supposedly based on his life story).

== Overview ==
Born Masashi Matsuda, he was a admirer of martial arts, particiulary Su Yu-chang, a well-known martial artist in Taiwan's martial arts (Central Guoshu Institute). In his youth, he studied various Japanese martial arts.

Later, he would travel to Taiwan and become Su Yu-chang's apprentice. Later circa 1985, he became an apprentice of Ma Xianda in mainland China.

At some point he became a Shingon Buddhist monk and received his Dharma name, Ryuchi.

He wrote his autobiography “Nazo no kenpō o motomete” (『謎の拳法を求めて』Eng. "In Search of Mysterious Kenpo") based on his own martial arts history, which later became a big hit and served basis for the martial arts manga Kenji in 1989.

His work has unearthed obscure martial arts concepts, such as Aiki and Fa jin, to the Japanese public. His writing also conveys the essence of these martial arts.

Matsuda was the chief editor of the martial arts magazine "Gekkan Hiden" (eng.『月刊秘伝』 "Monthly Secret").

Ryuchi Matsuda died of acute myocardial infarction at 7:39 on July 24, 2013. He was 75 year old at his death.

== Martial Arts background ==
Matsuda first enrolled in Goju-ryu (Goju-ryu Kenbukan in Wakayama) and Oyama Dojo, the predecessor of Kyokushin Kaikan (awarded 3rd dan on April 15, 1967). After accumulating martial arts itineraries such as Jigen-ryū swordsmanship, Shinkage-ryu swordsmanship, Daito-ryu Aikijujutsu, Hakkō-ryū Jūjutsu (Minden master), Asayama Ichidenryu Sakai school, Kinbei Sato (ja), and possibly others. He later went to train across Taiwan and mainland China, where he learned some Chinese martial arts such as Chen-style tai chi, Baji Boxing, Northern Mantis Boxing, Baguazhang, and Yen Ching Boxing.

== Martial Arts authority ==
In Japan, when it was common to recognize Shorinji Kempo as a martial art or tai chi as a health method when it came to Chinese physical skills, Matsuda, through his books, introduced Chinese martial arts such as Chen-style tai chi, Mantis Fist, and bajiquan to public consciousness.

At that time, it was generally recognized that "Taijiquan [tai chi] is a health method born from martial arts", but according to Matsuda's book, Chen-style tai chi, the root of all modern forms of tai chi, was not a health method and became one as it spread to places like Taiwan.

At the time, there was almost no information on martial arts from mainland China and it was Matsuda's knowledge he acquired in his travels was considered the primary source in the matter.

In introducing Chinese martial arts, Matsuda pointed out that in China, the qualities and training are recognized by the teacher, and the selected person can learn the essence for the first time, which was a difference from the modern martial arts of Japan. Furthermore, differences between Japanese karate's and Chinese martial arts' power generation became topic of discussion for first time in Japan.

Despite introducing various Chinese Martial arts to Japanese public, Matsuda himself had little interest in starting any kind of full-scale teaching of kung to the public. Matsuda cited that he was not interested in idea of money-making or spreading an organizational entity, saying that he was more focused on his personal improvement via martial arts. In addition, Matsuda warned from the history of ancient martial arts between Japan and China that modern Japanese martial arts would gradually lose their essence due to competitions and that martial arts should not be exercised for "so-called strength" alone.

Kinbei Sato, Kyoji Kasao and others announced their works one after another, as if they were competing at the same time with Matsuda's series of works, and the word "Chinese martial arts" became established in Japan. Influenced by these books, Taiwan and those who learned in mainland China after the restoration of diplomatic relations between Japan and China became more popular. In this respect, Matsuda can be said to be a pioneer.

To Matsuda, there were two types of martial arts: modern martial arts, which are competitive, and ancient martial arts, which were not competitive. The latter has the claim that "martial arts is a dangerous technique and cannot be played as a competition", and Matsuda's position is the same as that of the old school.

Matsuda wrote in his early book, "In Search of Mysterious Fist," because there are few records of actual battles with bare hands in Japanese karate. As a person who could literally embody the word "one-shot deadly" that had become famous and innocent, he honestly wrote the impression that he learned about bajiquan's Li Shuwen and xingyiquan's Guo Yunshen.

The term "actual battle" here does not mean a full contact match with a referee and rules, but a duel with no referees or rules. However, people who did not read Matsuda's early writings and later learned Chinese martial arts from continental masters, knowing only "Matsuda as the original manga author", "Matsuda intended by the manga" Kenji". It was sometimes regarded as "the strongest myth of Li Shuwen". However, it should be evaluated as "a person who has raised the honor of not only the same gate but also Chinese martial arts and introduced it to the general public" by discovering "a master of the same gate, a hero".

The historical masters such as Ma Fengtu, Han Kaomi, and Zhang Yu Wei, who were introduced as disciples of Li Shuwen in Matsuda's book "Illustrated Chinese Martial Arts History," were not disciples of Li Shuwen.

Also, in the same book, it is said that the orthodox bajiquan is in Li Shuwen, and in later years, Mr. Wu, a sect of bajiquan with whom Matsuda has an active exchange, is not described at all. This is because the first edition of "Illustrated Chinese Martial Arts History" was in 1976, before Matsuda had a full-scale exchange with martial arts artists on the continent (although it was not corrected in the 1998 edition, this is a reprint of a novel etc. Also probably because of the practice of not modifying the original text).

Since "Illustrated Chinese Martial Arts History" arrived to library in Beijing, Ma Xianda's started contact with Matsuda and the start of these exchanges were significant. In a way, it can be said that Ryuchi Matsuda is a hidden player in cultural exchange between Japan and China.

It is said that Matsuda helped a Chinese martial artist to join and perform at the Japan-China Friendship Martial Arts Demonstration Exchange Tournament held as the 8th Japan Kobudo Demonstration Tournament in 1985.

== Relationship with Japanese Budo ==
While Matsuda is strongly associated Chinese martial arts, he is also scholar in Japanese Kobudo.

Originally, judo, kendo, and karate were easily accessible at school clubs, local dojos, police stations, etc., but Kobudo was often neglected for not having any personal and regional ties. Matsuda actively sought out "obscure Japanese jujutsu" "mysterious kenpo", as evidenced by his background in Shinkage-ryu swordsmanship, Jigen-ryu swordsmanship, Daito-ryu Aikijujutsu, and visiting other old-fashioned dojos in various parts of Japan.

The achievement of making the existence of Japanese ancient martial arts more known is great, and he thought that "Japan has excellent martial arts that have achieved its own development." It can be said that it gave courage to those who had doubts about the martial arts that were becoming competitive and tried to "return the origin of Japanese martial arts".

In addition, he too part in undertakings to preserve the old schools by introducing Eiji Sakai of Asayama Ichiden-ryū.

== Media appearances ==
- Appeared in the video of the song "Kung Fu Lady" on the children's TV program "Hirake! Ponkikki". Released the very valuable taolu to the public for the first time in Japan.
- In the movie "Keiji Monogatari" series (1982-1987) starring Tetsuya Takeda. Detective Katayama, played by Takeda, uses the Northern Praying Mantis based on Matsuda's guidance.
- In 1987, he cooperated with the research of Yasuro Yoshifuku, an assistant professor (at the time) at Chubu University, who is known for his research on martial arts forms. Yoshifuku researched Matsuda's fajin and elucidated a part of the mechanical characteristics of fajin.
- After cooperating with the manga "Otokogumi", Matsuda wrote the manga "Kenji". Both, Ryoichi Ikegami, the illustrator of "Otokogumi," and Yoshihide Fujiwara, the illustrator of "Kenji," were in a master-student relationship, and Fujiwara was an assistant to Ikegami.

== Writing ==
A Historical Outline of Chinese Martial Arts was originally written in 1979 and later revised when Matsuda lived in Taipei. It has appeared in a number of different editions in Chinese and Japanese and is one of eight books he has written on the martial arts.

In Matsuda's collection of dialogues, "The Art of the Soul," he talks not only with other martial arts, but also with musicians, religious scholars, and novelists.

== Major works ==
- “Zusetsu Chūgoku bujutsu-shi” (『図説中国武術史』 Eng. "Illustrated History of Chinese Martial Arts") - first published by Shinjinbutsuōraisha, later reprint is by Sōjinsha.
- “Hiden Nihon jūjutsu” (『秘伝 日本柔術』 Eng. "Secret Japanese Jiu-Jitsu") - Shinjinbutsuōraisha
- "Chūgoku bujutsu" (『中国武術』Eng. "Chinese martial arts") - Shinjinbutsuōraisha
- “Jōbuna karada o tsukuru tōyō no hihō” (『丈夫な体をつくる東洋の秘法』 Eng. "The secret of the Orient to create a strong body" ) - Kosei Publishing Co., Ltd.
- “Tafuna karada o tsukuru Chūgoku no hijutsu” (『タフな体をつくる中国の秘術』 Eng. "Chinese mystery to create a tough body") - Kosei Publishing Co., Ltd.
- “Shō hayashi ken nyūmon” (『少林拳入門』 Eng. "Introduction to Shaolin Kung Fu") - Sanpo Publishing
- “Taikyokuken nyūmon” (『太極拳入門』 Eng. "Introduction to Tai Chi") - Sanpo Publishing
- “Chūgoku kenpō keii-ken nyūmon” (『中国拳法 形意拳入門』 Eng. "Introduction to Chinese martial arts Xing Yi Quan") - Nitto Shoin
- “Hiden chin kataikyokuken nyūmon rō ka-shiki” (『秘伝 陳家太極拳入門 老架式』 Eng. "Secret Chen-style Taijiquan Introductory Old-fashioned Ceremony") - Shinsei Publishing Co., Ltd.
- “Nazo no kenpō o motomete” (『謎の拳法を求めて』 Eng. "In Search of Mysterious Quan Fa") Tokyo Shimbun Publishing Bureau
- “Matsuda ryūchi no ken Yū-ki” (『松田隆智の拳遊記』Eng. "Ryuchi Matsuda's Fist Yuuki") - BAB Japan
- “Shashin de wakaru jissen Chūgoku kenpō” (『写真でわかる実戦中国拳法』 Eng. "Actual Chinese martial arts understood by photos") - Shinsei Publishing Co., Ltd.
- “Tamashī no geijutsu” (taidan-shū) (『魂の芸術』（対談集）Eng. "Art of the Soul" (Interview Collection)) - Fukushodo
- Kenji (manga) (拳児) - Illustration by Yoshihide Fujiwara, Weekly Shonen Sunday, Shogakukan
- “Shashin de miru Chūgoku kenpō nyūmon” (『写真で見る 中国拳法入門』 Eng. "Introduction to Chinese martial arts seen in photographs") - Shinsei Publishing Co., Ltd.
- Shinpi no kenpō hakke-sho nyūmon (『神秘の拳法 八卦掌入門』 Eng. "Introduction to the Mysterious Kenpo Baguazhang") - Nitto Shoin
- “Jissen Chūgoku kenpō hi-mon kamakiri-ken nyūmon” (『実戦中国拳法 秘門蟷螂拳入門』 Eng. "Introduction to the actual battle Chinese martial arts secret gate praying mantis") - Nitto Shoin
- “Shashin de oboeru kyōmon chōken Chūgoku bujutsu nyūmon” (『写真で覚える教門長拳 中国武術入門』 Eng. "Introduction to Chinese Martial Arts") - Tsuchiya Bookstore
- “Shō hayashi ken-jutsu rakan ken kihon kara sentō gijutsu made” (『少林拳術羅漢拳 基本から戦闘技術まで』 Eng."Shaolin Kung Fu from basic to combat techniques") Tsuchiya Bookstore
- “Renzoku shashin de miru Chūgoku hoppa kenpō nyūmon ― kōrikiken mago 〓 ken-ryoku hekiken no kata to yōhō o shōkai” 『連続写真でみる 中国北派拳法入門―功力拳・孫〓拳・力劈拳の型と用法を紹介』 Eng. "Introduction to Chinese Northern Fist in Continuous Photographs-Introducing the Types and Usages of Gongfist, Son-Fist, and Rikifist(?)") - Shinsei Publishing Co., Ltd.
- “Chūgoku dentō kaimon hakkokuen ― Tsūbimon No zen'yō” (『中国伝統開門八極拳―通備門の全容』 Eng. "Chinese Traditional Opening Bajiquan-The Whole Picture of Tsubimon") Co-authored with Nogami Kotatsu. Published by Fukushodo

== See also ==
- List of Chinese martial arts
- Liu Yun Quao
- Su Yu-chang
- Kenichi Sawai
- Tetsuya Takeda

== Notes ==
1. I.E before the normalization of diplomatic relations between Japan and China.
