= Richard Kim (karate) =

American martial artist (1917–2001)

- Born: November 17, 1917; Honolulu, Hawaii, U.S.
- Died: November 8, 2001 (aged 83)
- Style: Shōrinji-ryū Karate, Okinawan Kobudo, Tai chi, Daito-ryu Aiki jujitsu, Judo, Baguazhang, Yiquan
- Teachers: Yoshida Kotaro, Arakaki Sadao, Chao Hsu Lie, Chen Chen Yuan, Kaneko, Toyama Kanken, Yabu Kentsu, Hiroshi Kinjo, Mutsu Mizuho, Kenichi Sawai, Tachibana, Wang Xiangzhai
- Rank: 10th Dan

Other information
- Notable students: Brian Ricci, Frank Gaviola, Lonnie Francis, Lenore Gaviola, Jean Chalamon, Louis Jemison, Robert Leong, Cal Avila, Richard Lee, Raymond Castilonia, Leroy Rodrigues, Don Warrener, Raymond Moore, Peter Urban, Douglas Mortley, Patrick McCarthy, Eileen Dennis, Johnny Pereira, Tony Troche, Chuck Siani, Rosemary Siani, Rod Sanford, Clarence Lee, James Miyagi, Raymond Castillonia, Nevel Bellimoria, Paul Bellimoria, Greg Mellor

Richard Kim (November 17, 1917 – November 8, 2001) was an American martial artist. He was an instructor of various disciplines, including Shōrinji-ryū Karate, Okinawan Kobudo, Daitō-ryū Aiki-jūjutsu, and Tai Chi. Kim was known for spreading traditional martial arts in North America and Europe.

== Early life and career ==
Richard Sun Sung Kim was born in Pāpaʻaloa, Hawaii. His father was Mong Young Kim, a Japanese citizen of Korean heritage, and his mother was Tok Nam Park, who was of both Korean and Japanese descent. His parents immigrated from Nagasaki, Japan to Hawaii prior to his birth. Kim began studying martial arts at age 6, starting with judo under Kaneko. After seeing a demonstration by Kentsū Yabu, who spent most of 1927 in Hawaii, Kim began studying karate under Arakaki Sadao (not to be confused with Arakaki Ankichi), who represented Yabu in Hawaii. In the 1930s, Kim also trained with Mutsu Mizuho, Tachibana, and at Sato’s Boxing Gym.

In 1935, he joined the United States Merchant Marine and, before World War II, his service took him to east Asia. In 1937, he began studying tai chi, pa kua and kenpō under Kenichi Sawai. In 1939, in addition to continuing to train under Sawai, Kim began studying Daito-ryu aikijujutsu, and Japanese and Okinawan weaponry under Kotaro Yoshida, who he came to regard as his primary Sensei. When the Attack on Pearl Harbor occurred, Kim was serving on the SS President Harrison and found himself behind enemy lines. The next day, on December 8, 1941, the ship was intercepted and the crew was taken as prisoners of war (POW). Because of his Korean-Japanese heritage and because he spoke English, Japanese, Korean, Mandarin and Russian, Kim was made a translator for the Japanese army. Kim remained a POW in China for the remainder of World War II, during which he studied Tai Chi under Chen Chen Yuan, Pakua under Chao Hsu Lie, and Yi Chaun under Wang Xiangzhai. While in Shanghai, he once again met Yoshida, who was working as a Japanese spy. On September 27, 1945, following the Japanese surrender, he and other POWs were transported by ship to Japan and then the US.

From 1945-1959, Kim traveled back and forth between the US and Japan to continue studying under Yoshida, with whom he lived several years. During this time, Kim taught martial arts in Yokohama, including to Peter Urban (who went on to found USA GoJu Karate) and Phillip Koeppel (who went on to found the United States Karate-Do Kai), who were both stationed in Japan with the U.S. Navy. Kim also trained with Sawai, Hiroshi Kinjo, Toyama Kanken, Nobuyoshi Tamura, Morihei Ueshiba, Gogen Yamaguchi, and Masatoshi Oyama, another martial artist of Korean-Japanese lineage. There has been some controversy about whether or how much he studied under or with some masters, and the lineage of the tai chi pattern that Kim taught his students, but much of it appears to have been derived from confusing Arakaki Ankichi with Arakaki Sadao, and the tai chi form appears to at least superficially resemble the first half of Yang 85. Kim is considered, regardless, to have had an encyclopedic knowledge of and technical prowess in diverse martial arts, and produced thousands of students in dozens of dojos across the world, who practice the hundreds of kata that he passed down. He and his karate-ka progeny consider kata the heart of karate, among them various versions of Kūsankū, Passai, Seisan, Gojūshiho, Pechurin/Suparinpei, Lohai, Bo (weapon), Sai (weapon), Tonfa (weapon), and others, suggesting many sources of knowledge in Kim’s martial arts training.

Kim stated that he had Daito-ryu scrolls in his possession, and had been granted a Daito-ryu menkyo kaiden, or high-level license to teach, by Yoshida. This claim had been questioned by some in the martial arts community until it was confirmed in 2024 by the Zen Bei Butoku Kai, which has the scrolls in its archives.

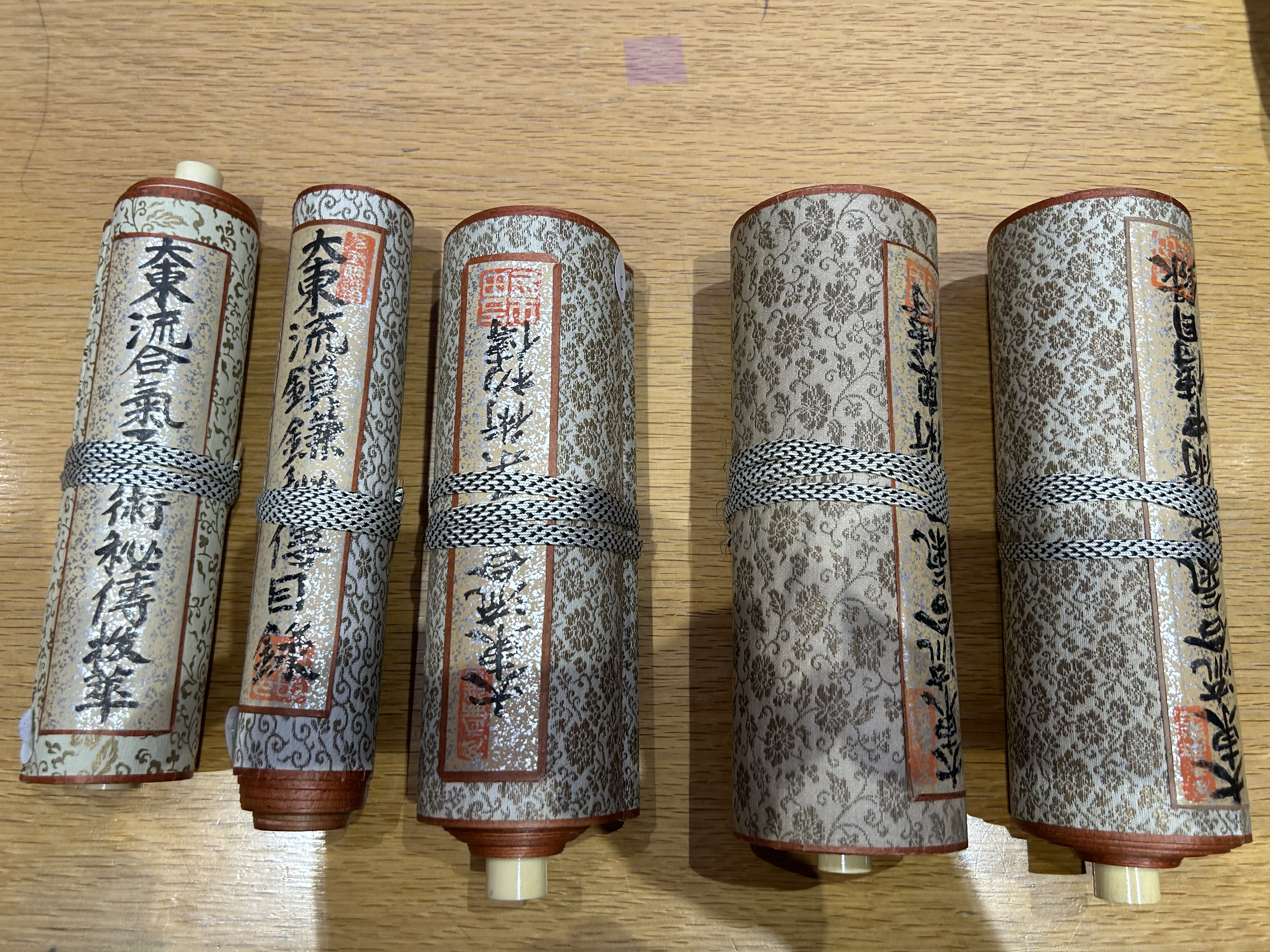
These are the Daito-ryu scrolls passed down from Yoshida Kotaro to Richard Kim to the Zen Bei Butoku Kai International.

== Teaching career ==
In 1959, Kim moved to the US permanently and began teaching martial arts in San Francisco, particularly at the Chinese YMCA. He traveled extensively throughout the United States, Canada, and Europe, teaching wherever he went. He founded branches of the Butoku Kai in the U.S., Canada, France and Germany. As well as teaching the physical aspects of the martial arts, Kim taught the philosophy, history, strategy, and spiritual aspects. According to the Original Martial Arts Encyclopedia, “Kim became the foremost karate historian residing in the U.S.”

Kim wrote a monthly column for Karate Illustrated magazine in the 1970’s, and wrote a number of books including: The Weaponless Warriors, The Classical Man, and an instructional series on weaponry (Kobudo). Kim was named Black Belt Magazine's "Karate Sensei of the Year", in 1967, and was later inducted into the Black Belt Magazine Hall of Fame. Kim was the Director of the American Amateur Karate Federation, Vice-President for the International Traditional Karate Federation (ITKF), and coaching staff for the 1980 U.S. National Karate Team. In 2000, the Hawaii Karate Kodanshakai, a multi-style karate association of senior instructors, presented Kim with the rank of Judan (10th degree black belt). He continued to teach, lecture and lead martial arts activities until his death.

Kim died on November 8, 2001. At his memorial service, Hidetaka Nishiyama of the ITKF presented Kim with the rank of Judan (10th degree black belt) posthumously. His teachings continue through a number of organizations founded by some of his senior students: the Zen Bei Butoku Kai International (Brian Ricci and Frank Gaviola), the Kokusai Butokukai (Jean Chalamon), the International Ryukyu Karate Research Society & Koryu Uchinadi (Patrick McCarthy), and the Bu Toku Do (Don Warrener). Dozens of dojos carry on the legacy of O’Sensei (Great Teacher) Kim, including in California, Michigan, Massachusetts, Canada, France, Germany and the Caribbean.

== Publications ==
1. The Weaponless Warrior. (1974). ISBN 978-0-89750-041-8
2. Kobudo, Volume 1: Okinawan Weapons of Matsu Higa. (1984). ISBN 978-0-920129-03-6
3. Kobudo, Volume 2: Okinawan Weapons of Hama Higa. (1985). ISBN 978-0-920129-08-1
4. Kobudo, Volume 3: Okinawan Weapons of Chatan Yara. (1993). ISBN 978-0-920129-10-4
5. The Classical Man. (1999). ISBN 978-0-920129-01-2
