= Kōtarō Yoshida (martial artist) =

Japanese jujutsuka

- Born: October 1883; Miyama-mura, Tamura-gun, Fukushima Prefecture, Japan
- Died: 1966 (aged 82–83); Hitachi, Ibaraki Prefecture, Japan
- Style: Daitō-ryū Aiki-jūjutsu, Yanagi-ryū Aiki Bugei, Shingetsu Muso Yanagi-ryū, Yoshin-ryū Hibuki, Kobudo
- Teacher: Takeda Sōkaku
- Rank: Kyōju Dairi (representative instructor) in Daitō-ryū Aiki-jūjutsu

Other information
- Notable students: Richard Kim, Masutatsu Oyama, Choi Yong-sul aka Asao Yoshida, Katsuyuki Kondō, Kenji Yoshida

Kōtarō Yoshida (吉田 幸太郎, Yoshida Kōtarō; October 1883–1966) was a Japanese martial artist. He was a practitioner and instructor of Daitō-ryū Aiki-jūjutsu, and Yanagi-ryū, the samurai arts of the Yoshida clan. Yoshida was well known for his skills in Japanese and Okinawan weaponry, particularly the Yari, Tessen (which he once killed a bear with), Shuriken, Katana, Tantō and Halberd.

== Early life and training ==
While by all accounts a prolific martial artist and teacher, there is little surviving documentation of Yoshida's life that has been translated into English. Because he was known to have lived an extremely ascetic lifestyle, and possibly as a result of his political activities and connections, most information on Yoshida today has been passed down through oral transmission by primary sources.

Coming from a samurai family, Yoshida started training in martial arts as a young child, learning from both his mother and father as well as others, often training in secret due to samurai restrictions imposed during the Meiji Restoration. His father was killed by a skilled swordsman, Sakagami Shuzen, when Yoshida was 13, prompting him to spend much of his adolescence in meditation and training. He trained under various—often destitute—former samurai. At 18, Yoshida killed two men with a knife after they attempted to rob him when they noticed he was training in the mountains in samurai garb. Unbeknownst to him, they were members of a gang that sought revenge, forcing Yoshida to successfully defend his home by killing the invaders with a sword and subterfuge.

Yoshida graduated from Tohoku Gakuin University in 1906, and also attended Waseda University and an American university. He became a writer and journalist, operated a newspaper company and private library in Kitami, and wrote several books.

In 1915, Yoshida apprenticed himself to Takeda Sōkaku, head of the Daitō-ryū Aiki-jūjutsu school, which would soon become popular throughout Japan as part of the public revitalization of the martial arts. At 31, Yoshida was seeking a spy school in the hopes of enacting revenge on Sakagami, something that Sōkaku warned him to forget about as Sakagami was considered very skillful. In Hokkaido, Yoshida became one of Sōkaku's top students and instructors, teaching for almost 30 years, and receiving the Kyōju Dairi. He is also credited with introducing Morihei Ueshiba, founder of Aikido, to Sōkaku.

== Military career and political beliefs ==
Yoshida served as a second lieutenant in Japanese Navy and as a Japanese spy in Manchuria during World War II. In 1942, he attended a martial arts show in Peking where he met a man who was involved in his father’s murder and who pointed him to Shanghai, where Yoshida found, confronted and killed Sakagami in a sword fight.

There have been claims that Yoshida was a member of the Kokuryukai, Amur River Society (also known as the Black Dragon Society), an ultra-nationalist organization of disenfranchised ex-samurai who promulgated "pan-Asiatic ascendancy" in line with the rise of Japanese imperialism. Others have asserted that he was a member of the Genyosha (the "Dark Ocean Society'), a previous organization founded by Toyama Mitsuru. However, the membership roles of both of these organizations are meticulously documented, and Yoshida's name does not show up in the registry of either the Genyosha or the Kokuryukai. Therefore, although it is quite likely that Yoshida had right-wing, nationalist leanings, he was not a significant figure in the major nationalist organizations of the late Meiji and Taisho periods. Regardless, Yoshida was known to eschew modernity and material possessions, choosing to live in poverty and upholding samurai tradition, such as always wearing a traditional kimono and carrying a tessen.

== Teaching legacy ==
Following World War II, Yoshida moved to Tokyo, where he trained a select few students gratis if he thought they had good character. Yoshida was very popular amongst those trying to uphold martial arts traditions, especially those who had been disaffected by the purging of the Dai Nippon Butoku Kai in 1946 by occupying Allied Forces. Martial artists such as Gōgen Yamaguchi, Toyama Kanken, Hiroshi Kinjo, Kenichi Sawai and Doshin So regularly trained with Yoshida and his students, often replicating the rigorous and multidisciplinary approach previously employed by samurai and Butoku Kai’s Budo Senmon Gakko. His teaching style was known to be very harsh, eccentric and diverse, encompassing health, nutrition, psychology, philosophy, meditation, the occult, Ki, breathing techniques, weight lifting, techniques of muscle manipulation and bone adjustments, extreme conditioning, and intense physical training including throws, Makiwara, knives and swords. He trained many martial artists, including Richard Kim (who went on to found the Zen Bei Butoku Kai), Mas Oyama (who went on to found Kyokushin Karate), Choi Yong-sul aka Asao Yoshida (who went on to found Hapkido), Tomebechi Yoshimi, Jibiki Hidemine, and Katsuyuki Kondō. His son and student, Kenji Yoshida, left Japan prior to World War II due to political differences with his father and taught Yanagi-ryū in California until his death in 1954. Estranged from his son, Yoshida took on Kim as his apprentice in 1945. Kim lived and trained with Yoshida in Yokohama for seven years, was granted the Menkyo Kaiden in Yoshida’s style of Daitō-ryū Aiki-jūjutsu, and eventually moved to California where he helped spread traditional martial arts to North America. Kim also introduced Yoshida to Oyama, who referred to Yoshida as the greatest of all his teachers, whose “mastery of the arts can only be described as perfection.” Kim and Oyama independently recounted stories of seeing Yoshida catch flies with chopsticks, which he claimed he trained to do by first starting with larger insects and working down to flies with hundreds of thousands of failures before perseverance paid off. The retelling of this story in Oyama’s This is Karate is thought to have influenced the famous fly scene in The Karate Kid.

In his later years, Yoshida became paralyzed on his left side after injuring himself by driving his bicycle in the path of a truck, stopping it from hitting a child. He spent his last years in Hitachi, Ibaraki, where he died in 1966.
