= Brian Ricci =

- Born: August 14, 1950; Massachusetts, US
- Style: Shōrinji-ryū Karate, Okinawan Kobudo, Tai chi
- Teachers: Richard Kim, Peter Ventresca
- Rank: 7th Dan

Other information
- Notable students: Edward Ricci, Dennis Mann, Brian Brandano, Jason Gould, John Wasalina, Dean Romanelli, Jon Davis, Tony Romanelli, Ryan Burtney, Wayne Newton

Brian Ricci (born August 14, 1950) is an American martial artist, special effects coordinator, stunt coordinator and film producer. He is the President of the Zen Bei Butoku Kai International.

Ricci began Karate training in 1965. He recalled, in an interview, that a chest operation preceded his decision to study karate. He started with the Shotokan style under Peter Ventresca and was awarded a black belt in 1972. Ricci sought out instruction from O’Sensei Richard Kim, first meeting him in 1973. After writing to Kim, Ricci reportedly left his job and drove from Boston to San Francisco to train with him. He described Kim’s early instruction as intensive basic training—punches, kicks, stretching and one-arm “tiger” push-ups—before substantial kata instruction. Ricci established his Butoku-Kai Martial Arts Academy in Massachusetts in 1974. He eventually became Kim’s senior student and, in 2000, promoted to 7th Dan, the highest rank Kim ever awarded and the only time he ever bestowed it upon anyone.

Ricci continues to teach and propagate martial arts, including Shōrinji-ryū Karate, Okinawan Kobudō, Daitō-ryū Aiki-jūjutsu and Tai Chi, at his dojo in Massachusetts, at students’ dojos, via hosting tournaments, and at seminars throughout North America. In 2001, when Kim was unable to attend his Zen Bei Butoku Kai annual summer camp in Guelph, Canada due to poor health, he asked Ricci to lead the training camp in his stead and Ricci has led it—along with many of Kim's and Ricci's senior students—ever since. After Kim passed away, Ricci became the President of the Zen Bei Butoku Kai International, which carries on Kim's teachings for thousands of students in dozens of dojos across North America and the Caribbean. Ricci has publicly discussed his teaching philosophy: preserving Kim’s instruction, developing each student’s abilities and treating students fairly.

Ricci is also the sensei of and former bodyguard for Wayne Newton, an avid martial artist, black belt, and part of the Zen Bei Butoku Kai since the 1980s.

In addition to his martial arts career, Ricci has also worked on over 30 films. His credits include work as a stunt performer on Second Sight (1989), stunt coordinator on Mermaids (1990), stunts on The Next Karate Kid (1994), special-effects coordinator on The Man Without a Face (1993) and Good Will Hunting (1997), special-effects on The Departed (2006), special-effects foreman on The Fighter (2010), and special-effects technician on Moonrise Kingdom (2012). Due to his expertise in martial arts and filmmaking skills he is known to put on a “very colorful special effects martial arts show.”
