= Shogen Okabayashi =

Shōgen Okabayashi (岡林 将玄, Okabayashi Ryoichi (Shōgen was his budo name.); born June 27,1949 - February 20, 2018) was a well known Kansai based aikijujutsu teacher.

He was a founding member and one of the shihan or ‘senior teachers’ of the Takumakai Daitō-ryū group, founder of the Hakohokai branch and later founder of the Hakuhō-ryū which is based upon the techniques of Daitō-ryū Aiki-jūjutsu and the Ono-ha Ittō-ryū.

Okabayashi is unique in that he spent significant amounts of time training under both Hisa Takuma, and Takeda Tokimune. Hisa was the founder of the Takumakai Daitō-ryū group and was a direct student of Daitō-ryū's founder Takeda Sōkaku. Takeda Tokimune was the son of Sōkaku and inherited the leadership of the main branch of the art. Okabayashi played a pivotal role in a growing relationship between the Takumakai and Tokimune's Daitōkan group during the 1980s and 1990s.

== Background ==
Born in 1949 in Ashiya city in Hyōgo Prefecture, Okabayashi Shōgen developed an early love for the martial arts. His first exposure to martial arts was the Shitō-ryū style of karate. In addition he is reputed to have been exposed to a style of kung-fu while living in Taiwan.

While still a young man he was attacked by a young yakuza wielding a bokken. Having developed strong abilities in striking based arts he felt hesitant to use these skills against his young assailant for fear of gravely injuring him and so blocked strike after strike on his arms eventually scaring his attacker away without retaliating. Having injured his arms in this altercation he began to feel the limitations of arts which relied predominantly upon striking.

== Study of Daitō-ryū ==
In 1972 he began studying with the group of students under Hisa Takuma who had run the Asahi Newspaper Dojo where both Ueshiba Morihei, the founder of aikido and Ueshiba's teacher Takeda Sōkaku and the founder of the art, had taught Daitō-ryū aiki-jujutsu. Hisa was one of only two people who had received a high level license in Daitō-ryū called the menkyo kaiden. The Takumakai Daitō-ryū Aikijujutsu was officially formed from this group of Asahi News group practitioners between 1973–75, depending on reference.

=== The Takumakai ===
This Kansai based group developed its own unique teaching curriculum based upon the teaching of Ueshiba Morihei, who taught them basic Daitō-ryū techniques, and Takeda Sōkaku who taught them more advanced techniques through a series of seminars which he did at the dojo over many years. Being a newspaper, the dojo members made use of the facilities to photograph the techniques they were taught after sessions and produced a photo document of the techniques to reinforce training which was called the "Soden" and still exists today. They also took a film of Ueshiba Morihei performing Daitō-ryū techniques where one can already begin to influence of his more circular aikido style coming into play. Lost for many years the film was recovered and made available in 1990s by Stanley Pranin's Aiki News group now known as the Aikido Journal.

Although already an accomplished practitioner, in interview Okabayashi Shōgen stated that he felt as if he had come to a technical road block in his training through which he could not pass. He could perform the techniques effectively but not at a speed necessary for them to be employed under the demands of real fighting. His teacher Hisa had become elderly and had suffered a debilitating stroke and so was moving to Tokyo to be cared for by his family. Okabayashi decided that he would give up the practise of Daitō-ryū. Hearing of this Hisa encouraged him rather to go study with Sōkaku's son, the current headmaster of the art, Tokimune Takeda, and gave him a letter of recommendation.

=== The Daitōkan ===
In the Daitōkan dojo in Hokkaidō, where Tokimune taught, the art had been organized differently due to differences in the way that Sōkaku had taught and changes which Tokimune had introduced into the system. Tokimune had systematized the art and given names to the techniques, resulting in a more rigidly organized curriculum. He had also pared down the wider sword system he had been taught by his father to concentrate on the Ono-ha Ittō-ryū system, albeit modified by techniques that Sōkaku had developed. Tokimune called this system Daitō-ryū 'Aiki Budō' as it emphasized a more than just jujutsu and other weapons and that in this day and age it was not merely not an art of fighting but a means of self-improvement or 'martial path'.

=== The Shoden Waza or 'Fundamental techniques' ===
Okabayashi Shōgen introduced the 'shoden waza' or first level of techniques from the Headmaster's system to the Takumakai as these techniques were not taught as part of the Takumakai's system. Sōkaku, knowing that they had received previous training from Ueshiba, announced that he would dispense with teaching the fundamentals to the Asahi News group and so they never learned them in a systematic way. For this reason the Kansai-based group had preserved a great many high level waza, or techniques, but the basic techniques had not been preserved according to the original teaching method. (It is also possible that the Tokimune created this teaching method.)

Regardless, Okabayashi had been greatly impressed and influenced by the headmaster's approach to performing Daitō-ryū techniques and felt that they provided much needed missing links in his own training. The Takumakai must have agreed as he received his kyoju dairi, or teaching license, from the Takumakai in 1980 and then received a menkyo in the sword or Ona-ha Ittō-ryū portion of the headmaster's system in 1987, which the headmaster asserted contained the heart of the system. Out of convenience this system is sometimes referred to as 'Takeda-den' or 'Sokaku-den' Ona-ha Ittō-ryū to denote its difference from the main-line Ona-ha Ittō-ryū tradition. Reputedly only six people are said to have been taught this system by Tokimune.

== Changes at the Takumakai ==
These changes in the traditional curriculum of the Takumakai system were accepted well by some of the older teachers in the Takumakai but were greeted with less enthusiasm by others creating some tensions within the group. Ōgami Shikichi, a senior teacher of the Takumakai, knowing nothing of the new techniques brought over from the Daitōkan and wishing to preserve the original curriculum he had learned under Hisa Takuma left the organization and established his own Daibukan organization after Hisa's death in 1980.

== The Birth of the Hakuhōkai ==
Wanting to implement further changes and add the weapons components he had learned under Tokimune to the Takumakai's largely weaponless system while leaving other Takumakai teachers to feel comfortable teaching in their traditional way Okabayashi Shōgen formed a separate branch school within the Takumakai organization in 1994 which he named the Hakuhōkai.

Of key important to Okabayashi's approach was a traditional concept of movement common to most koryū styles but not present in the teachings of most contemporary Daitō-ryū teachers. This concept was called 'hitoemi', and describes an idiosyncratic movement, readily seen in any Japanese period drama or koryū art, where the warrior class walk and perform techniques while lining their bodies up 'on one line' as they move forward. Okabayashi during his lengthy morning sessions acting uke, or receiver of techniques for Takeda noticed that his movements always seem to conform to this principle while other teachers, even those who had been taught by Tokimune did not always move so. When he asked the headmaster about this he reputedly replied obliquely saying "The secret of Daitō-ryū is to be found in our sword. Study the sword movements and you will find the answers. " As the koryū sword movements were based upon hitoemi Okabayashi took this to mean that he was moving in the right direction with his practise.

== The Formation of the Hakuhō-ryū Aiki Budō ==
Witnessing the growing pains and still feeling constrained by the Takumakai system which had strict rules concerning what techniques could be shown to students of different levels Okabayashi decided to form his system in 2002 in which, unusually, he decided not to use the Daitō-ryū name at all.

As there had been a power struggle over succession after the death of the headmaster between Kondo Katsuyuki and some of the Hokkaidō based Daitokan teachers who had been present while he trained at the headquarters, and with groups like the Saigo-ha and Nakamura-ha, having questionable links to Daitō-ryū making claims concerning the art, Okabayashi chose to avoid explanations and comparisons to other groups and just continue to teach the techniques he had learned from Hisa and Tokimune under a new name; the Hakuhō-ryū or 'White Phoenix School'.

Like an ancient Phoenix being reborn from the ashes anew, Okabayashi took the opportunity to reveal the koryū movements within the contemporary techniques of Daitō-ryū. He also wished to introduce what were considered more advanced portions of the art at an earlier stage in training to foster quicker learning of essential concepts and to introduce a scientific method to explain how traditional techniques function.

== External Links to Articles ==
- "Capturing the Absolute Moment" - The Itten Dojo
- A series of articles on Okabayashi Shogen and Hakuho-ryu
