= Kenji (manga) =

Japanese manga series

- First volume cover

拳児
- Genre: Martial arts
- Manga
- Written by: Ryuchi Matsuda
- Illustrated by: Yoshihide Fujiwara
- Published by: Shogakukan
- Imprint: Shōnen Sunday Comics
- Magazine: Weekly Shōnen Sunday
- Original run: January 1988 – December 1992
- Volumes: 21

Kenji (拳児) is a manga series written by Ryuchi Matsuda and illustrated by Yoshihide Fujiwara. The series follows Kenji Goh, a practitioner of the Chinese martial art Bajiquan.

Matsuda drew from his own knowledge of the martial arts when writing the manga. Kenji features bajiquan, Praying Mantis kung fu, Baguazhang, Chen-style tai chi, piguaquan, xingyiquan, Shaolin kung fu, Hung Gar, Daitō-ryū, Shōtōkan and numerous other styles, frequently featuring real-life practitioners, such as Master Su Yuchang, director and founder of the Pachi Tanglang Martial Arts Association, and Grand Master Liu Yun-Qiao (劉雲樵) from the Wu Tan Center (武壇國術推廣中心).

Kenji was serialized in Shogakukan's manga anthology Weekly Shōnen Sunday from 1988 to 1992, totaling 21 volumes.

== Plot ==
The story chronicles the life of modern-day martial artist. Kenji Goh is a teenager fond of the martial arts particularly bajiquan, which he studied from his grandfather at an early age. While Kenji's training in bajiquan is not complete, he learns other martial arts to complement his skills. Kenji's rival is Tony Tan, a Vietnamese-born Chinese gangster skilled in Hung Gar, Shaolin kung fu, as well as the Meteor Hammer (Liúxīng Chuí).

== See also ==
- Shenmue
- Bajiquan
