= Bokuyo =

Bokuyo (牧羊) may refer to:

- Bokuyō Katayama (片山牧羊, 1900-1937), Japanese painter of the nihonga style
- Bokuyōkan (牧羊館), a school of Daitō-ryū Aiki-jūjutsu
