= Kim Yoon-sang =

South Korean martial artist (1934–2021)

- Born: 김윤상; 1934; Korea
- Died: 2021 (aged 86–87)
- Other names: Kim Yun-sang
- Nationality: South Korea
- Style: Hapkido, Hapki yusul
- Trainer: Choi Yong-sool
- Rank: Master

Other information
- Occupation: Martial artist
- Notable relatives: Lee Yong-soo (co-founder)
- Notable school: Yong Sool Kwan
- Last updated on: 2010-02-24

- Kim Yoon-sang
- Hangul: 김윤상
- Hanja: 金潤相
- RR: Gim Yunsang
- MR: Kim Yunsang

Kim Yoon-sang (Korean: 김윤상; 1934–2021) was the most senior of students (achieving the rank of 9th dan) of the founder of hapkido, Choi Yong-sool (Korean: 최용술), from the hapkido founder's latter years. He is the notable Korean martial artist as the founder of Hapki yusul (Korean: 합기 유술).

== Life ==
Kim Yoon-sang was born in 1934. He began his study of Hapkido in the early 1960s under Master Chang Gedo, eventually reaching a grade of 5th Dan within the Korea Hapkido Association. In 1973, along with his friend Lee Yong-soo (Korean: 이용수), Kim travelled to Daegu to train under the founder of hapkido, Choi Yong-sool. Thereafter Kim and Lee frequently travelled to Daegu to receive private lessons from Choi first at his school and then after it closed in 1976 in any available space.

At the request of Choi Yong-sool, Kim and Lee opened up a school for training (see: dojang) in their hometown of Geumsan in 1978. In 1980 the school was named the Yong Sool Kwan (Korean: 용술관) and Kim was appointed director of the school. After the establishing of this training facility Choi Yong-sool often came to teach at the school and Kim and Lee continued to travel to Daegu to train with their master.

== Accomplishments ==
- Established the Yong Sool Kwan in 1980.
- Was awarded with a 9th degree black belt by Choi through the Korea Hapkido Association in 1986.
- Compiled photographic records of Choi Yong-sool performing techniques.
- Renamed their system Hapki yusul to differentiate what they did from other hapkido groups.
- Erected a special headstone for the grave of Choi Yong-sool in 2000.
- Hosted a memorial event of Choi Yong-sool's death, every 5 years. The first was in 2006, followed by two more, one in 2011 and the next in 2016. These events were attended by students from all over the world.
- Taught at several seminars in Germany, Australia England and Italy, February 2008.

== See also ==
- Korean martial arts
- Hapkido
- Hapki yusul
