= Katsuyuki Kondō =

Japanese martial artist

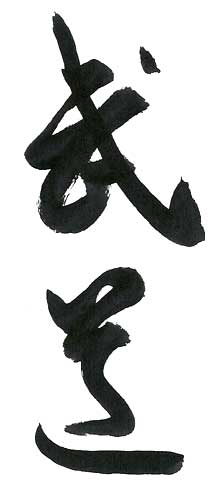
The word budō (martial arts) penned by Katsuyuki Kondō

Katsuyuki Kondō (近藤 勝之, Kondō Katsuyuki) is a Japanese martial artist. He received Daitō-ryū Aiki-jūjutsu Kyōju Dairi from Tokimune Takeda in 1974. Kondo is an authority on jujutsu and calligraphy. In 1988, Takeda Tokimune appointed Kondo Katsuyuki, then the head of all Tokyo Daito-ryu Aikibudo Branches, to be both Representative of the Headmaster (soke dairi) and Director of the Overseas Headquarters (kaigai hombucho) in regard to Daito-ryu Aikibudo. That same year, Tokimune granted Kondo the menkyo kaiden (license of full transmission) certificate in Daito-ryu Aikijujutsu, thus formally passing on the Main Line Daito-ryu tradition.
