= Takuma Hisa =

Japanese martial artist

Takuma Hisa (久 琢磨 Hisa Takuma, c.1895 – October 31, 1980) was a prominent Japanese martial artist, early student in Daito-ryu aiki-jujutsu of both Sokaku Takeda and aikido founder Morihei Ueshiba.

Born in Kōchi Prefecture, Japan; in his youth, he was a sumo wrestler. He was captain of the sumo club at Kobe Business School (now Kobe University) and won the All-Kansai Student Sumo Championship. He later became the director of General Affairs at the Asahi News in Osaka. He was advised to learn the technique of Daito-ryu aiki-jujutsu for self-defense and was introduced to Ueshiba, becoming one of his early prewar students. Later (in 1936) he studied directly under Takeda when the latter came teaching at the Asahi News dojo. He received the Kyoju Dairi (teaching certification) a year later and was awarded the Menkyo kaiden rank in 1939, directly from Takeda. He later became one of the most prominent teachers of Daito-ryu aiki-jujutsu. In 1959, he established the Kansai Aikido Club to teach the techniques of Ueshiba and Takeda. Hisa is also remembered for compiling a catalogue of techniques from photographs taken at the Asahi News dojo featuring both Ueshiba and Takeda. The catalogue constitutes today an invaluable historical source for the early development of aikido. He also held the rank of 8th dan in sumo and 7th dan in judo.

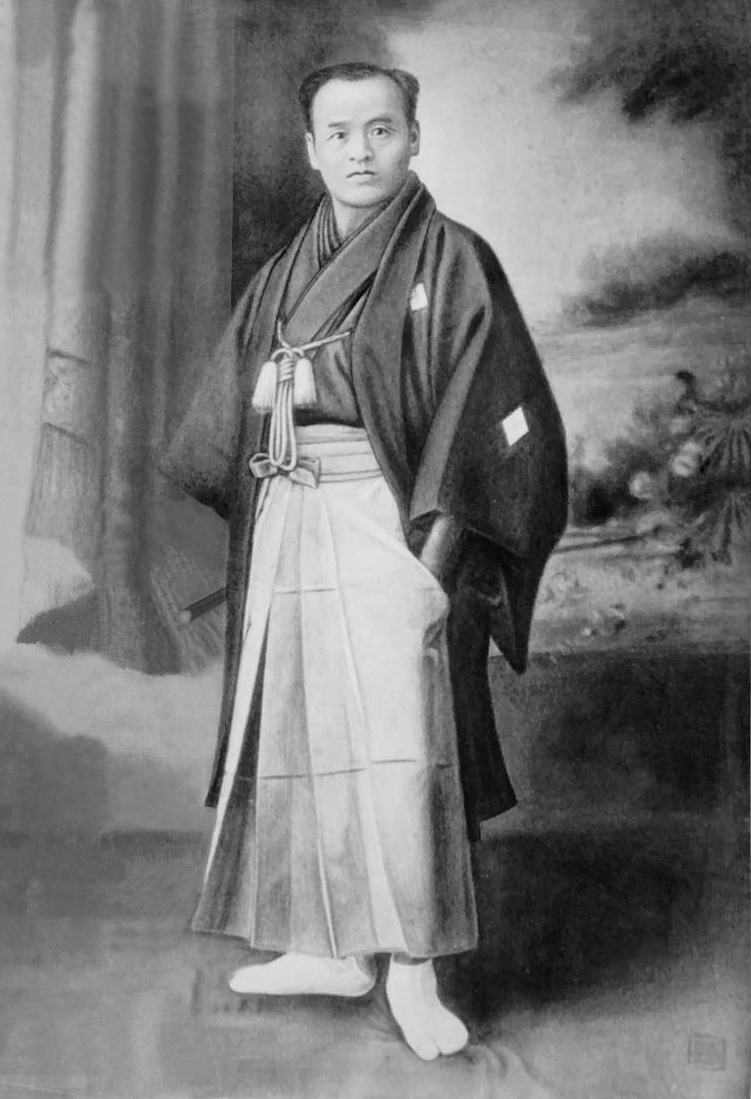
Retouched photograph of Sokaku Takeda circa 1888

== See also ==
- Daito-ryu (Hisa branch)
- Shogen Okabayashi (Takumakai section)
