= Oshikiuchi =

Set of behaviors for formal circumstances

Japanese name
- Kanji: 御式内
- Hiragana: おしきうち
Transcriptions
- Revised Hepburn: oshikiuchi
- Kunrei-shiki: osikiuti

Oshikiuchi (御式内, o-shikiuchi) is a term referring to some sort of techniques for use in formal circumstances. The term itself translates literally to something like "honorable manner for indoors". Scholars dispute whether oshikiuchi is literally a set of manners or etiquette for use on formal occasions, or a set of martial arts techniques specialized for use in formal situations where the wearing of weapons is restricted, such as the palace of one's lord. Takeda Sōkaku, the modern founder of Daitō-ryū Aiki-jūjutsu, claimed that it was a secret martial art passed down through members of his family in the Aizu domain, and that he combined in some way with his family's martial arts, which he eventually taught publicly as Daitō-ryū. Such a claim is supported by his descendants, but unverified.

== See also ==
- Daitō-ryū Aiki-jūjutsu
