= Asayama Ichiden-ryū =

Japanese koryū martial art

Asayama Ichiden-ryū (浅山一伝流) is a Japanese koryū martial art founded in the late Muromachi period by Asayama Ichidensai Shigetatsu (浅山一伝斎重晨).

== Asayama Ichidensai Shigetatsu ==
There are often conflicting stories among Martial art schools that have many branches about who actually founded the school and how. In some cases, this stems from Japanese Samurai being fond of changing their names. Asayama Ichiden Ryu Taijutsu is one of those schools. The founder went by many names, and there are many different and conflicting stories about the founder and the school. Several websites discuss the same figure but with different given names.

== History ==
Asayama Ichiden Ryu Taijutsu was founded by Asayama Mitsugoro Ichidensai in 1566. He was the third son of a military expert (gunshi) who was named Asayama Genban Minamoto no Yoshitada Ichiyosai. His father was in the employ of Akai Aku Uemon Kageto, who was the Lord of the Amada and Hikami Districts. The story goes that at the age of 12, Ichidensai had a dream with Fudo Myo Oh, which resulted in enlightenment for him and the subsequent founding of Asayama Ichiden Ryu. This is not the only story. Other traditions state that the Ichiden Ryu lineage began when Marume Mondonoshô Norikichi, and a student of his, Kuniie Yauemon, instructed Asayama Ichidensai Shigetatsu. Ichidensai then spread his tradition across the country. Another tradition claims that he learned from a variety of teachers, including Kamiizumi Hidetsuna, Okuyama Saemondayu Tadanobu, Nakamura Senjurô, and the Yoshioka family in the capital There also may be a connection with Tamiya Ryu. Ichidensai died on the 5th day of the first month of the 4th year of Jôkyô (1687) at the age of 78. He had numerous students, and many schools spawned off of the main branch.

== The school ==
Asayama Ichiden-ryu was founded by Asayama Ichidensai Shigetatsu as solely an atemi (striking) and gyakute (reversal) art, aside from jujutsu, the art also contains gyakute-jutsu, a rare reversal art utilizing a short wooden pole 37 cm or 25 cm in length. The art is learned first bare-handed, but its techniques may also be used with a steel fan. There are many different branches in different parts of Japan and in the United States, each with their own characteristics.

The art was initially taught in the Aizu domain, which is the same area that Daito Ryu originated hence a possible reason for some experts noting similarities in the various waza that are shared. Eventually the art was promoted throughout the region by the Tanaka House, who were elders on council to the Lord of that area. During the Meiji period (1868 to 1912), the head of the art was named Tamatso Tanaka, the 12th generation head of the art. Its current popularity was due to Tanaka's appointment of Okura Hisajiro Naoyuki as Style head. Okura had a dojo in the Koiskikawa area of Tokyo. He had two senior students, Adachi Yushio who continued the tradition and also Naganuma Tsuneyuki, who married his daughter. As a result, Naganuma was given the responsibility of heading the art. He subsequently appointed his second son, Yoshiyuki, as the head of the art, he left the position and turned it over to a senior student named Ueno Takashi, after his fathers (Tsuneyuki) death, Yoshiyuki returned and began teaching the art again. There are conflicting stories as to who was appointed the successor to Ueno Takashi. Several branches sprang up in the coming years from various senior students. These senior students had no claims to succession. Each Started their own branches with their own characteristics. One such divergence belongs to the Nagano Ryu branch which teaches characteristics founded by Yukio Nakamura who was a student of the Head Master Okura Hisajiro Naoyuki in the Koikikawa Dojo near present-day Tokyo. However, there is another branch that claims Sato Kinbei as the successor in 1954, while another claims Kaminaga Shigemi was appointed. Kinbei taught many people the art of Asayama Ichiden Ryu. Given the amount of divergence in the art, it is entirely possible that many of these claims have some merit.

In addition, as a separate line of transmission, the teachings passed from Takeishi Kensō, a former samurai of the Mito Domain, to Matsumoto Mitsugu Kanehisa have been carried on in Tokyo, Kanagawa, and Chengdu, China.

== The structure of the School ==
Some of the schools teaching Asayama Ichiden Ryu are predominantly kenjutsu schools now. Many of those schools that teach the jujutsu/ taijutsu aspects of the art have codified the art into various levels including Shoden (first transmission), Chuden (middle level transmission), Okuden (hidden transmission), Kuden (oral transmission) amongst others. The original art's three main areas known as the:

1. Ten no Maki (天の巻 - Heaven Scroll) This scroll focused upon kenjutsu or the sword art
2. Jin no Maki (人の巻 - Man / Person Scroll) This scroll focused upon the arts of the staff known as bojutsu
3. Chi no Maki (地の巻 - Earth Scroll) This scroll focused upon empty hand defence techniques (jujutsu)

Ueno Takashi attempted to keep the transmission of the art as pure as possible and to this end began an e-maki (picture scroll) which showed the kata of the school. Within this lineage, however, the transmission of waza was limited to the Chi no Maki and some Hishigi Den (literally ‘crushing transmission’ or joint manipulation techniques) and kuden (oral transmission of "secrets") as these were the only areas transmitted forward by Naganuma Tsuneyuki. The Chi no Maki of traditional Asayama Ichiden Ryu is structured into several areas, versus the shoden, chuden, okuden etc. that are seen in many schools. The Chi no Maki has the following areas:

Soden Mokuroku (相伝目録) :

1. Tehodoki Shoden (手解初伝)
2. Tehodoki Okuden (手解奥伝)
3. Jodan no Kurai (上段之位)
4. Chudan no Kurai (中段之位)
5. Gedan no Kurai (下段之位)
6. Okuden no Kurai (奥伝之位)
7. Idori no Kurai (居捕之位)
8. Shioku no Kurai (至奥之位)
9. Shoto no Kurai (小刀之位)
10. Tachidori no Kurai (太刀取之位)

There are several traditions still alive. Some of the better known traditions from the Asayama Ichiden Ryu Taijutsu are Chi no Maki, Okura-den, Yokohama-den, Jinenkan under Fumio Manaka, Genbukan under Tsunehisa (aka: Shoto) Tanemura, Nagano Ryu Heihou (Nagano Ryu Kyokai) under Jamie Ellerbe teaches a branch of Asayama Ichiden Ryu founded by Yukio Nakamura. This branch today is called Nagano Ryu Heihou but it is a rapidly growing branch in the United States and Japan.

A student of Sato Kinbei, Duke Meade, lives in the US and teaches Asayama Ichiden-ryu amongst the other traditions he received from Sato Kinbei.

Llermo Vendiola, menkyokaiden ( license holder ) of this school, is actively teaching Asayama Ichiden-ryu.

Nakashima Atsumi, one of the menkyokaiden (license holder) of this school, is actively teaching Asayama Ichiden-ryu.

A student of Kaminaga Shigemi Sensei, David Alonso (menkyo kaiden), lives in Japan and teaches Asayama Ichiden-ryu and Yagyu Shinkage-ryu in Nara Pref.

== Arts taught ==
The system teaches several weapon arts including kenjutsu, iaijutsu, kamajutsu', bōjutsu and unarmed arts (taijutsu). Jujutsu, Gyakute-jutsu.
