= Okabayashi =

Okabayashi (written: 岡林) is a Japanese surname. Notable people with the surname include:

- Nobuyasu Okabayashi (岡林 信康, born 1946), Japanese singer
- Shogen Okabayashi (岡林 将玄, born 1949), Japanese jujutsuka
- Okabayashi Shoken, Japanese samurai
- Yuji Okabayashi (岡林 裕二, born 1982), Japanese professional wrestler
- Yūki Okabayashi (岡林 勇希, born 2002), Japanese baseball player
- Gustavo Okabayashi (岡林 勇希, born 1994), Japanese-Brazilian engineer

== See also ==
- 6737 Okabayashi, a main-belt asteroid
