= Hapki yusul =

Korean martial art

Hapkiyusul
- Also known as: Hapki Yu Sul, Hapkiyusul
- Country of origin: Korea
- Creator: Choi Yong Sul
- Famous practitioners: Kim Yun Sang
- Ancestor arts: Daitō-ryū Aiki-jūjutsu
- Descendant arts: Hapkido, Kuksoolwon, Hwarangdo
- Official website: http://www.hapkiyusul.com

Korean name
- Hangul: 합기유술
- Hanja: 合氣柔術
- RR: Hapgi yusul
- MR: Hapki yusul

Hapkiyusul (Korean: 합기유술) is a Korean martial art derived from Japanese Daitō-ryū Aiki-jūjutsu as it was brought to Korea by Choi Yong Sul.

== Hapkido and Hapkiyusul ==
Choi Yong Sul (Korean: 최용술) is often seen as the source of Korean hapkido. After Choi returned to Korea in 1946 he started teaching a martial art he had learned in Japan, Daito Ryu Aikijujitsu. His initial students and their students, etc., adapted these techniques to their own needs and added techniques from other Korean and non-Korean styles, forming Hapkido, Kuksool Won, Hwarangdo, Tukgongmoosul, Hanmudo, Hanpul, etc.,.

Kim Yun Sang a.k.a. Kim Yoon-Sang (김윤상) began using the term "Hapkiyusul" in 1987, a year after Choi Yong Sul died, in order to differentiate what he had learned from Choi Yong-Sul and was teaching from mainstream Hapkido. Choi Yong Sul authorized Kim to use Choi's own name ("Yong Sul") as the name of his kwan (Yong Sul Kwan (Korean: 용술관)). Hapkiyusul members practice the original techniques and learning/teaching process as taught to Kim Yun Sang by Choi. Choi's students were told that all of these techniques (including the kicks and hand strikes taught by Choi) were Daito Ryu Aikijujitsu. The use of hapki (better known as aiki in Japanese traditions) is greatly emphasized.

== Hapkiyusul in the World ==
Outside of Korea there are a few dedicated people who actively train in Hapkiyusul. At the moment there at least 30 non-Koreans who hold a black belt in Hapkiyusul. Schools or practice groups exist in the US (Washington, Texas), Australia, Brazil, England, Germany, Italy and the Netherlands.

Kim Yun Sang (1934-2021) held seminars in Australia at least every other year and visited several European countries in February 2008, teaching seminars in Germany, England and Italy.

== See also ==
- Hapkido
