= Kyōju Dairi =

Kyōju Dairi (教授代理, "representative instructor") is a teaching certificate employed by various Japanese koryū, or traditional martial arts.

Employed by Sōkaku Takeda in the early part of his career to designate a high level of understanding of the Daitō-ryū aiki-jūjutsu system, later he added a higher level designation known as the menkyo kaiden. Thus his earliest high-ranking students such as Sagawa Yukiyoshi (who was once asked to serve as the inheritor of the art and so we must assume had a very thorough understanding of the art), were only awarded the kyōju dairi. Some of those known to have received this certificate from Sokaku were Yukiyoshi Sagawa, Taiso Horikawa, Kodo Horikawa, Kōtarō Yoshida, Morihei Ueshiba and Takuma Hisa.
