= Hakkō-ryū =

Style of jujutsu

- Focus: Grappling
- Country of origin: Japan
- Creator: Okuyama Ryuho
- Famous practitioners: Okuyama Ryuho
- Parenthood: Daitō-ryū Aiki-jūjutsu
- Descendant arts: Shorinji Kempo; its own offshoots

Hakkō-ryū (八光流) or Hakkō-ryū Jūjutsu (八光流柔術) is a school or 'style' of jujutsu descended from Daito-ryu founded in 1941 by Okuyama Ryuho (1901–1987) a student of Sokaku Takeda and a practitioner of shiatsu. This style of self-defense focuses on the qi meridian points sensitive to pain so that a defender can create sharp distracting pain to an attacker but without causing serious injury to the person, and it can therefore be considered a humanitarian martial technique.

The school is now headed by his son who inherited the name Nidai Soke Okuyama Ryuho. The headquarters or honbu dojo is located in Ōmiya-ku, Saitama, Saitama Prefecture.

== Meaning of the name ==
Hakko Ryu in a Japanese term can be translated as "The Style of the Eighth Light," or specifically "eighth light school." In the color spectrum there are normally seven bands of color that are visible. Hakko, meaning the "eighth light", refers to the ultraviolet band, a band of light that is invisible to human but responsible for causing sunburn while at the beach. This invisible yet powerful band of light is used as an analogy for Hakko Ryu, whereby "the faint and weak in appearance comes surprising strength". The number eight can also represents infinity in Japan, the name therefore suggests an infinite number of techniques can be derived from it. Ryu means the school or system of martial art. Hakko Ryu Jujutsu training employs strategies to defend oneself using subtle movements rather than strength, yet powerful in execution, not unlike the ultraviolet rays of the sun.

== History ==
Hakko Ryu was founded in 1941 by Okuyama Ryuho. Okuyama was an instructor of Daito Ryu Aikijujutsu which he studied from two people: Kyoju Dairi Matsuda (Toshimi) Hosaku and later Takeda Sokaku himself. In 1938 Okuyama finished his studies with Takeda and published a martial art text called Daito-ryu Goshinjutsu (The Daito System of Self-Protection), later founded the Dai-Nippon Shidokai (Greater Japan Way of the Samurai Association) and began teaching what he called Daito Hiden Shido (Secret Daito-Ryu Way of the Samurai). Okuyama's first Dojo was located in Asahikawa and was called Nippon Shidokai Ryubukan. In 1939 he moved to Kanda and opened another dojo called Dai Nihon Shidokai. This marked the beginning of the split from Daito-ryu, as by this time Takeda was very old and his son Tokimune was still very young. Seeing no place for advancement in the Daito-ryu school, and being a skilled medical and martial person, Okuyama began to form his own system based on Daito-ryu Jujutsu and Daito-ryu Aiki no jutsu as well as his experience in other forms of bujutsu.

The Hakko-ryu Kaiso Hokokusai (ceremony proclaiming the founding of Hakko-ryu) was held on June 1, 1941 at the Shiba Tenso Jinja (Shinto shrine in the Shiba district of Tokyo). On that date Hakko-ryu was formed and Okuyama took the pen name Ryuho (spine of the Dragon). The Hakko-ryu Kobujuku (private school for Hakko-ryu study) was located in Kanda district of Tokyo. During World War II the allied Bombing grew close; Okuyama and his family fled and joined the Mount Haguro sect of Shugendo (a mixture of Buddhism and Shintoism) in Yamagata Prefecture. The Hakko-ryu Kobujuku burned down during the bombing of Tokyo. In 1947 he moved to Omiya City (Saitama City) and founded the Hakko-ryu So Hombu Dojo (Hakko-ryu Juku Hombu Dojo). This is the home city of Hakko-ryu today.

== Technique and schooling ==
Hakko Ryu is a style of self-defence that targets the pressure points and nerves sensitive to pain. The sensitive pressure points or tsubo lie along the meridians keiraku through which the qi flows, and striking these points can create momentary intense pain. This allows the defender to control, subdue or warn off an attacker. The technique relies on efficiency rather than power and strength, and its training emphasizes stretching, flexibility, and the suppleness of the body. It employs joint techniques, but has few strikes and kicks, and tai sabaki are seen in many of its techniques. Its throws often use joint-locks and are similar to those of Daitō-ryū Aiki-jūjutsu and Aikido rather than Jujutsu or Judo.

While Hakko-ryu techniques are closely related to Daito-ryu, it is the influence of Oriental medicine and a strict moral code that distinguishes the style. The Koho Igaku Shiatsu system is taught to its members at all levels and is a requirement for those holding Menkyo Shihan and higher licenses. The jujutsu system's emphasis is placed on pressure points and manipulation of the opponent's body through both the skeletal structure and the body's meridians; this helps give Hakko-ryu its trademark of appearing weak but being powerful in application.

The techniques of Hakko-ryu are passed on in the form of kata or waza sets known as Ge. Each kata has a number of Omote (surface) techniques that must be learned before the student can progress to the next level. Each level also contains Kihon waza, which introduce the core principles of Hakkoryu to the student; the Omote techniques are not to be changed but handed down to the next generation, and so forth. They are as follows:

1. Shodan-Gi
2. Nidan-Gi
3. Sandan-Gi
4. Yondan-Gi

Besides the Omote, Kihon, and Gensoku Of Hakko-ryu, some subjects taught include concepts such as:

1. Kamae (combative engagement posture/stance)
2. Hara/Tanden/Ki (center of gravity, how it may best be concentrated)
3. Kime (focus)
4. Tsukuri/Kuzushi/Kake (preparing/off balancing/executing)
5. Ma ai (combative engagement distance)
6. Sen (combative initiative or "timing")
7. Suki (detecting weaknesses/openings)

After Yondan the system uses the older Koryu Menkyo licenses. A student must be invited by Okuyama to train with him in the upper waza. To obtain an invitation the student must be referred by a Shihan in good standing with the Hombu. Upon receiving the invitation, the student may travel to Japan and stay with the Okuyama family for a period of time for training or receive training from him during his visits outside Japan.

== Organization ==
Hakko-ryu is governed in an autocratic nature. Hakkoryu Jujutsu and Koho Igaku Shiatsu belong solely to the Okuyama family. Okuyama has total authority, and while he is advised by senior Shihan and councils, his word is final. This has been difficult for some to take, but especially for non-Japanese which has resulted in the expulsion of some over the years. There are few people outside Japan recognized as legitimate Shihan and teachers. Okuyama states that "Some may use the word 'Hakko' (八光) in the names of their systems. Interested parties are advised that many have no relationship to Hakkoryu. Many desire the legitimacy of such affiliation without the accompanying training, efforts, sacrifice, responsibilities, limitations, and burdens actual membership requires. This is true of those who have never had any training or affiliation at all with Hakkoryu as well as those who have been expelled or claim they have retired but continue to teach."

Hakkoryu is distinctly separate and apart from Hakko Denshin Ryu and other schools who use the name "Hakko" within the name of their schools. Hakkoryu is an internationally registered trademark.

== Splinter groups by former students ==
- Daiwa-Ryu founded in 1979 by Shinsei Harada and Eiichi Tanaka, both students of Shodai Soke Okuyama.
- Jigen Ryu, (慈眼流) founded in 1990 by Shinsei Harada, a direct student of Shodai Soke Okuyama and holder of Menkyo-Kaiden Sandaikichu.
- Hakko Denshin-Ryu founded in 1998 by three former Menkyo-Kaiden Sandaikichu students of Shodai Soke Okuyama; Yashuhiro Irei, Michael LaMonica and Antonio Garcia.
- Hakko Densho-Ryu founded in 1998 by Dennis Palumbo, a direct student of Shodai Soke Okuyama and holder of Menkyo-Kaiden Sandaikichu.
- Kenshinkan Nihon Aikijujutsu founded in 2022 by Col. (ret) Roy J. Hobbs, a personal student of Shodai Soke Okuyama from whom he attained Shihan Menkyo, and later Menkyo-Kaiden (which included "Sandakichu" waza) from Yashuhiro Irei.
- Kokodo Jujutsu founded in 2001 by Yashuhiro Irei, personal student of Shodai Soke Ryuho Okuyama, awarded the grade of Menkyo-Kaiden Sandaikichu and the title of Jodai.
- Dentokan Aikijujutsu, a combination of the original techniques of Hakko Ryu to Shihan level from Shodai Soke Okuyama and the Kaiden techniques of Kokodo Jujutsu of Irie Yasuhiro, led by Neil Malpas Menkyo-Kaiden Sandaikichu.
- Hakkō Dentō-ryū (八光伝統流) founded by Yoshishige Okai, a direct student of Shodai Soke Okuyama and holder of Menkyo-Kaiden Sandaikichu.

== Notable students ==
Shorinji Kempo founder Doshin So (宗道臣, 1911–1980) was a student of Hakkoryu.

== Sources ==
- Secrets of Hakko ryu Jujutsu by Dennis G Palumbo, Paladin press 978-0-87364-422-8 ISBN 0-87364-422-0
- Secret Nidan techniques of Hakko ryu by Dennis G Palumbo, Paladin press ISBN 978-0-87364-455-6
- Essence of Hakko ryu Sandan Gi techniques By Dennis G. Palumbo, Paladin press 978-0-87364-455-6
