= Combat Hapkido =

Martial art system

- ICHF Crest
- Also known as: Chon-Tu Kwan Hapkido
- Focus: Hybrid
- Country of origin: United States
- Date of formation: 01/01/1992
- Creator: John Pellegrini
- Parenthood: primarily Hapkido
- Ancestor arts: Daitō-ryū Aiki-jūjutsu, Hapkido
- Olympic sport: No
- Official website: www.dsihq.com

- Combat Hapkido
- Hangul: 전투관 합기도
- Hanja: 戰鬪館 合氣道
- Revised Romanization: Jeontugwan Hapgido
- McCune–Reischauer: Chŏnt'ugwan Hapkido

Combat Hapkido (known in Korean as Chon-Tu Kwan Hapkido 전투관 합기도) is an eclectic modern Hapkido system founded by John Pellegrini in 1990. Taking the next step in 1992 Pellegrini formed the International Combat Hapkido Federation (ICHF) as the official governing body of Combat Hapkido. Later, in 1999, the ICHF was recognized by the Korea Kido Association and the World Kido Federation, collectively known as the Kido Hae, as the Hapkido style Chon Tu Kwan Hapkido. The World Kido Federation is recognized by the Government of South Korea as an organization that serves as a link between the official Martial Arts governing body of Korea and the rest of the world Martial Arts community. The founder of Combat Hapkido was very clear in his statement that he did not invent a new martial art. He stated "I have merely structured a new Self-Defense system based upon sound scientific principles and modern concepts. For this reason Combat Hapkido is also referred to as the "Science of Self-Defense". Combat Hapkido is a new interpretation and application of a selected body of Hapkido techniques. The word "Combat" was added to Combat Hapkido to distinguish this system from Traditional Hapkido styles and to identify its focus as Self-Defense.

The style employs joint locks, pressure points, grappling holds, throws, hand strikes, and low-lying kicks, and trains practitioners to either counter or preemptively strike an imminent attack to defend one's self. In common with many Hapkido styles, it also emphasizes small circular motion, non-resisting movements, and control of an opponent through force redirection and varied movement and practitioners seek to gain advantage through footwork, distractive striking and body positioning to employ leverage.

== Description ==
Combat Hapkido does not incorporate certain traditional Hapkido techniques which it deemed impractical for modern self-defense scenarios. For example, acrobatic break falls, jump/spinning kicks, forms, and meditation have been omitted, along with the removal of weapons such as swords and other weapons which would be impractical and not typically carried in modern society. Combat Hapkido's strategy differs from traditional Hapkido because it includes adopting features from styles like Sambo, Judo, Jujutsu, Vale Tudo, Western Boxing, and Daitō-ryū Aiki-jūjutsu to enhance its core curriculum. For instance, criticism has been raised asserting that traditional styles of Hapkido do not provide extensive ground self-defense curriculum; Combat Hapkido attempts to address this by researching and incorporating grappling techniques from varying styles. Another instance is the incorporation of derived-versions of Jeet Kune Do trapping and entering techniques to enhance transitions into Combat Hapkido's core joint locking and throwing techniques. Combat Hapkido's core techniques rely heavily on the traditional Hapkido techniques that the ICHF determined to have the most practical applications for their goal of modern self-defense. The core curriculum has been organized into 10 basic levels or ranks and extensive reference materials, including a complete video reference library, are provided to schools and individual students through the ICHF Headquarters in Fernandina Beach, Florida. All training in Combat Hapkido is reinforced with extensive training seminars, with most months containing multiple seminars located throughout the United States and Internationally. In addition to the core curriculum, the ICHF researches and develops "modules" that are compatible with the core curriculum and encourages students to explore them. Some examples of these such "modules" are "Stick and Knife Combatives", "Ground Survival", "Combat Throws", "Anatomical Target Striking/Pressure Points", "Trapping", "Cane", "Dan Bong", and "Weapons Disarming". New modules are supported by DVDs, seminars, and local instruction conducted by certified instructors of each course. ICHF students are required to know the core curriculum for promotion and are encouraged to study various optional modules as well. Instructors may require their students to learn some of these additional modules to advance levels.

== Rank Structure ==
Combat Hapkido uses a ten belt rank system for both the non-black belt and Black Belt ranks with the difficulty and the number of techniques gradually increasing with each belt. The content of each rank can vary from school to school; however, the core curriculum of Combat Hapkido must be taught to each rank before the promotion can be sent to the ICHF Headquarters for certifying. All rank certification is done directly through the ICHF Headquarters in Florida and is kept on file to insure that each student meets the proper time in grade requirements. For higher Dan grade black belt tests, students must appear before Grandmaster John Pellegrini for testing either directly at the Headquarters or at one of the many seminars held around the country. For those seeking international Dan Ranking the International Combat Hapkido Federation offers the option to have black belt ranks recognized through the Kido Hae.

Many Combat Hapkido Schools use the following system:

Combat Hapkido
Basic Rank Structure											Advanced Rank Structure									
Hangul	십급	구급	팔급	칠급	육급	오급	사급	삼급	이급	일급	일단	이단	삼단	사단	오단	육단	칠단	팔단	구단	십단
Hanja	十級	九級	八級	七級	六級	五級	四級	三級	二級	一級	初段	二段	三段	四段	五段	六段	七段	八段	九段	十段
Roman	10th Gup	9th Gup	8th Gup	7th Gup	6th Gup	5th Gup	4th Gup	3rd Gup	2nd Gup	1st Gup	1st Dan	2nd Dan	3rd Dan	4th Dan	5th Dan	6th Dan	7th Dan	8th Dan	9th Dan	10th Dan
Rank	White belt	Yellow belt	Orange belt	Green belt	Purple belt	Blue belt	Brown belt	Red belt	Red & Black	Black & White	Black belt	Black belt	Black belt	Black belt	Black belt	Black belt	Black belt	Black belt	Black belt	Black belt
Images																				
Instructor Rank Structure					Assistance/Apprentice Instructor						Instructor	Senior Instructor			Master Instructor	Senior Master		Grandmaster		

== Ground Survival ==
Combat Hapkido's "Ground Survival" program previously referred to as the "Ground Grappling" program was developed to create a ground self-defense program where the purpose is to survive encounters on the ground by escaping and evading along with takedown prevention methods. The program's focus on ground self-defense utilizes transitions from ground positions to standing positions avoiding long extended confrontations on the ground, which the curriculum addresses but does not encourage. The Ground Survival program blends with Combat Hapkido's core curriculum and adopted aspects of Combat Hapkido's Anatomical Targeting Strategies (Pressure Point) program utilizing small and large joint locking and pressure point techniques. To develop this program, Combat Hapkido Master Instructors experienced in the grappling arts researched different styles such as Brazilian Jiu-Jitsu, Vale tudo and Combat Sambo, with additional technical assistance from grappling experts in Brazilian Jiu-Jitsu such as Carlson Gracie Jr.

== Anatomical Striking/Pressure Points/Pain Compliance ==
The “Tactical Pressure Points”(TPP) program was developed to enhance the effectiveness of Combat Hapkido self-defense system's core curriculum of manipulations of an attacker's body by targeting vulnerable areas, weak points, pressure points, or vital points of the body to produce significant pain or other effects. This form of target striking is called pain compliance and generally, but not always, leads to an immediate response by the attacker. This response can then be taken to transition into another technique from the Combat Hapkido curriculum. This material has also been specifically designed and modified for the Law-enforcement community, called “Anatomical Compliance Tactics” (ACT) and is taught as part of the ICHF's "International Police Defensive Tactics Institute"(IPDTI) course.

== Trapping ==
The Combat Hapkido Trapping program is designed to be the blocking method of the Combat Hapkido System since Combat Hapkido does not use the "Traditional" hard blocks of the Traditional martial arts. The Trapping Program is designed to become reactionary and reflexive and not to impede or stop incoming attacks. The techniques and drills in this program are based to develop specific technical attribute from Jeet Kune Do or Aikido that blend drills and techniques with Combat Hapkido. This Trapping program is a way to gain advantage over an opponent by manipulating them to accomplish a finishing technique, such as strikes, joint-locks, and throws or to simply buy time to escape.

== Combat Hapkido Weapons ==
=== Cane ===
The cane is generally referred to as the weapon of choice for most Hapkido Systems because of its flexible and easily adaptive techniques. Combat Hapkido along with other systems incorporate self-defense techniques using the cane into their training curricula for this exact reason. However, the reason the ICHF chooses the cane as one of their preferred self-defense weapons is due to its modern real world self-defense applications. A typical walking cane, defined as one not concealing a firearm, blade, or of unnatural weight, within most state and national jurisdictions is generally recognized as one of the few blunt objects allowed to be carried in public by law. Due to the cane's legal status, ready availability to acquire, general lightweight carry and being a cheap weapon to use, Combat Hapkido developed a "Cane" focusing on the flexibility and reliability available with this useful tool. This Cane curriculum includes: offensive strikes, joint locks, sweeps, and traps, along with defenses against kicks, punches, bear hugs, and grabs. The cane's flexible techniques allow for easy application from almost any situation, defend against, and submit almost any attacker. The reason for this is the cane's ease of transition from a simple walking stick to a weapon since it is generally about three feet in length.

=== Dan Bong ===
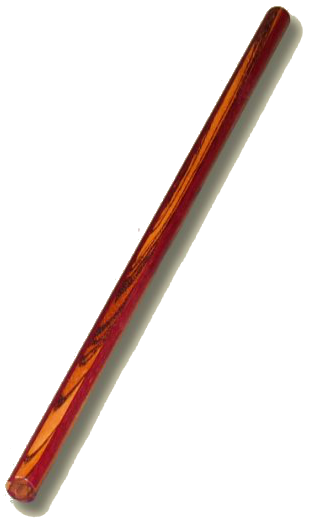
short stick similar to those used in Combat Hapkido

The Dan Bong (Short Stick) is a Self-Defense tool measuring 8 to 12 inches in length and approximately 1 to 1.5 inches in diameter. It carries none of the visual shock value that a baseball bat would, and it is not wielded with any kind of "flashy" movements. The Dan Bong's use is in the application and reinforcement of joint lock, pressure point, choking, and striking techniques. Combat Hapkido master instructors specializing in the Dan Bong have developed their version of the use of the Dan Bong for what they feel is need for modern self-defense needs. The Dan Bong's small size allows for easy carrying and concealment from a potential attacker and an effective means of stealth armament. The Dan Bong can be used in short range attacks and is as is stated above primarily for inflicting more severe pain to an already painful joint lock or pressure point.

=== Weapons disarming ===
In today's social climate with the prevalence of handguns and other weapons on the rise, one of the most important components of Combat Hapkido is its 'Weapon Disarming' techniques. These involve close quarters combat where footwork and bridging the gap are used to achieve superior positioning and leverage to gain control of the weapon or the weapon's carrying arm, and then to disarm the attacker. Because of the effectiveness of these techniques, the ICHF has been invited by many foreign and domestic police organization along with invitations from the United States Military to train both U.S. and Coalition troops in Afghanistan and Iraq.

== Combat Hapkido Grandmasters (8th Dan+) ==
- John Pellegrini, Founder 10th Degree Black Belt
- Michael Emmanuel, Texas 9th Degree Black Belt
- Ivan Jadric, California 9th Degree Black Belt
- Ari Laine, Finland 9th Degree Black Belt
- Alfred Medina, New York 9th Degree Black Belt
- Michael P Rowe, Nebraska 9th Degree Black Belt - Director Adaptive Weapons Program
- Eric Deveau, Illinois 8th Degree Black Belt
- Dan Dorton, North Carolina 8th Degree Black Belt
- Robert Gray, New York 8th Degree Black Belt
- Mark Gridley, Illinois 8th Degree Black Belt - Director Tactical Pressure Points Program
- James Hartigan, New York 8th Degree Black Belt
- David Rivas, Arizona 8th Degree Black Belt - Director Ground Survival Program
- John Scali, Virginia 8th Degree Black Belt
