= Canadian Black Belt Hall of Fame =

The Canadian Black Belt Hall of Fame (CBBHoF) was established in 2006 by martial artists Don Warrener and Wally Slocki with the mission to recognize the contributions of martial art pioneers in Canada.

== Inductees ==
=== 2014 ===
- Mo Chow

=== 2026 ===
- Stan Peterec
- Bob Mueller
