= Peter Urban (karate) =

American Karateka

- Born: August 14, 1934; Jersey City, New Jersey, United States
- Died: April 7, 2004 (aged 69); Massachusetts, United States
- Style: Gōjū-ryū Father of American Goju Karate
- Teachers: Richard Kim, Gogen Yamaguchi, Masutatsu Oyama
- Rank: 6th Dan Japanese Gōjū-ryū Karate; 10th Dan Founder of American Gōjū-ryū Karate

Peter George Urban (August 14, 1934 – April 7, 2004) was an American martial artist. Called "The George Washington of American Karate" by Kick Illustrated magazine, and "The Godfather of American Goju" by Official Karate magazine. Urban was the founder of the karate style known as American GōJū Ryū Karate Do (USA GoJu Karate). He was one of only a small number of white students under Gōgen Yamaguchi, an early Japanese GōJū Ryū practitioner and instructor as well as the head of the style's organization, the Gōjū-Kai. Controversially, Urban created an American style of Gōjū-ryū without the permission of Yamaguchi who would not allow Urban to represent Japanese Karate in America as head representative for the Goju-Kai.

== Early life ==
Urban was born in Jersey City Medical Center in Jersey City, New Jersey, on August 14, 1934. He lived a short while in Altoona, Pennsylvania, then was raised and educated in Union City, New Jersey. He graduated from Emerson High School in Union City in 1952 and thereafter joined the United States Navy.

== US Navy duty in Japan ==
Urban began studying the martial arts while serving in the US Navy in Yokohama, Japan. He apprenticed with Richard Kim in 1953 and became his Uchideshi (house student). He was transferred to Tokyo in 1954 to continue his training with Kim, who introduced Urban to teachers Masutatsu Oyama, founder of the Kyokushin Kai and Gogen Yamaguchi, founder of Zen Nippon GoJu Kai. In 1954, Yamaguchi accepted Urban as his student. Urban trained with Oyama in 1955. When he left Japan in 1959 he had advanced to 5th degree black belt, which was granted by Yamaguchi.

== Return to the US ==
In 1959, Urban returned to America and introduced Gōju-Ryū to the east coast of U.S. He opened his first Gōju-Ryū dojo on 14th Street and Summit Avenue in Union City, N.J. The following year he shared a school in Manhattan which was owned and operated by the Lephofker brothers before moving his classes to 20 E. 17th street in NYC. By 1964, Urban relocated to downtown locations in NYC's Chinatown; Canal Street, Crosby Street, Wooster Street and Williams Street in the Financial District, respectively. Urban was also responsible for establishing structured tournaments with the use of a point system in America. The first of these was the 1st North American Karate Championships held at Madison Square Garden in 1962.

== 1966 visit to Japan ==
In 1966, Urban traveled back to Japan to seek Yamaguchi's consent to create an official Gōjū-ryu club in America and planned to remain for several years hoping to obtain higher rank. Yamaguchi refused his request and the relationship between the men fell apart. Urban returned to San Francisco and spent time training with Richard Kim; who promoted Urban to 6th degree black belt.

in 1967, Peter Urban published a book, The Karate Dojo: Traditions and Tales of a Martial Art, and by the beginning of the following year he would incorporate as, "Peter Urban Karate Inc." and would establish "USA GoJu Karate," as his DBA.

== Awards ==
Urban received several awards, including Black Belt Magazines 2003 Hall of Fame Man of the Year.
