= Bokuyōkan =

Japanese martial art school

Bokuyōkan Daitō-ryū aiki-jūjutsu (牧羊館大東流合気柔術)
- Family crest of the Takeda clan.
- Date founded: c.1995
- Country of origin: Japan
- Founder: Katsumi Yonezawa (米沢 克巳 Yonezawa Katsumi, May 6, 1937–November 27, 1998)
- Current head: Hiromitsu Yonezawa
- Arts taught: Aiki-jūjutsu
- Ancestor schools: Daitō-ryū Kōdōkai

Bokuyōkan (牧羊館), a school of Daitō-ryū Aiki-jūjutsu, is a Japanese martial art founded by Katsumi Yonezawa (1937–1998). This school descends from the school of jujutsu founded by Takeda Sokaku. One of Sokaku's senior students, Horikawa Kodo (1894–1980), founded the Kōdōkai school of Daitō-ryū in 1950 in Kitami, Hokkaidō. After receiving a 7th dan grading through the Kōdōkai and acting as one of the organization's senior teachers, Katsumi Yonezawa founded his own organization, the Bokuyōkan. This organization is currently headed by his son, Hiromitsu Yonezawa.

== Founder ==
Katsumi Yonezawa founded his own Daitō-ryū organization, the Bokuyōkan in Muroran, Hokkaidō, and was one of the first teachers to bring Daitō-ryū Aiki-jūjutsu to Mexico, the USA and Canada while still a senior teacher at the Kōdōkai.

== Affiliated Schools ==
The Bokuyōkan is currently run by his son Hiromitsu Yonezawa from Hokkaidō with a following at the Yonezawa dojo and additional branch dojos in the USA. An additional branch of Bokuyōkan is in Germany at Shinki Dojo.

== Controversy ==
While teaching abroad, in North America, Yonezawa awarded a considerable number of Hiden Mokuroku scrolls denoting mastery of the first level of Daitō-ryū's curriculum. Due to this and other philosophical differences, Yonezawa decided to form his own organization, independent of the Kōdōkai.
