= Yoshihide Fujiwara =

Japanese manga artist (born 1966)

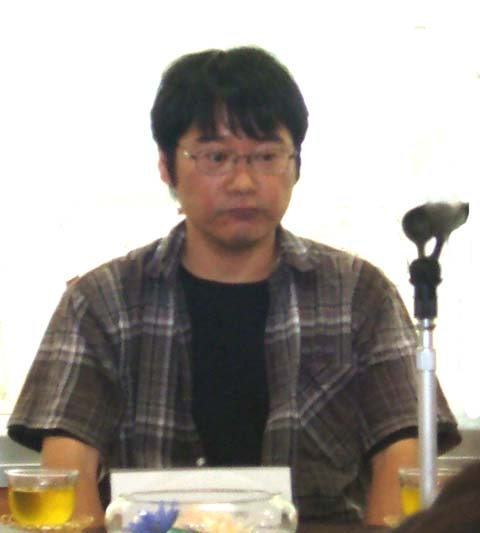
- Born: June 13, 1966; Tottori Prefecture, Japan
- Occupation: Manga artist
- Awards: 1984 Shogakukan New Artist Award (Maris)

Yoshihide Fujiwara (藤原芳秀, Fujiwara Yoshihide; born June 13, 1966 in Tottori Prefecture, Japan) is a Japanese manga artist. Fujiwara first came to attention after winning the 1984 Shogakukan New Artist Award for Maris. He worked as Ryoichi Ikegami's assistant until 1986, and his artistic style closely resembles that of his master.

In 1986 he made his formal debut with Shiritsu Shuuten Koukou.

== Works ==
- Shiritsu Shuuten Koukou (私立終点高校) (written by Kōichi Kitamura)
- Kenji (拳児) (written by Matsuda Ryuchi)
- Jesus (ジーザス) (written by Kyoichi Nanatsuki)
- Virtua Fighter (バーチャファイター) (written by Kyoichi Nanatsuki)
- Conde Koma (コンデ・コマ) (written by Kichiro Nabeta)
- Yami no Aegis (闇のイージス) (written by Kyoichi Nanatsuki)
- BUGS: Summer of Predators (BUGS -捕食者たちの夏-) (written by Kyoichi Nanatsuki)
- Live A Live (character designer, "Imperial China" chapter)
