= Shōrinji-ryū =

Form of karate

Shōrinji-ryū (少林寺流) (translation: Shaolin Temple Family/Style) describes several distinct yet related lineages of karate that carry on the teachings of Okinawan Te masters influenced by Chinese martial arts. These lineages all descend from Kanga “Tode” Sakugawa, who studied directly under Chinese martial artist Kūsankū while in Okinawa, and also studied under Chinese martial artists while traveling in China. Most Shōrinji-ryū styles trace their more recent roots to masters such as Chōtoku Kyan or Kentsū Yabu, who each practiced both Shuri-te (which traditionally traces back to the Quanfa masters Kūsankū, Ason, Iwah, Wang Chung Yo, and Wang Ji) and Tomari-te (which traditionally traces back to Quanfa masters Annan and Ason). This suggests that naming the style Shōrinji-ryū was an attempt to recombine disparate lines of Te, and honor Shaolin roots. Shorinji-ryu practitioners study dozens of Kata that are often associated with various lineages/styles of Okinawan Te and Japanese Budo, including Naihanchi (Shuri-te/Tomari-te), Wanshū (Tomari-te), Chintō (Tomari-te), Seisan (Naha-te/Shuri-te), Kūsankū (Shuri-te), Patsai (Shuri-te/Tomari-te), Lohai (Tomari-te), Ananku (Shorin-ryu with Chinese influence) and Gojūshiho (Shuri-te). Though it shares similarities in naming and some relationships in history and technique, Shorinji-Ryu is distinct from Shorin-Ryu and Shorinji Kempo (founded in 1947 by Doshin So, who shares a common training ancestry with Richard Kim to Takeda Sōkaku). However, several groups—mostly related to Chōtoku Kyan—used Shōrin-ryū and Shōrinji-ryū interchangeably before their organizational identities became standardized after the 1950’s. Well known practitioners (and the organizations they founded in the post-World War II years) include Kori Hisataka (Shōrinjiryū Kenkōkan Karate, 1947), Soke Isamu Tamotsu (Shorinjiryu Karate-do Renshinkan, 1955), Joen Nakazato (Okinawan Shorinji Ryu, 1955), and Richard Kim (the Zen Bei Butoku Kai was founded in the US in 1959, though he taught Shōrinji-ryū in Japan years earlier).
