= Chang Gedo =

Chang Gedo (born 1941), is an early Hapkido practitioner and master of the art, who brought his style of this Korean fighting system to the west in 1973.

== Life ==
Chang Gedo lived until his early twenties in a mountain monastery in Chungnam Province, learning hoshinsul (self-defence techniques) from his father a Buddhist monk. Upon leaving the monastery, Chang Gedo became one of the few men formally recognised as a master of Hapkido (1964) within Ji Han Jae's newly formed association. He then opened his school in Korea and called it Wol Ge Kwan which means The Victor's Laurel. In 1973, Master Chang turned his Hapkido school in Korea over to Choi Yong Sul when the Korean Hapkido Association dispatched him to the United States of America. He has demonstrated and taught throughout the USA, finally settling in Lombard, Illinois where he opened his first U.S. School, Chang's Hapkido Academy. Chang’s Hapkido Academy has schools across America and expanded to England in 1993 under Tammy Parlour.

== Accomplishments ==
He was the first to develop Hapkido techniques specifically for police personnel. His teaching abilities so impressed the Korean Government, that they created a special award for Best Martial Arts Instructor, and presented it to Master Chang. Chang Gedo is an 8th degree master of Hapkido and president of the World Hapkido Union; he is also an author of many books and a world-renowned speaker on Ki, spirituality and human behaviour.
