= Wally Slocki =

Canadian martial artist

- Born: Walter Slocki; March 7, 1947 (age 79); Toronto, Ontario, Canada
- Height: 6 ft 0 in (1.83 m)
- Weight: 195 lb (88 kg; 13.9 st)
- Stance: Orthodox

Walter "Wally" Slocki (born March 7, 1947) is a Canadian martial artist who was the 1967, 1968, and 1970 Canadian National Champion.

Slocki began training in 1953 at the age of 6. He is a ninth degree black belt in karate and has trained aikido, jiu-jitsu, judo, taekwondo and kung-fu.

In recent years, he has worked for Paragon Security in Toronto as a Management Director. In 2022, he was inducted into the Brampton Sports Hall of Fame.
