= Daitō-ryū Aiki-jūjutsu =

Japanese martial art

Daitō-ryū Aiki-jūjutsu (大東流 合気柔術)
- Family crest of the Takeda clan.
- Also known as: Daitō-ryū; Daitō-ryū Jujutsu
- Date founded: c. 780–1200
- Country of origin: Japan
- Founder: Minamoto no Yoshimitsu (武田 惣角 Takeda Sōkaku was the restorer, October 10, 1859–April 25, 1943)
- Current head: Multiple independent branches
- Arts taught: Aiki-jūjutsu
- Descendant arts: (see below)

Daitō-ryū Aiki-jūjutsu (大東流 合気柔術), originally called Daitō-ryū Jujutsu (大東流柔術, Daitō-ryū Jūjutsu), is a Japanese martial art that first became widely known in the early 20th century under the headmastership of Takeda Sōkaku. Takeda had extensive training in several martial arts (including Kashima Shinden Jikishinkage-ryū and supposedly Sumo) and referred to the style he taught as "Daitō-ryū" (literally, "Great Eastern School"). Although the school's traditions claim to extend back centuries in Japanese history there are no known extant records regarding the ryū before Takeda. Whether Takeda is regarded as either the restorer or the founder of the art, the known history of Daitō-ryū begins with him. Takeda's best-known student was Morihei Ueshiba, the founder of Aikido.

== History ==
Daitō-ryū (also known as simply Aiki-jūjutsu) is mostly considered to be a fighting style created by the Seiwa Minamoto clan, and handed down from generation to generation. It was Shinra Saburo Minamoto Yoshimitsu the one who compiled all its teachings around the 11th century. Shinra Saburō Minamoto no Yoshimitsu (新羅 三郎 源 義光, 1045–1127) was a Minamoto clan samurai and member of the Seiwa Genji (the branch of the Minamoto family descended from the 56th imperial ruler of Japan, Emperor Seiwa). Yoshimitsu studied and researched the techniques handed down in his family in more detail. It is also believed that Yoshimitsu dissected the corpses of men killed in battle, studying their anatomy for the purpose of learning techniques for joint-locking and atemi-waza (nerve striking). Daitō-ryū takes its name from the mansion that Yoshimitsu lived in as a child, called "Daitō" (大東), in Ōmi Province (modern day Shiga Prefecture).

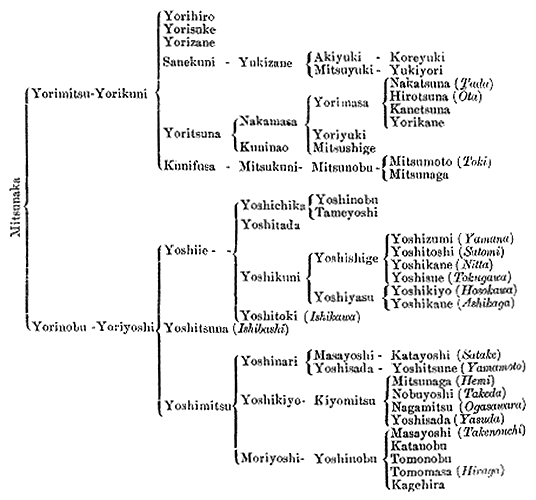
Family tree of the Seiwa Genji

Yoshimitsu eventually settled down in Kai Province (modern day Yamanashi Prefecture), and passed on what he learned within his family. Ultimately, Yoshimitsu's great-grandson Nobuyoshi adopted the surname "Takeda", which has been the name of the family to the present day. The Takeda family remained in Kai Province until the time of Takeda Shingen (武田 信玄, 1521–1573). Shingen opposed Tokugawa Ieyasu and Oda Nobunaga in their campaign to unify and control all of Japan. With the death of Shingen and his heir, Takeda Katsuyori (武田 勝頼, 1546–1582), the Takeda family relocated to the Aizu domain (an area comprising the western third of modern-day Fukushima Prefecture).

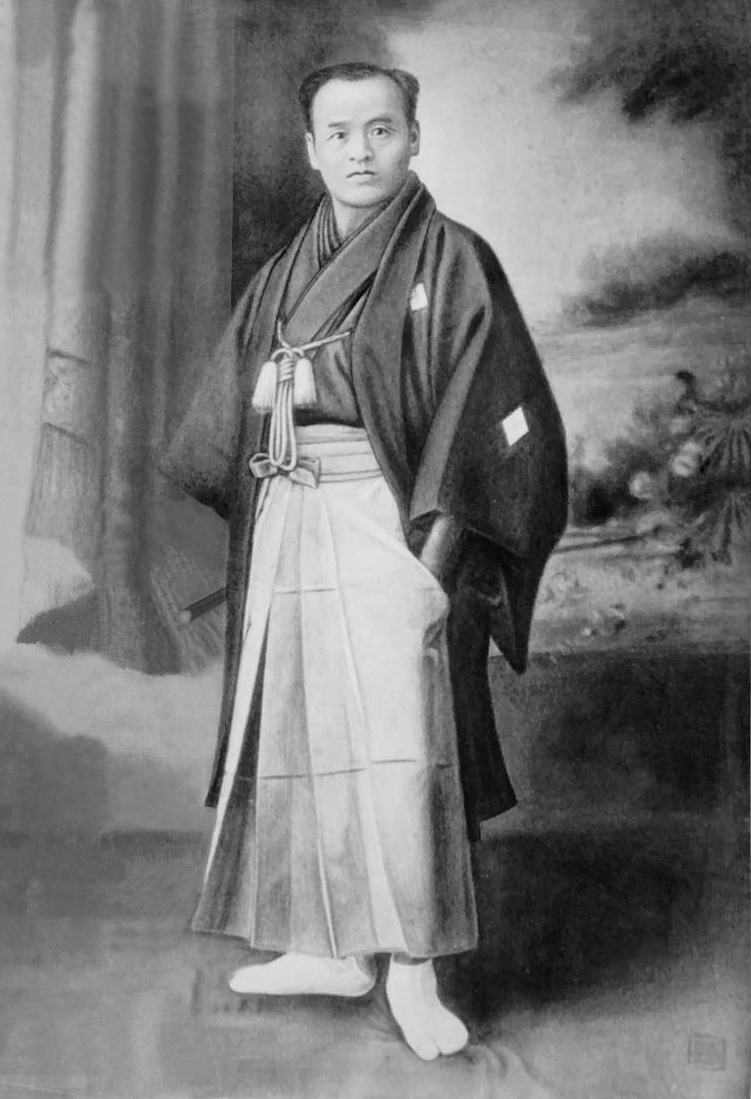
Retouched photograph of Takeda Sokaku, c. 1888

Though these events caused the Takeda family to lose some of its power and influence, it remained intertwined with the ruling class of Japan. More importantly, the move to Aizu and subsequent events profoundly shaped what would emerge as Daitō-ryū Aiki-jūjutsu in the 19th century. One important event was the adoption of Tokugawa Ieyasu's grandson, Komatsumaru (1611–1673), by Takeda Kenshoin (fourth daughter of Takeda Shingen). Komatsumaru devoted himself to the study of the Takeda family's martial arts, and was subsequently adopted by Hoshina Masamitsu. Komatsumaru changed his name to Hoshina Masayuki (保科 正之), and in 1644 was appointed the governor of Aizu. As governor, he mandated that all subsequent rulers of Aizu study the arts of Ono-ha Ittō-ryū (which he himself had mastered), as well as the art of oshikiuchi, a martial art which he developed for shogunal counselors and retainers, tailored to conditions within the palace. These arts became incorporated into and combined with the Takeda family martial arts.

According to the traditions of Daitō-ryū, it was these arts which Takeda Sokaku began teaching to non-members of the family in the late 19th century. Takeda had also studied swordsmanship and spearmanship with his father, Takeda Sokichi, as well as Kashima Shinden Jikishinkage-ryū as an uchi-deshi (live-in student) under the renowned swordsman Sakakibara Kenkichi. During his life, Sokaku traveled extensively to attain his goal of preserving his family's traditions by spreading Daitō-ryū throughout Japan.

Takeda Sokaku's third son, Tokimune Takeda (武田 時宗 Takeda Tokimune, 1916–1993), became the headmaster of the art following Sokaku's death in 1943. Tokimune taught what he called "Daitō-ryū Aikibudō" (大東流合気武道), an art that included the sword techniques of the Ono-ha Ittō-ryū along with the traditional techniques of Daitō-ryū Aiki-jūjutsu. It was also under Tokimune's headmastership that modern dan rankings were first created and awarded to the students of Daitō-ryū. Tokimune Takeda died in 1993 leaving no official successor, but a few of his high-ranking students, such as Katsuyuki Kondo (近藤 勝之 Kondō Katsuyuki, 1945–) and Shigemitsu Kato, now head their own Daitō-ryū Aiki-jūjutsu organizations.

== Aiki-jūjutsu ==
Aiki-jūjutsu can be broken into three styles: jujutsu (hard); aiki no jutsu (soft); and the combined aikijujutsu (hard/soft). Modern aikido originated in aikijujutsu, which emphasizes "an early neutralization of an attack". Like other forms of jujutsu, it emphasizes throwing techniques and joint manipulations to effectively subdue or injure an attacker. Of particular importance is the timing of a defensive technique either to blend or to neutralize an attack's effectiveness and to use the force of the attacker's movement against him. Daitō-ryū is characterized by ample use of atemi, or the striking of vital areas, to set up jointlocking or throwing tactics.

Some of the art's striking methods employ the swinging of the outstretched arms to create power and to hit with the fists at deceptive angles, as may be observed in techniques such as the atemi that sets up gyaku ude-dori (reverse elbow lock). Tokimune Takeda regarded one of the unique characteristics of the art to be its preference for controlling a downed attacker's joints with one's knee to leave one's hands free to access weapons or to deal with the threat of other attackers.

== Branches ==
Currently, there are a number of organizations that teach Daitō-ryū, each tracing their lineage back to Takeda Sokaku through one of six of his students. Those six students are: Takeda Tokimune, the progenitor of the Tokimune branch; Takuma Hisa (久 琢磨 Hisa Takuma, 1895–1980), of the Hisa branch; Kōdō Horikawa (堀川 幸道 Horikawa Kōdō, 1894–1980), of the Horikawa branch; Toshimi ‘Hosaku’ Matsuda (1895 - ?) kyoju-dairi 教授代理 of the Daito Ryu Aikijujutsu Shobukai; Yukiyoshi Sagawa (Sagawa Yukiyoshi, 1902–1998), of the Sagawa branch, and Somekichi Kobayashi (1901–1999), of the Kobayashi branch.

=== Tokimune ===
The Tokimune branch descends from the teachings of Takeda Tokimune, the son of Takeda Sokaku, and designated successor of Daitō-ryū upon the father's death. When Tokimune died, he had not appointed a successor; there are two main groups that carry on his teachings.

The first group is led by Katsuyuki Kondō, who began his training under Tsunejiro Hosono and continued training under Kōtarō Yoshida (吉田 幸太郎 Yoshida Kōtarō, 1883–1966) for a time, before being introduced to Tokimune. On the basis of the high level teaching licenses Kondo was granted by Tokimune, his followers represent his school as the Daitō-ryū "mainline". Kondo has done much to increase the visibility of the art by hosting seminars both in Tokyo and abroad, especially in Europe and the United States. In the last years many Branches were created all over the world. The biggest groups are located in Italy (under Alex Muracchini and Luca Canovi), Russia (under Evgeny Bodrenko and Stanislav Kopin), Netherlands (Robert Breedveld, Niels van Willigen, Anton Barendregt, and Ilse van der Hoeven), Slovakia (under Stephan Kurilla). In the USA there are also several Branch dōjōs such as Derek Steel in Philadelphia, Mark Sumi in Los Angeles and Jose Garrido in the New York City Metro area. In the United Kingdom there is a study group in Suffolk (under Oran Redmond). Australia study group is led by Rachael Crompton in Sidney. Switzerland’s study groups are led by Pascal Badan (Lausanne) and Selahattin Ak (Zürich).

The second group from the Tokimune branch is headed by Shigemitsu Kato and Gunpachi Arisawa, who are long-time students and teachers from Tokimune's original Daitokan headquarters in Hokkaidō. This organization is called the Nihon Daito Ryu Aikibudo Daito Kai (日本大東流合気武道大東会, Nihon Daitō-ryū Aikibudō Daitō Kai). They maintain a smaller organization in Hokkaidō, with strong connections to practitioners in Europe (especially Italy), the United States, and Brazil.

=== Hisa ===
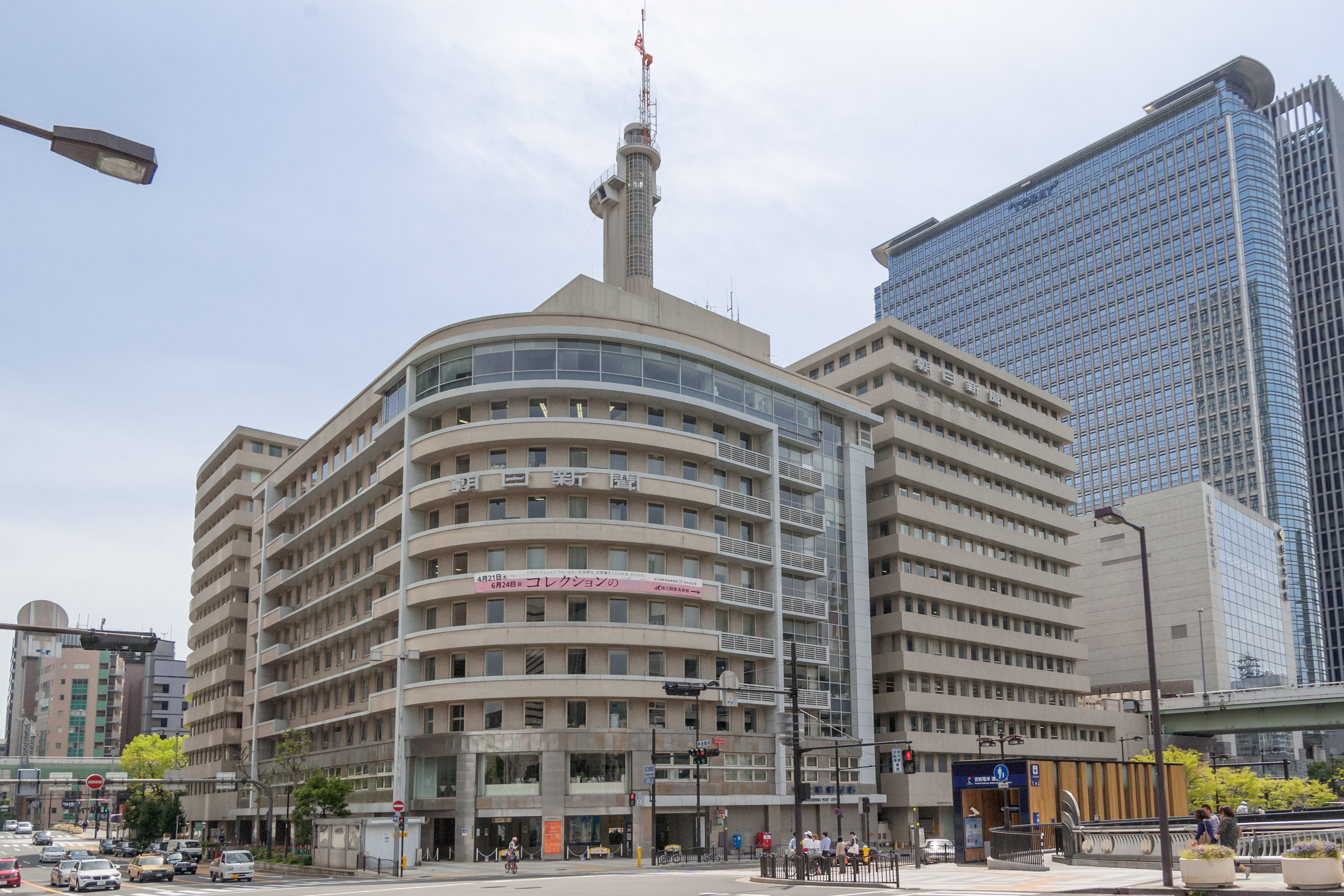
The Asahi Newspaper office in Osaka, Japan, where many Daitō-ryū techniques were preserved on film as originally taught by both Morihei Ueshiba and Takeda Sōkaku

The second major branch of Daitō-ryū is represented by students of Takuma Hisa. His students banded together and founded the Takumakai (琢磨会). They have a wealth of materials in the form of film and still photographs, taken at the Asahi Newspaper dōjō, recording the Daitō-ryū techniques taught to them, first by Morihei Ueshiba and then later by Takeda Sokaku directly. One of their major training manuals, called the Sōden, features techniques taught to them by both masters.

The Takumakai represents the second largest aiki-jūjutsu organization. The current director is Mori Hakaru assisted by honorary director is Chiba Tsugutaka, and the manager is Kobayashi Kiyohiro. Chiba Tsugutaka, who proposed the idea of naming the organization "Takumakai", also spent some time training at the Daito-kan in Hokkaido under Takeda Tokimune.

In the 1980s, led by Shogen Okabayashi (Okabayashi Shogen, born 1949-2018), who was sent by the elderly Hisa to train under the headmaster, the Takumakai made a move to implement the forms for teaching the fundamentals of the art as originally established by Tokimune Takeda. This move upset some preservers of Hisa's original teaching method, leading to the formation of a new organization called the Daibukan, founded by a long term student of Hisa, Kenkichi Ohgami (Ōgami Kenkichi, born 1936). Later, in order to implement greater changes to the curriculum, Okabayashi himself chose to separate from the Takumakai and formed the Hakuho-ryu.

=== Horikawa ===
The Horikawa branch descends from the teachings of Kōdō Horikawa. A few organizations have been formed based on his teachings.

The Kodokai (幸道会, Kōdōkai) was founded by students of Horikawa, whose distinctive interpretation of aiki movements can be seen in the movements of his students. The Kodokai is located in Hokkaidō and is headed by Yusuke Inoue (Inoue Yasuke, born 1932). Both Inoue's father and his main teacher, Horikawa, were direct students of Takeda Sokaku. Inoue received his teaching license (Menkyo Kaiden) in accordance with Horikawa's final wishes.

There are two major teachers who branched off from the Kodokai to establish their own traditions. The first was Seigō Okamoto (岡本 正剛 Okamoto Seigō, 1925-2015) who founded the Daito-ryu Aikijujutsu Roppokai (大東流 合気柔術 六方会, Daitō-ryū Aiki-jūjutsu Roppōkai). His interpretation of aiki and minimal movement throws. The organization has a great following abroad, especially in the United States and Europe. Another group was that of Katsumi Yonezawa (米沢 克巳 Yonezawa Katsumi, 1937–1998), who founded his own organization, called the Bokuyōkan (牧羊館). In the early 1970s, while Yonezawa was still a senior teacher at the Kodokai, he was the first person to bring Daitō-ryū Aiki-jūjutsu to the United States and Canada. The Bokuyōkan is currently run by his son Hiromitsu Yonezawa (Yonezawa Hiromitsu), headquartered in Hokkaidō, with a following at the Yonezawa dojo and several branches in the United States, as well as a dojo in Germany.

=== Sagawa ===
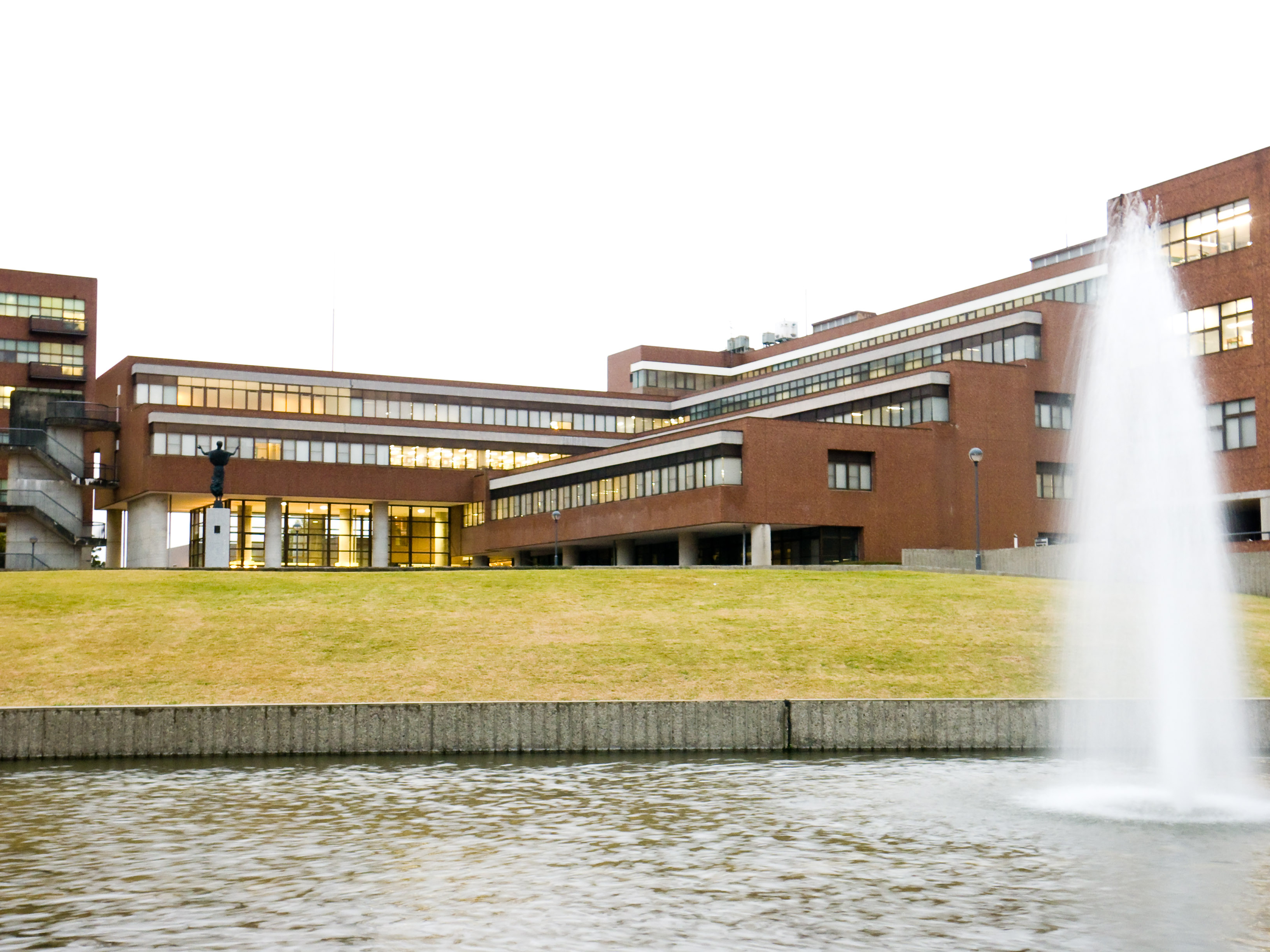
The University of Tsukuba, where members of the Sagawa branch teach aiki-jūjutsu today

The last major group consists of students of Yukiyoshi Sagawa (佐川 幸義, Sagawa Yukiyoshi, 1902–1998), who was once considered to be the successor to Takeda Sokaku (should Tokimune not have survived World War II). Sagawa ran only a single dojo and taught a relatively small number of students. He began studying Daitō-ryū under Takeda Sokaku in 1914 after first learning the art from his father, Sagawa Nenokichi (1867–1950), who was also a student of Sokaku and a holder of a Kyōju Dairi (teaching license) in the system. Although considered by many to be one of the most accomplished students of Sokaku, Yukiyoshi Sagawa received the kyoju dairi in 1932—but did not receive the menkyo kaiden (certificate of mastery) of the system's secrets, as during the time he practised under Takeda Sokaku, the highest licence was not the menkyo kaiden. Sagawa often served as a teaching assistant to Takeda and traveled with him to various locations in Japan teaching Daito-ryu. He further developed the art of applying Aiki and is said to have remained powerful until very late in life, and – as a consequence of the success of Transparent Power – was featured in a series of articles in the Aiki News magazines prior to his death in 1998.

Tatsuo Kimura (木村 達雄 Kimura Tatsuo, born 1947), a former mathematics professor at the University of Tsukuba and a senior student of Sagawa, ran a small aiki-jūjutsu study group at that institution. He retired from his professorship there in June 2013, and has retired from public instruction of Daito Ryu. He now privately instructs a small group of students. He has written two books about his training under Sagawa: Transparent Power and Discovering Aiki.

== Aiki concept ==
Takeda Sokaku defined aiki in the following way:

"The secret of aiki is to overpower the opponent mentally at a glance and to win without fighting."

Tokimune Takeda, speaking on the same subject during an interview explained in more detail about the concept of aiki:

Aiki is to pull when you are pushed, and to push when you are pulled. It is the spirit of slowness and speed, of harmonizing your movement with your opponent's ki. Its opposite, kiai, is to push to the limit, while aiki never resists. The term aiki has been used since ancient times and is not unique to Daito-ryu. The ki in aiki is go no sen, meaning to respond to an attack.

... Daito-ryu is all go no sen — you first evade your opponent's attack and then strike or control him. Likewise, Ittō-ryū is primarily go no sen. You attack because an opponent attacks you. This implies not cutting your opponent. This is called katsujinken (life-giving sword). Its opposite is called setsuninken (death-dealing sword).

Aiki is different from the victory of sen sen, and is applied in situations of go no sen, such as when an opponent thrusts at you. Therein lies the essence of katsujinken and setsuninken. You block the attack when an opponent approaches; at his second attack you break his sword and spare his life. This is katsujinken. When an opponent strikes at you and your sword pierces his stomach it is setsuninken. These two concepts are the essence of the sword.

== Classification of techniques ==
Daitō-ryū techniques involve both jujutsu and aiki-jūjutsu applications. Techniques are broken up into specific lists which are trained sequentially; that is, a student will not progress to the next "catalogue" of techniques until he/she has mastered the previous one. Upon completion of each catalogue, a student is awarded a certificate or scroll that lists all of the techniques of that level. These act as levels of advancement within the school, and was a common system among classical Japanese martial arts schools before the era of belts, grades, and degrees.

The first category of techniques in the system, the shoden waza, is not devoid of aiki elements, though it emphasizes the more direct jujutsu joint manipulation techniques. The second group of techniques, the aiki-no-jutsu, tends to emphasize the utilization of one's opponent's movement or intention in order to subdue him/her—usually with a throwing or a pinning technique. A list of the catalogues in the Tokimune branch's system and the number of techniques contained within follows:

	Catalogue Name	No. of Techniques
1	Secret Syllabus (秘伝目録, Hiden Mokuroku)	118
2	The Science of Joining Spirit (合気之術, Aiki-no-jutsu)	53
3	Inner Mysteries (秘伝奥義, Hiden Ōgi)	36
4	Techniques of Self Defense (護身用の手, Goshin'yō-no-te)	84
5	Explanation of the Inheritance (解釈相伝, Kaishaku Sōden)	477
6	License of Complete Transmission (Menkyo Kaiden)	88

Officially, the Daitō-ryū system is said to comprise thousands of techniques, divided into omote and ura (literally, 'front' and 'back' versions), but many of these could be seen as variations upon the core techniques. In addition, Sokaku and Tokimune awarded scrolls denoting certain portions of the curriculum, such as techniques utilizing the long and short sword.

To the list above, the Takumakai adds the "Daito-ryu Aiki Nito-ryu Hiden". The Takumakai also makes substantial use of the photographic documents of techniques taught at the Asahi Newspaper dojo by Morihei Ueshiba and Takeda Sokaku, which are compiled into a series of 11 training manuals called the Sōden.

== Influence ==
The significant interest in this martial art, which has much in common with the many less popular classical Japanese jujutsu schools, is probably due largely to the success of Takeda Sokaku's student Morihei Ueshiba, and the art that he founded, aikido. Aikido is practised internationally and has hundreds of thousands of adherents. Many of those interested in aikido have traced the art's origins back to Daitō-ryū, which has increased the level of interest in an art which was otherwise virtually unknown a few decades before.

Aikido's influence was significant even in its early years, prior to World War II, when Ueshiba was teaching a more overtly combative form closer to Daitō-ryū. One of the main conduits of the influence of Ueshiba's pre-war aiki-jūjutsu was Kenji Tomiki, founder of Shodokan Aikido. Tomiki was already ranked 5th dan in judo when he began studying under Ueshiba. Today's goshin jutsu kata, or "forms of self defense" (created in 1956 by a team of experts after Kanō Jigorō's death, and thus not belonging to original judo), preserve these teachings, as does Tomiki's own organization of Shodokan Aikido.

=== Related arts ===
The concept of aiki is an old one, and was common to other classical Japanese schools of armed combat. There are some other styles of Japanese jujutsu that use the term aiki-jūjutsu, but there are no records of its use prior to the Meiji era. Many modern schools influenced by aikido presently utilize the term to describe their use of aikido-like techniques with a more combative mindset.

There are a number of martial arts in addition to aikido which appear, or claim, to be descended from the art of Daitō-ryū or the teachings of Takeda Sōkaku. Among them are: the Korean martial art of hapkido founded by Choi Yong-sool, who claims to have been trained under Takeda Sokaku; Choi gave two versions of his story, one in 1962 and another completely different one in 1982. Hakkō-ryū founded by Okuyama Yoshiharu, who trained under Takeda Sokaku; and Shorinji Kempo, founded by Nakano Michiomi (later known as So Doshin), who is known to have trained under Okuyama. Additionally, Icho-ryū – an offshoot designed for police defense is practiced widely in Washington state. Many techniques from Hakko-ryu are similar to the techniques of Daitō-ryu. Certain styles of Karate also use joint manipulation and locking techniques.

=== Schools and derivative arts ===
- Aikido
- Hontai Hakkei Ryu Aikijujutsu
- Yoseikan Budō
- Hakkō-ryū
- Hakkō Denshin-ryū
- Yanagi-ryū Aiki Bugei
- Hapki yusul
- Hapkido
- Combat Hapkido
- Hwa Rang Do
- Jishukan Ryu
- Fudoshin-ryu

== Notable practitioners ==
- Masao Tonedate
- Takuma Hisa
- Takeda Tokimune
- Morihei Ueshiba
- Kōtarō Yoshida
- Kodo Horikawa
- Toshimi Matsuda
- Yukiyoshi Sagawa
- Choi Yong-Sool
- Yonezawa Katsumi
- Tung Tianchao

== See also ==
- Japanese martial arts
