= Takeda Sōkaku =

Japanese martial artist (1859–1943)

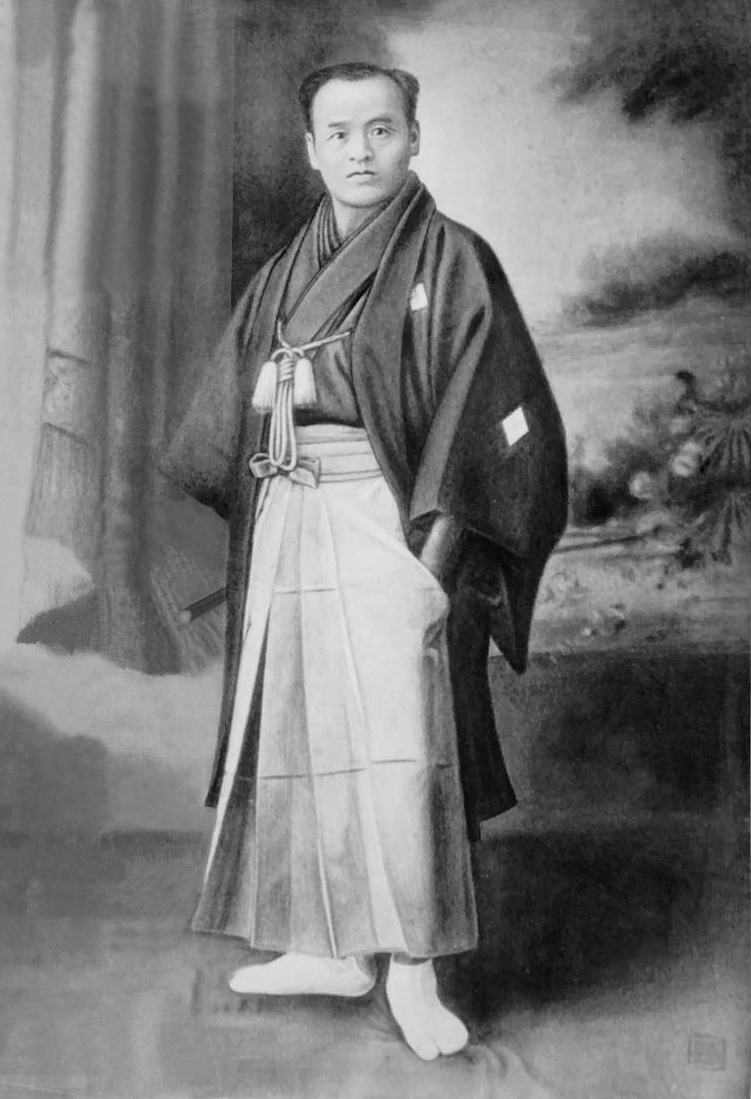
- Retouched photograph of Takeda Sōkaku circa 1888
- Born: October 10, 1859; Aizu, Fukushima, Japan
- Died: April 25, 1943 (aged 83); Japan
- Native name: 武田 惣角 源正義
- Nationality: Japanese
- Style: Daitō-ryū Aiki-jūjutsu
- Teachers: Saigō Tanomo, Toma Shibuya, Sakakibara Kenkichi

Other information
- Occupation: Japanese Scholar, Martial artist
- Children: Takeda Tokimune
- Notable students: Morihei Ueshiba, Hisa Takuma, Kōtarō Yoshida, Choi Yong-sool, Okuyama Ryuho

Takeda Sōkaku (武田 惣角; October 10, 1859 – April 25, 1943) was known as the founder of a school of jujutsu known as Daitō-ryū Aiki-jūjutsu. His nickname was The Little Tengu of Aizu and he was known as Minamoto no Masayoshi (源正義).

== Life ==
Born in the Aizu domain (Fukushima Prefecture), Sōkaku grew up in the time of the Boshin War. The second son of Takeda Sōkichi, a samurai of the Takeda clan who worked his farm and taught at a local school in a Buddhist temple. His mother, Tomi Kurokochi, was a daughter of Dengoro Kurokochi, a Yari and Kenjutsu master. It is believed that Sōkaku received his first martial arts training from his father who had a dojo on their property. Sōkichi was apparently expert in the use of both sword and spear, and had once been a sumo wrestler of ozeki rank (this claim is likely apocryphal, as no matching rikishi can be found in period records). It is believed that Sōkaku was exposed to the teachings of Hōzōin-ryū Takada-ha and Ono-ha Ittō-ryū, schools of spear and swordsmanship respectively.

Sōkaku then left to go on a period of austere training where he travelled, fought and trained at the schools of many teachers, a not uncommon practise of the time. Reputedly, Sōkaku spent some time as a live-in student of Kenkichi Sakakibara, headmaster of the Jikishinkage-ryū and considered to be one of the most famous and skilled swordsmen of the era. Unfortunately there exist no known historical documents to confirm this relationship and so it is a matter of debate. What is known, however, is that Sōkaku engaged in many matches and duels with both shinai and live blades and was considered a swordsman of great skill in a period of time when such things were beginning to be forgotten.

With the outlawing of the samurai class and the prohibition against carrying swords (Haitōrei Edict) apparentally Sokaku decided to emphasize the empty handed, jujutsu oriented, techniques of his ancestor's art. These apparently were 'oshiki-uchi', or secret teachings of the Aizu clan, up to that point. These, along with other skills he had acquired, were combined to create an art which he named first 'Daitō-ryū jūjutsu' and later 'Daitō-ryū Aiki-jūjutsu'.

In about 1875, rumor reached Sōkaku that Saigō Takamori had launched his rebellion in Satsuma against the forces of the new Meiji government. He decided immediately that he would go to lend his support. He made it as far as Kyushu but was unable to reach his destination, so he returned to Osaka where he spent the next ten years as a guest in the Kyōshin Meichi-ryū dojo of swordsman Momonoi Shunzō.

Sōkaku lived a somewhat itinerant life, travelling the length and breadth of the country giving seminars in martial arts to military officers, police officers and martial arts enthusiasts, often of high social standing. He left extensive records of those he taught in his eimeiroku and shareikoku - attendance and fee ledgers.

== Important students ==
Taking over the role of headmaster of the art was Sōkaku's son, Tokimune Takeda, who established the Daitokan school in Hokkaidō to promote the art and renamed it 'Daitō-ryū Aiki Budō'. Tokimune is said to have contributed much of the teaching system which exists for the art today; naming and classifying the techniques and further simplifying the weapons component of the system. He emphasized the Ona ha Itto-ryu portion of the weapons curriculum over other elements that Sōkaku taught to some advanced students.

Sokaku's highest ranking students were Hisa Takuma and Masao Tonedate, both high executives of the Asahi newspaper in Osaka, whose own students established the Takumakai and the Daibukan.

Other important students of Sōkaku's were Yukiyoshi Sagawa, who some believe was the most talented of his early students, Kodo Horikawa (Kotaro), whose students established the Kodokai and the Roppokai, Kōtarō Yoshida, Hosaku Matsuda and Tomekichi Yamamoto.

== Sōkaku's far-reaching influence ==
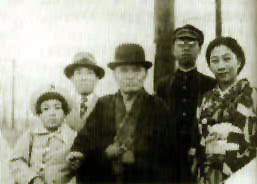
Takeda family

His most famous student was the founder of aikido, Morihei Ueshiba and it is the popularity of this modern martial arts form that is responsible for much of the interest in Daitō-ryū today.

Hosaku Matsuda was taught by Sōkaku, who in turn taught Yoshiji Okuyama, who in turn founded the Hakkō-ryū Jujutsu school. Okuyama taught Michiomi Nakano, who later as Dōshin Sō, founder of Nippon Shorinji Kempo. Choi Yong-Sool, the founder of Hapkido was adopted by Sokaku and trained with him as well.

The influence of the teachings of Sokaku Takeda are readily discernible in the physical techniques of aikido, Hakko Ryu, Nippon Shorinji Kempo, hapkido and judo's goshin jutsu self-defense kata (via Kenji Tomiki) today.
