= Menkyo =

Japanese term

Japanese name
- Kanji: 免許
- Hiragana: めんきょ
Transcriptions
- Revised Hepburn: menkyo

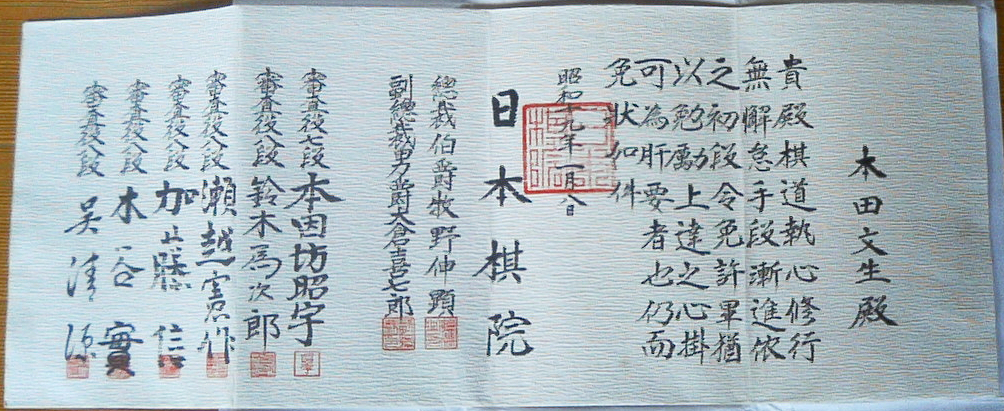
The first dan permission letter on display at the Nippon Kiin

Menkyo (免許) is a Japanese term meaning "license." It refers to the license to teach used by practitioners of various Japanese classical arts and martial arts certifying some license within the school or ryū. The menkyo system dates back to the 8th century.

== Koryū Tradition ==
Although it is most commonly thought to be used for classical martial arts and ways, it can also be used for other arts such as painting (sumi-e), tea ceremony (chadō), flower arranging (Ikebana) or calligraphy (shodō).

Different martial art ko-ryū use different license; one outline is:

- Okuiri : enter into art.
- Mokuroku : certificate, and entered into official rolls.
  - Sho Mokuroku
  - Hatsu Mokuroku
  - Go Mokuroku
- Menkyo: License.
  - Shoden Menkyo
  - Chuden Menkyo
  - Okuden Menkyo
  - Hiden Menkyo
- Menkyo Kaiden: Around thirty years' experience.

== Menkyo Kaiden ==
Menkyo kaiden (免許皆伝), (めんきょかいでん) is a Japanese term meaning "license of total transmission." Kaiden (皆伝) means "initiation into an art or discipline." It is a license that is used by a school or ko-ryū, meaning that the student has learned everything and passed all aspects of his/her training within the ko-ryū.

In the menkyo system of licenses, the menkyo kaiden is the highest level of license that exists under the menkyo system. Advancement of license is not determined by years spent learning, but how well one masters the discipline. However, the transition from menkyo to kaiden require usually at least thirty years' experience. A holder of menkyo kaiden is often, but not always, the de facto successor to the sōke of the koryū.

== See also ==
- The Dan system, the modern ranking system created by Jigoro Kano in 1883 for Kodokan judo.
- Koryu
- Japanese martial arts
