= Kim Yun-sik =

South Korean martial arts instructor

- Born: 1943 (age 82–83); Seoul, South Korea
- Nationality: South Korea
- Style: Hapkido, Taekwondo, Bum Moo Kwan
- Trainer: Choi Yong-sool
- Rank: Grandmaster

Other information
- Occupation: Martial artist
- Notable relatives: Fellows: Kim Yoon-sang, Myung Kwang-sik, Hwang In-shik
- Last updated on: 2010-02-23

Kim Yun-sik (Korean: 김윤식, born 1943) is a South Korean hapkido and taekwondo instructor. He was born in Seoul, Korea in 1943. He is one of the highest ranking hapkido and taekwondo (9th dan) instructors in the world and founder of Bum Moo Kwan Hapkido.

== Trainee ==
He began his martial arts training in 1954 under the direction of Choi Yong-sool (Korean: 최용술), and received the black belt from Grandmaster Choi in 1957.

In the same year he received the black belt in taekwondo from Grandmaster Hwang Kee.

== Hapkido and Taekwondo teacher ==
In 1968 he established his first school in Seoul "Tchon Young", which was one of the first teaching Taekwondo and Hapkido together. In the same year Kim founded the "Bum Moo Kwan Hapkido", becoming its first chairman.

== One of the founders of the new Hapkido era ==
In the 1960s, alongside his master Choi and other masters such as Ji Han-jae, establishes the Korea Hapkido Association, also known as Daehan Hapkido.
Kim holds the 10th dan in Hapkido, 9th dan in Taekwondo by World Taekwondo Federation
Holds the degree number 7 of the Korea Hapkido Federation and number 9 by the Korea Kido Association.

=== The Kwan (Martial arts family) ===
Between the 1950s and 1960s, after the separation of the North and South, the South went under a big and rigorous transformation, the end of the Imperialist power, to the new capitalist system. The new legislation changed the whole country and it included the martial arts. The government regulation for martial arts was rigorous and it demanded the registration of the Kwans (martial arts family). To register a Kwan, the master had to prove he had at least the 7th dan in his martial art and 30 dojangs (the Korean word for the place where martial arts are trained, the same for Japanese dojo).

As for Hapkido, only 3 masters managed to register a "Kwan", here they are.
Original Hapkido Kwan Founders:
Kim, Yun-sik: Hapkido Bum Moo Kwan
Ji, Han-jae: Sung Moo Kwan Hapkido
Kim, Moo-wong: Shin Moo Kwan Hapkido

=== Associations and federations ===
Also, the government issued a decree for the registration of associations, which would be responsible for the organization of the "Kwans". At the time, the master had to first register his "Kwan" in the government and after that in the new association established.

The first to have his association recognized by the government was "Korea Kido Association", having Mr Kim, Du-young as its chairman.

The "Korea Kido Association" was not an association related only to Hapkido and, even today, they have over 30 styles of martial arts related to them. To solve this issue, the masters Ji, Han-jae; Kim, Yun-sik; Kim, Young-jin; Myung, Kwang-sik; Kim, Yong-whan; Lee, Tae-joon and others united to establish the first association to take care exclusively of Hapkido; it was named "Korea Hapkido Association", also known as "Dae Han Hapkido", and Grand Master Ji, Han-jae was elected the first chairman.

The Kwans were only registered until 1970. In 1971 the Korean government issues a decree stating Taekwondo as its national sport.

The only three original Kwans are those stated above, those are the fathers of the modern Hapkido.

== Awards ==
Some of the awards received by Kim Yun-sik for the showcase of his Hapkido Techniques:

- 1972 award for "best demonstration" in the first martial arts meeting, promoted by the "MBC TV network" in Seoul, Korea.
- 1986 award for "best demonstration" in the martial arts meeting in Manaus, Brazil.
- 1994 award for "best demonstration" in the martial arts meeting in Ottawa, Ontario, Canada.

== Bum Moo Kwan Hapkido style ==
Kim stablished the Bum Moo(Tiger) Kwan(Family) Hapkido (Hapkido of the Tiger Family) in 1968.
His style is known as being "simplified, direct".
The practitioner of the Bum Moo style is instructed to finish the fight quickly, using any available material as weapon or any part of his body, aiming the opponent's pressure or vital points.

== Organizations ==
- Chairman of the "World Bum Moo Kwan Hapkido Federation"
- Chairman of the "Confederação Brasileira de Hapkido" (Brazilian Hapkido Federation)
- Chairman of the "Federação Paulista de Hapkido" (São Paulo State Hapkido Federation)
- Former chairman of the "Pró Taekwondo Brasil"
- Former chairman of the "Brazilian Taekwondo Association"
- Former vice-president of the organization committee of the "2nd World Hapkido Championship", held in Seoul, Korea
- Former chairman of the "Korean Association of Taekwondo in Brazil"
- Former chairman of the "Korean Masters Association in Brazil"
