= Kwon Tae-man =

South Korean hapkidoin (born 1941)

- Hangul: 권태만
- RR: Gwon Taeman
- MR: Kwŏn T'aeman

Kwon Tae-man (born 1941) was an early Korean hapkido practitioner and a pioneer of the art, first in Korea and then in the United States. He formed one of the earliest dojang's for hapkido in the United States in Torrance, California, and has been featured in many magazine articles promoting the art.

== Life ==
Kwon was born in Andong in what is now South Korea. His first exposure to the martial arts was at the age of seven, when he began studying taekwondo. During that period of time, following the Korean War, Korea was in a period of rebuilding its physical and cultural landscape. Formal dojangs, had not yet been constructed. Thus, the taekwondo classes Kwon attended were taught in warehouse and in fields. At the age of seven Kwon found himself to be little and weak. Even after studying taekwondo for almost three years, he realized he could not compete with the larger boys around him by fighting with taekwondo's aggressive styling. He began to look for other forms of the martial arts to satisfy his specific needs."

In 1956 he began his study of hapkido with Ji Han-jae in Andong. At this point in history the art was still using the name Hapki Yu Kwon Sool. This was the first dojang, or martial arts school, that Master Ji opened and so the practitioners there, along with those who started training at Suh Bok Sup's Yu Kwon Sool dojang in Daegu, were among the first to train in the art. The school was called the An Moo Kwan. Some of Kwon's fellow students at that time were Yu Yong-woo and Oh Se-lim (future president of the Korea Hapkido Federation).

In 1957 Kwon moved to Seoul and continued to study under Master Ji at the first school for the art which was located in the nation's capital. The school was located in the Majang-dong district and among the other students who studied with Kwon there were Hwang Duk-kyu ( Ji's first student in Seoul ), Kang Jong-soo, Myung Kwang-sik, Kim Yong-jin, Lee Tae-jon and shortly afterward Jung Won-son and Lee Dong-koo. The following year, in 1958, when the school moved to the Joongbooshijang, the central market area of the city, Kwon's fellow students were Choi Seo-oh (first hapkido teacher in the U.S.), Myung Jae-nam (the Founder of the International Hapkido Federation in Korea and later Hankido) and Han Bong-soo (who would become one of the foremost promoters of the art abroad.)

Although Kwon started training earlier than many of the senior hapkido people, such as Master Bong Soo-han, he was younger and therefore initially was given fewer responsibilities than his older colleagues. Over time however his position grew within the largest hapkido association of the time, the Korea Hapkido Association.

== Accomplishments ==
In 1964 he opened his first hapkido dojang in Incheon where he instructed U.S. Army personnel stationed there.

In 1967 Kwon was sent by the Korean Hapkido Association to be part of a demonstration team to Vietnam teaching Korean, US, and Vietnamese troops as well as Special Forces.

In 1971 he was promoted to master instructor by the Korea Hapkido Association and became its chief judge for testing and promotions.

== Personal life ==
Kwon immigrated to California in the United States in 1973, first opening a school in Palos Verdes and later in Torrance. There, he and fellow students Kim Chong-sung and Han Bong-soo formed an early hapkido association and worked together to promote the art and support each other's efforts.

== See also ==
- Korean martial arts
- Hapkido

== References and further reading ==
- Kimm, He-young. Hapkido II. Andrew Jackson Press, Baton Rouge, Louisiana 1994.
