= Won Kwang-hwa =

Korean Hapkido Artist

- Hangul: 원광화
- RR: Won Gwanghwa
- MR: Wŏn Kwanghwa

Won Kwang-hwa was one of the earliest students of Korean hapkido under the founder of the art Choi Yong-sool and Seo Bok-seob. He was a pioneer of the art opening one of the first schools for the art in Seoul, the Moo Sul Kwan.

== Life ==
Won Kwang-hwa was born in what is now South Korea.

== Accomplishments ==
Won Kwang-hwa also served as a personal secretary and body guard to Seo Bok-seob's father, congressman Suh Dong-jin. Having first learned hapkido from Suh he later studied directly from Choi Yong-sool. In 1962, when Kim Moo-hong opened up his Shin Moo Kwan dojang in Seoul he became one the instructors there. Shortly thereafter Won opened his own school the Moo Sul Kwan.

Being an older practitioner when he started his training, and having pragmatic reasons for studying the art, Won's Moo Sul Kwan emphasized what he believed constituted practical self-defense techniques. Moo Sul Kwan emphasizes powerful and direct techniques and a greater emphasis on strength in responses rather than ki power. There is also a preference towards whole body throws than wrist centered joint locking throws.

Some of his notable students were Park Lee-hyun, Kimm He-young, Won Hyung-dae

Park Lee-Hyun brought Moo Sul Kwan Hapkido to the United States in 1969. He opened a private school in Cape Girardeau Missouri and taught as a physical education professor at Southeast Missouri State University. He was one of the two highest ranked Moo Sul Kwan Hapkido practitioners in the world.

Won Hyung-dae, his son, took over the management of the kwan upon his father's death.

== References and further reading ==
- Kimm, He-Young. Hapkido II. Andrew Jackson Press, Baton Rouge, Louisiana 1994.

== See also ==
- Korean martial arts
- Hapkido
