= Simmudo =

Korean martial arts

Simmudo is a martial art created by Grandmaster Song Pan-Gong of Siheung, Gyeonggi Province, of South Korea. Officially founded in 1999, Simmudo, pronounced shim mu doh, literally means "the way of the martial heart".

The techniques of Simmudo can be broken into three categories, hoshinsul, chaesul and kwonsul.

The self-defense (hosinsul) techniques of Simmudo are similar to Hapkido in that they use a wide variety of wrist and arm locks, come-alongs, and tripping and throwing maneuvers designed to bind the opponent and force them off balance, often into a throw.

The throwing techniques that complement these maneuvers comprise the second category of Simmudo, chaesul. They are designed to quickly drop and pin the attacker. Also similar to Hapkido, the techniques most often keep the thrower in a ready position to quickly engage additional attackers.

Kwonsul, or striking techniques, is a power-based striking system with many similarities to Tang Soo Do and Taekwondo. This includes punching and kicking common to Taekwondo, as well as trapping and blocking strikes to disable and protect.
