= Ji Han-jae =

South Korean hapkido martial artist (1936–2026)

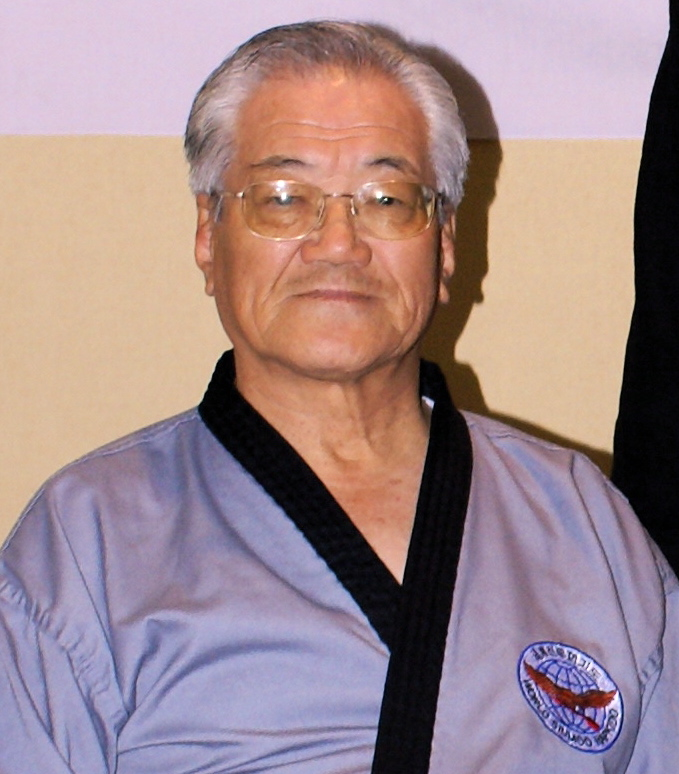
- Ji Han-jae at the first international Sin Moo Hapkido conference.
- Born: 지한재; August 1936; Andong, North Gyeongsang Province, Korea, Japan
- Died: January 28, 2026 (aged 89); Arizona, U.S.
- Nationality: South Korean
- Style: Hapkido, Sin Moo Hapkido
- Trainer: Choi Yong-sool
- Rank: Grandmaster

Other information
- Occupation: Martial artist
- Notable relatives: Fellows: Kim Moo-hong, Kim Yoon-sang, Myung Kwang-sik, Hwang In-shik
- Notable students: Kwon Tae-man
- Notable schools: An Moo Kwan, Sung Moo Kwan
- Last updated on: 2010-02-23

- Ji Han-jae
- Hangul: 지한재
- Hanja: 池漢載
- RR: Ji Hanjae
- MR: Chi Hanjae

Ji Han-jae (Korean: 지한재; August 1936 – January 28, 2026) was a South Korean hapkido grandmaster known as the founder of Sin Moo Hapkido. He appeared in the 1972 film Game of Death starring Bruce Lee.

== Training ==
Born in Andong, North Gyeongsang Province, Korea, Japan in August 1936, he began his martial arts training in 1949 under Choi Yong-sool (Korean: 최용술) and reached the rank of eighth dan. Ji trained with Choi until 1956, when he moved to Seoul to open a school of self-defense. Ji trained in the ancient methods of Korean martial arts known as Sam Rang Do Tek Gi by a man named Taoist Lee. Though this man's identity cannot be confirmed, he is believed to have trained Ji in meditation, the Korean long staff jangbong (장봉; 長棒)", short staff danbong (단봉; 短棒)" and the unique kicks of Sam Rang Do Tek Gi.

== Hapkido master ==
In 1959, Ji combined all of his martial arts knowledge and began to teach hapkido.

Many people consider Ji the founder of hapkido, while others credit his teacher Choi, who referred to his art as yawara (Korean: 야와라; 柔) or yukwonsul (Korean: 유권술; 柔拳術)". It is commonly claimed by his students that Ji was the first to use the name hapkido for the techniques he was teaching at that time. Choi's first student Seo Bok-seop, however, said in a 1980 interview that Jung Moo Kwan was the first to use the term to refer to the art as well as the symbol of the eagle to represent hapkido. Regardless, part of the kicking techniques used in many styles of hapkido is marked by changes implemented by Ji and Kim Moo-hong (Korean: 김무홍; aka Kim Moo-woong or Kim Moo-hyun), also a student of Choi. After studying with Choi, Kim went to a Buddhist temple and learned a kicking art there. Traveling to Seoul in 1961, he lived and trained with Ji for eight months and, by implementing the kicking methods they had both learned, they finalized the kicking curriculum for hapkido, significantly expanding it to include kicks to higher targets and spinning and jumping kicks, none of which were originally part of Choi's system.

In addition, Ji's original Sung Moo Kwan (Korean: 성무관) shared space with people who trained in other arts including Western boxing. Ji and his senior students developed tactics for dealing with boxing, tang soo do, taekwondo and judo and incorporated them into Ji's curriculum.

== Promoter of hapkido ==
Leaving Daegu for his hometown of Andong, Ji opened his first school, Anmoogwan (Korean: 안무관), in 1956, still calling his art yukwonsul at this time. His earliest students from this period were Kwon Tae-man (Korean: 권태만; who teaches in California today), Yoo Young-woo (Korean: 유영우) and Oh Se-lim (Korean: 오세림, former president of the Korea Hapkido Federation).

After less than a year, Ji relocated to Seoul in 1957 and founded Sung Moo Kwan (Korean: 성무관), which would become an influential kwan, or school of hapkido, producing many important teachers of the art. His first student was Hwang Deok-kyoo (Korean: 황덕규; founder of the Korean Hapkido Association) followed shortly after by Myung Kwang-sik (Korean: 명광식; founder of the World Hapkido Federation), Lee Tae-jun and Kang Jeong-soo. In 1958, students Kim Yong-jin (Korean: 김용진), Jeong Won-seon (Korean: 정원선; Retired 2007-taught in Rockford, Illinois), Han Bong-soo (of Billy Jack movie fame and founder of the International Hapkido Federation), Choi Sea-oh (First man to teach hapkido in the U.S.) and Myung Jae-nam (Korean: 명재남; Founder of the Korea-based International Hapkido Federation and Hankido). Around this time, Ji began to use the name hapkido to promote the art, shortened from the original hapki yukwonsul (Korean: 합기 유권술; 合氣柔拳術) name employed at the first school run by Choi Yong-sool and Seo Bok-seob in Daegu in 1951.

In 1961, Kim Moo-hong came to visit Ji and they developed many of the kicking techniques the art is known for.

== Organizations ==
In 1963, Ji was a founding member of the first attempt to create a large organization to include hapkido. Called the Korean Kido Association (Daehan Kidohoe; Korean: 대한 기도회) Choi Yong-sool was elected the first titular chairman with the organization's charter constitution authored by Ji, Choi and Kwon Jang. The association's purpose was to promote martial arts in the public school system and to police officers and government officials. Ji was highly instrumental in organizing this group but Choi appointed another of his top students, Kim Jeong-yoon (Korean: 김정윤), to a position above Ji, greatly diminishing his influence.

By 1965, Ji was hapkido instructor for the presidential guard at the Blue House and grew acquainted with Park Jong-kyoo (Korean: 박종규), chief of the country's security forces. Unhappy with his lack of input in the Daehan Kidohoe, with political connections and an ever-growing support from his Sung Moo Kwan students, he formed his own organization, the Korea Hapkido Association (Korean: 대한 합기도 협회), with Kim Woo-joong (Korean: 김우중), president of Daewoo Corp., as the association's first head.

Later in 1973, Ji sought to consolidate three of the larger hapkido organizations that had grown over the years by merging his body with the Korean Hapkido Association, led by his contemporary Kim Moo-hong, and the Korea Hapki Association, headed by one of his former senior students, Myung Jae-nam, to form the large and influential Republic of Korea Hapkido Association (Daehan Min Kuk Hapkido Hyub Hwe; Korean: 대한민국 합기도 협회).

== Politics ==
Ji Han-jae's political career began to rise quickly after he started teaching hapkido to the bodyguards at the presidential Blue House. In 1979, however, President Park Chung Hee was assassinated and most of those close to Park resigned, including his presidential bodyguards and their martial arts instructors like Ji.

In the ensuing power struggle, many of those in prominent positions under Park found themselves out of work, power or influence. In many cases, they were singled out as targets for legal action, justified or not.

In one case, wealthy businessmen made financial contributions to martial arts organizations per the norm at the time, but several of the contributions were not properly accounted for. Ji and his organization were charged with tax fraud. Though generally viewed as not guilty, he was given a prison term of one year. The judge in the case later explained that it was beyond his control, saying that if Ji didn't go to prison on this minor charge, he would've been charged with other offenses until he was sent to prison for more serious offenses.

Ji's philosophical view on the matter was that he found it worthwhile to experience a year in prison and learn about a side of life few experience. He added that he further developed the spiritual side of his sinmoo (higher mind) hapkido concept while meditating in prison.

Oh Se-lim, one of the earliest students of the art under Ji, was elected president of the Republic of Korea Hapkido Association. He renamed the organization Daehan Hapkido Hyub Hwe (Korean: 대한 합기도 협회), a name used in one of hapkido's former organizations that Ji had headed and Oh had been a founding member of. The Korea Hapkido Federation (KHF) became the preferred rendering in English and remains one of the most influential of the many hapkido organizations in Korea. To this day, the KHF is still run mostly by students of Ji's original Sung Moo Kwan.

== Sin Moo Hapkido founder ==
In 1984, Ji Han-jae moved to the United States and founded Sin Moo Hapkido (Korean: 신무 합기도). Before he left Korea, his close friend Myung Jae-nam, the head of the International H.K.D Federation, awarded Ji the rank of 10th dan.

Ji went by the title DoJu Ji. Doju (Korean: 도주; 道主) implies founder as Ji was the founder of Sin Moo hapkido, if not hapkido itself.

== United States ==
After Ji moved to the U.S., he attracted a large number of students, especially those keen on his Sin Moo style. He held several seminars a year in North America, Latin America and Europe and lived in Tucson, Arizona. In 2017, he went to Queens, New York for a reunion with his Hapkido co-star Angela Mao at her restaurant.

== Films ==
On his first trip to America, Ji appeared in the film Game of Death with Bruce Lee. Ji opted not to appear in the additional footage shot for the 1978 version of the film. He also appeared in Hapkido (aka Lady Kung Fu) with Angela Mao.

== Death ==
Ji died on January 28, 2026, at the age of 89.

=== Filmography ===
Year	Title	Link
1972	Hap Ki Do (a.k.a. Lady Kung Fu) (合氣道)	Cast Photos
1973	Fist of Unicorn (The Unicorn Palm; 麒麟掌)	Cast Photos
1975	The Dragon Tamers (女子跆拳群英會)	Cast Photos
1978	Game of Death (死亡遊戲)	IMDB entry

== See also ==
- Choi Yong-sool
- Seo Bok-seob
- Sin Moo Hapkido
