= Sin Moo Hapkido =

Martial art that combines "hard" and "soft" techniques

- Sin Moo Hapkido logo.

Korean name
- Hangul: 신 무 합기도
- Hanja: 神武 合氣道
- Revised Romanization: Sin Mu Hapgido
- McCune–Reischauer: Sin Mu Hapkido

Sin Moo Hapkido (pronounced as Shin Moo Hawpkido) is a martial art that combines "hard" and "soft" techniques. From a purely technical perspective, it is very closely related to its parent art, Traditional Hapkido, though it places more emphasis on meditative, philosophical, and Ki development training. Hapkido is often translated as “the way of coordinating power,” which places emphasis on the physical techniques that Hapkido is often known for. However, the founder of Sin Moo Hapkido, Ji Han-jae, has landed on a different understanding of the term. Hap means bringing together, gathering, or harmonizing. “Ki” is the energy or breath in the body that connects the mind and the body, and "Do" is the process or way this happens. Thus, his definition of Hapkido is, “The way of harmonizing the mind and body through the utilization of ki.” Sin means "higher mind or higher spirit," and "Moo" means "martial art."

When translated in its entirety, Sin Moo Hapkido therefore means, “The way of using martial arts to harmonize the mind and body to reach a higher more enlightened state of existence.”

== History ==
Sin Moo Hapkido was founded in 1983 in Seoul, South Korea by Dojunim Ji Han-jae (b. 1936) with the assistance of Merrill Jung and other members of the Northern California Hapkido Association. The curriculum was based on Ji's earlier Hapkido programs that he developed from his three teachers and own personal study. Ji, Han-jae was an early student (Dan #14) of Choi Yong-sool, a student of Yawara & Daito-Ryu Aikijujutsu, and the founder of Hapkiyusool, a forerunner of Hapkido. DoJuNim Ji, Han-jae also a student of the teacher known only as Master / Wise-Man Lee (Lee Do-sa), who taught "Sam Rang Do", weapons, and more, as well as "Grandma", who he considered to be his spiritual teacher. Though formed in Seoul, the first official school for Sin Moo Hapkido was not opened until 1984 in Daly City (very near San Francisco), California, where Ji began teaching his new art.

== The art ==
Sin Moo Hapkido incorporates a philosophy of non-violence, self-improvement, adaptability, and physical, emotional and spiritual balance, with the basic Hapkido training. Additionally, Sin Moo Hapkido formalizes a series of techniques, although at advanced levels students are expected to synthesize their own work. The use of energy flows are also emphasized in Sin Moo Hapkido.

== Techniques ==
Sin Moo Hapkido uses holds, joint locks, throws, re-direction, kicks, punches, blocks, pressure points, weapons, and energy flow techniques.

=== Holds and Joint Locks ===
Holds and joint locks are used primarily for control of an aggressor. They are primarily defensive, but at more advanced levels can be interpreted as attacks. At the 4th dan black belt there is also taught 30 special attack techniques using variations and combinations of basic locks.

=== Throws, Re-Direction and Blocks ===
Throws and re-direction of an aggressor's energy use an attacker's momentum to continue their own motion using the circular motion principle of Hapkido. These techniques depend on the incoming energy of the attack to determine their outcome; a soft or weak attack will require a small or soft re-direction. A large or powerful attack will result in a re-direction or throw that involves much more energy, translating to a more devastating outcome upon the attacker. The blocks used in Sin Moo Hapkido are usually also re-direction blocks, but some blocks are intended to be used to stop an aggressor's attack and because of this some blocks are hard blocks. Also legs are used for blocking.

=== Kicks and Punches ===
Sin Moo Hapkido uses a wide variety of strikes. Sin Moo Hapkido incorporates 25 defensive kicks that are useful in "street style" defensive situations that counter incoming attacks – out of the 25 two are specially only used to block kicks, but some of the other kicks can be used the same way also. Many of the kicks are designed for use in restricted spaces like hallways or crowds. After learning the basic 25 the student then learns 7 spin kicks, followed by many special kicks. Special kicks are harder to master but they need more room to be used, and they include doublekicks, flyingkicks, from the ground done kicks, jumpingkicks and combination kicks. Sin Moo Hapkido has numerous striking techniques.

=== Pressure Points and Energy Flow ===
Pressure points are used in Hapkido to control the physical body, and to manipulate the body's Ki to stop, disarm and disable an attacker or heal a patient. Sin Moo Hapkido uses many pressure points out of the body's over 750 pressure points. The pressure points are also referred to as vital points. Sin Moo Hapkido has a special side called Revival Techniques, which specializes on pressure point fighting and eastern medicine.

=== Weapons ===
Sin Moo Hapkido weapon training consists of the use of short stick (tan bong), long stick (jang bong), the sword (kum), cane, handkerchief, long-belt/scarf, thrown weapons (knives, rocks, etc...) and adapting everyday objects to use as weapons. Weapon training is learned in the black belt stages, but knife defense techniques are learned at Brown Belt.

== Ranks ==
Sin Moo Hapkido's ranking system is somewhat similar to other ranking systems. Gups (급, called also kups) are beginner student stages and dans (단) are advanced student stages. Though Sin Moo Hapkido has had a number of different revisions as far as rank structure, this is the current organization used by Ji, Han-jae. Lately, Dojunim Ji, Han-jae himself has associated official titles to Dan ranks, adding 10th Dan. He has asked all his top students (8th and 9th Dans) to help the "10th Dans" in their task of expanding and developing Sin Moo Hapkido.

Belt Ranks:

- White Belt
- Yellow Belt (not present in all schools)
- Orange Belt (not present in all schools)
- Green Belt
- Blue Belt
- Red Belt
- Brown Belt

Black Belts:

- 1st Dan: Black Belt
- 2nd Dan: Assistant
- 3rd Dan: Assistant Instructor
- 4th Dan: Instructor
- 5th Dan: Master
- 6th Dan: Chief Master (Cheul Do In)
- 7th Dan: Head Master (Joong Cheul Do In)
- 8th Dan: Grand Master (Sang Cheul Sun Sa)
- 9th Dan: Senior Grandmaster (Dae Cheul Sun In)
- 9th Dan: Senior Grandmaster
- 10th Dan: Supreme Grandmaster (Joong Kwang Sun Sa)
- Beyond Dan ranks : "Dojunim: Ji, Han-jae (Honorable Founder Of The Way)

== Uniform ==
There are many variations when it comes to uniforms in Sin Moo Hapkido as there was no official uniform for many years. Although a diamond pattern on the dobok top is a Hapkido designation most European schools used white uniforms with black trim, and most American schools used plain white judo uniforms for the first 15 years or so.

The current official uniform is a grey colored dobok often with ties at the bottoms (for leg weights), though many people chose to leave the legs open. There is a World Sin Moo Hapkido logo on the left lapel and an oval shaped Sin Moo Hapkido logo on the back.

The official uniform (dobok) for "Masters" rank and above, 6th Dan and higher, is white with gold trim as seen in Bruce Lee's "Game of Death" movie.

== Meditation and Ki Breathing ==
Sin Moo Hapkido has many meditation techniques. They are a combination of Buddhist, Confucian, and Taoist exercises and primarily focus on Ki development and opening the "mind's eye." Sin Moo Hapkido's first exercise is known as Danjeon Breathing and is similar to Chinese Qigong practices. Sin Moo Hapkido classes usually start with danjeon breathing and end with meditation.

== Nine basic life rules ==
Sin Moo Hapkido's has 9-Tenets which are categorized into three groups. The first three are associated with Confucianism. The second are related to Buddhism. The last three are related to Zen and Taoism. These Tenets will help the Sin Moo Hapkido practitioner to have a better and healthier life.

Physical:

- 1st Proper diet
- 2nd Healthy sexual behavior
- 3rd Beneficial meditation

Mental:

- 4th Do not be angry
- 5th Do not be sad
- 6th Do not be greedy

Spiritual:

- 7th Water balance
- 8th Air balance
- 9th Sunshine balance

== Basic techniques to attain Green Belt ==
- Danjun Breathing
- Warming up exercises
- 25 Basic Kicks
- Basic Escapes
- Push/Pull (No Resistance)
- Basic 8 Hand Techniques

 (A) Wrist Defense
 (B) Attacking
 (C) Straight punch defense
 (D) Combination wrist defense

- Front Cloth Grab Defenses
- Concentration meditation

== Basic techniques to attain Blue Belt ==
- Spin Kicks
- Punch Defense
- Cross Hand Wrist Techniques
- Behind and Body Grab Defense

== Basic techniques to attain Red Belt ==
- Kicking Styles
- Kick Defense
- Cross Hand on Top Wrist Techniques
- Choke Defense

== Basic techniques to attain Brown Belt ==
- Kicking Styles
- Knife Defense
- Side by Side Wrist Techniques
- Sit Down/Lie Down Techniques

== Basic techniques to attain Black Belt ==
- Special Kicking
- Throw Defense
- Basic Yudo Style Throws
- Advanced 8 Wrist Techniques

== Sin Moo Hapkido Grandmasters (8th+ Dan) ==
- Ji Han-jae; Do Ju, Founder
- Glenn Uesugi; 10th Dan
- Frank Croaro; 10th Dan
- Jurg Ziegler; 10th dan (deceased)
- Kenneth P MacKenzie; 10th Dan
- Merrill Jung; 10th Dan
- Geoff Booth; 10th Dan
- Inwan Kim; 10th Dan (deceased)
- John Beluschak; 10th Dan
- Larry Dorsey; Doju, 10th Dan
- John Godwin; 10th Dan
- Ian A. Cyrus; 10th Dan
- Dr. Egil Fosslien; 10th Dan (deceased)
- Farshad Azad, 10th Dan
- Kirk Koskella; 10th Dan
- Herman Mochalin; 10th Dan
- Yung T. Freda; 9th Dan
- Walter Hubmann; 9th Dan
- Perry Zmugg; 9th Dan
- Nicolas Tacchi; 9th Dan
- Rafael Balbastre; 9th Dan
- Stuart Forrest; 9th Dan
- Rony Dassen; 9th Dan (deceased)
- Lee Ka-myung; 9th Dan
- Scott Yates; 9th Dan
- Stuart Rosenberg; 9th Dan
- Carl Hettinger; 9th Dan
- Rami Vainionpää; 9th Dan

== Sin Moo Hapkido Kwans ==
Since 2014, Doju Nim Ji Han-jae has been issuing Kwan certifications. His top students are granted the authorization to develop their own Sin Moo Hapkido styles through mixing traditional Sin Moo Hapkido with their own martial arts backgrounds. This way, Sin Moo Hapkido can grow richer continuously due to top ranking Masters teaching their techniques all over the world. Here is a list of the Kwans that currently exist within the Sin Moo Hapkido family:

- Shin Yong Do (Frank Croaro)
- Shin Ki Kwan (Scott Yates)
- Yu Shin HapGi Mu yae Kwan (Ian Cyrus)
- Samil Kwan (Sean Bradley)
- Yu Sool Kwan (John Beluschak)
- Song Moo Kwan (Geoff Booth)
- Yu Hwa Kwan (Walter Hubmann)
- Han Do Kwan (Herman Mochalin)
- Jeong Hak Kwan (Nicolas Tacchi)
- Sun Bi Kwan (In Wan Kim)
- Tang Soo Kwan (John Godwin)
- Anu Kwan (Stuart Rosenberg)
- Bi Ho Kwan (Larry Dorsey)
- SinMoo Jung Shin Kwan (Ramfis Marquez)
- SinMoo Sung Hwa Do (Kirk Koskella)
- Sin Ki Kwan Kang Mu do (Min-hee Kang)
- Sin Moo Baek-Ho Kwan (Eduardo Salazar)
- Hyeon Dae (Ray Shure)

Kwans and regions are independent and they are fully authorized to issue Dan certificates. Although, the caveat is that all kwans and regions work together to preserve the legacy of Sin Moo Hapkido and Sin Moo.

However, many of them continue to work together by attending special events such as the Sinmoo Hapkido Legacy Group seminars and World Sin Moo Hapkido Federation's "International Hapkido Summit", hosted by "Joong Kwang Dae Sun Sa" Ken MacKenzie. Many Grandmasters like GM John Godwin (Tang Soo Kwan), GM Inwan Kim (Sun Bi Kwan), GM Larry Dorsey (Bi Ho Kwan) regularly attend this cooperation event.

Plus, many European Sin Moo Grandmasters like GM Walter Hubmann (head of Austrian SinMoo Hapkido), GM Rami Vainionpaa (head of Skandinavian Sin Moo Hapkido), GM Nicolas Tacchi (Jeong Hak Kwan, head of French-speaking Sin Moo Hapkido), GM Rafael Balbastre (head of Hispanic Sin Moo Hapkido) and GM Herman Mochalin (Han Do Kwan) still consider "Joong Kwang Dae Sun Sa" Jürg Ziegler as their Sin Moo teacher and attend his European seminars.

In addition, other Sin Moo Grandmasters such as Frank Croaro (First Generation-Senior Student), Farshad Azad, John Beluschak, Stuart Rosenberg, Sean Bradley, Ian A. Cyrus, and Ramfis Marquez, & Scott Yates continue to preserve the legacy of Sin Moo Hapkido for future generations.
