= Oh Se-lim =

South Korean hapkidoin

Oh Se-Lim
- Born: 오세림; Korea
- Other names: Oh Se-Rim
- Nationality: South Korea
- Style: Hapkido
- Trainer: Ji Han-Jae
- Rank: former president of KHF, Grandmaster

Other information
- Occupation: Martial artist
- Notable relatives: Kwon Tae-Man (fellow)
- Notable club: Korea Hapkido Federation (KHF)
- Notable schools: Sung Moo Kwan, An Moo Kwan
- Last updated on: 2010-02-24

- Oh Se-lim
- Hangul: 오세림
- RR: O Serim
- MR: O Serim

Oh Se-Lim (Korean: 오세림) was an early Korean hapkido practitioner and a pioneer of the art. He had been the president of the Korea Hapkido Federation for 18 years.

== Life ==
Oh began his study of hapkido at Ji Han-Jae (지한재)'s first hapki yukwonsool school, the An Moo Kwan (안무관) in Andong, Gyeongsangbuk-do. Fellow students were Kwon Tae-Man (권태만), and Yoo Young-Woo (유영우).

He continued training at Majang, Seongdong, Seoul in 1957. Oh joined other senior practitioners already training in Seoul at that time, early hapkido practitioners Hwang Deok-Kyoo (황덕규; latter day president of the Korea Hapkido Association), Myung Kwang Sik (명광식; latter day founder of the World Hapkido Federation), Lee Tae Jun (이태준), Kim Yong-Jin (김용진; founder of the Ulji Kwan), Kang Jong-Soo (강종수), and Kim Yong-Whan.

== Accomplishments ==
Oh Se-Lim was elected the president of the Korea Hapkido Association in 1980. By 1983 Oh Se-Lim, with political problems and many of the original founding members of the Korea Hapkido Association departing (Ji Han-Jae, Myung Jae-Nam), renamed the association by the name first used by the organization he had first been a part of with Master Ji, the Dae Han Hapkido Hyub Hoe (대한 합기도 협회), with a new preferred English rendering; the Korea Hapkido Federation (KHF). Master Oh resigned the position of the president of the KHF, that was succeeded by Kim Jong-Yoon (김종윤) in 2008.

== See also ==
- Korean martial arts
- Hapkido
