= Kim Moo-hong =

South Korean hapkidoin

- Hangul: 김무홍
- RR: Gim Muhong
- MR: Kim Muhong

Kim Moo-hong (also known as Kim Moo-woong or Kim Mu-hyun) was one of the earliest students of Korean hapkido under the founder of the art Choi Yong-sool. He was a pioneer of the art opening one of the first schools for the art in Seoul. A great innovator he is credited with having helped develop the kicking system used in most hapkido schools today. He formed one of the earliest Korean organizations for the art, the Korean Hapkido Association.

== Life ==
Kim Moo-hong was born in Daegu in what is now South Korea.

== Accomplishments ==
A notable student from the Choi and Suh's Yu Kwon Sool dojang was Kim Moo-hong, who later taught at Suh's Joong Ang dojang in Daegu. Suh, who promoted Kim to 4th degree, credits Kim with the development of many kicks which are still used in hapkido today. Master Kim apparently took the concepts from very basic kicks he had learned from Choi and went to a temple to work on developing them to a much greater degree. Later, in 1961, Kim travelled to Seoul and while staying at Master Ji Han-jae's Sung Moo Kwan dojang they finalized the kicking curriculum.

Kim went on to found his Shin Moo Kwan dojang in the Jong Myo section of Seoul, also in 1961. Won Kwang-wha and Kim Jung-soo also served as instructors at this dojang. Kim's notable students were Lee Han-chul, Kim Woo-tak (who founded the Kuk Sool Kwan Hapkido dojang), Huh Il-woong, Lee Joo-bang (who founded modern Hwarang-do), Na Han-dong, Shin Dong-ki, Suh In-hyuk (who founded Kuk Sool Won) and Kim, Jong-yun (President of the Korea Hapkido Federation).

Originally a member of the Korea Kido Association, the organization sent Master Kim to teach hapkido in the United States in 1969. Upon returning to Korea in 1970, Kim looked to Ji Han-jae's move to set up his own organization and with the encouragement of his students followed suit and founded the Korean Hapkido Association (Hangook Hapkido Association) in 1971. Later he combined this organization with the groups led by Ji Han-jae and Myung Jae-nam to form the Republic of Korea Hapkido Association.

== References and further reading ==
- Kimm, He-young. Hapkido II. Andrew Jackson Press, Baton Rouge, Louisiana 1994.
