= Hapkido =

Korean martial art

- Also known as: Hapkido, Hap Ki Do, Hapki-Do
- Focus: Striking, Grappling, Hybrid, Weapon
- Country of origin: South Korea
- Creator: No single creator; collaborative effort of Choi Yong-sool's earliest students
- Famous practitioners: Seo Bok-seob; Ji Han-jae; Myung Kwang-sik; Han Bong-soo; Oh Se-lim; Kim Yoon-sang; Jackie Chan; Angela Mao; Sammo Hung; Wesley Snipes; Byun Baekhyun; Tom Laughlin
- Ancestor arts: Daitō-ryū Aiki-jūjutsu; Taekkyeon; Tang Soo Do; Judo; Chinese martial arts
- Descendant arts: Sin Moo Hapkido; Hapkidowon; Jung Ki Hapkido; Huek Choo Kwan Hapkido; Hapmudo; Hankido; Hwa Rang Do; Kuk Sul Won; Combat Hapkido; Hapki yusul; Kwan Nyom Hapkido; Tong Hap Kwan Hapkido; Tong Hap Kwan Hoshinsul; LaiMu Kwan Hapkido; Gongkwon Yusul; Teukgong Moosool; Yongmudo

Korean name
- Hangul: 협기도
- Hanja: 協氣道
- RR: hyeopgido
- MR: hyŏpkido
- IPA: [hap̚.ki.do]

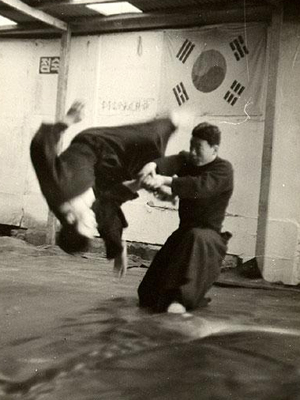
Hapkido

Hapkido (UK: /ˌhæpkiːˈdoʊ/ HAP-kee-DOH, US: /hɑːpˈkiːdoʊ/ hahp-KEE-doh, Korean: 합기도; RR: hapgido; pronounced [hap̚.ki.do]), also spelled hap ki do or hapki-do, is a Korean martial art. It is a hybrid form of self-defense that employs joint locks, chokeholds, throwing techniques, kicks, punches, and other striking attacks. It also teaches the use of traditional weapons, including knife, sword, rope, nunchaku (ssang juhl bong), cane (ji pang ee), short stick (dan bong), and middle-length staff (joong bong), gun (analogous to the Japanese jō), and bō (Japanese), which vary in emphasis depending on the particular tradition examined.

Hapkido employs both long-range and close-range fighting techniques, utilizing jumping kicks and percussive hand strikes at longer ranges, and pressure point strikes, joint locks, and throws at closer fighting distances. Hapkido emphasizes circular motion, redirection of force, and control of the opponent. Practitioners seek to gain advantage over their opponents through footwork and body positioning to incorporate the use of leverage, avoiding the use of brute strength against brute strength.

The art was adapted from Daitō-ryū Aiki-jūjutsu as it was taught by Choi Yong-sool (최용술) when he returned to Korea after World War II after having lived in Japan for 30 years. This system was later combined by Choi's disciples with kicking and striking techniques of indigenous and contemporary arts such as Taekkyon and Tang Soo Do, as well as various throwing techniques and ground fighting self-defense techniques from Japanese Judo.

== Hapkido ==
Hapkido or 협기도 in the native Korean writing system hangul is rendered as 協氣道 in hanja. This is similar to how the Japanese Aikido was written using Kyūjitai in the pre-1946 period. Currently, though, the second character is preferably written in Japanese using shinjitai, which replaces the original 氣 with the modern, simplified 気, thus reducing the number of strokes by four.

In hanja, the character 協 hap means coordinated, merged, or combined; 氣 ki literally means air, gas or breath but is used to mean spirit or so-called 'internal energy'; and 道 do means "way" or "art", yielding a literal translation of "joining-energy-way". It is most often translated as "the way of coordinating energy", "the way of coordinated power", or "the way of harmony".

Although Japanese Aikido and Korean hapkido share common technical origins, in time they have become separate and distinct from one another. They differ significantly in philosophy, range of responses, and manner of executing techniques. The fact that they share the same Japanese technical ancestry represented by their respective founders' practice of Daitō-ryū Aiki-jūjutsu, and that they share some Chinese characters, despite 協 being pronounced "ai" in Japanese and "hap" in Korean, has proved problematic in promoting hapkido internationally as a discipline with its own set of unique characteristics differing from those common to Japanese martial arts.

== History and major figures from Korea ==
The birth of modern hapkido can be traced to the efforts of a group of Korean nationals in the post-Japanese colonial period of Korea, namely Choi Yong-sool (최용술) (1904–1986) and his most prominent students: Chinil Chang, his personally chosen successor; Seo Bok-Seob, the first student of the art; Ji Han-jae (1936–2026), one of the earliest promoters of the art; Jung Hwan Park, a long time student of Choi; Kim Moo-hong, a major innovator; Myung Jae-nam, a connector between the art of hapkido and aikido; and Myung Kwang-sik the historian and ambassador, all of whom were direct students of Choi or of his immediate students.

=== Choi Yong-sool ===
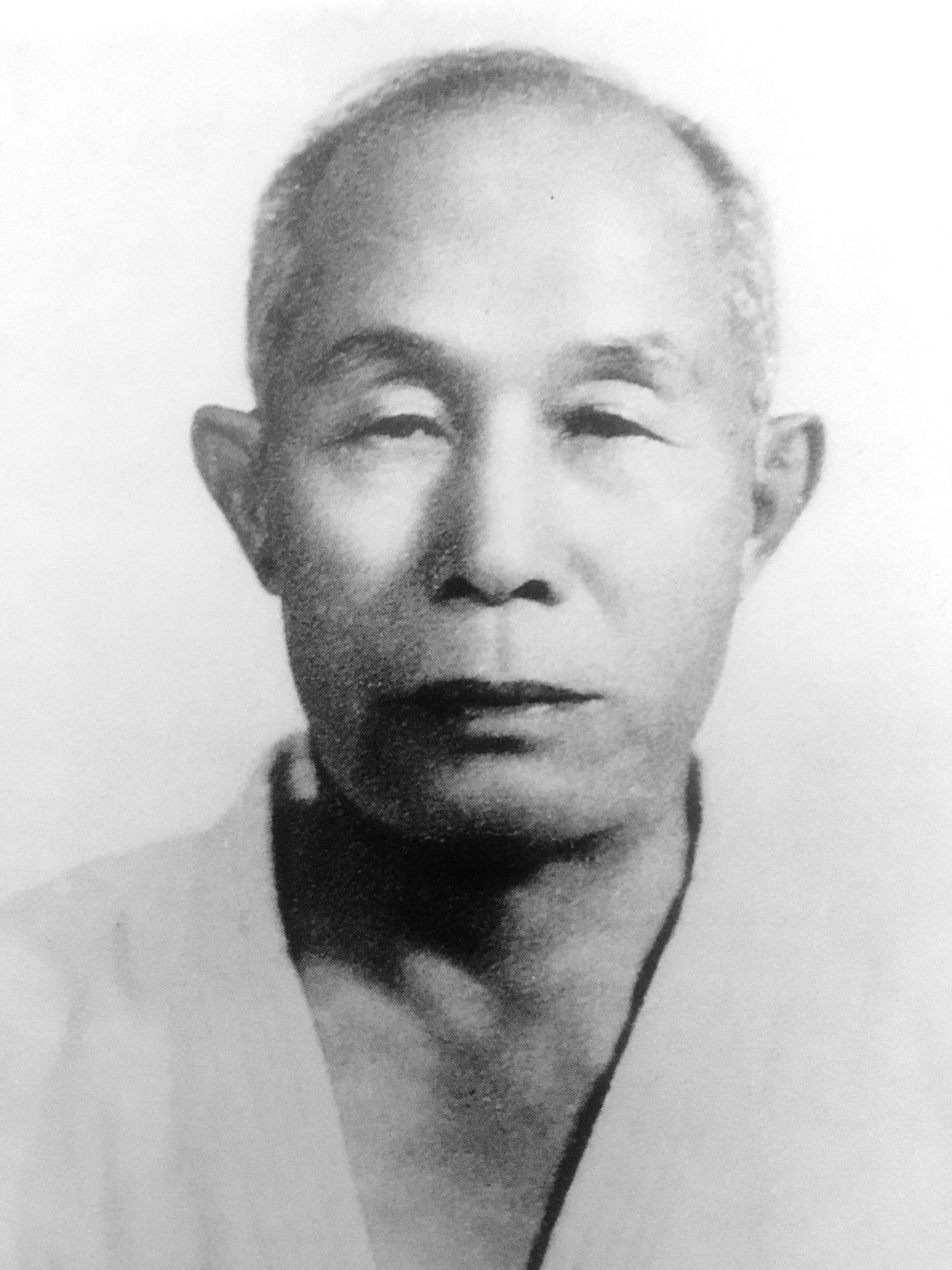
Master Choi Yong-sool (c. 1954)

Choi Yong-sool (최용술)'s training in martial arts is a subject of contention. It is known that Choi was sent to Japan as a young boy and returned to Korea with techniques characteristic of Daitō-ryū Aiki-jūjutsu, a forerunner of aikido.

The subsequent history is quite controversial in Daitō-ryū circles but is claimed by many contemporary hapkido-ists and is attributed to Choi in an interview that took place during a trip Choi made to the United States in 1980 to visit his direct lineage successor Chin-il Chang in New York City. In the interview with Chin-il Chang, Choi claimed to have been adopted by Takeda Sōkaku when he was 11 years old and to have been given the Japanese name Yoshida Asao. He claims to have been taken to Takeda's home and dojo in Akita on Shin Shu mountain where he lived and trained with the master for 30 years. The interview also asserts that he travelled with him as a teaching assistant, that he was employed to catch war deserters and that he was the only student to have a complete understanding of the system taught by Takeda.

This is contradicted by other claims asserting that Choi was simply a worker in the home of Takeda. The meticulous enrollment and fee records of Tokimune Takeda, Takeda's eldest son and Daitō-ryū's successor, do not seem to include Choi's name among them. Therefore, except for claims made by Choi himself, there is little evidence that Choi was the adopted son of Takeda. Kondo Katsuyuki (current head of the mainline Daito Ryu) has however released a page from Takeda Sokaku's eimeiroku that contains Choi Yong-sul's name.

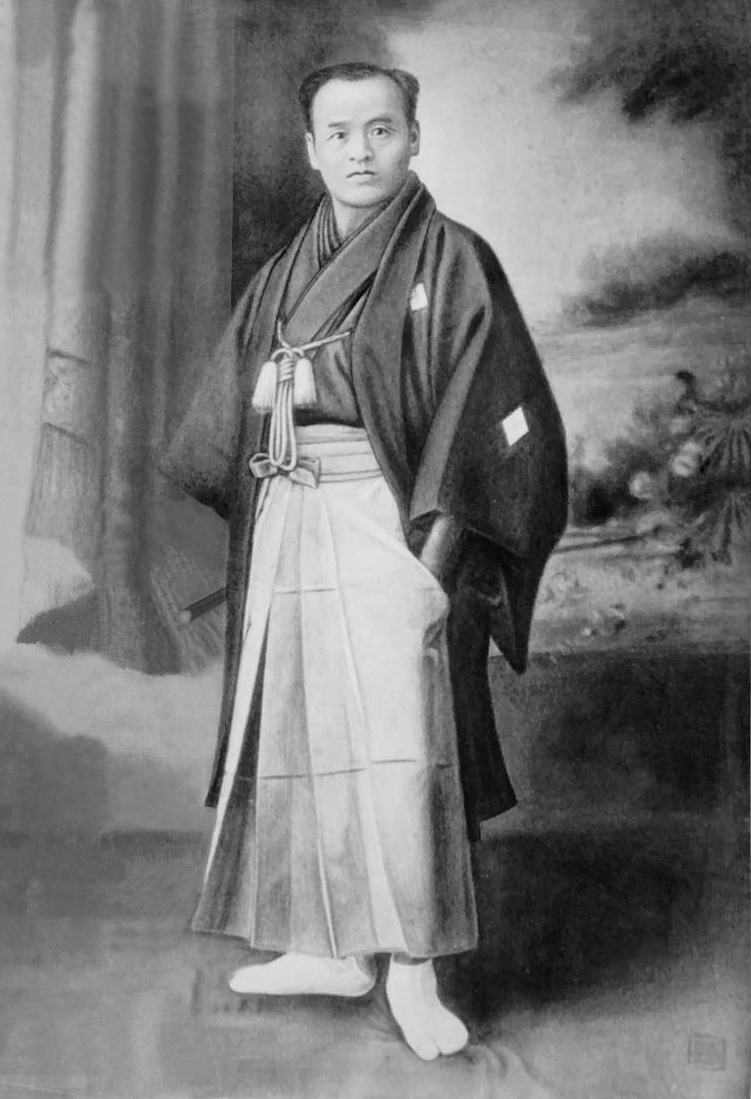
Retouched photograph of the master of Daito Ryu Aiki-jujutsu Takeda Sōkaku (c. 1888)

Stanley Pranin, then of Aiki News and now editor of the Aikidojournal.com, asked Kisshomaru Ueshiba about Choi Yong-sool and hapkido:

On another subject, it is true that a Korean named "Choi" who founded hapkido studied aikido or Daito-ryu?

I don't know what art it was but I understand that there was a young Korean of about 17 or 18 who participated in a seminar of Sokaku Takeda Sensei held in Asahikawa City in Hokkaidō. It seems that he studied the art together with my father and would refer to him as his "senior".

If that's the case the art must have been Daito-ryu.

I've heard that this man who studied Daito-ryu had some contact with my father after that. Then he returned to Korea and began teaching Daito-ryu on a modest scale. The art gradually became popular and many Koreans trained with him. Since aikido became popular in Japan he called his art hapkido [written in Korean with the same characters as aikido]. Then the art split into many schools before anyone realized it. This is what my father told me. I once received a letter from this teacher after my father's death.

While Kondo Katsuyuki has released documentation from Takeda Sokaku's eimeiroku that confirms that Choi Yong-sul did in fact study with him for a short time, some scholars believe it is likely that Choi received most of his training in Daito Ryu from Yoshida Kotaro.

Choi Yong-sool's first student, and the man whom some claim helped him develop the art of hapkido was Seo Bok-seob, a Korean judo black belt when they met. Some of Choi's other respected senior students are: Chinil Chang, Lim Hyun-soo, Ji Han-Jae, Chung Kee-tae, Kim Moo-hong, and arguably Suh In-hyuk (Korean: 서인혁) and Lee Joo-bang (Korean: 이주방) who went on to form the arts of Kuk Sool Won and modern Hwa Rang Do respectively (though some argue that their training stems from time spent training under Kim Moo-hong).

=== Chang (Jang) In-mok ===
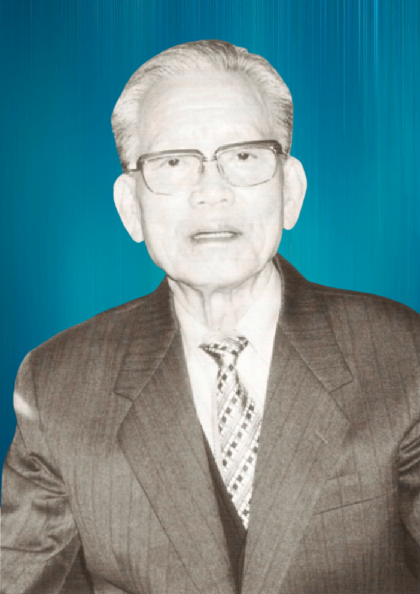
Grand Patriarch Dr. Chang In-mok (1960)

Grand Patriarch Jang In-mok (born 15 August 1912) of Daegu, who also trained under Takeda Sokaku's lineage, returned to Daegu in 1945 like Grand Patriarch Choi Yong-sul. He was a doctor of Oriental medicine and taught aikijitsu as hapkido. Jang learned Dae Dong Ryu Yu Sul Hapkido from his teachers Masuta Yutaka and Takeda Sokaku in Japan. Choi Yong-sool trained many students but Jang only trained a few. Jang's notable students included Han-young Choi (Chun Ki Do), Jang Seeung-ho, Song Joon-hwi, Hu Il-wong (teacher of Peter and Joseph Kim) and Song Il-hun. He introduced the Dae Don Ryu Sul system to Korea in 1960. He first learned martial arts in Japan in September 1928 with Daito-ryu Jujitsu and received his certificate in 1935 from Yutaka, a student of Sokaku.

=== Han-young Choi ===
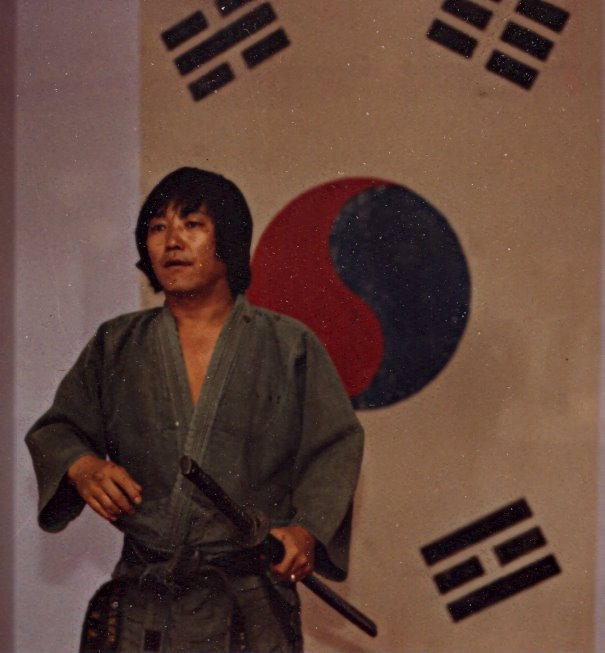
Grand Master Han-young Choi in his first gym in El Paso (1980)

Kwang Jang Nim Han-young Choi was born in Kyongkido, Korea December 11, 1935. He began his formal martial arts training at the age of four, instructed by his father (Chun-san Choi) and his uncle (Man-san Choi), in 1939 to learn his family's martial arts system, a system based on stepping, spinning, and jumping. The founder of Chun Ki Do Hapkido Grand Master Han-young Choi learned also Taekwondo Mudokwan under Grandmaster Hwang Kee Hwang Ki and was also a top student and pioneer of Taekwondo in Korea. Choi, Han-young Choi, was the first student of Dr. Chang In-mok's Dae Dong Ryu Yu Sul system in Seoul. His martial arts are based on stepping techniques (triangle step, cross step, skip step), turning and jumping. His early years of formal training at a Buddhist monastery in Kyongi do, where he learned meditation, breathing, and application into the physical world. Hounslow (developed into modern hapkido) – joint manipulation from Grandmaster Chang In Mok. Grandmaster Chang has the same training and lineage as Grandmaster Choi Yong-sul...both brought what is now known as hapkido to Korea from Japan, except Grandmaster Choi commercialized it and Grandmaster Chang did not. Grandmaster Chang focused on oriental medicine and acupuncture. He Choi learned acupuncture and pressure points from him. Before he founded the World Chun Ki Association, he belonged to the Daehan Hapkido association and Kuk Sool Won Association. One of his best friends was Suh In-hyuk's older brother, Seo In-Suk, and he asked Grandmaster Choi to help spread Kuk Sool Won in Seoul. In the old days, they spread martial arts by fighting the owner of the neighbourhood schools. Then taking them over and changing the names and techniques. One school at a time, he went neighbourhood by neighbourhood, fighting school owners and taking over schools in the name of Kuk Sool Won. Then he moved to the U.S. and after getting fed up with the politics of Daehan and Kuk Sool Won™, he quit and founded the World Chun Ki Do Association.

Choi, Han-young, was also a pioneer of the Taekwondo Han Moo Kwan system. He held the number one Black Belt certificate from the Han Moo Kwan. Choi, after he had studied for three years under Dr. Chang In-mok, moved to Seoul and began to teach Dae Dong Ryu Yu Sul. But he joined the Kuk Sool organization and taught Dae Dong Ryu Sul under the Kuk Sool name. One of his best friends was Suh In-hyuk's older brother, Seo In-Suk, who asked him to help spread Kuk Sool Won™ in Seoul. He also belonged to the Daehan Hapkido association. In 1972, Choi Han-young immigrated to the United States and moved to El Paso, Texas. He created his own system called Choi's Martial Arts, and later in the 1990s, he renamed it to Chun Ki (Heavenly Power 天氣). It was his ambition to acquire DO so that Chun Ki Do could become accepted as a new style. Grandmaster's goal was to develop his own martial art to reach the 10th-degree black belt. So Chun Ki was born. It took a long time and a lot of work to add the long-dreamed-of DO, and Chun Ki Do gained recognition in the realm of hapkido. As a new style in the greater hapkido world, Grand Master Han-young Choi was awarded the title of Grand Patriarch, the founder of Chun Ki Do Hapkido. He has trained over 50,000 students in Asia, Europe, and America and is respected by many as one of the few remaining original Hapkido Grandmasters.

A few notable students were his son Sam Choi, Daniel Ray Walker, and Roman Nikolaus Urban, who founded the Chun Ki Do Association in Africa and Europe; Jaeshin Cho, his nephew; and Gregory Jump, his first top-student.

=== Seo Bok-seob ===
Choi's first student and the first person known to have opened up a dojang under Choi was Seo Bok-seob (서복섭, also spelled Suh Bok-sup).

In 1948, when Seo Bok-sub was still in his early 20s, he had already earned his black belt in judo and was a graduate of Korea University. After watching Choi Yong-sool successfully defend himself against a group of men when an argument erupted in the yard of the Seo Brewery Company, Seo who was son of the chairman of the company, invited Choi to begin teaching martial arts to him and some workers at the distillery where he had prepared a dojang.

In 1951, Seo opened up the first proper dojang called the "Daehan Hapki Yukwonsool Dojang (대한합기유권술도장)". Seo also incorporated many of judo's throws and ground work techniques to the teachings of master Choi. The first symbol for hapkido was designed by Seo, which was used to denote the art was the inverted arrowhead design featured in both the modern incarnation of the KiDo Association and by Myung Kwang-Sik's World Hapkido Federation. Choi Yong-sool was also employed during this time as a bodyguard to Seo's father who was a congressman. Seo and Choi agreed to shorten the name of the art from 'hapki yu kwon sool' to 'hapkido' in 1959.

=== Ji Han-jae ===
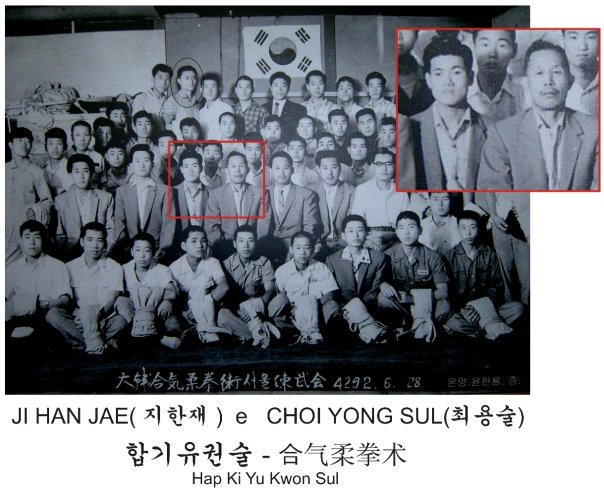
Grand Master Ji Han-jae (left) and Hapkido founder Choi Yong-sul (right)

Ji Han-jae (지한재) was undoubtedly the prime mover in the art of Korean hapkido. It is due to his physical skills, technical contributions, promotional efforts and political connections as head hapkido instructor to the presidential body guard under Korean President Park Chung-hee that hapkido became popularized, first within Korea and then internationally.

If the martial art education of Choi Yong-sool is unconfirmed, the same must be said for martial art history of Ji Han-jae's training, apart from his time as a student of Choi. Ji was an early student (Dan #14) of Choi. He details that prior to opening his martial art school in Seoul, the Sung Moo Kwan (성무관), he also supposedly studied from a man known as 'Taoist Lee' and an old woman he knew as 'Grandma'.

As a teacher of hapkido, Ji incorporated traditional Korean kicking techniques (from Taoist Lee and the art Sam Rang Do Tek Gi) and punching techniques into the system and gave the resulting synthesis the name hapkido in 1957.

Although a founding member of the Korea Kido Association (대한기도회) in 1963 with Choi Yong-sool as titular chairman and Kim Jeong-yoon as Secretary General and Head Instructor for the association, Ji found himself not able to exert as much control over the organization as he might have wished. To this end and with the support of the Head of the Security Forces, Park Jong-kyu, Ji founded the very successful Korea Hapkido Association (대한 합기도 협회) in 1965.

Later, when this organization combined with the organizations founded by Myung Jae-nam (Korea Hapki Association/한국 합기회) and Kim Moo-Hong (Korean Hapkido Association/한국 합기도 협회) in 1973, they became the very extensive and influential organization known as the Republic of Korea Hapkido Association (대한민국 합기도 협회).

In 1984, after being released from prison for fraud, Ji moved first to Germany and then to the United States, and founded Sin Moo Hapkido (신무 합기도), which incorporates philosophical tenets, a specific series of techniques (including kicks) and healing techniques into the art. Three of Ji Han-jae's notable students in Korea were Kwon Tae-man (권태만), Myung Jae-nam (명재남) and Chang Young-shil (장영실) who is the current president of the International Hapkido Federation. Ji can be seen in the films Lady Kung-fu and Game of Death in which he takes part in a long fight scene against Bruce Lee.

After the death of Choi Yong-sool in 1986, Ji came forward with the assertion that it was he who founded the Korean art of hapkido, asserting that Choi Yong-sool taught only yawara based skills and that it was he who added much of the kicking and weapon techniques we now associate with modern hapkido. The reality being that Grandmaster Choi Yong-sool taught him little of the original art and higher level techniques so he fabricated a new system on his own terms. He also asserted that it was he who first used the term 'hapkido' to refer to the art. While both claims are contested by some of the other senior teachers of the art, what is not contested is the undeniably huge contributions made by Ji to the art, its systematization and its promotion worldwide.

=== Chang Chin-il ===
Chang Chinil Hapkido 2nd Doju ceremony
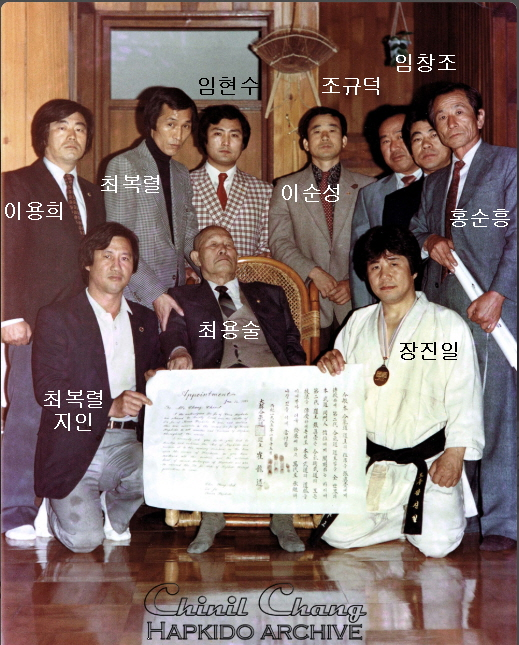
Photos courtesy of cchapkido.com

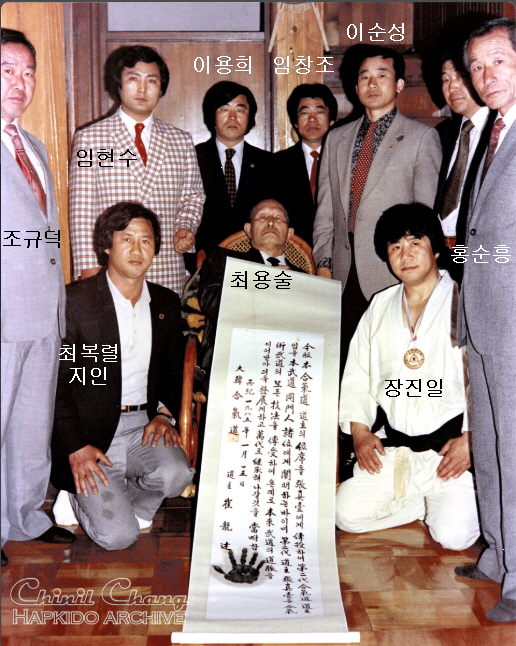

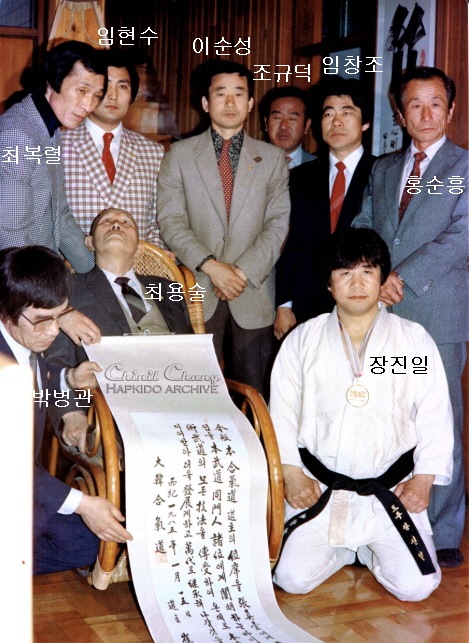

A direct student of Choi, Chin-il Chang (장진일) inherited the title of Doju in Choi's personal and complete system of hapkido on January 15, 1985, becoming the second direct lineage Grandmaster.

On April 5, 1985, Choi personally awarded Chang with the title of Doju (Keeper of the way). Chang also had the privilege and honor of being the first hapkido master awarded the 9th Dan certificate by Choi in 1980.

A large inauguration ceremony followed on April 11, 1985. The historic event was covered and documented by Korea Sports News and MBC Korean Television. Choi Young-sool, Chang, and Choi's son, the late Choi Bok-yeol, were in attendance. Choi left the full documentation and recordings of the system to Chang, who continued to research and document the full history and development of hapkido.

Furthermore, the future Grandmaster, who was a personally trained, closed-door disciple of Choi, was given Letter of Appointment certificates, the second dated December 1, 1977, and the third dated March 5, 1980. This gave Chang more progressive power and authority in Choi's Hapkido Association. These specific certificates, along with his 9th Dan ranking in 1980, and Doju title in 1985, amply demonstrate that Choi was grooming Chang to be the future Grandmaster of Hapkido.

Chang's intimate video interview (one of several over decades) with his teacher Doju Choi during his visit to New York City has been abused through numerous interpretations and translations. Some have even claimed erroneously to have conducted the interview themselves, further clouding and distorting the truth and gravity inherent in the interview. These endless distortions were generally rebutted in various media each time they appeared.

Doju Chang continues to teach in New York City after decades of maintaining a commercial school, as well as a stint teaching hapkido at the United Nations. He currently teaches a small group in NYC dedicated to the preservation of hapkido. Many detractors have spread endless conjecture about him. One lineage created further controversy by stating Choi passed the system to his only son, Choi Bok-yeol, which is incorrect, misleading, and insulting to the legacy and wishes of Choi. Black Belt Magazine, respecting Chin-il Chang as the second lineage successor, asked him to write a brief obituary on Choi that appeared in the April 1987 issue.

Doju Chang died peacefully in his sleep on February 23, 2018, at the age of 77 as a result of hypertensive cardiovascular disease.

=== Kim Moo-hong ===
Kim Moo-hong (김무홍; alternately rendered as Kim Moo-woong or Kim Mu-hyun) was a student from the Choi and Seo's Daehan Hapki Yukwonsool Dojang, who later taught at Seo's main dojang in Taegu. Seo, who promoted Kim to 4th degree, credits Kim with the development of many kicks which are still used in hapkido today. Kim apparentally took the concepts from very basic kicks he had learned from Choi and went to a temple to work on developing them to a much greater degree. Later, in 1961, Kim travelled to Seoul and while staying at Ji Han-jae's Sung Moo Kwan dojang they finalized the kicking curriculum.

Kim went on to found his Shin Moo Kwan dojang (신무관) in the Jongmyo section of Seoul, also in 1961. Won Kwang-hwa (원광화) and Kim Jung-soo(김정수) also served as instructors at this dojang. Kim's notable students were Lee Han-cheol (이한철), Kim Woo-tak (김우탁; who founded the Kuk Sool Kwan Hapkido dojang), Huh Il-woong (허일웅), Lee Joo-bang (이주방; who founded modern Hwa Rang Do), Na In-dong (나인동), Shin Dong-ki (신동기) and Seo In-hyuk (서인혁; who founded Kuk Sool Won).

Originally a member of the Korea Kido Association, the organization sent Kim to teach hapkido in the United States in 1969. Upon returning to Korea in 1970, Kim looked to Ji Han-Jae's move to set up his own organization and with the encouragement of his students followed suit and founded the Korean Hapkido Association in 1971. Later he combined this organization with the groups led by Ji Han-Jae and Myung Jae-nam to form the Republic of Korea Hapkido Association.

=== Lim Hyun-soo ===
Lim Hyun-soo was born in Geochang County, South Gyeongsang Province, of Korea on September 7, 1944. In 1965 he visited hapkido founder Choi Yong-sool and experienced the martial art for the first time. In 1965, Lim began his training in hapkido under Kim Yeung-jae, the chief instructor at Choi's studio. From 1978, Lim attained all of his ranks and training directly from Choi. During his training, Lim endured strict and intense training. With Choi's blessing, he launched jungkigwan on October 24, 1974. In 1976, Choi retired and closed his studio and joined jungkigwan, though he retired from public teaching. Choi privately taught Lim during his visits and also spent his days at the studio playing baduk (Go) with Lim. During these times, Lim asked Choi about Hapkido techniques.

Lim based jungkigwan in Daegu and was promoted to 9th dan by Choi. Lim is an accomplished swordsman and created Chung Suk Kuhapdo after studying sword styles in Japan and Korea. Choi told Lim that learning swordsmanship would be an essential component to his hapkido training. Lim attends his studio daily to teach students from home and abroad. Since 1996, he has visited the U.S. many times for seminars. In addition, he has hosted Hapkido and Chung Suk Kuhapdo seminars in European countries such as Sweden and the Netherlands.

Doju Choi Yong-sool & GM Lim Hyun-soo at the JUNGKIKWAN
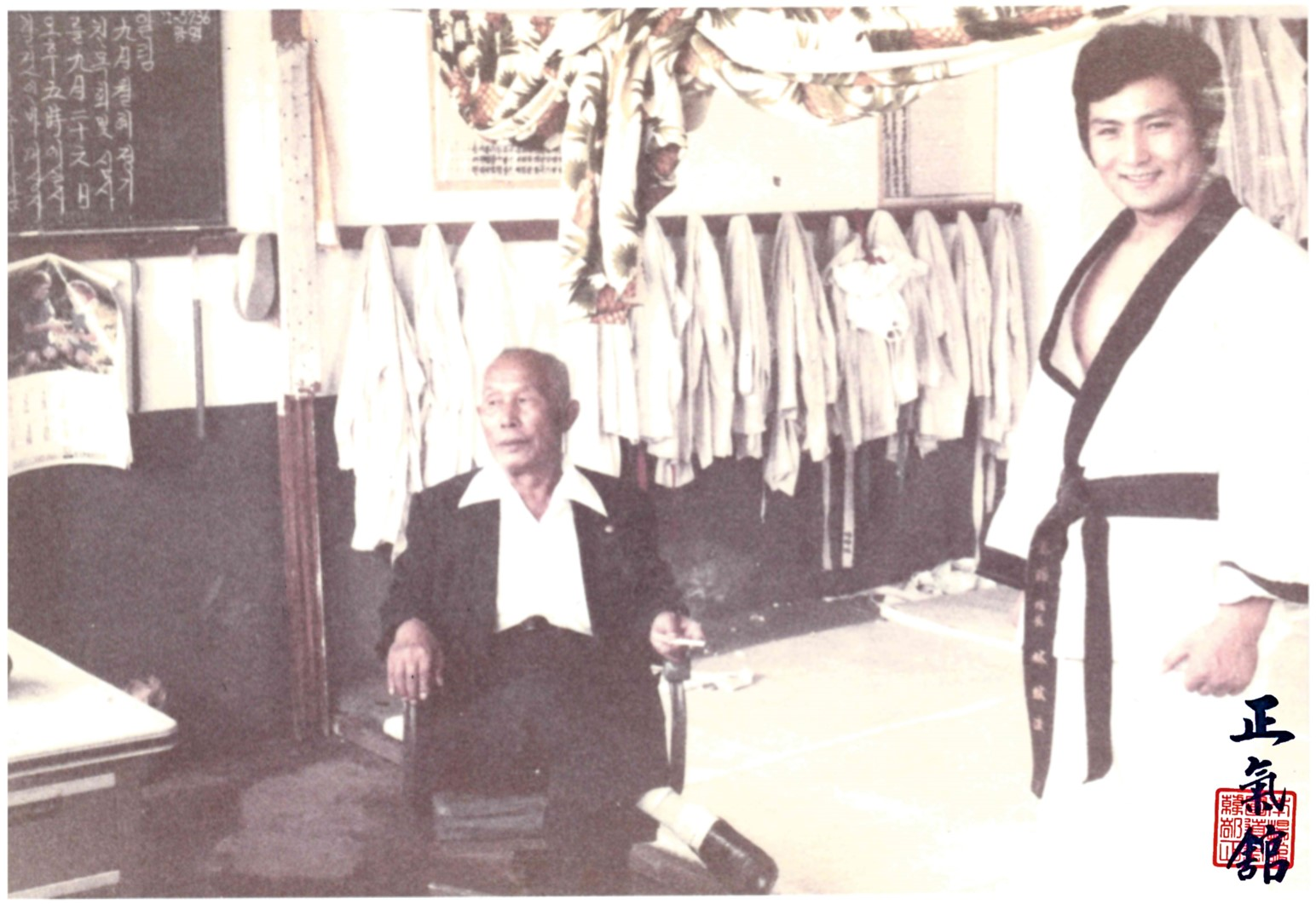

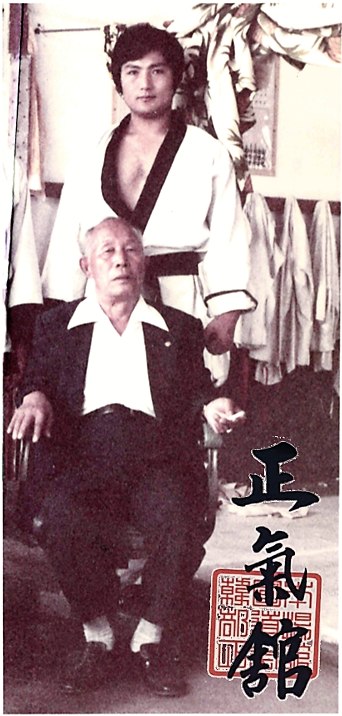

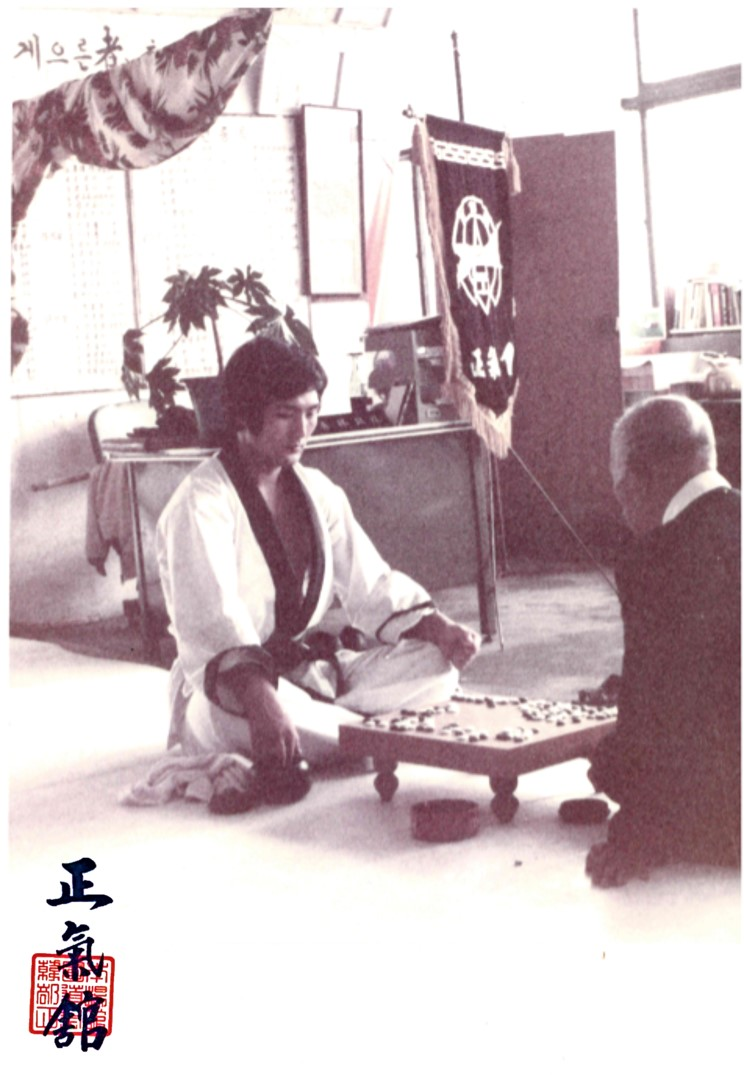
Doju Choi Yong-sool & GM Lim Hyun-soo at the JUNGKIKWAN 2
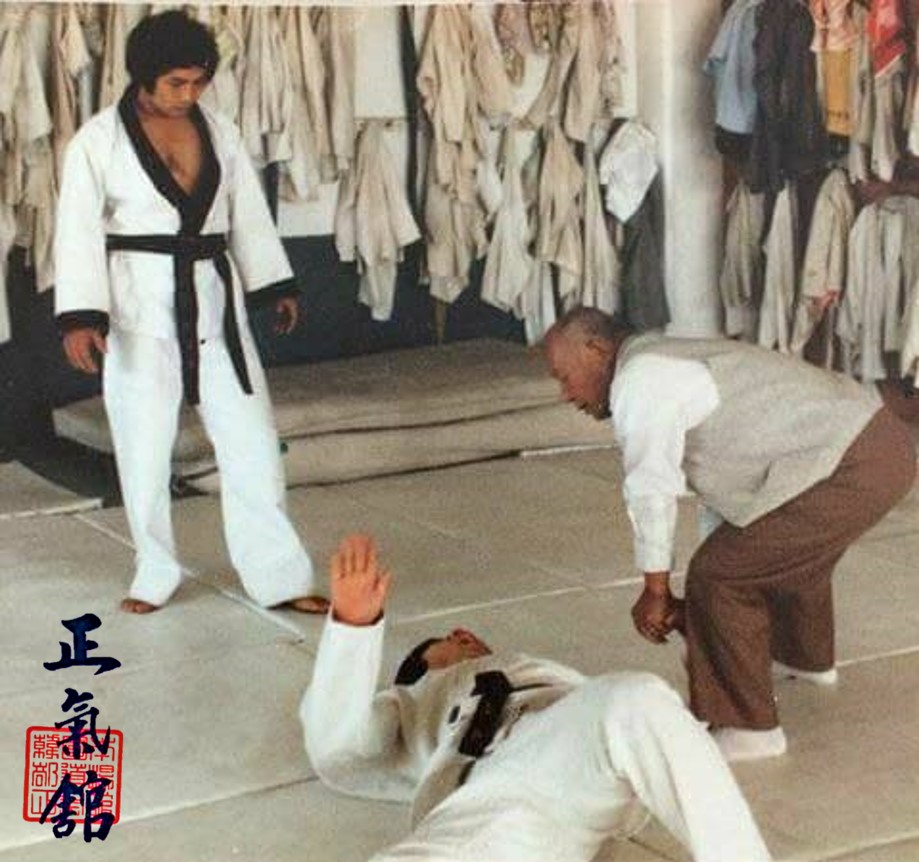

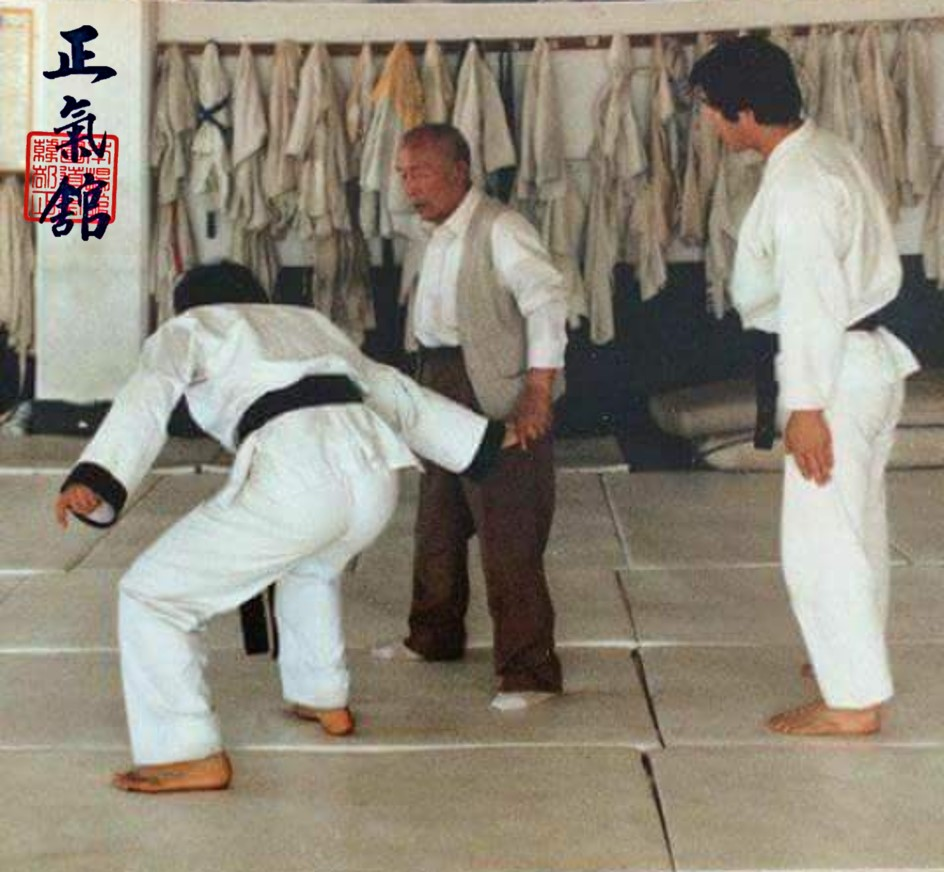

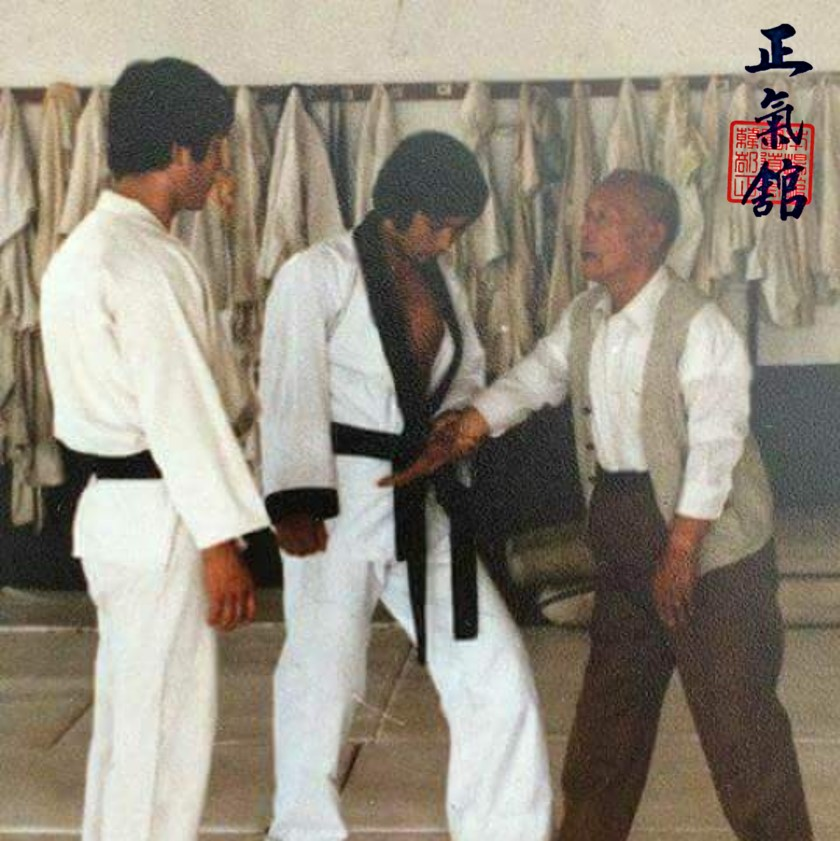

=== Han Bong-soo ===
Han Bong-soo (한봉수; alternately rendered as Bong-soo Han) began his training in hapkido after seeing a demonstration put on by the founder, Yong-sul Choi. From then on, he committed himself to hapkido training under Choi and other teachers, but never received any direct high ranking from Choi himself. Han was one of the world's foremost practitioners of hapkido, and is referred to as the Father of his own offshoot of modern hapkido in the Western World. He led a dedicated effort in the development of his own version of hapkido. He taught thousands of loyal students throughout his life with many becoming masters themselves. Other masters across all styles have sought out his wisdom and teachings.

In 1967, Han emigrated to the United States of America, first staying with and teaching at his friend S. O. Choi's hapkido school in California. Han later opened his own school in Los Angeles in 1968. His early years were difficult and he worked in a factory during the day while he taught at a struggling hapkido school in the evening located in an economically depressed area. Later, he relocated his school to the Pacific Palisades area in an effort to be closer to Hollywood and the movie industry.

On July 4, 1969, Han Bong-soo was giving a demonstration of hapkido at a park in Pacific Palisades, California. In the audience was Tom Laughlin. After a spectacular demonstration, Laughlin approached Han about being involved in a movie project called Billy Jack. Han gained critical acclaim for staging and performing some of the most realistic martial arts fight sequences in a film. Before Billy Jack, movies contained at most brief references to martial arts, with fights portrayed by actors who had little training. With Billy Jack, Han introduced authentic hapkido techniques to Western audiences. In its sequel, The Trial of Billy Jack, he received a co-starring part where he spoke about and demonstrated the art, mentioning the art by name for the first time.

Han studied and refined this Korean martial art for more than 60 years. He was not a direct high level student of Grandmaster Yong-sul Choi but created and crafted his own limited version from various other teachers that he expanded and taught throughout the world.

=== Kim Jung-soo ===
Kim Jung-soo (김정수) was born and raised in the Taegu area, Korea, and started training Hapkido directly under Choi Yong-sool (최용술) in 1957. He was one of the earlier students of Hapkido, and one source puts him as the eight original student of Choi Yong-sool. Kim Jung-soo trained sporadically under Choi Yong-sool (최용술) along with his primary teachers and influencers Kim Moo-hong (김무홍) and Won Kwang-wha (원광화) from 1957 until 1986.

In 1961, Kim Moo-hong (김무홍) moved to Seoul to open a dojang, and Kim Jung-soo (김정수) and Won Kwang-wha (원광화) went with him and became his dojang's primary instructors. Together, they developed the Shin Moo Kwan (신무관) branch of Hapkido. In 1963 Kim Jung-soo (김정수) decided to go his own way and opened his own dojang in Taegu under the banner of Yun Bee Kwan (윤비관). Later, his students began opening branch schools throughout the greater Taegu aerea, under various names, but still considered to be part of the Yun Bee Kwan (윤비관) family. These schools are known to hold tightly to the original teachings of Choi, Yong-sool (김정수), while also including most of the refinements done by Kim Moo-hong (김무홍) in terms of kicking methods.

Kim Jung-soo (김정수) is mostly known for being the founder and president of the Korea-based World Hapkido General Federation, also known as World Hapkido Federation, collecting most of the schools under the Yun Bee Kwan (윤비관) lineage in one federation. This organization has since expanded worldwide. While having a similar name, this organization is not to be confused with the U.S. based World Hapkido Federation founded by Kwang Sik Myung (광시숭).

Kim Jung-soo is currently teaching from his dojang in Taegu City, South Korea.

=== Myung Jae-nam ===
In 1972, Myung Jae-nam (명재남) was one of the original members of the Korea Hapkido Association (대한 합기도 협회), which was formed in 1965 at the request of the South Korean President Park Jeong-hee. The Korea Hapkido Association was formed with the assistance of Park Jong-kyu, who was the head of the Presidential Protective Forces and one of the most powerful men in Korea at the time.

Myung Jae-nam exchanged martial art techniques and information with an Aikido practitioner named Hirata in 1965, for a period of about four years and included many aikido-like techniques into his version of hapkido. He has produced Several books and videos on the subject of hapkido self-defense. Later Myung Jae-nam broke away from all the other organizations and started to focus on promoting a new style, hankido. Until his death in 1999 he was the leader of the International Hapkido Federation.

=== Lee Chong-min ===
Chong-min Lee was born and raised in Seoul, Korea. He began his study of hapkido as a teenager and continued studying hapkido throughout his life though not a direct student of the late Grandmaster Yong-sool Choi. He is a self-promoted 9th Degree Black Belt, the Master Instructor of Hapkido Center, President of The World Hapkido Association.

Lee served as an Instructor with the 1st Special Forces Group in the Korean Army, and has taught martial arts to the Police Departments in Seoul as well as Plainfield, New Jersey. He has also served as the director of Hapkido demonstrations for such dignitaries as Hubert H. Humphrey and the Chancellor of the Republic of China, Mr. Chang, during their visits to Seoul, Korea. Lee came to the United States in June 1980. He currently operates a Hapkido Center in Warren, New Jersey, and is also a member of the Law Enforcement Officers Association New Jersey State. He has been instructing students for over 42 years in hapkido.

=== Kim Myung-Yong ===
Kim Myung-yong was born in Korea in 1942. He started at the age of 17 training at Seung Moo Kwan School under Grandmaster Ji Han-jae. He was a hapkido instructor in the military camp of Wang Shim Ri. His style of Hapkido Jin Jung Kwan has locations all over the world and is one of the largest hapkido styles practiced.

=== Kim Yun-sik ===
Kim Yun-sik (김윤식) was born in Seoul in 1943. He is the founder of Bum Moo Kwan Hapkido. He began his martial arts training in 1954 under the direction of Choi Yong-sool, and received the black belt from Choi in 1957. That same year, he received the black belt in Tang Soo Do from Grandmaster Hwang Kee.

Kim is the founder of the Bum Moo Kwan style, in which the practitioner is instructed to finish the encounter quickly, using any available material as weapon or any part of his body, aiming the opponent's pressure or vital points. Bum Moo is one of the three original and government regulated Hapkido Kwans.

Residing, teaching and training in Brazil since 1977, Kim was the master of several Hapkido World Champions, such as Norberto Serrano Jr., Rafael Tercarolli and Leandro Heck Gemeo.

=== Lim Chae-kwan ===
Grandmaster Lim Chae-kwan is the founder of Jin Mu Kwan. The Jin Mu Kwan (Jin: "authentic, true"; Mu: "martial"; Kwan: "school or training hall") is a traditional art of hapkido.

This school was founded by Grandmaster Lim Chae-kwan in 2007 after many years of research and study into the Hapkido of Founder Choi Young-sul. As a high school student, Lim, Chea-kwan began his Hapkido training under Grand Master Lim, Hyun-soo. Through the courtesy of his teacher at that time Grand Master Lim, Hyun-soo, president of the Jung Ki-kwan, he obtained a 4th dan certificate signed by Founder Choi Yong-sul. Since Choi's death in 1986 GM Lim studied with the top students of Founder Choi. Some of these Grandmasters were GM Jun Jeong-pil (kicking), GM Lee Jae-young (advanced wrist technology), GM Lee Young-hee (clothing grab defense), GM Chae Hung-jun (special offensive techniques for joint locking and throwing), GM Kim Yeong-jae (special self-protection techniques).

GM Lim Chae-kwan studied Founder Choi’s Hapkido style and, recognizing its level, trained throughout his life to become a skilled Hapkido practitioner.

== Principles ==
On the "hard-soft" scale of martial arts, hapkido stands somewhere in the middle, employing "soft" techniques similar to jujutsu and aikido as well as "hard" techniques reminiscent of taekwondo and tang soo do. Even the "hard" techniques, though, emphasize circular rather than linear movements. Hapkido is an eclectic, hybrid martial art, and different hapkido schools emphasize different techniques. However, some core techniques are found in each school (kwan), and all techniques should follow the three principles of hapkido:

- Harmony or blending principle (화; 和; hwa)
- Circle principle (원; 圓; won)
- Flowing or water principle (유; 류; 流; yu; ryu)

Hwa, or harmony, is simply the act of remaining relaxed and not directly opposing an opponent's force. For example, if an opponent were to push against a hapkido practitioner's chest, rather than resist and push back, the hapkido practitioner would blend with the opponent, avoiding any direct confrontation by moving in the same direction as the push and utilizing the opponent's forward momentum to execute a throw. Thus, this principle is largely based on energy conservation, allowing the hapkido practitioner to remain strong and fresh while his opponent becomes tired throughout the conflict.

Won, the circle principle, is a way to gain momentum for executing the techniques in a natural and free-flowing manner (much like being swept up in a vortex). If an opponent attacks in a linear motion, as in a punch or knife thrust, the hapkido practitioner would redirect the opponent's force by leading the attack in a circular pattern, thereby adding the attacker's power to his own. Once he has redirected that power, the hapkido practitioner can then execute any of a variety of techniques to incapacitate his attacker. The hapkido practitioner must learn to view an attacker as an "energy entity" rather than as a physical entity. The bigger the person is, the more energy a person has, and the better it is for the hapkido practitioner. Additionally, these circular motions are not limited to mere circles but can also take on spiral or even helical formations, which further serve to confound your adversaries.

Yu, the water principle, is analogous to the concept of a "moving target" wherein the saying, "In regards to a stream, you can't step on the same water twice," the current forever moves the water downstream and that persistent flow can erode away just about anything, even a boulder, which is often perceived as a substance that's "stronger" than water. Hapkido is fluid and does not rely on brute force against force. Rather it is much like water as an adaptable entity, in that a hapkido master will attempt to deflect an opponent's strike in a way that is similar to free-flowing water being divided around a stone, only to return and envelop it.

== Techniques ==
Hapkido seeks to be a fully comprehensive fighting style and as such tries to avoid narrow specialization in any particular type of technique or range of fighting. It maintains a wide range of tactics for striking, standing joint locks, throwing techniques (both pure and joint manipulating throws) and pinning techniques. Because of Judo's influence, Hapkido traditionally incorporate tactics for grappling and ground fighting, which consists of defense from reclining position and seated position (called Wa Uul and Jwa Sul respectively). Although, these tactics generally tend to be focused upon escaping and regaining footing or controlling, striking, and finishing a downed opponent, rather than lengthy wrestling or submission grappling engagements. Traditionally, these techniques were often practiced not in sparring but in self-defense forms.

The Korean term for technique is sool (Korean: 술; Hanja: 術; RR: sul). As terminology varies between schools, some refer to defensive maneuvers as soolgi (술기; loosely translated as "technique-ing"), while hoshinsool (Korean: 호신술; Hanja: 護身術; RR: hosinsul; meaning "self-defense") is preferred by others.

Proper hapkido tactics include using footwork and a series of kicks and hand strikes to bridge the distance with an opponent. Then to immediately control the balance of the opponent (typically by manipulating the head and neck), for a take down or to isolate a wrist or arm and apply a joint twisting throw, depending upon the situation; Hapkido is a comprehensive system and once the opponent's balance has been taken, there are myriad techniques to disable and subdue the opponent.

Hapkido makes use of pressure points known in Korean as hyeol (Korean: 혈; Hanja: 穴) which are also used in traditional Asian medical practices such as acupuncture point. These pressure points are either struck to produce unconsciousness or manipulated to create pain allowing one to more easily upset the balance of one's opponent prior to a throw or joint manipulation.

Hapkido emphasizes self-defense over sport fighting and as such employs the use of weapons, including environmental weapons of opportunity, in addition to empty hand techniques. Some schools also teach hyeong (Korean: 형; Hanja: 型), the Korean equivalent of what is commonly known as "kata" (or "forms") in Japanese martial arts.

=== Kicking ===
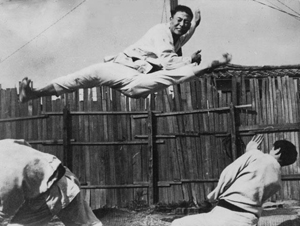
A bidirectional kick

The wide variety of kicks in hapkido make it distinctly Korean. Taekwondo kicks appear to be similar to many of the kicks found in hapkido, though again circular motion is emphasized. Also, in contrast to most modern taekwondo styles, hapkido utilises a wide variety of low (below the waist), hooking or sweeping kicks, with one of the most distinctive being the low spinning (sweeping) heel kick.

Hapkido's method of delivery tends toward greater weight commitment to the strikes and less concern for quick retraction of the kicking leg. Traditionally, Choi Yong-sool's yu kwon sool (Korean: 유권술; Hanja: 柔拳術; RR: yugwonsul) kicking techniques were only to the lower body, but most derived varieties of hapkido, probably as a direct influence from other Korean arts, also include high kicks and jumping kicks. At the more advanced levels of Hapkido the practitioner learns "blade kicks" which utilize sweeping blade strikes of the inner and outer foot against pressure points of the body.

Two of the earliest innovators in this regard were Ji Han-jae and Kim Moo-hong, both of whom were exposed to what were thought to be indigenous Korean kicking arts. They combined these forms together with the yu sool concepts for striking taught to them by Choi and during a period of 8 months training together in 1961 finalized the kicking curriculum which would be used by the Korea Hapkido Association for many years to come.

Other influences also were exerted on the kicking techniques of important hapkido teachers. Kwon Tae-man (권태만) initially studied under Ji Han-jae before immigrating to southern California in the United States. Han Bong-soo studied under Gwonbeop (Korean: 권법; Hanja: 拳法) and Shūdōkan karate from Yoon Byung-in (윤병인), whose students were influential in the later forming of Kong Soo Do and Taekwondo styles, specifically the Chang Moo Kwan and Jidokwan. He, like Kim Moo-hong, also trained briefly in the Korean art of Taekkyon under Lee Bok-yong (이복용).

Many other teachers like Myung Kwang-sik (명광식), Jeong Kee-tae (정기태), Lim Hyun-soo (임현수), and many others trained in tang soo do and kong soo do, Shotokan and Shūdōkan karate based systems which predated and influenced the forming of first tae soo do and later modern taekwondo styles.

Kim Sang-cook states that while many of the original yu kwon sool students were exposed to many different contemporary Korean arts the Chung Do Kwan was of particular importance in the transition from the original jujutsu based form to what we know today as modern hapkido.

Most forms of hapkido include a series of double kicks used to promote balance, coordination and muscular control.

An example of a double kick set:

- Front kick
- Side kick
- Front kick
- Back kick ("turning back-side kick")
- Front kick
- Roundhouse kick
- Front heel/hook kick
- Roundhouse kick
- Inverted low side kick
- High side kick
- Inside crescent kick/outside crescent kick (or heel-down/axe-kick for both)
- Side kick (or inside heel-down kick and side kick)
- Outside heel-down kick
- Roundhouse kick
- Ankle scoop kick
- Side kick
- Cover kick
- Front kick
- Inside heel hooking-the-thigh kick
- Front kick
- High spinning heel kick
- Low spinning heel kick
- Inside footblade kick
- Outside footblade kick
- Outside heel-down kick
- Roundhouse kick

After these kicks are mastered using one foot. The student moves on to jumping versions, alternating the kicking legs.

Kim Chong-sung (김종성, Jang Mu Won Hapkido Founder) was one of the oldest living active hapkido instructors, who maintains that the source of these kicking methods is from the indigenous Korean kicking art of Taekkyon. Others feel that these kicks are more representative of kong soo do and tang soo do styles which emerged from an adaptation of Japanese karate forms.

=== Hand strikes ===
Like most martial arts, hapkido employs a great number of punches and hand strikes, as well as elbow strikes. A distinctive example of hapkido hand techniques is "live hand" strike that focuses energy to the baek hwa hyul in the hand, producing energy strikes and internal strikes. The hand strikes are often used to weaken the opponent before joint locking and throwing, and also as finishing techniques.

Hand striking in hapkido (unless in competition) is not restricted to punches and open hand striking; some significance is given to striking with fingernails at the throat and eyes; pulling at the opponent's genitals is also covered in conventional training.

In order to recall hand strikes more easily in an emotionally charged situation, beginning students are taught conventional, effective patterns of blocks and counter-attacks called makko chigi (막고 치기), which progress to more complex techniques as the student becomes familiar with them.

=== Joint manipulation techniques ===
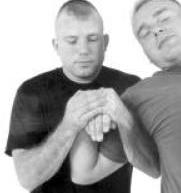
A hyperflexing wristlock used as a pain compliance technique

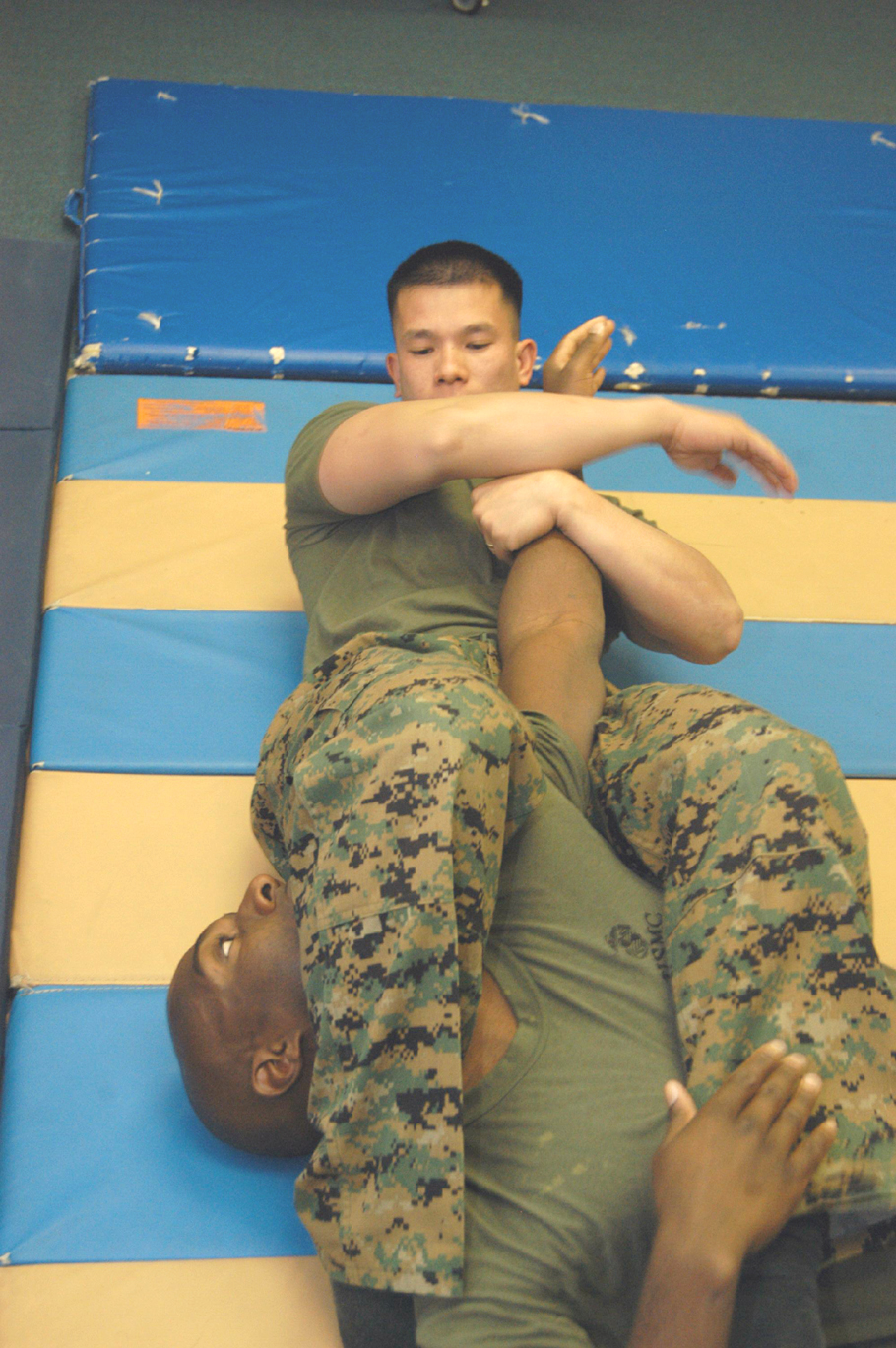
The straight armlock is an example of a very effective elbowlock.

Many of hapkido's joint control techniques are said to be derived largely from Daitō-ryū Aiki-jūjutsu. They are taught similarly to Aikido and Ju Jutsu techniques, but in general the circles are smaller and the techniques are applied in a more linear fashion. Hapkido's joint manipulation techniques attack both large joints (such as the elbow, shoulder, neck, back, knee, and hip) and small joints (such as wrists, fingers, ankles, toes, and jaw).

Most techniques involve applying force in the direction that a joint moves naturally and then forcing it to overextend or by forcing a joint to move in a direction that goes against its natural range of motion. These techniques can be used to cause pain and force a submission, to gain control of an opponent for 'come along' techniques (as is often employed in law enforcement), to assist in a hard or gentle throw or to cause the dislocation or breaking of the joint. Hapkido differs from some post-war styles of Aikido in its preservation of a great many techniques which are applied against the joint that were deemed by some to be inconsistent with Aikido's more pacifistic philosophy.

Wristlocks

Hapkido is well known for its use of a wide variety of wristlocks. These techniques are derived from Daitō-ryū Aiki-jūjutsu although their manner of performance is not always identical to that of the parent art. Still many of the techniques found in hapkido are quite similar to those of Daito-ryu and of Aikido, which was derived from that art. Examples of such techniques are: the supinating wristlock, pronating wristlock, internal rotational wristlock, and the utilization of pressure points on the wrist. These techniques are common to many forms of Japanese Jujutsu, Chinese chin na, and even "catch as catch can" wrestling.

Elbowlocks

Although well known for its wristlocking techniques, Hapkido has an equally wide array of tactics which center upon the manipulation of the elbow joint (see armlock). The first self-defense technique typically taught in many hapkido schools is the knife-hand elbow press. This technique is thought to be derived from Daitō-ryū's ippondori, a method of disarming and destroying the elbow joint of a sword-wielding opponent. Hapkido typically introduces this technique off a wrist-grabbing attack where the defender makes a circular movement with his hands to free himself from the opponent's grasp and applies a pronating wristlock while cutting down upon the elbow joint with their forearm, taking their opponent down to the ground, where an elbow lock is applied with one's hand or knee to immobilize the attacker in a pin. Both Daito-ryu and Aikido prefer to use hand pressure on the elbow throughout the technique rather than using the forearm as a "hand blade (Korean: 수도; Hanja: 手刀)", cutting into the elbow joint, in the Hapkido manner.

=== Throwing techniques ===
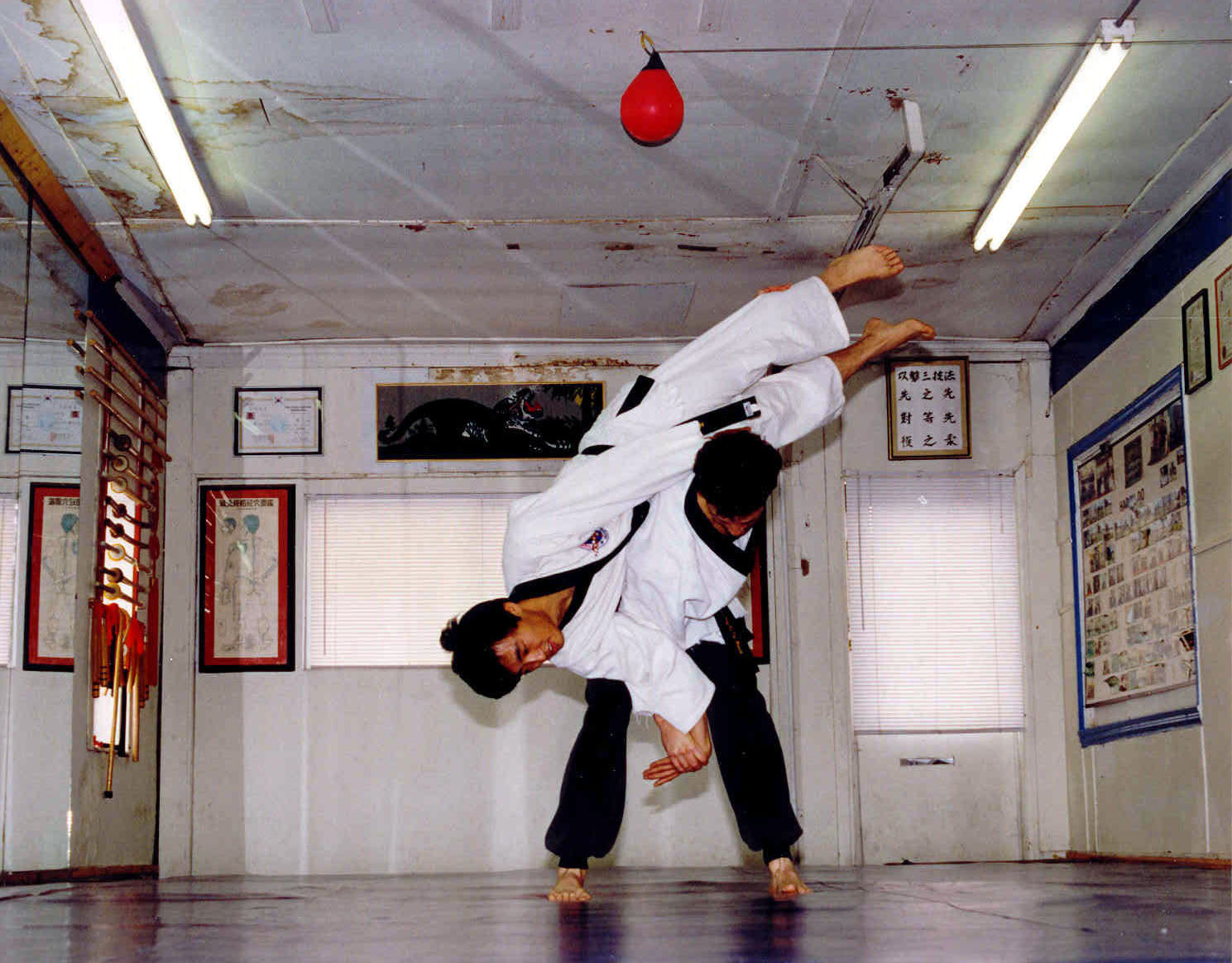
Hapkido students practice throws and joint manipulation in a dojang.

In addition to throws which are achieved by unbalancing one's opponent through the twisting of their joints, hapkido also contains techniques of pure throwing which do not require the assistance of jointlocks. Some of these techniques are found within Daito-ryu but a great many of them are held in common with judo (pronounced "yudo 유도" in Korean). Many of early practitioners of hapkido had extensive judo backgrounds including Choi Yong-sool's first student Seo Bok-seob.

Judo techniques were introduced in the early years of the 20th century in Korea during the Japanese colonial period. Judo tactics employ extensive use of throws, various chokes, hold downs, joint locks, and other grappling techniques used to control the opponent on the ground. It is believed that these techniques were absorbed into the hapkido curriculum from judo as there were a great many judo practitioners in Korea at that time and its tactics were commonly employed in the fighting of the period. Indeed, there also exists a portion of the hapkido curriculum which consists of techniques specifically designed to thwart judo style attacks.

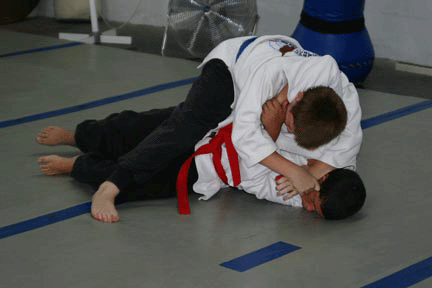
Hapkido practitioners perform grappling techniques.

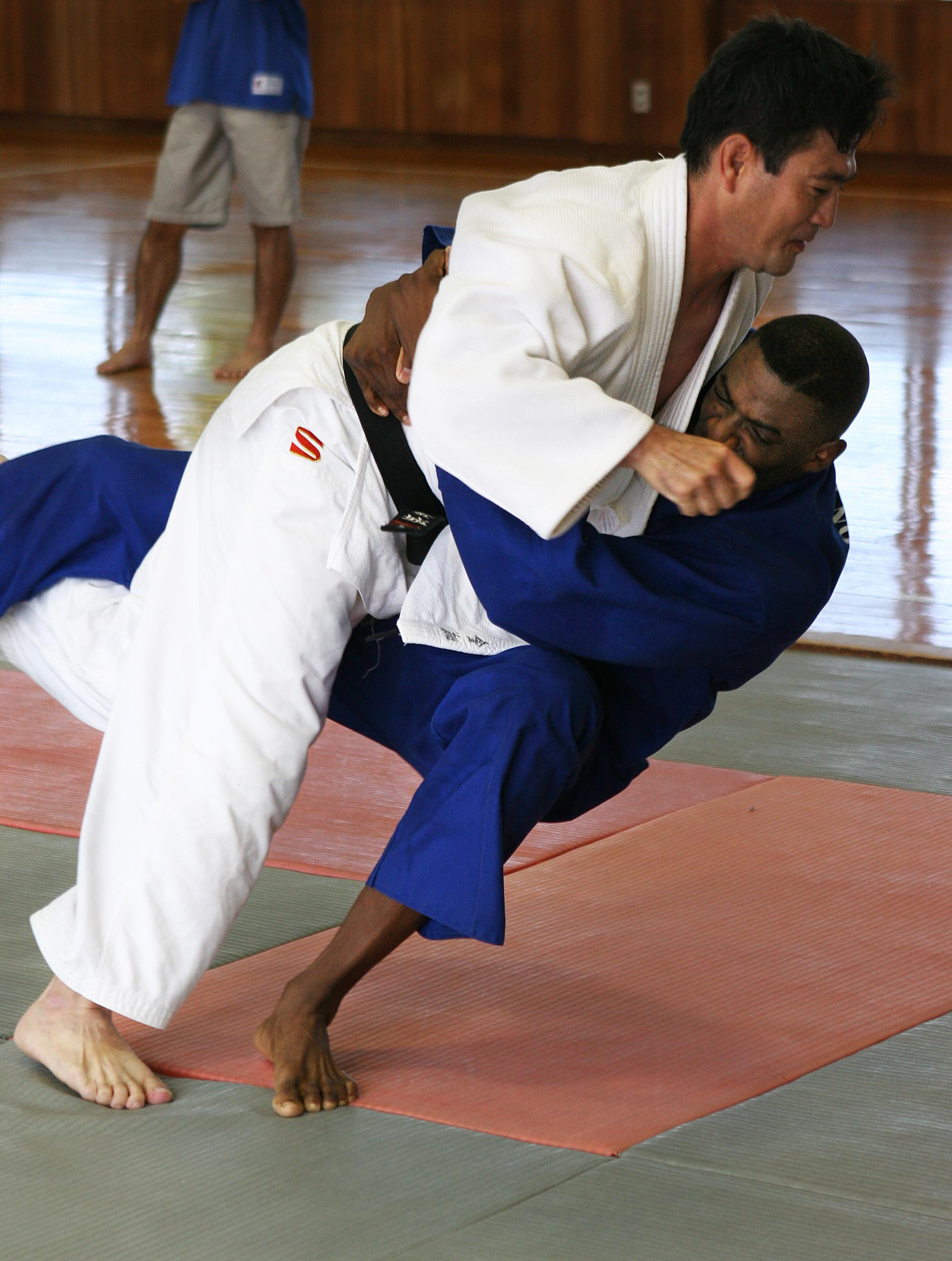
Hapkido holds many throwing techniques in common with judo.

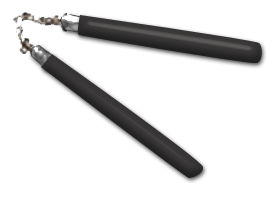
Nunchaku (Ssahng Jol Gohn; 쌍절곤), one of the hapkido weapons

The judo techniques were however adopted with adjustments made to make them blend more completely with the self-defence orientation which hapkido stresses. For example, many of the judo style throwing techniques employed in hapkido do not rely upon the use of traditional judo grips on the uniform, which can play a large role in the Japanese sport. Instead in many cases they rely upon gripping the limbs, head or neck in order to be successful.

Even today Korea remains one of the strongest countries in the world for the sport of judo and this cross influence on the art of Korean hapkido to be felt in Hapkido-influenced styles such as GongKwon Yusul (공권유술).

=== Weapons ===
As a hapkido student advances through the various belt levels (essentially the same as other Korean arts, e.g. taekwondo), he or she learns how to employ and defend against various weapons. The first weapon encountered is most often a knife (칼; kal). Another initial weapon used to teach both control and the basic precepts of utilizing a weapon with Hapkido techniques is the Tan Bong (police baton sized stick), techniques and defenses against the 35 cm short stick (단봉; 短棒; danbong), a walking stick or cane (지팡이; jipangi), and a rope are introduced in hapkido training. Many hapkido organisations may also include other weapons training such as a sword (검; geom), long staff (장봉; 長棒; jangbong), choong bong length staff, nunchaku (쌍절곤; 雙節棍; ssangjeolgon), war-fan or other types of bladed weapons such as twin short swords. Some schools even teach students to defend against firearms. Hapkido weapons techniques are often incorporated into many military and law enforcement training curricula.

== Training ==
Hapkido training takes place in a dojang. While training methods vary, a typical training session will contain technique practice (striking techniques as well as defensive throws and grappling), break falling (낙법; 落法; nakbeop), sparring, meditation and exercises to develop internal energy (기; 氣; gi).

Hapkido is predominantly a "soft" art, but this does not mean that it is easier on the opponent, or that training is easier (see Hard and soft (martial arts)). Hapkido training is vigorous and demanding. The practitioner could benefit in training by being lean and muscular. However, strength is not a prerequisite of hapkido; what strength and fitness is necessary to perform the techniques develops naturally as a result of training.

The following is an example of the Korea Hapkido Association technical requirements from 1st degree to 5th degree Black Belt as recorded by Hae-young Kim in 1991, created in association with Ji Han-jae. These techniques are now considered pre-dan level.

1st Degree Black Belt

- Single Kicks
- Wrist Seize Defense
- Clothing Seize Defense
- Punch Defense
- Kick Defense
- Combination Kicks
- Jumping Kicks
- Throw Defense
- Knife Defense
- Attacking Techniques / Taking the Initiative

2nd Degree Black Belt

- Advanced Wrist Grab Defense
- Advanced Clothing Grab Defense
- Advanced Punch Defense
- Advanced Kick Defense
- Choke Defense
- Advanced Attacking Techniques / Taking the Initiative
- Special Kicks
- Defense From A Sitting Or Lying Posture

3rd Degree Black Belt

- Joint locking Counters
- Short Stick Techniques
- Staff Techniques

4th Degree Black Belt

- Cane Techniques
- Sword Techniques
- Defense Against Multiple Attackers

5th Degree Black Belt

- Techniques Using Opponent's Force
- Rope Techniques
- Knife Throwing Techniques
- Revival Techniques

== Major organizations ==
- Tong Hap Kwan Hoshinsul Union (THKHU) - 2023
- Korea Hapkido Federation (KHF) - 1965
- International Taekwon-Do Federation (ITF) - 1966
- World Hapkido Federation (WHF) - 1973
- World Hapkido Headquarters / Hapkidowon (WHH) - 1981
- Kerekwan Hapkido Hosinsul India (KKHHI) Founded by Tiger Nasim Khan- 2000
- World Hapkido Confederation (WHC) - 2004 - Joint to TAFISA in 2010
- Global Hapkido Federation (GHF) - 2013
- Global Hapkido Association (GHA) - 2013

== See also ==
- Aiki (martial arts principle)
- Ju Jutsu
