= Korea Hapkido Federation =

South Korean martial arts organization

Korean name
- Hangul: 대한합기도협회
- Hanja: 大韓合氣道協會
- Revised Romanization: Daehan Hapgido Hyeophoe
- McCune–Reischauer: Taehan Hapkido Hyŏphoe

The Korea Hapkido Federation is the largest, wholly hapkido, governing body for the Korean martial art of hapkido in the world. It is made up of predominantly Korean born students and instructors or those individuals who have directly trained in South Korea. This organization is based in Seoul, South Korea and its president is Oh Se-Lim.

== Founder ==
Ji Han Jae was the founder of the original Korea Hapkido Association (Dae Han Hapkido Hyub Hoe) in 1965. The first president of the Dae Han Hapkido Hyub Hoe was Park Jong-Kyu who was Head of Security Forces for the South Korean president. Later Kim Woo Joong, president of the Dae Woo company was elected president of the KHA. These political connections greatly increased the association's power and influence. The prime movers in this organization were members of Ji's original 'Sung Moo Kwan'.

The KHA later grew into the Republic of Korea Hapkido Association (Dae Han Min Gook Hyub Hoe) with the merging of Ji han Jae's 'Dae Han Hapkido Hyub Hoe', Kim Moo-Hong's 'Han Gook Hapkido Hyub Hoe' (Korean Hapkido Association) and Myung Jae Nam's 'Han Gook Hapki Hoe' (Korean Hapki Association) in 1973. Choi Dae-Hoon was elected president of the association with Ji Han Jae serving as senior vice president.

By 1983, Oh, See Lim, with many of the original founding members of the association departing, renamed the association by the first organizational name used by Ji, the Dae Han Hapkido Hyub Hoe. With a new preferred English rendering, the new Korea Hapkido Federation was born.

== Prominent members ==
The following notable Hapkido figures have been historically registered or affiliated with the Korea Hapkido Federation and hold their own encyclopedic entries:

- Oh Se-lim – Longtime Grandmaster and President of the Korea Hapkido Federation.
- Myung Kwang-sik – Prominent early director within the federation's predecessor organization before founding the World Hapkido Federation.
- Scott Shaw – American martial artist and author registered with the federation.

== Recognized Kwans ==
Historically, the consolidation of the Korea Hapkido Federation relied on specific traditional schools (*kwans*) that formed its organizational and technical foundation. The historically documented foundational kwans deeply tied to the federation's lineage include:

- Bum Moo Kwan – Founded by Kim Yun-sik, historically recognized as one of the core schools integrated into the federation's foundational structure.
- Jin Jung Kwan – Founded by Kim Myung-yong, a prominent traditional school whose global leadership has historically served as regional directors for the federation.
- Sung Moo Kwan – Founded by Ji Han-jae, widely regarded as the central foundational dojang where the core technical curriculum of the federation's predecessor organizations was established.

== See also ==
- Korean martial arts
