= Myung Kwang-sik =

South Korean hapkidoin (1940–2009)

- Hangul: 명광식
- RR: Myeong Gwangsik
- MR: Myŏng Kwangsik

Myung Kwang-sik (Korean: 명광식; 2 April 1940 – 19 July 2009) was an early Korean hapkido practitioner and a pioneer of the art, first in Korea and then in the United States. He was the second student of Ji Han Jae's school in Ma Jang Dong, Seoul. He formed the first worldwide organization for hapkido, the World Hapkido Federation, and wrote comprehensive books on the art.

== Accomplishments ==
One of the earliest important pioneers of the art, Myung Kwang-sik first began teaching hapkido at the Northern Branch of the Korea Hapkido Association in Seoul while attending Sung Kyun Kwan University as a Commerce Major. It was after graduation that Myung was awarded the directorship of the Northern Branch Dochang of Hapkido. The Korea Hapkido Association sent 15 members of demonstration teams to Vietnam and taught Korean, US, and Vietnamese troops as well as Special Forces. Upon returning to Seoul Myung opened up a school in the Sansunkyo district and established the Korea Hapkido Yon Moo Kwan Association in April 1968, dedicated to the furtherance of Hapkido as a highly visible martial art. In 1967 he published a 254-page, Korean-language book, “Hapkido,” at the age of 27. This was later followed by the first major Hapkido book in English, "Hapkido - Ancient Art of Masters" (October, 1976).

== Personal life ==
He later moved to Detroit where he opened up his first hapkido school and formed the World Hapkido Association. Shortly thereafter in 1976 he published one of the first and most detailed books on hapkido technique in English available to that time, improving upon the material from the book he had published earlier in Korea. Myung later moved his headquarters to Los Angeles and established the World Hapkido Federation. Myung produced and published a vast series of Hapkido video tapes and books while in Los Angeles and later at the World Hapkido Federation World Headquarters in Tustin, California.

== Published works ==
- Myung, Kwang-sik. Korean Hapkido; Ancient Art of Masters. World Hapkido Federation. Los Angeles, California, 1976.
- Myung, Kwang-sik. Hapkido: Special Self Protection Techniques. Seolim Publishing Co. Seoul, 1993.
- Myung, Kwang-sik. Hapkido Textbook; Vols. 1-6; Seolim Publishing Co. Seoul, 1998.
- Myung, Kwang-sik. Hapkido Weapons Volume 2 - The Cane; Sam Mun Printing Company, Seoul, 1988.
- Myung, Kwang-sik. Hapkido Weapons Volume 3 - The Forms; Sam Mun Printing Company, Seoul, 1988.

== Instructional videos ==
Video Instruction 1 - 32 Covering From White Belt to 7th Dan Techniques

== References and further reading ==
- Kimm, He-young. Hapkido II. Andrew Jackson Press, Baton Rouge, Louisiana 1994.

== See also ==
- Korean martial arts
- Hapkido
