= Ben Shockley =

English actor (born 1965)

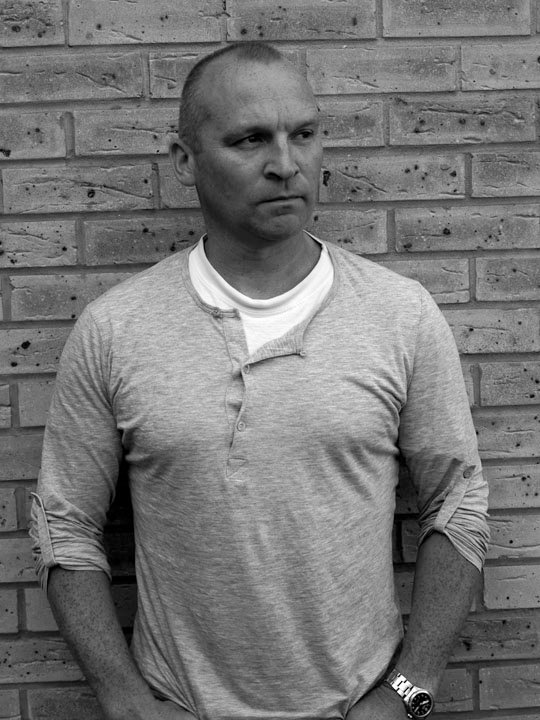
- Shockley relaxing between takes
- Born: David White; 3 February 1965 (age 61); Hythe, Kent, England
- Occupation: Actor
- Website: www.benshockley.yolasite.com

Ben Shockley (born 3 February 1965) is an English actor.

== Early life ==
Shockley (born David White) grew up in Hythe, Kent. He is the son of Alan Richard White (deceased) and Elsie Alice White.

== Career ==
Shockley has appeared in films such as On the Ropes, Ten Dead Men and Bad Day.

In 2011, Shockley was interviewed for the book, The Good Bad Guys.

Ink Pixel Films released a video in July 2012 featuring Shockley and British director Mark Noyce. During the discussion it was revealed that filming had begun on the comedy This is Jade (AKA The One Hit Wonder). It was also revealed that the two were collaborating on The Blazing Cannon's.

== Filmography ==
=== Film ===
Year	Film	Role	Notes
1986	Lady Jane	Peasant	uncredited
1988	Journey’s End (TV)	Private Evans	uncredited
1989	Driven	Andrew Harris	uncredited
1998	Sugar Sugar	Drunk boyfriend	uncredited
1999	All the King's Men	Neil Marklew	
2000	Esther Kahn	Stagehand	uncredited
2005	Left for Dead	Louis	
2005	Containment	Security guard	
2006	FiXers	Cox	
2006	King of London	Michael	
2006	A nearly silent film	John	
2006	House of Donn	David	
2006	The Liberator	The Engineer	
2006	Bloodmyth	Jim Brierley	
2006	Secret Thoughts of Angels	Dr. Crabtree	
2007	Missing Connection	James	
2007	Greetings	David	
2008	Inside Blue	Detective Kreeger	
2008	Crossed Lines	Len Nixon	
2008	Counterfeit Butterfly	Sean Valentine	
2008	Bad Day	Mr. Ward	
2008	Ten Dead Men	Keller	
2008	Cold Earth	Detective Constable Radcliffe	
2008	Dark Rage	Officer Dean	
2009	The Firm	Plain Clothes Detective	
2010	Hysterical Inevitability	Nick	
2010	The Oracle	Detective Kreeger	
2010	The Shouting Men	Graham	
2010	The 4th Wall	Mika	voice only
2010	London Boulevard	Detective	uncredited
2011	On the Ropes	Mick Western	
2011	Death	Yossarian Jones	
2011	Manor Hunt Ball	Pike	
2012	Shaniqua	Bill	
2013	This is Jayde: The One Hit Wonder	Barney Bennett	
2013	The Blazing Cannons	Steel	Also writer and producer
2019	Invasion Planet Earth	Billy McCoy	

=== Television ===
Year	Programme	Role	Notes
1989	Streetwise	Cycle Courier	
1990	The Bill	Actor	2 episodes
1990	Spatz	Protester	
