= Impact (action entertainment magazine) =

Magazine from the United Kingdom

- Editor: John Mosby & Mike Leeder
- Categories: Anime, Eastern and Action Movie Magazine
- Frequency: Monthly
- First issue: January 1992
- Final issue Number: January 2012; 241
- Company: MAI Publications
- Country: United Kingdom
- Website: https://www.impactonline.co
- ISSN: 0964-6957

Impact was a monthly magazine published in the United Kingdom between January 1992 and January 2012. Founded and initially edited by film maker Bey Logan, 241 issues were published during its twenty-year history.

After the magazine ceased publication, it continued as an online presence. It is probably modelled on its French counterpart, also known as Impact, which was started in 1986. It covers the field of action entertainment: including Hong Kong action cinema, worldwide martial arts films, Hollywood productions, anime, comics, action films and East Asian cinema in general. The website is edited by John Mosby, with Mike Leeder acting as Eastern Editor from the Hong Kong office, and Andrez Bergen as Tokyo Correspondent.

Filmmakers such as Phil Hobden (Left For Dead and Ten Dead Men) write regular articles for the magazine.
