= Steve Coleman (wushu) =

British Wushu athlete and actor

Personal information
- Born: 22 September 1981 (age 44) Kettering, England
- Education: BA Acting; University of Northampton
- Occupations: Martial artist, athlete, coach, actor, stuntman
- Years active: 1998-present

Sport
- Sport: Wushu
- Position: Captain (2005-2023)
- Events: Changquan, Daoshu, Jianshu, Gunshu
- Team: Great Britain Wushu Team
- Coached by: Mike Donoghue
Medal record
Representing United Kingdom
Men's Wushu Taolu
European Championships
Gold medal – first place	2014 Bucharest	Daoshu
Gold medal – first place	2016 Moscow	Gunshu
Silver medal – second place	2008 Warsaw	Jianshu
Silver medal – second place	2014 Bucharest	Changquan
Bronze medal – third place	2010 Antalya	Changquan
Bronze medal – third place	2014 Bucharest	Gunshu
Bronze medal – third place	2016 Moscow	Changquan
Bronze medal – third place	2016 Moscow	Daoshu
Bronze medal – third place	2018 Moscow	Gunshu

Steven Roy Coleman (born 22 September 1981) is a British Wushu athlete and actor. He is a two-time European wushu champion having been the second gold medallist for Great Britain in daoshu and gunshu behind Ray Park, and is a multiple-time medallist at the European Wushu Championships. Coleman has also won the Great Britain National Wushu Championships multiple times and has broken and set many Great Britain National Wushu records. He is said to have one of the longest competitive wushu careers, having competed internationally for over twenty years.

== Career ==
=== Early career ===
Coleman began martial arts at the age of nine by practising Shotokan Karate. He trained and competed in Karate and earned a blackbelt at the age of thirteen. From 1991 to 1994 he was a junior Karate Kata champion and in 1994 was a national champion.

In 1995, he turned his attention to Kung Fu and kickboxing. After a year of finding his direction in martial arts Coleman began training in London in wushu and Chin Woo, later complemented by training in sanda and gymnastics. He began to train in wushu around the world including in Great Britain under Mike Donoghue and at Ray Park's former school, as well as in Malaysia under Oh Poh Soon. In 2001 and 2002, Coleman won at the Traditional National Wushu Championships as well as at the 2002 Chin Woo World Championships

=== Wushu career ===
At 21, Coleman decided to focus strictly on Wushu. Training privately under Mike Donoghue, Steve went on to win the all-round National Wushu Championships in 2003 and consecutively every year since. This was added to with another World Chin Woo Championship win in 2006, various European Competition wins, and representation of the Great Britain Wushu Team.

Coleman made his wushu continental debut at the 2002 European Wushu Championships in Porto, Portugal and his international debut at the 2003 World Wushu Championships in Macau. He subsequently competed in the next few European and world championships, becoming the captain of the Great Britain Wushu Team in 2006. At the 2008 European championships in Warsaw, Coleman won the silver medal in jianshu, but did not compete the following year in the 2009 World Wushu Championships. A year later, he competed in the 2010 European Wushu Championships in Antalya and won a shared bronze medal in changquan. From 2011 to 2012, Coleman retired from competitive wushu.

In 2013, Coleman started competing in wushu again. A year later at the 2014 European Wushu Championships in Bucharest, he became the European champion in daoshu and won silver and bronze medals in changquan and gunshu respectively. He then returned to compete internationally at the 2015 World Wushu Championships in Jakarta with a 7th-place finish in daoshu. A year later, Coleman competed in the 2016 European Wushu Championships in Moscow and became the European champion in gunshu and won bronze medals in daoshu and gunshu. He returned to the European championships two years later also in Moscow and was a bronze medalist in gunshu. Later that year, he competed in the World Martial Arts Masterships in South Korea and finished 6th in gunshu. He then competed at the 2019 World Wushu Championships in Shanghai where he was the oldest competitor.

After the COVID-19 pandemic, Coleman returned to competition once again. His most recent competition was the 2023 World Wushu Championships in Fort Worth where he was once again the oldest competitor and competed with multiple injuries.

=== Acting career ===
His first television appearance was on a show called Masters of Combat, aired on BBC2 in 2001. This was later followed up with an appearance in a documentary This is Kung Fu, also shown on BBC2. In 2002, he appeared for the music video of Junkie XL vs Elvis Presley's "A Little Less Conversation" as a "kung fu" performer. In the 2011 film On The Ropes, Coleman appeared alongside Mark Noyce, Ben Shockley and others in a mockumentary style film about martial arts culture in the UK. Coleman has most recently appeared on 6 Underground, Mission: Impossible – Dead Reckoning Part One, and Accident Man: Hitman's Holiday among other films.

== Competitive history ==
=== Wushu ===
Year	Event	CQ	DS	JS	GS
2002	National Championships	2nd place, silver medalist(s)	2nd place, silver medalist(s)		2nd place, silver medalist(s)
2002	European Championships	7	8		12
2003	National Championships	1st place, gold medalist(s)		1st place, gold medalist(s)	1st place, gold medalist(s)
2003	World Championships	35		12	
2004	National Championships	1st place, gold medalist(s)		1st place, gold medalist(s)	1st place, gold medalist(s)
2004	European Championships	5		4	5
2005	National Championships	1st place, gold medalist(s)		1st place, gold medalist(s)	1st place, gold medalist(s)
2005	World Championships	15		15	19
2006	National Championships	1st place, gold medalist(s)		1st place, gold medalist(s)	1st place, gold medalist(s)
2006	European Championships	4		7	6
2007	National Championships	1st place, gold medalist(s)		1st place, gold medalist(s)	1st place, gold medalist(s)
2007	World Championships	35	37		37
2008	National Championships	1st place, gold medalist(s)		1st place, gold medalist(s)	1st place, gold medalist(s)
2008	European Championships	5		2nd place, silver medalist(s)	6
2009	National Championships	1st place, gold medalist(s)		1st place, gold medalist(s)	1st place, gold medalist(s)
2010	National Championships	1st place, gold medalist(s)		1st place, gold medalist(s)	1st place, gold medalist(s)
2010	European Championships	3rd place, bronze medalist(s)		4	DNS
2011	Retired				
2012	National Championships	1st place, gold medalist(s)	1st place, gold medalist(s)		1st place, gold medalist(s)
2013	National Championships	1st place, gold medalist(s)	1st place, gold medalist(s)		1st place, gold medalist(s)
2014	National Championships	1st place, gold medalist(s)	1st place, gold medalist(s)		1st place, gold medalist(s)
2014	European Championships	2nd place, silver medalist(s)	1st place, gold medalist(s)		3rd place, bronze medalist(s)
2015	National Championships	1st place, gold medalist(s)	1st place, gold medalist(s)		1st place, gold medalist(s)
2015	World Championships	7			11
2016	National Championships	1st place, gold medalist(s)	1st place, gold medalist(s)		1st place, gold medalist(s)
2016	European Championships	3rd place, bronze medalist(s)	3rd place, bronze medalist(s)		1st place, gold medalist(s)
2017	National Championships	1st place, gold medalist(s)	1st place, gold medalist(s)		1st place, gold medalist(s)
2018	National Championships	1st place, gold medalist(s)	1st place, gold medalist(s)		1st place, gold medalist(s)
2018	European Championships	4	DNS		3rd place, bronze medalist(s)
2018	World Martial Arts Masterships				6
2019	National Championships	1st place, gold medalist(s)	1st place, gold medalist(s)		1st place, gold medalist(s)
2019	World Championships	37			14
2020-22	Did not compete due to COVID-19 pandemic				
2023	World Championships	36	11		17

== Filmography ==
Year	Title	Role	Medium	Notes
2001	Masters of Combat	"Venomous Blade"	Television	
2002	"A Little Less Conversation"	"Kung Fu Guy"	Music Video	
2011	On the Ropes	Shane Powers		stunt coordinator, fight choreographer
2012	The Proxy	Trenchcoat #1	TV Series	
2014	Allies	German Ambush Soldier		
2017	The Real Target	Agent Double 0 Eight		
2017	"The Lost Sheep"	Alec	Short	stunt coordinator, fight choreographer
2018	"Chopsticks!!"	Foreign Fighter	Short	
2019	"Checkpoint"	Man	Short	
2019	Most Terrifying Places	Drakelow Explorer	TV Series	
2019	"The Adventurer's Diary"	Chauffer	Short	
2019	"10 Minutes for a Pound"		Short	assistant stunt coordinator
2019	6 Underground			stunt performer
2020	"Undercover"	McKenzie	Short	
2020	Badnaam			stunt performer
2022	The Woman King			combat trainer
2022	Accident Man: Hitman's Holiday			stunt double: Scott Adkins
2023	"Like Real Adults Do"	James	Short	
2023	Mission: Impossible – Dead Reckoning Part One			stunts
