= Pelé Reid =

English boxer

Personal information
- Born: Pelé Jerry Wabara Reid; 11 January 1973 (age 53) Solihull, England, UK
- Height: 6 ft 3 in (1.91 m)
- Weight: Heavyweight

Boxing career
- Stance: Orthodox

Boxing record
- Total fights: 28
- Wins: 20
- Win by KO: 17
- Losses: 6
- Draws: 2
- No contests: 0

Pelé Jerry Wabara Reid (born 11 January 1973) is a British former professional kickboxer and professional boxer who competed from 1995 to 2009.

== Early life ==
Reid is the son of the Nigerian footballer Lawrence Wabara, and was named after the Brazilian footballer Pelé. He is the half-brother of Mark Walters, and uncle of the footballer Reece Wabara.

== Kickboxing career ==
In November 1993, he took part in the world amateur championship of WAKO, held at Atlantic City, New Jersey. He defeated William Eves (USA) by KO with his back-spin-kick at the final match of 89 kg class.

Reid and Dutchman William van Roosmalen are the only men ever to knock out boxing champion Vitali Klitschko in a kickboxing match. Reid managed to knock him out with a spinning back kick to the jaw.

== Film work ==
In 2010, Reid was offered a role in the British comedy film On the Ropes. Director Mark Noyce chose Reid to fight Steve Coleman in a scene set at a martial arts competition.

In 2012, Reid teamed up with the trainer who worked with him for his British Masters title win at the company WBC Fight Club in his current home town of Chelmsley Wood. He offers motivational fitness training using his years of experience.

== Titles ==
Boxing

- 1997 W.B.O. Inter-Continental heavyweight title (1 title defence)
- 2009 British Masters Heavyweight title

Kickboxing

- 1993 W.A.K.O. World Championships in Atlantic City, USA (gold) +89 kg (Light-Contact)
- 1992 W.A.K.O. European Championships in Varna, Bulgaria (gold) +89 kg (Light-Contact)

== Professional boxing record ==
28 fights	20 wins	6 losses
By knockout	17	5
By decision	3	1
Draws	2	
No contests	0	

No.	Result	Record	Opponent	Type	Round, time	Date	Location	Notes
28	Win	20–6–2	(United Kingdom) David Ingleby	PTS	10	2009-03-07	(United Kingdom) New Bingley Hall, Birmingham, England	
27	Loss	19–6–2	(United Kingdom) Sam Sexton	UD	3	2008-09-12	(United Kingdom) Metro Radio Arena, Newcastle, England	Prizefighter II: heavyweight quarter-final
26	Loss	19–5–2	(United Kingdom) John McDermott	TKO	2 (10), 1:45	2008-04-18	(United Kingdom) York Hall, Bethnal Green, London, England	For vacant BBBofC English Heavyweight title.
25	Win	19–4–2	(United Kingdom) Chris Woollas	KO	1 (6), 1:33	2007-06-01	(United Kingdom) Holiday Inn, Birmingham, England	
24	Win	18–4–2	(Belarus) Raman Sukhaterin	PTS	6	2007-03-17	(United Kingdom) International Convention Centre, Birmingham, England	
23	Win	17–4–2	(United Kingdom) Paul King	TKO	6 (6), 0:23	2006-12-01	(United Kingdom) Aston Villa Leisure Centre, Birmingham, England	
22	Win	16–4–2	(Zambia) Joseph Chingangu	TKO	3 (10), 0:27	2002-10-15	(United Kingdom) York Hall, Bethnal Green, London, England	
21	Draw	15–4–2	(United Kingdom) Derek McCafferty	PTS	4	2002-09-06	(United Kingdom) York Hall, Bethnal Green, London, England	
20	Loss	15–4–1	(United Kingdom) Michael Sprott	TKO	7 (10), 2:53	2002-05-09	(United Kingdom) Equinox Nightclub, Leicester Square, London, England	For vacant WBF European Heavyweight title.
19	Draw	15–3–1	(United Kingdom) Luke Simpkin	PTS	4	2002-01-27	(United Kingdom) Caesars Nightclub, Streatham, London, England	
18	Win	15–3	(United Kingdom) Derek McCafferty	TKO	3 (6), 1:19	2001-12-13	(United Kingdom) Equinox Nightclub, Leicester Square, London, England	
17	Win	14–3	(United Kingdom) Mal Rice	PTS	4	2001-10-04	(United Kingdom) The Brewey Chiswell Street, Islington, London, England	
16	Loss	13–3	(Nigeria) Jacklord Jacobs	TKO	2 (6)	2000-01-22	(United Kingdom) Aston Villa Leisure Centre, Birmingham, England	
15	Loss	13–2	(United States) Orlin Norris	KO	1 (8), 1:31	1999-06-26	(United Kingdom) London Arena, Millwall, London, England	
14	Loss	13–1	(United Kingdom) Julius Francis	TKO	3 (12), 2:28	1999-01-30	(United Kingdom) York Hall, Bethnal Green, London, England	For BBBofC British Heavyweight title. For Commonwealth (British Empire) Heavyweight title.
13	Win	13–0	(Austria) Biko Botowamungu	RTD	3 (8), 3:00	1998-09-19	Arena Oberhausen, Oberhausen, Germany	
12	Win	12–0	(United Kingdom) Wayne Llewellyn	KO	1 (10), 2:06	1998-06-06	(United Kingdom) Everton Park Sports Centre, Liverpool, England	BBBofC British Heavyweight title eliminator.
11	Win	11–0	(United Kingdom) Albert Call	TKO	2 (8), 2:29	1997-11-15	(United Kingdom) Whitchurch Sports Centre, Bristol, England	
10	Win	10–0	(United States) Eli Dixon	KO	9 (12), 1:19	1997-10-11	(United Kingdom) Sheffield Arena, Sheffield, England	Retained WBO Inter-Continental Heavyweight title.
9	Win	9–0	(Jamaica) Ricardo Kennedy	TKO	1 (12), 2:43	1997-06-28	(United Kingdom) Sports Village, Norwich, England	Won vacant WBO Inter-Continental Heavyweight title.
8	Win	8–0	(United Kingdom) Michael Murray	TKO	1 (8), 0:09	1997-02-25	(United Kingdom) Hillsborough Leisure Centre, Sheffield, England	Fastest stoppage in British boxing history.
7	Win	7–0	(United States) Rick Sullivan	TKO	2 (6)	1996-11-02	Olympia Eisstadio, Garmisch-Partenkirchen, Germany	
6	Win	6–0	(Argentina) Eduardo Antonio Carranza	KO	2 (6)	1996-10-12	Forum, Assago, Milan, Italy	
5	Win	5–0	(United Kingdom) Andy Lambert	KO	1 (6)	1996-06-25	(United Kingdom) Mansfield Leisure Centre, Mansfield, England	
4	Win	4–0	(United Kingdom) Keith Fletcher	KO	1 (4)	1996-05-11	(United Kingdom) York Hall, Bethnal Green, London, England	
3	Win	3–0	(United Kingdom) Vance Idiens	TKO	1 (6), 0:53	1996-01-26	(United Kingdom) Hilton Brighton Metropole, Brighton, England	
2	Win	2–0	(United Kingdom) Joey Paladino	TKO	1 (6), 1:22	1996-01-20	(United Kingdom) Mansfield Leisure Centre, Mansfield, England	
1	Win	1–0	(United Kingdom) Gary Williams	TKO	1 (4)	1995-11-24	(United Kingdom) Bowlers Exhibition Centre, Manchester, England	Professional debut

== Professional kickboxing record (incomplete) ==
Kickboxing record (incomplete)
0 wins, 3 losses
Date	Result	Opponent	Event	Location	Method	Round	Time
2006-04-08	Loss	(Czech Republic) Petr Vondracek	K-1 Grand Prix 2006 in Milan	Milan, Italy	Decision	3	3:00
2004-04-24	Loss	(France) Grégory Tony	Pain and Glory	Birmingham, England	Decision (Unanimous)	3	3:00
2003-07-13	Loss	(Morocco) Aziz Khattou	K-1 World Grand Prix 2003 in Fukuoka	Fukuoka, Japan	TKO (Doctor Stoppage)	2	3:00
2003-06-14	Loss	(Germany) Chalid Arrab	K-1 World Grand Prix 2003 in Paris	Paris, France	Decision (Unanimous)	3	3:00
2003-03-30	Loss	(New Zealand) Ray Sefo	K-1 World Grand Prix 2003 in Saitama	Saitama, Japan	TKO (Corner Stoppage)	3	1:15
Legend: Win Loss Draw/No contest Notes

== Personal life ==
Reid is now a dedicated Jehovah's Witness. In 2019 he wed a fellow Jehovah's Witness at a ceremony in Birmingham.
