= Philippe Joly =

French actor and screenwriter (born 1976)

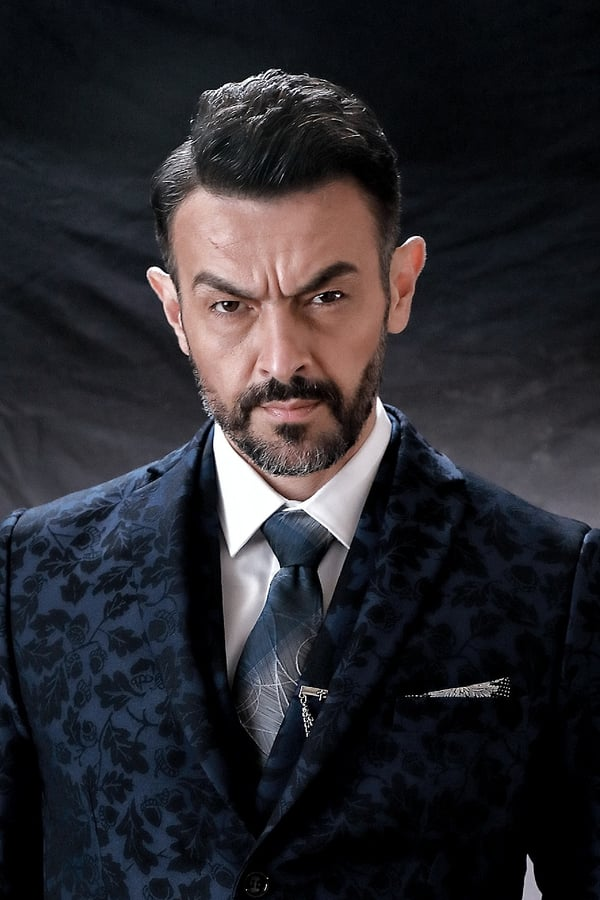
- Joly in 2017
- Born: 2 January 1976 (age 50); Moscow, Russia
- Occupations: Actor; screenwriter; producer; model
- Years active: 2010–present
- Height: 1.81 m (5 ft 11 in)

Philippe Joly (Chinese: 狼森; pinyin: Lángsēn) (born 2 January 1976) is a French actor and screenwriter, born in Moscow, Russia. Joly is best known for his role as Zoltan in the 2015 film Pound of Flesh with Jean-Claude Van Damme and his role as Decimus in Jackie Chan's film Dragon Blade directed by Daniel Lee, in which he appears alongside American actors John Cusack and Adrien Brody, and French singer/actress Lorie Pester.

Joly regularly plays the villain in Action films in Asia, and appeared alongside major Hong Kong actors including; Chow Yun Fat, and Andy Lau. Recent projects include Juno Mak's latest film Sons of the Neon Night (Chinese: 風林火山), and the Chinese Sci-fi action film Ultimate Code (Chinese: 终极代码) in which Joly plays a leading role as the main villain alongside a Chinese cast and fellow french actor and Parkour founder David Belle.

As well as acting, Joly has also written many screenplays, and produced and directed a few Independent films in Hong Kong. Joly speaks several languages (French, Russian, Italian and English), is an avid practitioner of close-up magic and card manipulation, and has trained in various Martial Arts since the age of 5. While not a stuntman, Joly often has to perform stunts as required by the Action film genre and the type of characters he plays. In the film Lust & Found, he choreographed the fight scene sequence.

== Filmography ==
=== Films ===
Year	Title	Chinese Title	Role	Notes
2023	Homeland Guardian	守城者	Louis	TV series directed by Su Wanchong and starring Jordan Chan and Simon Yam. Homeland Guardian distributed by iQiyi pays tribute to the Hong Kong Police and celebrates the 25th anniversary of Hong Kong's return to China.
2023	The Goldfinger	金手指	Head of KGB	Once Upon a Time in Hong Kong is an upcoming Hong Kong action crime thriller film written and directed by Felix Chong, and starring Andy Lau and Tony Leung. Set in the 1980s, the film is based on the story of Carrian Group, a Hong Kong corporation which rose rapidly before collapsing shortly afterwards due to a corruption scandal.
2020	The Modelizer (formerly Hong Kong Love Story)		Vadim	Romantic comedy starring Byron Mann, Dominika Kachlik, K-pop star and actor Nichkhun, Celinde Schoenmaker, Julia Nickson, Rayssa Bratillieri, Hana Hrzic, and legendary Hong Kong actor Kenneth Tsang. Directed by Keoni Waxman.
2020	Variant	星际变种	Joey	Chinese Science fiction adventure action production, directed by Qilin Li. Starring Jim Liu, Shuting Yang, Karl Dominik, Alex Zerrath, Eric Heise, Chelsey Mark
2020	The Ultimate Code	终极代码	Mick	Style: Action. Starring David Belle, Wu Zhiting and Meng Lu.
2020	Sons of the Neon Night	風林火山	Enzo	Style: Crime Drama Thriller. Director: Juno Mak. Starring Takeshi Kaneshiro, Tony Leung Ka-fai, Sean Lau, and Louis Koo.
2020	Battle of Defense 2	捍战2	General	Directed by Yunpeng Xie. With Robert Knepper and Zhaoqi Shi
2019	The White Storm 2 - Drug Lords	扫毒2天地对决	Jozsef	Starring Andy Lau, Louis Koo. Directed by Herman Yau. Winner of the Hong Kong Film Award for Best Visual Effects.
2019	Abduction (formerly Twilight Zodiac)	决战异世界 (also known as 生死鬼蜮)	Mogilov	Starring Scott Adkins, Andy On, Truong Ngoc-anh. Directed by Ernie Barbarash. Executive Producer Roger Corman for IQiyi, Producers Henry Luk and Mike Leeder.
2019	Change of Gangster	转型团伙	Gangster	Mob Comedy directed by Francis Ng. Starring Francis Ng, his son Feynman Ng, Simon Yam, Frankie Ng Chi-Hung, and Qiao Shan.
2019	Flying Tiger (season 2)	飛虎之雷霆極戰	MI6 Commander	Second season of the Hong Kong action-drama series Flying Tiger, which follows an elite Hong Kong police officer tasked with infiltrating a dangerous criminal organization. Starring Lee Pace
2018	Call Me Agent	我要做特務	Mafia Boss	Starring Cantopop singer Poyiu Wong (of the Hong Kong girl group Staries), Vincent Luk, Malaysian singer Belle Lee and veteran Hong Kong actor Gabriel Wong Yat San. Co-directed by Hong Kong director Eric Lam, who wrote the screenplay, and Malaysian director Michael Chuah, who also serves as producer.
2017	Captured		Jean-Pierre Bonnet	Director: Ross W. Clarkson. Starring Oliver Williams, Sara Malakul Lane, Katrina Grey, Andrew Ng, Emilie Guillot
2017	OCTB	反黑	Jay (George's henchman)	Director: Jones Soong (Chinese: 宋本中). Starring Jordan Chan, Danny Chan Kwok-kwan, Sam Lee, Michael Chan Wai-man, Frankie Ng Chi Hung.
2017	Chasing the Dragon	追龍	Chief Commissioner of Police	Directors: Jason Kwan, Wong Jing. Starring Donnie Yen and Andy Lau.
2017	Agent Mr Chan	棟篤特工	French Chef	Director: Jeff Cheung Ka-Kit. Starring: Dayo Wong Chi-Wah and Charmaine Sheh See-Man.
2016	Ghost In The Shell		Section 6 Agent	Directed by Rupert Sanders. Starring Scarlett Johansson, and Pilou Asbæk .
2016	Mission Milano	王牌逗王牌	Killer	Chinese-Hong Kong action adventure comedy film directed by Wong Jing. Starring Andy Lau.
2015	Pound of Flesh		Zoltan	Directed by Ernie Barbarash. Starring Jean-Claude Van Damme and the late Darren Shahlavi.
2015	Dragon Blade	天將雄師	General Paullus	Directed by Daniel Lee. Starring Jackie Chan, John Cusack, Adrien Brody, Lorie Pester, and Choi Siwon.
2015	Helios	赤道	Mr. Big’s bodyguard	Starring Chang Chen, Janice Man, Nick Cheung, Jacky Cheung, and Choi Siwon.
2015	Little Big Master	五個小孩的校長	Director of French Museum	Starring Miriam Yeung, and Louis Koo. The film is the 12th highest grossing Hong Kong film of all time.
2015	Lust & Found		Kimchi	Directed by Lawrence Gray
2014	VOR		Alexander Orlov	Written and directed by Philippe Joly.
2014	Hacker		Colombian Assassin	Directed by Kazakh director Akan Satayev; Starring Callan McAuliffe and Lorraine Nicholson.
2014	My Name Is Tanyusha		Vernon the magician	Philippe Joly is also co-writer and co-producer.
2014	From Vegas to Macau	賭城風雲	American Gangster	Directed by Wong Jing. Starring Chow Yun Fat. Produced by Andrew Lau, who directed the film Infernal Affairs, which was remade by Martin Scorsese in 2006 as The Departed.

=== Television ===
Year	Title	Chinese Title	Role	Notes
2022	Flying Tiger 3	飛虎之壯志英雄	Ivanovo	Produced by Shaw Brothers
2019	Flying Tiger 2	飛虎之雷霆極戰	MI6 Commander	Produced by Shaw Brothers
2014	Tiger Cubs II	飞虎II	Terrorist	Produced by TVB
2014	Lord of Shanghai	梟雄	Police officer	Produced by TVB
2014	The Ultimate Addiction	點金勝手	Chef	Produced by TVB

=== Short films ===
Year	Title	Role	Notes
2020	Bonus for the Bullseye	The Snake	Comedy written and Directed by Philippe Joly. Cinematography by Andreas Guzman. Also starring Anthony Roussel, Semiquaver Iafeta, Andreas Guzman.
2020	Not Today		Written and Directed by Philippe Joly. A short film launched for World Suicide Prevention Day in order to raise awareness. Starring Anthony Roussel and Semiquaver Iafeta.
2020	The Legacy	Mr. Mallick	Written and Directed by Philippe Joly as part of the Bloody River series exploring the criminal world in various chapters. This chapter, called The Legacy, looks at loyalty and mercy. Cinematography by Thomas Sandfield.
2020	Denial	Dad	Written and Directed by Philippe Joly as part of the Roger Corman challenge to filmmakers and the Corman Quarantine Film Festival.
2020	Family Business	Anton's Dad	Comedy, written and directed by Philippe Joly.
2019	Trigger Happy	Sam	Written and Directed by Philippe Joly. Director of photography Thomas Sandfield.
2016	Angel	Stefan	Written and Directed by Owen Fitzpatrick. Action and Fight Choreography by Philippe Joly
2016	Insomnia	Rudy, Psychiatrist	Written and Directed by Solomon Wong.
2014	Paid In Full		Written and Directed by Philippe Joly.
2014	Beef & Broccoli	Thug	Directed by Damon Dash; Kung-Fu short inspired by true events, shot on location in Hong Kong.

=== Modeling ===
Philippe occasionally works as a model for brands and advertising campaigns including:

- Tai Pan Row - luxury tailor in Hong Kong
- Kraftek - luxury Apple watch cases and bracelets
- 3D Robotics - 3DR Drone mini series
- Hong Kong SAR 20th Anniversary - TV commercial "Together, Progress, Opportunity".
- Rangerfone - Outdoor phone brand

== Early years ==
Before becoming an actor and getting involved in the film industry, Philippe Joly was an entrepreneur and digital marketing expert. He founded a number of technology start-ups in Ireland, Italy and Hong Kong, including:

- Safebox - Award-winning application that pioneered the field of mobile privacy in pre-smartphone Era
- clickSUMO - Leading A2P messaging platform
- EmerTech - A member of the Hong Kong Science & Technology Park (HKSTP) startups, it was originally conceived as an enabler of digital identity solutions using blockchain technologies, but the company pivoted during Covid to address agriculture needs specifically and became a popular provider of innovative Agritech solutions with projects across the EMEA and APAC regions.
- Yeloworld - Mobile VoIP application acquired by Talk360
- SIMchronise - Mobile data synchronisation company that was part of the High Potential Start-Ups unit of Enterprise Ireland

He is also the author of a book on start-ups and entrepreneurship called "Potemkin, Inc.".

Philippe first got into films as a screenwriter. His first screenplay was "No Tomorrow", which he co-wrote with his friend Paolo Rizzardini.
