= Vahdani =

Vahdani (Persian: وحدانی) is a surname. Notable people with the surname include:

- Behzad Vahdani (born 1988), Iranian judoka
- Keyvan Vahdani (1991–2019), Iranian football forward
