= Wabara =

Wabara is a surname. Notable people with the surname include:

- Adolphus Wabara (born 1948), Nigerian politician
- Lawrence Wabara, Nigerian footballer
- Reece Wabara (born 1991), English businessman and footballer
