= Min-chul =

- Hangul: 민철
- RR: Mincheol
- MR: Minch'ŏl

Min-chul, also spelled Min-chol, is a Korean given name.

People with this name include:

- Kang Min-chol (born 1948), North Korean politician
- Jung Min-cheul (born 1972), South Korean baseball pitcher
- Kang Minchul (born 1973), South Korean yongmudo practitioner
- Park Min-chul (born 1974), South Korean handball player
- Choi Min-chul (born 1976), South Korean actor
- Back Min-chul (born 1977), South Korean football goalkeeper
- Kim Min-chul (wrestler) (born 1983), South Korean Greco-Roman wrestler
- Kim Min-chul (actor)
- Son Min-chol (born 1986), North Korean football centre back (Japan Football League)
- Jang Min-chul (born 1991), South Korean professional StarCraft player
- An Min-chol, North Korean politician
- Kang Min-chul (c.1955 – 18 May 2008), North Korean soldier and one of the three perpetrators of the 1983 Rangoon bombing. He was sentenced to life imprisonment by a court in Burma and died in prison while serving his sentence

== See also ==
- List of Korean given names
