= Ink Pixel Films =

- Company type: Film Production Company
- Industry: Motion Pictures
- Founder: Various
- Headquarters: London, United Kingdom
- Products: Motion Pictures
- Website: inkpixelfilms.com

Ink Pixel Films is an English film production company founded by several British actors and directors in 2010.

Following the completion of On the Ropes in September 2011, a press release announced that Ink Pixel Films had signed a distribution deal with Cornerstone Media International to produce a further two feature films.

== Filmography ==
Year	Film	Director
2011	On the Ropes	Mark Noyce, Hamdy Taha
2012	Shaniqua	Hamdy Taha, Jennifer Young, Mark Noyce
2013	This is Jayde:The One Hit Wonder	Mark Noyce, Shaun Williamson, Hamdy Taha
2013	The Blazing Cannons	Not announced
2013	Walking the West Highland Way	Hamdy Taha

== Other ==
- The Ultimate Roy Shaw Collection (2010) (Graphics)
- Football Hooligans (2010) (Graphics)
- The Gangster Collection (2010) (Graphics)
