= Jayde =

Jayde may refer to:

== First name or given name ==
- Jayde Adams (born 1984), British comedian
- Jayde Herrick (born 1985), Australian cricketer
- Jayde Kruger (born 1988) South African racing driver
- Jayde Nicole (born 1986), Canadian model
- Jayde Taylor (born 1985), Australian field hockey player

== Surname ==
- Negrita Jayde (1958–2009), Canadian female bodybuilding champion, personal trainer, author, actor and businesswoman

== See also ==
- This Is Jayde: The One Hit Wonder, 2014 British comedy film
- Jayded, or Jayded Records, record label founded by Jay Sean
