= Jon Foo =

British actor

- Born: Jonathan Patrick Foo; 30 October 1982 (age 43); London, England
- Occupation: Actor
- Years active: 2004–present

Jon Foo (born 30 October 1982) is a British actor and martial artist of Irish Singaporean descent. He is known for his work on the CBS drama/sitcom Rush Hour and the cyber/apocalyptic action film Tekken.

== Early life ==
British Actor Jon Foo is of Irish Singaporean descent. He is known for his work on the CBS drama/sitcom Rush Hour and the cyber/apocalyptic action film Tekken. Jon began his career working as an acrobat for a variety of circus acts, shows and idents. He then moved to Hong Kong and Thailand where he booked some of his first movie roles in a crash course on action cinema. Credits include House of Fury, Tom-Yum-Goong, Rebirth, Extraction, Vikingdom, Universal Soldier: Regeneration, the Rush Hour television series, Weaponized, and Last Resort.

== Career ==
Being a practitioner of wushu, Foo has starred in Tom-Yum-Goong (American title: The Protector), Batman Begins, House of Fury, Left for Dead, and Life (Shi cha qi xiao shi). He also performs stunts for other actors. He is perhaps best known for playing the role of Jin Kazama in the 2009 live-action film Tekken. He also played Ryu in the short film Street Fighter: Legacy.

He also starred in Universal Soldier: Regeneration (2010) as one of the first-generation soldiers. He is set to appear in a Thai martial arts basketball film, Fireball Begins, which is a prequel to the first film, Fireball. Foo's films were his second lead role in Bangkok Revenge; he appears with Dominic Purcell in Vikingdom and Danny Glover in Extraction and stars as Detective Lee in the television adaptation of Rush Hour (the role played by Jackie Chan in the film series).

== Filmography ==
Year	Title	Role	Notes	Ref
2004	Life, Translated	Brian		
2004	10,000 Cigarettes	Himself	Documentary	
2005	Left for Dead	Street Fighter No.3		
2005	Tom-Yum-Goong	Wushu Fighter (as Jonathan Patrick Foo) / stunt performer		
2005	Batman Begins	League of Shadows member (uncredited) / stunt performer		
2005	House of Fury	John (as Jonathan Foo) / stunt performer (uncredited)		
2005	The Myth	Extra (uncredited) / stunt performer (uncredited)		
2009	Jagoan Bouginville	Yosia Si Reman Marsud		
2009	Tekken	Jin Kazama / stunt performer		
2009	Fireball			
2010	Universal Soldier: Regeneration	Vladimir		
2010	Street Fighter: Legacy	Ryu		
2010	Fireball Begins			
2012	Bangkok Revenge	Manit		
2013	Olympus Has Fallen	Stunt performer		
2013	Vikingdom	Yang		
2013	The Chrysanthemum Throne	Taki		
2013	Extraction	Mercy Callo		
2014	Duality	Danny		
2016	WEAPONiZED	Victor		
2016	Rush Hour	Detective Jonathan Lee	TV series – main cast	
2019	The Outsider	Jing Phang		
2023	Last Resort	Michael		
TBA	Awakened Dreams	Dagar	Post production	
