= Yongmudo =

Hybrid Korean martial art

- Highest governing body: International Yongmoodo Federation
- First played: South Korea, 2007

Characteristics
- Contact: Yes
- Type: Martial art

Presence
- Country or region: Worldwide
- World Championships: Masterships (2019)

Yongmudo
- Also known as: Yongmoodo, Yong Moo Do
- Focus: Striking, Throwing, Ground fighting, and Grappling
- Hardness: Full Contact
- Country of origin: South Korea
- Creator: Kim Jeong-haeng and Yong-In University Professors
- Famous practitioners: Yang Dongi, Kwan Ho Kwak, Do Hyung Kim
- Parenthood: Taekwondo, Hapkido, Judo, Boxing, Wrestling, Kumdo, and Ssireum

- Yongmudo
- Hangul: 용무도
- Hanja: 龍武道
- RR: Yongmudo
- MR: Yongmudo

Yongmudo, Yongmoodo or Yong Moo Do (Korean: 용무도) is a modern hybrid Korean martial art and a combat sport which combines different techniques from Taekwondo, Hapkido, Judo, Kumdo, and Ssireum as well as Boxing and Amateur wrestling.

== History ==
Yong-In University was founded in 1953 as a school originally offering studies on Judo. Since then, they have expanded their departments significantly, also creating fields of study for Taekwondo, Kumdo, Hapkido, Ssireum, Boxing and Wrestling. According to the founder of the martial art, Kim Jeong-haeng, Yongmudo was founded in 2001 when the Yong-In University professors from all seven martial arts' departments (mentioned previously) came together to create their own sport and hybrid martial art.

Norman Link believes that Yongmudo "was developed in part because as Taekwondo grew into a dazzling martial sport, it lost most of the other aspects, like self-defense."

== Etymology ==
The term Yongmoodo (literally translated as "Dragon Martial Way") comes from the word Hankido which was developed in Korea in 1976. Then the name changed to Kukmodo and then changed to Yongmoodo. Yongmoodo consists of three syllables: 1. YONG means dragon. 2. MU or MOO means martial which refers to fighting or battles and fights including defense and strategic, physical, mental, and physiology aspects. 3. DO means a way of training and a way of life and contains philosophy and the ability to learn from nature, live and fight, against nature.

== Features ==
Yongmudo uses various dynamic techniques from martial arts such as Taekwondo, Judo, and Ssirum and is based on physical, psychological, spiritual, and mental training with contemporary scientific knowledge. Yongmudo was developed with an emphasis on education, training and martial arts philosophy. It is a practical self-defense training system, combining most practical techniques from several traditional Korean martial arts as well as other related disciplines. The primary techniques of Yongmudo including offensive and defensive techniques are throwing, grappling and ground techniques from Judo, slamming and holding down from Wrestling, kicking, striking, thrusting, punching and blocking from Taekwondo, and joint locks from Hapkido.

== Scientific study ==
A study about the effects of Yongmoodo exercises confirmed that "the functional balance mat for Yongmoodo exercise program could improve the posture alignment pursuant and gait abilities of body imbalance of obese elementary students." Another study concluded that the high intensity yongmudo training could improve the maximum muscle strength of adult males. A study about the turning kicks in Taekwondo and Yongmudo reached the conclusion that the turning kick was performed quicker by the Taekwondo players.

== By country ==
=== Australia ===
The Yongmoodo Australia Association (YAA) and the Yongmoodo Oceania Association (YOA), founded by In Cheol Yoo (a graduate of Yong-In University), were established to formally support the objectives of Yong-In University's aim to develop and promote Yongmoodo in the world.

=== India ===
Indian Yongmudo Federation is the current governing body for Yongmudo in India. Indian Yongmudo Federation has subsequently created Indian Yongmudo Committee to manage and spread Yongmudo all over India. Indian Yongmudo Federation is also affiliated in School Games Federation Of India(SGFI). Yongmudo in India was founded by Rohit Narkar. Narkar is currently the President of Indian Yongmudo Federation.

=== Indonesia ===
Yongmudo is currently used extensively in military training in Indonesia. This sport has officially become a mandatory sport among the Indonesian Army since 2008.

=== Iran ===
Keyvan Dehnad is the founder and president of Iran Yongmudo Association (the current governing body for Yongmudo in Iran and the official national organization for the promotion of Yongmudo). Iran Yongmudo has been recognized by ministry of sport and Iran Martial Arts Federation and Member of International Yongmudo Federation. Amir Sheikh Hosseini won a gold medal and Reza Goodary won a silver medal in 2nd International Yongmudo Championships in 2016. Amir Sheikh Hosseini won a gold medal and Reza Goodary won a bronze medal in 2016 World Martial Arts Masterships. Iranian athletes won a gold medal Arya Sheikh Hosseini and a bronze medal Reza Goodary in 2019 World Martial Arts Masterships.

=== Malaysia ===
Dr. S. Suhaizy is the president of Malaysian Yongmudo Association. It was established in 2009.

=== Mongolia ===
Tsevegmed Enkhbat is the founder and president of the Mongolian Yongmudo Federation.It was founded in 2012.In 2016 2nd International Yongmudo Championship Ts.Odbayar silver medal.In 2019 Chungju World Martial Arts Masterships, D. Tserendorj and Ts. Odbayar finished 3rd place (bronze medal) and 5th place respectively.

=== South Korea ===
Kang Minchul is the manager of the Korean Yongmudo Association (KYA) and professor in the Department of Oriental Martial Arts at Yong In University. KYA is the headquarters and office of South Korea Yongmudo at Yong In University.

=== United States ===
Yongmudo is practiced in University of California Martial Arts Program. The US Yongmudo Association is the official national organization for the promotion of Yongmudo in the US. Russell Ahn is the current US Yongmudo Association President and Deputy Secretary General of the International Yongmudo Federation.

== World Martial Arts Masterships Result ==
=== 2019 ===
Category	Gold	Silver	Bronze
Men's -60 kg	(Nepal) Rohan Guruwacharya	(Nepal) Bibek Maharjan	(Malaysia) Ramanan R Muralitharan
Men's -60 kg	(Nepal) Rohan Guruwacharya	(Nepal) Bibek Maharjan	(Malaysia) Muhammad Nurhaziq Rusly
Men's -65 kg	(South Korea) Min Hyeok Nam	(South Korea) Chang Dae Kim	(Indonesia) Firdaus
Men's -65 kg	(South Korea) Min Hyeok Nam	(South Korea) Chang Dae Kim	(Malaysia) Danesh Murugan
Men's -70 kg	(Uzbekistan) Otabek Fozilov	(Nepal) Roberto Kapali	(Uzbekistan) Abdulatif Khabibullaev
Men's -70 kg	(Uzbekistan) Otabek Fozilov	(Nepal) Roberto Kapali	(Malaysia) Wan Indera Luthfi
Men's -75 kg	(South Korea) Woo Jin Kim	(South Korea) Jae Hyun Lee	(Indonesia) Zulkifli Ago
Men's -75 kg	(South Korea) Woo Jin Kim	(South Korea) Jae Hyun Lee	(Mongolia) Tserendorj Damdindorj
Men's -85 kg	(South Korea) Seong Min Lee	(Indonesia) Muhammad Ali Murtadho	(China) Yawen Wang
Men's -85 kg	(South Korea) Seong Min Lee	(Indonesia) Muhammad Ali Murtadho	(China) Dilong An
Men's -90 kg	(South Korea) Dong Hyuk Bae	(China) Zheng Yu Ting	(Iran) Reza Goodary
Men's +90 kg	(Iran) Arya Sheikh Hosseini	(South Korea) Jin Uoung Oh	(South Korea) Hee June Cho
Women's -55 kg	(South Korea) Soo Hyun Kim	(Japan) Kyoka Sugama	(Nepal) Sharmila Tamang
Women's -55 kg	(South Korea) Soo Hyun Kim	(Japan) Kyoka Sugama	(Japan) Akari Itohisa
Women's -60 kg	(South Korea) Song E Chea	(China) Xiaoshi Li	(South Korea) Seon Yeong Hwang
Women's -60 kg	(South Korea) Song E Chea	(China) Xiaoshi Li	(United States) Hyoseon Kim
Women's +60 kg	(South Korea) Min Hyeong Jang	(Nepal) Anu Maya Tamang	(Japan) Ami Unozawa

== Yongmudo practitioners in other combat sports ==
Yang Dongi, Kwan Ho Kwak, and Do Hyung Kim are Yongmudo experts who became professional MMA fighters.

Do Hyung Kim also competed successfully and won in SGAA, a submission grappling tournament in South Korea.

Dongi Yang also competed and defeated his opponent, Chang Seob Lee, via TKO, in a professional Combat Sambo tournament, SSF - Super Sambo Festival, in 2007.

== See also ==
- World Martial Arts Masterships
- 2016 Pekan Olahraga Nasional
- Ssireum
- Hapkido
- Judo
- Taekwondo
- Boxing
- Amateur wrestling
- Kumdo
- Combat sport
