= Pound of Flesh (2015 film) =

- Theatrical release poster
- Directed by: Ernie Barbarash
- Written by: Joshua James
- Produced by: Jonathan DuBois; Jeffrey Giles; Mike Leeder; Henry Luk; Michael Lurie; Kirk Shaw
- Starring: Jean-Claude Van Damme; Charlotte Peters; Darren Shahlavi
- Cinematography: Cliff Hokanson
- Edited by: Asim Nuraney
- Music by: Paul Michael Thomas
- Production companies: Ace Studio; Odyssey Media
- Distributed by: Entertainment One
- Release date: May 15, 2015 (VOD)
- Running time: 104 minutes
- Country: Canada
- Language: English
- Budget: $7.5 million

Pound of Flesh is a 2015 Canadian action film directed by Ernie Barbarash, and starring Jean-Claude Van Damme, Charlotte Peters, and Darren Shahlavi. It is the third collaboration between Van Damme and Barbarash (following Assassination Games in 2011 and Six Bullets in 2012).

== Plot ==
Deacon, a former black-ops agent, is in Manila, Philippines awaiting an operation to donate his kidney to his dying niece. He awakens the day after the procedure to find he is a victim of organ theft. Stitched up and furious, Deacon descends from his opulent hotel in search of his stolen kidney and carves a blood-soaked path through the darkest corners of the city – brothels, fight clubs, back-alley black markets and elite billionaire estates. The clock is ticking for his niece and with each step he loses blood.

== Cast ==
- Jean-Claude Van Damme as Agent Deacon Lyle
- Charlotte Peters as Anna Riley
- Darren Shahlavi as Drake
- Aki Aleong as Kung
- John Ralston as George Lyle
- Jason Tobin as Liam
- Philippe Joly as Zoltan
- Brahim Achabbakhe as Nardo
- Andrew Ng as Father Fong
- Mike Leeder as Boris
- Ryan 'Ranga' Pyne as Yevgeny
- Marsha Yuan as Bette
- Terese Cilluffo as Connie
- Adele Baughan as Isabella Lyle
- TFBOYS as Boy Band
- David P Booth as Simon Rants Sr.
- James Houghton as Simon Rants Jr.

== Production ==
=== Filming ===
Principal photography and production ended on May 24, 2014.

On January 14, 2015, Shahlavi died in his sleep at the age of 42. The film's end credits start with an In memoriam to him.

== Reception ==
=== Critical response ===
On review aggregator website Rotten Tomatoes, the film holds an approval rating of 17%, based on 12 reviews, and an average rating of 3.7/10. On Metacritic, the film has a weighted average score of 41 out of 100, based on 5 critics, indicating "mixed or average reviews".
