= Behzad Vahdani =

Iranian judoka

Personal information
- National team: Iran
- Born: May 29, 1988 (age 38) Bojnord, North Khorasan Province, Iran
- Home town: Kolab Village, Bojnord
- Occupation: Coach of Iranian Judo adolescents Team
- Weight: 66 kg (146 lb) (2018)

Sport
- Country: Iran
- Sport: Judo, Kurash
- Weight class: minus 66 kg
- Team: Iranian national Kurash team
- Coached by: Majid Ariayi, Reza Mahnan, Arash Miresmaeili
Medal record
North African International Championships Vice Hero
Representing Best judoka in the Iran's premier league
Gold medal – first place	2013 Kurash World Cup in Turkey	60 kg
Gold medal – first place	2016 World Martial Arts Masterships in South Korea	60 kg
Gold medal – first place	2017 Asian Indoor and Martial Arts Games in Turkmenistan in Kurash field	60 kg
Bronze medal – third place	2011 Kurash Uzbekistan Cup	60 kg
Bronze medal – third place	2013 World Armies Championships in Kazakhstan in Judo field	60 kg
Bronze medal – third place	2017 10th Kurash World Championship of Adult Tournament in Turkey	66 kg

Behzad Vahdani was born on 29 May 1988 in Kolab Village, Bojnord, North Khorasan Province, Iran. He is the champion of the Kurash in the world. He is an Iranian judoka and former member of the Kurash national team of Iran. He won a gold medal in Kurash field on 2017 Asian Indoor and Martial Arts Games. In October 2019, Arash Miresmaeili (President of the Iranian Judo Federation) was selected Behzad Vahdani as the coach of the national adolescents Judo team.

== Life ==
Behzad Vahdani, is an athlete from the village of Kalab, a Bojnord suburb of Khorasan province, Iran, is the last child of a large family. He has been practicing since he was 9 years old. He initially worked in freestyle wrestling given that his uncles and brothers were traditional wrestling athletes. From the age of 12, he started Judo and Kurash and from the age of 18 he entered the professional sport. In the second decade of his life, he became a member of the Iranian Judo and Kurash national teams. He was selected as "Top Young" in his province and the top judoist in the country's premier league.

He was a member of the national Judo team at the beginning and practicing Kurash at the same time, but later he decided to pursue his professional career in Kurash.

He said about Judo: "Judo learned me discipline and respect to others."

In Jakarta Palembang 2018 Asian Games, he said "this may be my last time in the world of professional sports".

== Career ==
=== Iran Kurash national team ===
He won the gold medal at the minus 60 kg weight class as a member of the Iranian national team of Kurash in the 2017 Asian Indoor and Martial Arts Games in Turkmenistan.

=== Olympic Gold in Martial Arts of South Korea ===
He won a gold medal at the World Martial Arts Masterships in North Chungcheong Province, South Korea.

=== Kurash World Championship in Turkey ===
He won a gold medal in these competitions in 2013.

=== Coach of the national adolescents Judo team ===
In October 2019, he was appointed as coach of the national adolescents Judo team by Arash Miresmaeili (President of the Iranian Judo Federation).

=== World Cup and Grand Slam competitions ===
Behzad Vahdani withdrew from competing with his Israeli opponent in the World Cup and Grand Slam matches in 2012 and 2016. He tells about it: "Twice in the World Cup in Georgia, when I encountered an opponent of the Zionist regime, I withdrew from the match because I do not legalize Israel as a country. One of the principles of heros culture has always been in defense of the oppressed people and I quit the race to support the oppressed Palestinian people."

== Honors ==
- Gold at the World Championships in Turkey in Kurash field in 2013
- Gold medal at World Martial Arts Masterships in South Korea in Kurash field in 2016
- Gold medal at 2017 Asian Indoor and Martial Arts Games in Turkmenistan in Kurash field
- Bronze medal at World Armies Championships in Kazakhstan in Judo field in 2013
- Bronze medal at Uzbekistan Kurash Cup in 2011
- Bronze medal at 10th Kurash World Championship of Adult Tournament in Turkey in 2017
- North African International Championships Vice Hero
- More than 20 medals in the national youth and adolescents competitions
- Third place in the forty-first round of the judo championship in the weight category minus 60 kg in October 2016

== See also ==
- Arash Miresmaeili
- Iran at the 2008 Summer Olympics
- World Martial Arts Masterships
