= Bad Day (2010 film) =

- Directed by: Ian David Diaz
- Written by: Ian David Diaz; Alan Dunlop; Anthony Ofoegbu
- Produced by: Ian David Diaz; Gena Helen Ashwell
- Starring: Claire Goose; Donna Air; Anthony Ofoegbu; George Calil; Sarah Harding
- Distributed by: Centre Media Film Sales; ISIS Films
- Release date: 24 May 2010 (UK DVD Release)
- Running time: 94 minutes
- Language: English

Bad Day is an independent British film starring Claire Goose, Donna Air, Sarah Harding, Anthony Ofoegbu and Robbie Gee. It is the latest feature film from director Ian David Diaz, whose past films include The Killing Zone, Dead Room and Fallen Angels.

== Synopsis ==
Rebecca Ryan has a bad day.

== Cast ==
- Rebecca Ryan/Margaret – Claire Goose
- Abby Barrett – Donna Air
- Darius Cruise – Anthony Ofoegbu
- Harry McCann – George Calil
- Marla McCann – Riana Husselmann
- Trigg – Tom Bacon
- David Cummings – Keith Eyles
- Benjamin Radcliffe – Robbie Gee
- Jade Jennings – Sarah Harding
- Aaron White – Marlon Sage Kerr
- Triftan Jarret – Dominic Debias
- Mr. Ward – Ben Shockley
- Mrs. Ward – Sadie Tonk
- Lynn Ryan – Olivia Glynn-Jones

== Production notes ==
- Although incorrectly described in The British Film Catalogue as having been shot on 35 mm movie film, Bad Day was in fact one of the first independent feature films shot entirely in the UK using the Panasonic AG-HVX200 P2 camera.
- Notably, this was the first acting performance in a feature film from Sarah Harding of the popular UK girl band Girls Aloud. Owing to release schedules, her subsequent appearance in St Trinian's 2: The Legend of Fritton's Gold was released to the public before Bad Day.
- When it was decided that Sarah Harding's character in the film should have long, dark hair, a wig was used to cover her distinctive short blonde crop.
- The visual FX supervisor for Bad Day had previously worked on The Da Vinci Code, commenting that the number of individual FX shots he completed on Bad Day exceeded those on this previous film. SVFX included green screen driving scenes, muzzle flash and squib/wound/blood enhancements, mic/wire removal, digital scene enhancements, and day-for-night image manipulation.
- The original score was composed by Dominic Glynn, who is best known for his work on the TV series Doctor Who.

== Reception ==
Bad Day was released as a direct-to-video release on DVD and Blu-ray in the UK.
