= Lockdown (2022 film) =

2022 British-Hong Kong film by Bizhan Tong

- Directed by: Bizhan Tong
- Written by: Bizhan Tong
- Produced by: Bizhan Tong; Philip Ma
- Starring: Xander Berkeley; Kevin Leslie; Andrew “Mr Cakebox” Akinyede; Anita Chui; John Savage; Alix Wilton Regan; Pamela Nomvete; Jumayn Hunter; Mike Leeder; Reza Diako
- Edited by: Mitchell Tolliday
- Production companies: Phoenix Waters Productions; AMM Global Media
- Release date: 2022
- Countries: United Kingdom; Hong Kong
- Language: English

Lockdown is a 2022 global pandemic thriller film written and directed by Bizhan Tong. The film stars Xander Berkeley and Kevin Leslie, with an international cast including Anita Chui, John Savage, Alix Wilton Regan, Pamela Nomvete, and Mike Leeder in supporting roles.

Lockdown tells the story of an actor who enters an audition and is forced by the casting director to pass a series of tests or else someone around him will die. Despite challenges posed by the COVID-19 pandemic the movie was written, financed, and filmed around the world including Hong Kong, the UK, USA, Italy, and Japan entirely during that period.

In September 2021, Lockdown made history as the world's 1st hybrid NFT feature and Asia's 1st NFT feature film with 5 copies minted as NFTs in advance of a traditional release.

== Plot ==
While the world continues to grapple with the COVID-19 pandemic and much of the world is in lockdown, actor Larry Boyle enters an audition where casting director Joel forces him to pass a series of tests in order to keep those around him alive.

As events escalate and more people around the world are trapped in Joel's web Larry must confront his past, overcome his present, and answer the most pressing question about this game - Why?

== Production ==
Following a partnership between Asia Television and Phoenix Waters Productions whereby Bizhan Tong would develop several Films, Series, and Variety shows for the Hong Kong broadcaster as its Executive Producer, Lockdown was the first project placed under development. Principal photography commenced in September 2020, with Bizhan Tong directing a screenplay he had written in response to the passing of his mentor and the George Floyd protests which took place in the weeks after. Filming wrapped in November and was announced in December 2020. The film is an international co-production with scenes shot around the world including the UK, Hong Kong, USA, Italy and Japan. It is also the launch of a new international franchise with plans for the sequel to expand to South Korea with Tong already in talks with a Korean star. In January 2021 amid a corporate restructuring, AMM Global Media was formed as part of the ATV Group in order to devote itself entirely to creative entertainment with international appeal, with all 19 of Tong's creative projects including Lockdown (2021) shifting there, and Tong's remit expanding to act as its executive director. An eclectic cast was hired for the production ranging from Do the Right Thing actor John Savage and The Walking Dead actor Xander Berkeley to AV Idol Meguri.

On March 15, 2021 the trailer and poster for Lockdown was released to coincide with FILMART.

The film was shot between September and November 2020. In order to minimize risk of COVID-19 infection, separate production teams were hired in the UK, Hong Kong, and Japan with the director being the only member of the production who would fly between sets. In other cases the actors were directed remotely.
