= Kang Minchul =

South Korean yonmudoin (born 1973)

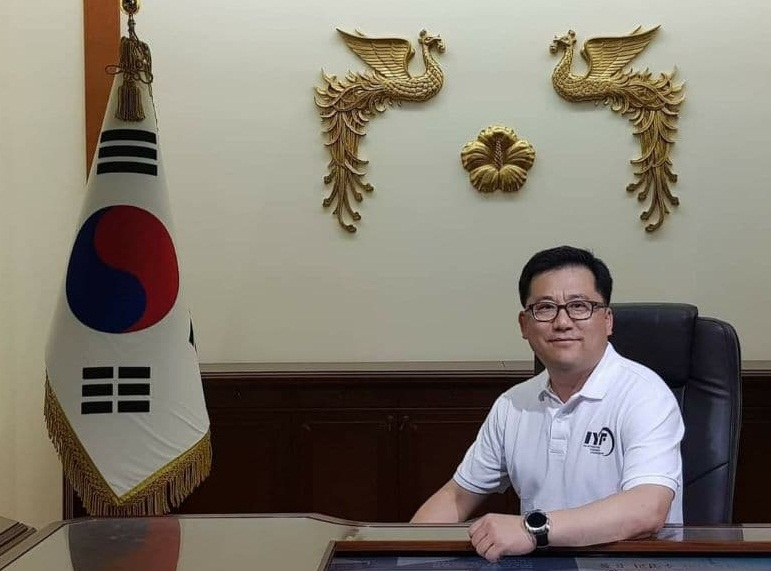
- Born: 16 March 1973
- Nationality: South Korean
- Style: Yongmudo

Kang Minchul (Korean: 강민철; born 16 March 1973) is a South Korean yongmudo practitioner (Grand Master) and a professor in the Department of Oriental Martial Arts at Yong In University. He is the manager of the Korean Yongmudo Association (KYA).
