= This Is Jayde: The One Hit Wonder =

- Directed by: Mark Noyce
- Written by: Mark Noyce; Shaun Williamson
- Produced by: Mark Noyce
- Starring: Mark Noyce; Shaun Williamson; Rebecca Edwards
- Music by: Grange farm studio
- Production company: Happy Pup Films
- Release date: 3 November 2014
- Country: United Kingdom
- Language: English

This Is Jayde: The One Hit Wonder is a 2014 British comedy film directed by Mark Noyce, who also wrote and starred alongside and Shaun Williamson. The film follows Jayde, a former 90's popstar desperate for a return to the limelight, that places all his hopes on a TV talent show hosted by Williamson's character Shaun.

== Cast ==
- Mark Noyce as Jayde
- Shaun Williamson as Shaun
- Rebecca Edwards as Daisy Thompson
