= Ten Dead Men =

- Theatrical release poster
- Directed by: Ross Boyask
- Screenplay by: Chris Regan
- Story by: Ross Boyask & Phil Hobden
- Produced by: Phil Hobden
- Starring: Brendan Carr, Terry Stone, Doug Bradley, Pooja Shah, Ben Shockley, Lee Latchford-Evans, JC Mac, Tom Gerald
- Cinematography: Darren Berry
- Edited by: Ross Boyask
- Music by: Scott Benzie
- Distributed by: IFM Worldwide Releasing LLC
- Release date: 26 April 2008 (Fighting Spirit Film Festival)
- Running time: 90 minutes
- Country: United Kingdom
- Language: English
- Budget: US$250,000

Ten Dead Men is a 2008 thriller film directed by Ross Boyask, produced by Phil Hobden, and starring Brendan Carr, Terry Stone, Doug Bradley, Pooja Shah, Ben Shockley, Lee Latchford-Evans, JC Mac, and Tom Gerald. It is the follow-up to the cult independent film Left for Dead. Produced by the same company, (Modern Life?) Ten Dead Men features many of the same actors as its predecessor. The film released in UK, France, Indonesia and Japan.

== Synopsis ==
As the film begins, Ryan has spent years putting his brutal past behind him—a different man now to the stone cold killer he was a lifetime ago. But when an old face from the past arrives on his doorstep, Ryan is called upon to repay a blood debt from years ago. But the price is too high. Betrayed, and with his life falling apart around him, Ryan goes on a murderous, bloody revenge spree against the Ten Men who took his life away from him.

== Cast ==
Actor	Role
Brendan Carr (actor)	Ryan
Pooja Shah	Amy
Doug Bradley	Narrator
Ben Shockley	Keller
John Rackham	Axel
Keith Eyles	Projects Manager
JC Mac	Parker
Jason Lee Hyde	Garrett
Tom Gerald	Bruiser
Lee Latchford-Evans	Harris
Jason Maza	Boulder
Silvio Simac	Loomis

== Production ==
It took 18 months from production starting to finishing filming. The film's action was handled by Hong Kong fight director/stunt man Jude Poyer who has worked alongside actors such as Jet Li and Jean-Claude Van Damme on a host of US and Asian action films.

The film stars actor/martial artist Brendan Carr, Terry Stone, Pooja Shah, Ben Shockley, Lee Latchford-Evans, JC Mac, Tom Gerald, and Phil Hobden. Doug Bradley provides the film's voiceover narration.

The film also features cameos from actor/musician/entertainer Chico, MMA fighter Kimo, Dave Legeno, Cage Rage promoter Dave O'Donnell, Silvio Simac, Cecily Fay and Glenn Salvage.

== Critical reaction ==
The production of Ten Dead Men was tracked in regular articles in Impact Magazine, written by the film's producer Phil Hobden. Impact Magazine was given the first review of the film.

"This is passionate genre filmmaking inspired by… Rodriguez and the hard-hitting but playful style of Quentin Tarantino" Richard Hawes, Facebook Movies

"The film easily clubs aside any British alternative… this is revenge actually, a dish served cold and bloody, littered with plenty of limbs and shrapnel" Rich Badley, Close-Up Film

"Fusing action, drama and violence into a blistering whole, Ten Dead Men shows us Brits can hold our own in the action arena." Andrew Skeats

"…well directed, great writing, incredible fight scenes and a star making performance from Carr all adding up to one of the best British action movies of the decade. " Will Strong, Combat Magazine

== Locations ==
Ten Dead Men is set in an unnamed fictional town, but in reality was filmed mostly in London and Brighton. Notable locations in the film included Bovingdon, Buckinghamshire and in and around the streets and the seafront of Brighton.
