= Lawrence Wabara =

Nigerian footballer

Lawrence Wabara was a Nigerian footballer who represented the Nigeria national football team in the 1950s.

== Personal life ==
Wabara is the estranged father of the England international footballer Mark Walters, and the English boxer Pelé Reid. His grandson, Reece is also a former professional footballer in the United Kingdom.
