= Left for Dead (2005 film) =

Left For Dead
- Directed by: Ross Boyask
- Written by: Adrian Foiadelli
- Produced by: Phil Hobden
- Starring: Glenn Salvage, Adam Chapman, Andy Prior, Brendan Carr
- Cinematography: Ross Boyask
- Edited by: Ross Boyask
- Music by: Pinda Dhanoya
- Distributed by: IFM Worldwide Releasing LLC
- Release date: 9 September 2005
- Running time: 115 minutes
- Country: United Kingdom
- Language: English
- Budget: £200,000

Left for Dead is a 2005 British action film directed by Ross Boyask.

== Plot ==
Left for Dead is a revenge thriller set in a city called Hope, where a crime lord called Kincaid rules with an iron fist. Williams, a former hitman for Kincaid, is attacked and left for dead when he tries to leave the organisation. He teams up with Kelso, a kickboxer who had his hands smashed by Kincaid, and together they must fight to exact revenge on the criminal empire that holds their city in an iron grasp.

== Cast ==
Mostly the filmmakers cast unknowns in the film. Original Kincaid actor Gordon Alexander left the production after 2 months due to 'creative differences'. He later went on to star in the critically hammered British arthouse action film The Purifiers.

Left for Dead also features the first on-screen performance from Bourne Ultimatum star Joey Ansah in a very small combat role.

Actors and stunt performers Jon Foo and Joey Ansah have cameo roles as one of the fighters.

== Production ==
Left For Dead was shot over 18 months in Brighton and Eastbourne, East Sussex and debuted at Cannes 2004 with a packed market screening in the Riviera building. It was quickly picked up by sales agent Barbara Mudge and her Beverly Hills-based company Worldwide Filmed Entertainment LLC.

Self-funded, the film was the work of UK director-producer team Ross Boyask & Phil Hobden. Starring Glenn (Take Three Girls, The Silencer) Salvage, Andy Prior, Adam Chapman and a host of the UK's most talented action martial arts stars, 'Left For Dead' has action choreographed by Gordon Alexander (Accidental Spy) & Independent Stunts (Blood Myth, The Silencer)

The film has been released in over 15 countries to date, including the UK, Canada, USA and Thailand.

== Critical reaction ==
'John Woo Styled action in a UK Setting' Kim Newman – Empire

'If this film had been made in the 70s Tarantino would cite it as an influence' Mike Leeder – Impact (action entertainment magazine)

'Taking low budget action cinema to new levels of delirium and viciousness, Left For Dead happens to be an amazing adrenaline rush of a film' Matthew Sanderson, Rumourmachine.com

'Left for Dead is one hell of an action movie... pushing the action to extremes while maintaining an engaging plot' 4/5 Mark Pollard, Kungfucinema.com

'bloody and violent martial arts action... the fights come at you furiously... Left For Dead, thankfully, differs from the norm' − 6.5/10 Gregory Conley, yourvideostoreshelf.com

'Sets a whole new standard for digital video production... the UK movie scene just got its butt kicked!' 4.5/5 Dean Meadows, VENGEANCE Magazine
