= On the Ropes (2011 film) =

- Official cover (UK version)
- Directed by: Mark Noyce; Hamdy Taha
- Written by: Mark Noyce
- Starring: Joe Egan; Mark Noyce; Ben Shockley
- Edited by: Hamdy Taha
- Music by: Grange farm studio
- Distributed by: Cornerstone media international
- Release date: 6 December 2011
- Country: United Kingdom
- Language: English

On the Ropes is a 2011 British mockumentary film written and directed by Mark Noyce. It follows the fictional character of martial arts instructor Keith Kraft and his rivalry with boxing gym owner Big Joe, played by actor and former boxer Joe Egan. The cast also includes Ben Shockley, Lindsay Honey, Raymond Griffiths, Sean Byrne and Alex Vincent.

== Cast ==
- Joe Egan as Big Joe
- Mark Noyce as Keith Kraft
- Ben Shockley as Mick Western
- Lindsay Honey as Arthur
- Steve Coleman as Shane Powers
- Raymond Griffiths as Jack
- Emma Louise Cargill as Candy
- Sean Byrne as Grant
- Alex Vincent as Prank Caller
- Pelé Reid as Competition fighter
- Brooke Burfitt as Sarah (Big Joe's girlfriend)

== Premiere and UK DVD release ==
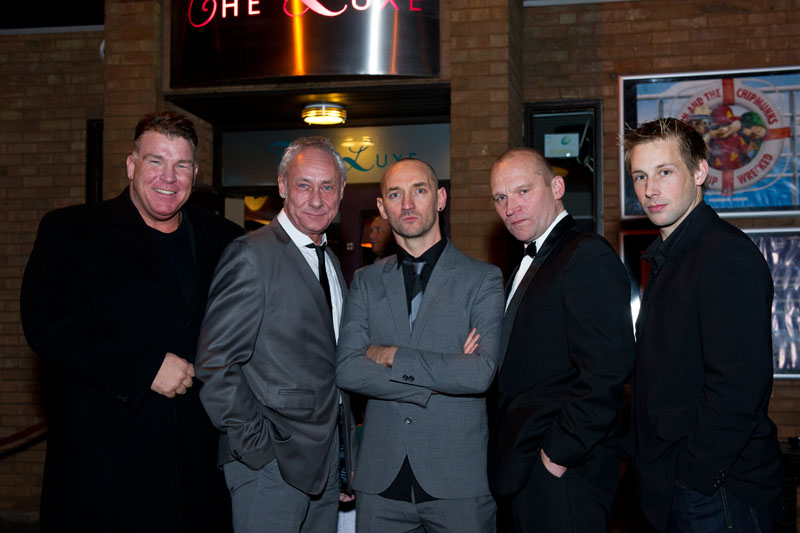
The premiere of On the Ropes at the Luxe cinema, 2011. Pictured left to right, Joe Egan, Lindsay Honey, Mark Noyce, Ben Shockley and Steve Coleman

The film was premiered at the Luxe cinema on 6 December 2011. Ben Shockley, Steve Coleman and Emma Louise Cargill attended a public showing on 7 December 2011 and provided a questions and answers session to members of the audience.

The UK DVD was released on 23 April 2012.

== Critical reception ==
The film received mostly positive reviews from critics.

Britflicks critic Zachary Cooke gave the film a favourable review saying "There may not be an obvious category to put on the Ropes into, but it’s really just a great film that tips its hat to documentaries, dramas and the egos of those that are part of reality TV". He was also complimentary about the quality of the acting and commented that "Both lead actors Mark Noyce and Ben Shockley are very convincing in their roles".

Richard Cross of A Full Tank of Gas stated "Thankfully, while on the Ropes is highly derivative of The Office – particularly in the performance of leading man Mark Noyce, who also wrote and directed – it generates a surprising amount of good will on the part of the viewer thanks largely to likeable performances and a refusal to take itself too seriously". However he went on to write that "While Noyce gives an enjoyable performance as Kraft, his mannerisms and speech patterns are so closely modelled on those of The Office’s David Brent that his performance draws unnecessary – and unfavourable – comparisons, which is a shame because it diminishes his achievements in other departments".

The British Comedy Guide editor Mark Boosey wrote "this mockumentary gets off to a faltering start as it struggles to focus on anything in particular". but felt "things improve when the movie does settle down on the idea of following around and focusing on karate instructor Keith Kraft. This monstrous egocentric 'plonker' carries many of the film's best lines and set pieces, and is played very well by the film's creator, Mark Noyce.”

== Soundtrack ==
Songs featured in 'On the Ropes' are:

- "You" by Neil Cousin
- "You’re my favorite actor" by This Machine 'Smoking Monkey Remix' (Remix by Andy Sweet)
- "Karaoke" by Ask Alfie
- "I’ve been down" by Dallas Twyman
- "Shellac" by Captain Black No Stars
- "Islamjam" by Carbide
- "Make a breakthrough" by Petruccio, Lamont featuring Lianne Harvey
- "Where you sleep" by This Machine
- "Doors" by Kenworthy
- "Room with a view" by Lexie Green
- "Lazy days" by The 925s
