= World Martial Arts Masterships =

Olympic of martial art

Chungju World Martial Arts Masterships
- Location: North Chungcheong Province, South Korea
- Website: http://www.chungju2019.com/home_eng/main.php

The World Martial Arts Masterships is an international martial arts competition that has been held in the North Chungcheong Province, South Korea. A total of 2 masterships have been held, with the 2016 iteration being held in Cheongju, and the 2019 competition being held in Chungju. ko:세계무예마스터십

== Background ==
The World Combat Games were founded by Global Association of International Sports Federations (then known as SportAccord) with the first rendition being held in Beijing, China in 2010. The 2013 rendition was then held in St. Petersburg, Russia. Following the demise of SportAccord due to conflicts with the International Olympic Committee after the 2013 games, the World Combat Games were halted. The World Martial Arts Masterships Committee was then created to continue the idea of a martial arts-only multi-sport event.

== Games ==
Number	Year	Host city	Country
1	2016	Cheongju	South Korea
2	2019	Cheongju	South Korea

== Online Games ==
http://online.mastership.org/en/index.jsp

Number	Year	Host city	Country
1	2021 Online World Martial Arts Masterships	Cheongju	South Korea

Duration : 2021. Oct. 29th ~ Nov. 2nd (5 days)

== Youth Games ==
Number	Year	Host city	Country
1	2017	Jincheon	South Korea

== 2016 Competition ==
The 2016 competition lasted for 1 week, featuring 2,400 martial artists from 81 countries competing in 17 martial arts. The martial art program consisted of: wrestling, judo, Jujutsu, kendo, kickboxing, muay thai, sambo, taekwondo, and wushu. The masterships events consisted of horseback archery, kabaddi, hapkido, kurash, taekkyeon, Tong-Il Moo-Do, yongmudo, and 'martial arts show' and 'martial arts contest' events.

=== Sports ===
- Belt Wrestling
- Horseback Archery
- Judo
- Ju-Jitsu
- Hapkido
- Kendo
- Kurash
- Kickboxing
- Muaythai
- Taekkyeon
- Taekwondo
- Yongmudo
- Sambo
- Tong-Il Moo-Do
- Wushu
- Martial Arts Record Contest
- Martial Arts Show

=== 2016 Medals ===
Rank	Nation	Gold	Silver	Bronze	Total
1	South Korea (KOR)	72	58	59	189
2	Iran (IRI)	17	9	11	37
3	Mongolia (MGL)	8	8	7	23
4	Thailand (THA)	8	5	10	23
5	Russia (RUS)	6	7	7	20
6	France (FRA)	6	3	10	19
7	Kyrgyzstan (KGZ)	5	3	2	10
8	China (CHN)	4	5	8	17
9	Kazakhstan (KAZ)	4	0	5	9
10	Philippines (PHI)	3	2	3	8
11	Uzbekistan (UZB)	3	0	3	6
12	Indonesia (INA)	2	9	5	16
13	United States (USA)	2	8	5	15
14	Hong Kong (HKG)	2	4	10	16
15	Pakistan (PAK)	2	1	0	3
16	Turkey (TUR)	2	0	2	4
17	Kenya (KEN)	1	3	5	9
18	Chinese Taipei (TPE)	1	3	2	6
19	Jordan (JOR)	1	2	5	8
20	Tajikistan (TJK)	1	2	0	3
21	Australia (AUS)	1	1	2	4
22	Canada (CAN)	1	1	0	2
22	Japan (JPN)	1	1	0	2
24	Poland (POL)	1	0	3	4
25	Singapore (SIN)	1	0	1	2
26	Ethiopia (ETH)	1	0	0	1
26	Laos (LAO)	1	0	0	1
26	Netherlands (NED)	1	0	0	1
29	Malaysia (MAS)	0	3	6	9
30	India (IND)	0	2	17	19
31	Vietnam (VIE)	0	2	7	9
32	Switzerland (SUI)	0	2	1	3
33	Iraq (IRQ)	0	2	0	2
34	Spain (ESP)	0	1	4	5
35	Bangladesh (BAN)	0	1	3	4
36	South Africa (RSA)	0	1	1	2
37	Burundi (BDI)	0	1	0	1
37	Ecuador (ECU)	0	1	0	1
37	European Union	0	1	0	1
37	Italy (ITA)	0	1	0	1
37	Macau (MAC)	0	1	0	1
37	Nigeria (NGR)	0	1	0	1
37	Saint Kitts and Nevis (SKN)	0	1	0	1
44	Cambodia (CAM)	0	0	2	2
44	Nepal (NEP)	0	0	2	2
46	Argentina (ARG)	0	0	1	1
46	Bhutan (BHU)	0	0	1	1
46	Bulgaria (BUL)	0	0	1	1
46	Costa Rica (CRC)	0	0	1	1
46	Eswatini (SWZ)	0	0	1	1
46	Germany (GER)	0	0	1	1
46	Ghana (GHA)	0	0	1	1
46	Hungary (HUN)	0	0	1	1
46	Moldova (MDA)	0	0	1	1
46	Sri Lanka (SRI)	0	0	1	1
46	Sweden (SWE)	0	0	1	1
46	Tanzania (TAN)	0	0	1	1
46	Tunisia (TUN)	0	0	1	1
Totals (58 entries)		158	156	221	535

== 2019 Competition ==
The 2019 championships were the second iteration of the masterships and featured 3,119 martial artists from 106 countries competing in 20 different martial arts areas over 275 medals. The motto was "Beyond the Times, Bridge the World".

The opening ceremony for the 2019 competition was held at Chungju Central Sports Stadium on August 30. It had 15,000 attendees and featured a performance from the Republic of Korea Air Force's Black Eagles aerobatic team. In total, 150,556 spectators and 900 volunteers were present during the entire duration of the masterships. Turkmenistan finished at first place with 19 medals, followed by South Korea with 17. The cost of the 2019 championships has been estimated to be 15 billion South Korean won. Additionally, an international martial arts film festival featuring 51 different films was also held during the same period.

Aikido and savate were added and kickboxing and kendo were removed from the martial arts program. Pencak silat and ssireum were added to the masterships program.

=== Sports ===
List of Sports:

GAISF Events (85):

- Aikido (0)
- Belt Wrestling (12)
- Judo (5)
- Ju-Jitsu (12)
- Muaythai (10)
- Sambo (15)
- Savate (9)
- Taekwondo (6)
- Wushu (16)

Non GAISF Events (106):

- Horseback Archery (10)
- Korean Hapkido (9)
- Kabaddi (2)
- Kurash (15)
- Pencak silat (15)
- Ssireum (8)
- Taekkyeon (8)
- Yongmudo (10)
- Tong-Il Moo-Do (12)
- Martial Arts Record Contest (9)
- Martial Arts Show (8)

=== 2019 Medals (GAISF and Non GAISF) ===
Rank	Nation	Gold	Silver	Bronze	Total
1	South Korea (KOR)	52	35	48	135
2	Uzbekistan (UZB)	14	8	12	34
3	Mongolia (MGL)	13	12	11	36
4	Turkmenistan (TKM)	8	12	6	26
5	Kyrgyzstan (KGZ)	8	5	10	23
6	Kazakhstan (KAZ)	7	7	15	29
7	Thailand (THA)	7	7	14	28
8	Philippines (PHI)	7	4	13	24
9	Malaysia (MAS)	6	8	9	23
10	Iran (IRI)	6	6	11	23
11	France (FRA)	6	5	6	17
12	China (CHN)	5	6	7	18
12	Vietnam (VIE)	5	6	7	18
14	Chinese Taipei (TPE)	4	5	17	26
15	Hong Kong (HKG)	4	5	7	16
16	Singapore (SIN)	4	5	3	12
17	Japan (JPN)	4	4	9	17
18	Kenya (KEN)	3	2	5	10
19	Indonesia (INA)	2	6	7	15
20	Colombia (COL)	2	3	2	7
20	Nepal (NEP)	2	3	2	7
22	Brazil (BRA)	2	0	0	2
22	Israel (ISR)	2	0	0	2
22	Mali (MLI)	2	0	0	2
25	Russia (RUS)	1	6	7	14
26	India (IND)	1	2	10	13
27	Canada (CAN)	1	2	3	6
27	Turkey (TUR)	1	2	3	6
29	Poland (POL)	1	2	2	5
30	Mauritius (MRI)	1	2	0	3
31	Ghana (GHA)	1	1	3	5
31	Jordan (JOR)	1	1	3	5
33	United States (USA)	1	1	2	4
34	Morocco (MAR)	1	1	1	3
34	Serbia (SRB)	1	1	1	3
36	Cambodia (CAM)	1	0	5	6
37	Mexico (MEX)	1	0	1	2
38	Belgium (BEL)	1	0	0	1
38	Brunei (BRU)	1	0	0	1
38	Germany (GER)	1	0	0	1
41	Spain (ESP)	0	2	2	4
41	United Arab Emirates (UAE)	0	2	2	4
43	Romania (ROU)	0	2	1	3
44	Australia (AUS)	0	1	2	3
45	Sri Lanka (SRI)	0	1	1	2
45	Switzerland (SUI)	0	1	1	2
47	Bulgaria (BUL)	0	1	0	1
47	Costa Rica (CRC)	0	1	0	1
47	Czech Republic (CZE)	0	1	0	1
47	Dominican Republic (DOM)	0	1	0	1
47	Estonia (EST)	0	1	0	1
47	Greece (GRE)	0	1	0	1
47	Peru (PER)	0	1	0	1
54	Afghanistan (AFG)	0	0	5	5
55	Italy (ITA)	0	0	4	4
56	Paraguay (PAR)	0	0	2	2
56	Portugal (POR)	0	0	2	2
58	Algeria (ALG)	0	0	1	1
58	Austria (AUT)	0	0	1	1
58	Congo (CGO)	0	0	1	1
58	Denmark (DEN)	0	0	1	1
58	Finland (FIN)	0	0	1	1
58	Great Britain (GBR)	0	0	1	1
58	Kuwait (KUW)	0	0	1	1
58	Netherlands (NED)	0	0	1	1
58	Saudi Arabia (KSA)	0	0	1	1
58	Tajikistan (TJK)	0	0	1	1
58	Tunisia (TUN)	0	0	1	1
58	Ukraine (UKR)	0	0	1	1
Totals (69 entries)		191	191	296	678

=== 2019 Medals (GAISF) ===
Rank	Nation	Gold	Silver	Bronze	Total
1	Turkmenistan (TKM)	8	7	4	19
2	South Korea (KOR)	7	7	17	31
3	Mongolia (MGL)	7	5	6	18
4	Kyrgyzstan (KGZ)	7	3	6	16
5	Kazakhstan (KAZ)	5	5	6	16
6	France (FRA)	5	5	2	12
7	Hong Kong (HKG)	4	5	7	16
8	Malaysia (MAS)	4	5	2	11
9	Thailand (THA)	3	2	5	10
10	Japan (JPN)	3	2	3	8
11	Iran (IRI)	3	0	5	8
12	Chinese Taipei (TPE)	2	3	9	14
13	Colombia (COL)	2	3	2	7
14	Vietnam (VIE)	2	2	1	5
15	Philippines (PHI)	2	1	7	10
16	China (CHN)	2	0	1	3
17	Israel (ISR)	2	0	0	2
17	Mali (MLI)	2	0	0	2
19	Russia (RUS)	1	5	4	10
20	Uzbekistan (UZB)	1	2	3	6
21	Poland (POL)	1	2	2	5
22	Mauritius (MRI)	1	2	0	3
23	Canada (CAN)	1	1	3	5
23	Jordan (JOR)	1	1	3	5
25	Morocco (MAR)	1	1	1	3
25	Serbia (SRB)	1	1	1	3
27	Mexico (MEX)	1	0	1	2
27	Turkey (TUR)	1	0	1	2
27	United States (USA)	1	0	1	2
30	Belgium (BEL)	1	0	0	1
30	Brazil (BRA)	1	0	0	1
30	Brunei (BRU)	1	0	0	1
30	Germany (GER)	1	0	0	1
34	United Arab Emirates (UAE)	0	2	2	4
35	Indonesia (INA)	0	2	1	3
35	Romania (ROU)	0	2	1	3
37	Australia (AUS)	0	1	2	3
38	Singapore (SIN)	0	1	1	2
39	Costa Rica (CRC)	0	1	0	1
39	Czech Republic (CZE)	0	1	0	1
39	Dominican Republic (DOM)	0	1	0	1
39	Estonia (EST)	0	1	0	1
39	Greece (GRE)	0	1	0	1
39	Peru (PER)	0	1	0	1
39	Spain (ESP)	0	1	0	1
46	Italy (ITA)	0	0	4	4
47	Afghanistan (AFG)	0	0	2	2
47	India (IND)	0	0	2	2
49	Algeria (ALG)	0	0	1	1
49	Finland (FIN)	0	0	1	1
49	Portugal (POR)	0	0	1	1
49	Tunisia (TUN)	0	0	1	1
49	Ukraine (UKR)	0	0	1	1
Totals (53 entries)		85	85	123	293

=== 2019 Medals (Non GAISF) ===
Rank	Nation	Gold	Silver	Bronze	Total
1	South Korea (KOR)	45	28	31	104
2	Uzbekistan (UZB)	13	6	9	28
3	Mongolia (MGL)	6	7	5	18
4	Philippines (PHI)	5	3	6	14
5	Thailand (THA)	4	5	9	18
6	Singapore (SIN)	4	4	2	10
7	China (CHN)	3	6	6	15
7	Iran (IRI)	3	6	6	15
9	Vietnam (VIE)	3	4	6	13
10	Kenya (KEN)	3	2	5	10
11	Indonesia (INA)	2	4	6	12
12	Malaysia (MAS)	2	3	7	12
13	Nepal (NEP)	2	3	2	7
14	Kazakhstan (KAZ)	2	2	9	13
15	Chinese Taipei (TPE)	2	2	8	12
16	India (IND)	1	2	8	11
17	Japan (JPN)	1	2	6	9
18	Kyrgyzstan (KGZ)	1	2	4	7
19	Ghana (GHA)	1	1	3	5
20	Cambodia (CAM)	1	0	5	6
21	France (FRA)	1	0	4	5
22	Brazil (BRA)	1	0	0	1
23	Turkmenistan (TKM)	0	5	2	7
24	Turkey (TUR)	0	2	2	4
25	Russia (RUS)	0	1	3	4
26	Spain (ESP)	0	1	2	3
27	Sri Lanka (SRI)	0	1	1	2
27	Switzerland (SUI)	0	1	1	2
27	United States (USA)	0	1	1	2
30	Bulgaria (BUL)	0	1	0	1
30	Canada (CAN)	0	1	0	1
32	Afghanistan (AFG)	0	0	3	3
33	Paraguay (PAR)	0	0	2	2
34	Austria (AUT)	0	0	1	1
34	Congo (CGO)	0	0	1	1
34	Denmark (DEN)	0	0	1	1
34	Great Britain (GBR)	0	0	1	1
34	Kuwait (KUW)	0	0	1	1
34	Netherlands (NED)	0	0	1	1
34	Portugal (POR)	0	0	1	1
34	Saudi Arabia (KSA)	0	0	1	1
34	Tajikistan (TJK)	0	0	1	1
Totals (42 entries)		106	106	173	385

=== 2019 Individual medals (Non GAISF) ===
==== Tong-II Moo-Doo ====
Category	Gold	Silver	Bronze
Women’s Bon	(Nepal) Manika Sunar	(Japan) Reina Shinohara	(Malaysia) Norlihawati Hajidan
Women’s Bon	(Nepal) Manika Sunar	(Japan) Reina Shinohara	(Kenya) Salma Ali Abdallah
Open Bon Basic Team	Philippines	Kenya	South Korea
Open Bon Basic Team	Philippines	Kenya	Paraguay
Men’s Sparring +90 kg	(Kenya) Gordon Ochieng	(South Korea) Ki Hoon Lee	
Men’s Sparring -60 kg	(Thailand) Sirirot Sinchaitan	(Philippines) Mharjude Delos Santos	(Austria) Ian Jihyeonggu Brandner
Men’s Sparring -60 kg	(Thailand) Sirirot Sinchaitan	(Philippines) Mharjude Delos Santos	(Japan) Michihiro Brian Nakajima (Arellano)
Men’s Sparring -70 kg	(Philippines) Rivier Desuyo	(Iran) Hassan Amjadizakele	(Kenya) Evans Odoury Owino
Men’s Sparring -70 kg	(Philippines) Rivier Desuyo	(Iran) Hassan Amjadizakele	(South Korea) Kyeom Jin Cho
Men’s Sparring -80 kg	(Iran) Mostafa Ghandian	(Philippines) Arnel Ano-Os	(Malaysia) Syed Muhammad Danial Syed Mazlam
Men’s Sparring -80 kg	(Iran) Mostafa Ghandian	(Philippines) Arnel Ano-Os	(Kenya) Elvis Malipe Ole Mpakuanik
Men’s Sparring -90 kg	(Iran) Mohammadreza Dolatiyan	(South Korea) Yong Sang Jo	(Kenya) Peter James Njuguna
Men’s Sparring -90 kg	(Iran) Mohammadreza Dolatiyan	(South Korea) Yong Sang Jo	(India) Shakir Ahmad Dar
Women’s Sparring -51 kg	(Philippines) Unjung Ai Moonville Estrabela	(Thailand) Nopparat Wilawan	(Kenya) Patricia Lucky Mbago
Women’s Sparring -51 kg	(Philippines) Unjung Ai Moonville Estrabela	(Thailand) Nopparat Wilawan	(Cambodia) Kimhouy Hong
Women’s Sparring +65 kg	(Thailand) Kachana Dawan	(Kenya) Rose Wacheke Muthui	(Paraguay) Ailin Micaela Valiente Paredes
Women’s Sparring +65 kg	(Thailand) Kachana Dawan	(Kenya) Rose Wacheke Muthui	(Philippines) Bianca Vanessa Falculan
Women’s Sparring -65 kg	(Kenya) Lona Apiyo Abiero	(Thailand) Nattakarn Khamsopmpond	(Japan) Mika Juliano
Women’s Sparring -65 kg	(Kenya) Lona Apiyo Abiero	(Thailand) Nattakarn Khamsopmpond	(Cambodia) Sreylin Sitha
Open Bon Weapon Team	Brazil	Philippines	South Korea
Open Bon Weapon Team	Brazil	Philippines	Thailand

==== Yongmudo ====
Category	Gold	Silver	Bronze
Men’s -60 kg	(Nepal) Rohan Guruwacharya	(Nepal) Bibek Maharjan	(Malaysia) Ramanan R Muralitharan
Men’s -60 kg	(Nepal) Rohan Guruwacharya	(Nepal) Bibek Maharjan	(Malaysia) Muhammad Nurhaziq Rusly
Men’s -65 kg	(South Korea) Min Hyeok Nam	(South Korea) Chang Dae Kim	(Indonesia) Firdaus
Men’s -65 kg	(South Korea) Min Hyeok Nam	(South Korea) Chang Dae Kim	(Malaysia) Danesh Murugan
Men’s -70 kg	(Uzbekistan) Otabek Fozilov	(Nepal) Roberto Kapali	(Uzbekistan) Abdulatif Khabibullaev
Men’s -70 kg	(Uzbekistan) Otabek Fozilov	(Nepal) Roberto Kapali	(Malaysia) Wan Indera Luthfi
Men’s -75 kg	(South Korea) Woo Jin Kim	(South Korea) Jae Hyun Lee	(Indonesia) Zulkifli Ago
Men’s -75 kg	(South Korea) Woo Jin Kim	(South Korea) Jae Hyun Lee	(Mongolia) Tserendorj Damdindorj
Men's -85 kg	(South Korea) Seong Min Lee	(Indonesia) Muhammad Ali Murtadho	(China) Yawen Wang
Men's -85 kg	(South Korea) Seong Min Lee	(Indonesia) Muhammad Ali Murtadho	(China) Dilong An
Men's -90 kg	(South Korea) Dong Hyuk Bae	(China) Zheng Yu Ting	(Iran) Reza Goodary
Men's +90 kg	(Iran) Arya Sheikh Hosseini	(South Korea) Jin Uoung Oh	(South Korea) Hee June Cho
Women's -55 kg	(South Korea) Soo Hyun Kim	(Japan) Kyoka Sugama	(Nepal) Sharmila Tamang
Women's -55 kg	(South Korea) Soo Hyun Kim	(Japan) Kyoka Sugama	(Japan) Akari Itohisa
Women's -60 kg	(South Korea) Song E Chea	(China) Xiaoshi Li	(South Korea) Seon Yeong Hwang
Women's -60 kg	(South Korea) Song E Chea	(China) Xiaoshi Li	(United States) Hyoseon Kim
Women's +60 kg	(South Korea) Min Hyeong Jang	(Nepal) Anu Maya Tamang	(Japan) Ami Unozawa

==== Kurash ====
Category	Gold	Silver	Bronze
Men's +100 kg	(Uzbekistan) Mukhsin Khisomiddinov	(Iran) Jafar Pahlevanijaghargh	(Republic of the Congo) Mbepa Gaulou Antony Desire
Men's +100 kg	(Uzbekistan) Mukhsin Khisomiddinov	(Iran) Jafar Pahlevanijaghargh	(Thailand) Kunathip Yea-On
Men's -60 kg	(Uzbekistan) Abror Jabborov	(Turkmenistan) Shamuhammet Kurbanov	(Afghanistan) Merajuddin Chakmar
Men's -60 kg	(Uzbekistan) Abror Jabborov	(Turkmenistan) Shamuhammet Kurbanov	(Chinese Taipei) Chen Lo
Men's -66 kg	(Japan) Eiki Goya	(Uzbekistan) Kabuljon Akhmedov	(Afghanistan) Shuaib Mohammad Yuosuf
Men's -66 kg	(Japan) Eiki Goya	(Uzbekistan) Kabuljon Akhmedov	(Kuwait) Umid Esanov
Men's -73 kg	(Uzbekistan) Umid Esanov	(Turkmenistan) Muhammet Temirov	(Chinese Taipei) Chia-Huang Lin
Men's -73 kg	(Uzbekistan) Umid Esanov	(Turkmenistan) Muhammet Temirov	(Japan) Wan Indera Luthfi
Men’s -78 kg	(South Korea) Wu Joo Lim	(Turkey) Nurcan Yilmaz	(India) Harpreet Kaur
Men’s -78 kg	(South Korea) Wu Joo Lim	(Turkey) Nurcan Yilmaz	(Chinese Taipei) Chia-Jing Kao
Women's -78 kg	(South Korea) Seong Min Lee	(Indonesia) Muhammad Ali Murtadho	(China) Yawen Wang
Women's -78 kg	(South Korea) Seong Min Lee	(Indonesia) Muhammad Ali Murtadho	(China) Dilong An
Women's -87 kg	(Mongolia) Nyamtuya Nyamkhuu	(India) Jyoti	(South Korea) Pu Reum Lee
Women's -87 kg	(Mongolia) Nyamtuya Nyamkhuu	(India) Jyoti	(Uzbekistan) Rakhima Yuldasheva
Women's +87 kg	(Chinese Taipei) Pei-Yu Sun	(Uzbekistan) Rinata Ilmatova	(South Korea) Tae Yeon Kim
Women's +87 kg	(Chinese Taipei) Pei-Yu Sun	(Uzbekistan) Rinata Ilmatova	(Thailand) Pattamaporn Tubkit
Men's -81 kg	(Uzbekistan) Sarvar Shomurodov	(Iran) Elyas Ali Akbari	(Chinese Taipei) Chun-Ta Huang
Men's -81 kg	(Uzbekistan) Sarvar Shomurodov	(Iran) Elyas Ali Akbari	(Tajikistan) Khaknazar Nazarov
Men's -90 kg	(Uzbekistan) Shermukhammad Jandriev	(Iran) Omid Taztak	(France) Alexis Plantard
Men's -90 kg	(Uzbekistan) Shermukhammad Jandriev	(Iran) Omid Taztak	(Afghanistan) Ajmal Ishaq Zai
Women's -57 kg	(South Korea) Hyeon Jeong Lee	(Turkmenistan) Gulshat Nasyrova	(Thailand) Saowalak Homklin
Women's -57 kg	(South Korea) Hyeon Jeong Lee	(Turkmenistan) Gulshat Nasyrova	(Uzbekistan) Srisahakit Ornawee
Women's -63 kg	(Chinese Taipei) Yu-Ching Cheng	(Turkmenistan) Dinara Hallyeva	(South Korea) Ji Won Park
Women's -63 kg	(Chinese Taipei) Yu-Ching Cheng	(Turkmenistan) Dinara Hallyeva	(Indonesia) Khasani Najmu Shifa
Women's -70 kg	(Uzbekistan) Filura Ergasheva	(Indonesia) Siti Latifah	(Turkmenistan) Maria Lohova
Women's -70 kg	(Uzbekistan) Filura Ergasheva	(Indonesia) Siti Latifah	(Chinese Taipei) Chia-Ling Liu
Men's -100 kg	(Uzbekistan) Erkin Doniyorov	(Iran) Hamed Rashidi	(South Korea) Jea Min Kim
Men's -100 kg	(Uzbekistan) Erkin Doniyorov	(Iran) Hamed Rashidi	(Vietnam) Hoang Duong Nguyen
Women's -48 kg	(Uzbekistan) Mokhinur Muminova	(Mongolia) Nurzedmaa Erdenedalai	(Chinese Taipei) Chia-Wen Tsou
Women's -48 kg	(Uzbekistan) Mokhinur Muminova	(Mongolia) Nurzedmaa Erdenedalai	(Turkmenistan) Ayshirin Haydarova
Women's -52 kg	(Uzbekistan) Gulnor Sulaymanova	(Turkmenistan) Aynur Amanova	(Chinese Taipei) Tzu-Yi Hung
Women's -52 kg	(Uzbekistan) Gulnor Sulaymanova	(Turkmenistan) Aynur Amanova	(South Korea) Kyeong Ha Lee

==== Korean Hapkido ====
Category	Gold	Silver	Bronze
Men's Sparring -70 kg	(South Korea) Lee GaOn	(Iran) Khantabarshiadeh	(South Korea) Jo SeongIk
Men's Sparring -70 kg	(South Korea) Lee GaOn	(Iran) Khantabarshiadeh	(Switzerland) Dervillez Jeremie
Men's Sparring +80 kg	(South Korea) Yang JiSeok	(South Korea) Kim YeongSeo	(India) Vikramjit Singn
Men's Sparring +80 kg	(South Korea) Yang JiSeok	(South Korea) Kim YeongSeo	(Spain) Quintero Ruben
Men's -66 kg	(France) Trouv Julien/ Mickael Pipier	(South Korea) Pyo JunHui / An SangNo	(Spain) Ruben Gonzalez / Daniel Sanz
Men's -66 kg	(France) Trouv Julien/ Mickael Pipier	(South Korea) Pyo JunHui / An SangNo	(South Korea) Lee UnSeok / Sin ILGyeong
Women's Self-defense	(South Korea) Lee Sugyeong / Bak Sujin	(Switzerland) Dutoit Julie / Racine Valentin	(Russia) Elena Kossova / Macles Kudta
Women's Self-defense	(South Korea) Lee Sugyeong / Bak Sujin	(Switzerland) Dutoit Julie / Racine Valentin	(Uzbekistan) Akimjon Akimhjonova / Yuldashev Dostond
Women's sparing -65 kg	(South Korea) Lee Sumin	(South Korea) Bak Yewon	(South Korea) Kim Gahyeon
Women's sparing -65 kg	(South Korea) Lee Sumin	(South Korea) Bak Yewon	(Kazakhstan) Zholdybayeva Aruzhan
Men's Self-defense(Basic)	(South Korea) Lee Jae Hyuk / Lee Ha-Neul	(Spain) Quintero Ruben / Balaguer Cristian	(India) Singh Vikramjit / Mollah Wasim Akram
Men's Self-defense(Basic)	(South Korea) Lee Jae Hyuk / Lee Ha-Neul	(Spain) Quintero Ruben / Balaguer Cristian	(France) Perreaut Maxim / Grosjean Victor
Men's Sparring -80 kg	(South Korea) Lee Daehwan	(South Korea) Eom Hyeonsik	(Portugal) Nercio Tiago
Men's Sparring -80 kg	(South Korea) Lee Daehwan	(South Korea) Eom Hyeonsik	(Iran) Hashempour Pashaki Younes
Men's Sparring -60 kg	(South Korea) No SuChan	(South Korea) Hong HyeokJun	(India) Dutta Arnav
Men's Sparring -60 kg	(South Korea) No SuChan	(South Korea) Hong HyeokJun	(Iran) Shojaei Shal Reza
Women's Sparring +65 kg	(Kazakhstan) Zhumatav Guldana	(South Korea) Yeon Ji Woo	(India) Paul Debolina
Women's Sparring +65 kg	(Kazakhstan) Zhumatav Guldana	(South Korea) Yeon Ji Woo	(South Korea) Kim YeJin

==== Kabaddi ====
Category	Gold	Silver	Bronze
Men -85 kg	Team South Korea	(Chinese Taipei) Team Taipei	Team Indonesia
Men -85 kg	Team South Korea	(Chinese Taipei) Team Taipei	Team Japan
Women -70 kg	Team South Korea	(Chinese Taipei) Team Taipei	Team Sri Lanka
Women -70 kg	Team South Korea	(Chinese Taipei) Team Taipei	Team Nepal

==== Pencak Silat ====
Category	Gold	Silver	Bronze
Men's Tanding Class B(50~55 kg)	(Indonesia) Hidayat Limonu	(Singapore) Muhammad Hazim Mohamad Yusli	(Vietnam) Tuan Nguyen Dinh
Men's Tanding Class B(50~55 kg)	(Indonesia) Hidayat Limonu	(Singapore) Muhammad Hazim Mohamad Yusli	(Philippines) Jaciren Abad
Men's Tanding Class C(55~60 kg)	(India) Swapnil Ramchandra Late	(South Korea) Kim Junsu	(Kazakhstan) Zhandos Madekhiyanov
Men's Tanding Class C(55~60 kg)	(India) Swapnil Ramchandra Late	(South Korea) Kim Junsu	(Kyrgyzstan) Kochkorov Zamirbek
Men's Tanding Class D(60~65 kg)	(Vietnam) Toan Nguyen Ngoc	(Singapore) Abdul Raazaq Abdul Rashid	(Philippines) Ian Christopher Calo
Men's Tanding Class D(60~65 kg)	(Vietnam) Toan Nguyen Ngoc	(Singapore) Abdul Raazaq Abdul Rashid	(Thailand) Rolsamang Kajay
Men's Tanding Class E(65~70 kg)	(South Korea) Jungwan Park	(Kyrgyzstan) Nurbek Asanov	(India) Anshul Arun Kamble
Men's Tanding Class E(65~70 kg)	(South Korea) Jungwan Park	(Kyrgyzstan) Nurbek Asanov	(Kazakhstan) Nurbek Kabdrakhmanov
Men's Tanding Class F(70~75 kg)	(Kyrgyzstan) Timur Mamatisakov	(South Korea) Junhwan O	(China) Cheng Zhen
Men's Tanding Class F(70~75 kg)	(Kyrgyzstan) Timur Mamatisakov	(South Korea) Junhwan O	(Chinese Taipei) Jian-Ren Chen
Men's Tanding Class G(75~80 kg)	(Singapore) Muhammad Syakir Jeffry	(Vietnam) Thanh Truong	(Philippines) Raymund Bueno
Men's Tanding Class G(75~80 kg)	(Singapore) Muhammad Syakir Jeffry	(Vietnam) Thanh Truong	(Thailand) Arnon Kamsim
Men's Tanding Class H(80~85 kg)	(Thailand) Pimpirat Tonkhieo	(Vietnam) Tuyen Nguyen Duy	(Kazakhstan) Temerlan Yessengeldin
Men's Tanding Class H(80~85 kg)	(Thailand) Pimpirat Tonkhieo	(Vietnam) Tuyen Nguyen Duy	(China) Yongming Shi
Men's Tanding Class I(85~90 kg)	(Singapore) Sheik Ferdous Sheik Alau'ddin	(Thailand) Sakdithat Waiyaphon	(China) Ming Liu
Men's Tanding Class I(85~90 kg)	(Singapore) Sheik Ferdous Sheik Alau'ddin	(Thailand) Sakdithat Waiyaphon	(Kazakhstan) Sarvarkhom Ikramov
Men's Tanding Class J(90~95 kg)	(Vietnam) Tri Nguyen Van	(Singapore) Danial Hamezi Mohd Nazri	(Kyrgyzstan) Ilimbek Toktugulov
Men's Tanding Class J(90~95 kg)	(Vietnam) Tri Nguyen Van	(Singapore) Danial Hamezi Mohd Nazri	(Thailand) Sitthiporn Makkluen
Women's Tanding Class B(50~55 kg)	(Vietnam) Lan Nguyen Thi Mai	(Indonesia) Nadia Haq Umami Nur Cahyani	(Thailand) Suda Lueangaphichatkun
Women's Tanding Class B(50~55 kg)	(Vietnam) Lan Nguyen Thi Mai	(Indonesia) Nadia Haq Umami Nur Cahyani	(South Korea) Yunjin Lee
Women's Tanding Class C(55~65 kg)	(Indonesia) Jeni Elvis Kause	(Thailand) Suwaphat Phongamwong	(Vietnam) Them Tran Thi
Women's Tanding Class C(55~65 kg)	(Indonesia) Jeni Elvis Kause	(Thailand) Suwaphat Phongamwong	(Kazakhstan) Azada Anarmetova
Men's Seni Single	(Singapore) Abdul Rahman Muhammad Iqbal	(Thailand) Sadara Ilyas	(Indonesia) Sulistianto Dino Bima
Men's Seni Double	(Philippines) Abad Almohaidib / Abad Alfau Jan	(Indonesia) Setiadi Dede / Faletehan Haidir Agung	(Thailand) Jeh-Ae Chuwaidi / Cheni Sobri
Women's Seni Double	(Thailand) Samahoh Yuweeta / Chearbuli Ruhana	(Singapore) Ismail Nur Azlyana / Shahrudin Nurhanishah	(Philippines) Beato Jeremae / Jalandoni Mitz Jude
TUNGGAL Women's Seni	(Singapore) Mohammad Yazid Nurzuhairah	(Vietnam) Vuong Thi Binh	(Indonesia) Sari Puspa Arum

==== Ssireum ====
Category	Gold	Silver	Bronze
Men's Individual -60 kg	(South Korea) Suk Kyu Maeng	(Mongolia) Dashbyamba Ganbaatar	(South Korea) Seungdo Yu
Men's Individual -70 kg	(South Korea) Joon Hwan Jang	(South Korea) Hyun Jin An	(Kyrgyzstan) Turganboi Usmanov
Men's Individual -70 kg	(South Korea) Joon Hwan Jang	(South Korea) Hyun Jin An	(Iran) Amir Hossein Ghajar
Men's Individual -75 kg	(South Korea) Sung Ha Hwang	(Kyrgyzstan) Sergey Lim	(Ghana) Samuel Koffle
Men's Individual -75 kg	(South Korea) Sung Ha Hwang	(Kyrgyzstan) Sergey Lim	(India) Sanjeev Kumar
Men's Individual -80 kg	(South Korea) Jong Gul Im	(South Korea) Bong Sik Park	(Kyrgyzstan) Alikhan Dzhumadylov
Men's Individual -80 kg	(South Korea) Jong Gul Im	(South Korea) Bong Sik Park	(Ghana) Richard Hammond
Men's Individual -90 kg	(South Korea) Bum Soo Noh	(Kazakhstan) Dias Shakenov	(South Korea) Yoon Soo Kim
Men's Individual -90 kg	(South Korea) Bum Soo Noh	(Kazakhstan) Dias Shakenov	(Iran) Mohsen Bakhsheai
Men's Individual -105 kg	(South Korea) Tae Ha Kim	(Mongolia) Tumendemberel Bulgan-Erdene	(Mongolia) Garmaa Munkhbaatar
Men's Individual -105 kg	(South Korea) Tae Ha Kim	(Mongolia) Tumendemberel Bulgan-Erdene	(China) Xuanchen Jin
Men's Individual -130 kg	(South Korea) Kuk Hee Lee	(Mongolia) Darmaa Tamir	(Russia) Evgenii Alekseev
Men's Individual -130 kg	(South Korea) Kuk Hee Lee	(Mongolia) Darmaa Tamir	(South Korea) Sung Bum Song
Men's Individual Unlimited	(South Korea) Chan Joo Park	(Mongolia) Khangai Orgikh	(Iran) Jafar Pahlevanijaghargh
Men's Individual Unlimited	(South Korea) Chan Joo Park	(Mongolia) Khangai Orgikh	(Russia) Uvar Timofeev

==== Taekkyeon ====
Category	Gold	Silver	Bronze
Men’s Matseogi -70 kg	(South Korea) Min Seong Kim	(Sri Lanka) Suranjan	(Uzbekistan) Yuldashev Donstonbek
Men’s Matseogi -70 kg	(South Korea) Min Seong Kim	(Sri Lanka) Suranjan	(France) Dalleves Eric
Men’s Matseogi -75 kg	(South Korea) Nu Ri Han	(Ghana) Charles	(Philippines) Bryan Gonzale
Men’s Matseogi -75 kg	(South Korea) Nu Ri Han	(Ghana) Charles	(Uzbekistan) Turgunov Akhmadjon
Men’s Matseogi -81 kg	(South Korea) Sang Beom Han	(South Korea) Ji Hyung Kin	(Ghana) Richard Hammond
Men’s Matseogi -81 kg	(South Korea) Sang Beom Han	(South Korea) Ji Hyung Kin	(Netherlands) Kloof Jurgen Randall
Men’s Matseogi +82 kg	(South Korea) Seok Young Chun	(South Korea) Jae Wan Jang	(United Kingdom) Eduardo Felipe
Men’s Matseogi +82 kg	(South Korea) Seok Young Chun	(South Korea) Jae Wan Jang	(France) Gibelin Baptiste
Men’s Matseogi Unlimited	(South Korea) Seokyeong Cheon	(South Korea) Minseong Kim	(South Korea) Nuri Han
Men’s Matseogi Unlimited	(South Korea) Seokyeong Cheon	(South Korea) Minseong Kim	(South Korea) Sangbeom Han
Women’s Matseogi Unlimited	(Ghana) Cynthia Kafui Dotsey	(Russia) Elena Koccova	(Cambodia) Khiev Chendaroth
Women’s Matseogi Unlimited	(Ghana) Cynthia Kafui Dotsey	(Russia) Elena Koccova	(South Korea) Ye Seong Han
Butboegi Individual	(Cambodia) Khiew Chendaroth	(Uzbekistan) Yuldashev Donstonbek	(Denmark) Benny Henrik
Makboegi Team	South Korea Team Women	South Korea Team Men	Malaysia Team

==== Horseback Archery ====
Category	Gold	Silver	Bronze
Masahee	South Korea	United States of America	Kazakhstan
Single Shot Individual	(Mongolia) Erdenesuvd Erdene	(Mongolia) Lee Seung Ho	(South Korea) Puntsagdorj Purev_ochir
Single Shot Team	Mongolia	Malaysia	Kazakhstan
Double Shot Individual	(Mongolia) Nachinbavuu Davaadorj (Tegshee)	(Turkey) Omer Atar	(Mongolia) Puntsagdorj Purev_ochir
Double Shot Team	Mongolia	South Korea	Kazakhstan
Serial Shot Individual	(Malaysia) Erina Emelina Binti Ismail	(Malaysia) Mohamad Safwan Bin Abdul Rahid	(Mongolia) Gombo Purevmandakh
Serial Shot Team	Malaysia	Canada	Mongolia
Quabaque individual	(South Korea) Lee Seung Ho	(Kazakhstan) Eralhan Aikoz	(Turkey) Ibrahim Alperen Alkan
Quabaque Team	Kazakhstan	South Korea	Saudi Arabia
Kazakh Style	(Mongolia) Erdenesuvd Erdene	(Mongolia) Gantumur Iderbaatar	(Turkey) Ibrahim Alperen Alkan

==== Martial Arts Show ====
Category	Gold	Silver	Bronze
Men's Single Tricking	(South Korea) Kim Hyun Bin	(South Korea) Pyeon Jung Beom	(South Korea) Jeong Eo Jin
Duo Weapon	(Uzbekistan) Jang Sanati Association	(China) Guangzhou Physica Institute of Physical Education	(Vietnam) Vietnamese Traditional Marts Arts Federation
Single Shot Team	Mongolia	Malaysia	Kazakhstan
Double Shot Individual	(Mongolia) Nachinbavuu Davaadorj (Tegshee)	(Turkey) Omer Atar	(Mongolia) Puntsagdorj Purev_ochir
Women's Single Weapon	(China) Yanmei Wu	(China) Tingting Zhang	(Vietnam) Tuyet Vy Lam
Men's Single Weapon	(China) Jiasheng Huang	(India) Yumnam Dejen Singh	(Singapore) Nujaid Hasif Zainal Abidin
Duo Bare hands	(South Korea) Lexma	(Bulgaria) National Federation Bulgarian Kempo (BULKEMPO)	(Vietnam) Vietnamese Traditional Marts Arts Federation
Women's Single Bare hands	(China) Lihua Zhang	(Vietnam) Hoang Trang Nguyen	(Singapore) Nurzianah Mord Yazid
Men's Single Bare hands	(South Korea) Lim Hyun Joon	(China) Jun Cao	(Cambodia) Ponler Pech
Group	(South Korea) Mirme	(China) Guangzhou Physica Institute of Physical Education	(South Korea) Lion Hapkido

==== Martial Arts Record Contest ====
Category	Gold	Silver	Bronze
Men's High-jump Kick	(South Korea) Kim Pyong Suk	(Uzbekistan) Jasurbek Serikboev	(South Korea) Lee Joo Ho
Men's Long-jump Kick	(Kenya) Edwin Musungi Otota	(South Korea) Jang Han Wook	(South Korea) Jang Han Soo
Women's High-jump Kick	(Uzbekistan) Shakhrizoda Kodirkulova	(Uzbekistan) Dilnoza Serikbayeva	(South Korea) Kwon Soo Min
Women's Long-jump Kick	(Uzbekistan) Zukhrakhon Umirzakhova	(South Korea) Park Haneul	(Uzbekistan) Sarvinoz Khabibullayeva
Men's Fist Breaking	(South Korea) Choi Min Suk	(South Korea) Jung Sang Min	(South Korea) Kim Sung Yong
Men's High-jump Fall	(South Korea) Jang Han Soo	(South Korea) Jang Han Wook	(South Korea) Choi Won Suk
Men's Long-jump Fall	(South Korea) Jang Han Wook	(South Korea) Jang Han Soo	(South Korea) Kim Pyong Suk
Women's High-jump Fall	(South Korea) Kim Min Ju	(Uzbekistan) Sevinch Uralova	(South Korea) Dilnoza Serikbayeva
Women's Long-jump Fall	(South Korea) Kim Min Ju	(South Korea) Kwon Soo Min	(Uzbekistan) Shakhrizoda Kodirkulova

== 2017 Youth Competition ==
This games was held in 3-7 Nonember in 2017.

=== Sports ===
- Hapkido
- Kurash
- Muaythai
- Yongmudo
- Martial Arts Record Contest (RC)
- Martial Arts Show (MS)

=== Medals ===
Rank	Nation	Gold	Silver	Bronze	Total
1	South Korea (KOR)	59	44	39	142
2	Philippines (PHI)	6	2	4	12
3	Nepal (NEP)	3	8	11	22
4	Iran (IRI)	3	4	7	14
5	Vietnam (VIE)	3	1	3	7
6	Afghanistan (AFG)	3	1	2	6
6	Thailand (THA)	3	1	2	6
8	Malaysia (MAS)	2	3	0	5
9	Chinese Taipei (TPE)	1	4	6	11
10	India (IND)	0	5	11	16
11	Mongolia (MGL)	0	3	2	5
12	Japan (JPN)	0	2	1	3
13	Pakistan (PAK)	0	1	1	2
13	Singapore (SIN)	0	1	1	2
15	China (CHN)	0	0	2	2
16	New Zealand (NZL)	0	0	1	1
Totals (16 entries)		83	80	93	256

== 2021 Online Games ==
=== Sports ===
http://online.mastership.org/en/schedule/ranking_event.jsp

GAISF Events (15):

- Judo (5)
- Muaythai (6)
- Taekwondo (4)

Non GAISF Events (42):

- e Martial Arts (0)
- Kendo (0)
- Korean Hapkido (5)
- Kurash (6)
- Taekkyeon (8)
- Yongmudo (8)
- Tong-Il Moo-Do (8)
- Martial Arts Show (7)

=== 2021 Medals (GAISF and Non GAISF) ===
http://online.mastership.org/en/schedule/ranking_noc.jsp

Rank	Nation	Gold	Silver	Bronze	Total
1	South Korea (KOR)	27	14	32	73
2	Philippines (PHI)	9	7	7	23
3	Vietnam (VIE)	5	7	4	16
4	Cambodia (CAM)	3	2	1	6
5	Iran (IRI)	2	1	8	11
6	Chinese Taipei (TPE)	1	6	0	7
7	India (IND)	1	3	4	8
8	Japan (JPN)	1	2	0	3
9	Thailand (THA)	1	1	7	9
10	Uzbekistan (UZB)	1	0	5	6
11	Malaysia (MAS)	1	0	4	5
12	Singapore (SIN)	1	0	2	3
13	Palestine (PLE)	1	0	1	2
14	Argentina (ARG)	1	0	0	1
14	Austria (AUT)	1	0	0	1
14	Brazil (BRA)	1	0	0	1
17	France (FRA)	0	6	1	7
18	Czech Republic (CZE)	0	1	2	3
19	Indonesia (INA)	0	1	1	2
19	Nepal (NEP)	0	1	1	2
19	Peru (PER)	0	1	1	2
19	Trinidad and Tobago (TTO)	0	1	1	2
23	Israel (ISR)	0	1	0	1
23	Laos (LAO)	0	1	0	1
23	Netherlands (NED)	0	1	0	1
23	Poland (POL)	0	1	0	1
27	Spain (ESP)	0	0	4	4
28	Ghana (GHA)	0	0	3	3
28	Hong Kong (HKG)	0	0	3	3
30	Germany (GER)	0	0	2	2
30	Mexico (MEX)	0	0	2	2
30	Paraguay (PAR)	0	0	2	2
30	Sri Lanka (SRI)	0	0	2	2
34	Australia (AUS)	0	0	1	1
34	Greece (GRE)	0	0	1	1
34	Lithuania (LTU)	0	0	1	1
34	Nicaragua (NIC)	0	0	1	1
34	Portugal (POR)	0	0	1	1
34	Qatar (QAT)	0	0	1	1
34	United States (USA)	0	0	1	1
34	Zambia (ZAM)	0	0	1	1
42	Canada (CAN)	0	0	0	0
42	China (CHN)	0	0	0	0
42	Congo (CGO)	0	0	0	0
42	Great Britain (GBR)	0	0	0	0
42	Haiti (HAI)	0	0	0	0
42	Hungary (HUN)	0	0	0	0
42	Iraq (IRQ)	0	0	0	0
42	Kenya (KEN)	0	0	0	0
42	Mauritius (MRI)	0	0	0	0
42	Moldova (MDA)	0	0	0	0
42	Mongolia (MGL)	0	0	0	0
42	Morocco (MAR)	0	0	0	0
42	Switzerland (SUI)	0	0	0	0
Totals (54 entries)		57	58	108	223

== See also ==
- World Combat Games
- Hyeong
