= Mike Leeder =

English casting director, producer, and director

Mike Leeder (born 5 August 1968, in Croydon, England) is an English casting director, producer and actor based in Hong Kong. Leeder has been responsible for DVD and Blu-ray special features for many Hong Kong productions. He worked on such projects as Fearless (2006), The Raid 2 (2014), The Man with the Iron Fists (2012), Man of Tai Chi (2013), Ultimate Justice (2016), Rogue One: A Star Wars Story (2016), Chasing the Dragon (2017) and Donnie Yen's Big Brother (2018).

== Career ==
=== Content production ===
Leeder has worked in Asia and internationally as a casting director and consultant, projects such as Rogue One: A Star Wars Story, Jet Li's Fearless, Jackie Chan's Rush Hour 3 and CZ 12: Chinese Zodiac, RZA's The Man with the Iron Fists part 1 & 2, Keanu Reeves directorial debut Man of Tai Chi, various projects for HBOAsia including Serangoon Road & Grace, the Resident Evil franchise, the Ip Man series, Donnie Yen's Chasing the Dragon & Big Brother, Blood the Last Vampire, Yuen Woo-ping's True Legend, the black comedy Stegman is Dead, the BBC's ill-fated Phoo Action, and martial arts adventure Triple Threat.

Leeder's credits as a stunt liaison include The Mummy: Tomb of the Dragon Emperor working with Vic Armstrong, The Raid 2 working with Gareth Evans and Bruce Law Stunts Unlimited, Pound of Flesh, Abduction and Ultimate Justice.

As a producer, Leeder's credits include indie action movies The Silencer, Ten Dead Men, George Clarke's killer clown thriller Splash Area, Ross Clarkson's psychological thriller Captured, Albert Pyun's Interstellar Civil War, the Australian TV series Tiger Cops, Ernie Barbarash's Pound of Flesh starring Jean-Claude Van Damme and Abduction starring Scott Adkins and Andy On, Noriko the Hong Kong Dead, 12/Underground starring Mark Strange and The Bodyguard: A New Beginning as well as the documentary Neon Grindhouse: Hong Kong.

Leeder refers to himself as an occasional actor, having played minor roles in such projects as Once Upon a Time in China 1 & 2, Jackie Chan's City Hunter, the Sad Story of Saigon, and larger supporting roles in such projects as Fearless, Helios, Ultimate Justice, The Path to the Dream, Nightfall, Mission Milano, Chasing the Dragon, Big Brother, HBO Asia's Sent, Pound of Flesh and Abduction.

Leeder was one of the founding partners in the Hong Kong/German independent production company Silent Partners, producing indie action movies One Million Klicks starring German martial arts sensation Mike Moeller, and the dark thriller Ultimate Justice starring Mark Dacascos, Matthias Hues and Mike Moeller. Leeder left the company in 2017, citing ongoing creative differences with his co-founder over the direction the company was heading, and that the way Ultimate Justice was altered in post-production did not match the original vision or plan for the movie.

Leeder was the co-founder of Silent Partners, the production company responsible for One Million Klicks and Ultimate Justice. Leeder left the company in 2017, citing ongoing creative differences with his co-founder over company direction.

Leeder's most recent projects include Ip Man 4: The Finale, Echo 8, and Lockdown.
