= Mark Noyce =

English martial artist, actor and director

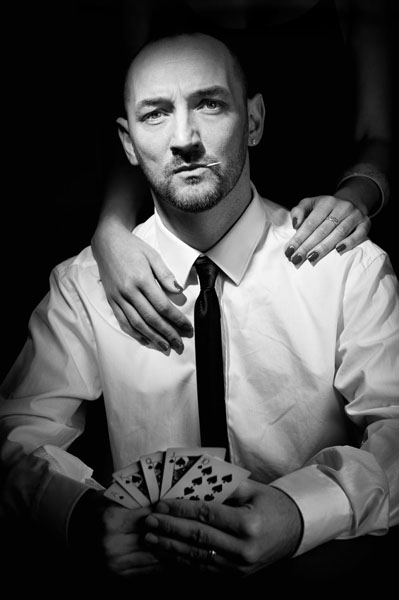
- Noyce in character as the poker player
- Born: Mark William Arthur Noyce; 3 March 1974 (age 51); Peterborough, Cambridgeshire, England
- Occupation(s): Actor, director, producer, screenwriter
- Spouse: Nicola Noyce (2000–present)
- Website: www.marknoyce.com

Mark Noyce (born 3 March 1974) is an English actor, writer, film director and producer, and former martial artist.

== Early life ==
Noyce was born in Peterborough, Cambridgeshire. He received his secondary education at Walton Community School before moving on to Peterborough Regional College.

== Martial arts career ==
Noyce first started training in the Lau Gar style of Kung-Fu at the age of 6 after his father had seen Enter the Dragon starring Bruce Lee. He appeared on the competitive scene in the early 1980s and retired at the age of 24 as world forms champion. He was quoted as saying, "I knew I’d peaked and was really struggling to motivate myself so it was definitely the right thing to do."

=== Partial martial arts accomplishments ===
- International Chinese Kung Fu World forms champion
- WUMA World forms champion
- World classic forms champion
- World Kickboxing Association British champion
- Martial arts illustrated competitor of the year
- MAI series forms champion
- FSK (freestyle sport karate) forms champion
- Ricochet forms champion
- Martial arts illustrated forms competitor of the year

Noyce has been awarded a black belt in kung fu, karate, tang soo do and Mugendo kickboxing.

=== Product endorsements ===
Noyce has appeared in a series of events promoting Tracks2000 gym equipment after working with the development team. He helped design equipment which would aid martial artists wanting to learn acrobatics.

== Film career ==
Noyce began his career working on numerous shorts and feature films, often in small or supporting artist roles. Some of these include Nativity, Pimp, Killer Bitch, I against I and The Landlord. He made his directorial debut with the comedy On the Ropes in 2011; he also wrote the script and played the lead role of Keith Kraft.

In reference to his lead role, Mark Boosey, The British Comedy Guide editor, wrote, "This monstrous egocentric 'plonker' carries many of the film's best lines and set pieces, and is played very well by the film's creator, Mark Noyce". Britflicks critic Zachary Cooke said "films that are starring, written and directed by the same person are usually a no no, with on the Ropes this is not the case". Richard Cross of A Full Tank of Gas stated, "On the Ropes is one of those films that succeeds in spite of the nature of the British film industry and its financing rather than because of it, and Noyce is to be congratulated simply for getting the film made. That he also provides the audience with a high quality of comic entertainment is an unexpected bonus".

During a 2012 interview Shaun Williamson stated "I'm working with Mark Noyce on a film called This Is Jayde: The One Hit Wonder" and that he was "appearing as a twisted Simon Cowell version of myself. Should be fun!" A video was later released announcing further information about the film's plot and characters.

Britflicks and The British Comedy Guide reported in August 2014 that Noyce had begun production on the comedy thriller The Blazing Cannons.

In June 2017 Noyce was directing the drama A Dish Served Cold, starring Steven Arnold and Shaun Williamson.

In 2017 Happy Pup Films announced that Noyce was working with Tim Selberg and Selberg Studio's on the horror feature Sammy. Producer and director, Noyce contacted the studio after seeing their work in Dead Silence and Goosebumps.

== Happy Pup Films ==
Noyce formed his film and television production company, Happy Pup Films, first producing the comedy film On the Ropes. The company is located in London.

== Filmography ==
=== Film ===
Year	Film	Role	Notes
2009	Sam Noir	Henchman	
2009	Nativity	Christmas Shopper	uncredited
2010	Pimp	Swinger	uncredited
2010	The Landlord	Warwick	
2010	Killer Bitch	Joe's Victim	
2010	I against I	Himself	
2011	On the Ropes	Keith Kraft	Also writer, producer and director
2012	Shaniqua (short)	Christian	Also writer
2014	This is Jayde: The One Hit Wonder	Jayde	Also writer, producer and director
2017	The Blazing Cannons	Saxon	Also writer and producer
2017	The N00bs	Chris	Also writer and producer
2017	Keeping It Up	Doug Deep	Also writer, producer and director
2017	A Dish Served Cold		Producer, director
2018	Sammy		Writer, producer and director
2018	The Influenced		Writer, producer and director
2018	Benny		Writer, producer and director

=== Television and theatre ===
Year	Programme/Show	Role	Notes
1995	Martial arts extravaganza	Stunt performer	
1996	Clash of the Titans	Stunt performer	
1998	Turandot	Executioner	Also choreographer
1999	Carmen	Fighter	Also choreographer
2000	Faust	Devil	Also choreographer
2009	Guinness World Records Smashed	Stunt performer	1 episode
