= Kuk Sool Won =

Korean Martial Arts

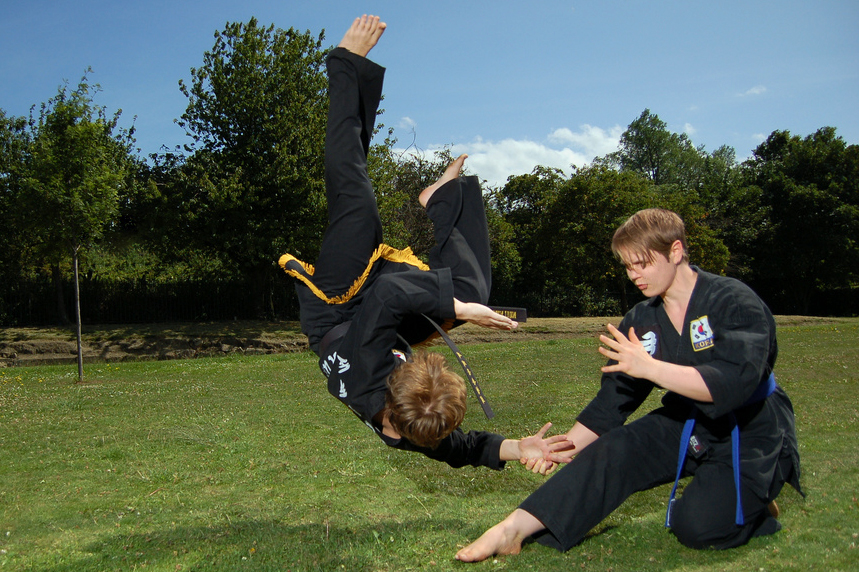
- Focus: Hybrid
- Country of origin: South Korea
- Creator: Suh In-hyuk
- Ancestor arts: Hapkido, Traditional Chinese martial arts
- Official website: http://www.kuksoolwon.com

Korean name
- Hangul: 국술원
- Hanja: 國術院
- RR: Guksurwon
- MR: Kuksurwŏn

Kuk Sool Won (Korean: 국술원; Hanja: 國術院) is a Korean martial art founded in 1958 by Suh In-hyuk (서인혁), referred to by the formal titles of Kuk Sa Nim (국사님, "national martial arts teacher") or Grandmaster.

Kuk Sool Won is practiced in various countries, with its largest bases in the United States and the United Kingdom. The Korean Kuk Sool Won Association, although related, is a separate entity.

== Overview ==
Kuk Sool Won incorporates physical training such as stretching exercises and cardiovascular conditioning. Kuk Sool Won also emphasizes weapons skills, including use of swords. Many of the hand methods are based on the symbolic fighting movements of various animals.

== Etymology ==
In Korean, “kuk” translates as nation or country, “sool” translates as method or technique, and “won” translates as courtyard or institute (with an archaic meaning of schoolhouse). The listed meaning is extracted from the full expression of "hanguk musool" (한국무술; 韓國武術) for which "kuksool" is a standard method of contraction in the Korean language {韓國=ROK, 武術=martial arts}.

== History ==
=== Origins ===
Suh In-Hyuk was a recognized Hapkido master in Korea during the 20th century. However, during this time period after the Japanese Occupation, many sought to change the name of Hapkido, for it was identical to the name Aikido when written in Chinese characters. In Korea, Kuk Sool Won is considered as a style of Hapkido. Suh's version of Hapkido is known for continuous development of unique techniques.

=== History (according to Kuk Sool Won) ===
Suh In-Hyuk claims that he was trained by his grandfather, a supposed master-instructor to the Korean Royal Court named Suh Myung-Deuk, and followed a family tradition of martial arts that stretched back sixteen generations. After the death of his grandfather during the Korean War, he travelled throughout the Far East visiting various Buddhist monasteries and other esteemed martial arts masters as research for developing his own system. His younger brother, Seo In-Sun, took lessons from the founder of Hapkido, Choi Yong-sool, and would later show what he was taught to his two older brothers.

A lawsuit revealed allegations that Suh In-Hyuk’s narrative was fabricated, and that his grandfather was not a member of the Korean Royal Court. Suh In-Hyuk's first wife claims that he started martial arts because he had been severely beaten and wanted revenge on his attackers. In her opinion, Suh In-Hyuk lied about his history due to the belief that it would be harder to disprove it in the United States.

A bare-bones curriculum for the system was developed in 1958 and later, the Kuk Sool Won was founded in 1961 (the initial syllabus continuing to be fleshed out and modified as the years went on). Suh fled South Korea in 1974 and decided to introduce his system to the United States in 1975.

=== Spread ===
In 1991, Kuk Sool Won was selected as an extracurricular activity for the U.S. Military Academy at West Point, and, in 1992, Suh In-Hyuk was presented with the Commander's Sword at West Point.

In the Netherlands, Kuk Sool Won is practiced in six schools. The highest rank instructor in the Netherlands is Robbin Baly (6th dan), who teaches a group of approximately 200 students in Amsterdam and elsewhere.

Kuk Sool Won was imported to Iran in 1980 by engineer Dariush Ghaffari, who lived in the United States prior. He first started teaching the art at the "Tehran Fire Club".

There have been multiple allegations raised in a lawsuit against the organization recently. The federal court lawsuit includes claims of financial mismanagement, contract disputes, wrongful termination, and defamatory actions against former high-ranking members.

== Technique ==
Kuk Sool Won relies on a historical perspective of traditional Korean martial arts when outlining its contents, which breaks things down into three main branches:

1. Tribal martial arts (사도무술; 師徒武術; Sah Doh Mu Sool)
2. Buddhist Temple martial arts (불교무술; 佛敎武術; Bul Kyo Mu Sool)
3. Royal Court martial arts (궁중무술; 宮中武術; Koong Joong Mu Sool).

Techniques from these three segments were carefully selected and organized into a cohesive curriculum in order to form the basis of Kuk Sool Won. This martial arts knowledge was said to be passed down to Suh In-Hyuk by his grandfather, Suh Myung-deuk, who began teaching him at the age of five. A more simplistic way to describe the contents of Kuk Sool Won would be to acknowledge that it is a successful combination or conglomeration of Hapkido (a derivative of Daitō-ryū Aiki-jūjutsu), Kung Fu (particularly Mantis style, although whether from the Southern or Northern variety isn't clear), and certain indigenous Korean martial arts (such as Taekkyeon). Note that combining disparate martial skills often yields inconsistencies that are difficult to overcome, yet this is not the case for the resulting foundation of elements found in the art of Kuk Sool.

Kuk Sool Won is a systematic study of all of the conventional fighting arts, which together comprise the martial arts history of Korea. As a martial arts system, Kuk Sool Won is extremely well-organized and seeks to integrate and explore the entire spectrum of established Asian fighting arts, along with body conditioning, mental development, and traditional weapons training. The following list represents a short summary regarding the most common elements found in the system:

- hand strikes and blocking / parrying
- kicks and leg sweeps
- body throws and grappling
- joint-locking techniques
- safe falling (i.e. break-falls) and acrobatics
- various types of body conditioning
- animal style techniques
- traditional Korean weaponry
- meditation and specialty breathing techniques

The incorporated skills are often practiced in class and tournament by utilizing 6 kata-like “Hyung” and 221 “techniques” learned at the coloured belt, and black belt candidate level. The fighting style is brutal and quick to damage joints beyond repair; practitioners are taught early to only use the arts in controlled settings or in true self defense. There are also types of forms consisting of weapons. Examples include short sword, knife, sword, short staff, cane, fan, bow and arrow, jointed staff, rope and spear.

In Kuk Sool Won there are four basic sword forms that are taught (each with its own underlying set of principles, or gum bup 검법):

- jung gum hyung - straight [grip] sword form - 정검형
- yuk gum hyung - inverted [grip] sword form - 역검형
- ssang jang gum hyung - twin long sword form - 쌍장검형
- ssang dan gum hyung - twin short sword form - 쌍단검형

Both long and short twin sword forms include techniques where the weapons are held in either the straight or inverted fashion, or in some cases one hand in straight fashion while the other is inverted.

== Attire ==
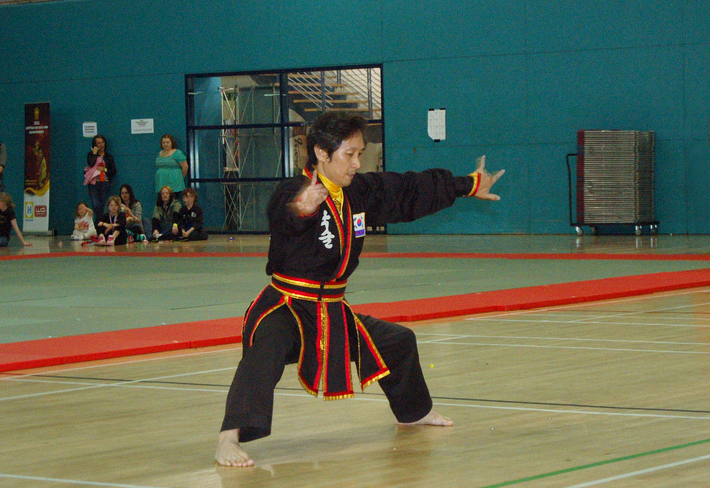
Sung Jin Suh, wearing a 8th Dahn Black Belt dobok.

Kuk Sool Won practitioners wear typical martial art uniforms or dobok (도복) for training. All the uniforms in Kuk Sool Won are black, which, according to Korean culture, is used to represent wisdom. For special occasions, there is a dress uniform for Black Belt ranks only, which was patterned after the dress worn by ancient Korean generals (which is not too dissimilar from Japanese armour). In the following section, the table mentions a Wang Sa dobok, which is only worn by the grandmaster of Kuk Sool Won (wang sa translates as "king's teacher" which explains why the royal colours of gold and purple are utilised). Also, in the table where colours are mentioned for the General's Uniform, the first colour refers to the trim on the collar, lapel, cuffs, and tails, of the uniform, while the second colour refers to that of the ascot. (Also mentioned is the type of emblem displayed on the ascot: ascots for all Master ranks sport the KSW logo.)

== Ranking system ==
For coloured belts: A new belt with a stripe running down its center —or— a transverse taped stripe added at the end of the belt, can be awarded for slight accomplishment before receiving the next belt (there are a total of 12 grades below DAN rank, i.e. Black Belt, thus placing 2 grades within each belt colour).

The tail end of each listed title is ‟nim” but isn't really part of the title per se, as it serves mainly as an honorific to be appended to the title only when addressing the individual in person (this is why it is set off with a forward slash where each term is written in Hangul). Note that coloured belt ranks do not carry formal titles, except for Black Belt Candidates.

Title	Meaning / Rank / Colour Scheme
Kuk Sa Nym 국사 \ 님	Grandmaster - wangsa dobok
Su Suhk Kwang Jang Nim 수석관장 \ 님	Senior Executive Master (9th degree Black Belt) - gold / gold
Suhn Im Kwang Jahng Nim 선임관장 \ 님	Executive Master (8th degree Black Belt) - red & gold / gold
Ji Do Kwang Jahng Nim 지도관장 \ 님	Senior Master (7th degree Black Belt) - red & gold / red
Joo Im Kwang Jahng Nim 주임관장 \ 님	Head Master (6th degree Black Belt) - red / red
Pyung Kwan Jahng Nim 평관장 \ 님	Master (literal: school owner)(5th degree Black Belt) - red / white
Sa Bum Nim 사범 \ 님	Instructor (4th degree Black Belt) - red & silver / white (KSW–logo)
Pu Sa Bum Nim 부사범 \ 님	Deputy Instructor (3rd degree Black Belt) - silver / white (KSW–logo)
Kyo Sa Nim 교사 \ 님	Assistant Instructor (2nd degree Black Belt) - silver / white (ROK flag)
Jo Kyo Nim 조교 \ 님	Instructor-in-Training (1st degree Black Belt) - silver / white (ROK flag)
Dahn Boh Nim 단보 \ 님	Black-Brown Belt -or- { Black Belt Candidate }
Ja Ddi 자띠	Brown Belt
Hohng Ddi 홍띠	Red Belt
Chuhng Ddi 청띠	Blue Belt
Noh Rahng Ddi 노랑띠	Yellow Belt
Huin Ddi 흰띠	White Belt

== See also ==
- Taekkyeon
- Subak
- Hankumdo
