= Hapkidowon =

American Hapkido organization

Hapkidowon World Hapkido Headquarters
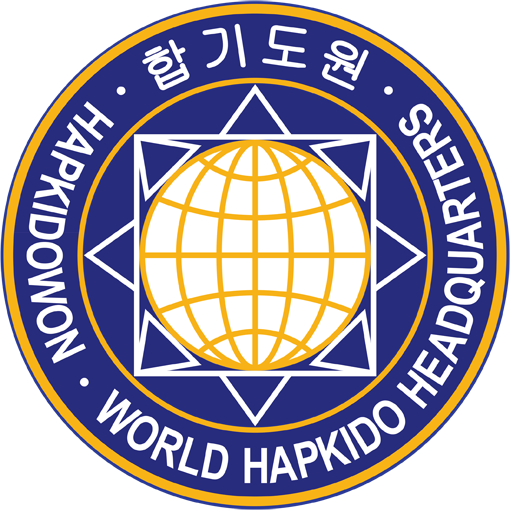
- Membership: Private
- Founded: 1981
- Headquarters: California, United States
- President: Hong-Sik Myung

Official website
- www.hapkidowon.com

- Hapkidowon
- Hangul: 합기도원
- Hanja: 합기도院
- RR: Hapgidowon
- MR: Hapkidowŏn

Hapkidowon (Korean: 합기도원), also known as the World Hapkido Headquarters (세계합기도원), and Foundation of the World Hapkido, was founded by Hong Sik Myung in 1981 in Michigan, USA. Hapkidowon serves as a global hub for Hapkido instructor education, issuing official instructor certifications and Dan (black belt) ranks, hosting international seminars, and providing leadership and guidance to affiliated schools and organizations worldwide. The foundation trains martial arts leaders to develop a sound mind, body, and spirit in accordance with the principles of Hapkido. Additionally, it focuses on fostering unity among Hapkido artists while recognizing individuals who contribute to the improvement of the art, their local communities, and the organization itself.

As a dedicated educational institution, Hapkidowon preserves the dynamic art of Hapkido in its authentic form. Offensive and defensive skills are taught for practical, real-world applications across various combat scenarios, including: empty hand vs. empty hand, empty hand vs. weapon, and weapon vs. weapon. Empty hand techniques include joint locking, kicking, punching, throwing, and immobilization, while weapon techniques utilize the knife, cane, rope, so bong, dan bong, joong bong, jahng bong, sword, and other traditional implements.

== History ==
Hong Sik Myung began his Hapkido training at the WonHyo Dojang in 1960. He later participated in the "1st Korean National Hapkido Unified Demonstration" in Seoul, Korea, in 1968. He became an instructor at the Korea Hapkido YonMuKwan SangDo Dojang in 1970, and by 1973, he was appointed chief master instructor of the Korea Hapkido YonMooKwan Headquarters, subsequently taking leadership of the Korea Hapkido YonMooKwan Association. He immigrated to the United States in 1981 and opened Myung's Hapkido in Detroit, Michigan. That same year, he established the World Hapkido Headquarters - Hapkidowon, which was later relocated to Corona, California, in 2004.

Hong Sik Myung was profoundly influenced by the grandmasters Seo Bok-seob, Ji Han-jae and his brother, Myung Kwang-sik. In December 2012, he was awarded a 10th-degree black belt (SIB DAN) in Seoul by Seo Bok-seob, the President of the Daehan Yukwonsool Hapkido Association. He is the only practitioner to receive a 10th DAN directly from Seo Bok-seob. Today, Grandmaster Myung continues to propagate Hapkido worldwide through international seminars and remains one of the world's most recognized instructors and practitioners of the art.

== Philosophy ==
=== Five Commandments ===
Hapkidowon philosophy and teachings are composed of moral ethics in addition to physical techniques with the belief that those who are trained in the art must also learn to use their skills responsibly.

합기도원 5개(戒)	Rules in Korean	Hanja	Translation
1	도지지개	道之持戒	Observe the tenets of Hapkido
2	사형공경	師兄恭敬	Respect my instructors and seniors
3	도불남용	道不濫用	Never misuse Hapkido
4	도지의용	道之義用	Use Hapkido for just means
5	원관공헌	院館貢獻	Contribute to the welfare of Hapkidowon and our school

=== Meaning of Hapkidowon ===
Hap: 합:合 = Hap means "harmony", "coordinated" or "joining"; put [bring] together, combine, unite, join together
Ki : 기: 氣 = Ki describes internal energy, spirit, strength, or power; vigor, energy, vitality, strength, force, spirits, stamina, virility
Do : 도:道 = Do means "way" or "art", yielding a literal translation of "joining-energy-way"
Won:원:院 = Won means: house for learning, foundation, academy. Also Association (as in Kuk Sool Won)
Hapkido won (합기도원)means house for learning Hapkido. It is the International Hapkido Organization, also known as World Hapkido Headquarters (세계합기도본부), and home to authentic Hapkido

=== Meaning of the Hapkidowon symbol ===
The symbol represents the principles of Hapkido's concept and technique in the form of 원 (won, circle), 방(bahng, square), and 각(gahk, triangle). Won represents the heaven (or universe), bahng within the won represents the earth, and the gahk represents a man. As the logo shows, the earth is contained within the universe and the earth is surrounded by men. The symbol is the unification of the universe, the earth and the man: this is the Hapkido's accord and principle.
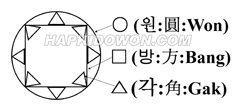
It represents the boundless or limitless (無極, Mu Geuk) Grand Way (大道, Dae Doh) to Unify (十, Siep – meaning numeral ten – also represents combined whole) the Heaven (上, Sang), Earth (下, Hah), and All Points (八方, Pahl-Bahng) of a man's surrounding (氣, Ki). Therefore, 上下八方無極大道 means in short “The way to unify the boundless heaven and earth with a man’s surrounding Ki”.
The globe represents the vision of the Hapkidowon to create the international cultural heritage beneficial to all mankind through Hapkido in all corners of the world. And the logo bears the word 합기도원 (Hapkidowon) in Korean where the art was born, and supplemented with the Hapkidowon, World Hapkido Headquarters.

== See also ==
- Korean martial arts
- Choi Yong Sul
- Seo Bok-Seob
