= GongKwon Yusul =

Modern Korean martial art system

Gongkwon Yusul
- Focus: Hybrid, Striking, Ground fighting, and Grappling
- Hardness: Full Contact
- Country of origin: South Korea
- Creator: Kang Jun
- Famous practitioners: Yoon Jun Lee, Ye Ji Lee, Nick Mann
- Parenthood: Hapkido, Hakkō-ryū Jūjutsu, Judo, Kumdo, Taekwondo, Taekkyon, Teukgong Moosool, Kickboxing, and Kyeok Too Ki
- Olympic sport: no
- Official website: www.gongkwon.com

Korean name
- Hangul: 공권유술
- Hanja: 空拳柔術
- Revised Romanization: Gongkwonyusul
- McCune–Reischauer: Kongkwonyusul

Gongkwon Yusul is a modern Korean martial art system founded by Kang Jun in 1996. Its main influences include Hapkido, Hakkō-ryū Jūjutsu, Judo, Kumdo, Taekkyon, Taekwondo, Teukgong Moosool (Korean military martial art), Kickboxing, and Kyeok Too Ki. (Note: Also known as KTK, Kyuk Too Ki, or Gyeok Tu Gi) Currently, this martial art exists in the form of an amateur-level combat sport.

== Characteristics ==
Gongkwon Yusul emphasizes the application of striking, throwing, grappling, and ground fighting techniques in practical, free-flowing combat sport format. Like many other modern hybrid martial arts and combat sports, Gongkwon Yusul combines the aspects and techniques often seen in combat sport styles such as Kickboxing and Judo, while still retaining many traditional martial art attributes, such as uniforms, terminology, and ranking structure.

== History ==
Gongkwon Yusul was founded during the era prior to the popularization of modern Mixed Martial Arts and Brazilian jiu-jitsu in Korea, and its hybrid nature and emphasis on real fighting brought backlash from the mainstream Korean martial arts community where they at the time believed that, while grappling and striking are both accepted forms of combat, they must be trained separately. Gongkwon Yusul was accepted by the mainstream in the country only after when modern Mixed Martial Arts (in the early 2000s), along with Brazilian jiu-jitsu (in 1999), was introduced and became well known in Korea, effectively changing the views of the country's mainstream and martial artists.

== International Expansion ==
Gongkwon Yusul has spread to 16 countries worldwide (including the United States, Spain, Australia, Mexico, Argentina, Canada, Sweden, France, Germany, and Brazil) and is practiced in these regions.

== Ranks ==
GongKwon Yusul belt ranks are:

1. White
2. Yellow (5th gup)
3. Green (4th gup)
4. Blue (3rd gup)
5. Red (2nd gup)
6. Brown (1st gup)
7. Black

== Gongkwon Yusul practitioners in other combat sports ==
Yoon Jun Lee, a former 2007 Gongkwon Yusul champion, won the Bantamweight title in the South Korean MMA promotion, Road FC, in 2014. Lee not only fought in MMA matches but also in a Submission wrestling match featured by the same promotion.

Ye Ji Lee, who was trained by Jeon Chan-jun, Yoon Jun Lee's former Gongkwon Yusul instructor, also competed in MMA promotions, including Road FC. Lee also competed in the Japanese shootfighting organization, Shooto.

== Challenge matches ==
In the past, the founder, Kang Jun, was involved in challenge matches when he started to become known in Korea after publishing his books. In his interview, he stated that he spent time as a judo competitor and trained other martial arts as well. Kang also stated that most of those challengers were bluffers, with some matches with the challenger defeated in 2-3 seconds. He stated the challengers he defeated could have sued him, but it never happened.

== Yeomtasul ==
Yeomtasul is a self-defense program created by Kang in 1996, when he created Gongkwon Yusul. Kang intended Yeomtasul not as an independent school of martial arts, but as an auxiliary self-defense program. Yeomtasul's techniques are based on striking and grappling principles and techniques of Gongkwon Yusul while utilizing a Hapkido-style Dan Bong (baton). While other empty-handed martial arts also feature self-defense programs involving weapons, they often avoid sparring (unlike weapon-based martial arts like Kumdo). In contrast, Yeomtasul incorporates sparring into its training regimen.

== See also ==
- Jujutsu
- Hapkido
- Judo
- Taekwondo
- Kyeok Too Ki
- Combat sport
