= Taekyeon =

Taekyeon could refer to the following.

- Taekkyeon, a Korean form of traditional martial arts.
- Taecyeon, the main rapper of the band 2PM.
