= International H.K.D. Federation =

- International H.K.D. Federation logo.

Korean name
- Hangul: 국제연맹합기회
- Hanja: 國際聯盟合氣會
- Revised Romanization: Gukje Yeonmaeng Hapgihoe
- McCune–Reischauer: Kukche Yŏnmaeng Hapkihoe

The International H.K.D. Federation (I.H.F.) was founded in 1974 by hapkido grandmaster Myung Jae Nam. Its original name was the International Hapkido Federation — it was changed when hankido and hankumdo were added to the I.H.F.'s curriculum.

== Goal ==
The goal of the I.H.F is to promote the practice of Korean martial arts like hapkido, hankido and hankumdo.

== History ==
Myung Jae Nam had started teaching in Incheon from his school called Jeong Do Kwan (정도관) in 1962. In 1973 he founded his own federation, called Dae Han Kuk Hapki Hwe (대한국합기회). In October 1974, while still maintaining his own organization, he assisted in the forming the Dae Han Min Kuk Hapkido Hyop Hwe (대한민국합기도협회, Republic of Korea Hapkido Association). He was appointed the executive director and remained with that organization until 1980.

In August 1974, he again changed the name of his own organization to Kuk Je Yon Maeng Hapki Hwe (국제연맹합기회), which is known in English as the International H.K.D. Federation. In the same year he co-founded the Korean Hapkido Association.

In 1981 the IHF was recognized by the Korean government.

In August 1993 the I.H.F. opened the International hapkido hankido world headquarters (국제연맹 합기도 한기도 세계본부) near the city of Yongin.

Myung Jae Nam's son, Myung Sung Kwang, assumed leadership of the International H.K.D. Federation in 1999 upon the passing of his father. In February 2010 Myung Sung Kwang finished his study at the Hangyang University with a thesis titled 'A Study on Hankido'.

== International Games ==
The goal of the I.H.F. is to organize the International H.K.D Games every three years. Since 1990 the I.H.F. has organized seven such games. The most recent took place in Battle Creek, MI in the summer of 2010. In 2013 the games were scheduled to take place in Korea again. The games of 2016 will probably take place in Brazil.

1. 1990
2. 1993
3. 1996
4. 1999
5. 2002
6. 2005
7. 2008
8. 2010
9. 2013
10. 2016
11. 2019
12. 2022
13. 2025

== Jae Nam Mu Sul Won ==
After Myung Jae Nam died in 1999, his son Myung Sung-kwang took over. In 2000 he received permission from the Korean Ministry of Culture and Tourism to start the Jaenam Musul Won Foundation, of which he is president. This foundation is in charge of Myung Jae Nam's heritage and oversees the development of Hapkido, Hankido, Hankumdo, and Hwal Bub for the International H.K.D. Federation.

== Korean Police ==
Koreans who want to enter the police academy need a black belt certificate from one of the selected Korean hapkido organizations. In the past the IHF was one of only three organizations whose certificates were accepted; now the certificates of four more organizations are accepted.
