= Hankido =

Korean martial art style

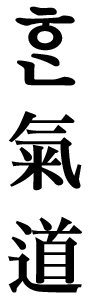

Korean name
- Hangul: 한기도
- Hanja: 韓氣道
- RR: Hangido
- MR: Han'gido

Hankido (Korean: 한기도) is a new martial art style developed by Myung Jae-nam using circular flowing movements owing to Myung Jae-nam's background in traditional Korean dance.

== Etymology ==
The name hankido is a mix of the name Hanguk (the Korean name for South Korea) and hapkido. The resulting word hankido is often written with the han in Old Korean, where the letter "a" (ㅏ) is written as arae-a, which looks like a dot. Hankido aims to be a Korean martial art for and from the Korean people, accessible to everyone. The precise origin of hapkido, from which hankido is derived, is one of many Japan–Korea disputes, as there is a strong connection to the Japanese martial art aikido. "Aikido" is always written in kanji, which is similar to hanja.

The word hankido actually consists of three different hanja:

- Han (한 / 韓): Korea, Korean culture and mentality (see Names of Korea).
- Ki (기 / 氣): Ki
- Do (도 / 道): The way

So it could be said that hankido means: The way for Korean people to develop their internal energy/strength.

== History ==
Hankido is a relatively new hapkido style, developed by Myung Jae Nam. Myung Jae Nam studied traditional hapkido which formed the basis of this new art. Myung Jae Nam started the development of what we now know as hankido in the 1980s. This new hapkido style can be recognized by its elegant, circular movements which the hankido practitioner uses to get in control of his or her opponent. Of course this is partly because hankido has its roots partly in hapkido, but also because Myung Jae Nam, who was a talented dancer, mixed the techniques with traditional Korean dance. This part of hankido is called: Moo Yae Do Bub (무예도법).

Hankido was first officially introduced during the 1st International H.K.D Games in Seoul, South Korea. The development of hankido did not stop there, and in the years after its introduction hankido lost some of its rough edges. In 1993 the IHF trademarked the name hankido in both hangul and hanja writing in South Korea for the first time.

Myung Jae Nam toured Europe and the United States to promote his new art until his death in 1999. During the 3rd edition of these games, Myung Jae Nam introduced another art, called hankumdo.

== Hankido and hapkido ==
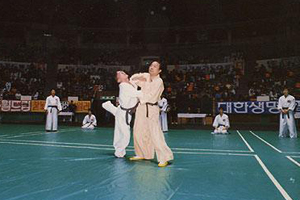
float

The difference between hapkido and hankido is that hankido is much more an internal art where hapkido is a semi-internal art. Hankido emphasizes the use of three principles, which are Won (圓), Yu (流), and Hwa (和), and using the power of softness.

To give the hankido practitioner more insight into these principles, there are three exercises they can practice, the Sam Dae Wolly (삼대원리). The name of the exercise representing the circle-principle is called Jeon Hwan Bub (전환법). The name for the exercise of the flow-principle is called Young Nyu Bub (역류법) and the last exercise, representing the heart-principle, is called Shim Hwa Bub (심화법). This last one is also referred to as the rowing exercise.

== Techniques ==
Another unique aspect of hankido is that it consists of twelve basic self-defense techniques (ho shin ki, 호신기) which are connected to 24 breathing techniques: twelve for the defender called 'Techniques of the Sky' (Chun Ki Bub, 천기법, 天氣法) and twelve techniques for the attacker called 'Techniques of the Earth' (Ji Ki Bub, 지기법, 地氣法). Heaven and Earth are each other's opposites and thus resemble the Korean Um (Yin in Chinese) and Yang.

There is more to hankido than just these twelve circle techniques, but these form the stable basis for every hankido practitioner.

== Curriculum ==
There are 8 disciplines (directions) in which the I.H.F teaches the hankido curriculum.

1. Ho Shin Do Bup (Self defense)
2. Moo Ye Do Bup (Spinning/dancing techniques)
3. Su Jok Do Bup (Striking techniques)
4. Kyuk Ki Do Bup (Sparring techniques)
5. Ki Hap Do Bup (Ki-development techniques)
6. Byung Sool Do Bup (Weaponry)
7. Su Chim Do Bup (Use of pressure points)
8. Hwan Sang Do Bup (Visualisation and breathing exercises)

The twelve basic self-defense techniques on which the hankido curriculum is built are:

1. Kwan Jul Ki Bub - 관절기법
2. Chi Ki Bub - 치기법
3. Sib Ja Ki Bub - 십자기법 / 十자기법
4. Nae Wae Ki Bub - 내외기법 / 內外기법
5. Kyeo Rang Ki Bub - 겨랑기법
6. Mok Kama Bub - 목감아법
7. Mok Keokki Bub - 목꺾기법
8. Oh Kae Too Bub - 어깨투법
9. Joong Pal Too Bub - 중팔투법
10. Hwae Jeon Too Bub - 회전투법
11. Pal Mok Ki Bub - 팔목기법
12. Pal Bae Ki Bub - 팔배기법

== Development ==
After Myung Jae Nam's death the development of hankido has been overseen by the Jaenam Musul Won Foundation.

There are several international and Korean initiatives to spread the art of hankido. Most well known for his effort to do this was Master Ko Baek Yong from the Sang Moo Kwan International Training Center. He founded the World Hankimuye Federation.

== See also ==
- International H.K.D Federation
- Korean martial arts
