= NWA Oriental Tag Team Championship =

Professional wrestling tag team championship

Details
- Promotion: Korean Pro Wrestling Association (KPWA); World Wrestling Association (WWA)
- Date established: 1982
- Date retired: 2004
Statistics
- First champion(s): Namhyaesan and Oh Tae Kyun
- Final champion(s): Kim Do Yu and Yim Dae-Su

The NWA Oriental Tag Team Championship was a professional wrestling tag team championship recognized by the National Wrestling Alliance through its partnership with the Korean Pro Wrestling Association.

== Title history ==
Key
No.	Overall reign number
Reign	Reign number for the specific team—reign numbers for the individuals are in parentheses, if different
Days	Number of days held
N/A	Unknown information
(NLT)	Championship change took place "no later than" the date listed

No.	Champion	Championship change			Reign statistics		Notes	Ref.
No.	Champion	Date	Event	Location	Reign	Days	Notes	Ref.
1	Nam Hyaesan and Oh Taekyun	May 2, 1982	Japan-Korea Friendship International Wrestling Tournament	Seoul, South Korea	1	N/A	Defeated Prince Tonga and Nobuyoshi Sugawara.	
Championship history is unrecorded from May 1982 to June 20, 1985.
—	Vacated	N/A	—	—	—	—		
N/A	Lee Wang Pyo and Kim Kwangsik	June 20, 1985	N/A	N/A			Defeated Mr. x and Blade Masters.	
Championship history is unrecorded from June 20, 1985 to June 1, 1991.
N/A	Lee Wang Pyo (2) and Kim Doyu	June 1, 1991 (NLT)	N/A	N/A				
Championship history is unrecorded from June 1, 1993 to August 6, 1993.
N/A	Kim Doyu (2) and Yim Daesu	August 6, 1993 (NLT)	N/A	N/A				
—	Vacated	November 4, 2004	House Show	Seoul, South Korea	—	—	Championship vacated after Kim's retirement.	

== See also ==
- List of National Wrestling Alliance championships
- NWA Oriental Heavyweight Championship
