= Song Deok-gi =

Korean martial artist and preserver of the traditional martial art of Taekkyon

Song Deok-Gi
- Born: 19 January 1893; Sajik-dong, Seoul, Hanseong, Korean Empire
- Died: 23 July 1987 (aged 94); Seoul, South Korea
- Style: Taekkyon, Gungdo
- Teacher: Im Ho

Other information
- Occupation: Taekkyon preserver, Seonbi

- Song Deok-gi
- Hangul: 송덕기
- Hanja: 宋德基
- RR: Song Deokgi
- MR: Song Tŏkki

Art name
- Hangul: 현암
- Hanja: 玄庵
- RR: Hyeonam
- MR: Hyŏnam

Song Deok-gi (Korean: 송덕기; Hanja: 宋德基); (19 January 1893 – 23 July 1987) was a martial artist from Korea. One of the last practitioners of the ancient martial art of Taekkyon, he helped convey the art during the Japanese Occupation of Korea (1910–1945) and the Korean War (1950–1953).

Based on his efforts, the South Korean government acknowledged Taekkyon as the 76th Important Intangible Cultural Properties of Korea and recognized him as a Human Cultural Asset (Ingan-munhwage).

He used Hyeonam (현암; 玄庵) as a pen name.

== Early life and training ==
Song Deok-gi was born in 1893 in Sajik-dong, Seoul, in a family of Taekkyon practitioners. He was introduced by his father to renowned Taekkyon Master Im Ho (임호; 林虎) when he was 12 years old. He trained intensively under him for four years, and continued learning for over a decade until Im Ho's death.

At that time, Taekkyon was practised as a martial art and a folk game by people in the vicinity of Seoul. Song learnt in a glade located on the flanks of the Inwangsan mountain near the archery pavillon called Hwanghakjeong (황학정; 黄鹤亭).

Taekkyon practice in Seoul was traditionally divided between two groups: Widaepae (윗대패), referring to practitioners living inside the city walls, and Araedaepae (아랫대패), referring to those living outside them. Song belonged to the Widaepae group and frequently competed with practitioners from the Araedaepae. Each group had its own characteristics and techniques.

Alongside Taekkyon, Song also practised Korean archery (Gungdo) all his life and became the first official referee of the sport. He worked as a physical instructor for the Korean Army before its dissolution during the Japanese colonial period.

== Taekkyon during the Japanese Occupation ==
During the Japanese occupation, many korean cultural practices declined under policies of cultural assimilation. Indigenous martial traditions such as Taekkyon were discouraged and nearly disappeared. Nevertheless, Song continued to practice and train privately despite police surveillance, preserving the art . Throughout this period, he worked in various jobs, including as a bouncer at the Jongno markets and at a theater operated by his relatives.

== Revival ==
After the Korean War, Song Deok-gi was virtually the only practitioner able to teach Taekkyon left.

In 1958, he showed a demonstration of Korean martial arts in front of the president Syngman Rhee for his birthday with Kim Sung-hwan (1904?–1958), another pupil of Im Ho. While this was the first public event featuring Taekkyon in many years, it did not immediately spark a revival, as younger generations were drawn to modern martial arts such as Taekwondo.

It was only during the 1960s and 1970s that Taekkyon began to regain traction. During this period Song began instructing a small number of dedicated students, among them Lee Jun‑seo (1962-) and Ko Yong‑woo (1952-), who became two of the earliest known disciples of his Widae Taekkyon tradition.

Around the same time, a physical education teacher, Shin Han‑seung (1928–1987), became involved in efforts to promote Taekkyon and modernize the art. While his direct training with Song was limited and sporadic, Shin played a key role in lobbying for official recognition of the art and in developing a structured curriculum. The work of both men was crucial in preserving Taekkyon, but their differing approaches later led to the development of separate lineages.

On 1 June 1983, along with Shin, Song became a national treasure as Taekkyon was designated as the 76th Important Intangible Cultural Properties of Korea by the Cultural Heritage Administration. To this day, it remains one of only three martial arts which possesses such a classification (the other being Ssireum and Gungdo). This recognition attracted many more students and helped secure the transmission of the art. Most leaders of the modern Taekkyon Associations started their formation during this period. In reaction to what he perceived as the sportification of the art, Song established the Widae Taekkyon Preservation Society with his student Lee Jun-Seo the same year.

== Legacy ==
Song Deok-gi died in 1987 at the age of 94, just twenty days apart from Shin Han‑seung. After their deaths, differences in preservation philosophy among their respective students split the Taekkyon community. Some groups emphasized Song Deok-gi’s traditional method, while others built on Shin Han-seung’s structured approach.

Today, Song Deok‑gi is widely recognized as the central figure responsible for the survival of Taekkyon. He is sometimes referred to as ‘the last Taekkyon master of the Joseon dynasty,’ and nearly all modern lineages trace their origins to his teachings.

== Honors ==
- Skill Holder of Intangible Cultural Asset No. 76 Taekkyon.
- Living National Treasure No. 283. Relinquished after his death.

== See also ==
- Taekkyon
- Korean martial arts
- Intangible Cultural Property (South Korea)
- Intangible Cultural Heritage of Humanity (UNESCO)
