= Hankumdo =

Korean sword-art technique

- Hankumdo, which is written in Hanja

Korean name
- Hangul: 한검도
- Hanja: 韓劍道
- RR: Hangeomdo
- MR: Han'gŏmdo

Hankumdo is a Korean sword-art where the basic techniques are based on the letters of the Korean alphabet, Hangul.

== Goal ==
The goal of hankumdo is to teach people how to defend themselves and at the same time offer them exercises to stay healthy. It also is meant to give practitioners the means to come to a deeper understanding of martial arts principles. It aims to make this easy by using the Korean writing system to systematize the techniques.

== History ==
Hankumdo was developed by Myung Jae Nam, who first taught his sword techniques as a separate art in 1986 and was first publicized in 1997 during the 3rd International H.K.D Games. Hankumdo originated from the techniques used in Hankido to defend against sword attacks. Though first presented as a subset of the larger Hankido curriculum under the name hankumdobub (hankumdo techniques), Myung Jae Nam later decided that it was an art that could stand on its own merits and is often taught as a separate discipline.

Hankumdo doesn't have clear roots in other sword arts, since Myung Jae Nam never received any formal education in other sword arts. The subset of techniques is quite limited, and consists only of the basics strikes and blocks found in most sword arts. GM Myung organized his sword art, HanKumdo, around the calligraphy of the Korean Hangul alphabet. It is claimed that using the five basic striking techniques one can write the entire Korean alphabet as a series of fencing combinations. In this way, Hankumdo would seem to mirror the tenet of Chinese sword practice which suggests that all sword work can be reduced to the strokes necessary to write the single Chinese character, “eui”. This tenet surfaces routinely among a broad spectrum of Oriental fencing arts and over a wide time frame.

== Meaning ==
The word hankumdo actually consists of three different words:

- Han (한 / 韓): Korea, Korean culture and mentality (see Names of Korea).
- Kum (검 / 劍): Sword
- Do (도 / 道): The way

Hankumdo can be interpreted as: The way for the Korean people to learn how to handle the sword.

== Style ==
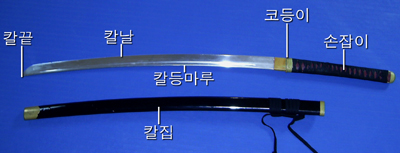
Hankumdo sword

A number of modern Korean martial arts have been influenced by Japanese styles in the 20th century, while the older arts were influenced by the Chinese, which becomes obvious in the Muyedobotongji. Myung Jae Nam however wanted to create a true Korean sword art without any foreign influences. Japanese sword arts developed into the art of man-to-man duelling during the peaceful Edo period and are characterized by a lot of attention to detail under the influence of Zen Buddhism. Traditional Korean arts never underwent this change and were purely taught to soldiers as a way to fight on the battlefield, although this does not mean that in Japanese arts battlefield techniques are not taught. Battlefield fighting is usually characterized by more flowing and ongoing movements. In duel-style fighting a lot of attention is given to the one-strike-one-kill principle, whereas in battlefield-style fighting the emphasis is on keeping the sword in motion and always being ready for the next strike. To give hankumdo a true Korean flavor, Myung Jae Nam used the Korean alphabet, known as Hangul, to teach the basic strikes of the art.

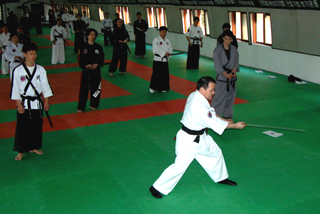

== Techniques ==
The basis for all Hankumdo techniques comes from the letters of the Korean alphabet, Hangul. This alphabet consists of 24 characters, 14 consonants (자음) and 10 vowels (모음). Since 1997 there have been several revisions of the techniques. In the earliest version the sword techniques reflected the manner in which one would write the characters on paper, thus requiring mastery of only four techniques. In the latest revision more techniques were added and the techniques become more elaborate. As a result, the manner of using the sword and of writing the letters may vary.

The strikes are being taught from several positions and with several steps, called Gi Bo Haeng (기보행). The techniques have the same name as the characters followed by the word Begi (베기) which means strike. So the name for the first technique is: Giyeokbegi (기역베기), because the name for the first character (ㄱ) in the Korean alphabet is Giyeok (기역).

Myung intended to develop a sword-art that would be truly Korean and easy to learn by everyone. For Koreans who already know the Korean writing system, the techniques are easy to remember, as the sword methods follow the standard manner in which the Korean characters are written. Foreigners are advised to learn how to write Hangul before starting with the sword techniques. Because the Korean writing system is fairly easy to learn, foreigners can become facile in the sword basics within a short period of time.

== Development ==
After Myung Jae Nam's death in 1999, the development of hankumdo is overseen by the Jaenam Musul Won Foundation

Quite a few changes and additions to the hankumdo curriculum have been made by Ko Ju Sik (고주식), the new technical director of the federation, since then.

== See also ==
- Hankido
- Kumdo
- Korean swordsmanship
- Korean martial arts
