= Open-hand strikes =

Type of martial arts technique

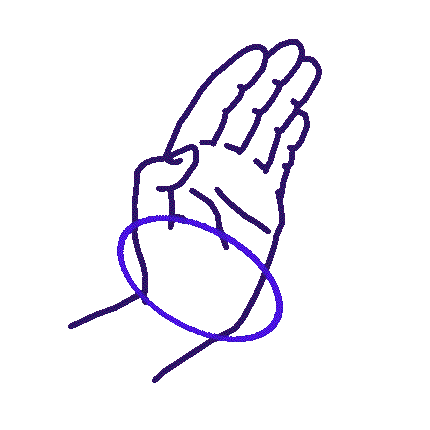
A palm-strike.

Open-hand strikes include various techniques used in the martial arts to attack or defend without curling the hand into a fist. The most famous of these techniques is probably the so-called "karate chop", which is also described as a knife-hand strike (shuto uchi) although there are many other techniques. In fact, this wide variety of techniques is what makes open-hand strikes so useful.

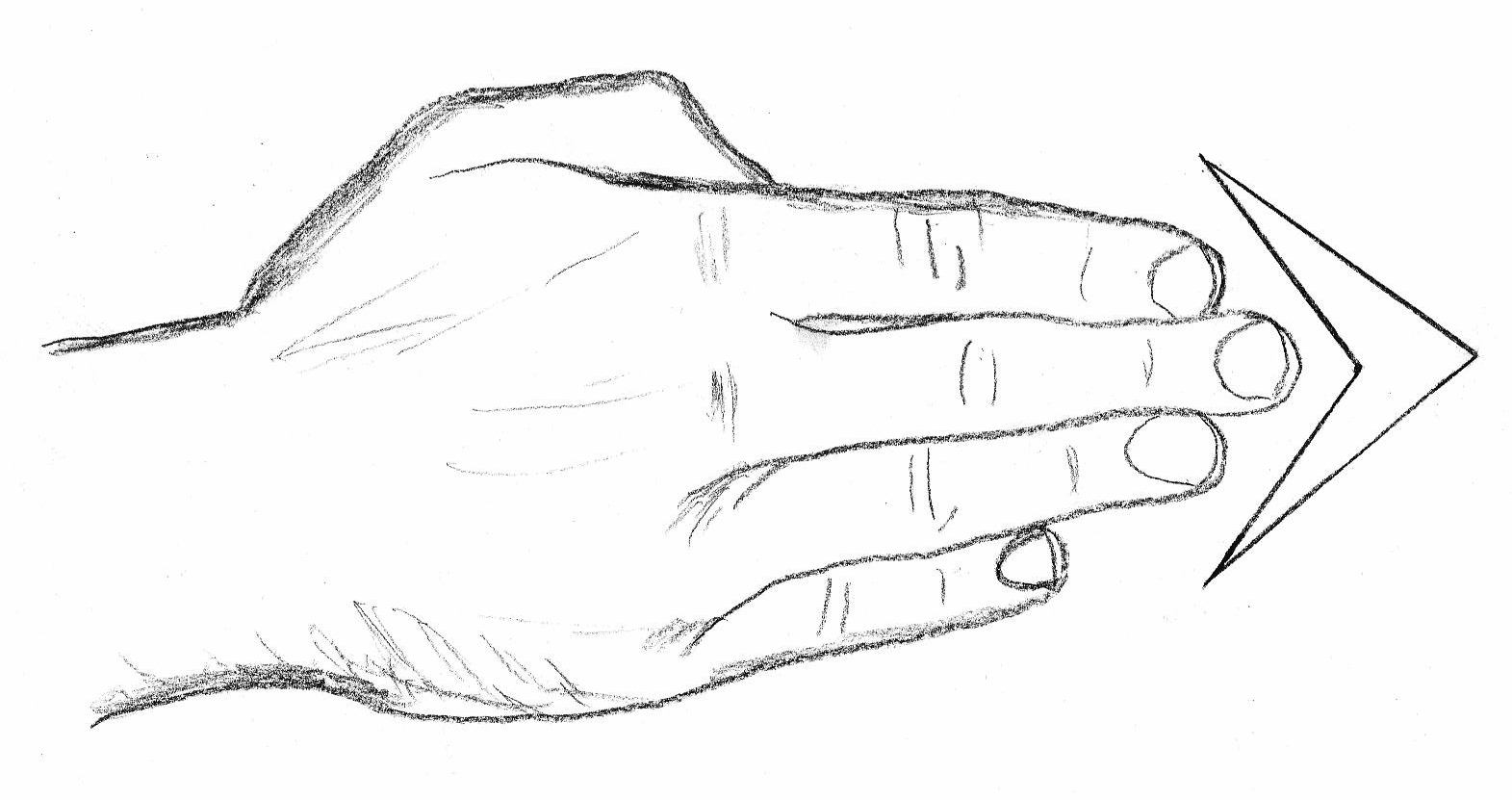
A spear-hand or nukite.

Some of these are:

1. Techniques that use the edge of the hand closest to the little finger or use the opposite edge of the hand: A knife-hand strike may be delivered in a vertical, horizontal, or intermediate arc. It is usually used to strike muscled areas such as the forearms, neck, or groin.
2. Techniques that use the other edge of the hand (ridge hand strike) are more difficult to execute since care has to be taken to position the thumb so that it will not be injured. Performing this move in a way that is powerful will generally involve striking with the palm facing down. And so doing will mean that, e.g., the person using this strike will attack the left side of his opponent's body with the right knife hand, or vice versa.
3. Spear-hand attacks are performed by keeping the extended fingers tightly compressed together and thrusting directly into some target of relatively small diameter, such as the throat. One, or two finger variations are often used in attacking pressure points. In many types of karate it is referred to as a nukite (貫手).
4. The back of the hand (back hand strike - haishu uchi), with the fingers loosely curled, can be used in an upward-arcing strike to the groin.
5. The cupped hands can be used in unison to attack the ears, potentially damaging the opponent's eardrums. This is one application of the palm strike.
6. In a palm strike, the heel of the hand can be used to strike a target without fear of damaging the knuckles. This is variously referred to in karate as a shōtei (掌打), teishō uchi (底掌打), soko tenohira (底掌) or tenohira soko uchi (掌底打ち) strike.

One of the greatest advantages of an open-hand strike is the ability to quickly grab the opponent to perform a follow-up, such as a throw or a pull into another strike. The extra control this affords as compared to a punch is worth the larger risk of damage to the hand or fingers.
