= Seo Bok-seob =

Seo Bok-Seob
- Born: 서복섭; Korea
- Nationality: South Korea
- Style: Judo, Hapkido
- Trainer: Choi Yong-Sool
- Rank: Grandmaster

Other information
- Occupation: Martial artist
- Notable students: Ji Han-Jae, Kim Moo-Hong, Moon Jong-Won
- Notable school: Co-founder of Daehan Hapki YuKwonSool Dojang with Choi Yong-Sool (1951)
- Last updated on: 2010-02-24

- Seo Bok-seob
- Hangul: 서복섭
- RR: Seo Bokseop
- MR: Sŏ Poksŏp

Seo Bok-seob (also spelled Suh Bok-sup; Korean: 서복섭) was the first student to study under hapkido founder Choi Yong-sool, with whom he founded the art's first school, the Daehan Hapki Yu Kwon Sool dojang in Daegu, Korea. Moving to Seoul he later became a professor of East Asian medicine and worked for a time at Kyung Hee University.

== Life ==
Coming from a wealthy and politically active family, he was given an excellent education and was a graduate of the prestigious Korea University. Seo also studied judo and gained his black belt in the art while still quite young. He gained positions of some authority early in life and by his early twenties was the chairman of a rice wine distillery.

Seo's father was a congressman and both the founder, Choi Yong-sool, and other hapkido practitioners, such as Won Kwang-Wha (Korean: 원광화) were employed to work as bodyguards for the politician.

Seo later went on to pursue a career in traditional oriental medicine.

== Accomplishments ==
Choi Yong-Sool's first student and the first person known to have opened up a dojang as a chief instructor under grandmaster Choi.

After watching Choi Yong-Sool successfully defend himself against a group of men when an argument erupted in the yard of the Seo Brewery Company, Seo, who was the chairman of the company, invited Choi to begin teaching martial arts to Seo and some of the workers at the distillery where Seo had prepared a makeshift dojang.

In 1951, Seo eventually opened up the first proper dojang, which was called the "Daehan Hapki YuKwonSool Dojang (Korean: 대한 합기 유권술 도장)".

Seo designed the first symbol used to denote the art consisting of two inverted arrowheads featured in both the original and modern incarnation of the Korea KiDo Association, the World Kido Association.

Choi Yong-Sool was also employed during this time as a bodyguard to Seo's father who was a congressman.

Seo claims that he and Choi agreed to shorten the name of the art from 'hapki yu kwon sool' to 'hapkido' in 1959.

== See also ==
- Korean martial arts
- Hapkido
- Choi Yong-Sool
