= Lee Wang-pyo =

South Korean pro wrestler (1954–2018)

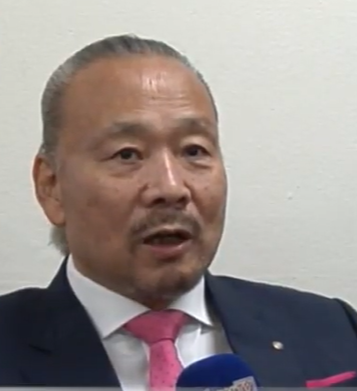

Personal information
- Born: June 11, 1954 Cheonan, South Korea
- Died: September 4, 2018 (aged 64) Seoul, South Korea

Professional wrestling career
- Ring name(s): Lee Wang-pyo; Jaguar Lee; Rick Wonshu; Lee Hi
- Billed height: 1.90 m (6 ft 3 in)
- Billed weight: 120 Kg (264 Ib)
- Trained by: Kim Il
- Debut: 1975
- Retired: 2015

- Lee Wang-pyo
- Hangul: 이왕표
- Hanja: 李王杓
- RR: I Wangpyo
- MR: I Wangp'yo

Lee Wang-pyo (June 11, 1954 – September 4, 2018), better known by stage name Super Dragon, was a South Korean professional wrestler and a founder of a hybrid fighting style and a combat sport, Kyukgido.

In professional wrestling, Lee was the promoter of the top national promotion, World Wrestling Association; during the 1980s and the 1990s he has been the babyface and the ace of that promotion, which was called at the time Korean Wrestling Association, a position he held until his retirement in 2015.

Lee was one of the most famous professional wrestler in Korean wrestling history. He was praised by Lou Thesz for his wrestling skills.

== Biography ==
He was born in 1954 in a small village in South Chungcheong province in South Korea, the second of four children.

He was notable for his tall stature since young age.

In elementary school, he was stabbed by an upperclassman. When interviewed about this fact, Lee claimed "The upperclassman couldn’t beat me by force, so he used cowardly means to win".

He said in an interview that it was in third grade that he decided to practice professional wrestling, inspired by a match involving his future master Kim Il that he saw on television.

In 1975 he began training in professional wrestling in a wrestling gym run by Kim Il: Kim Il notice Lee’s talent and started to personally train the young wrestler.

=== Career in professional wrestling ===
In 1975 he debuted in the Korean Wrestling Association (KWA), which was founded in 1961 by his master Kim Il: Lee is now considered his master's successor as the top face of the promotion and his top student. The promotion was and still is the top professional wrestling promotion in Korea.

During his career he has wrestled mainly in Korea and Japan: particularly, in 1978 Lee wrestled at the Japan-Korea Triple Competitions, a series of professional wrestling shows jointly organised by the Japanese International Wrestling Enterprise and by the KWA. He had also wrestled for All Japan Pro Wrestling.

In 1982, he wrestled in New Japan Pro-Wrestling. Antonio Inoki, gave him the nickname, Jaguar Lee.

In 1985 he became the promoter of KWA, also known as Korean Pro-Wrestling Association (KPWA).

In 1990, he returned to Japan for Frontier Martial-Arts Wrestling.

In 1993 he won in the KPWA the GWF World Heavyweight Championship and on December 13, 1999 he lost with No Ji Sim to Jason The Terrible and One Man Gang in a match for the GWF World Tag Championship.

In 1995, he wrestled for Tokyo Pro Wrestling under the name Lee Hi.

In 2000 he changes KPWA name to World Wrestling Association: he claimed ties to the original World Wrestling Association.

Therefore he proceeded to win the revamped version of the WWA World Heavyweight Championship in 2000 defeating Kurrgan.

The KWA/KWPA was affiliated with National Wrestling Alliance till 1983; with Wang Pyo as the promoter, the "new" WWA rejoined NWA using NWA Korea as an alternative name for the promotion, but still retaining the WWA name.

On the January 23, 2003 he, along with Kim II, attended the WWE Raw show in Seoul.

On March 21, 2003 in Seoul he defeated Honky Tonk Man in a match for the WWA World Heavyweight Championship, before 1,500 fans: the match was part of a feud they were having that year.

In 2008 he defeated cleanly Kurt Angle in a WWA show in Korea.

On November 12, 2008 he defeated Bob Sapp in a match for the WWA World Heavyweight Championship, which was booked as a MMA style one, with an armbar submission. The match took place at a Forever Hero event at the Olympic Park stadium in Seoul.

On October 26, 2009, at his second reign, he lost his title in a rematch to Bob Sapp at the Olympic Stadium in Seoul.

In 2015, he retired after 40 years in the business.

=== Kyukgido ===
Kyukgido
- Focus: Hybrid, Grappling, Ground fighting
- Hardness: Full-contact
- Country of origin: South Korea
- Parenthood: Boxing, Taekwondo, Judo, Amateur Wrestling, and Puroresu
- Olympic sport: No

As a professional wrestler, Lee Wang-pyo's background comes from Puroresu he learned from his teacher, Kim Il. Lee also studied different combat sports, including Boxing, Taekwondo, Judo and Amateur Wrestling. In 1980s, Lee created a modern hybrid fighting style and a combat sport, Kyukgido, combining his Professional wrestling (Puroresu) with Boxing, Taekwondo, Amateur Wrestling, and Judo. However, this martial art became known when it was first introduced to the public in 1999, when Lee started teaching courses in Sun Moon University. Korea Kyukgido Association was founded in 2001. Sources conflict with the founding year of this martial art, however, as at least one source states it is founded in 2000.

He was a member and a Grand Master Of Korean Military Arts of Korean Martial Arts Instructors Association.

=== Influence in other combat sports ===
Lee was an influential teacher to Jun Soo Lim, Lee's professional wrestling disciple and an MMA fighter who is the South Korean MMA promotion, Angel's Fighting Championship's former openweight champion and the finalist at Korea Sambo Federation's Combat Sambo tournament in 2014.

== Death ==
On September 4, 2018, Lee died after a five-year battle with gallbladder cancer. He was 64 years old.

== Filmography ==
He was well known in South Korea and he has appeared in various media.

- Strike Love - Korean television drama (2009)

== Championships and accomplishments ==
- Korean Pro-Wrestling Association/World Wrestling Association (South Korea)/NWA Korea
  - WWA World Heavyweight Championship (3 times)
  - GWF World Heavyweight Championship (1 time, final champion)
  - Far East Heavyweight Championship (1 time)
  - NWA Oriental Heavyweight Championship (1 time)
  - NWA Oriental Tag Team Championship (2 time) – with Kim Kwang Sik and Kim Do Yu

== In MMA ==
=== Championships and accomplishments ===
- Korean Martial Arts Instructors Association
  - Grand Master Of Korean Military Arts
  - 1-time Korean Mixed Martial Arts Champion
