= Subak =

Korean martial art

- Focus: Hybrid, Striking, Grappling (Throws and Joint Locks)
- Hardness: Full Contact
- Country of origin: Korea
- Descendant arts: Taekkyeon, Sumo

- Subak
- Hangul: 수박
- Hanja: 手搏
- RR: Subak
- MR: Subak

Subak (Korean: 수박; Hanja: 手搏) was a historical Korean martial art and a combat sport recorded as both a competitive activity and a method of hand-to-hand combat. Academic research indicates that it possessed distinct military applications, having been utilized by soldiers and warriors for real combat and tactical training during eras such as the Goryeo dynasty. The term literally means “hand striking” or “bare-hand fighting” and appears in Korean sources from the ancient, Goryeo and Joseon periods.

The exact techniques and characteristics of Subak are uncertain due to the fragmentary nature of surviving documentation. While some scholars consider it to be related to, or an earlier name for, Taekkyon, it is widely known as a distinct martial art.

Subak declined during the late Joseon period. In modern times, efforts to revive or reconstruct Subak have emerged, particularly in North Korea and among Korean communities in Manchuria, though the historical continuity of these practices remains a subject of debate.

Subak should not be confused with Subyeokchigi (수벽치기), a separate hand-slapping game, nor with the modern martial art Soo Bahk Do, which uses the same pronunciation but is unrelated historically.

== Etymology ==
The term Subak (수박; 手搏) is composed of the characters su (hand) and bak (to strike or fight) and can be translated as “hand striking” or “bare-hand combat.” In historical Korean sources, the term was sometimes used in a general sense to refer to unarmed fighting.

The term Subak (手搏) literally means “hand striking” or “hand fighting.” The same Chinese characters are read in Mandarin as Shoubo (手搏), a general term historically used in China to describe hand-to-hand combat. While the terminology is identical, the word in both contexts functioned primarily as a descriptive expression for unarmed fighting rather than the name of a clearly defined or continuous martial system.

Because the literal meaning emphasizes hand techniques, some modern interpretations have associated Subak primarily with open-hand strikes. However, historical records suggest that the term referred more broadly to hand-to-hand combat and was not necessarily limited to a single type of technique

== Subak Techniques ==
Historical sources describe Subak as a bare-handed fighting practice involving striking and grappling techniques. Later interpretations differ on whether it primarily emphasized open-hand strikes, punches, or a combination of methods. Because surviving documentation is limited and often ambiguous, the exact characteristics of historical Subak remain uncertain.

== History ==
Subak is documented in Korean sources from the Three Kingdoms period onward. Murals from Goguryeo tombs, including the Anak Tomb No. 3 and Muyongchong, depict figures engaged in unarmed combat that are sometimes interpreted as representations of Subak. Similar interpretations have been made regarding certain Baekje and Silla artifacts, though these identifications remain debated.

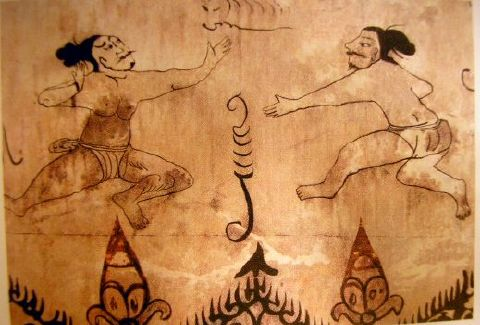
Depiction of two fighters in Subak competition.

During the Goryeo dynasty (918–1392), Subak appears in historical records under the term Subakhui (수박희), referring to organized matches or competitions. The Goryeosa records that military figures such as Yi Ui-min rose to prominence partly through their skill in Subak. Royal court events occasionally included Subak competitions.

In the Joseon dynasty (1392–1897), Subak continued to be practiced. Early Joseon legal codes such as the Gyeongguk Daejeon mention Subak in connection with military examinations. Royal annals record that kings observed Subak competitions as public entertainment.

By the late Joseon period, references to Subak decline. The 1790 martial arts manual Muyedobotongji briefly mentions it, and the 1798 encyclopedia Jaemulbo states that “Subak and Gakryeok are like today’s Taekkyeon,” a passage often cited in debates about the relationship between Subak and Taekkyeon.

== Songdo Subak ==
Songdo Subak is a modern revival movement that claims to preserve a form of Subak said to have been transmitted in the Kaesong (historically known as Songdo) region. The lineage is associated with Song Chang-ryeol (1932–2017), who stated that he learned a martial art during the Japanese colonial period from a man named Cheon Il-ryong. According to later accounts, this art was described as an old method sometimes referred to as “Subak-ta” (Subak striking).

After relocating to South Korea following the division of Korea, Song continued practicing and later taught the art to his son, Song Jun-ho, who systematized and promoted it publicly under the name “Songdo Subak.” The organization presents the art as a reconstruction of a historical Korean striking method and has sought official recognition as a traditional martial art.

The curriculum promoted by the group includes solo training methods, partnered drills, and a performance component referred to as “Subak dance.” This element consists of choreographed movements presented as preserving traditional forms of expression associated with the art. The historical continuity of these practices, however, remains a subject of debate due to limited independent documentation.

Songdo Subak has also been involved in public disputes concerning the historical interpretation of Subak and its relationship to Taekkyeon, particularly regarding questions of lineage and cultural heritage designation.

The lineage inherited by Song Chang-ryeol was announced for deliberation on designation as an Intangible Cultural Heritage by the Committee on the Five Northern Provinces under the Ministry of the Interior and Safety of Korea in 2026.

In 2025, the documentation and archival materials regarding the transmission of Subak by Song Chang-ryeol were officially submitted to the National Heritage Administration of Korea for nomination to the UNESCO Memory of the World Committee for Asia and the Pacific, where they underwent formal evaluation.

== Relationship to Taekkyeon ==
The connection between Subak and Taekkyon is disputed.

Some researchers argue that Subak was an earlier name for indigenous Korean striking arts that later evolved into Taekkyeon. This interpretation relies on textual similarities and late Joseon references equating Subak with contemporary Taekkyeon.

Others maintain that Subak and Taekkyeon were distinct activities, noting differences in emphasis (hand techniques versus kicking techniques) and inconsistencies in historical terminology.

Because there is no continuous, documented technical lineage linking historical Subak to modern Taekkyeon, the precise relationship remains uncertain.

In the 21st century, debate over the relationship between Subak and Taekkyeon has extended beyond academic discussion. Organizations promoting Songdo Subak have questioned the historical claims of Taekkyeon groups, particularly in relation to cultural heritage recognition. Taekkyeon was designated as an Important Intangible Cultural Property of South Korea in 1983 and was inscribed on UNESCO’s Representative List of the Intangible Cultural Heritage of Humanity in 2011.

The historical connection between Subak and Taekkyeon remains unresolved, and interpretations vary depending on the sources and methodologies used.

== Relationship to Japanese martial arts ==
While mainstream historiography generally views early Sumo as developing from native Japanese ritual performances, some modern cross-cultural studies suggest historical ties to peninsular martial arts. A 2012 comparative study by Choi and Heo argued that early Japanese Sumo shares cultural elements with unarmed martial traditions transmitted through the Korean peninsula, which originally stemmed from ancestral and funeral rites. In East Asian historiography, generic terms like Subak or Sangbak were frequently utilized across Korea, China, and Japan to describe these broad unarmed fighting traditions. Additionally, researchers Kim and Nam note that historical records of Joseon-era cultural exchange document bare-handed martial arts practitioners sharing similar technical characteristics with practitioners of Japanese jujutsu and competing directly with them.

Despite the similarities in form, interestingly in Japan, ancient Sumo is considered as a style of Wrestling, while in Korea, Subak isn't. This is most likely because in Korea, Gakjeo (known today as Ssireum) played the primarily role as folk wrestling.
