= Korean martial arts =

- Hangul: 무술; 무예; 무도
- Hanja: 武術; 武藝; 武道
- RR: musul; muye; mudo
- MR: musul; muye; mudo

Korean martial arts (Korean: 무술 musul or 무예 muye or 무도 mudo) are fighting practices and methods that developed on the Korean Peninsula through its history, marked by frequent warfare and foreign invasions. They were later adapted for military training, self-defense, sport, cultural preservation, and personal development. They include both unarmed and armed disciplines and reflect a mix of indigenous traditions and outside influences, particularly from China and Japan.

Evidence of martial practices in Korea can be traced back to early history, including depictions of wrestling in Goguryeo tomb murals from the 4th to 6th centuries. During the Goryeo and Joseon dynasties, martial skills were organized for military use, most notably in manuals such as the Muyedobotongji (1795).

Many traditional martial arts and modern combat sports were formed or reorganized in the 20th century, particularly following the Japanese occupation of Korea (1910–1945). This period disrupted many indigenous martial traditions while also shaping modern training methods, terminology, and structures. As a result, the historical continuity of some of the traditional martial arts remains debated. In the 21st century, modern martial arts and combat sports continued to emerge.

Notable Korean martial arts include taekwondo, hapkido, ssireum, and taekkyon, while armed traditions include Korean archery (gungdo), swordsmanship (kumdo). In November 2011, taekkyon was added to UNESCO’s Intangible Cultural Heritage of Humanity list.

== Terminology ==
In Korean sources, several terms are used to describe martial practices:

Musul (Hangul: 무술; Hanja: 武術), litterally "martial techniques", refers to the art, skill, and system of defensive combat, with preventing violence as the main focus.

Muye (Hangul: 무예; Hanja 武藝), litterally "martial artistry", refers to the talent and craft obtained after mastering musul.

Mudo (Hangul: 무도; Hanja: 武道), meaning "martial way", combines the concept of spirituality and societal improvement for practitioners of the craft.

== Cultural and institutional context ==
Historically, Korean martial practices were shaped mainly by military needs and state institutions rather than by a hereditary warrior class. During the Joseon dynasty, long periods of relative stability and the dominance of Neo-Confucianism reduced the social status of martial pursuits. These practices became largely confined to the military and state service. As a result, martial training tended to be changed, revised, or abandoned according to changing political and military conditions.

From the late 19th century through the mid-20th century, the collapse of Joseon and social upheaval further disrupted martial transmission. The Japanese occupation, the Korean War, and the division of Korea changed how martial practices were taught, preserved, and reorganized.

These conditions made it difficult for individual schools or lineages to survive over time. Therefore, much of premodern Korean martial traditions survive only in fragments.

== History ==
=== Early history ===
Early Korean peoples and later states developed in a context of frequent warfare and territorial conflict.

Wrestling, known as Gakjeo or Ssireum (씨름), is generally considered the oldest form of wrestling and grappling in Korea. It was practiced as physical training and as popular recreation.

Unarmed practices formed part of broader martial activity, and weapons were often seen as extensions of empty-hand techniques. These activities were not limited to soldiers and were also common among civilians. They were often performed during village festivals and combined with dance, masks, acrobatics, and competitive games. Martial activity also served as a form of basic physical education.

Throughout their history, Koreans relied more heavily on bows and arrows in warfare than they did on close-range weapons. The composite bow was the primary battlefield weapon, and military training focused more on ranged combat and discipline. This emphasis on archery strongly influenced the development of Korean martial traditions.

However, close range weapons too were used widely and well throughout much of Korean history. During the Three Kingdoms Period, Swords, Battle axes, Spears, and Bow and arrow were the main weapons. In Goryeo Dynasty, main weapons besides the bow were swords and spears. However, during the first half of the Joseon Dynasty, the removal of swordsmanship from military evaluations, emphasis on archery and firearms, and absence of widescale war caused the decline in close range capabilities in the Korean army.

Most evidence for early martial practices comes from archaeological remains, such as tomb murals from the Goguryeo period, and later historical sources rather than detailed instructional texts. As a result, their specific techniques and training methods are not well documented. These early practices became more visible in historical records during the Three Kingdoms period.

=== Three Kingdoms ===
During the Three Kingdoms period (57 BCE–668 CE), Goguryeo, Baekje, and Silla were often in conflict with one another. Therefore, martial practices were important in both military and civilian life. These included unarmed activities such as armed skills like swordsmanship, spear fighting, archery, horseback riding but also unarmed combat like Gakjeo (known today as Ssireum) and Subak (수박, 手搏).

Subak refers to a category of unarmed combat practices that emphasized upright fighting using strikes and grappling. It was practiced by both soldiers and civilians and appears in historical records as a general term rather than a clearly defined martial art. Because descriptions are limited, the exact techniques and methods of subak during this period are not known. Some scholars have noted similarities between subak and Chinese unarmed combat practices such as shoubo (手搏). This suggests possible influence through cultural exchange, but the exact relationship remains uncertain. A comparative study on ancient cultural exchange suggests that early Japanese Sumo shares a strong cultural identity with historical unarmed martial arts transmitted through the Korean peninsula, originating from ritualistic combat styles linked to ancestral and funeral rites. In broader historiographical contexts, these peninsular unarmed fighting traditions are frequently classified under terms like Subak. Historical records of cultural exchange indicate that Korean bare-handed martial arts, such as Subak, shared similar technical characteristics and competitive styles with Japanese jujutsu, with documented instances of practitioners historically competing against one another.

In the ancient period during Baekje dynasty, this sword spread from Baekje to other regions. According to the research of Professor Suh Yeong-kyo, a specialist in ancient Korean history, evidence indicates that a culture of combat—such as one-on-one duels using melee weapons among heavy cavalrymen existed in ancient Korea, including during the Three Kingdoms period.

Martial practices during this period were also influenced by institutions. During the Silla period (57 BCE–935 CE), the Hwarang were an elite youth group that emphasized classical education, ritual practice, moral education, loyalty, and physical training. They are associated with martial activity and sometimes credited with contributing to the unification of the peninsula by Silla in the 7th century. Hwarang is described by Russian-Korean historian, Vladimir Tikhonov (Pak Noja), as "sweet young men." Tikhonov indicated that, from the standards of Silla Kingdom they were considered soft and affectionate people, but the reason why Hwarang were associated with military and referred to as warriors and knights is because the heavily militarized Korean societies of the Three Kingdoms Period had strict military laws and traditions that rewarded bravery and punished cowardice, and with the rest of the society, Hwarang too were required to become warriors and serve in the military. Surviving historical sources do not describe a formalized martial arts system. As a result, the actual martial role of the Hwarang’s and their influence in the development of later martial traditions is debated.

=== Koryo (935-1392) ===
During the Goryeo dynasty (918–1392), martial practices were closely linked to military service and social advancement. The kingdom faced repeated threats, including invasions by the Khitan, Jurchen, and later Mongols, as well as raids by Japanese pirates. These conflicts made practical fighting ability highly valued. Archery and cavalry continued to dominate battlefield tactics, but unarmed combat, especially subak, was also valued for training, competition, and display. Subak competitions (subakhui) were popular and sometimes patronized by the royal court, with kings reportedly taking part in demonstration. Skilled fighters could gain social or political advancement.

Although no manuals from this period survive, Goryeo represents a period of continuity and gradual formalization of earlier martial traditions before the more documented Joseon era.

=== Joseon (1392-1910) ===
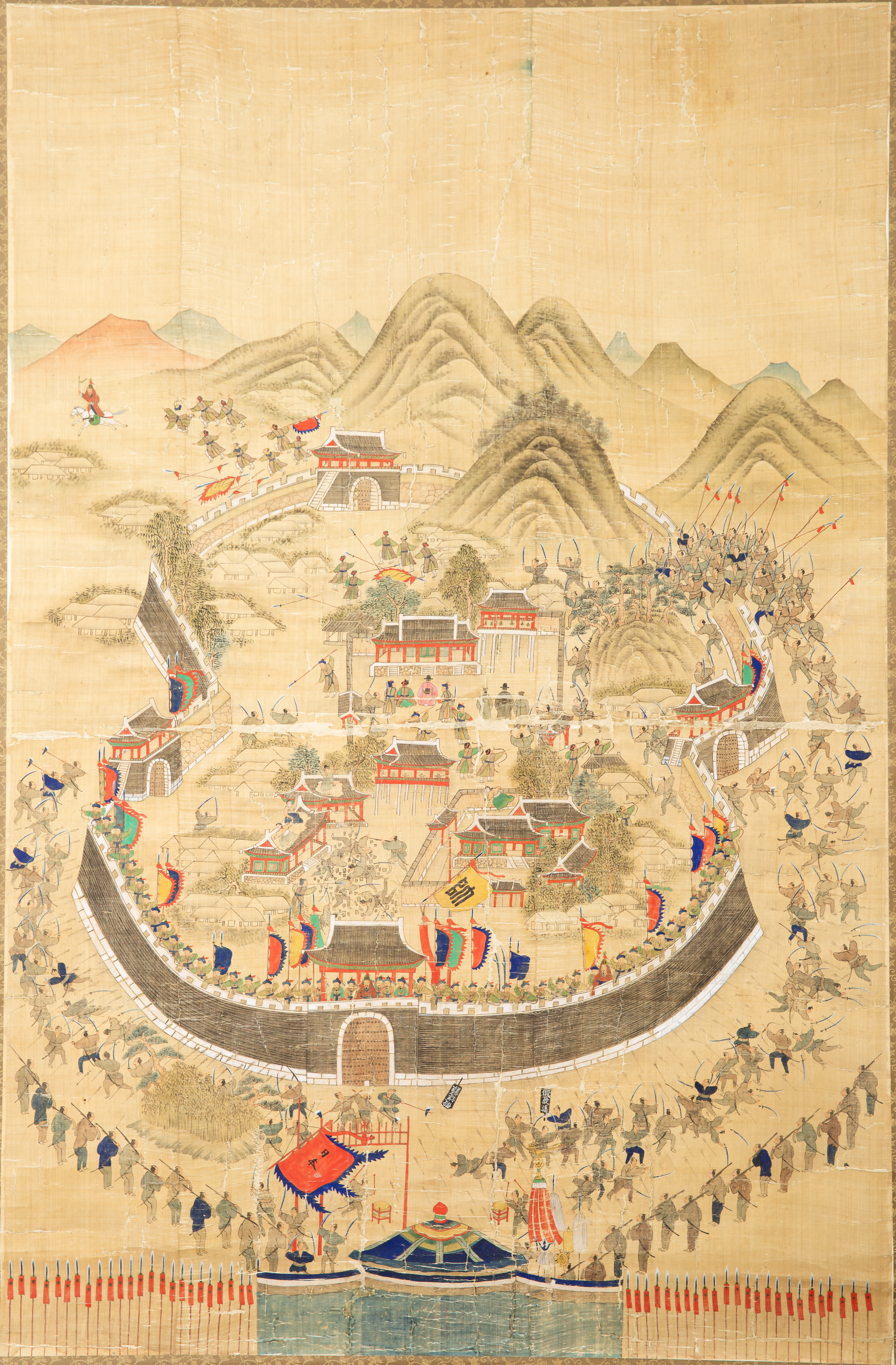
"Siege of Dongnae" Japanese army dual wielding swords while attacking the town of Dongnae. All Korean Soldiers are armed with the composite bow.

During the Joseon dynasty, martial practices were shaped by both external threats and internal ideological priorities. The new state ideology Neo-Confucianism emphasized civil scholarship over military pursuits, but martial training remained necessary for national defense. This tensions resulted in uneven state support for martial activities.

During the 1592–1598 Japanese invasions of Korea, Korea received help from China and was exposed both to Japanese and China military practices. In 1593, Korean troops encountered the Chinese military manual titled Ji Xiao Xin Shu (紀效新書), written by the Chinese military strategist Qi Jiguang. King Seonjo (1567–1608) took a personal interest in the book and promoted it. This led to the creation of the Muyejebo (무예제보; 武藝諸譜) in 1599 by Han Gyo, who had studied the use of several weapons with the Chinese army. Soon this book was revised into the Muyesinbo (무예신보; 武藝新譜), and expanded into the illustrated Muyedobotongji (1790). This manual is considered a key source for late Joseon military practices.

The Muyedobotongji documents eighteen martial disciplines, mostly weapon-based such as sword, spear, staff, flail, archery, and mounted combat. Unarmed techniques appear under the term Kwonbeop (권법; 拳法) and play a limited role compared to weapon training. Kwonbeop is the Korean rendition of the Chinese term Quan fa.

While archery remained important, Joseon forces also quickly adopted firearms introduced by the invading Japanese armies, integrating matchlock weapons alongside traditional bows.

Starting from the 17th century aside from the Japanese and Manchu invasions, Joseon experienced long periods of relative peace, which reduced the practical role of martial training. References to subak decline after the 15th century, suggesting diminished official recognition. Some unarmed practices increasingly took the form of competitive activities during folk festivals. Taekkyon, for instance, often regarded as Korea’s oldest surviving martial art, appears in late 18th-century sources.

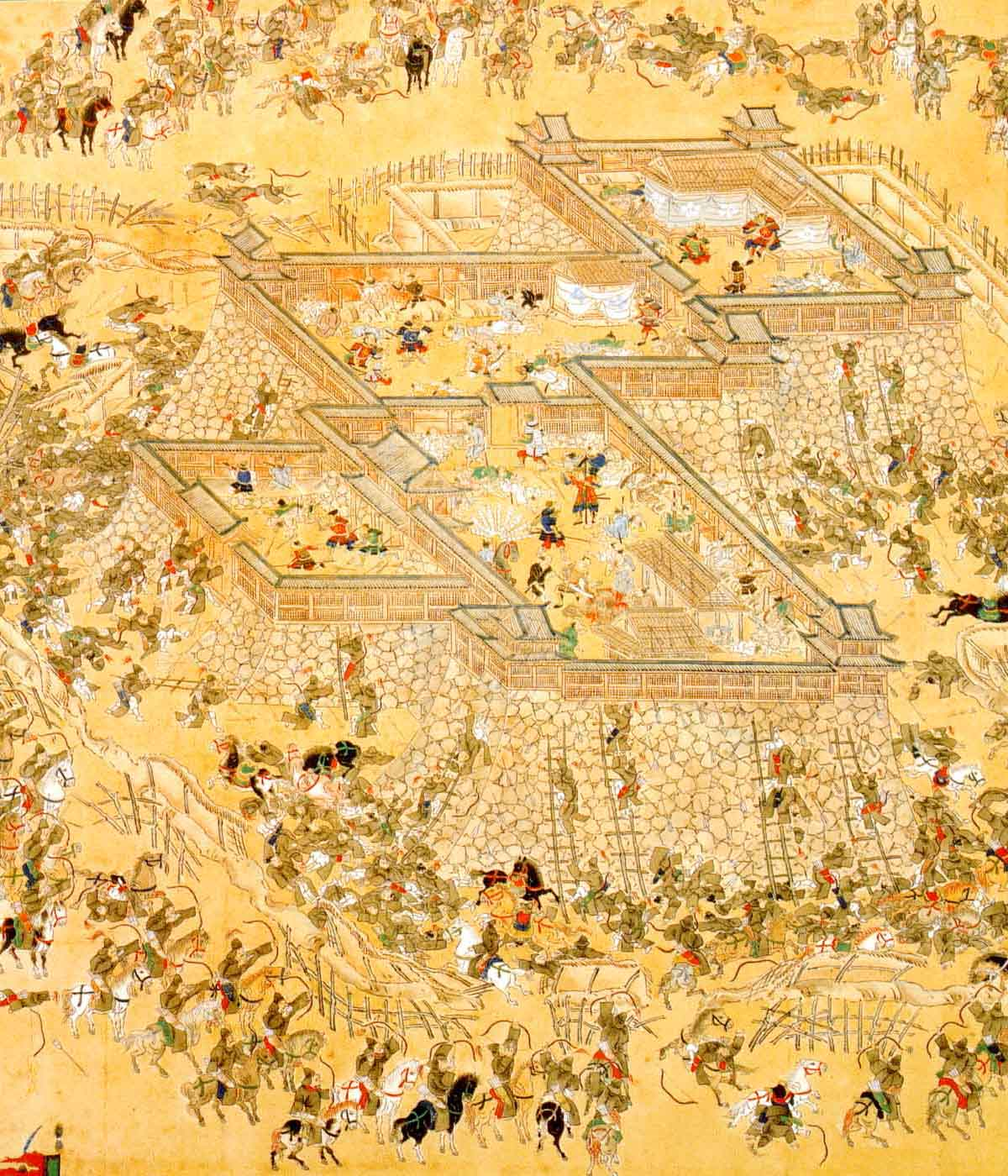
Korean Army under Gwon Yul attacking the Japanese Castle at Ulsan, commanded by Katō Kiyomasa. Note that the entire formation is archers, as painted by the Japanese.

In the late 19th century, amid modernization efforts, Emperor Gojong introduced reforms that included foreign military instruction. In 1899, Emperor Gojong, with the encouragement of the visiting Prince Heinrich of Prussia, established gungdo as an official sport.

=== Japanese occupation (1910–1945) ===
During the occupation period, many Korean martial practices were suppressed or discouraged. At the same time, Japanese martial arts—including judo and kendo—were actively promoted through the education system, police training, and military institutions. As a result, Japanese martial disciplines became widespread among Koreans, influencing both training methods and organizational structures.

Despite these restrictions, certain indigenous practices survived. Ssireum (traditional wrestling) and gungdo (Korean archery) continued to be practiced, often in informal settings or as part of cultural festivals. Both arts experienced renewed popularity during this period and established formal federations in 1920, which continue to exist today. In contrast, other traditional martial practices such as taekkyon declined sharply and came close to disappearing entirely.

=== After liberation and in second half of the 20th century (1945-1999) ===
After Korea’s liberation in 1945, martial arts developed in a context of reconstruction, political change, and strong nationalism. During this period, Japanese martial arts such as Daitō-ryū Aiki-jūjutsu, karate, judo, and kendo were already widespread due to the colonial education system, while Chinese martial arts had a more limited influence.

In the immediate postwar period, these practices were taught under various names, including Tang Soo Do, Kong Soo Do, Kwon Bop... Many new Korean martial arts systems later emerged by adapting these practices and reorganizing them to fit modern needs. Taekwondo and Hapkido became the most prominent of these arts. Although their techniques were largely influenced by Japanese martial arts, their founders emphasized Korean identity and historical continuity, often through terminology, symbolism, and naming.

Behind the development of Taekwondo and Hapkido, several hybrid martial arts also appeared, including Hwa Rang Do, Hankido, and Kuk Sool. These systems blended elements from various sources and reflected experimentation during this period.

From the 1960s to the 1970s, South Korea’s military governments actively supported certain martial arts, particularly Taekwondo. In the context of the Cold War, the division of the Peninsula, and tensions with North Korea, martial arts were promoted for military training, national discipline, and international recognition. Taekwondo was standardized, institutionalized, and promoted as a national sport, eventually becoming an Olympic discipline.

At the same time, interest grew in older indigenous practices. Taekkyon, which had nearly disappeared, experienced a revival through the efforts of Song Deok-gi (송덕기; 1893–1987), the last Taekkyon practitioner of the Joseon dynasty. In 1983, Song was designated a holder of an Important Intangible Cultural Property, making Taekkyon the first Korean martial art to receive official cultural recognition. In 2011, Taekkyon was inscribed on UNESCO’s Intangible Cultural Heritage of Humanity list.

Also during this period, not only Japanese martial arts but also other foreign martial arts, such as Boxing, Muay Thai, American Kickboxing, Oriental Rules Kickboxing, and Professional wrestling directly or indirectly influenced martial arts in Korea. Along with the traditional martial arts previously mentioned, different modern martial arts and combat sports emerged in Korea in the 20th century as well, and they include Kyukgido, GongKwon Yusul, Kyeok Too Ki, and Kunguk-Do.

=== Korean martial arts in the 21st century ===
In the 21st century, modern Mixed martial arts and Brazilian jiu-jitsu became known worldwide and in Korea. However, some Korean martial arts continued to develop separately from these global trends. For example, Yongmudo was created in 2001 when professors of Yong In University came together, combining their martial arts and combat sports programs into a single hybrid modern martial art and a sport.

== Types of Korean martial arts ==
After Korea’s liberation, new martial arts developed as masters experimented with different styles and created systems suited to modern needs. Over time, some schools began emphasizing connections to traditional Korean martial arts and cultural heritage, though in many cases these links were largely symbolic rather than based on continuous practice

=== Tae Kwon Do ===
Tae Kwon Do (Korean: 태권도; Hanja: 跆拳道) is the national martial art of both Korean states and an Olympic sport. It is arguably the most recognized of the Korean martial arts. It is a stand-up martial art known for its fast, high, and varied kicking techniques, jumps, and, to a lesser extent, hand strikes. After the Japanese surrender in 1945, there were only five Kwans teaching Korean karate, such as Tang Soo Do or Kong Soo Do. The Korean War followed, and Korea split into North and South Korea. On April 11, 1955, the martial arts style developed by Choi Hong-hi was presented to the public under the name "Taekwon-Do". This consolidated the names previously in use under this single name. In the 1950s and 1960s, Choi Hong-hi traveled with a demonstration team to spread Taekwon-Do beyond Korea. The International Taekwon-Do Federation (ITF) was founded in Seoul on March 22, 1966. Choi Hong-hi became the first president of the ITF. Due to differences with South Korean President Park Chung-hee, Choi left South Korea and emigrated 1972 to Canada. Thereupon, Park ordered the establishment of a new organization alongside the ITF: the World Taekwondo Federation (WTF) and the Kukkiwon, founded in 1972, was to become the headquarters. The name Choi Hong-hi and his works were to be erased from the memory of the South Korean people. This led to the formation of two organizations: the ITF, which incorporates ″Taekwon-Do″, and WTF ″Taekwondo″, which developed a new sport style from the Korean karate of the nine Kwans established in 1973 as the governing body for Olympic-style competition. The Kukkiwon manages standardized training, belt promotion, and certification worldwide. Both Choi Hong-hi's Taekwon-Do and the Taekwondo founded by Park, which is represented at the Olympic Games, have many followers worldwide.

=== Hapkido ===
Hapkido (합기도 / 合氣道) developed in the mid-20th century, following the end of Japanese colonial rule. It emphasizes self-defense through a combination of joint locks, throws, strikes, and circular movement, and is known for integrating both unarmed and weapon-based techniques.

Though its origins are unclear, Hapkido is associated with Choi Yong-sul (최용술; 1904–1986), who began teaching in Korea after the Korean War. Choi had spent several decades in Japan, where he studied Daitō-ryū Aiki-jūjutsu, and his teachings formed the foundation of the art. Several of Choi’s students, including Seo Bok-seob (First student: 서복섭), Ji Han-jae (지한재; 1936-2026) and Kim Moo-hong (김무홍), helped systematize and promote Hapkido, including the development of its kicking techniques. Because of its early development by different instructors, Hapkido has no single standard curriculum, and training varies among schools and organizations.

=== Taekkyon/Taekkyeon ===
Taekkyon (택견 or 태껸) is one of Korea’s oldest traditional martial arts. It is a fighting system known for its fluid, rhythmic, and dance‑like movements. It emphasizes footwork (pumbalbgi), kicks, trips, throws, and unbalancing techniques.

While difficult to fully retrace, Taekkyon has a recorded history dating back at least to the 18th century. During the Joseon period, it was widely practiced both as a combat technique by militaries and security forces and as a folk game among common people.

During the Japanese occupation, indigenous martial traditions were suppressed, and Taekkyeon was nearly wiped out. After the Korean War, most traditional practice had disappeared. Song Deok‑gi (1893-1987) was the last master to preserve pre-war Taekkyon.

After decades of obscurity, efforts to revive the art succeeded. On June 1, 1983, Taekkyeon was designated Important Intangible Cultural Property No. 76 by the South Korean government, the first Korean martial art with this status. In November 2011, it was inscribed on UNESCO’s Representative List of the Intangible Cultural Heritage of Humanity, becoming the first martial art to receive that distinction.

=== Ssireum ===
Ssireum (씨름) is probably the oldest martial discipline of Korea, with roots in antiquity. It involves two competitors grappling while holding a cloth belt (satba) tied around the waist and thigh, aiming to throw the opponent to the ground. Matches are held on a sand arena, a defining feature of the sport.

Historically, ssireum was a very popular folk game and a form of physical training, commonly practiced during festivals and seasonal celebrations. Unlike many other martial arts, ssireum survived into the modern era with relatively clear continuity and was formalized as a modern sport in the 20th century.

Modern ssireum is divided into weight categories traditionally named after mountains—Taebaek, Geumgang, Halla, and Baekdu, progressing from lighter to heavier weight classes.

Today, ssireum is officially recognized as an important element of Korean cultural heritage. In 2017, it was designated an Important Intangible Cultural Property No. 131 by the South Korean government, and in 2018, it was inscribed on UNESCO Intangible Cultural Heritage Lists, jointly recognized by both South and North Korea.

=== Tang Soo Do/Soo Bahk Do ===
Tang Soo Do (당수도 / 唐手道) uses the same Chinese characters once employed for karate, meaning “China Hand”. Tang Soo Do is primarily based on Karate as taught to Koreans during the Japanese occupation, with later indigenous influences. The art emphasizes striking techniques including punches, kicks, and blocks, and combines self-defense, physical conditioning, and sparring.

The first Tang Soo Do school opened in Seoul in 1944 under Lee Won-guk (1907-2003). It became widely practiced after the Liberation, forming the first generation of modern Korean martial arts. Some of the Tang Soo Do masters were instrumental in the development of modern Taekwondo. Before the unification of the Kwans in the 1960s–70s, it was sometimes exported internationally as “Korean Karate”. Notable practitioners include actor Chuck Norris, who received his first martial arts training in this style.

Soo Bahk Do, developed by martial artist Hwang Kee (1914-2002) in the 1960's, is a modern branch of Tang Soo Do, inspired in part by Gwonbeop and Hwang’s interpretation of the manual Muyedobotongji. Both arts are widely practiced internationally today.

Despite the similar names, Soo Bahk Do and Subak are two different and unrelated martial arts.

=== Korean archery (Gungdo) ===
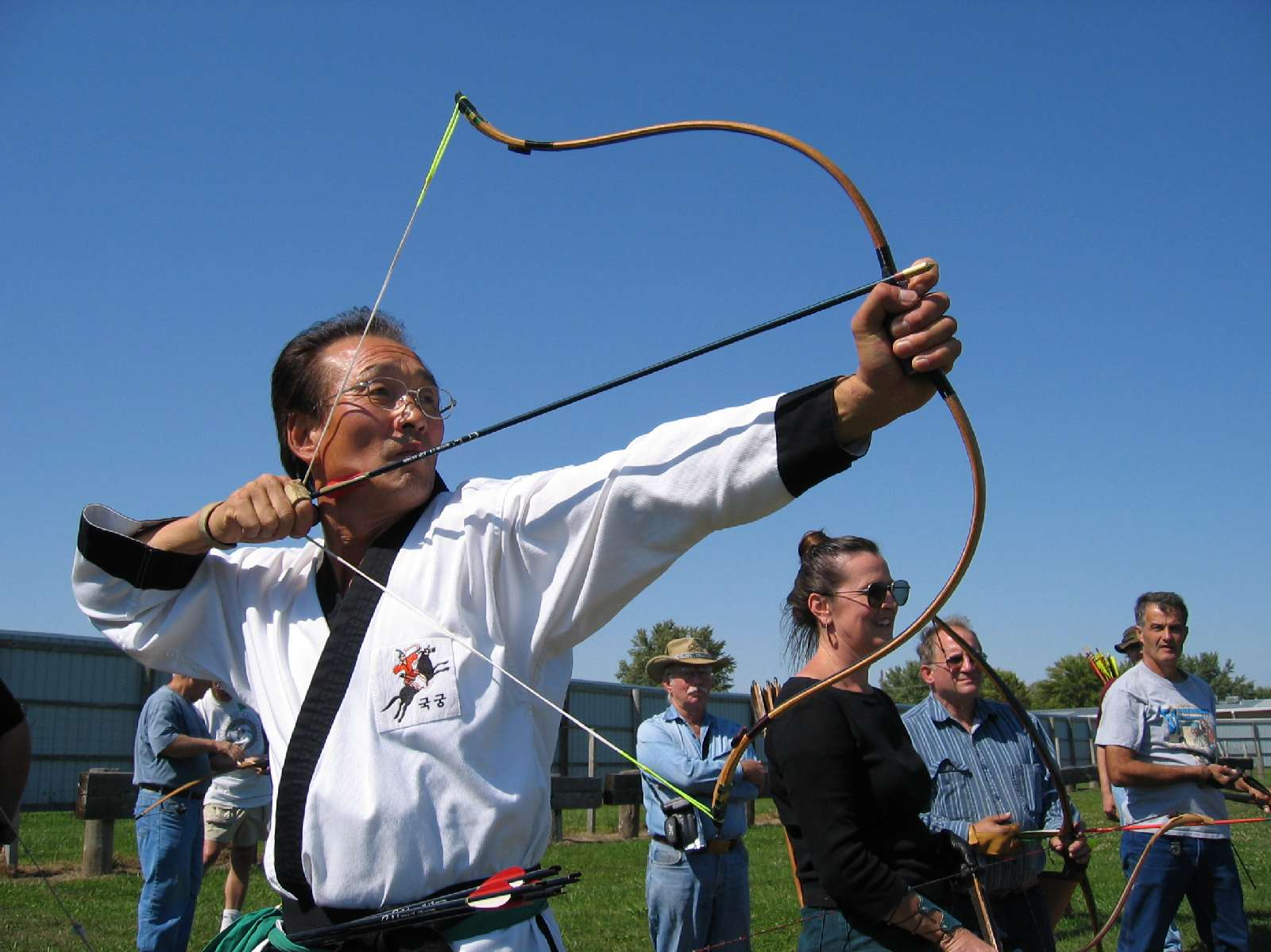
Heon Kim using a modern Korean composite bow

The composite bow (or Gakkung) was Korea’s primary weapon of war for centuries, recorded as early as the 1st century BCE. Korean legends celebrate archery as a symbol of skill and leadership: Go Jumong, the founder of Goguryeo, was said to catch five flies with a single arrow, and Park Hyeokgeose, the first king of Silla, was also reputedly a master archer.

Bows played a central role in Korean warfare. Even after firearms were introduced, archers remained important for their speed, accuracy, and mobility. During the Imjin Wars (1592–1598), Korean archers continued to play a key role in defending the country.

Archery was also a cultural practice. It was part of rituals, military training, and elite education. It symbolized discipline, focus, and the cultivation of both mind and body. During the Japanese occupation, the practice of gungdo was not as severely affected as other martial arts and continued in cultural and educational settings.

Today, traditional Korean archery, known as gungdo (국도), continues as a living art. It was designated National Intangible Cultural Heritage No. 142 in 2020.

=== Korean swordsmanship ===
Korean swordsmanship, known as geom sul (劍術) or geom beop (劍法), has roots in the Three Kingdoms period, though the earliest detailed manuals date to the 17th and 18th centuries. Key sources include the Muyejebo (1610), Muyeshinbo (1759), and Muyedobotongji (1790). These manuals emphasize cutting, thrusting, and footwork for battlefield use rather than dueling, reflecting the influence of Buddhist and Neo-Confucian thought.

During the Joseon Dynasty (1392–1897), swords were used both as military weapons and ceremonial symbols, with curved single-handed sabers (to) becoming standard for soldiers. Military manuals organized techniques into sequences or forms (hyeong) for training, while observers noted that swords were part of a broader arsenal including bows, muskets, and polearms.

Korean sword practice was heavily affected by the Japanese occupation during which modern Japanese kendo was introduced as to Korea. The sport-focused development of kendo techniques along with the addition of traditional forms of Korean swordsmanship from Muyedobot'ongji led to the creation of kumdo, which influenced police and military instruction. After 1945, efforts to revive historical Korean sword methods led to the development of modern styles such as Sib Pal Gi, Shim Gum Do, Hankumdo, Haidong Gumdo... In practice, though, modern Korean sword arts are often a blend: traditional Korean techniques adapted into modern training methods influenced by Japanese kendo.

=== Modern martial arts and combat sports ===
20th century saw the emergence of modern Korean martial arts and combat sports. They include Kyukgido, GongKwon Yusul, Kyeok Too Ki, and Kunguk-Do. Yongmudo appeared afterwards in the 21st century.

== See also ==
- Bulmudo (in German)
- Gungdo
- Hwa Rang Do
- Sunmudo
- Taekkyon
- Yongmudo
