= Taekkyon =

Traditional Korean martial art

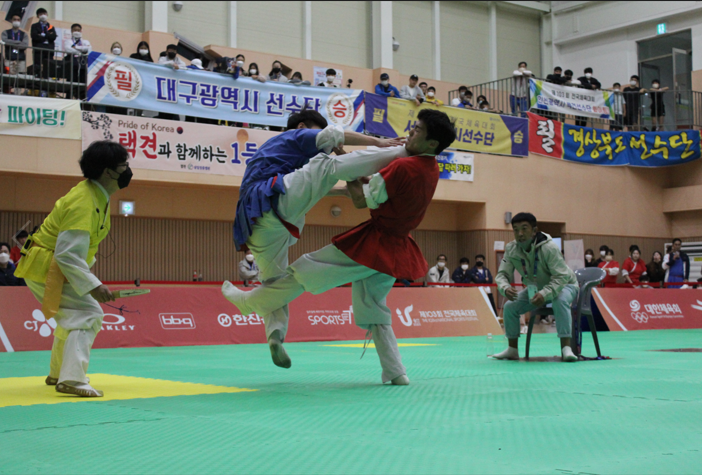
- Also known as: Taekgyeon, Taekkyeon, Taekyun
- Focus: Sport version: Kicks, Throws, Hybrid Yetbeop Taekkyeon: Various open-hand strikes, Punches, Elbows, Knees, Kicks, Throws, Clinch fighting Self defense: also includes Joint locks
- Hardness: Full-contact
- Country of origin: Korea
- Date of formation: Documented since the 18th century
- Famous practitioners: Yoo Hyun-woo, Ju Pyo Hong
- Parenthood: Subak
- Official website: Four associations: www.koreataekkyon.com; www.krtga.com; www.taekyun.org; taekkyeon.net; wtkf.org

Taekkyon
- UNESCO Intangible Cultural Heritage
- Country: Korea
- Reference: 452
- Region: Asia and the Pacific

Inscription history
- Inscription: 2011 (6th session)
- List: Representative
- UNESCO Cultural Heritage

Taekkyon (Korean: 택견; 태껸; Korean pronunciation: [tʰɛk̚k͈jʌn]), also spelled taekkyeon, is a traditional Korean martial art and a combat sport. It is characterized by a fluid, dynamic footwork called pumbalbgi, or "stepping-on-triangles". Taekkyon includes hand and foot techniques to unbalance, trip, or throw the opponent. In competitive taekkyon points are scored by throwing the opponent or landing kicks on their head. A taekkyon practitioner is called a "taekkyon-kkun". Practitioners, referees, and coaches wear taekkyon uniforms, which today are based on traditional garments such as the gouijeoksam, or, depending on the school, the cheollik for competitions.

Since the twentieth century, taekkyon has come to be seen as a living link to Korea's past. As such, it has provided historical references for modern Korean martial arts and is often considered as the oldest martial discipline of Korea. It was almost wiped out during the Japanese occupation, before being rediscovered after the Korean War. It influenced the name and conceptualization of taekwondo.

Taekkyon was the first martial art listed as a UNESCO Intangible Cultural Heritage in 2011. It is also the 76th Intangible Cultural Property of South Korea.

== History ==
The earliest written source of the term appears during the reign of King Jeongjo (1776–1800) of the Joseon dynasty, in the book Jaemulbo (also Manmulbo), which included an entry about a 2nd-century Book of Han reference of contests of unarmed combat. In this entry, author Lee Sung-Ji extended a 3rd-century annotation of this reference to say that such competitions were like the taekkyon of his time:

"Byeon: Byeon is hand to hand combat (Subak), competing in a martial game, like today's Taekkyon."

The word Taekkyon is written in Hangul, which denotes its connection with the common people while the rest is written in Hanja.

Song Deok-gi (1893-1987) who was the main source of the taekkyon revival after the occupation, wrote in the preface of his only book: "It cannot be said for sure when and how Taekkyon came into existence, but until the end of the Korean kingdom, certain people did Taekkyon together."

- Taekkyon
- Hangul: 택견; 태껸
- RR: taekgyeon; taekkyeon
- MR: t'aekkyŏn; t'aekkyŏn
- IPA: tʰɛk̚k͈jʌn

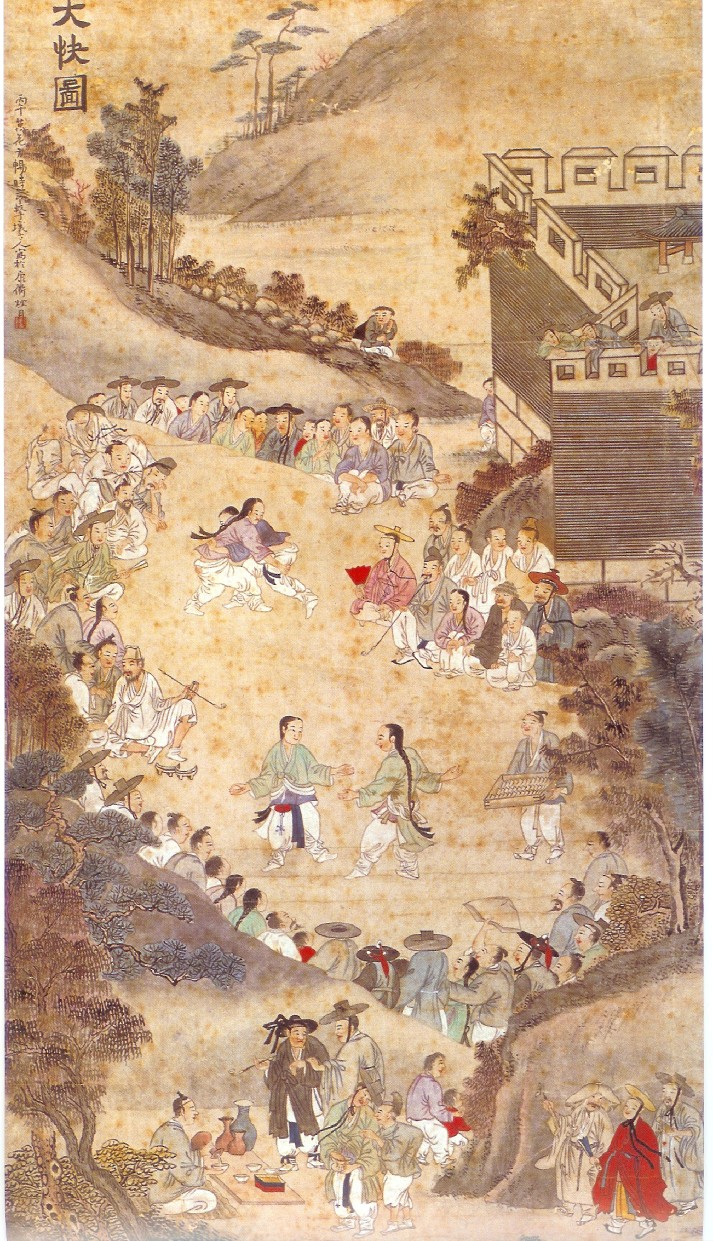
Yu Suk (1827-1873) Daekwaedo. It shows matches of ssireum and taekkyon.

Taekkyon was documented for the first time in the West by anthropologist Stewart Culin in his book Korean Games, written in 1895. In the 1921 book Haedong Jukji (East Sea Annals) by Choe Yeong-nyeon, taekkyon is called "flying leg technique". Taekkyon was widely practiced during the Joseon period. Two versions existed at the time: one for combat application used by militaries, the other as a game, very popular among lower classes alongside ssireum (Korean wrestling). Both combat sports were often seen at festivals, attended by all social classes. For example, during the Dan-O-Festival, a tournament called Gyeoll-yeon-Taekkyon was held. Players who beat five opponents consecutively could take a rest and re-enter the tournament again later.

Taekkyon's popularity declined as Neo-Confucianism became widespread among the elite and it underwent a long period of decline toward the end of the Joseon Dynasty. At the dawn of the 20th century, it was only practiced around the capital city of Hanyang (Seoul), in the district of Jongro. The subsequent Japanese occupation prohibited gatherings of people and indigenous fighting techniques, which nearly made the art extinct.

After the Korean War there was only one surviving master: Song Deok-gi, who was part of the last generation that received a traditional education under the tutelage of renowned Master Im Ho (1870's?~1920's?). After the passing of his master, Song had maintained his practice in secret throughout the Japanese occupation. The style he practiced was called Widae (high-village) after his village of Sajik. Song was critical in the preservation of taekkyon due to his link to pre-war teachings. After a martial arts demonstration given for then-president Syngman Rhee's birthday, he was revealed to the public on 26 March 1958 and became known as the "Last Taekkyon Master of the Joseon Dynasty".

Nonetheless, taekkyon did not enjoy a sudden resurgence, faced with lack of interest from the general public and competition from modern martial disciplines. Despite sporadic interest by taekwondo figures (such as Park Chul-hee, Kim Byeong-su, Im Chang-su...), taekkyon remained relatively obscure. Lee Jun-seo and Ko Yong-woo, the two earliest known students of Song (and current leaders of the Widae Taekkyon Preservation Association) started their training during that period.

On June 1, 1983, taekkyon was designated an Important Intangible Cultural Asset by the Korean government, through the effort of Song's pupil, Shin Han-seung (1928-1987).

After two unsuccessful registration attempts, Shin, himself a physical educator, created a modern training system by adapting methods from other martial arts and sports. This new system introduced several innovations that were originally absent from the original taekkyon such as pre-arranged forms (bonddae-boigi), a formal ranking system and overall, a re-conception of taekkyon as a sanitized, modern sport. While these efforts helped taekkyon gain official recognition, they also created a rift within the community between modernists and preservers.

Following this honor, both Song Deok-gi and Shin Han-seung were given living national treasure status. Taekkyon is one of two Korean martial arts to receive this recognition, the other being Ssireum. Since then, taekkyon has enjoyed a renaissance with the establishment of university clubs, the opening of new schools, and active promotional efforts from the government and associations alike. The first contemporary taekkyon competition took place in Busan on June 30, 1985.

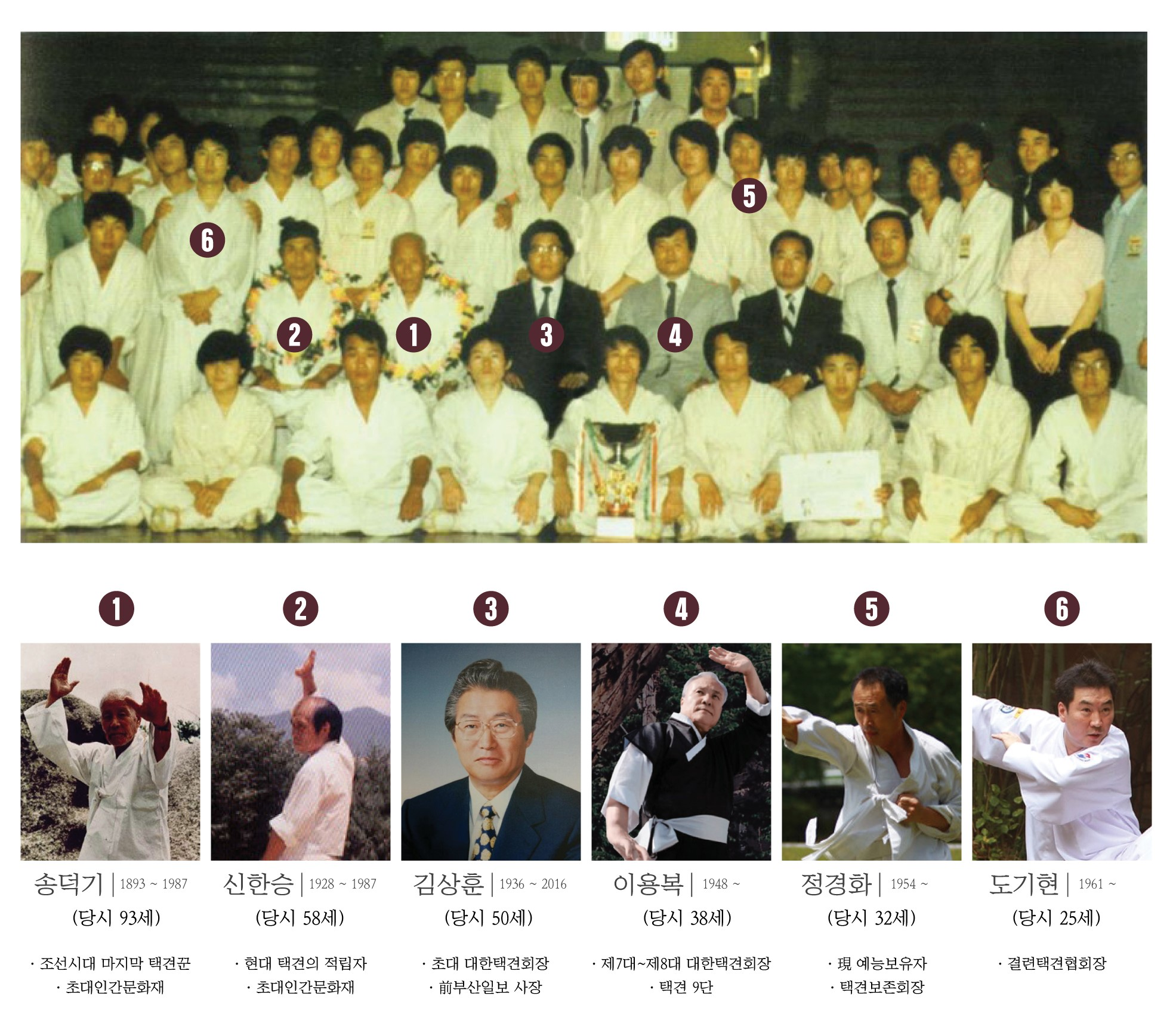
People who participated the first national Taekkyon competition.

After more than 70 years of public disappearance, this competition was a landmark event that marked the return of taekkyon as an organized modern sport. Song Deok-ki and Shin Han-seung demonstrated respectively mack-boigi, and bonddae-boigi. Future leaders of taekkyon's modern associations, Lee Yong-bok (KTF), Jeong Kyung-hwa (KTTA) and Do Ki-hyun (KTA) were also in attendance.

Shin Han-seung and Song Deok-gi died in 1987, twenty days appart. Following their passing, their Important Intangible Cultural Asset status was revoked.

After the death of the two masters, the Taekkyon community was definitively split by the establishment of more separate schools. The followers of Song's teachings, represented by the Widae Taekkyon Preservation Association emphasize the preservation of traditional forms. In contrast, the followers of Shin—whether his direct students or those inspired by his system—pursue a more sport-oriented approach and bringing the art to a global stage.

In November 2011, Taekkyon was recognized by UNESCO and placed on the Intangible Cultural Heritage List, honored as the first martial art on the list.

== Techniques ==
Taekkyon utilizes a wide variety of techniques including kicks, hands, knee, elbow strikes, pressure point attacks, throws, joint locks, headbutts and grapples. The whole body is used in each movement. Although taekkyon primarily utilizes kicking, punching, and arm strikes thrown from a mobile stance and does not provide a framework for groundfighting, it does incorporate a variety of different throws, takedowns, and grappling techniques. The main purpose of taekkyon is to catch the opponent off-guard by using the whole weight of the body and catch the opponent's attack off-balance before returning it against them.

The basic pumbalki footwork is geometric and at the core of all advanced movement. The movements of taekkyon are fluid with the practitioners constantly moving. One of its most striking characteristics is the motion called ogumsil or neung-cheong: It is a constant bending and stretching of the knees, giving taekkyon a dance-like appearance. This motion is also used in the Korean mask dance talchum which gives them a similar flow. The art is like a dance in which the fighter constantly changes stance from left to right by stepping forward and backwards with arms up and ready to guard, blending arm movements with leg. Taekkyon does not make use of abrupt knee motions. The principles and methods used to extend the kick put more emphasis on grace and alignment for whole-body strength, as with the arm motions.

=== Pumbalki (footwork) ===
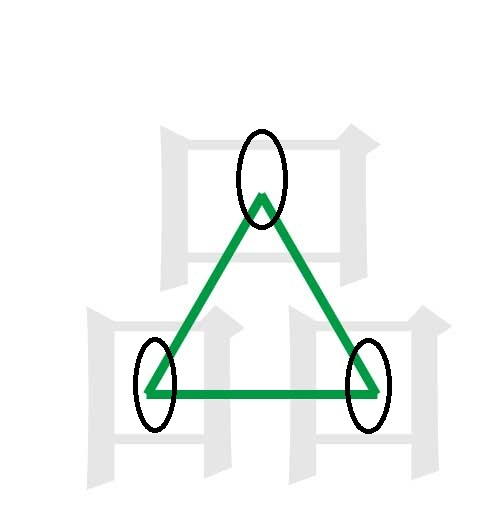
Position of the steps in Pumpalki.

The most unique feature of taekkyon is its triangular footwork called pumbalki or pum balbki (품밟기) which looks like a dance. The meaning of pumbalkki is "to step the pum". Pum is the hanja 品, which means "goods" or "level" but it is used for its triangular shape rather than its meaning. Footwork is smooth and rhythmic and enables rapid shifting of the center of gravity. It has the effect of strengthening the waist and lower part of the body as well as harmonizing attack and defense. It is practiced in place, but in competition it involves continually advancing or retreating.

=== Hwalgaejit (deceptive arm movements) ===
Hwalgaejit looks like the movement of a bird's wings. Coming from the root hwalgae, meaning "deceptive arm and leg movements resembling the movements of butterfly wings," the shoulders are expanded naturally and must flow harmoniously with the footwork. While improving the body's reflexes, responsiveness and balance, it also helps distract the opponent's attention before the counterattack. It is mainly used defensively to block or catch an opponent blow. Hwalgejit transfers power from the body to the arms in order to enhance power for quick action.

=== Baljil (kicks) ===
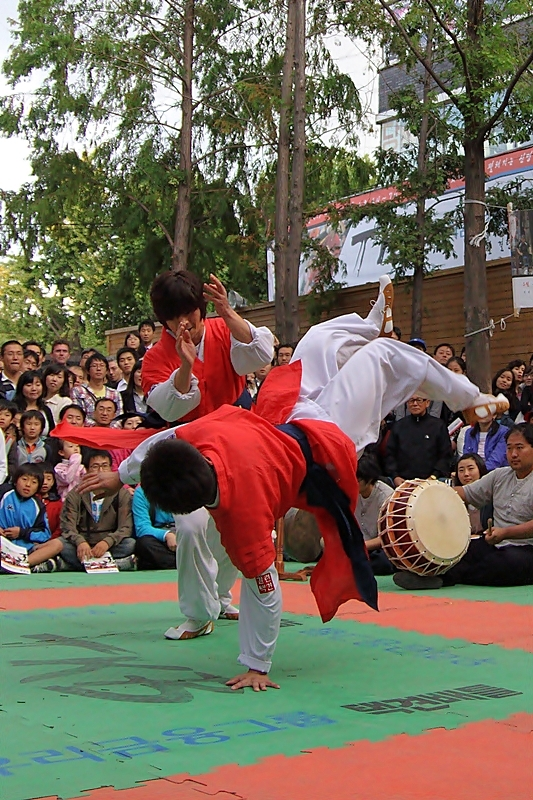
Nal-Chi-Gi

Taekkyon was known for its kicking techniques so ancient chronicles referred to it with poetic names such as "one-hundred godlike flying leg skills" (baek gisintong bigaksul), "leg art" (gak sul), or "flying leg skills" (bi gak sul). Modern taekkyon schools teach a variety of kicks, low, medium, and high, as well as jumps. Sweeps with straight forward low kicks using the ball of the foot and the heel and flowing crescent-like high kicks. There are many kicks that move the leg outward from the middle, which is called gyeot chigi, and inward from the outside using the side of the heels and the side of the feet. The art also uses tricks like inward trips, wall-jumping, fake-outs, tempo, and slide-stepping.

=== Sonjil (strikes) ===
Renowned for the variety of its kicks since ancient times, taekkyon features numerous striking techniques. These target all areas of the body and utilize every part of the arm — including the forearm, elbow, edge of the hand, back of the hand, and fingertips. Techniques must be executed in coordination with the pumbalki so that the springing power can be transferred to the upper limbs. The palm or fist is most often used to strike.

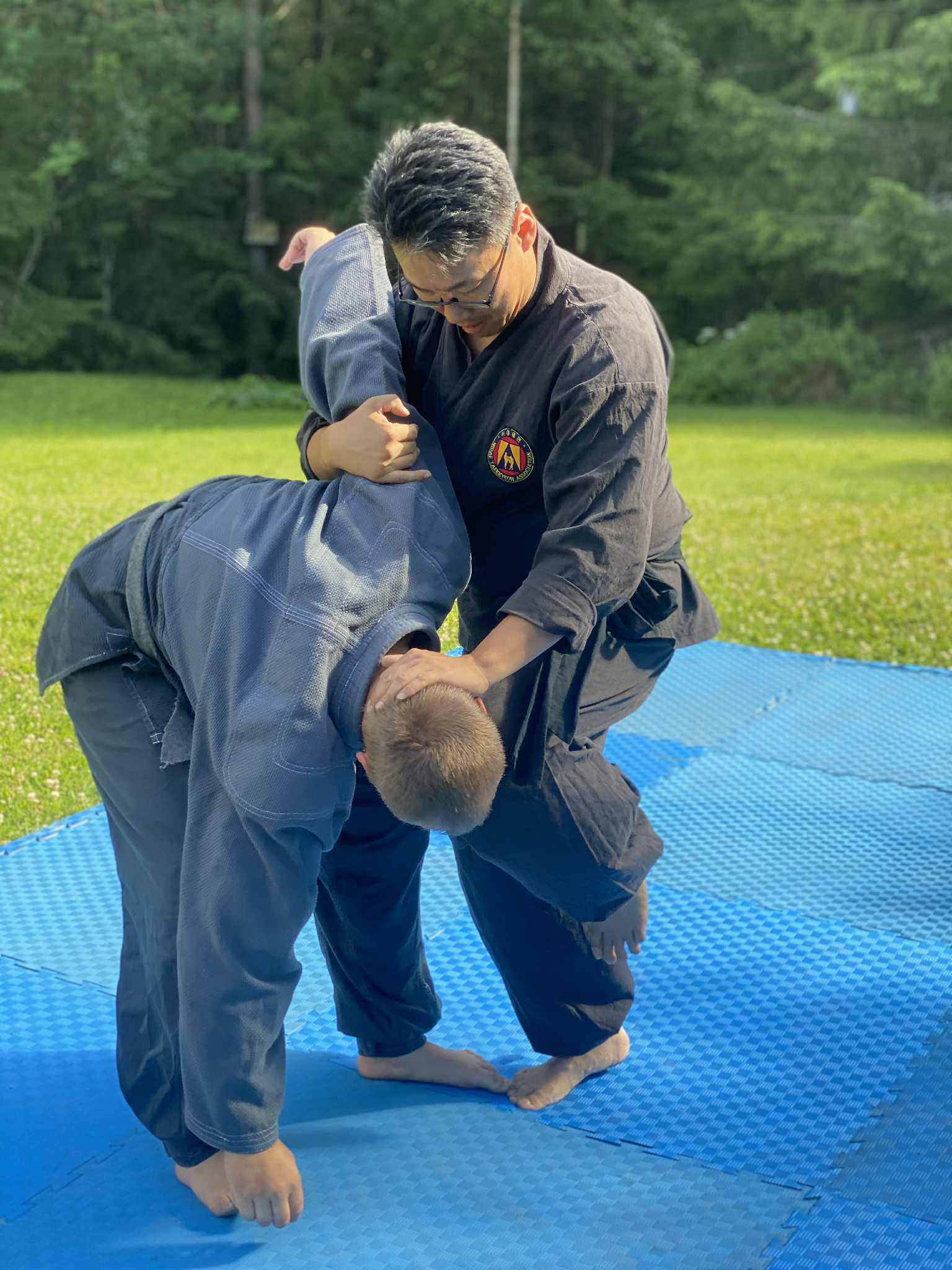
Ttanjuk followed by a muleupchigi knee strike

=== Taejil (throws) ===
Taekkyon uses techniques for throwing the opponent either forward or backward. Once the opponent is unbalanced, the user can follow with either a throw or a trip. The important thing is to use the opponent's own power to counterattack.

=== Ttanjuk (joint locks) ===
Ttanjuk are techniques for locking and twisting an opponent's joints.

== Sport Taekkyon ==
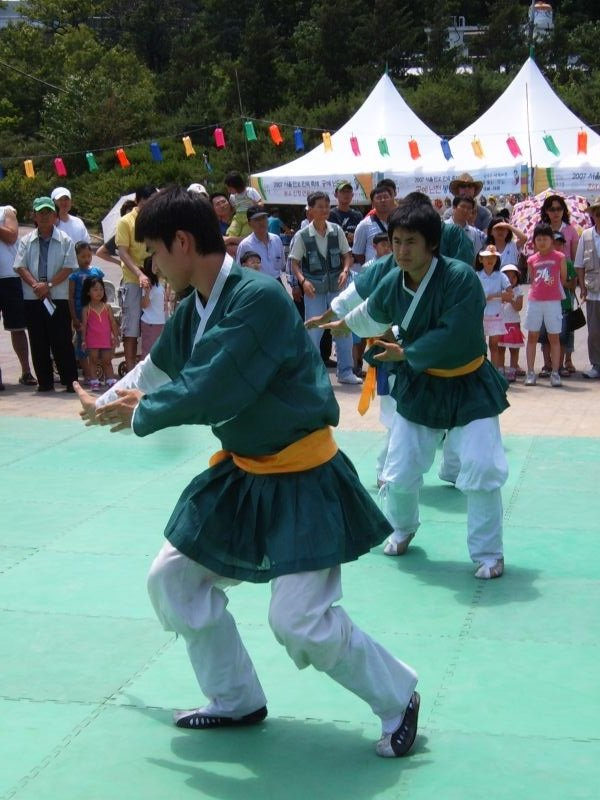
Taekkyon Competition held for Hi! Seoul Festival on April 28, 2007

Taekkyon bouts have evolved into a competitive sport, and the tournaments are held by the three modern schools (KTF, KTTA, KTA) across Korea and it is also an authorized discipline in Korea National Championships. When Taekkyon is practiced in competition, it uses a limited subset of techniques, focusing on grappling and kicking only. Points are scored by throwing (or tripping) the opponent to the ground, pushing them out of the ring, or kicks to the head. There are no hand strikes or headbutts, and purposefully injuring your opponent is prohibited. The head kicks are often quite sharp, but usually not full force, and fighters may not attempt to wear the opponent down with body blows as in boxing or Muay Thai. Matches are sometimes decided by the best of three falls—the first fighter to score two points wins. However, different modern associations employ slightly different rules.

== Yetbeop Taekkyon ==
Yetbeop means "old methods," and this style of Taekkyon not only preserves, practices, and teaches but also applies all aspects of Taekkyon, except joint locks, in sparring. The techniques allowed in sparring include punches,open-handed strikes, elbows, knees, kicks, throws, and clinch fighting.

== Organizations ==
=== Korea Taekkyon Federation ===
The Korea Taekkyon Federation (KTF), sometimes called Daehan Taekkyon, is the largest and most developed taekkyon association globally. Founded in 1991 and based in Seoul Olympic Park it was led by Lee Yong-bok (1948-) until 2015. Originally an 6th Dan in taekwondo, he taught himself taekkyon with a brief stint studying under Song Deok-gi and Shin Han-seung.

The KTF holds a unique official status as the only taekkyon organization recognized by the Korean government's Ministry of Culture, Sports and Tourism and has been a member of the Korean Sport & Olympic Committee (KSOC) since 2007. This official role allows it to act as both the national and international governing body, organizing events like the Korean National Sports Festival, World Martial Arts Masterships, Sports for All Festival and running government-recognized Sports Instructor Courses.

The KTF has been instrumental in shaping the modern perception of taekkyon, promoting it as a non-violent folk-game focused on kicking techniques. With the support of the KSOC, the KTF has produced multi-lingual videos to standardize and disseminate taekkyon rules, referee guidelines, and training courses.

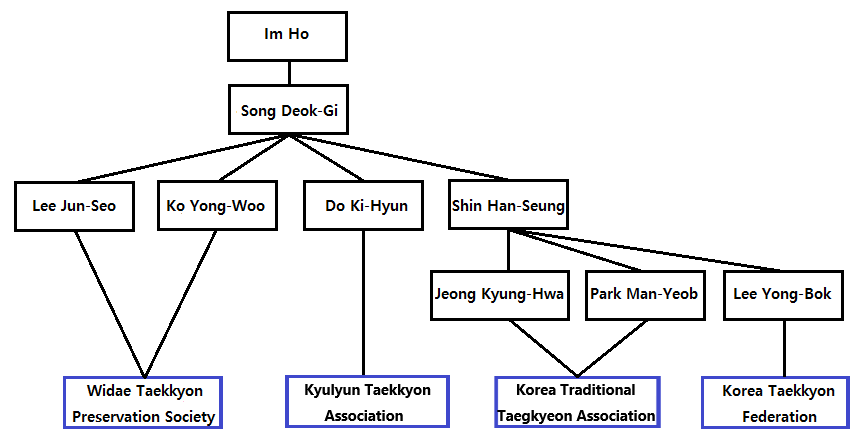
Genealogy of the current schools of taekkyon

=== World Taekkyeon Federation ===
The World Taekkyeon Federation (formerly World Widae Taekkyeon Organization) is founded by Ko Yong-Woo (1952-) the most senior student of Song Deok-gi. The federation, incorporated in 2019, is located in Los Angleles and has member organizations in Korea (Korea Widae Taekkyeon Federation) and Norway (Widae Taekkyeon Norway). Its goal is to educate, promote, and enhance Taekkyeon as competitive martial arts and rich cultural heritage.

=== Widae Taekkyeon Preservation Society ===
The Widae Taekkyeon Preservation Society is based in Seoul and is led by Lee Jun-seo (1962-), who was appointed by Song Deok-gi as the scholarship recipient for the preservation of Taekkyeon. It maintains a purely traditional approach and does not teach the sport science innovations from the mid-1980s and does not hold competitions.

=== Korea Traditional Taegkyeon Association ===
The Korea Traditional Taekkyon Association (KTTA) is headquartered in Chungju, therefore sometimes referred to as Chungju Taekkyon. The KTTA was established by two pupils of Shin Han-seung: Park Man-Yeob (1960-) and Jeong Kyung-hwa (1954-) who was given the title of "living national treasure of the second generation" by the Korean government in 1995. The KTTA was responsible for the recognition of Taekkyon as an Intangible Cultural Heritage of Humanity.

=== Kyulyun Taekyyun Association ===
The Kyulyun Taekyyun Association (KTA), based in Seoul, was established in 2000. The KTK is led by Do Ki-hyun (1962-) who mainly learned from Song Deok-gi after starting his training under Shin Han-Seung. The school is famous for organizing the Taekkyon Battle, one of the most prestigious tournaments of Korea, every year since 2004.

== Ranks ==
Taekkyon did not have a formal ranking structure until the 1970s, when some organizations adopted ranking systems to modernize training. However, due to the fragmented nature of the Taekkyon community, there is no universal standard.

The Korea Taekkyon Association uses the Dan ranking system divided into Pum (품) and Dan (단) grades. Novices begin at 8th Pum and progress to 1st Pum, after which they move up the Dan levels from 1st Dan to 9th Dan, the highest grade.

Similarly, the Korea Traditional Taegkyeon Association uses Jjerae (째) or Dong (동) to indicate rank. Practitioners progress through the 12th Jjerae, which serves as the pre-Dan beginner stage, after which they advance into the Dan levels, starting with 1st Dong (1st Dan), 2nd Dong (2nd Dan), and so on.

Widae Taekkyon does not use a formal ranking system; practitioners’ skill levels are determined by the instructor, in line with its traditionalist approach.

== Uniform ==
In the early days of taekkyon, practitioners wore their everyday clothing to train and compete. One item, the gouijeoksam (고의적삼), has been adapted by each school as a standardized uniform, with slight variations, most notably the school’s crest or blazon. For practical reasons in tournaments, the Daehan Taekkyon Association uses the cheollik (철릭), inspired by clothing from the Goryeo dynasty. At 1st and 2nd dan, it is black with white sleeves and an orange belt. Instructor cheolliks are color-coded by rank: dark green for 3rd–4th dan, navy for 5th–6th, fuchsia for 7th–8th, and black for 9th dan, who wear a silver belt.

== Historical records on Taekkyon, along with Subak and street fighting ==
Medieval records mention that several street fighting games and techniques existed in Korea at the time, up until the twentieth century. Due to the elite's scorn and contempt for martial activities, Martial arts like Taekkyon, along with Subak, came to be perceived as a fighting method for thugs and sometimes confused with such disciplines: Sibak (시박), Pyeonssaum (편싸움), Nalparam (날파람), Nanjanbaksi (난잔박시), Taegyeok (태격). Some barehand techniques for street fighting are currently taught as part of the curriculum of the three modern schools as part of the yetbeop Taekkyon or "old style Taekkyon".

== Taekkyon practitioners in other combat sports ==
Taekkyon expert, Ju Pyo Hong, competed in modern professional Mixed martial arts, winning the Middleweight title in a Korean MMA promotion, Neofight.

South Korean kickboxer, Yoo Hyun-woo, trained in Taekkyon as a foundation before starting Kickboxing. In 2011, Yoo won the silver medal in W.A.K.O.

Yetbeop Taekkyon practitioners also competed and won in different combat sports and martial arts tournaments, such as Kickboxing and Muay Thai.

== Taekkyon and taekwondo ==
There is a common myth about Taekkyon being depicted as a kicking game as well as an "ancient version of taekwondo" in the public eye. This is mainly due to the spread of taekwondo as the national martial sport of Korea after the Korean War. Since then, taekkyon has been known to the general public mainly through association with taekwondo and rendition based on incomplete information via bits and pieces of records emphasizing its kicking techniques. Even though the taekwondo establishment claims an ancient lineage through taekkyon, and even partially modeled its name on it, the two disciplines don't have much in common and taekkyon associations explicitly deny any link.

== In popular culture ==
=== Comics ===
- The God of High School (갓 오브 하이 스쿨): weekly online manhwa published on Webtoon since 2011. Adapted into an anime by MAPPA in 2020. The character Park Il-Pyo and his cousins use this fighting style under the name of "Ssamsu Taekkyon".
- Bridal Mask (각시탈): manhwa published in 1974. Adapted into TV series in 2012. The main character Lee Kang-To and his older brother use Taekkyon against their Japanese oppressors.
- Lookism (외모지상주의): weekly action/drama manhwa published by Park Tae-jun on Webtoon since 2014. An anime adaptation was released by Studio Mir in December 2022 on Netflix. The series features an extensive cast of characters and their respective martial art(s). Street Fighters like Yoon Kyung-heon (Jason Yoon in the English translation) from the faction Big Deal, and the so-called "Kings of Incheon" Na Jae-gyeon, his rival Seon Yu-jae and Ha Yoo-gang are noted users of the style.
- QUESTISM (퀘스트지상주의): another manhwa by Park Tae-jun and part of the PTJ Universe. This weekly online manhwa has been published on Webtoon since 2021. The protagonist, Kim Su-hyeon, starts as a bullied geek before earning the System, a mysterious game-like interface that gives him quests to become stronger. In combat, the core of his fighting style, among other techniques, is "Yetbeop Taekgyeon," which he later masters in an advanced form known as "True Yetbeop Taekgyeon".

=== Movies ===
- Fighter in the Wind (바람 의 파이터): martial arts film released in 2004. Very loosely based on the life of Korean-born karateka Oyama Masutatsu (1923–1993), founder of the Kyokushinkai style. The film shows the young master practicing Taekkyon with his mentor and using it against a Japanese officer.
- The Showdown (거칠 마루) Geochilmaru: martial arts film released in 2005. Eight fighters of different styles met online on a martial arts site challenge each other to decide who will face the webmaster and urban legend, the mysterious Geochilmaru.
- The three Master Kims (김관장 대 김관장 대 관장): comedy released in 2007. The burlesque character of "Master Kim" played by actor Shin Hyun-joon turns out to be an expert in Taekkyon against gangsters terrorizing his district.

=== Television series ===
- Warrior: In episode 6 of the second season ("To a Man with a Hammer, Everything Looks Like a Nail"), a Korean fighter fights with Taekkyon.
- Undercover Miss Hong (언더커버 미쓰홍): In episode 15 (“No Mercy”), the father of Hong Keum-bo is a practitioner of Taekkyon.

== See also ==
- Korean martial arts
- Song Deok-gi
- Korean culture
- Chuojiao
- Tan Tui
