= List of taekwondo practitioners =

This is a list of notable practitioners of Taekwondo.

== Grandmasters ==
=== Choi Hong Hi and Original Twelve Masters of Taekwondo ===
- Choi Hong-hi (Chung Do Kwan → Oh Do Kwan → KTA → ITF) – Founder of International Taekwon-Do Federation. While contested, Choi is still regarded by many as the "Founder of Taekwon-Do".
- Nam Tae-hi (Chung Do Kwan → Oh Do Kwan → KTA → ITF → ATF) – was a pioneering South Korean master of taekwondo and is known as the "Father of Vietnamese Taekwondo". With Choi Hong-hi, he co-founded the "Oh Do Kwan" and led the twelve original masters of taekwondo of the Korea Taekwon-Do Association (KTA). He founded the American Taekwon-Do Federation (ATF) in Chicago, Illinois in 1969.
- Choi Chang-keun (ITF) – began his martial arts training in the South Korean army in 1956, studying taekwondo and karate. Choi taught taekwondo in Malaysia from 1964, and moved to Vancouver, Canada, in 1970. In 1973, he held the rank of 7th dan. Choi was promoted to 8th dan in 1981 by H. H. Choi, and attained the rank of 9th dan in 2002. He is still based in Vancouver.
- Choi Kwang-jo (other/Choi Kwang Do) – Following a career in the South Korean military, he emigrated to the United States in 1970. Choi is the founder and head of the Choi Kwang Do international martial art organization, with headquarters in Atlanta, Georgia, USA.
- Han Cha-kyo (Oh Do Kwan → ITF → UTF) – Following a career in the South Korean military, he emigrated to the United States in 1971 with his wife and newborn daughter. After teaching taekwondo for many years in Chicago, he died in 1996.
- Kim Jong-chan (ITF) – based in Vancouver, Canada.
- Kim Kwang-il (ITF) – contributed to the introduction of taekwondo into West Germany. He was head instructor of the ITF in West Germany, but was relieved of this duty in October 1971. In 1975, Kim was ranked 6th dan. He promoted Rolf Becking, head of the ITF Germany Technical Committee, to the rank of 2nd dan in 1976 in Stuttgart, West Germany. Between 1974 and 1977 Kim had a restaurant in Stuttgart and had completed training as a Brewmeister prior to 1974.
- Kong Young-il (ITF) – Following a career in the South Korean military, Kong emigrated to the United States just before or in 1968. He and his younger brother, Young-bo Kong, founded the Young Brothers Taekwondo Associates in 1968. Kong was promoted to the rank of 9th dan in 1997 by H. H. Choi in Poland. He is based in Las Vegas.
- Park Jong-soo (ITF) – In 1968, Park settled in Toronto, Canada. In 1973, he held the rank of 7th dan. Park and Choi went their separate ways after Choi insisted on establishing relations with North Korea during a politically sensitive period.
- Park Jung-tae (ITF → GTF) – Park moved to Toronto, Canada in 1970. During the 1970s, Park established the Manitoba Tae Kwon-Do Association. In 1975, he was ranked 6th dan. At the time, he was ranked 8th dan in the ITF and in November 1984, Park was elected Secretary-General of the ITF. He also held the position of Technical Chairman of the ITF. Park founded the Global Taekwondo Federation (GTF) on 14 June 1990, the year after his departure from the ITF due to North–South Korean political issues. He created six additional hyung to be practised along with the earlier ITF patterns. Amongst those who affiliated with the GTF was Sabree Salleh in 1998. Shortly before he died, Park promoted Salleh to 9th dan (GTF).
- Park Sun-jae alias S.J. Park (ITF → WT) – a pioneer of taekwondo in Italy. He introduced taekwondo to Italy around 1968. In 1968, he was ranked 5th dan, and in 1975, he was ranked 7th dan. He was elected vice-president (Italy) in the European Tae Kwon Do Union (within the World Taekwondo Federation) at the union's inaugural meeting in 1976. In 2002, he was a member of the arbitration board for the WT's World Cup Taekwondo championship in Tokyo. On 15 February 2004, the Executive Council of the WT elected him as Acting President of the WT following Un-yong Kim's resignation from the presidency of the organisation. He is Vice President (Italy) of the WT. Park was President of the Federazione Italiana Taekwondo (Italian Taekwondo Federation) around 1998, and still held the position as of 2008 and 2009.
- Chong-chul Rhee (KTA → Rhee Taekwondo) – South Korean master of taekwondo who arrived to Australia in the 1960s. He is the founder of Rhee Taekwon-Do, which is widely publicised as Australia's first and biggest taekwondo school. Rhee holds the title 'World Master' and the rank of 8th dan in taekwondo.
- Rhee Chong-hyup alias C.H Rhee (KTA → Rhee Taekwondo)– In the mid-1960s, he contributed to the introduction of taekwondo to Malaysia and Singapore. He arrived in Australia in 1970 and settled in Melbourne, Australia. Rhee is in charge of Rhee Taekwon-Do operations in Melbourne.
- Rhee Ki-ha (ITF) – widely recognised as the 'Father of British Taekwon-Do' for introducing the martial art to the United Kingdom since arriving in 1967. He is also considered the 'Father of Irish Taekwon-Do'.

=== Other Notable Grandmasters ===
- Sun-hwan Chung alias James Sun-hwan Chung (WT → Moo Sool Do) – one of the highest-ranking Tang Soo Do, Hapkido, and taekwondo grandmasters in the world. He is founder of the Moo Sool Do (Martial Arts United) form of martial arts and is president of the World Academy of Martial Arts, LLC.
- Yun Dukan (Moo Duk Kwan → Oh Do Kwan → KTA → ITF → United Martial Arts Association → ATF → United Tae Kwon Do Federation → D.A.Yun's TKD) ㅡ South Korean Taekwondo Pioneer and Grandmaster who, with the encouragement of Choi Hong Hi and Sang Kyu Shim, introduced Taekwon-Do to the United States of America in 1968 and founded the first Taekwon-Do school of Milwaukee, Wisconsin.
- Kim Ki-whang (WT)
- Sang-chul Lee (WT)
- Hong Sung-chon (WT, 9th Dan) – is an early proponent of Taekwondo in the Philippines. He is the vice-president of the Philippine Taekwondo Association.
- Sang-kee Paik (WT)
- Park Dong-keun (WT)
- Park Yeon-hwan (WT)
- Park Yong-soo (WT)
- Tae-hong Choi (WT)
- Brenda Sell (WT)
- Choi Jung-hwa (ITF)
- Robert Howard (martial artist) (ITF)
- Frank Massar (WT)
- Tran Trieu Quan (ITF)
- Nguyễn Văn Bình (judoka) (ITF)
- Haeng Ung Lee (ATA)
- Kwang Sung Hwang (ITF → KATU)
- Kyongwon Ahn (WT → UTA)
- Jhoon Rhee (Chung Do Kwan → ITF → Jhoon Rhee TKD) – South Korean master of taekwondo who is widely recognized as the 'Father of American Taekwondo' for introducing this martial art to the United States since arriving in the 1950s. He was ranked 10th dan.
- S. Henry Cho (other)
- Hee Il Cho (other)
- Kim Pyung-soo (other)
- Hwang Jang-Lee (other)
- Allen Steen (Chung Do Kwan)
- Skipper Mullins (Chung Do Kwan)

== Olympic medalists ==
All the practitioners listed in this section are part of World Taekwondo.

- Hadi Saei – Iranian councilor and former taekwondo athlete who became the most successful Iranian athlete in Olympic history and the most titled champion in this sport by winning 9 world class titles (three olympic titles in 2000 and 2004 and 2008, two world championships titles, four world cup titles and one world olympic qualification tournament).
- Yousef Karami
- Steven López
- Hwang Kyung-seon
- Chen Zhong
- Wu Jingyu
- Jade Jones, OBE – Welsh taekwondo athlete. She is the 2012 and 2016 Olympic gold medallist in the women's 57 kg category, and the 2019 World champion, 2016, 2018 and 2021 European champion and 2015 European Games champion at the same weight. In 2012, she won Britain's first taekwondo Olympic gold medal in this category. Jones was at the time the reigning Youth Olympic champion in the girls' 55 kg category, winning gold for Great Britain in 2010.
- Dana Hee - United States taekwondoin who competed in Women's Lightweight and won gold medal in the 1988 Seoul Olympics. She subsequently built a career as a stuntwoman, action film actress and model, among other things.
- María Espinoza
- Chu Mu-yen
- Servet Tazegül
- Cha Dong-min
- Joel González
- Alexandros Nikolaidis
- Huang Chih-hsiung
- Mauro Sarmiento
- Lee Dae-hoon
- Nur Tatar
- Pascal Gentil
- Rohullah Nikpai
- Milica Mandić
- Alexey Denisenko
- Maksim Khramtsov
- Vladislav Larin
- Beth Munro
- Jimmy Kim
- Lynnette Love - United States taekwondoin who competed in Women's Heavyweight (+70 kg) and won gold medal in the 1988 Seoul Olympics and a bronze medal in the 1992 Barcelona Olympics.
- Park Tae-joon - South Korean taekwondo athlete, participated in the 2024 Summer Olympics, where he won the gold medal in the men's flyweight (-58 kg) event.
- Ulugbek Rashitov - Uzbekistani taekwondo practitioner. He won the gold medal in the Men's 68 kg event at the 2020 and 2024 Summer Olympics.
- Panipak Wongpattanakit - Thai taekwondo athlete, who competed in women's Flyweight (49 kg). She won Gold in 2020 and 2024 Summer Olympics, as well as Bronze in 2016 Summer Olympics.

== Kickboxers and Mixed Martial Artists ==
- Anthony Pettis – is a 3rd dan black belt in Taekwondo
- Yair Rodríguez
- Anderson Silva - is a 5th dan black belt in Taekwondo
- Mirko Filipović (alias Cro Cop) - Filipović began formal training in taekwondo at the age of 7.
- Rose Namajunas
- Valentina Shevchenko
- Rick Roufus
- Bas Rutten
- Edson Barboza
- Benson Henderson
- Akop Stepanyan
- Nina Ansaroff
- Keiji Ozaki
- Jeff Smith - is a 9th dan blackbelt in Taekwondo under Jhoon Rhee and former seven-time PKA World Light Heavyweight Champion
- Yuta Kubo
- Dale Cook
- Uriah Hall
- Jung Chan-sung (alias The Korean Zombie) – started training in Taekwondo when he was in the South Korean Navy.
- Conor McGregor
- Dennis Siver
- Mayhem Miller
- Michael Page – Page describes his discipline as a "hands down kickboxing style" created from a "mishmash" of taekwondo, karate, and kung fu styles competing under a points scoring ruleset. Page was scouted by the Great Britain Taekwondo team to train and qualify for the Olympics but turned it down to pursue a professional combat sports career.
- Thanh Le - one time holder of ONE Featherweight World Championship. He has been training in Taekwondo since his infancy, as his father ran a Taekwondo Gym.
- Cung Le
- Ali Atienza - A Filipino former athlete turned newscaster and politician who became the second Filipino to win a gold medal in the Asian Taekwondo Games. He earned a fifth degree black belt in 2021
- Robelis Despaigne - is a 4th dan blackbelt in Olympic Taekwondo, Karate Combat Heavyweight Champion, and a professional mixed martial artist

== Celebrity practitioners ==
- Chuck Norris - while primarily known as Tang Soo Do practitioner, as well as having devised his own martial arts system, Norris was awarded 8th Dan Black Belt in Taekwondo in 1997 - being the first American to receive such honor.
- Michael Imperioli - American actor, writer, director and musician, best known for his role as Christopher Moltisanti in the HBO crime drama The Sopranos (1999–2007). He and his family are avid practitioners of Taekwondo.
- Jean-Claude Van Damme
- Sarah Michelle Gellar
- Jessica Alba
- Criss Angel
- Phil Mickelson
- Jackie Earle Haley
- D'Brickashaw Ferguson - former American football offensive tackle who played ten seasons for the New York Jets of the National Football League (NFL). He is a brown belt in taekwondo.
- Dave Mustaine - American musician. He is the co-founder, lead vocalist, rhythm guitarist and primary songwriter of the thrash metal band Megadeth. Mustaine holds a black belt in taekwondo and was made a Goodwill Ambassador of the World by the World Taekwondo Federation in 2007.
- Michael Jai White - American actor who has black belts in various martial arts, including Taekwondo.
- Joe Rogan - According to Black Belt Magazine, Rogan started competing in taekwondo tournaments at 15 and claimed his U.S. Open title four years later.
- Katheryn Winnick
- Sean Patrick Flanery
- Rick Yune
- Will Yun Lee
- Evan Rachel Wood
- Willie Nelson
- Patrick Swayze
- Ryan Phillippe
- Gackt
- Lorenzo Lamas
- Emmanuel Lewis
- Mackenzie Foy
- Noah Ringer
- Monsour del Rosario - Filipino actor, martial artist, producer, and politician who studied taekwondo under Hong Sung-chong, earning an eighth degree black belt. He competed in 1985 World Taekwondo Championships and 1986 Asian Games (both held in Seoul, South Korea), earning bronze medals each under lightweight division. He also earned both gold medals each in 14th and 15th Southeast Asian Games held in Jakarta, Indonesia and Kuala Lumpur, Malaysia respectively. He also competed in 1988 Seoul Summer Olympics, reacheing the quarterfinal round. He soon established his career as an actor (mainly in action movies) and politician. Additionally, he also practiced Tang Soo Do before switching to taekwondo.
- Jerry Trimble
- Young Kun Kim (alias Y.K Kim) – received a taekwondo black belt at age 13, making him among the youngest in Korea to do so. At first he studied and taught taekwondo in Korea. In 1976 he moved to Buenos Aires, Argentina and taught taekwondo there. In 1977 he moved to New York City. In 1978 he moved to Orlando, Florida and opened Y.K. Kim's TaeKwon-Do, his first taekwondo school. Known also for the 1987 cult movie Miami Connection, which Y.K Kim produced and starred in.
- Phillip Rhee - South Korean-American martial artist, actor, director, screenwriter, and film producer, most famous for his role in the Best of the Best movie series. While primarily known as a Hapkido practitioner, he also holds a black belt in Taekwondo.
- Simon Rhee
- Gary Daniels
- Scott Adkins
- Ke Huy Quan - American actor, martial artist and stunt choreographer who is known for portraying a Chinese kid named Short Round in Indiana Jones and the Temple of Doom (1984) in which he started learning Taekwondo on set for the role and continued to study that art afterwards under Chinese-South Korean actor-martial artist Tan Tao-liang, earning him a second-degree black belt.
- Dick Wei
- Donnie Yen - Hong Kong martial artist and actor. As the son of a Chinese martial artist, he primarily trained Kung Fu in his youth however learnt Taekwondo as well as other martial arts in his teenage years. He has achieved a 6th Dan Black Belt
- Adrian Paul
- Shannon Lee - American actress-martial artist who is the daughter and younger sister of the late actors-martial artist Bruce and Brandon Lee respectively. Primarily trained Jeet Kune Do, a martial arts developed by her father, she also studied taekwondo under Chinese-South Korean actor-martial artist Tan Tao-liang.
- Brenda Song
- Akshay Kumar - obtained a black belt in Taekwondo while in India.
- Farrhana Bhatt - Indian actress, martial artist and a peace activist. Bhatt is a national-level athlete who has represented her state and country in Taekwondo. Bhatt is also a five-time national medallist in the sport and holds a 2nd Dan Black Belt.
- Ariel Winter
- Tiger Shroff
- Nitu Chandra - Indian actress, model, film producer and martial artist who holds 2nd Dan Black Belt in Taekwondo and represented India in the 1997 World Taekwondo Championship in Hong Kong.
- Thomas Ian Griffith - American actor, producer, screenwriter, musician and martial artist known for his portrayal as Terry Silver in 1989 martial arts movie The Karate Kid III and Netflix martial arts series Cobra Kai (a sequel to The Karate Kid franchise), learned taekwondo in his teens, earning a black belt when he was 18.
- Sun Chien - Taiwanese actor and martial artist worked in Hong Kong known for his Taekwondo kicks (earning him a nickname "Korean Kicker" despite the fact being not a Korean) and his career as a member of Venom Mob, a group of actors-martial artists who starred in 1978 Shaw Brothers film Five Deadly Venoms, in which he plays as Gao Ji/the Scorpion, as well as other films from that studio both with and without Venom Mob.
- Dev Patel - a British actor known for Slumdog Millionaire and The Last Airbender, started to train in Taekwondo when he was a teenager and competed in both national and international championships, including the 2004 AIMAA (Action International Martial Arts Association) World Championships in Dublin, Ireland competing as a red belt fighting against red belt and other black belts in junior division, winning a bronze medal after losing to an Irish black belt named Niall Fitzmaurice in "a very close and tough fight" in the semifinals. Patel later earned a first degree black belt in 2006.
- Ho Chung Tao - Taiwanese Martial artist and retired actor famous from the Hong Kong Bruceplotiation era of martial arts movies.
- Rayna Vallandingham - American martial artist, actress and vlogger known for portraying Zara Malik, a skilled martial artist and a member of the Iron Dragons dojo in season 6 of Netflix martial arts series Cobra Kai in 2024, in her acting debut. A fourth degree black belt, she earns a 13-time world championship in Taekwondo, making her a youngest black belt to do so.
- Jimmy Liu Jing - Taiwanese actor best known for portraying Wu Tsu-wei in the Netflix series Light the Night (2021–2022) and internationally as Sun Wei-Chen the American Disney+ series American Born Chinese (2023) alongside Michelle Yeoh and Daniel Wu, studied taekwondo at the age of six and later earned his black belt. He also won in many local taekwondo competitions.
- Richard Yap - Filipino actor, singer and entrepreneur of Chinese descent, studied taekwondo and other martial arts prior to his acting career.
- Ben Wang - Chinese-American actor who is known for portraying Jin Wang in Disney+ series American Born Chinese, Bo in 2023 sports drama film Chang Can Dunk and the title character of Li Fong in 2025 martial arts movie Karate Kid Legends, studied various martial arts, including taekwondo.
- Asha Sharma - second-degree black belt

== Honorary Black belts ==
- Donald Trump (WT) – was presented with the honorary ninth-degree black belt by Lee Dong Seop, the president of the World Taekwondo Headquarters Kukkiwon, on November 22, 2021. Trump's youngest son, Barron Trump, is also a taekwondo black belt.
- Barack Obama – studied taekwondo from 2001 to 2005, when he served as a junior senator in Illinois. In 2009 Obama was awarded honorary black belt by then-South Korean President Lee Myung-Bak.
- Vladimir Putin (WT) – Was awarded 9th Degree Black Belt by World Taekwondo in 2013. World Taekwondo stripped Putin's Honorary belt after the instigation of the 2022 Russian invasion of Ukraine.
- Zlatan Ibrahimovic – was awarded an honorary black belt in 2010.
- Pope Francis – was awarded an honorary black belt in 2017
- Pope Leo XIV – was awarded an honorary 10th dan in 2026
