= List of taekwondo grandmasters =

List of everyone who has achieved the highest level in taekwondo

Many taekwondo grandmasters are natives of South Korea, the birthplace of the martial art

This list of taekwondo grandmasters includes notable persons who have been recognized as grandmasters of the Korean martial art of taekwondo. There is no single, universally-recognized set of criteria to define a taekwondo grandmaster; different organizations and different styles have their own rules. Those listed below are grouped by system: Kukkiwon (widely known as the World Taekwondo Headquarters), International Taekwon-Do Federation (ITF), and other systems (which includes some persons receiving ranks from taekwondo organizations that predate the other two systems, e.g., the original Korea Taekwondo Association (KTA)) and United Taekwondo Association UWTA. World Alliance Taekwon-do Federation GM Francesc Campanya

== Kukkiwon (World Taekwondo Headquarters) ==
This list includes persons who:

1. are ranked at least 8th -10th depending school dan by Kukkiwon (the highest rank normally awarded to living persons within that system);
2. are notable as individuals; and
3. are notable for their contribution to taekwondo.

Name	Rank	Life	Residence	Prominence	References
Lee, Moo Yong	10th dan	1938-2016	United States of America	Awarded the President’s Council on Fitness, Sports and Nutrition Lifetime Achievement Award in Washington, DC; Inducted into the USA Grandmasters Society Hall of Fame; Former President of the USTU.	
Hong Sung-chon	9th dan	1945–	Philippines	Kukkiwon Chairman of the Board (2016–). CEO and Chief Instructor of the Philippine Taekwondo Association (1975–)	
Ahn, Kyongwon	9th dan	1937–	United States of America	Founded United Taekwondo Association; former president of the United States Taekwondo Union	See main article
Choi, Tae-hong	9th dan	1935–2009	United States of America	Founded first taekwondo school in Oregon, United States; former vice-president of the United States Taekwondo Union	See main article
Chung, Sun-hwan	9th dan	1940–	United States of America	Founder of Moo Sool Do and President of World Academy of Martial Arts Association. Korean National Champion (1963–1965). Kukkiwon Advisory Council (2008). Hall of Fame - U.S. Taekwondo Grandmasters Society. Former President, U.S.T.U. Michigan Tae Kwon Do Association.	
Kim, Ki-whang	10th dan	1920–1993	United States of America	Promoted to 9th dan by the KTA, Chairman of the US Olympic Taekwondo team 1988, awarded 10th dan while in hospital with cancer in 1993. Inducted into Taekwondo Hall of Fame 2009.	See main article
Kim Pyung-soo	10th dan	1939–	United States of America	Promoted to 10th dan by Senior Grandmaster Hong Jong-Pyo, Taekwon Kwon Bop, in the Central YMCA, Seoul. Founded the Chayon-Ryu system of Taekwondo.	See main article
Samer Kamal	9th dan	1966–	Canada	President of the Arab Canadian Sports Association, 1988 Seoul Olympics medalist, 1st Class International referee since 1999, 1st Class Kukkiwon Examiner, the President of Champions Martial Arts Taekwondo in Canada and Jordan	www.SamerKamal.info
Chong, Jun	10th dan	1944–	United States of America	Founder of World United Martial Arts Organization, est 1973. His system combines Taekwondo and Hapkido.	
Min, Kyung-Ho (Dr. Ken Min)	9th dan	1935–	United States of America	Founder of the UC Martial Arts Program at UC Berkeley in 1969, which then hosted the first UC Open in 1970.	
Sell, Edward B	10th dan	1942–2014	United States of America	Highest ranked non-Asian Taekwondo black belt in the world. Only non-Korean honored at the Taekwondo Park in Seoul, Korea. Founder of the United States Chung Do Kwan Association.	
Paik, Sang-kee	9th dan	1929–2009	United States of America	Early student of B. I. Yoon and first Black Belt of Grand Master Ki Whang Kim; created Sa-Sang Kwan system. Inducted into Taekwondo Hall of Fame 2013	See main article
Park, Dong-keun	9th dan	c. 1941–	United States of America	Father of Thai taekwondo; Head Coach of US Olympic taekwondo team in 1988 and 1992	See main article
Park, Young-Ghil	10th dan	1941– 2024	Italy	One of Founders of Italian Taekwondo (three Park Brothers - Sun-jae Park, Young-Ghil Park, Chung-un Park); Honorary President of FITA - Italian Taekwondo Federation 2016 - 2024; Technical Director of WTF Poomsae Committee 2018	
Lee, Hyeon-kon	9th dan	c. 1947–	United States of America	Chairman of Board of Education of Kukkiwon; former Vice Chairman of Education of the WTF; author of taekwondo textbook. Became an M.D. in 2000.	
Cho, Byung-kon	9th dan	1947–	United States of America	Student of Grand Master Pong-ki Kim and Grand Master Kop-soo Kwon: Kukkiwon #05000166 - Issued: 2001-09-08; Founder: Wisconsin Governors Cup; Founder: Virginia Governors Cup; Author: Korean Culture, Tourism and Language; Author: Star Taekwon-Do Master's Course; Author: Martial Arts Dynamic Marketing and Management Seminar; Author: International Discipline in the Martial Arts Seminar; Author: A Health Revolution; Secretary General for Korean-American Foundation (KAF); Past President of the Virginia State Tae Kwon Do Association; Former Secretary General for US Taekwondo Martial Arts Commission; Former Flexibility Consultant for Green Bay Packers	TaeKwonDo Times Magazine Issue March 1991
Sell, Brenda Jean (Brenda Sell)	9th dan	January 1955–	Lakeland, Florida (USA)	Kukkiwon Certificate number: 05001899; first female to be awarded the World Taekwondo Federation certification for international level referee credentials; Highest ranked non-Asian Kukkiwon female in the world; President of the United States Chung Do Kwan Association	See Wikipedia page for all sources
Wyllie, Gregory	9th dan	c. 1955 –	Sydney, New South Wales (Australia)	Introduced Taekwondo into the New South Wales school system, initiated the All Schools tournament. He became a ninth dan in April 2016.	
Mario, Hung Wai Wing	9th dan		Port-Louis (Mauritius)	Introduced Taekwondo in Mauritius since the 1970s and was induced to the World Taekwondo Hall of fame.	
Sylvestre, Yan Too Sang	8th dan		Rose-Hill (Mauritius)	A competitive Grandmaster who participated in several local, regional and international competitions. At the peak of his competitive career, Grandmaster Sylvestre Yan Too Sang ranked 5th (Poomsae) at the World tournament held in 2012.	
Won, In Hui	9th dan		Oklahoma City, Oklahoma (USA)	President of the Hanmookwan, one of the original 9 kwans that helped shape modern Taekwondo. President of the Central US Taekwondo Association. District director of the Oklahoma State Taekwondo Association. Served as an instructor while in the Korean armed forces and trained the US armed forces in Korea.	https://www.worldhanmookwan.org/history/inhuiwon/

Hassan Iskandar	9th dan Kukkiwon	1962-	Sydney, New South Wales (Australia)	Awarded Medal of the Order of Australia (OAM) 2025 Awarded Australian Sports Medal (2000) Awarded Tasmanian Star of Sport Award (1986) Inducted into the Taekwondo Hall of Fame (2011) World World Taekwondo (WT) Executive Council member (2021–2025) President of Australian Taekwondo from 2017 to 2021. Chairman Taekwondo Australia 2010 Secretary General Australian Taekwondo	https://pinnaclemartialarts.com.au/

Jean Kfoury	9th dan	1965–	Adelaide South Australia (Australia)	Awarded Medal of the Order of Australia (OAM) 2026 President of Australian Taekwondo Inducted into the Taekwondo Hall of Fame 2013 Awarded international best selling Co -Author 2025 Elite Martial Artists World Wide Volume III Former Vice President Commonwealth Taekwondo Union (Oceania) Secretary General Australian Taekwondo 2017 to 2021	https://austkd.com.au/2026/05/enews/australian-taekwondo-celebrates-prestigious-honour-for-president-jean-kfoury-oam/

== International Taekwon-Do Federation (ITFs) ==
This list includes persons who:

1. are ranked 9th dan by the ITF (and thus officially recognised as 'Grand Masters' within that system);
2. are notable as individuals; and
3. are notable for their contribution to taekwondo.

Name	Rank	Life	Residence	Prominence	References
Kim, Jong-Chan	9th dan	1936-	Canada	Grandmaster Jong Chan Kim (JC Kim) was born in 1936.	
Choi, Chang-keun	9th dan	c. 1940–	Canada	Leading campaign to reunite the ITF; one of the KTA's 12 original masters	See main article
Choi, Hong-hi	9th dan	1918–2002	Canada	Played major role in establishing Taekwon-Do in 1955; Founder of International Taekwon-Do Federation-ITF in 1966, inaugural president of the KTA; co-led the KTA's 12 original masters	See main article
Choi, Jung-hwa	9th dan	1951-	Canada	President of one of the three ITF organisations; son of H. H. Choi	
Howard, Robert	9th dan	c. 1938–	Ireland	President of the Republic of Ireland Taekwon-Do Association; helped establish taekwondo in Ireland; first European man promoted to 9th dan	
Kong, Young-il	9th dan	1943–	United States of America	One of the few promoted to 9th dan by H. H. Choi; one of the KTA's 12 original masters	See main article
Nam, Tae Hi	9th dan	1929–2013	United States of America	Father of Vietnamese taekwondo; pivotal performance in martial arts demonstration 1954; co-led the KTA's 12 original masters	See main article
Nguyen, Van Binh	9th dan	1936–	United States of America	Chairman of ITF Masters Promotion Committee; President of ITF-USA; pioneer of taekwondo in Vietnam	
Park, Jong-soo	9th dan	1941–2021	Canada	One of the KTA's 12 original masters	See main article
Rhee, Ki-ha	9th dan	1938–	United Kingdom	Father of British and Irish taekwondo; one of the few promoted to 9th dan by H. H. Choi; one of the KTA's 12 original masters	See main article
Sereff, Charles	9th dan	1933–2022	United States of America	One of the few promoted to 9th dan by H. H. Choi; founded the United States Taekwon-Do Federation	
Trajtenberg, Pablo	9th dan	c. 1955–2022	Argentina	President of one of the three ITF organisations after T. Q. Tran's death in 2010	
Tran, Trieu Quan	9th dan	1952–2010	Canada	President of one of the three ITF organisations from 2003 to 2010	See main article
MacCallum, Thomas	9th dan	1942–2025	Scotland	Honourable Grand Master Thomas (Tom) MacCallum served for over two decades as the Secretary-General of the International Taekwon-Do Federation (ITF) in Vienna. He was a direct confidant of General Choi Hong Hi and became the first recipient of the title Honourable Grand Master (HGM).	
Campbell, Derek (TKD)	9th dan	1959–	Scotland	Grand Master Derek Campbell is a founding member of the UKTC (United Kingdom Taekwondo Centres) in 1993, alongside Grand Master Stephen Rooney and Grand Master Peter Harkess. He was promoted to Grand Master by the World ITF Taekwondo Council (WITC) in 2018.	
Peter Harkess	9th dan	1952-	Scotland	Grand Master Peter Harkess is a founding member of the UKTC (United Kingdom Taekwondo Centres) in 1993, alongside Grand Master Stephen Rooney and Grand Master Peter Harkess. He is president of the World ITF Taekwondo Council (WITC).	

== Other taekwondo systems ==
This list includes persons who:

1. have been widely recognized masters of taekwondo for at least 30 years;
2. are notable as individuals; and
3. are notable for their contribution to taekwondo.

Name	Rank	Life	Residence	Prominence	References
Cho, Hee-il	9th dan	1940-	United States of America	Founded Action International Martial Arts Association; wrote several taekwondo books	See main article
Cho, Sihak Henry	9th dan	1934–2012	United States of America	Pioneer of taekwondo in the United States of America; wrote several books; contributed karate article in World Book Encyclopedia (1976)	See main article
Choi, Kwang-jo	9th dan	1942–	United States of America	Founded Choi Kwang-Do; one of the KTA's 12 original masters	See main article
Han, Cha-kyo	9th dan	1934–1996	United States of America	One of the KTA's 12 original masters	See main article
Hwang, Kwang-sung	9th dan	c. 1942–	United States of America	One of the few promoted to 9th dan by H. H. Choi	
Hwang, Jang-lee	9th dan	1944–	Korea	Hwang took Taekwondo lessons from age 14 and achieved his 7th dan (rank) black belt.	See main article
Kim, Bok man	11th Dan founder Rank as Founder Of World Chun Kuhn Taekwon-Do Federation-WCTF. 10th Dan in Traditional Taekwon-Do, Founding Member of ITF	c. 1934–2021	USA	Kim Bok-man (Korean: 김복만; Hanja: 金福萬,[1]) (3 December 1934 – 14 August 2021), Father of South East Asia Taekwon-Do.	See main article
Kim, Il kwon	9th dan, honorary posthumous 10th dan	10 December 1941 – 25 February 2015	Korea, United States of America	Founder of Ja Be Ryu Tae Kwon Do, former president of the World Martial Arts Federation	
Kim, Pyung-soo	10th dan	1939–	United States of America	One of only two students that tested and promoted to 5th Dan at the first Korean Tae Soo Do Association exam in 1962. First correspondent from South Korea to Black Belt Magazine(1964–68). Founder of The International Chayon-Ryu Martial Arts Association. Author of three Taekwondo Books (Ohara Publications): Palgue 1-2-3 of Taekwondo Hyung, Palgue 4-5-6 of Taekwondo Hyung, Palgue 7-8 of Taekwondo Hyung, and one Taekwondo book published in Russia.	See main article
Lee, Haeng-ung	10th dan	20 July 1936 – 5 October 2000	United States of America	Founded American Taekwondo Association; first grandmaster of the ATA; author of The Way of Traditional Taekwondo	
Park, Jung-tae	9th dan	c. 1943–2002	Canada	One of the KTA's 12 original masters	See main article
Rhee, Chong-chul	9th dan	c. 1935–2023	Australia	Considered as the Father of Australian taekwondo; founded Rhee Taekwon-Do; one of the KTA's 12 original masters	See main article
Rhee, Jhoon-goo	10th dan	1932–2018	United States of America	Father of American taekwondo	
Vega, Orlando	9th dan International Taekwon-Do Federation	1952-	United States/Puerto Rico	He began learning Kempo Karate with Sensei Felix Vega from New York. He studied under Sensei Vega for two years.	
Yun Dukan	9th dan	1942-	United States of America	Taekwondo Pioneer and Taekwondo Grandmaster originally from the Moo Duk Kwan. Yun Dukan, with the encouragement of Choi Hong Hi, began instructing Taekwon-Do in the United States of America in 1968.	See main article
Kang, Suh Chong	10th dan	1929–2022	Korea/United States of America	An original & notable student of the Chung Do Kwan under founder Won Kuk Lee. Founded Kuk Mu Kwan, and was a central figure in the migration of Taekwondo to the West. Kang was inducted into the Taekwondo Hall of Fame.	See main article
Kang, Tae Sun	10th dan	c.1962-	Korea/United States of America	One of Suh Chong Kang's first students, established many Taekwondo schools and programs since the 1970s, has personally trained tens of thousands of students along with holding notable leadership roles within many Taekwondo organizations. Kang was inducted into the Taekwondo Hall of Fame.	See main article

== See also ==
- Original masters of taekwondo
