= Tae Kwon Do Life Magazine =

Sports magazine

Tae Kwon Do Life Magazine is a magazine devoted to the martial art of taekwondo, and is published in the United States of America. It was founded in 2016 by US Olympic Taekwondo coach and Grandmaster Yeon Hwan Park.

The magazine appears in print and digital in 144 countries around the world. It features stories, largely from the world of Taekwondo, and receives written contributions from the Kukkiwon, World Taekwondo Headquarters, USA Taekwondo, and World Taekwondo.

In 2019 the magazine added a weekly interview podcast hosted by Marc Zirogiannis, the author of The Suffering of Innocents, and the Chief Editor and contributor to Taekwondo Life's print magazine.

In December, 2020 Taekwondo Life joined the Bleav Sports Network. Bleav is part of the Black Label Ventures Group.
