= Taekwondo in the Philippines =

Korean martial arts form in Philippines

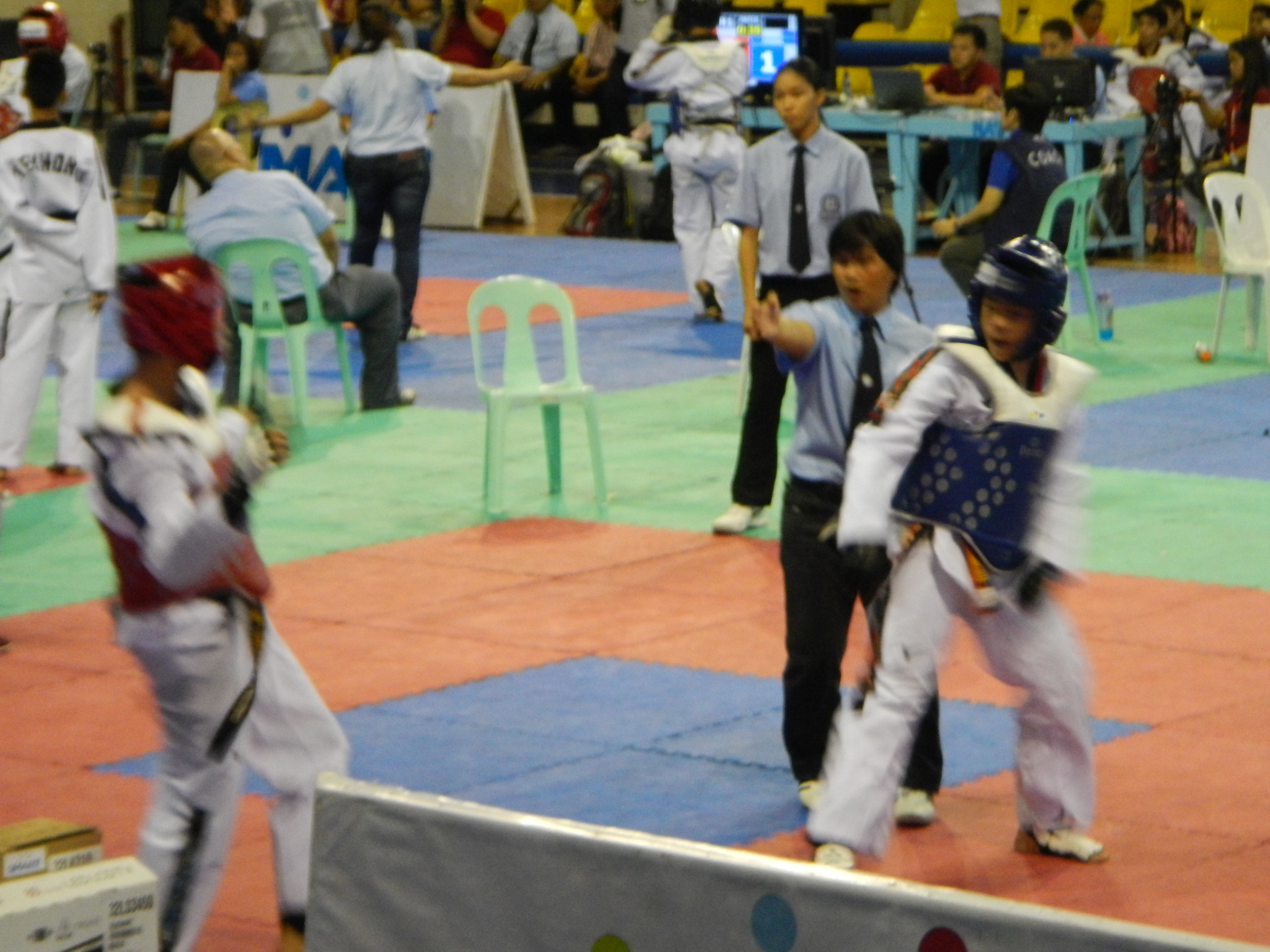
2013 SMART National Taekwondo Championships

Taekwondo was introduced to the Philippines through the efforts of Kim Bok Man and Young Man Park. Grand Master Kim Bok Man arrived in 1970 to continue Park's legacy of propagating Taekwondo upon the invitation of President Marcos. Kim continued to pioneer Taekwondo worldwide and left the Philippines in 1971. In 1975, Grand Master Hong Sung-chon came to the Philippines to promote Taekwondo, eventually establishing the Philippine Taekwondo Association (PTA). The current central headquarters of the PTA is at the Rizal Memorial Sports Complex. The PTA is a member of the Kukkiwon, World Taekwondo Federation, Philippine Sports Commission, Philippine Olympic Committee and Asian Taekwondo Union.

== Terminology ==
=== Kicks ===
In the Philippines, different names are used for the following kicks.

- Forty-five – a roundhouse kick to the torso
- Turning-side – pivoting on the front leg or ball of the foot and executing a back kick
- Full-moon – hook kick
- In-out – crescent kick, raising the leg diagonally across the body moving outwards
- Out-in – crescent kick, coming from the outside landing on the inside.
- Punch – front-leg side kick, cut kick, teep kick
- Stepping-side – taking a step and executing a side kick
- Bullet – rapid succession of alternate forty-five kicks
- Turning-long – tornado kick, dragon's whip kick, spin hook kick
- Jumping turning forty-five – forward jump twist then executing a forty-five in midair
- Jumping out-in
- Jumping axe kick
- Jumping turning out-in
- Jumping turning-long – jump spin hook kick
- Asian Turning Long – forward jump twist at the same time or slightly after, from the rear, executing a forty-five in midair or fake/feigning forty-five then turning long or spin kick

=== Color of belts ===
- Black belt (1st to 9th dan black belt)
- Brown belt (2nd grade and 1st grade brown) – Taeguk 7 and 8
- Red belt (4th grade and 3rd grade red) – Taeguk 5 and 6
- Blue belt (6th grade and 5th grade blue) – Taeguk 3 and 4
- Yellow belt (8th grade and 7th grade yellow) – Taeguk 1 and 2
- White belt – foundation form No. 1 and 2

== Notable taekwondo martial artists ==
- Paul Cabatingan – first batch member and organizer of Taekwondo Blackbelt Brotherhood (TBB)
- Elmer Pato – chair of Eljan Ventures Inc. (first professional manufacturer of taekwondo apparel in the Philippines); bronze medalist at 1976 Asian Championships in Melbourne, Australia
- Monsour del Rosario
- Jeff Tamayo – silver medalist in 1982; coach to Bea Lucero and Ali Atienza; military colonel
- Roberto "Kitoy" Cruz – three-time silver medalist at 1995, 1997 and 1999 World Taekwondo Championships, bronze medalist at 2001 World Taekwondo Championships, bronze medalist at World Cup Taekwondo Championships, gold medalist at 1999 2nd Asian Olympic Qualifying Tournament, two-time silver medalist at 1994, 1996 Asian Taekwondo Championships, six-time gold medalist at South East Asian Games
- Tshomlee Go
- Dante Pena
- Stephen Fernandez – bronze medalist of the 1992 Barcelona Olympics and current Deputy Secretary General of the Philippine Taekwondo Association
- Beatriz Lucero – representative to the Olympics in gymnastics
- Eva Marie M. Ditan – World Cup silver and bronze medalist
- John Paul "Japoy" Lizardo actor and Philippine representative
- Ali Atienza – The second Filipino to win a gold medal in the Asian Taekwondo Games and son of former mayor Lito Atienza
- Mary Antoinette Rivero
- Grace Poe Llamanzares – senator
- Jamby Madrigal – former senator
- Juan Ponce Enrile
- Kirstie Elaine Alora – taekwondo Olympics Representative

== See also ==
- NCAA Taekwondo Championship
- UAAP Taekwondo Championship
- Taekwondo at the 2005 Southeast Asian Games

== External sources ==
- Results of the Asian Taekwondo Championships
- Media related to Taekwondo in the Philippines at Wikimedia Commons
