= Ateneo bullying incident =

2018 school bullying incident in the Philippines

Ateneo de Manila Junior High School Student bullying incident
- Date: December 19, 2018; 7 years ago
- Venue: Ateneo de Manila Junior High School
- Location: Quezon City, Philippines
- Type: School bullying (through physical abuse)
- Participants: Joaquin Montes
- Outcome: Dismissal from school
- Injuries: 1

The Ateneo bullying incident occurred on December 19, 2018, when a student, Joaquin Montes, physically bullied a schoolmate inside the bathroom of the Junior High School campus in the Ateneo de Manila University. The incident was captured on video and was met with widespread shock and outrage on social media, with local celebrities, politicians, and netizens denouncing the incident. On December 23, the Ateneo management announced that the bully had been dismissed from the school.

== Incident ==
The video of the bullying incident, captured on camera, took place inside the bathroom of the Ateneo de Manila University, where the bully challenging a victim giving him a choice of "Bugbog o mawalan ng dignidad?" (lit. "Beatdown or lose your dignity?"). The bully then looked into the camera, explaining that if the student were to choose dignity, he would have to kneel and sniff the bully's shoes and "sensitive area". When the taller student, the victim, failed to reply, the smaller student, the bully, proceeded to attack the former using a style of taekwondo. The taller student never fought back, and his nose was later seen bleeding after the bully's attack ceased. It was at this point that the video ended.

Two other videos featuring the bully have also circulated on social media. In the second video featuring the same bully, a peer who was on his knees was being forced to say, "I'm dumb", while the third video showed the bully engaging in a fist-fight with another teenager. The former only stopped when the latter knelt.

The video made rounds on various social media platforms, prompting netizens to issue threats of violence against the bully whose identity was censored by mainstream news outlets.

== Aftermath ==
On December 21, the Department of Education (DepEd) issued a reminder that addresses "to both public and private Kindergarten, elementary, and secondary schools, it highlighted laws and regulations that schools must comply with to ensure robust anti-bullying policies." The Ateneo, as well as the Philippine Taekwondo Association, launched their own investigation. A children's rights organization, Save the Children Philippines, had urged the public not to share the video of the incident, as their privacy would be compromised. Ateneo de Manila University president Fr. Jose Ramon "Jett" Villarin said in the official statement that they already met both parties involved in the incident.

On December 22, the Commission on Human Rights (CHR) had reminded the public to protect the privacy of their children amid the video of the incident. An angry father who identified himself as Joseph Perez Otazu, a Fil-Canadian, posted a video on Facebook, angry at the incident, and challenged the father of the bully to fight him; Otazu will give P100,000 should he lose.

On December 23, Villarin announced that the bully has been dismissed, stating "he is no longer allowed to come back to the Ateneo". Several senators, including Richard Gordon and JV Ejercito, supported the decision of dismissing the student. After the incident video surfaced, several netizens speculated that the bully's father was a "high-ranking and influential official of the Philippine National Police", however, the police denied the rumors.

On December 24, the Philippine Taekwondo Association issued a statement via Facebook, recommending "an indefinite ban of the student involved from all sanctioned events not limited to Taekwondo-related events..."

On December 31, human rights lawyer and advocate Rene Saguisag, through the opinion column published by the Philippine Daily Inquirer, said that Ateneo should have waited for the holidays to be over before dismissing the student, also criticizing President Rodrigo Duterte for his silence on the issue.

On January 8, 2019, a witness of the incident claimed that the bully was "provoked" by other students. A witness also added that "he had his run-ins with the victim back in seventh grade".

On January 10, the mother of the bully spoke about the incident, claiming that "he acted in self-defense". However, local celebrities have expressed their disappointment, over the "lack of sincerity in the mother and son's apology".

== Reactions ==
After the incident, Ateneo Junior High School issued a statement, "On December 19, 2018, video that appears to feature Ateneo de Manila Junior High School students in a fight in the campus, has been making the rounds of social media." On December 21, several Senators urged netizens to stop attacking the teen who was in the video, and decried the incident. On December 20, the Presidential Spokesperson, Salvador Panelo, was "bothered" by the incident after he watched the video of the bully "using martial arts to hurt others". The PTA issued a statement, condemning "any form of misbehavior which includes harassment, bullying, and acts of violence".

Local celebrities also expressed their opinions about the incident, including Lea Salonga, Xian Lim, Robi Domingo, Kyla, and Tippy Dos Santos. Makati Representative and taekwondo champion Monsour del Rosario posted a statement on Facebook, denouncing the bully's behavior and lack of discipline, stating that the perpetrator was a "failed representation" of the sport. Local netizens similarly condemned the incident, expressing outrage at Ateneo apparently tolerating the bully and demanded immediate action, making the #NeverTolerateBullying hashtag a trending topic on Twitter.

On December 22, Senator Leila de Lima expressed her concern over the student in the bullying incident, saying that such forms of child abuse should be investigated. Boying Pimentel published his opinion on Philippine Daily Inquirer, supporting the bullied boy.

In the wake of the incident, songs about bullying have experienced a resurgence in popularity on social media, including "Katulad Ng Iba", performed by Gloc-9 and Zia Quizon, and "Anting-Anting" by Gloc-9, featuring Sponge Cola.

== Hoaxes regarding the incident ==
A home address claiming to be where the bully lives were fraudulently posted on social media. The purported address later turned out to be the Peacemakers Christian Family Church, owned by Pastor Rully Taculod and his wife. Taculod and his family and congregation then became the subject of prank deliveries from fast food chains and online stores as well as death threats from irate netizens who fell for the hoax. This led to the church putting up posters condemning the incidents and advising people that they are in no way associated with the bully and the address in the report is incorrect.

Other hoaxes such as Senator Risa Hontiveros purporting to have said that the bully was just "practicing taekwondo", and "Igalang naman po natin ang mga Atenista. Naglalaro lang naman ng sparring ang mga bata! Wala pong pang bu-bully nagaganap sa Ateneo" ("Let us respect the Atenista. The children were only play sparring! Bullying does not take place in Ateneo.") have been debunked by both Rappler and Hontiveros herself as fake news.
