= Yun Dukan =

South Korean taekwondo practitioner

Yun Duk An
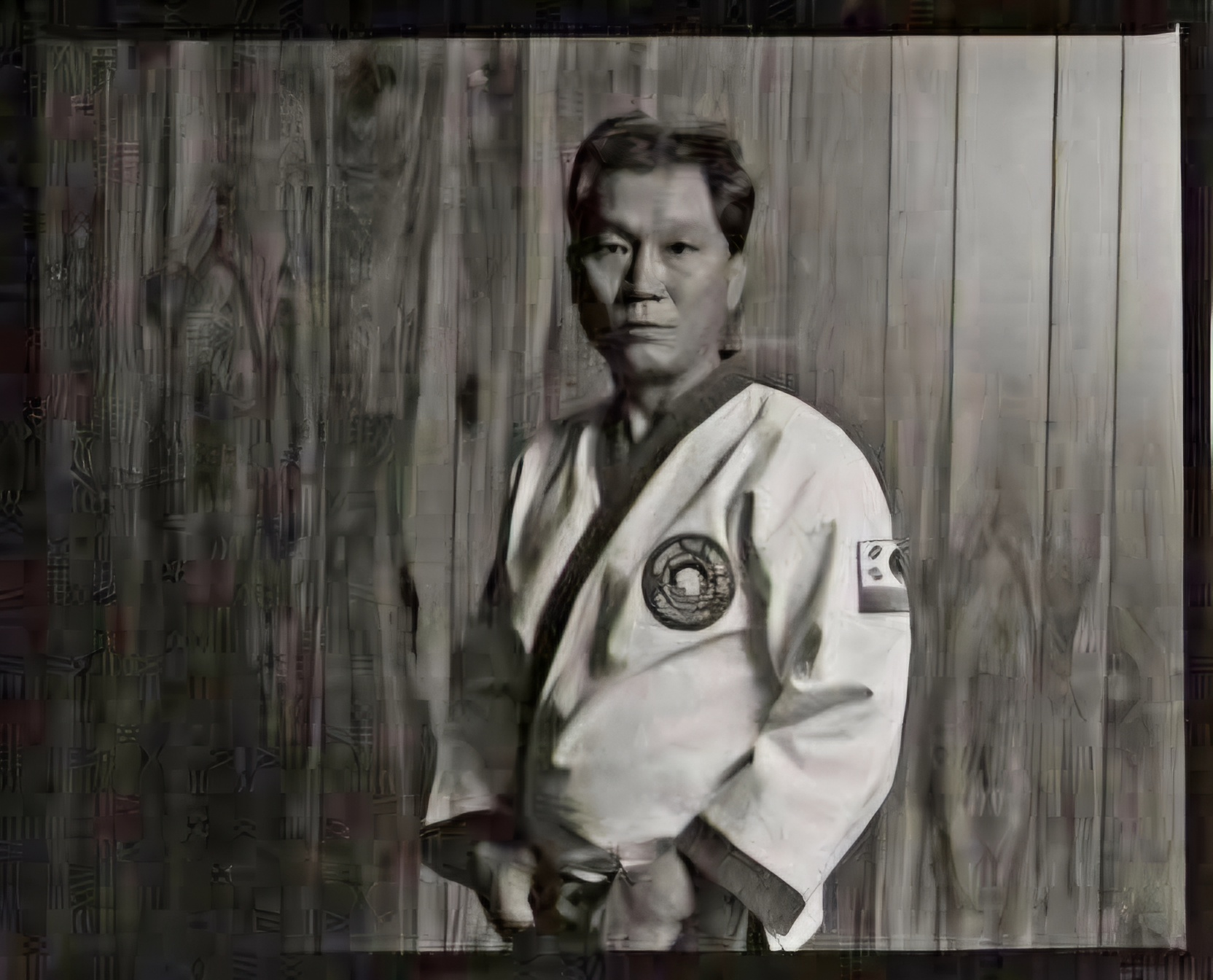
- Born: 17 October 1942 (age 84); Mokpo, Jeolla Province, Republic of Korea
- Style: D.A.Yun's Tae Kwon Do
- Rank: 9th dan Taekwon-Do, 1st dan Judo, 4th dan Tang Soo Do Moo Duk Kwan

Other information
Notable clubs
D.A.Yun's Black Belt Academy
United Tae Kwon Do Federation, Inc. D.A.Yun's Tae Kwon Do of Racine, WI
In this Korean name, the family name is Yun.
- Yun Dukan
- Hangul: 윤덕안
- Hanja: 尹德安
- RR: Yun Deokan
- MR: Yun Tŏgan

Yun Dukan, known as "Grandmaster D.A.Yun" (Korean: 윤덕안; born 17 October 1942), is an early South Korean taekwondo pioneer and Grandmaster. Yun is one of the early taekwondo instructors, a contemporary of Grandmasters Nam Tae Hi, Sang Kyu Shim, Jung Won Sun, Chang Gedo and Kim Il Woong. Yun brought his style of Taekwon-Do to the United States of America in 1968. Yun is featured in Gen. Choi Hong Hi's First Edition 1972 textbook Taekwon-Do (The Korean Art of Self-Defence): A Text Book for Beginning & Advanced Students. He was awarded the International Taekwon-Do Federation (ITF) Official Recognition Plaque No. 56 and has also been featured in the 2024 book The TaeKwon-Do Pioneers, Tae Kwon Do Times, Black Belt (magazine) and Tae Kwon Do & Korean Martial Arts Magazine.

== Biography ==
Yun was raised in what is now known as South Korea. He is a survivor of both the Japanese occupation of Korea and the Korean War. His early education included training in Hwang Kee's martial art of Tang Soo Do Moo Duk Kwan under the tutelage of Oh Sae Joon. Subsequently, he twice won the Tang Soo National Championships of Korea thus gaining the attention of Sang Kyu Shim. Shim asked Yun to assist with the teaching of the 1st and 2nd battalions of the Republic of Korea Marines; Yun would also teach the 1st Cavalry Division of the United States Army in Munsan, Korea. It was during this period that Shim introduced Yun to the South Korean General Choi Hong Hi. From Choi, Yun would learn Taekwon-Do along with Cha Soo Young, Moon Ku Baek, and Jung Joong Sun.

Yun later joined the Oh Do Kwan in Seoul, where he trained with E Jhoon Chang. There Yun began to learn and instruct in the International Taekwon-Do Federation (ITF) style of taekwondo. In 1968, Yun, with the encouragement of both Choi and Shim, came to Manitowoc, Wisconsin and began teaching taekwondo at the Manitowoc YMCA as part of the ITF's effort to bring the martial art to the Americas. In 1970, Yun moved to Milwaukee, Wisconsin and established the very first Tae Kwon Do school in the city. In 1971 Yun's school was visited by Choi Hong Hi and Nam Tae Hi where they taught at one of the first seminars they were to host.

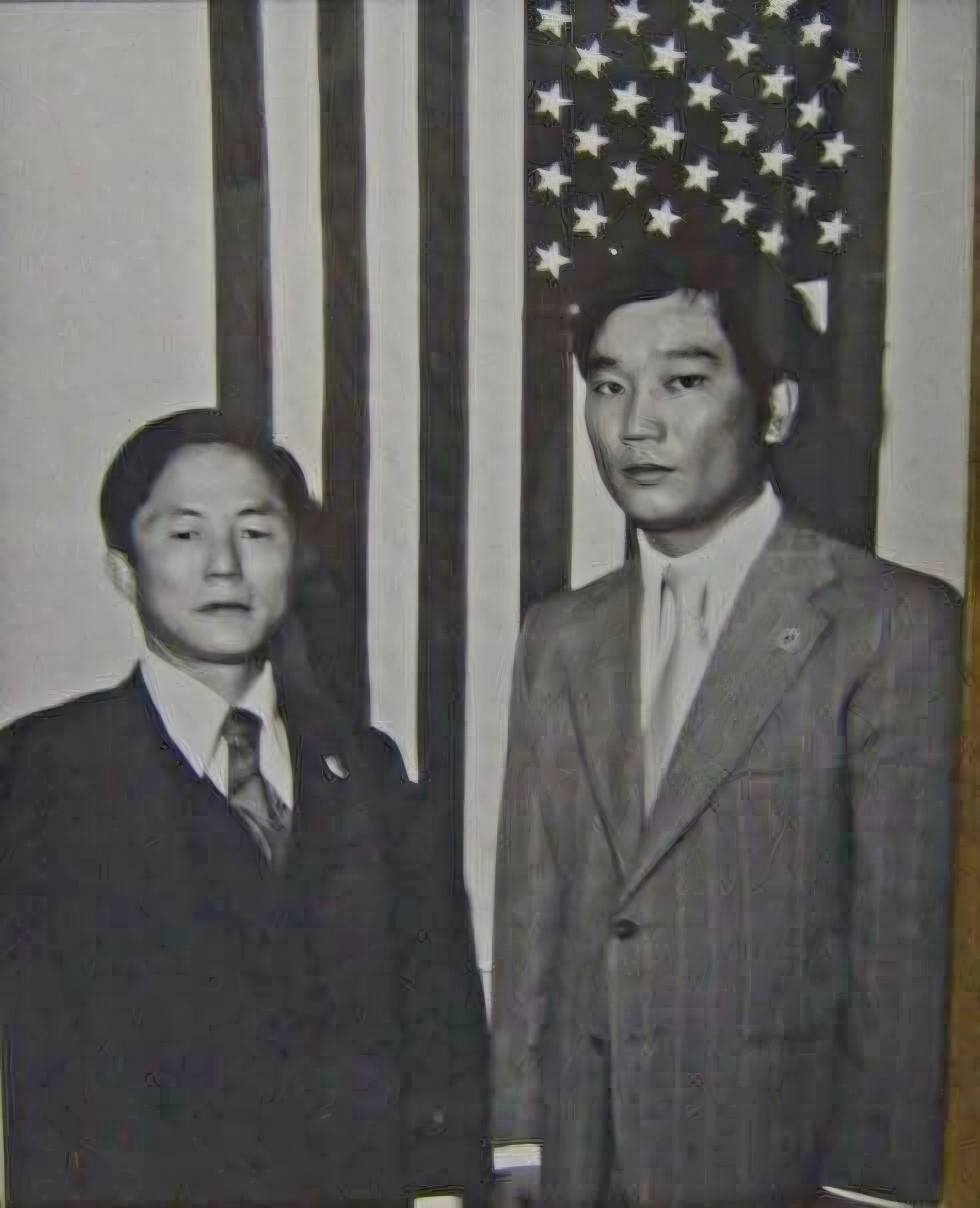
Choi Hong Hi with Yun Dukan

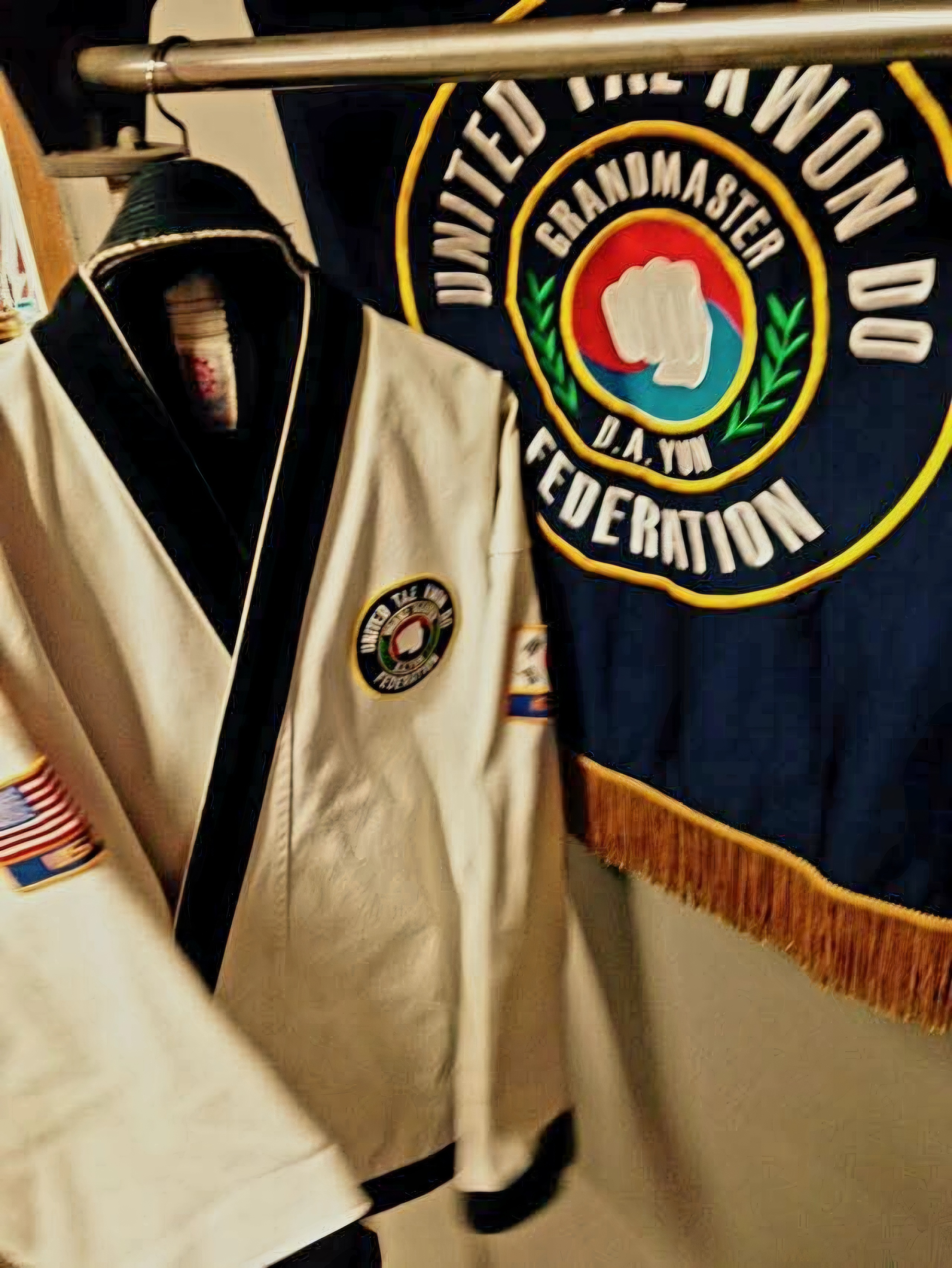
Yun's Academy Dobok and Patch

== Related External links ==
- Yun's Tae Kwon Do Racine Webpage
- Grandmaster D.A.Yun flickr Photos
- Yun's Black Belt Academy - United Tae Kwon Do Federation Milwaukee, WI USA Facebook Page
- United Tae Kwon Do of Racine, WI USA Facebook Page
