= Edward Sell =

Edward Sell may refer to:

- Edward Sell (priest) (1839–1932), Anglican orientalist, writer and missionary in India
- W. Edward Sell (1923–2004), Dean of the University of Pittsburgh School of Law
- Edward B. Sell (1942–2014), founder of the United States Chung Do Kwan Association
