= Elmer Pato =

Filipino taekwondo practitioner and sports executive (died 2020)

Personal information
- Nationality: Filipino
- Died: July 16, 2020 (aged 66)
- Occupation: Architect

Sport
- Country: Philippines
- Sport: Taekwondo
- Event: +80kg
Medal record
Representing Philippines
Men's taekwondo
Asian Championship
Bronze medal – third place	1976 Melbourne	80 kg

Elmer Pato (died July 16, 2020) was a Filipino taekwondo practitioner and sports executive who represented the Philippines in international competitions.

== Background ==
Pato is a recognized pioneer of the Philippine Taekwondo Association, having served as chairman for the national sports association's regional affairs. Pato competed at the 1976 Asian Championships in Melbourne, Australia where he clinched a bronze medal. He also served as an instructor and coach when Taekwondo was in its infancy in the country.

== Personal life ==
Pato is survived by his wife Maria Janela Pato, seven daughters and three sons. He was an architect by profession. Pato died due to COVID-19, amidst the COVID-19 pandemic, on July 16, 2020, at the age of 66.

== Honors ==
- 1976 Asian Taekwondo Championships (+80 kg; Bronze)
