= Kyongwon Ahn =

South Korean taekwondo master (born 1937)

- Born: 1937 (age 88–89); Seoul, Korea
- Occupation: Taekwondo master
- Known for: Founder of the United Taekwondo Association

Korean name
- Hangul: 안경원
- RR: An Gyeongwon
- MR: An Kyŏngwŏn

Kyongwon Ahn, 9th dan (Kukkiwon), is a South Korean taekwondo master who founded the United Taekwondo Association (UTA) in the United States.

Ahn was born in 1937 in Keijō, Keiki-dō, Korea, Empire of Japan, and began training in the martial arts began when he was 12 years old. He served an internship with his instructor, Chang Bok Lee, as the Master Instructor for the South Korean and American armies from 1955 to 1967. In 1962, Ahn achieved his Juris Doctor (Civil Law) from Kangwon University. In August 1967, he emigrated to the US and began teaching tang soo do at the University of Cincinnati in Ohio. He has also held teaching and advisory positions at the Miami University (in Ohio) and Xavier University. Ahn founded the International Martial Arts Federation, now the United Taekwondo Association in 1971 in an effort to standardize taekwondo teaching methods.

== Information ==
In 1974, Ahn was a founding member of the Amateur Athletic Union's Taekwondo Committee. The World Taekwondo Federation (WTF) awarded Ahn his Master Instructor certification in 1977. He received 9th dan ranking from Kukkiwon in 1990. Through the 1980s, Ahn worked within the United States Taekwondo Union (USTU) and ultimately served as the association president USA Taekwondo. He served as a member of the board of directors for the United States Olympic Committee and worked to bring taekwondo to the 1988 and 1992 Summer Olympic Games. In 2000, Ahn was one of the founders of the United States Taekwondo Won (USTW). From 2003 to 2005, he served on the WTF's Legislative Committee. In 2005, South Korea awarded Ahn the National Sport Merit Award in recognition of his work in promoting taekwondo and helping it to become a full medal Olympic sport.

== Major Taekwondo career accomplishments ==
- 1967 – Arrived in Cincinnati, OH to establish the martial arts program at the University of Cincinnati and to provide instruction to the R.O.T.C. students
- 1974 – Founding member of the National AAU Committee
- 1975 to 1979 – President of the Ohio Taekwondo Association
- 1977 – Head of the U.S. National Team at the 3rd World Championships held in Chicago, IL
- 1978 – Author of the promotion standards and code of operation for the National AAU Taekwondo Committee
- 1980 to 1984 – Vice President of the United States Taekwondo Union
- 1985 to 1986 – President-elect of the United States Taekwondo Union
- 1986 – Director of the 1st World Cup Taekwondo event held in Colorado Springs, CO
- 1986 to 1992 – President of the United States Taekwondo Union
- 1987 to 1992 – Executive Board Council member of the World Taekwondo Federation
- 1986 to 1992 – Member of the Board of Directors of the United States Olympic Committee
- 1988 – Team Leader for the U.S. National Team at the 1st Taekwondo Demonstration at the Olympic Games in Seoul, South Korea
- 1989 to 1992 – Chairman of the Law & Legislation Committee of the World Taekwondo Federation
- 1990 – Certified as an International Referee by the World Taekwondo Federation
- 1990 – Promoted to 9th Dan by the World Taekwondo Federation / Kukkiwon
- 1992 – Team Leader for the U.S. National Team at the 2nd Taekwondo Demonstration at the Olympic Games in Barcelona, Spain
- 1992 – Member of the Promotion Committee for the Taekwondo Olympic status
- 1992 – Member of the Arbitration Committee for the 1992 Barcelona Taekwondo Olympic Games
- 1995 – President of the Ohio State Taekwondo Association
- 1999 – Founding member of the United States Taekwondo Won
- 2001 to 2004 – President of the United States Taekwondo Won
- 2008–2009 – Member of the Kukkiwon International Advisory Committee

== Awards ==
- 1977 – Award from Dr. Un Yong Kim for Outstanding Contribution to Taekwondo
- 1987 – Award from Pan American Games
- 1992 – Award from the Barcelona Olympic Games
- 1995 – Award from Dr. Un Yong Kim for Outstanding Contribution to Taekwondo
- 2002 – National Martial Artist of the Year from the International Tang Soo Do Federation
- 2003 – National Sport Merit Award from the Republic of Korea

== Achievements ==
- One of the founding members of the AAU Taekwondo program
- Responsible for establishing the United States Taekwondo Union as the National Governing Body for Olympic Taekwondo
- Lobbyist for Taekwondo as an Olympic Sport
- Initiator for the World Cup Taekwondo event when President of the United States Taekwondo Union
- Founding member of the United States Taekwondo Won
- Has taught Taekwondo from 1957 through 2011 (1957 to 1967 in Korea; 1967 to current in the United States)

== Senior students ==
As an instructor, Ahn has taught and promoted thousands of students below black belt rank, hundreds of black belts and several master instructors, and six Grandmaster Instructors: Grandmaster August K. Oneal, Grandmaster Kim Limes, Grandmaster Ron Hickey, Grandmaster James Beasley, Grandmaster Robert K. Fujimura (former executive director of the US Taekwondo Union/now USA Taekwondo), and Grandmaster Chuck Beyersdoerfer. These masters and students became as Taekwondo instructors, international referees, state and national champions, and business leaders in many fields. He also sponsored other Korean instructors when they first came to the United States of America.

== See also ==
- List of taekwondo grandmasters
