= Park Dong-keun =

South Korean taekwondo practitioner

- Born: c. 1941; Jeollado, Korea
- Other names: D. K. Park
- Style: Taekwondo
- Team: South Korean National Team
- Rank: 9th dan taekwondo
- Years active: 1959–1966

Other information
- Website: http://dkparktkd.com/

Park Dong-keun (Korean: 박동근; born c. 1941), also known as D. K. Park, is a South Korean Grandmaster of taekwondo. He holds the title "Grandmaster," the rank of 9th dan in taekwondo, and was Korea's only undefeated taekwondo fighter in more than 200 International championship competition. Park introduced the martial art of taekwondo to Thailand in 1966, before settling in the United States of America, and was the taekwondo coach of both the US National Team and the US Olympic Team.

== Early life and career in Asia ==
Park was born in Jeollado, Korea, during World War II. He was a member of the South Korean National Team from 1959 to 1966, and served as team captain from 1964 to 1966. He was the South Korean National Champion from 1962 to 1966. After his retirement, he was inducted into the Korean Amateur Athletic Association's Hall of Fame as the only undefeated taekwondo champion from more than 200 International matches.

Park moved to Thailand in 1966 at the personal request of King Bhumibol of Thailand to teach taekwondo to the Thai royal family and US military forces, specifically US Army Security Agency units in Bangkok (83rd ASA Special Operations Unit,) and in Ban Non Song (7th ASA Field Station.)

== Career in North America ==
Park initially moved to Louisville, Kentucky, USA, in 1970. He then moved to Jersey City, New Jersey and on September 1, 1971, founded the D. K. Park Tae Kwon Do School (also the birthdate of his daughter, Jane). Later that year, he appeared on television on The Tonight Show Starring Johnny Carson. Park established the taekwondo program at New York University in 1973. In 1975, he became the first instructor to have two students (Gerard Robbins and Dennis Robinson) win official USA National Taekwondo Championships titles, and both of them competed in the 2nd World Taekwondo Championships in Seoul, South Korea. Park was the head coach for the US National Team in 1979 at the 4th World Championships in Stuttgart, Germany. In 1982, he was named Coach of the Year by the Amateur Athletic Union.

From 1982 to 1996, Park served as Coaching Committee Chairman of the United States Tae Kwon Do Union. He was the technical coach for the US Olympic taekwondo team at the 1988 Summer Olympics in Seoul. This was taekwondo's inaugural appearance at the Olympic Games as a demonstration sport. Park became head coach for the US Olympic taekwondo team at the 1992 Summer Olympics in Barcelona. In 1993, he was head coach for the US Team at the World Championships (1 gold, 2 silver, 3 bronze), and in 1994 at the Goodwill Games in Saint Petersburg, Russia, resulting again in 1 gold, 2 silver and 3 bronze medals.

== Later life ==
In 1997, Tae Kwon Do Times magazine named Park as its Man of the Year. In 2006, his first book was published: Tae Kwon Do basics, techniques and forms: The indomitable martial art of Korea (co-authored with Allan Schein). He was inducted into the US Taekwondo Grandmasters Society Hall of Fame in 2006 as coach of the year. On 6 April 2007, he was inducted into the Taekwondo Hall of Fame. He is a Life Member of USA Taekwondo. Park continues teaching taekwondo at his school in Jersey City, New Jersey.

== See also ==
- List of taekwondo grandmasters
- United States at the Olympics
