= Park Yeon-hwan =

South Korean Taekwondo Grandmaster

Park Yeon-Hwan
- Born: 1952 (age 73–74); South Korea
- Style: Taekwondo
- Rank: 9th dan taekwondo

- Korean name
- Hangul: 박연환
- RR: Bak Yeonhwan
- MR: Pak Yŏnhwan

Park Yeon-Hwan (Korean: 박연환; born June 29, 1952) is a South Korean Grandmaster of Taekwondo. He currently has earned a ninth-degree black belt and holds the title kwan jang-nim (Grandmaster) under the direction of the Kukkiwon. Park was the undefeated Korean national champion of Tae Kwon Do from 1971 to 1975 and the former coach of the U.S. Olympic and Pan-American Tae Kwon Do team.

Park trained in his native Korea from early childhood. He attended Korea University and served in the Republic of Korea Marine Corps before being dispatched by the South Korean government as an emissary to Africa, where he began teaching taekwondo in Lesotho. In 1980 he settled in the United States, where he established himself as a prominent figure in taekwondo instruction. While worldwide study of the martial arts increased in popularity in the early 1970s, due in part to work of Bruce Lee, taekwondo was still largely unknown outside of Korea. In 1983 Park established the goal of increasing the popularity of the sport in a concerted movement towards having taekwondo become recognized as an official Olympic Sport. In response to the work of Park and other taekwondo leaders the International Olympic Committee granted the sport Demonstration Sport status in the 1988 and 1992 games and as a full medal sport, commencing with the 2000 games in Sydney, Australia.

He has also served as president of the New York State Tae Kwon Do Association and in 1993 he became the secretary-general of the United States Tae Kwon Do Union. He is the former vice president of the United States Tae Kwon Do Union and the publisher of USA Taekwondo Review. In 2013 he was elected to the presidency of the Korea Youth Promotion Association of the USA, a non-profit organization sponsoring student exchanges with the South Korea, Japan and The United States. Park has been an adjunct professor of Taekwondo at Long island University and at the University of Bridgeport, lecturer and has coauthored Black Belt Tae Kwon Do and Tae Kwon Do, Third Edition, both for Checkmark Books, as well as 12 other books on the martial art. His latest book, Tae Kwon Do, My Life and Philosophy was published in 2009.

A major influence in the spread of Tae Kwon Do throughout the United States, Park has been featured in the "New York Times" and "Newsday", on the cover of nearly every major martial arts magazine and on major television networks. In 2008 he was elected President of the United States TKD Union. In 2010 Park was named Coach of the Year by the United States Taekwondo Grandmaster's Society.

Park currently teaches about fifteen classes a week, from beginner to black belt competition training in his Dojang, or training center, in Levittown, NY, which is one of a series of Tae Kwon Do learning academies opened under the YH Park name, in the United States since 1983, and is currently under the direction of his eldest son and fifth degree black belt, Edward Park. Park is also an advisor to the United States Taekwondo Education Foundation, a non profit organization whose mission statement is to spread Tae Kwon Do philosophies to public schools.

The January 2014 issue of Tae Kwon Do Times Magazine featured Grandmaster Park and his sons, Edward and Elliott, in an article about the changing demographics of leadership in the United States Taekwondo community from its Korean School founders, which were largely Korean immigrants, to their children, who are largely first generation Americans.

In 2014 Park was named a USA Taekwondo Regional membership Director.

In January 2016 Park was named President of the Board of Tae Kwon Do Life Magazine, an international print and digital publication.

In August, 2019 Grandmaster Park was awarded a 10th Dan Certificate from the Cheonjiwon World All Martial Arts Federation in Korea.

The May 2021 issue of Hoonlyun Magazine featured Grandmaster Park on the cover. This is the official journal of the United States Taekwondo Association.

On August 19, 2022 Grandmaster Park was inducted into the Taekwondo Hall of Fame for his lifetime contributions to the development of Taekwondo.
