= Edward B. Sell =

American taekwondo practitioner

- Born: July 17, 1942
- Died: February 5, 2014 (aged 71)
- Nationality: American
- Style: Chung Do Kwan Taekwondo
- Teachers: Grandmaster Park, Hae Man
- Rank: 10th degree black belt in Taekwondo

Other information
- Website: http://uscdka.com/

Edward B. Sell (July 17, 1942 - February 5, 2014) was an American martial arts instructor, and the highest ranking non-Korean practitioner of tae kwon do, holding the honorary rank of 10th degree black belt in the art. Sell founded the U.S. Chung Do Kwan Association.

== Biography ==
Sell was the founder of the United States Chung Do Kwan Association (USCDKA) and the only non-Asian person to be recognized by the World Taekwondo Federation as a 9th Dan Black Belt in the Chung Do Kwan school of Taekwondo, making him the highest ranked non-Asian Tae Kwon Do practitioner in the world. Grandmaster Sell was a member of the United States Air Force from 1959 to 1967. For much of this time, he was stationed at Osan Air Base in Korea, where he began to study Tae Kwon Do. In 1963, he was the first American to compete in the 1st Taekwondo National Championship, Seoul, Korea. In 1973, he was certified as an International Referee at the 1st International Referee Course held at the Kukkiwon. Sell was also on the original committee accepting the World Taekwondo Federation and the Kukkiwon. He was a USA Team Coach (1973), and on the WTF Technical Committee (1975). On August 18, 1967 he formed the U.S. Chung Do Kwan Association. In 1969 he published America's first Tae Kwon Do training manual, Forces of Tae Kwon Do, and he has been featured on the cover of the Tae Kwon Do Times twice, in September 1988 and June 1997. In the fall of 2011 Sr. Grandmaster Sell was declared as an "American Living Legend" by the South Korean government and will be included in the Taekwondo Park, Seoul, South Korea.

Sell died on February 5, 2014. He was surrounded by his family and wife at his home in Lakeland, Florida.

== United States Chung Do Kwan Association ==
In 1967 Sell began the "Korea Tae Kwon Do Association of America" in Trenton, Michigan. In 1974, he renamed his organization the "United States Chung Do Kwan Association" and relocated it to Lakeland, Florida. Its current president is Sell's wife, Brenda J. Sell, a 9th Dan Black Belt and the only recognized female American Tae Kwon Do Grandmaster. The USCDKA derives its roots from the World Chung Do Kwan Association and World Taekwondo Federation (WTF). It currently contains nearly 250,000 members and over 4,000 black belts, and is considered one of the oldest Taekwondo organizations in the United States.

The USCDKA is known for its development of the Instructor's Degree System. Degrees of black belts, or dan, are earned separately of instructors' ranks. Each black belt is immediately eligible to earn an instructor degree upon earning their respective rank, but first must complete various training seminars (called NCITs), pass background checks, and demonstrate techniques in a manner similar to previous instructors. This is done to promote a sense of uniformity among schools, which are located all over the United States and Canada.

== See also ==
- Tang Soo Do
- Choi Hong Hi
- Black belt
- Martial arts
- List of taekwondo grandmasters
