= Hong Sung-chon =

Filipino Taekwondo master (b. 1945)

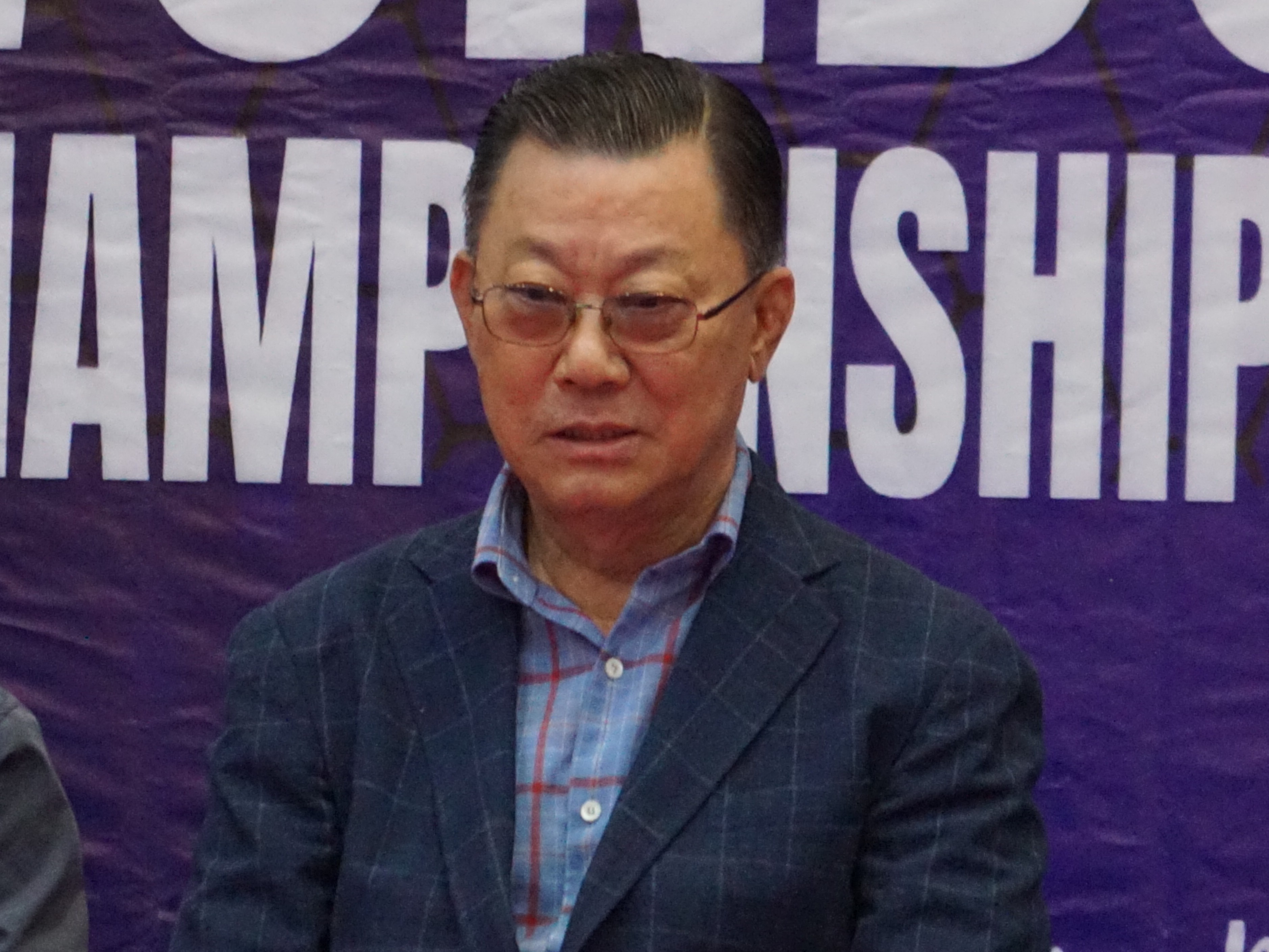
- Born: Hong Sung-chon; May 3, 1945
- Nationality: Korean
- Style: Taekwondo
- Rank: 9th degree black belt in Taekwondo

Other information
- Occupation: Instructor

Grand Master Hong Sung-chon (born May 3, 1945) is an early proponent of Taekwondo in the Philippines. In 1975, Grand Master Hong came to the Philippines to promote Taekwondo, eventually establishing the Philippine Taekwondo Association (PTA). He is Kukkiwon's chairman of the board and directors. He is the vice-president of the Philippine Taekwondo Association.

Among his students are Monsour del Rosario, who competed in various competitions before his career as an actor and later, politician.

== See also ==
- List of taekwondo grandmasters
