= Manchester Community College =

Manchester Community College may refer to:

- Manchester Community College (Connecticut)
- Manchester Community College (New Hampshire)

== See also ==
- Manchester College (disambiguation)
