= Hee-il Cho =

South Korean taekwondo practitioner

Cho Hee-il
- Born: October 13, 1940 (age 86); Pohang, Gyeongsangbuk-do, South Korea
- Nationality: South Korean; American
- Style: Taekwondo
- Rank: 9th dan taekwondo

Other information
- Website: http://www.aimaa.com/

Cho Hee-il (born October 13, 1940) is a prominent Korean-American master of taekwondo, holding the rank of 9th dan in the martial art. He has written 11 martial art books, produced 70 martial art training videos, and has appeared on more than 70 martial arts magazine covers. Cho won several national and international competitions as a taekwondo competitor, and has appeared in several films, including Fight to Win, Best of the Best, Bloodsport II, and Bloodsport III. He founded the Action International Martial Arts Association (AIMAA) in 1980, and is its President. Cho is a member of both Black Belt magazine's Hall of Fame and Tae Kwon Do Times magazine's Hall of Fame.

== Early life ==
Cho was born in Pohang, Korea, on 13 October 1940, during the period of Japanese occupation. He was the eldest of three brothers. He began training in the martial arts when he was around 10 years old. In an interview, he commented on his childhood in Pohang, Korea: "Although they were not really gang members, young people used to roam from town to town and beat up kids and take away their toys. One time, I was beaten up by some boys around 12 or 13 years old. At the time I thought it was pretty bad, so I wanted to protect myself." Cho attained the rank of 1st dan black belt by the age of 13, and had reached 4th dan by the age of 21. In addition to taekwondo, he also trained in boxing for two years.

== Career ==
In 1962, at the age of 22, Cho entered the Korean army for compulsory military service; during that time, he taught taekwondo to special forces in the Korean, Indian, and US armies. In 1968, Cho emigrated from South Korea to the United States of America. At the time, he held the rank of 6th dan. He initially moved to Chicago, but did not stay for long, moving through South Bend, Milwaukee, and Providence, before settling in Los Angeles in 1975. Cho was based in Los Angeles for around 25 years, before moving to Albuquerque, and a few years later, to Hawaii.

During his early days of teaching in the US, there were at least two incidents in which challengers attacked him, and, in one of these incidents, the challenger later sued him for injuries he received as a result of attacking Cho. Cho later commented in an interview: "All this has created a great conflict within me, for if I cannot use my skill to protect myself from any person who walks in off the street and demands a fight, how can I hope my students will retain confidence in my ability to teach them this skill? And yet, if I use my skill and hurt someone, even in self-defense, have I not betrayed the spirit of what martial arts are all about?"

Cho's books include Man of Contrasts (1977), The Complete Martial Artist (1981; two volumes), The Complete Tae Kwon Do Hyung (1984; three volumes covering the Chang Hon patterns), The Complete Tae Geuk Hyung WTF (1988), and The Complete One & Three Step Sparring (1988).

During the late 1980s, Cho was also Senior Grading Examiner of the Tae Kwon-Do Association of Great Britain and of Ireland, and was subsequently involved in Global Tae Kwon-Do International in the early 1990s.

== Action International Martial Arts Association ==
Action International Martial Arts Association
- Abbreviation: AIMAA
- Formation: 1980
- Type: Martial arts organization
- Legal status: active
- Purpose: training and competitions
- Headquarters: Honolulu, Hawaii, USA
- Location: Hawaii, Ireland, Scotland
- Region served: USA, Europe
- Official language: English
- Grandmaster: Hee Il Cho
- Website: A.I.M.A.A

Cho founded the Action International Martial Arts Association in 1980. This martial arts organization specializes in taekwondo, with schools in cities throughout the United States and Europe. The association sponsors various championships in Europe. Notable students include Philip Ameris and John D'arcy.

== Personal life ==
Cho has two brothers, Kuy-ha Cho (Vice-President of AIMAA) and In-kyu Cho (Chairman of AIMAA), who are also martial art masters. Cho's first wife was Sally Walsh, who demonstrates self-defence techniques in the second volume of Cho's Complete Martial Artist books. His second wife is named Mihyun. Cho has one son and one daughter: Jacob, 2nd dan, based in Laguna Beach, California and Jasmine, who also trains in taekwondo. Cho underwent open-heart surgery in 2006, and currently lives in Honolulu, Hawaii. He presided over his final AIMAA International Black Belt Tests at his school in Honolulu on November 23, 2025. Grandmaster Cho retired on November 30, 2025.

== Bibliography ==
- Man of Contrasts (1977)
- The Complete Martial Artist, Vol. 1 (1981)
- The Complete Martial Artist, Vol. 2 (1981)
- The Complete Tae Kwon Do Hyung, Vol. 1 (1984)
- The Complete Tae Kwon Do Hyung, Vol. 2 (1984)
- The Complete Tae Kwon Do Hyung, Vol. 3 (1984)
- The Complete Tae Geuk Hyung W.T.F (1988)
- The Complete Black Belt Hyung W.T.F (1988)
- The Complete Master's Kick (1988)
- The Complete Master's Jumping Kick (1988)
- The Complete One & Three Step Sparring (1988)

== See also ==
- International Taekwon-Do Federation
- Korea Taekwondo Association
- List of taekwondo grandmasters
