= Sun-hwan Chung =

South Korean martial artist

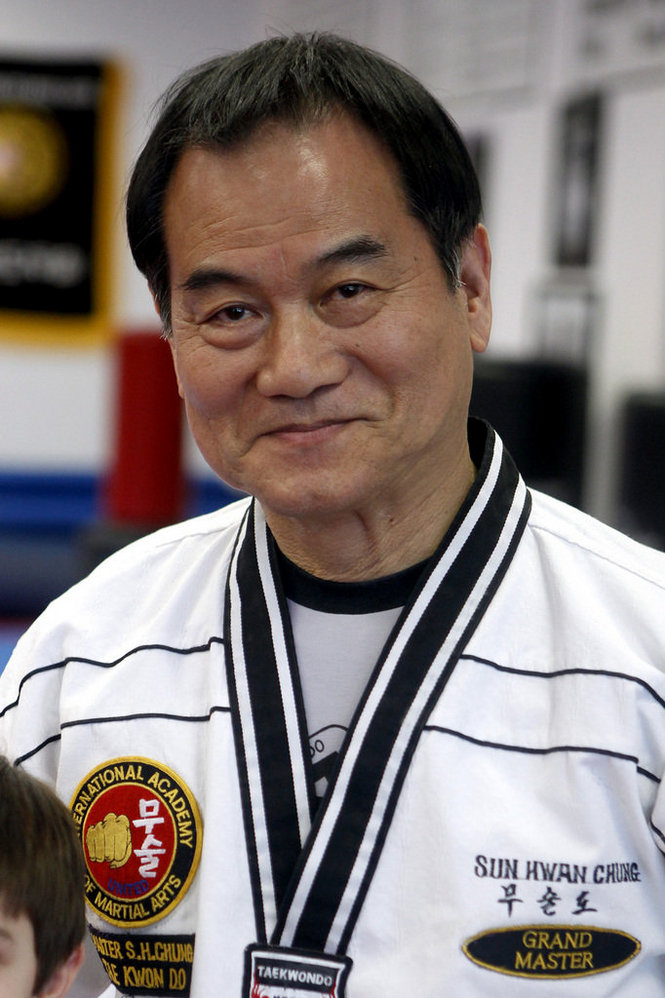
- Sun-hwan Chung; 10th Dan Taekwondo Grandmaster
- Born: May 6, 1940; Hiroshima, Japan
- Style: Moo Sool Do: Taekwondo, Hapkido, Tang Soo Do, Moo Sool Gi, Ki Gon
- Teachers: Hwang Kee, Founder of Moo Duk Kwan
- Rank: 10th dan (honorary); Moo Sool Do (Martial Arts United); 9th dan Taekwondo (Kukkiwon); 9th dan Tang Soo Do (Moo Duk Kwan); 9th dan Hapkido (Korea Hapkido Association)

Other information
- Occupation: Martial artist
- Website: Official website

Sun-hwan Chung (born May 8, 1940), also known as James Sun-hwan Chung, is one of the highest-ranking Tang Soo Do, Hapkido, and taekwondo grandmasters in the world. He is founder of the Moo Sool Do (Martial Arts United) form of martial arts and is president of the World Academy of Martial Arts, LLC.

== Early life and the Moo Duk Kwan ==
Sun-hwan Chung was born in Nagasaki, Japan and emigrated as a child to Korea. He began training in the martial arts when he was eight years old under Moo Duk Kwan founder Hwang Kee, and instructors Chang-young Chong (dan #15), Jong-soo Hong (dan #16), and Jae-joon Kim (dan #38). <3

He earned his first "black" belt (actually midnight blue) from Hwang Kee at age sixteen. For three years (1963-1967) Chung won the Korean Tae Kwon Do National Championships. In 1966, he won the Asian Championship. From 1967 to 1971, Chung managed Hwang Kee's main training dojang, located near Seoul Station (Jong Gu section of Dongja-dong) in downtown Seoul, Korea. Chung became proficient in several martial arts, studying Tang Soo Do, Hapkido, and Taekwondo. He created one of the essential poomse training forms for Tang Soo Do; Kicho Hyeong Sa Bu (Basic Form 4) as well as several others specific to Moo Sool Do.

During the 1980s, he was a martial arts combat instructor for the Republic of Korea Armed Forces and active-duty United States soldiers in Vietnam. In addition, he was a self-defense instructor to the Korean civilian police force and provided security services for the Korean national railroad system.

== Among the earliest U.S. masters ==
Chung was sent by Hwang Kee, in the fifth wave of Korean martial arts masters, to the United States on June 13, 1969. His American sponsor was Dale Drouillard, the second American to be recognized as a Cho Dan by Hwang. As a new arrival to the United States, Chung instructed at (Jae-joon) Kim's Karate School in Grand River, Michigan. As representative of the dojang, he traveled the country and sparred with Mariano Estioko (the second American to become a Cho Dan in the Moo Duk Kwan), David Praim, Russell Hanke, Pat E. Johnson, and hundreds of others, with losing one match. In addition to building a tremendous reputation worldwide as a ruthless fighter, Chung gained renown for his mental toughness, often performing demonstrations such as lifting large buckets of water using needles pierced in his arms and neck - while standing on broken glass, or having a car drive onto his chest. As his reputation grew, he gained many friendships with martial arts pioneers in the United States during the 1970s, including Sang Kyu Shim, Kang Uk Lee, Bong-soo Han, Jhoon Rhee, Mike Stone, and Chuck Norris.

== Development of the system ==
In September 1972, Chung moved to Kalamazoo, Michigan where he opened a dojang, teaching his own form of mixed martial arts - combining Taekwondo, Tang Soo Do, Hapkido, Moo Sool Gi, and Ki Gon - entitled Moo Sool Do (Martial Arts United). He has authored and published several training books in the Moo Sool Do system, and has continued to teach in Kalamazoo, as well as through other satellite dojangs, for more than forty years.

Chung was the thirty-third grandmaster to introduce Taekwondo, Hapkido, and Tang Soo Do to Bermuda in the early 1980s, through one of his students, David Avery. In addition, Chung teaches Moo Sool Do martial arts physical education classes at both Western Michigan University and Kalamazoo College.

He has served as vice president of the Michigan Tae Kwon Do Association, as a certified (Level 1) International Referee with both the World Taekwondo Federation and the United States Taekwondo Union, and as a member of the U.S.A.T. (Olympic National Governing Body) Martial Arts Commission. He has also been named Master Instructor of the Year several times by the Pan American Moo Duk Kwan Society. As one of the highest-ranking black belts in the United States, Chung was selected to serve on the testing panel and present Chuck Norris with his 7th dan black belt. He founded and has sponsored for 22 years, the Michigan Cup International Martial Arts Championships, a competitive forms and sparring tournament held annually in Battle Creek, Michigan.

== Awards and honors ==
- 1984 - Presented with the "Keys To The City Of Miami, Florida" by Mayor Maurice Ferre, in recognition of his contributions to the martial arts.
- 1993 - 9th dan Grandmaster certification Kukkiwon - World Taekwondo Federation.
- 2000 - 9th dan Grandmaster certification Tang Soo Do - Moo Duk Kwan.
- 2003 - 9th dan Grandmaster certification Korea Hapkido Federation.
- 2007 - Enshrined in the Taekwondo Hall of Fame.
- 2008 - Selected to the Kukkiwon Advisory Council by organization President Dr. Un Yong Kim.
- 2009 - Awarded the Outstanding Educational Leadership Award (Hall of Fame) by Martial Arts World.
- 2010 - Inducted into the U.S. Taekwondo Grandmasters Hall of Fame for Lifetime Achievement.
- 2013 - Honorary 10th dan - Moo Sool Do (Martial Arts United).
