= Brenda Sell =

American taekwondo practitioner

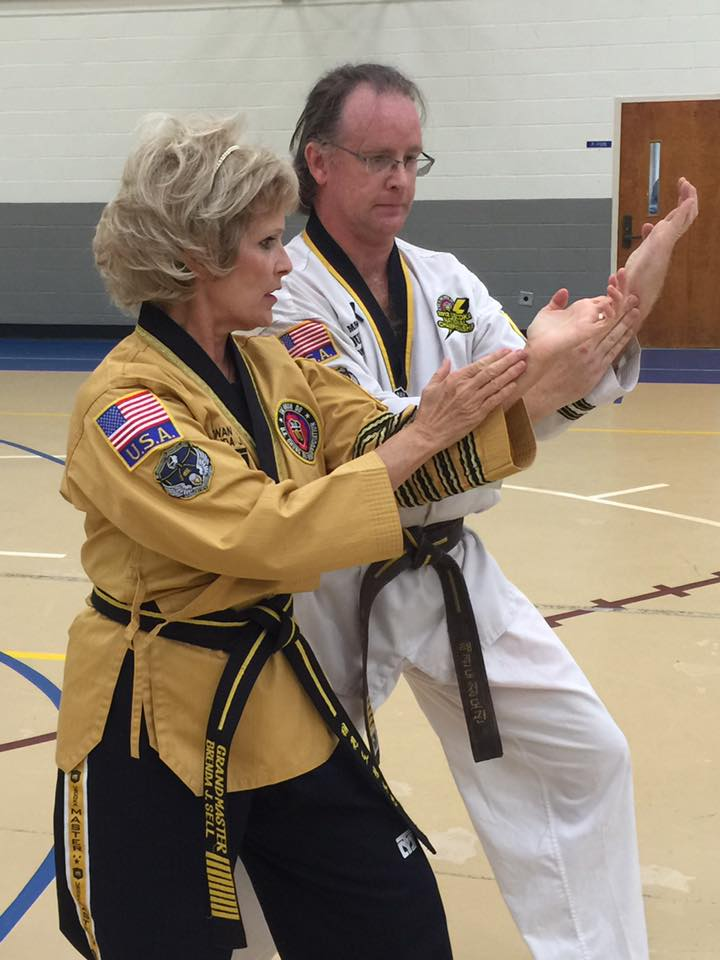
- Born: January 23, 1955 (age 71)
- Nationality: American
- Style: Taekwondo Chung Do Kwan
- Teachers: Edward B. Sell, Park Hae-man, Uhm Woon-kyu
- Rank: 9th degree black belt in taekwondo

Other information
- Website: http://tkd.grandmasterbrendasell.com/

Brenda J. Sell (born 1955) is an American martial arts instructor, and the highest ranking non-Korean female practitioner of taekwondo, according to the Kukkiwon, an international ranking body within Taekwondo. She holds the rank of 9th degree black belt in the art.

== Biography ==
Sell is the president/CEO of the United States Chung Do Kwan Association (USCDKA) and the only non-Asian female person to be recognized by the Kukkiwon as a 9th Dan Black Belt in the Chung Do Kwan style of Taekwondo, making her the highest ranked non-Asian female Tae Kwon Do practitioner in the world. This announcement was made at the Kukkiwon testing in Denver, Colorado in June 2017. Sell began her Taekwondo Journey at the age of 14, in the state of Michigan. Sell earned her 1st degree black belt in two years.

Sell has been teaching and training in the art of Taekwondo Chung Do Kwan for over 50 years, alongside of her husband, Edward B. Sell who died in February 2014.

Before his death, Edward Sell appointed Brenda Sell both the position of President of the USCDKA in 2003, and the position of CEO of the organization in 2013.

Sell was one of the first females to be certified as an international referee for the World Taekwondo Federation in 1977. In 1988 Sell and 2 other female referees officiated in the first female division in Barcelona, Spain.

In 1981, Sell and her husband founded the Evangelistic Taekwondo Exhibitions, which would eventually be renamed The Sell Team Ministry. This team uses Taekwondo to teach their Christian faith to places like schools, fundraising events, prison ministries, West Point Academy, etc. The Sell Team Ministry is a non-denominational Christian demonstration team.

In 2014, Sell was diagnosed with Breast Cancer, and was declared cancer free in 2017.

Today, Sell retains her leadership position with the United States Chung Do Kwan Association, and continues to train and teach throughout the country. She also teaches regularly at her own school, The Sell Team Academy, in Lakeland, Florida at the Lakeland Square Mall.

== Career ==
Sell began her training in 1970, and attained her black belt in 1972. She competed in the tournament circuit during the years 1970-1975. In 1977, she would become the first female to be awarded the World Taekwondo Federation certification for international level referee credentials. She earned her 4th degree black belt, and master's degree in 1978.

Sell co-found the Evangelistic Taekwondo Exhibitions (currently known as the Sell Team Ministries), which would involve crusades in the military bases all over the country. In 1983, Sell was invited to Korea for the first ever international female competition at the 1st pre-world games. Sell was appointed as an international referee for the 1st Women's World Taekwondo Championships at the 1987 World Taekwondo Championships in Barcelona, Spain. She was awarded the Black Belt of the Decade.

Sell became the first female promoted to 7th degree black belt in the World Chung Do Kwan Association by her instructor, Park Hae-man, who is currently a 9th degree black belt, and the head of the Kukkiwon, and the World Chung Do Kwan Association, as well as obtain her Kukkiwon 7th degree credentials from the World Taekwondo Federation. She would create the first CD Rom training videos for all of the World Taekwondo Federation Taguek forms, become an ordained minister, be inducted into the Hall of Fame as an Outstanding Female Master, and take the Crusade demo team to Osan Air Force base.

Brenda Sell and The Sell Team performed at West Point Military Academy, US Air Force Academy, and in Korea. The Commonwealth of Kentucky commissioned her as a Kentucky Colonel. Sell was promoted to 8th degree black belt by Park Hae-man in the World Chung Do Kwan Association, then in the Kukkiwon. Sell accepted the title of President of the United States Chung Do Kwan Association, and establish Presidential Tours throughout the United States and British Columbia. Sell and her husband were invited to address Chaplain Generals at the Pentagon, developed a Sanctioned Tournament System for the USCDKA, created a DVD training system that would allow any student 1-on-1 access, and made the DVDs available to Century Martial Arts.

Sell was awarded the Gold Lifetime Achievement Award in 2010, during which time, she also opened The Sell Team Academy of Taekwondo, which serves as the National Headquarters for the United States Chung Do Kwan Association. In 2012, she was awarded her 9th degree black belt by Park Hae-man, and in 2017, she was awarded her 9th degree black belt by the Kukkiwon High Dan Testing Board at a special, historical testing in Denver, Colorado. She was named the highest ranked American female in all of Taekwondo, and only the 2nd female to ever attempt a 9th degree Kukkiwon black belt.
