= 1976 Asian Taekwondo Championships =

Taekwondo competition

- Venue: Dallas Brooks Hall
- Location: Melbourne, Australia
- Dates: 16–17 October 1976

Champions
- Men: South Korea

The 1976 Asian Taekwondo Championships were the 2nd edition of the Asian Taekwondo Championships, and were held in Melbourne, Australia from 16 to 17 October, 1976.

== Medal summary ==
Event	Gold	Silver	Bronze
Finweight (−48 kg)	Choi Yoon-ki; South Korea	Roberto Evangelista; Philippines	Chia Pheng Pheng; Singapore
Finweight (−48 kg)	Choi Yoon-ki; South Korea	Roberto Evangelista; Philippines	Brendan Drew; Australia
Flyweight (−53 kg)	Kim Yong-ki; South Korea	Paul Cabatingan; Philippines	Yau Chee Hong; Australia
Flyweight (−53 kg)	Kim Yong-ki; South Korea	Paul Cabatingan; Philippines	Aw Chong Tiong; Malaysia
Bantamweight (−58 kg)	Son Tae-hwan; South Korea	Abdul Hamid Noor; Malaysia	Peter Robinson; Australia
Bantamweight (−58 kg)	Son Tae-hwan; South Korea	Abdul Hamid Noor; Malaysia	Jaime Martin; Philippines
Featherweight (−63 kg)	Kim Moo-chun; South Korea	Lye Kwong; Malaysia	Martin Hall; Australia
Featherweight (−63 kg)	Kim Moo-chun; South Korea	Lye Kwong; Malaysia	Narcisco Erana; Philippines
Lightweight (−68 kg)	Choi Jae-chun; South Korea	Michael Adey; Australia	Adrian Nair; New Zealand
Lightweight (−68 kg)	Choi Jae-chun; South Korea	Michael Adey; Australia	Lum Chiang Fai; Malaysia
Welterweight (−73 kg)	Yoo Yong-hap; South Korea	John Soh Tiong; Singapore	Ramon Tusi; Philippines
Welterweight (−73 kg)	Yoo Yong-hap; South Korea	John Soh Tiong; Singapore	Bradley McDonald; Australia
Middleweight (−80 kg)	Kim Chul-hwan; South Korea	Colin Handley; Australia	Ooi Peng Shew; Malaysia
Middleweight (−80 kg)	Kim Chul-hwan; South Korea	Colin Handley; Australia	Low Fang Lian; Singapore
Heavyweight (+80 kg)	Kim Duk-soo; South Korea	Shane Bray; Australia	Elmer Pato; Philippines
Heavyweight (+80 kg)	Kim Duk-soo; South Korea	Shane Bray; Australia	Harry Singh; Singapore

== Medal table ==
Rank	Nation	Gold	Silver	Bronze	Total
1	South Korea	8	0	0	8
2	Australia	0	3	5	8
3	Philippines	0	2	4	6
4	Malaysia	0	2	3	5
5	Singapore	0	1	3	4
6	New Zealand	0	0	1	1
Totals (6 entries)		8	8	16	32
