= Kong Young-il =

South Korean taekwondo practitioner

- Born: 1943 (age 82–83); Korea
- Style: Taekwondo
- Teachers: Choi Hong-hi, Nam Tae-hi
- Rank: 9th dan taekwondo (ITF)

Kong Young-il (born 1943) is a South Korean master of taekwondo and one of the twelve original masters of taekwondo of the Korea Taekwon-Do Association. He holds the rank of 9th dan. Following a career in the South Korean military, he emigrated to the United States of America in the late 1960s.

== Early life ==
Kong was born in 1943 in Korea, during the period of Japanese occupation. He began training in martial arts in 1952, starting with Shotokan karate. In 1958, he moved to Won Joo. Kong won a scholarship to study at Kyung Hee University, and while in its Physical Education College, was required to train in judo. From 1963–1967, he served in the South Korean army, attaining the rank of Sergeant. Kong trained in taekwondo under Choi Hong-hi and Nam Tae-hi. Through the late 1960s and 1970s, Kong was a key member of the taekwondo demonstration teams that accompanied H. H. Choi around the world.

== United States ==
Kong moved to the United States of America just before or in 1968. He and his younger brother, Young Bo Kong, founded the Young Brothers Taekwondo Associates in 1968, which is now located in Houston, Las Vegas, and Pittsburgh. In an interview, Y. B. Kong said that he arrived in the United States in 1972. In 1973, Kong held the rank of 7th dan. Kong has another brother, Young Joon Kong, who also competed and was involved in teaching taekwondo, but retired and became a golfer.

Kong was promoted to the rank of 9th dan in 1997 by H. H. Choi in Poland. He has two sons, Andy and Douglas, and two daughters. and appears on Choi Chang-keun's list of taekwondo pioneers.

== See also ==
- International Taekwon-Do Federation
- List of taekwondo grandmasters
