= Paul Cabatingan =

Personal information
- Full name: Paul Cayetano Cabatingan
- Nationality: Filipino
- Occupation: Lawyer
- Weight: 53

Sport
- Country: Philippines
- Sport: Taekwondo
- Event: +53kg
Medal record
Representing Philippines
Men's taekwondo
Asian Championship
Silver medal – second place	1976 Melbourne	53 kg

Paul Cabatingan is a Filipino athlete who competed in taekwondo and a pioneer of the same in the Philippines. He won a silver medal at the 1976 Asian Taekwondo Championships and in Guayaquil in 1982 in the 53 kg category. He is now a lawyer by profession passing the Philippine Bar Examination in 2016.
