= Kyung-Ho Min =

Korean judoka

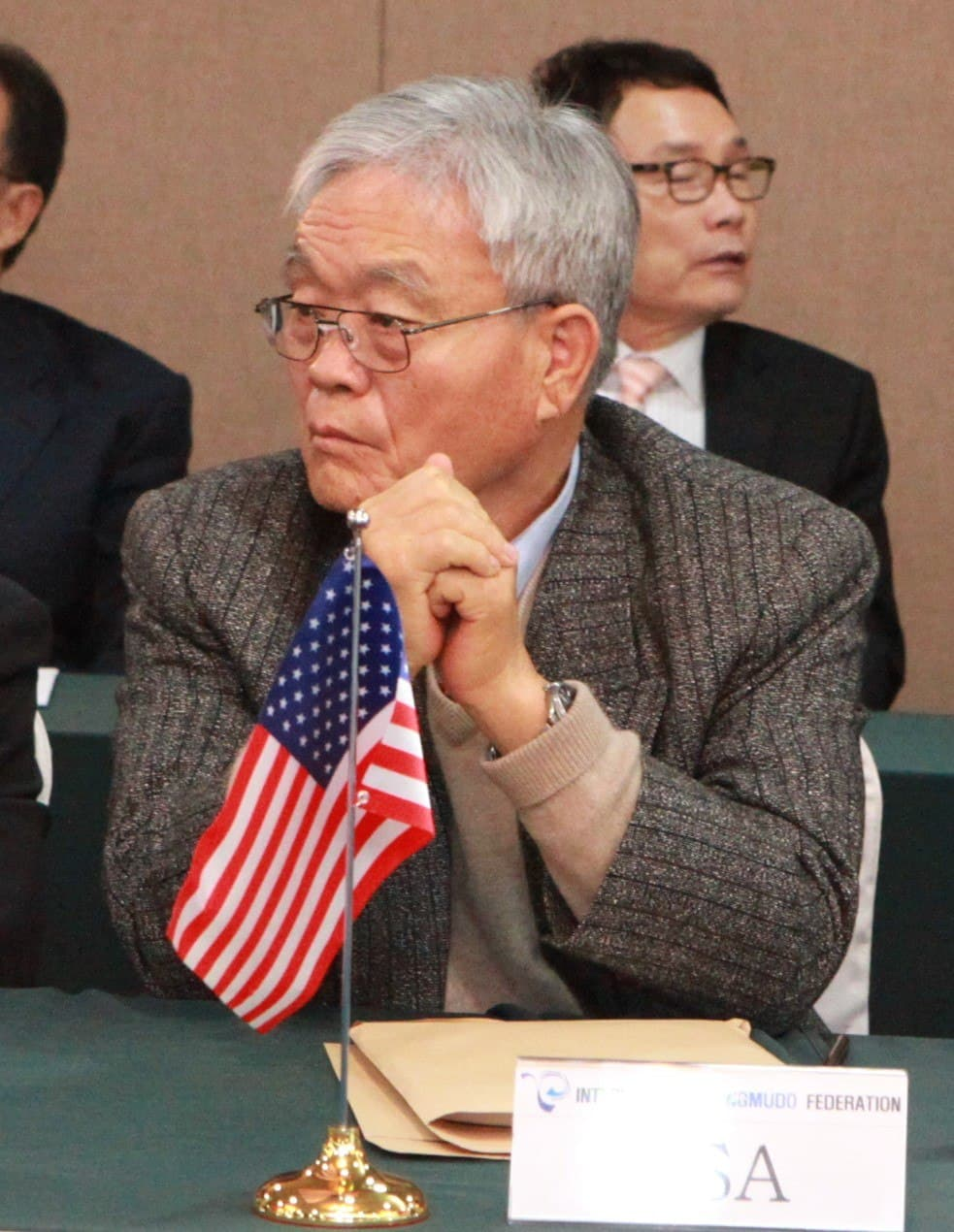
- Born: 1935 (age 90–91)
- Nationality: Korean
- Style: judo

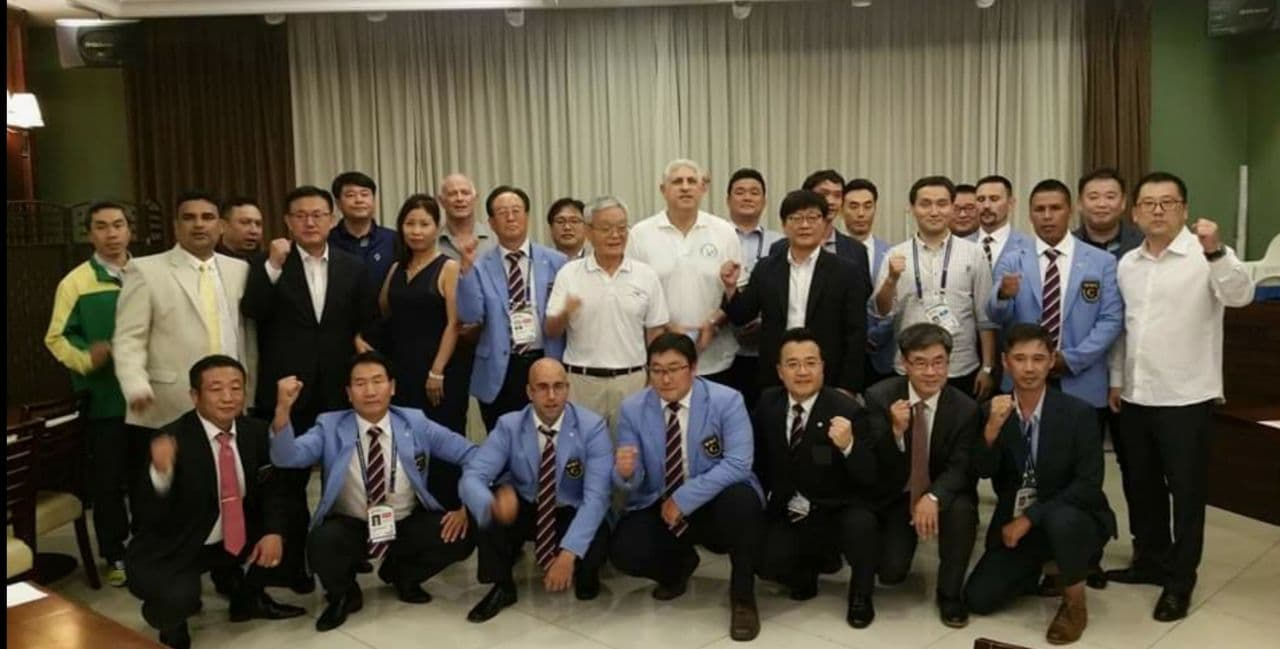
Min in the meeting of Yongmudo practitioners in World Martial Arts Masterships 2016

Kyung-Ho (Ken) Min (born 1935) is an American judoka, taekwondo and yongmudo practitioner, and the founder of University of California Martial Arts Program.
