= Manchester College =

Manchester College might refer to:

== England ==
- Manchester College, a former name of Harris Manchester College, Oxford
- Manchester Metropolitan University, formerly Manchester Polytechnic, formed in 1977 by a merger between Manchester College of Art and Design and Manchester College of Commerce; in 1983 the City of Manchester College of Higher Education was also folded in
- The Manchester College, formed in 2008 by a merger between
  - City College Manchester, a network of further education colleges
  - Manchester College of Arts and Technology

== United States ==
- Manchester College (Indiana), a university in North Manchester, Indiana
- Manchester Community College (Connecticut) in Manchester, Connecticut
- Manchester Community College (New Hampshire) in Manchester, New Hampshire

== See also ==
- Category:Education in Manchester
