= S. Henry Cho =

South Korean taekwondo practitioner

- Born: Cho Si-hak; November 9, 1934; Korea
- Died: March 8, 2012 (aged 77)
- Education: University of Illinois (MBA)
- Occupation: Taekwondo teacher
- Known for: martial arts, bringing martial arts to the United States
- Website: henrycho.com

Sihak Henry Cho (November 9, 1934 – March 8, 2012), was a Korean taekwondo pioneer and instructor with the ranking of 9th dan who is recognized as one of the first people to introduce Asian martial arts into the United States of America. He was the student of Yun Kwei-byung . S. Henry Cho was originally a teacher of Kong Soo Do.

== Life and career ==
Grandmaster Cho arrived in the USA in 1958 after receiving his B.A. degree from Korea University in Seoul, Korea to pursue a Master's Degree in Business Administration at the University of Illinois. Upon graduation, Grandmaster Cho moved to New York City for work and ended up creating many branch schools across the nation. He opened the first permanent, commercial Tae Kwon Do school in the United States in 1961 which he personally ran for over 40 years. He was the creator and promoter of the All American Open Tae Kwon Do/ Karate/ Kung Fu Championship Tournament which ran for 50 years. During his lifetime he met and knew many notable American martial artists including Bruce Lee, Chuck Norris, Ki Whang Kim, Donald Hugh Nagle, Peter Urban and Ron Duncan to name a few.

The All American Open was held for 23 consecutive years at Madison Square Garden, and was attended by notable martial artists; Bruce Lee met Chuck Norris for the first time at the All American Open.

Grandmaster Cho is the recipient of the Hall of Fame (Man of the Year) Award by Karate magazine, and the 2011 Lifetime Achievement Award from the President’s Council on Sports, Fitness & Nutrition.

Grandmaster Cho is also the author of a number of books including Korean Karate: Free Fighting Techniques. He was a member of the US Tae Kwon Do Grand Master Association. He was president of the World Council of Martial Arts, Inc from 1991-2012. Grandmaster Cho has been featured on numerous magazines including the cover of Black Belt Magazine in 1979 and 2007.

He served as the head coach for the St. John's University Tae Kwon Do Club.

== Publications ==
Tae Kwon Do: Secrets of Korean Karate; Charles E. Tuttle Co., 1968
Korean Karate: Free Fighting Techniques; Charles E. Tuttle Co., 1968
Better Karate for Boys; Dodd, Mead & Co., 1969
Self-Defense Karate; Stravon Publications, 1970

== See also ==
- List of taekwondo grandmasters
