= Park Jung-tae =

South Korean martial artist

- Born: c. 1943; Korea
- Died: April 11, 2002 (aged 58–59); Canada
- Style: Taekwondo
- Rank: 9th dan taekwondo (GTF), 8th dan taekwondo (ITF)

Other information
- Notable students: Sabree Salleh
- Website: https://www.gtftaekwondo.com/

Park Jung-tae (Korean: 박정태; Hanja: 朴炡泰; c. 1943 – 11 April 2002) was a South Korean master of taekwondo and a pioneer of that martial art in Canada. He was one of the twelve original masters of taekwondo of the Korea Taekwon-Do Association. Following a career in the South Korean military, Park emigrated to Canada in 1970. He was a key leader in the International Taekwon-Do Federation (ITF) under Choi Hong-hi, but founded the Global Taekwon-Do Federation in 1990 after leaving the ITF. After teaching taekwondo for many years, Park died in 2002.

== Early life ==
Park was born in 1943 or 1944 in Korea, during the period of Japanese occupation. He began training in the martial arts as a child, starting with boxing before moving on to judo and then taekwondo. Park was one of the twelve original taekwondo masters of the Korea Taekwon-Do Association. In 1964, he was the second President of the Korean Tae Soo Do Association. From 1965 to 1967, he was ranked 4th dan and directed instruction of soldiers in Vietnam.

== Canada ==
Park moved to Canada where he met his future wife, Linda, in Toronto in 1970. During the 1970s, Park established the Manitoba Tae Kwon-Do Association. In 1975, he was ranked 6th dan. In 1978 and 1979, he accompanied Choi on taekwondo demonstration tours in Europe. In 1984, he conducted a seminar in Brisbane, Australia. At the time, he was ranked 8th dan in the ITF. In November 1984, Park was elected Secretary-General of the ITF. He also held the position of Technical Chairman of the ITF.

Park founded the Global Taekwondo Federation (GTF) on 14 June 1990, the year after his departure from the ITF due to North–South Korean political issues. He created six additional hyung to be practised along with the earlier ITF patterns. Amongst those who affiliated with the GTF was Sabree Salleh in 1998. Shortly before he died, Park promoted Salleh to 9th dan (GTF).

== Later life ==
Park died on 11 April 2002 due to poor health, and is survived by his wife and their children: Juliann, Heather, and Christopher. Linda Park succeeded her husband as President of the GTF, and holds honorary 9th dan ranking.

Park is listed as a pioneer in Canada (1970s) in Chang Keun Choi's list of taekwondo pioneers.

== See also ==
- List of taekwondo grandmasters
