= Kwang Sung Hwang =

South Korean Taekwon-Do practitioner

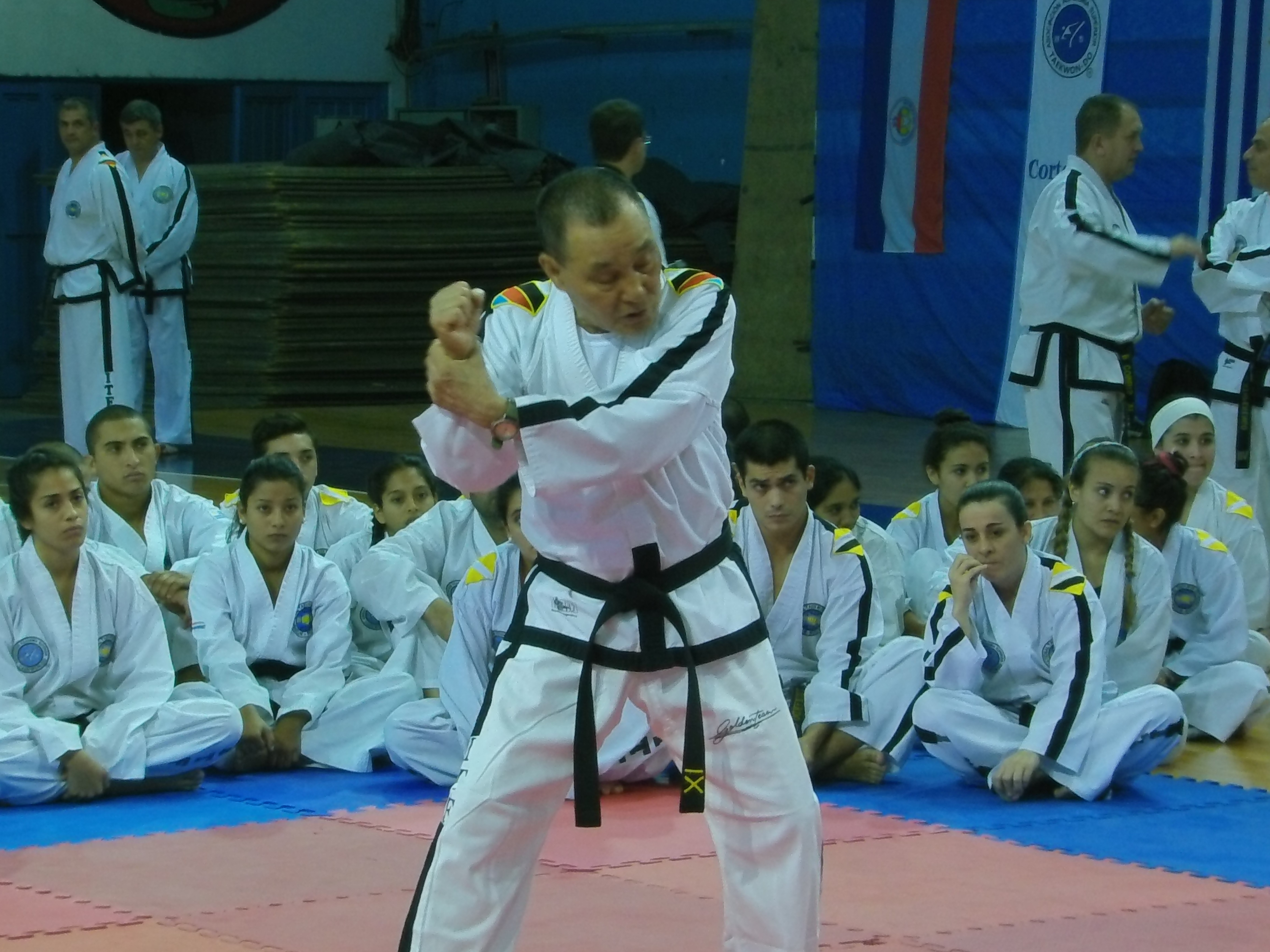
- Born: 13 September 1942 (age 84); Taegu, Korea
- Died: December 29th, 2025; Farmington, CT
- Style: Taekwon-Do
- Teacher: Choi Hong-hi
- Rank: 9th dan Taekwon-Do (ITF)

Hwang Kwang-sung (born 13 September 1942) is a South Korean grand master of Taekwon-Do, a notable officer of the International Taekwon-Do Federation (ITF), the second President of KoreAmerica Taekwon-Do Union (KATU) after the first Master Cho, Dae-sung was replaced by General Choi Hong Hi who founded the organization, founder and president of Unified International Taekwon-Do Federation.

== Personal life ==
Hwang Kwang-sung was born in Taegu, Korea, in 1942. He started martial arts training at age eleven. Before training with General Choi Hong Hi he studied under Grandmaster Kwang Kee, who was the founder of Moo Duk Kwan (Tang Soo Do).

Grandmaster Hwang Kwang Sung started learning at the age of 11 in South Korea. He trained with Hwang Kee and in Tang Soo Do, and the official records from the Moo Duk Kwan Dan Bon system show him as Dan Bon #6523. Grandmaster Hwang kept training to 2nd degree Blackbelt. He eventually transitioned to General Choi when the kwans united under the Taekwon-Do name. After studying political science at Kyungpook National University, he attended the Infantry Officer Candidate School in the Republic of Korea Army (ROKA) and graduated as a Second Lieutenant. Subsequently, he attended the ROK Army Taekwon-Do International Instructors School. In 1968–1969, he was one of the Taekwon-Do instructors dispatched to Vietnam during the war. While in Vietnam, as a Captain in the ROK Army, he taught Taekwon-Do to the Korean Tiger Division, the Korean Army, US Army, US Marines, and Vietnamese Army. While in Vietnam, he received commendation medals from Korea and Vietnam. In 1970 Grand Master Hwang retired from the ROK Army as a Captain, and Service Company Commander of the 26th Infantry Division which was also known as the Taekwon-Do Division. .

== ITF career ==
Leaving his military career, Hwang was invited to the US and first taught a credited course at Manchester Community Technical College in 1971. He opened his first Taekwon-Do school the following year. In 1974, Hwang graduated from the first International Taekwon-Do Federation (ITF) Instructors Course and Umpires Course hosted and taught by General Choi Hong-hi in Montreal, Quebec, Canada. Hwang took students to train at General Choi's home in the early-mid 70's. In October 1976, he hosted General Choi Cup tournament. He subsequently started taking private lessons from General Choi in the 1980s after being promoted to seventh degree Master in Taekwon-Do. He led the U.S. Team at the 8th ITF World Championships in Pyongyang at North Korea's Taekwon-Do Palace. He assisted General Choi in many seminars worldwide.

Hwang simultaneously served as special assistant to General Choi, official spokesman of the ITF, chairman of the ITF promotion and merger committees, and Secretary General of the ITF. 1997 was a monumental year for ITF and General Choi as he promoted three men to 9th degree that year with Grand Master Rhee Ki-ha (UK-9-1) promoted in July 1997 followed by Grand Master Charles Sereff (A-9-1) and Grand Master Hwang Kwang-sung (K-9-1) in December 1997. He was one of only a handful of men promoted to 9th Dan by General Choi.
