= Tae-hong Choi =

Korean grandmaster in taekwondo

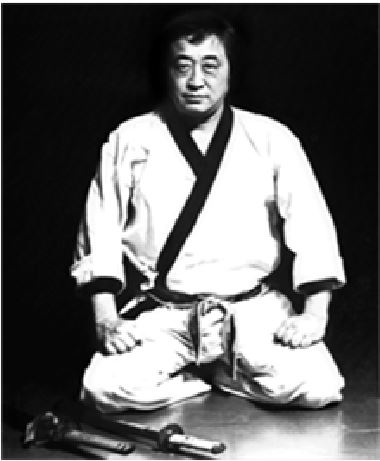
- Born: Choi Tae-hong; May 28, 1935; Small village on the Yalu River, Chinese/North Korea border
- Died: March 8, 2009 (aged 73); Portland, Oregon, United States
- Nationality: Korean
- Style: Taekwondo
- Trainer: Dr. Yoon Kwe-byung
- Rank: 9th degree black belt in Taekwondo 5th degree black belt in Hapkido 5th degree black belt in Judo

Other information
- Occupation: Instructor
- Spouse: Man Soon Choi
- Children: Ilsun Kim, Minsun Min, Hung Choi and Sung Choi
- Notable students: Scott Rohr, Gordon Graaff, Leon Preston, and Naim Hasan Cliff Doran
- Website: https://choitkdacademy.com/

Tae-hong Choi (May 28, 1935 – March 8, 2009) was a grandmaster in taekwondo, winner of multiple martial arts titles and a teacher of thousands of students in Oregon.

== Childhood studies ==
When Choi was a boy in Seoul, he had a paper route. When he first approached the martial artists he met on his route, they sent him away. After seven days of his pestering, the men seemed to relent, but they put him to work instead of teaching him. Choi worked for them for three weeks before they were sufficiently impressed to begin teaching him. He earned his black belt in two years. He soon began winning titles including Korean National Champion. Eventually he earned a ninth-degree black belt, the sport's highest designation. He also studied for a master's degree in Health and physical education.

== Military service ==
Choi was a Korean Marine Corp Training officer stationed in South Vietnam. He was part of the detail that guarded the U.S. Embassy. He taught hand-to-hand combat skills to Korean, South Vietnamese and U.S. Special Forces. That got him his next job of instructing hand-to-hand combat for top-level U.S. security agents.

== Emigration ==
Choi moved to Washington, D.C., in 1971. He taught taekwondo to secret service agents and CIA operatives. His family did not move with him to Washington, D.C., but they emigrated to Oregon where a distant cousin lived. In 1972, Choi joined his family in Oregon and started teaching tae kwon do at the YMCA, Lewis and Clark College and Reed College (Judo - '74-'75), and Sunset High School before opening his own studio in Northeast Portland. Choi's Taekwondo Academy was the second taekwondo school in Oregon.

The first Portland school was formed by in 1958 Korean Moon Yo Woo (the Yan Moo Kwan of KongSu—-then the name for taekwondo) whose first blackbelt was Bruce Terrill, who taught KongSu in Portland until approximately 1968.

"Mr. Choi was one of the pioneers for tae kwon do in this country. When the word 'tae kwon do' didn't even exist in this country, he was already teaching."
-- Joon Pyo Choi, co-chairman of USA Taekwondo's martial arts commission.

Choi eventually opened two more schools for students in Beaverton and North Portland. His son, Sung Choi did take over the studios after his death with the help of Hung Choi. Later, Sung Choi started teaching at the "New York Athletic Club' location in NYC.

== National leadership ==
Choi founded the Oregon State Taekwondo Association and the Northwest Black Belt Association and was its president for 30 years. In 1980, Choi served as head of team at the first Pan American Taekwondo Championships. In 1982, When the Amateur Athletic Union was the governing body for Taekwondo in the USA, Choi was elected vice president. He also served as a vice president in the United States TaeKwonDo Union. He has served as tournament director of the Northwest Oregon Taekwondo Championships and the 17th U.S. National Taekwondo Championships. In 1988, Choi traveled to Seoul with one of his students who competed in the 1988 Olympic Games. In the 1990s, he served as advisor to the United States Taekwondo Union. In 2007, Choi received the lifetime achievement award from the United States Taekwondo Grandmasters Society. Some of his notable students are Master Leon Preston (8th Dan and 2008 Summer Olympics Tae Kwon Do Referee), Gordon Graaff, Grandmaster Scott Rohr (1979 and 1980 World Championship Medalist) and Naim Hassan (1988 Olympics Taekwondo demonstration “exhibition” sport athlete.)

== Death and burial ==
Choi died at Providence Portland Medical Center in Portland, Oregon on March 8, 2009. Services were held March 12 in the Korean Mission Church (Portland). He was buried at Skyline Memorial Gardens (Portland), He was survived by his wife, two daughters, two sons and five grandchildren.

== See also ==
- List of taekwondo grandmasters
