= Philippine Taekwondo Association =

Taekwondo association

- Sport: Taekwondo
- Abbreviation: PTA
- Founded: 1976
- Affiliation: World Taekwondo
- Headquarters: Manila, Philippines
- President: Rafael Alunan III

Official website
- philippinetaekwondo.org
- (Philippines)

The Philippine Taekwondo Association (PTA) is the national sports governing body for taekwondo in the Philippines.

== History ==
The World Taekwondo Federation (WTF, later simplified as World Taekwondo) in 1976 sent international master instructors to the Philippines led by Hong Sung-chon to promote taekwondo in the Philippines. The Philippine Taekwondo Association (PTA) was within the same year.

Carlos Palanca Jr. is the inaugural president of the PTA. With Hong, Palanca oversaw the establishment of the National Taekwondo Championship in 1979, as well as the introduction of Taekwondo in the University Athletic Association of the Philippines in 1987.

The Taekwondo Black Brotherhood (TBB) and Sorority (TBS) was established in 1980 which consists of PTA athletes.

Robert Aventajado assumed the PTA presidency following the death of Palanca in 1988. The annual national competition to determine the roster of the national taekwondo team has been posthumously named after Palanca starting the 1988 edition under the Aventajado administration.

At the 1992 Summer Olympics in Barcelona where taekwondo was featured as a demonstration sport, the PTA sent Stephen Fernandez and Bea Lucero who won bronze medals in their respective divisions.

The Philippines became the first Asian country apart from South Korea to host the World Taekwondo Championships when it hosted the 1995 edition in Manila.

By 2023, Rafael Alunan III is the PTA president.

== Tournaments ==
The PTA organizes seven major national tournaments.

- Carlos Palanca Jr. Championships
- New Face of the Year Championships
- All Women Championships
- National Championships
- MVP Best of the Best Championships
- National Age Group Championships
- National Inter-School Championships

== Virtual Taekwondo ==
The PTA also covers WT-endorsed virtual reality game Virtual Taekwondo, having produced Zyka Santiago who won the young adult mixed division of the inaugural 2024 World Taekwondo Virtual Championships.

== Controversies ==
On September 21, 2020, the two-time Olympian Donald Geisler was expelled from the association amid a legal battle against the Philippine Taekwondo Association.

== Presidents ==
- Carlos Palanca Jr.
- Robert Aventajado
- Rafael Alunan III

== See also ==
- Taekwondo in the Philippines
