= Tae Kwon Do Times =

Taekwondo magazine

- Managing Director: Kyle Franklin
- Categories: Martial art, Sport
- Frequency: Bimonthly
- Publisher: Woo Jin Jung
- First issue: 1980
- Company: Tri Mount Publications Inc.
- Country: United States of America
- Based in: Cedar Rapids, Iowa
- Language: English
- Website: www.taekwondotimes.com

Tae Kwon Do Times is a magazine devoted to the martial art of taekwondo, and is published in the United States of America. While the title suggests that it focuses on taekwondo exclusively, the magazine also covers other Korean martial arts. Tae Kwon Do Times has published articles by a wide range of authors, including He-Young Kimm, Thomas Kurz, Scott Shaw, and Mark Van Schuyver.

Tae Kwon Do Times is a widely known publication within the international taekwondo community, appearing in several organizations' websites^{[a]} and individuals' biographies.^{[b]} Shaw lists it as one of five important taekwondo periodicals in his book, Taekwondo basics.^{[c]} Tae Kwon Do Times is also one of five named publications listed in Black Belt magazine's reader surveys in 1999,^{[d]} and one of ten key periodicals listed in Marc Tedeschi's book, Combattimento con le armi: Autodifesa armata e disarmata (The art of weapons: Armed and unarmed self-defense).^{[e]}

Tae Kwon Do Times was founded in 1980 by Chung Eun Kim (1941–2010), a taekwondo master, and his wife, Soja Kim. The Kims retired from their involvement in the magazine in 2005. Currently, Woo Jin Jung is the Publisher and Chief Executive Officer of the magazine. Tae Kwon Do Times maintains correspondents both inside the US, such as Jere Hilland, and outside the US, such as Joon No in Australia and George Ashiru in Nigeria.

== Notes ==
a. Several martial art schools and other martial art organizations mention Tae Kwon Do Times, cite articles from it, or reproduce portions of it.

b. Several martial artists refer to their biographies, articles, or awards published in Tae Kwon Do Times.

c. The other periodicals listed are: Australasian Taekwondo (Australia), Black Belt Magazine (USA), Martial Arts (USA), and Taekwondo Choc Magazine (France).

d. The other periodicals listed are: Karate/Kung Fu Illustrated, Martial Arts Training, Inside Kung Fu, and Inside Karate (all published in the USA).

e. The other periodicals listed are: Aikido Journal (Japan), Black Belt (USA), Dragon Times (USA), The Empty Vessel: A journal of contemporary Taoism (USA), Inside Karate (USA), Inside Kung Fu (USA), Internal Martial Arts (USA), Journal of Asian Martial Arts (USA), and Tai Chi and Alternative Health (UK).
