= Kukkiwon =

South Korean taekwondo governing body

Coordinates: 37.5020°N 127.0303°E

- 국기원
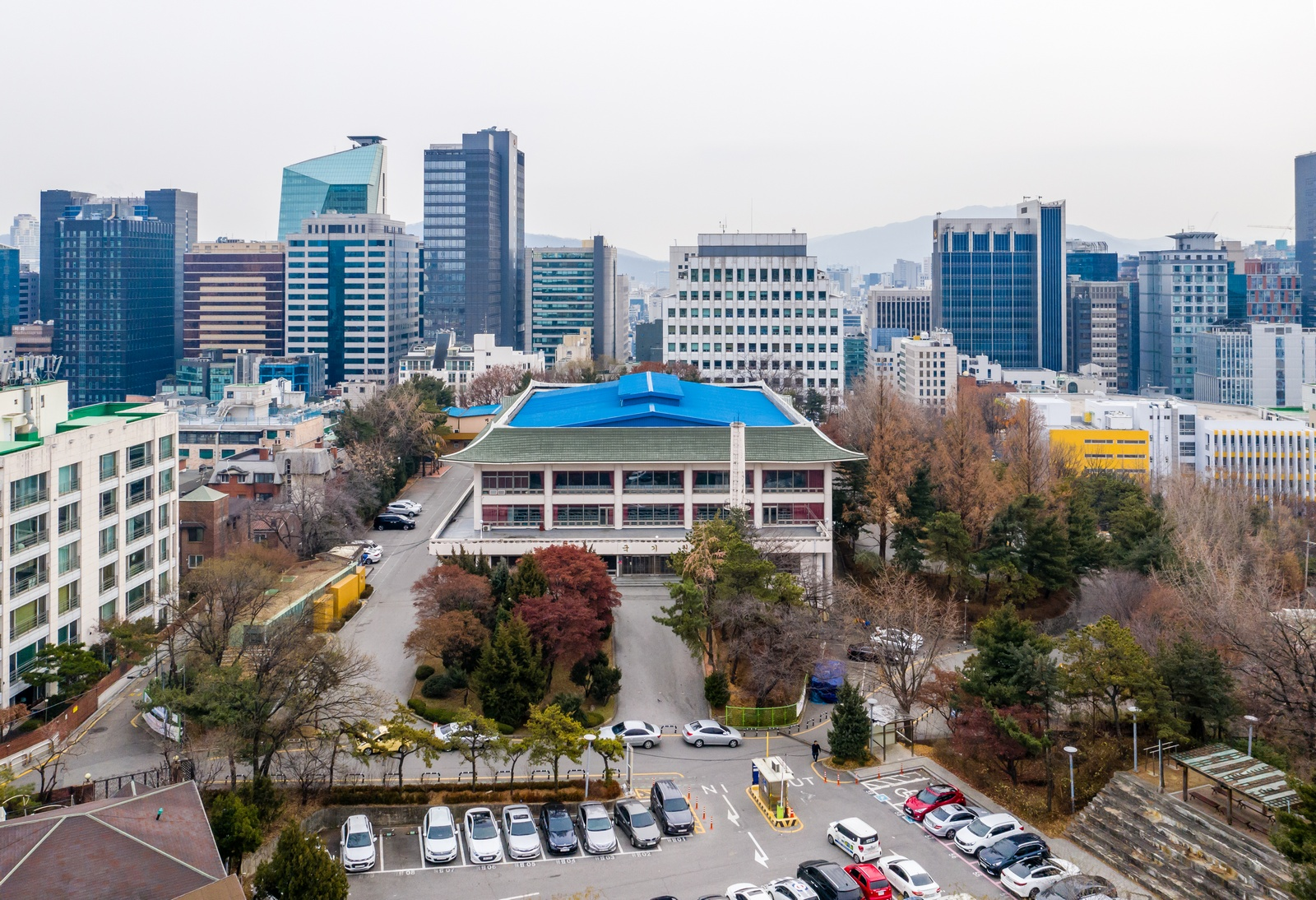
- Kukkiwon headquarters in Seoul
- Formation: 1972/1973
- Type: GO
- Location: 32 Teheran-ro 7-gil, Yeoksam-dong, Gangnam District, Seoul, South Korea
- Official language: Korean
- President: Ung Suk Yun
- Parent organization: Ministry of Culture, Sports and Tourism
- Website: www.kukkiwon.or.kr/

Kukkiwon (Korean: 국기원; Hanja: 國技院; lit. 'National Sport Headquarters'), also known as World Taekwondo Headquarters, is the central institution and the highest technical authority of Taekwondo. The institution is responsible for the regulation, development, and promotion of Taekwondo at both the national and international levels. Kukkiwon is also the headquarters of the World Taekwondo Academy (WTA) and the Taekwondo Research Institute. Among the Kukkiwon’s main functions are the training and certification of instructors, as well as the management and recognition of Dan ranks.

Kukkiwon works in cooperation with World Taekwondo (WT), to promote Taekwondo sparring competitions at the international and Olympic levels. Since 2010, the Kukkiwon has been officially recognized as a sports organization and operates under the supervision of the Ministry of Culture, Sports, and Tourism (MCST).

Kukkiwon is located at 32 Teheran-ro 7-gil, in the Yeoksam neighborhood of the Gangnam District in Seoul, South Korea. The building was initially used as the Korea Taekwondo Association’s (KTA) central training hall and was therefore known as the KTA Central Studio. Both the building and the organization were officially renamed “Kukkiwon” on February 6, 1973. In May 1973, the KTA and the Kukkiwon hosted the first World Taekwondo Championships, which were attended by 200 athletes from 17 countries. Since 1974, the Kukkiwon has maintained a permanent Taekwondo demonstration team. Since 1992, it has organized the annual World Taekwondo Hanmadang.

- Kukkiwon
- Hangul: 국기원
- Hanja: 國技院
- RR: Gukgiwon
- MR: Kukkiwŏn

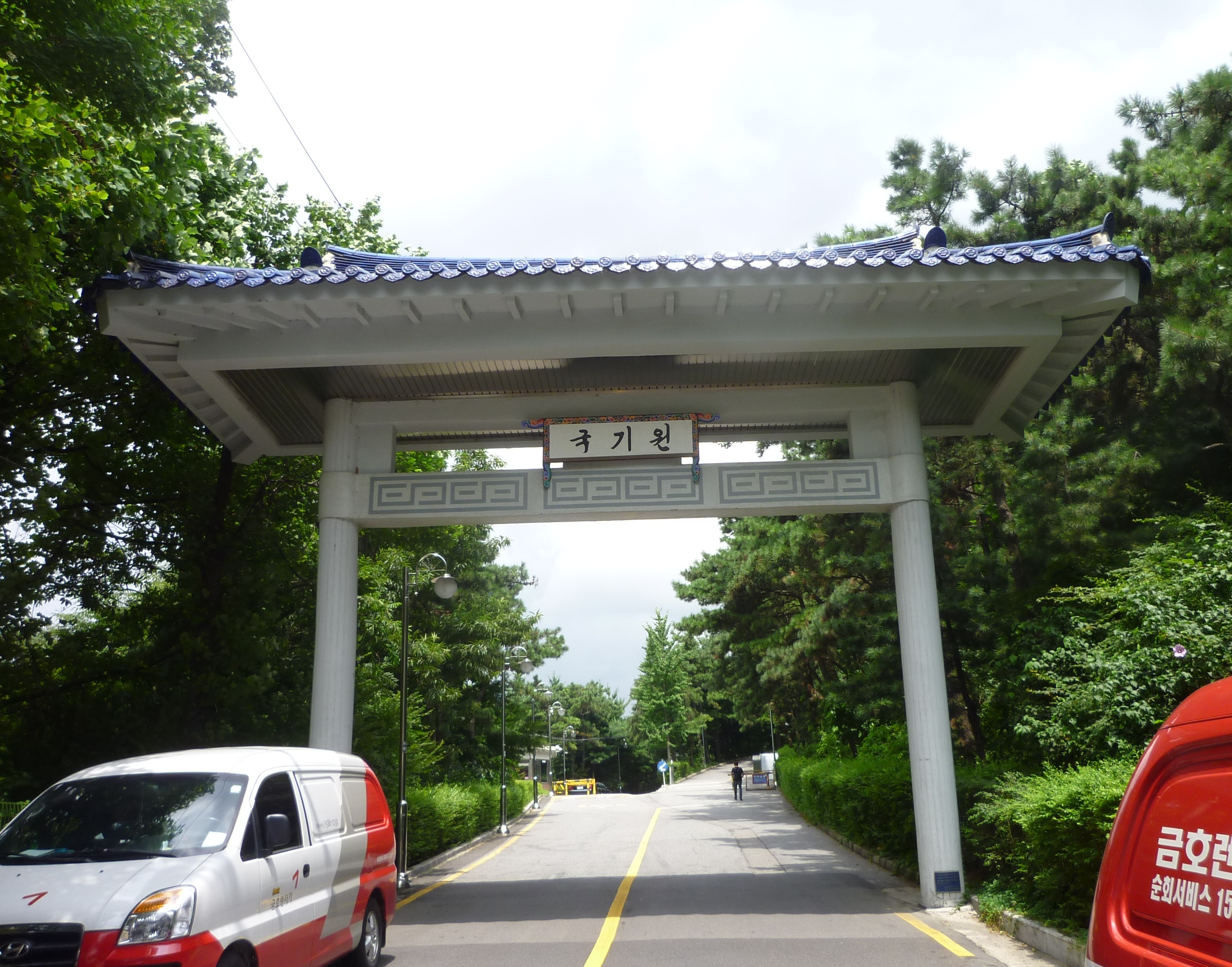
Entrance gates, 2010

== History ==
The Kukkiwon was originally established as the central training hall of the Korea Taekwondo Association (KTA), under the name KTA Central Dojang, with the aim of providing a meeting point for different martial arts styles practised in the kwan of post-war Korea. It was intended to become the birthplace of modern Taekwondo and the world's leading authority for defining its style and technical standards. Following its construction in 1972, it was also designated as the principal venue for dan promotion examinations, instructor training, competitions and, above all, the promotion and worldwide development of Taekwondo.

Over time, Kukkiwon acquired increasing importance, eventually becoming an independent organisation, separate from the KTA. In 2010, it was officially recognised as a sports organisation under the Ministry of Culture, Sports and Tourism of the South Korea.

== Events ==
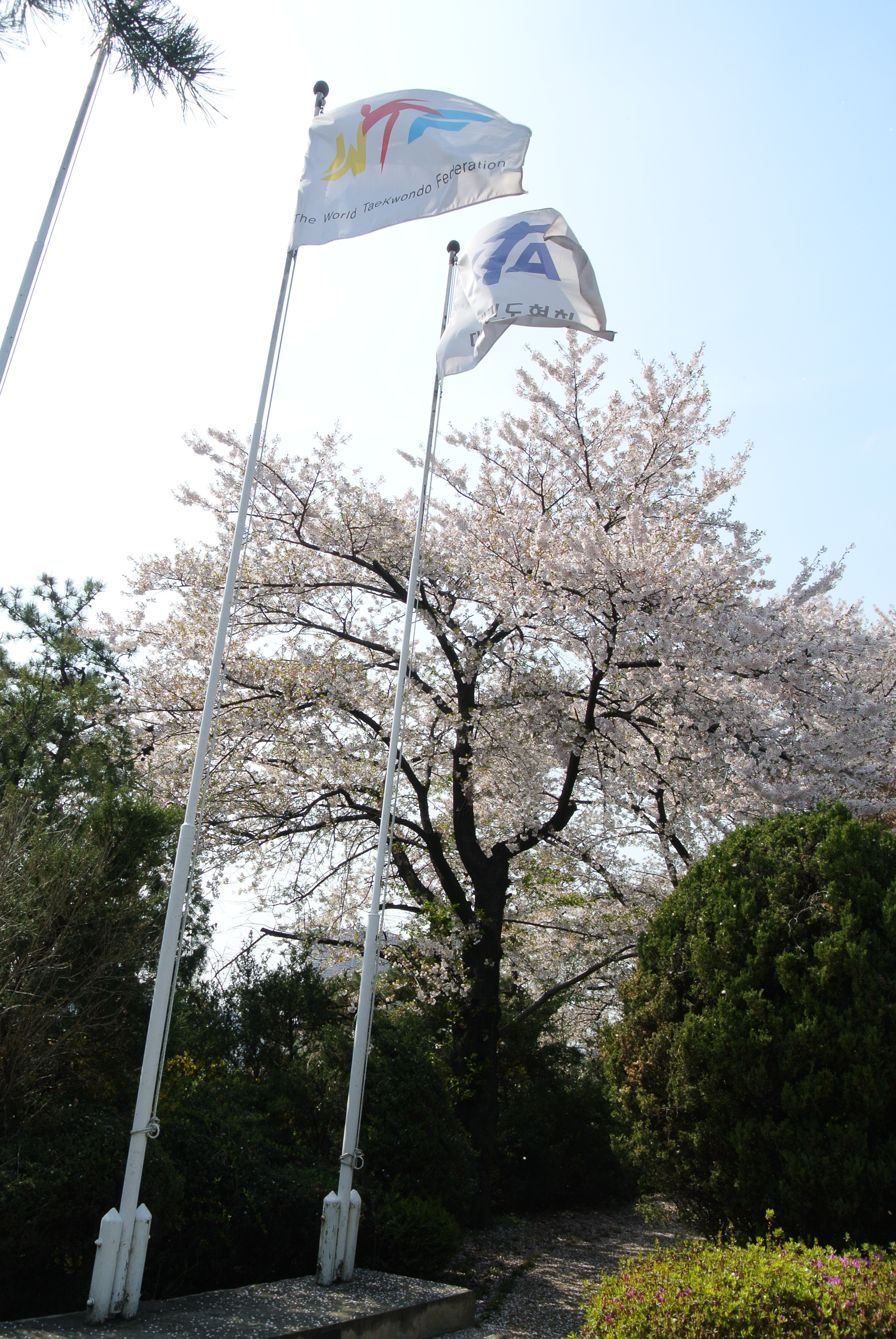
Flagpoles and flags of the World Taekwondo Federation (now World Taekwondo) and of the Korean Taekwondo Association at the Kukkiwon

Kukkiwon World Taekwondo Hanmadang (World Taekwondo Hanmadang) first held in 1992.

- No Year Period Place
- 1 1992 9th Dec.~11th Dec. The 2nd Olympic Gym
- 2 1993 9th Dec.~11th Dec. KBS 88 Gym
- 3 1994 26th Nov.~28th Nov. Jamsil Students Gym
- 4 1995 26th~28th Aug. KBS 88 Gym
- 5 1996 29th Nov.~1st Dec. KBS 88 Gym
- 6 1997 27th~30th Nov. Jamsil Students Gym
- 7 1998 31 Jul~2nd Aug. The 2nd Olympic Gym
- 8 1999 16th Dec. Kukkiwon
- 9 2000 13th~15th Dec. Kukkiwon
- 10 2001 13th~15th Nov. Kukkiwon
- 11 2003 26th~29th Nov. Kukkiwon
- 12 2004 4th~7th Nov. Kukkiwon
- 13 2005 1st~4th Nov. Kukkiwon
- 14 2006 1st~4th Nov. Muju County, Jellabukdo
- 15 2007 1st~4th Nov. Suwon, Gyeonggi
- 16 2008 16th~20th Jul. Anaheim, U.S.A
- 17 2009 12th~15th Aug. Dangjin ChoonNam
- 18 2010 8th~11th Dec. kukkiwon
- 19 2011 10th~13th Dec. Namyangju City, Physical Education Culture Center
- 20 2012 28th~31st Aug. kukkiwon
- 21 2013 28th~31st Aug. Daejeon Chung-Moo Sports Hall
- 22 2014 28th~31st Aug. Pohang Gymnagium
- 23 2015 30th Jul ~ 2nd Aug. Pyeong Taek Ichung Cultural
- 24 2016 3rd ~ 6th Aug. KUKKIWON
- 25 2017 29 July ~ 1st Aug AnYang Gymnasium
- 26 2018 28 July ~ 31 July Halla Gymnasium
- 27 2019 26 July ~ 30 July YongPyong-Dome
- 2020, 2021 and 2022 Not Held.
- 28 2023 Seongnam World Taekwondo Hanmadang Contest Outline 2023.05.21 15:26
- 29 2024 Mungyeong World Taekwondo Hanmadang Contest outline 2024.04.29 16:56
- 30 2025 Kukkiwon World Taekwondo Hanmadang Thursday, July 17 to Saturday, July 19

== See also ==
- Korean martial arts
- Sport in South Korea
