= Choi Jung Hwa =

South Korean Taekwon-Do practitioner

- Born: 20 May 1954 (age 72); Jeju Island, South Korea
- Other names: James Choi
- Style: Taekwon-Do
- Teacher: Choi Hong-hi
- Rank: 9th dan, Grand Master, Taekwon-Do (ITF)

Other information
- Website: Official site

Choi Jung Hwa (born 20 May 1954) is the only son of General Choi Hong-hi, who is regarded as the founder of the ITF martial art Taekwon-Do.

== International Taekwon-Do Federation ==
After his father's death he formed his own International Taekwon-Do Federation. Prior to forming his own Taekwon-Do organization he was a Vice Secretary of his father's ITF organization.

== Emigration to Canada and conviction ==
In 1971 Choi Jung Hwa emigrated to Canada. In 1983 Choi was convicted in Canada on charges that he conspired to assassinate the President of South Korea Chun Doo-Hwan. He was sentenced in Canada, and was barred from South Korea (this has since been rescinded). He was convicted in absentia, and travelled as a Taekwon-Do instructor in the then Eastern Bloc nations; mainly Yugoslavia and in the DPRK as well. It was not until several years later that he returned to Canada to finish his prison term.

In January 1987, General Choi appointed his son, Choi Jung Hwa, as Technical Director of the ITF Polen and as Vice-Chairman of the ITF Technical Committee. In 1989, Choi Jung Hwa was promoted to the rank of "Master Instructor" (7th Dan).

== New beginning ==
In January 1991, Master Choi Jung Hwa finally turned himself in to the Canadian authorities and faced accusations regarding the assassination attempt on President Chun Doo Hwan. In March 1991, it was reported that he had been sentenced to six years in prison. He was released after serving one year.

On May 11, 1996, he was awarded the 8th dan by the founder, Choi Hong Hi, in person.

At the 2001 ITF Congress, ITF Secretary-General Master Choi Jung Hwa was democratically elected President of the International Taekwon-Do Federation (ITF) for a six-year term. At his suggestion, General Choi was to serve for the first two years, with Master Choi Jung Hwa to hold the office for the remaining four years. However, this decision was soon reversed—both through a letter from General Choi in November 2001 and during an extraordinary session of the ITF Congress in Vienna in January 2002—and General Choi was requested to remain as President until the end of his term. Master Choi Jung Hwa and his ITF team rejected the resolution passed by the extraordinary congress in Vienna, maintaining their position that Master Choi Jung Hwa was the only legitimate ITF President.

On June 15, 2002, his father, General Choi Hong Hi, died in Pyongyang.

Following the death of Choi Hong-hi in 2002, the ITF (Vienna) split into two factions—the ITF led by Chang Ung and the ITF led by Russell MacLellan, while the founder’s son, Choi Jung Hwa, opened an office in Toronto and established ITF-Canada (now known as ITF Administration).

A conflict arose between the ITF Chang Ung group and the ITF Russell MacLellan group (the 2003 ITF Tran) regarding the headquarters in Vienna.

Ultimately, on October 30, 2007, the ITF Tran group officially registered as the "ITF" with the Ministry of the Interior in Madrid, Spain, with its headquarters located in Benidorm.

Thus, there are 3 ITF associations:

- ITF Vienna (Austria), formerly the North Korean ITF, initially under the leadership of Choi Hong Hi, and subsequently under the leadership of Chang Ung (born July 5, 1938 – died March 29, 2026). He served as president from September 22, 2002, to August 26, 2015. He was succeeded by Ri Yong-Son.
- ITF Canada—now known as ITF-Administration and led by Grandmaster Choi Jung Hwa, the son of General Choi—is based in the United Kingdom. This group focuses on bringing Taekwon-Do to disadvantaged countries.
- ITF Benidorm (Spain), formerly ITF Vienna – Due to disagreements between Chang Ung and Russell MacLellan, another ITF was founded on June 13, 2003, initially under the leadership of Grandmaster Tran Trieu Quan. On October 30, 2007, this ITF was officially registered with the Ministry of the Interior in Madrid, Spain. In 2010, Grandmaster Pablo Trajtenberg succeeded as president.

The 13th ITF World Championship, organized by ITF Canada in 2004, was historic, as it was the first to be officially held in South Korea. Prior to this, the ITF — which was originally founded in North Korea — had virtually no political presence there. The event marked a significant step toward fostering understanding between peoples.

Choi Jung Hwa works tirelessly to promote Taekwon-Do worldwide in its original and intended form. He has played a key role in the advancement and development of this martial art in numerous Eastern European countries—including Yugoslavia, Czechoslovakia, Romania, the former USSR, and the Democratic People's Republic of Korea — and has also initiated the introduction of Taekwon-Do in many African nations.

On April 10, 2005, Taekwon-Do celebrated its 50th anniversary. During the 50th-anniversary celebratory banquet in Atlantic City (USA), Choi Jung Hwa was officially elevated to the rank of Grandmaster (9th Dan). Master Robert Wheatley, chairman of the ITF Grading Committee, announced that the committee had awarded Choi Jung Hwa the rank of 9th Dan. However, Choi Jung Hwa has chosen not to use the title "Grandmaster," to which he would otherwise be entitled.

In the meantime, the ITF administration has begun to re-establish itself in South Korea—the birthplace of Choi Jung Hwa.

In 2015, Grandmaster Choi Jung Hwa was inducted in the Taekwon-Do Hall of Fame and in 2018, he was inducted as Legend of Taekwon-Do in the Australasian ITF Hall of Fame

Choi Jung Hwa traveled worldwide to conduct masterclasses and seminars, all the while preserving the technical and philosophical roots of Taekwon-Do.

On July 19, 2025, President and Grandmaster Choi Jung Hwa met in Seoul with President and Grandmaster Rick W. Shin,[30] head of the Professional Taekwon-Do Federation (PTF) and Kombat Taekwon-Do.[32] This meeting served as a powerful symbol of unity between two prominent figures in the global Taekwon-Do community.
