= Lee Soon-ho =

Lee Soon-ho or Lee Seon-ho may refer to:

- Lee Seon-ho, South Korean actor
- Lee Soon-ho (politician), South Korean politician
- Soon-ho Lee (martial artist), American martial artist

== See also ==
- Lee (Korean name)
