= Tran Trieu Quan =

Vietnamese Taekwondo practitioner

Trần Triệu Quân
- Born: March 26, 1952; Hanoi, Vietnam
- Died: January 12, 2010 (aged 57); Port-au-Prince, Haiti
- Style: Taekwon-Do
- Teachers: Kim Bong Sik, Choi Hong Hi
- Rank: 9th dan Taekwon-Do ITF

Other information
- Spouse: Nguyễn Thị Mỹ
- Children: Joliette Trần, Cécilia Trần, Nicolas Trần

Trần Triệu Quân (March 26, 1952 – January 12, 2010) was a Vietnamese-Canadian grandmaster of taekwondo and a professional engineer. He was president of one of the three International Taekwon-Do Federation groups from mid-2003 until his death. Trần held the rank of ninth dan black belt in taekwondo.

Trần was born on March 26, 1952, in Vietnam. He began his study of taekwondo from age 12. Trần attained black belt status by the age of 17, and was teaching taekwondo under his instructor, Kim Bong Sik. He emigrated to Canada in 1970, studying mechanical engineering at Laval University and establishing the first taekwondo schools in eastern Canada.

Apart from his extensive taekwondo activities, Trần operated Norbati Consultants Trần & Associates, a consulting firm specializing in building standards and project management for construction. In 1994, Trần was imprisoned in Vietnam after a one-million-dollar sale of cotton to a Vietnamese state company that he brokered fell through. He spent three years in prison.

Trần was promoted to seventh dan on July 1, 1990, eighth on December 3, 2000, and ninth on December 22, 2008. He was appointed president of one of the three ITF organizations on June 13, 2003.

Trần was in Port-au-Prince, Haiti, on business (ironically, working on improving building standards to withstand earthquakes and hurricanes), and was staying at the Hôtel Montana when it collapsed in a 7.0 magnitude earthquake on January 12, 2010. Upon Trần's disappearance, ITF Senior Vice-President and Grand Master Pablo Trajtenberg was named Acting President of the ITF group that Trần had led. Trần's remains were found and his death was confirmed on February 12, 2010.

Trần was married to Nguyễn Thị Mỹ. They had two daughters and a son—Joliette, Cécilia, and Nicolas—all holders of black belts in taekwondo. Apart from his wife and children, Trần left behind son-in-law François Beaudin; grandchildren Jasmine and Sandrine; and brothers Triệu Cung and Triệu Lân.

== See also ==
- List of taekwondo grandmasters
