= Soon-ho Lee (martial artist) =

American taekwondo practitioner

- Hangul: 이순호
- RR: I Sunho
- MR: I Sunho

Soon-ho Lee is the Grand Master Emeritus of Songahm Taekwondo, the American Taekwondo Association. He was given the title at ATA's World Championships in June 2002, succeeding his brother Haeng-ung Lee.

In 1969, Soon-ho Lee joined his elder brother in the United States. His goal was to expand his academic opportunities, at the time he did not intend to become a Taekwondo instructor. In June 2011, at the world championships in Little Rock, Arkansas, he gave up his title of presiding grand master, and In Ho Lee became the new presiding grand master. He currently holds the title of Grand Master Emeritus and was the first in the ATA to hold the title. He has the 2nd longest continuous reign as 'Presiding' Grand Master, second only to Eternal Grand Master Haeng Ung Lee. He is the only Grand Master in ATA history to hold the title of 'Presiding' Grand Master in two different time frames. The first being from 2001-2011 when he stepped down passing the title to In Ho Lee, and the second being from 2021-2022 during a transitional period from when Grand Master G.K. Lee left the organization in 2021 to when current 'Presiding' Grand Master M.K. Lee took over the title in 2022. He has since retired from all official administrative duties and sits as a Grand Master Emeritus serving as a guide to the future of the ATA. He will also make appearances at sanctioned ATA National & World events, such as ATA Spring & Fall Nationals and ATA World Championships (Tournament of Champions & Super 20).
