= Distancing (disambiguation) =

Distancing may refer to:

- Distancing, a martial arts term describing the proper placement of one's self with respect to an opponent.
- Distancing (psychology), a technique used in psychological therapy and special education to encourage the early stages of cognition, particularly identity and the separation of one's self from other objects.
- "Distancing", a song by Cloud Wan from The Cloud, 2022
- Distancing effect, a technique used in theatre and film
