= Roy Kurban =

American taekwondo grandmaster

Roy D. Kurban
- Born: United States
- Nationality: United States
- Height: 6 ft 2 in (188 cm)
- Style: Karate, Taekwondo
- Trainer: Allen Steen, Larry Caster, Skipper Mullins, Jerry Wiseman, Phillip Ola, Dennis Dorris, Ed Johnson, Won Chik Park, Jin-Song Chung
- Rank: 9th dan in Taekwondo (grandmaster), 10th dan in Karate

Amateur record
- Total: 127
- Wins: 127

Other information
- Occupation: Retired Judge (Justice of the Peace) Tarrant County Precinct 7. Currently a Chief at the Tarrant County Sheriff Department under Sheriff Bill Waybourn
- University: Texas Christian University Dallas Baptist University
- Spouse: Janette
- Notable school: Strawn Martial Arts Academy
- Website: roydkurban.com
- Last updated on: 23 September 24

Roy D. Kurban is a 9th degree American Taekwondo martial arts grandmaster and former Karate national competitor. He lives in Texas.

== Biography ==
Roy Kurban began martial arts training in 1965, studying Karate under Allen Steen, Larry Caster, Skipper Mullins, Jerry Wiseman, Phillip Ola, and Dennis Dorris. He also trained in Isshin-ryū Karate with Ed Johnson. He earned his first degree black belt in 1968 in Dallas, Texas. As a member of the United States 8th Army in stationed in Seoul, Korea in 1970, he trained for a full year under Won Chik Park. While there, he took first place in the Yong San All-American TKD Championship in Seoul, Korea.

During the 1970s, he was a formidable competitor, winning 127 national and international competitions, including 80 first-place trophies and grand championships. He was ranked among the top seven U.S. fighters of the decade by Black Belt Magazine. In 1973, Kurban established his own martial school, the American Black Belt Academy, in Arlington, Texas. That same year, he was voted "Best All-around Karate Man in the U.S." by Professional Karate Magazine. It was during this time that he introduced Jin-Song Chung to the United States, a former champion competitor and instructor whom he had met in South Korea during his Army enlistment. (Chung later opened his own martial arts school in North Dallas and went on to become a grandmaster.)

During the 1980s, he made a name for himself as a peace officer instructor throughout the North Texas region, and established an accredited Taekwondo course for the physical education department of the University of Texas at Arlington in 1982, which is still operational. From 1991 to 2006, Kurban served as Justice of the Peace in North Texas.

He is one of the few Americans to receive a Master Instructor certification from the World Taekwondo Federation. He remains active in the Texas martial arts community, conducting seminars and hosting competitions. .

== Rank promotions ==
Kurban earned the following black belts in Karate and Taekwondo:

- 1968 — 1st degree in Dallas, Texas
- 1970 — 2nd degree at the Jidokwan headquarters in Seoul, Korea
- 1972 — 3rd degree in Dallas, Texas from Allen Steen
- 1975 — 4th degree in Odessa, Texas from Hee Deok Park, through the Korea Moo Duk Kwan Association
- 1980 — 5th degree and Master Instructor Certificate in Fort Worth, Texas from the World Taekwondo Federation, under Grandmaster Won Chik Park
- 1986 — 6th degree from the World Taekwondo Federation and Ji Do Kwan Association, under Grandmaster Won Chik Park
- 1986 — 6th degree certification in Chung Do Kwan Taekwondo in Arlington, Texas under Larry Caster
- 1994 — 7th degree from Grandmaster Won Chik Park through the Ji Do Kwan and World Taekwondo Federation
- 2005 — 8th degree and title of "Grandmaster" by Grandmaster Won Chik Park, president of the United States Taekwondo Grandmaster Society (USTGS)
- 2014 — 9th degree from Grandmaster Won Chik Park, president of the United States Taekwondo Grandmaster Society (USTGS)

== Awards ==
- Ambassador of Taekwondo Award, 2010, U.S. Taekwondo Grandmasters Society (USTGS)

== Published works ==
- Roy Kurban (August 1979). Kicking Techniques for Competition and Self-Defense.
- Roy Kurban; et al. (2003). New Gladiators.
- Roy Kurban. Practical Kicking Techniques.
- Roy Kurban (June 2010). "Who Else Remembers Grandmaster Allen Steen, The Father Of Texas 'Blood And Guts' Taekwondo Karate?".
- Melinda Folse Kaitcer (April 2010). Grandmaster. The Kaitcer Group LLC. ISBN 978-0982696002., a memoir of Won Chik Park (introduction by Roy D. Kurban).
