= Fallnationals =

Fallnationals (also styled Fall Nationals or FallNationals) may refer to:

- NHRA Fall Nationals; see National Hot Rod Association
- ABA Fall Nationals; see American Bicycle Association
- ATA Fall Nationals; see American Taekwondo Association
