= Skipper Mullins =

American martial artist

Lewis Ray "Skipper" Mullins
- Born: 25 April 1946; Dallas, Texas
- Died: 15 May 2020 (aged 74)
- Nationality: American
- Height: 5 ft 7 in (1.70 m)
- Weight: 150 lb (68 kg; 11 st)
- Style: Tae Kwon Do
- Teachers: Allen Steen, Jhoon Rhee
- Rank: 10th degree black belt in Taekwondo

Other information
- Notable students: Roy Kurban
- Website: http://skippermullins.net

Lewis Ray "Skipper" Mullins (April 25, 1946 - May 15, 2020) was an American martial arts fighter who has been described as "the greatest kicker in the history of the U.S. karate scene".

== Biography ==
Mullins was born and raised in Dallas, Texas. He began training in Taekwondo in October 1963, under Texas-based martial arts instructor Allen Steen at the Red Bird National Guard Armory. In April 1966, Mullins was promoted to 1st degree black belt by Steen.

In November 1965, Mullins enlisted in the U.S. Marine Corps. After finishing his basic training he was sent to Marine Corps Base Quantico in Quantico, Virginia, where his MOS was that of a pay and separation clerk. Mullins would teach martial arts to fellow marines and FBI candidates from the FBI Academy also located in Quantico. During this time Mullins would begin training under his instructor Allen Steen's instructor Jhoon Rhee who had schools in nearby Washington D.C.

In 1968, he became the vice president of Steen's Texas Karate Institute. He was a founding member and director of the Southwest Karate Black Belt Association, later renamed the American Karate Black Belt Association.

He has won seven world titles with a record of 1100 won fights and around 15 loses, and was inducted on April 6, 2007 into the Taekwondo Hall of Fame. Mullins was defeated several times by his close friend Chuck Norris throughout 1965, 1966, and 1967. In 1967, Black Belt Magazine recognized Mullins as one of the top 10 fighters in the U.S.

== Personal ==
Mullins was a retired firefighter captain with the Dallas Fire Department, having worked for the department for 36 years.<ref name="Skipper"
