= Allen Steen =

American martial artist

Allen R. Steen
- Born: Texas
- Nationality: (United States) American
- Style: Taekwondo
- Teacher: Jhoon Rhee
- Rank: 10th degree black belt in Taekwondo

Other information
- Notable students: Skipper Mullins, Roy Kurban
- Website: http://AllenSteen.com

Allen R. Steen (1940-2025) was an American martial arts practitioner, teacher, and promoter. He was taught by Jhoon Rhee, the "Father of American Taekwondo", and was the first of Rhee's American students to reach black belt standing.

== Background ==
Steen had attended one of Rhee's martial arts demonstrations in the fall of 1959. Steen had prior done little boxing and being impressed with Rhee's skills, wanted to learn Rhee's style of Karate. (Note: At the time, "traditional/pre-KTA Taekwondo" was referred to as "Korean Karate.") Steen was a business student at the University of Texas when he began studying under Jhoon Rhee in 1959. During his studies, his money was limited and could only afford his University education and martial arts studies.

He achieved his black belt in 1962. Following Rhee's departure from Texas, Steen set up the "Jhoon Rhee Institute of Karate", his first Karate school, in Dallas. Over time, Steen would establish other Karate schools and would grow into a network of schools throughout the Texas state. Some of these schools go by the names like "Texas Karate Institute" or "Allen St".

In 1964, Steen founded the Southwest Karate Black Belt Association, which in 1972 became the American Karate Black Belt Association.

On July 31, 1966, Steen won the Long Beach International Karate Championships, in the process defeating both Chuck Norris and Joe Lewis.

In 1967 Steen retired from Karate competition. Following his retirement from competition, Steen remained active as promoter of the Karate. He and long-time friend, J. Pat Burleson, formally broke away from Rhee for commercial independence and financial control. In so doing, they turned Texas into the most powerful, self-sustaining hub of independent commercial karate in America.

On April 14–16, 2000, Steen hosted the "Allen Steen Event Millennium Karate 2000", which was one of the largest Karate events at that time.

Steen died at the age of 85 on December 30, 2025.

== Legacy ==
Allen Steen is regarded as one of the most influential martial artists from United States. Steen has been inducted into American Karate Black Belt Association Hall of Fame.

Of the original 184 students that enrolled under Jhoon Rhee in 1959, Steen was one of the only six to achieve a black belt.

Steen has reputation as the "Father of Blood-N-Guts Karate", which refers to a style of Karate that flourished in Texas during 1960s. The moniker stems from Steen's rigorous training methods, discipline and requirement of toughness from the Texas students. Steen's methods were inspired by his master, Jhoon Rhee, who also ran a very tough training regimen.

Under Allen Steen instruction, he produced some of the most successful Karate sportsmen of the era.

Steen was inducted into the Taekwondo Hall of Fame in 2007.

== Achievements ==
- 1963 Chicago World Karate Tournament
  - Free Sparring, 2nd Place
- 1964 First Southwest Karate Championships
  - Brown Belt Kata - 2nd Place
  - Team Freestyle Kumite - 1st Place, as part of Jhoon Rhee Institute team.
