= In-ho Lee =

South Korean taekwondo practitioner

In-ho Lee (born 1955) is the third and previous Presiding Grandmaster of Songahm Taekwondo, the American Taekwondo Association.

In-ho Lee was born in Seoul, South Korea, two years after the end of the Korean War. He began to study taekwondo as a boy.

In 1976, following a year of military service, he joined the taekwondo studio of his brother, Haeng-ung Lee Songahm Taekwondo, in the United States. He became known for his jump round kick and lightning speed.

In-ho Lee was inaugurated during the 2011 Songahm Taekwondo World Championships' - Inaugural Ceremony on Saturday, June 25, 2011, in North Little Rock, Arkansas. He currently holds the title of Grand Master Emeritus. He also serves on the ATA's Founders Council. He held the title of 'Presiding' Grand Master for a total of 8 years from 2011-2019. He has had the 3rd longest continuous reign as 'Presiding' Grandmaster, among the five of them who have held the title.

In-ho Lee was succeeded by Presiding Grandmaster G.K. Lee on June 14, 2019, in North Little Rock, Arkansas.
