= Jhoon Rhee =

Korean-American taekwondo grandmaster (1932–2018)

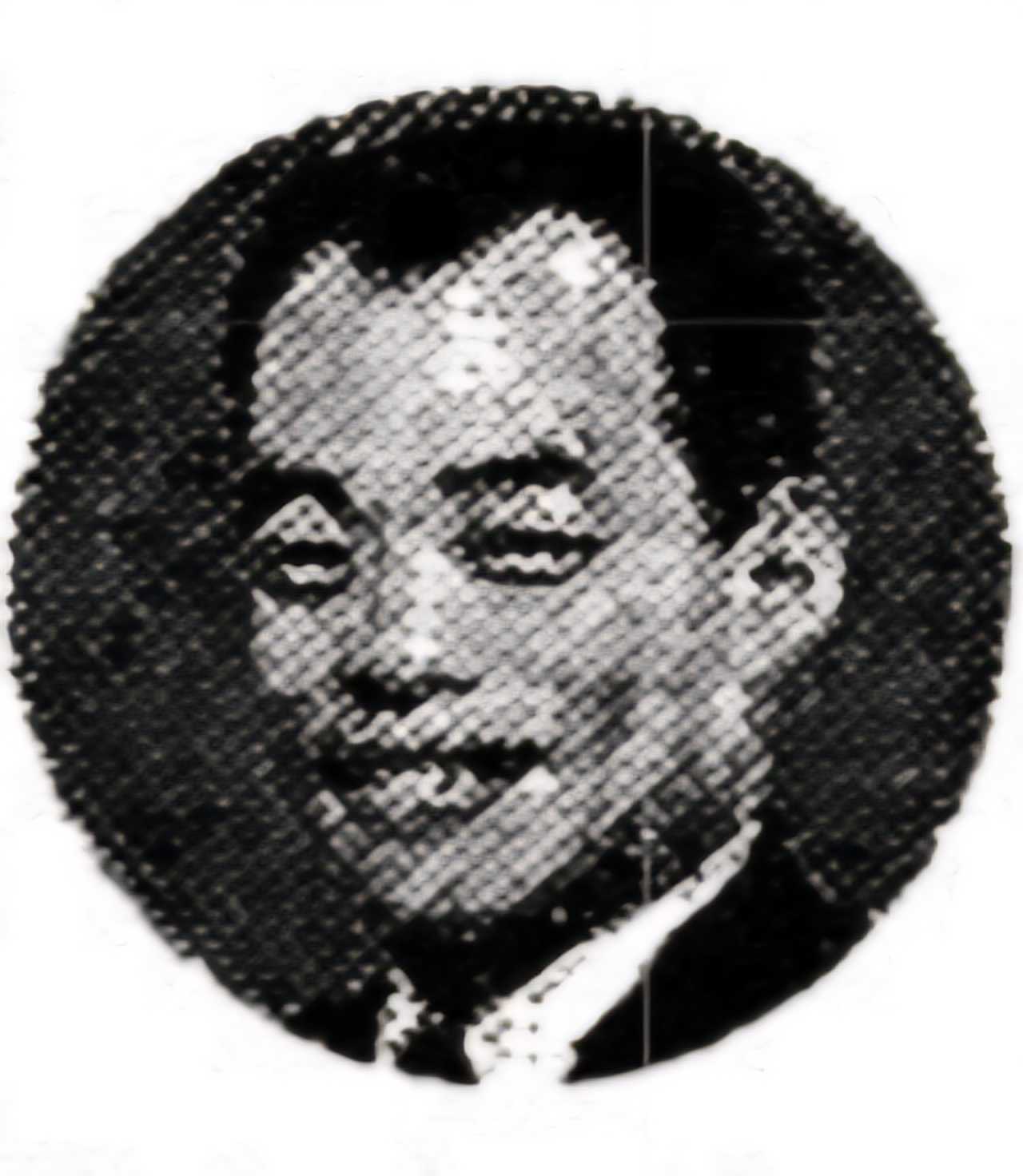
- Born: January 7, 1932; Asan, Chūseinan-dō, Chōsen (present-day Asan, South Chungcheong Province, South Korea)
- Died: April 30, 2018 (aged 86); Arlington, Virginia, U.S.
- Other names: Rhee Jhoon-goo
- Style: Taekwondo, Jhoon-Rhee-style (founder); Taekwondo (ITF-Style), Tang Soo Do (Chung Do Kwan), Jun Fan Gung Fu (Note: Bruce Lee's system before 1967 / founding Jeet Kune Do.)
- Teachers: Nam Tae Hi, Bruce Lee (Note: By exchange of martial arts knowledge)
- Rank: 10th dan taekwondo (posthumously)

Other information
- Notable students: Allen R. Steen, Rodney Batiste, Marina Kim, John Chung, Bruce Lee, Muhammad Ali
- Website: jhoonrheetkd.com

Korean name
- Hangul: 이준구
- Hanja: 李俊九
- RR: I Jungu
- MR: I Chun'gu

Rhee Jhoon-goo (Korean: 이준구; January 7, 1932 – April 30, 2018), commonly known as Jhoon Rhee, was a Korean-American taekwondo practitioner. He was widely recognized as the "father of American taekwondo" for introducing the Korean martial art to the United States when he immigrated in the 1950s. He was a 10th-degree black belt and held the title of grandmaster.

== Early life and education ==
Rhee was born on January 7, 1932, in Asan, Chōsen (present-day South Korea). He began training in the martial arts at age 13 in 1945 without his father's knowledge. Rhee received martial arts training from Nam Tae-hi and graduated from the Chung Do Kwan school. While an officer in South Korean Army, he went to the U.S. to attend Southwest Texas State College in 1956, and later returned to attend Texas to attend the University of Texas-Austin for an engineering degree. He later became a naturalized American citizen.

== Career ==
During the 1960s, Rhee befriended Bruce Lee—a relationship from which they both benefited as martial artists. Lee taught Rhee an extraordinarily fast punch considered almost impossible to block, something Rhee named the "accupunch". During his study in Texas, Rhee issued his first U.S.-awarded black belt to Pat Burleson and his first fully U.S.-trained student was Allen Steen, both of whom teamed up to set up the influential Southwest Black Belt Association (later the American Black Belt Association), resulting in many champions. Upon graduation from college, Rhee relocated to the East Coast and opened his first studio in the U.S. in 1962 in Washington, D.C., and over time expanded to 11 studios in the DC Metro area.

In 1973, Rhee had his only starring film role, in Hong Kong's When Taekwondo Strikes; he also had a small uncredited role with Bruce Lee in Fist of Fury.

In 1975, he met Muhammad Ali before the latter's Thrilla in Manila fight with Joe Frazier. Rhee demonstrated the accupunch to Ali, who was unable to block it and asked to be taught it. Rhee was Ali's head coach for the boxer's fights with Richard Dunn and Antonio Inoki.

In the mid-1980s, Rhee operated a network of 11 martial arts studios across the Washington, D.C., region. Rhee was well known in the D.C. area for a television commercial with a jingle by Nils Lofgren and Rhee's daughter uttering the catchphrase "Nobody bothers me," followed by his son saying "Nobody bothers me, either" and winking. In 2000, Rhee was the only Korean-American ranked among the 203 most recognized immigrants to the country by the National Immigrant Forum and Immigration and Naturalization Services.

Rhee was inducted into the Taekwondo Hall of Fame in 2007, in which he is listed as a pioneer of taekwondo both in the U.S. and Russia. Rhee is on Chang Keun Choi's list of taekwondo pioneers.

== Death ==
Rhee died on April 30, 2018, in Arlington, Virginia, at age 86.

== See also ==
- List of taekwondo grandmasters
