= Chang Ung =

North Korean sports administrator (1938–2026)

- 장웅
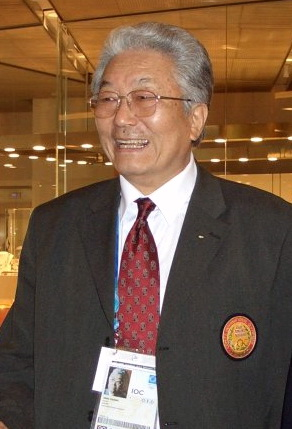
- Chang in 2007

Honorary Life President of the ITF
- In office 26 August 2015 – 29 March 2026
- Preceded by: Position established

President of the ITF
- In office 22 September 2002 – 26 August 2015
- Preceded by: Choi Hong Hi
- Succeeded by: Ri Yong-son

Personal details
- Born: 5 July 1938 Heijō, Korea, Japan (now Pyongyang, North Korea)
- Died: 29 March 2026 (aged 87)
- Occupation: Sports administrator

Chang Ung (Korean: 장웅, 5 July 1938 – 29 March 2026) was a North Korean sports administrator and athlete. He was the honorary life president of the International Taekwon-Do Federation, having previously served as its President from 2002 to 2015 following the death of General Choi Hong Hi from stomach cancer on 15 June 2002. Chang previously served as a member of the International Olympic Committee representing North Korea, and later served as an honorary member of the IOC.

== Death of General Choi and ascension to ITF presidency ==
On 22 September 2002, 70 representatives from 46 countries attended a memorial service for General Choi Hong Hi. The solemn and memorable service was held in Pyongyang, North Korea. Choi Hong Hi spoke to a select group of ITF officials and high-level instructors on his deathbed at Pyongyang Hospital. It was recorded that there might be no misinterpretation of his intentions regarding the future of the ITF. The following is an excerpt:

You probably might know Mr. Chang Ung well. It is time to introduce Mr. Chang Ung proudly in public. Please carry on propaganda that Mr. Chang Ung is the tallest and in the highest position in the ITF. If only I had been as tall as Mr. Chang Ung, I could have had less opponents, however, as my body was so tiny that there were many opponents. Thus, all alone, I could not but fight against them for so long. But I have never been worn out for the justice was on my side. I have always worried about a successor to the President, however, my mind is set at ease for there is Mr. Chang Ung.

These last words were witnessed by: Mr. Rhee Ki Ha, Grand Master and former Vice-President of the ITF; Mr. Tom MacCallum, Master and the Secretary General; Mr. Leong Wei Meng, Master and the Chairman of the Consultative Committee; Mr. Kwang Sung Hwang, Grand Master, spokesman and special aide; Mr. Park Jong Soo, Grand Master and a member of the Consultative Council; Mr. Hwang Jin, Master and a member of the Consultative Council; Mr. Hwang Bong Yong, Chairman of the Korean Taekwon-Do Committee; Mr. Jong Jae Hun, Secretary General of the International Martial Art Games Committee and Mr. Rang Bong Man, Secretary General of the Korean Taekwon-Do Committee.

A special Congress of the ITF and memorial was held at the People's Palace of Culture in Pyongyang on September 22, 2002, after Choi's death. It was here that Presidents and representatives from 46 national Taekwon-Do federations unanimously elected Mr. Chang Ung, member of the International Olympic Committee, as president of the ITF. He was re-elected as president on October 13, 2009.

== Legitimacy as ITF President ==
=== Senior Grandmaster Phap Lu's Open Email ===
Senior Master Phap Lu stated on October 22, 2002, in an Open email to Taekwon-Doists that,
"General Choi did not speak his last words with the constitution in mind. He spoke as a CREATOR of the art. When he was alive what he said was law, in death are his words are no longer valid?"

It is here that he explains the background behind General Choi's reason for choosing Chang Ung as a successor.

"That was why General Choi handpicked Mr. Russell MacLellan as the Senior Vice-president to fulfill the role as acting President if anything happened to General Choi. At this time Mr. Chang Ung’s name was never mentioned. Our beloved Founder still waited for his son to visit him at the hospital in Pyongyang, but his last hope TOTALLY vanished when the nine people visited Gen. Choi without his son’s presence in mid of June 2002 after the International Gen. Choi’s Cup in Ottawa, Canada...Since February 2002 there has been a recent rapid change in the political situation in both KOREAs. After General Choi was admitted to the hospital in North Korea, General Choi saw the light of unification in both TAEKWON-DO and North and South KOREAs. With Mr. Chang Ung’s I.O.C. experience, knowledge and talents, as well as his relationship with Mr. Ung Yong Kim, his various meetings with both North and South Koreans TaeKwon-Do Committees members, General Choi Hong Hi, handpicked Mr. Chang Ung as his successor before his departure. The sudden appearance of Mr. Chang Ung surprised much of the PRESENT CORE ITF MEMBERS as he was never spoken of by General Choi."
"Our beloved Founder General Choi Hong Hi DID NOT PICK Mr. Chang Ung in favor of North Korea, but he picked him up as successor because OF THE PRESENT POLITICAL CLIMATE as well as his leadership qualities. This was the BRILLIANT FUTURE VISION of our beloved Founder and Father. If you were Mr. Chang Ung I believe that regardless of whether you were a Canadian, Italian, Korean or Argentinian you would be picked too. THAT IS OUR GENERAL CHOI, everything fits for Taekwon-Do. If it fits he would use it, because he believed that these were gifts from Heaven to him. Gen. Choi used to tell us that his Parents gave his name CHOI HONG HI and HEAVEN gave his name TAEKWON-DO. He was even afraid that nobody would know what Taekwon-do would be, he asked people to cover his coffin with the words TAEKWON-DO. I believe that whatever the outcome will be: IT IS THE LAST WISHES OF GENERAL CHOI HONG HI. We at least own him for these."'

People in the ITF see it as a great honor to meet him in person.

=== Regarding the Legal Status of Chang Ung's ITF ===
Shortly after Chang's ascension to the ITF presidency, the legality of the organization was put into question. However, these issues have since been resolved.

- The ITF was registered to the Austrian Police in 1986. This has been renewed in January 2003, September 2004, 30 May 2007, 23 February 2009 and renewed 30 November 2009, pursuant to the law of Austria.
- The ITF was recognized as the International Sports Organization by the Austrian Sports Federation and printed on the “Year Book” of Sports for 2004/2005 and for 2005/2006 as the sole International Sports Organization of which Secretariat has been located in Vienna, Austria (see page 292 on “Year Book” for 2004/2005).
- The ITF was registered to the Finance Ministry of Austria as Non-Profit-Civilian Organization in November 2004.
- The ITF became a Signatory Federation to World Anti-Doping Agency (WADA) in July 2010.

In 2009, Mrs. Choi Chun Hi, widow of General Choi Hong Hi spoke at the 19th ITF Congress in St. Petersburg, Russia. She stated, "I wish you would support Prof. and Dr. Chang Ung, and be with him with one mind and one will for the brighter future of the ITF".

Chang was also the president of International Martial Art Games Committee. Chang has been an advocate for Asia's third Winter Games, stating that it would help the development of winter sports in the region which are "still far behind" Europe and North America.

In 2015, Chang resigned and was replaced by Ri Yong-son as the President of ITF.

At the end of 2018 Ung ceased to be a member of the IOC retiring as per protocol after turning 80.

== Death ==
Chang died on 29 March 2026, at the age of 87.
