= ATA Martial Arts =

American Taekwondo Association

American Taekwondo Association
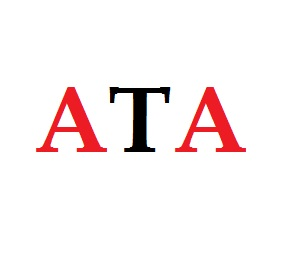
- Type: Private
- Industry: Martial Arts/ Fitness Organization
- Genre: Licensor
- Founded: 1969, Omaha, Nebraska
- Founder: Haeng Ung Lee
- Headquarters: 1800 Riverfront Drive, Little Rock, Arkansas 72202, Little Rock, Arkansas, United States
- Number of locations: over 2,000
- Area served: North America, South America, Europe, Saudi Arabia, India, Nepal, South Africa, South Korea, & Guam
- Key people: Presiding Grand Master M.K. Lee; Grand Master Emeritus Soon Ho Lee; Grand Master In Ho Lee; Grand Master William Clark; Grand Master Robert Allemier
- Services: Martial Arts instructional
- Website: www.atamartialarts.com

ATA Martial Arts, formerly known as the American Taekwondo Association (ATA), was founded in 1969 in Omaha, Nebraska, by Haeng Ung Lee of South Korea.

ATA Martial Arts has been headquartered in Little Rock, Arkansas, since 1977, and presided over by M.K. Lee since July 2022.

With over 300,000 active members in over 21 countries —800 schools and 120,000 members in the United States alone—it is one of the largest taekwondo organizations in the world.

== History ==
Founder Haeng Ung Lee received his first degree black belt in 1954 and began teaching taekwondo to Korean army members. He then opened a school near a U.S. Air Force base near Seoul and began teaching American servicemen, including an officer named Richard Reed. The two met in 1961 and Reed would inspire Lee to move to Omaha, Nebraska and open his first U.S. taekwondo school a year later.

The American Taekwondo Association was formed in 1969, and its permanent headquarters was established in Little Rock, Arkansas, in 1977. The first World Championships tournament was begun in 1990, where H.U. Lee was the first to receive the title of Grand Master.

To "serve as a memorial to [his] work, dedication and commitment," the H.U. Lee International Gate and Garden was erected in 2009 in front of ATA headquarters.

== Songahm Taekwondo ==
Songahm Taekwondo is the style of martial arts practiced at ATA affiliated schools. Songahm means "Pine Tree and Rock." According to the organization, the term Songahm itself represents "Evergreen strength the year round, long life and a symbol of unchanging human loyalty" as represented by the pine tree and the rock. Soon Ho Lee gave the name, Songahm, and its meaning to his brother, Haeng Ung Lee years before H.U. Lee founded the ATA. In the ATA, the student is compared to a growing pine tree, from a seed (white belt) to a massive tree (black belt).

According to the ATA, practitioners of Songahm Taekwondo study poome sae (forms, a preset combination of offensive and defensive techniques, designed to simulate self-defense techniques being used upon multiple opponents), gyeo-roo-gi (sparring), one-steps (scripted sparring segments), self-defense, board breaking, weapons, and leadership. The ATA has a legacy program that allows students to work as leaders and instructors in junior classes. This helps the trainee instructors become qualified taekwondo instructors and earn the ATA title of Certified Instructor.

== Belt and rank system ==
=== List of belts ===
ATA Martial Arts uses a rank system divided into two series: the colored belt series, and the black belt series. Each series has nine ranks, the purpose of which are to establish a chain of command and measurement of student progress. The increased number of smaller goals provided by nine levels of colored belt rank was designed for added motivation by giving many short term goals to achieve and eliminating having to remain in a single color for several months at a time.

According to the ATA, each belt has a symbolic meaning that compares the student's growth in taekwondo to the growth of a pine tree:

==== Color belts ====
- White Belt (Songahm 1) - "Pure and without the knowledge of Songahm Taekwondo. As with the Pine Tree, the seed must now be planted and nourished to develop strong roots."
- Orange Belt (Songahm 2) - "The sun is beginning to rise. As with the morning's dawn, only the beauty of the sunrise is seen rather than the immense power."
- Yellow Belt (Songahm 3) - "The seed is beginning to see the sunlight."
- Camouflage Belt (Songahm 4) - "The sapling is hidden amongst the taller pines and must now fight its way upwards."
- Green Belt (Songahm 5) - "The pine tree is beginning to develop and grow in strength."
- Purple Belt (Inwha 1) - "Coming to the mountain. The tree is in mid-growth and now the path becomes steep."
- Blue Belt (Inwha 2) - "The tree reaches for the sky towards new heights."
- Brown Belt (Choong Jung 1) - "The tree is firmly rooted in the earth."
- Red Belt (Choong Jung 2) - "The sun is setting. The first phase of growth has been accomplished."

==== Black belts ====
- 1st Degree Black Belt Recommended (half red and half black in appearance) - "The dawn of a new day. The sun breaks through the darkness."
- 1st Degree Black Belt (Shim Jun) - "The tree has reached maturity and has overcome the darkness. It must now begin to 'plant seeds for the future.'"
- 2nd Degree Black Belt (Jung Yul) - "With your noble character, you will develop a new permanence in life."
- 3rd Degree Black Belt (Chung San) - "Peace of mind and tranquility."
- 4th Degree Black Belt (Sok Bong) - "Crest of granite mountain."
- 5th Degree Black Belt (Chung Hae) - "Mastered all kinds of knowledge and utilizes this to do many things."
- 6th Degree Black Belt (Jhang Soo) - "Long Life."
- 7th Degree Black Belt (Chul Joon) - "A project of self-awareness towards an individual's future leadership role within Songham Taekwondo"
- 8th Degree Black Belt (Jeong Seung) - "Continually moving forward toward the right ideal or vision"
- 9th Degree Black Belt (Dong Seung) - "Peace of mind & tranquility."

The rank of 9th degree black belt is the highest conventional ranked Black Belt. Obtaining the rank denotes one as a "Grand Master". The honorary rank of 10th degree black belt, also known as "Eternal Grand Master", was bestowed upon Haeng Ung Lee, the founder of the ATA, following his death in 2000. The rank was sponsored and awarded by Grand Masters of other major martial arts, many of whom attended Haeng Ung Lee's funeral.

=== Attaining rank ===
Each rank from white belt to second degree black belt may be held either as a Recommended (R) or Decided (D) rank. The "decided" rank is a half step above the "recommended" rank. Some schools denote this rank with a piece of black tape around the end of the belt hanging on the student's right side, or a black strip along the center of the belt.

At promotional rank testings, students may receive a "Full Pass," "Half Pass," or "No Change." For recommended black belt ranks, the student is required to successfully pass testing for their next decided rank within 6 months of achieving their current recommended rank. Failure to do so would result in the student being returned to their next lowest decided rank (I.E. a 2nd degree recommended would be returned to 1st degree decided).

=== Mastership ===
Upon attaining the rank of 6th degree black belt, the next step is earning the mantle of "Master Instructor." To earn this title the 6th degree must undergo a rigorous application and testing process lasting one year.

Similarly, there is a minimum period of a year between earning a 7th degree and the Senior Master title, earning an 8th degree and the Chief Master title, and earning a 9th degree and the Grand Master title.

Before 2015, there was only one Grand Master at a time; however, after the promotion of multiple Grand Masters the title "Presiding Grand Master" is now used to distinguish the Grand Master chosen from the others to be in charge of the ATA.

=== ATA Tigers ===
The Taekwondo for ATA Tigers program for preschool students (3-6) uses patches with animals on them instead of black stripes on the belt to denote rank level: Turtle (Ara) for white belt, Tiger (Baeoh) for orange belt; Cheetah (Cheeri) for yellow belt; Lion (Raon) for camo belt; Eagle (Suri) for green belt; Phoenix (Choa) for purple belt; Dragon (Mir) for blue belt; Cobra (Narsha) for brown belt; and Panther (Baron) for red belt. [19]

Licensed locations often utilize full-length color stripes in belts to signify the various rank. White, Orange, Yellow, Camo, Green, Purple, Blue, Brown, Red and Black stripes run along the center of the belt from one end to the other. These locations may also utilize black wrapped stripes around one end to signify "time-in-grade" or "Degree of Rank" with advancement to the next belt color after obtaining five (5) stripes or 'degrees'.

== Forms ==
A form (poome sae) is a series of kicks, blocks and other techniques put together in a set pattern. The pattern becomes more complex as students progress through the ranks. For example, the 9th grade white belt form contains eighteen moves. The 5th grade green belt form has 34 moves, the 1st degree black belt form has 81 moves, and the 9th degree black belt form has 99 moves. If all of the forms (eighteen in all) are done in sequence, they form the pattern of a nine pointed star (eight outer points plus a center point) referred to as the Songahm Star. According to the ATA, when the outer points of the Songahm star are connected, they form a circle which exemplifies complete balance. The ATA teaches that forms create a contextual application for new material learned at each belt level.

=== Colored belts ===
- 9th Grade White Belt - Songahm 1 - 18 moves
- 8th Grade Orange Belt - Songahm 2 - 23 moves
- 7th Grade Yellow Belt - Songahm 3 - 28 moves
- 6th Grade Camouflage Belt - Songahm 4 - 31 moves
- 5th Grade Green Belt - Songahm 5 - 34 moves
- 4th Grade Purple Belt - In Wha 1 - 44 moves
- 3rd Grade Blue Belt - In Wha 2 - 42 moves
- 2nd Grade Brown Belt - Choong Jung 1 - 44 moves
- 1st Grade Red Belt - Choong Jung 2 - 46 moves

=== Black belts ===
- 1st Degree Black Belt - Shim Jun - 81 moves
- 2nd Degree Black Belt - Jung Yul - 82 moves
- 3rd Degree Black Belt - Chung San - 83 moves
- 4th Degree Black Belt - Sok Bong - 84 moves
- 5th Degree Black Belt - Chung Hae - 95 moves
- 6th Degree Black Belt - Jhang Soo - 96 moves
- 7th Degree Black Belt - Chul Joon - 97 moves
- 8th Degree Black Belt - Jeong Seung - 98 moves
- 9th Degree Black Belt - Dong Seung - 99 moves

=== One step sparring ===
One steps are a short combination of blocks, strikes and kicks that serve as a precursor to free sparring. The ATA aims to teach students to put moves into combinations, focus their techniques at a specific target, learn distancing and gain self-control. There are three specific one steps for each belt level starting at white belt and ending with green. As with the forms, the one steps become more complex as a student progresses in rank.

== Uniforms ==
Students and instructors alike each wear a traditional white dobok with the appropriate belt and additions. Each dobok has on the right breast an ATA shield patch with a school or club-specific patch on the left. On the back of the uniform, instructors and trainee instructors are required to have the word "TAEKWONDO" arching over a red and blue ATA patch. Underneath the patch is the instructor's name, either as "JOHN DOE" or "J. DOE." Non-instructor students may wear a uniform with "TAEKWONDO" and an ATA patch on the back, however, these students do not wear their names on their backs. Instead of a name, the student will have the location of the dojang. Certified tournament judges may wear their appropriate level chevrons on their left sleeves. Also, there is a black and red dobok used specifically for the leadership program, with red lettering and no patches.

Masters wear traditional silk uniforms for special events such as the Masters Ceremony at World Championships.

- Master - 6th degree black belt - White
- Senior Master - 7th degree black belt - Blue
- Chief Master - 8th degree black belt - Red
- Grand Master - 9th degree black belt - Black/Gold

Original ATA Patch. Retired in 2015.

At promotional testings and ATA tournaments, Level 3 Certified Instructors have the option to wear navy blue suits in lieu of their doboks. 5th degree black belts and up wear matching blue pants, while 1st through 4th degree black belts wear grey pants. A special ATA patch is worn on the instructor's left breast.

In the 2019 Tournament season they also released an Adidas black and white dobok.

== International branches ==
=== Songahm Taekwondo Federation ===
The Songahm Taekwondo Federation is a branch of ATA established for South America. It was founded in 1984 by H.U. Lee and Cesar Ozuna.

=== World Traditional Taekwondo Union ===
Founded during the fall of 1990, The World Traditional Taekwondo Union (WTTU) is a division of Songahm Taekwondo. While the ATA consists of taekwondo schools in the United States and the STF consists of schools in South America, the WTTU covers the remainder of the world.

== Governance ==
=== Songahm Grand Masters ===
Within the Songahm system of taekwondo, there has been traditionally one 9th Degree Black Belt within the organization at a time. This individual held the title of Grand Master and was considered to be the leader of Songahm Taekwondo.

After 2015, with the promotion of a second concurrent 9th Degree (Richard Reed), the title "Presiding Grand Master" is now used to indicate the Grand Master chosen from among the group of 9th degrees to be in charge of the martial arts side of ATA.

Past and present Grand Masters include:

==== Presiding Grand Masters ====
- Haeng Ung Lee (1990–d. 2000); promoted to Eternal Grand Master in 2003
- Soon Ho Lee (2001–2011)(2021–r. 2022); Current Title: Grand Master Emeritus
- In Ho Lee (2011–r. 2019) Current Title: Grand Master Emeritus
- Gyung Kun Lee (2019–2021) (Current Presiding Grand Master of Global Traditional Martial Arts "GTMA")
- Mal Kun Lee (2022–present)

==== Grand Masters ====
- Grand Master M.K. Lee (2019–present; promoted to Presiding Grandmaster 2022)
- Grand Master William Clark (2016–present)
- Grand Master Robert Jager (2019–present)
- Grand Master Michael Caruso (2019–present)
- Grand Master Al Dilegge (2023–present)
- Grand Master Larry Hoover (2023–present)
- Grand Master Phillip Minton (2023–present)
- Grand Master Tammy Harvey-Stauber (2024–present; First Female Grand Master in the ATA)
- Grand Master Dan Thor (2024–present)
- Grand Master Tony Isaacs (2024–present)
- Grand Master William Wacholz (2024–present)
- Grand Master Tomas Sandoval (2024–present)
- Grand Master Mark Sustaire (2025–present)
- Grand Master Cheryl Brice (2025–present)
- Grand Master Fernando Jaime (2025–present)
- Grand Master Jay Kohl (2026-present)
- Grand Master Vincent Raimondi (2026-present)

==== Former Grand Masters ====
- Grand Master Richard Reed (2015–d. 2016)
- Grand Master Robert Allemier (2016–d. 2023)
- Grand Master Cesar Ozuna (2019–2020; no longer a member of ATA)
- Grand Master G.K. Lee (2017–2019; no longer a member of ATA)

==== 9th Degree Black Belts ====
- Chief Master Scott Stauffer (2023)
- Chief Master Robert Roy (2025)
- Chief Master Patti Barnum (2025)
- Chief Master Rick Whitehead (2025)
- Chief Master Eugene Candreva (2025)
- Chief Master Eric Moberly (2026)
- Chief Master Shane Sanders (2026)
- Chief Master Ken Church (2026)

=== Founder's Council ===
When H.U. Lee was promoted to Grand Master in 1990, he created an informal council of "his most loyal and trusted Masters and advisors." This council consisted of Soon Ho Lee (H.U.'s brother and successor), In Ho Lee (Soon Ho's successor), G.K. Lee (In Ho's successor), Robert Allemier, William Clark, and M.K. Lee (G.K.'s successor).

=== Master's Council ===
With his diagnosis of cancer in 2000, H.U. Lee realized it was necessary to formalize his founder's council and thus "communicate his vision to the other seniors in the organization". Via his Grand Master's Decree on September 9, 2000, the Master's Council was created with the following members: Grandmasters Clark, In Ho Lee, G.K. Lee, M.K. Lee, Robert Jager, Michael Caruso, and Cesar Ozuna (with whom H.U. Lee had founded the South American branch).

Current Masters Council Members

- Presiding Grand Master M.K. Lee
- Grand Master Al Dilegge
- Grand Master Larry Hoover
- Grand Master Tammy Harvey-Stauber
- Grand Master Vincent Raimondi
- Chief Master Michelle Landgren-Lee
- Chief Master Michael Wegmann
- Chief Master Jordan Schreiber

European Masters Council Members

- Chief Master Jordan Schreiber
- Senior Master Miguel Loureiro
- Master Pedro Tanger
- Master Antonio Monteiro
- Master Francisco Amaral

Former Masters Council Members

- Grand Master Robert Jager
- Grand Master Michael Caruso
- Grand Master Tony Isaacs
