= Distancing =

Distancing is the appropriate selection of distance between oneself and a combatant throughout an encounter. Distancing is significant in an altercation as it determines both attack and defence options for all parties involved. Timing and tactics are also important elements of combat which are often used in conjunction with distancing by experienced martial artists.

Distancing is an important concept in all combative sports and arts. It applies to both un-armed and armed combat. In a martial sense, armed combat takes the form of traditional weapons practice. Given the enormous variety of martial arts weapons in addition to the various ranges of un-armed combat, it is possible to divide distancing up into many sub-distances or ranges. Indeed, many martial arts have their own uniques expressions for various distances or ranges derived from those they specialise in.

Distances may be divided up in a number of ways which include various combinations of major and sub-ranges. Although many styles train practitioners at varying ranges, most styles specialise in one or two major sets of ranges.

In a general, most arts describe each of the following ranges (from longest to shortest):

- Non-contact range
- Kicking range
- Punching range
- Clinch fighting range
- Ground fighting range

In addition, a great many sub-ranges may be included. One example is the division of the punching range into:

- Finger striking range
- Punching range
- Palm-striking range

All other ranges may also be subdivided in a similar manner.

Many martial arts focus on specific distances. Examples of this are as follows:

- Kicking range: Taekwondo
- Punching range: Boxing
- Clinch fighting range: Muay Thai
- Ground fighting range: Brazilian Jujitsu

== See also ==
- Maai
