= Choi Hong-hi =

South Korean general and martial artist (1918–2002)

- Born: 9 November 1918; Hwadae, Korea, Empire of Japan
- Died: 15 June 2002 (aged 83); Pyongyang, North Korea
- Style: Karate, Taekwondo
- Teachers: Gichin Funakoshi (Karate), Kim Hyun-soo (Karate)
- Rank: 9th dan, Grand Master, principal founder, Tae Kwon Do (ITF); 2nd dan, karate

Other information
- Children: Choi Jung Hwa (son)

- Choi Hong-hi
- Hangul: 최홍희
- Hanja: 崔泓熙
- RR: Choe Honghui
- MR: Ch'oe Honghŭi

Choi Hong-hi (Korean: 최홍희; 9 November 1918 – 15 June 2002) was a South Korean martial artist and army general who was an important figure in the history of the Korean martial art of Taekwondo, albeit controversial due to his introduction of taekwondo to North Korea.

Choi is regarded as the "Founder of Taekwon-Do"—most often by organizations belonging to the International Taekwon-Do Federation (ITF), the first international federation for Taekwondo, which he founded. Others, such as World Taekwondo, portray Choi as either an unimportant or a dishonorable figure in taekwondo history because of his defection to North Korea, either by omitting him from their versions of taekwondo history or through explicit statements, due to the aforementioned controversy.

== Early life ==
Choi was born on 9 November 1918 in Hwadae, Meigawa-gun, Kankyōhoku Province, Korea, Empire of Japan (now Myongchon County, North Hamgyong Province, North Korea). Choi originally claimed that his father sent him to study calligraphy under Han Il-dong, who was also "a master of taekkyon, the ancient Korean art of foot fighting". He later recanted this story and said that he never studied taekkyeon and that it had nothing to contribute to taekwondo. Choi travelled to Japan, where he studied English, mathematics, and karate. In Kyoto, he met a fellow Korean with the surname Kim, who was a karate instructor and taught Choi this martial art. Choi also claimed to have learned Shotokan karate under Funakoshi Gichin. Just before he had left Korea, Choi apparently had a disagreement with a wrestler named Hu, and the possibility of a future confrontation inspired him to train; in his own words, "I would imagine that these were the techniques I would use to defend myself against the wrestler, Mr. Hu, if he did attempt to carry out his promise to tear me limb from limb when I eventually returned to Korea". Choi attained the rank of 1st dan in karate in 1939, and then 2nd dan soon after.. By the time he published his 1965 book, Taekwon-Do: The Art of Self-Defence, Choi was claiming 9th Dan.

== Military career ==
Choi was enlisted into the Japanese army during World War II, later stating that he had been forced to serve. He wrote that he was imprisoned for attempting to escape and, in June 1945, was sentenced to seven years for conspiracy by a Japanese Military Court for his involvement in a rebellion. Following the war, in January 1946, Choi was commissioned as a second lieutenant in the Korean army. From 1946 to 1951, Choi received promotions to first lieutenant, captain, major, lieutenant colonel, colonel, and then brigadier general. Choi was promoted to major general in 1954.

== Taekwondo ==
Choi combined elements of Oh Do Kwan Karate and Tang Soo Do to develop a style of the martial art known as "Taekwondo"; his organization spelled it Taekwon-Do, (태권도; 跆拳道), which means "kick, fist, art" or "the way of hand and foot" and it was so named on 11 April 1955. Choi co-founded the Oh Do Kwan, and was made an honorary director and given an honorary 4th dan ranking in the Chung Do Kwan. Due to accusations of dishonesty, Choi was stripped of his rank and position in the Chung Do Kwan.

Choi, together with other Korean martial arts instructors, was a major contributor to the global expansion of taekwondo. ITF taekwondo organizations credit Choi with starting the spread of taekwondo internationally by stationing Korean taekwondo instructors around the world, and have consistently claimed that ITF-style taekwondo is the only authentic style of taekwondo, most notably in early sections of its textbooks. He was also the author of the first English taekwondo syllabus book, Taekwon-Do, published by Daeha Publication Company in 1965. In 1972, Choi went into exile in Canada after the South Korean government refused to allow his organisation to teach taekwondo in North Korea, and the South Korea government formed the World Taekwondo Federation (WTF) in 1973 (renamed to WT in 2018). In 1979, he traveled and defected to North Korea where he was welcomed by the government and supported in his project of spreading Taekwondo to the world.

== Death ==
Choi died of cancer on 15 June 2002 in Pyongyang, North Korea, where he received a state funeral in the Patriotic Martyrs' Cemetery. On his funeral committee were:

- Choe Thae-bok
- Kim Jung-rin
- Kim Yong-sun
- Kim Yong-dae
- Ryu Mi-yong
- Ryom Sun-gil
- Kim Kyong-ho
- Sung Sang-sop
- Pak Sun-hui
- An Kyong-ho
- Kang Ryon-hak
- Chang Ung
- Hwang Pong-yong
- Kim Yu-ho

Choi is listed in the Taekwondo Hall of Fame with various titles: "Father of Taekwon-Do," "Founder and First President of the International Taekwon-Do Federation," and "Founder of Oh Do Kwan." Choi is survived by his wife, Choi Joon-hee; his son, Choi Jung-hwa; two daughters, Sunny and Meeyun; and several grandchildren.

== See also ==
- List of taekwondo grandmasters

== Explanatory notes ==
a. The spelling of "taekwondo" varies widely in English usage. The WT and affiliated organizations typically use "taekwondo," while the ITF and affiliated organizations typically use "taekwon-do" (as Choi used this spelling). In Wikipedia, the default spelling is "taekwondo." This article follows this standard, but uses "taekwon-do" when referring specifically to the ITF or affiliated organizations' names.

b. In Park's (1993) article, the note on Choi's promotion to 2nd dan in karate is followed by a note about the outbreak of World War II, which would suggest that Choi's 2nd dan promotion occurred no later than the early stages of that conflict (c. 1939–1940).
