= Lee Soon-ho (politician) =

South Korean politician

President of the Korea Securities Depository
- In office March 2023 – April 2026

Personal details
- Born: 1967 (age 58–59)
- Education: Seoul National University; University of Illinois

Lee Soon-ho (born 1967) is a South Korean politician. Lee was the President of the Korea Securities Depository.

== Biography ==
Lee was born in 1967. Lee graduated from Dongin High School. Lee gained a bachelor´s degree from Seoul National University, a master´s degree from Seoul National University from Seoul National University´s Graduate School, and a Doctor of Philosophy degree from the University of Illinois. All three of his degrees were in economics.

In 2008, Lee became a research fellow at the Korea Institute of Finance and a expert member of the Legal Task Force of the Fair Trade Commission. In 2011, Lee became a member of the Self-Evaluation Committee of the Financial Services Commission. In 2012, Lee became a member of the Management Performance Evaluation Committee of the National Pension Fund. In 2013, he became a visiting scholar of the University of South California.

In 2016, Lee became a board member of the Korean Industrial Organization Society, and the Office for Government Policy Coordination´s Government Policy Evaluation Support Support Group. In 2018, he became Director of the Financial Consumer Research Center of the Korea Institute of Finance. In 2019, Lee became a member of the Financial Services Commission´s Regulatory Verification Committee and National Economic Advisory Council´s Policy Research Review Committee.

In 2020, Lee became Director of Digital Finance Research Center of the Korea Institute of Finance. In 2022, Lee became Head of Banking and Insurance Research Division 2 of the Korea Institute of Finance, independent director of the NH NongHyup Financial Group, Chairman of the Financial Security Advisory Committee of the Financial Security Institute, and Head of the Banking Research Division of the Korea Institute of Finance.

In March 2023, Lee became President of the Korea Securities Depository. In an interview about the 50th anniversary of the depository, he spoke of his plans its future. During his tenure as president of the depository, he has focused on customer services and technology. On June 14, 2023, Lee held a press conference in Seoul to mark his 100th day in office. On November 4, 2026, Lee unveiled a system that allows all of the companies required to hold online shareholder meetings to hold them at once. In April 2026, Yoon Soo Lee became the president of the Korea Securities Depository.
