= Taekwondo =

Korean martial art

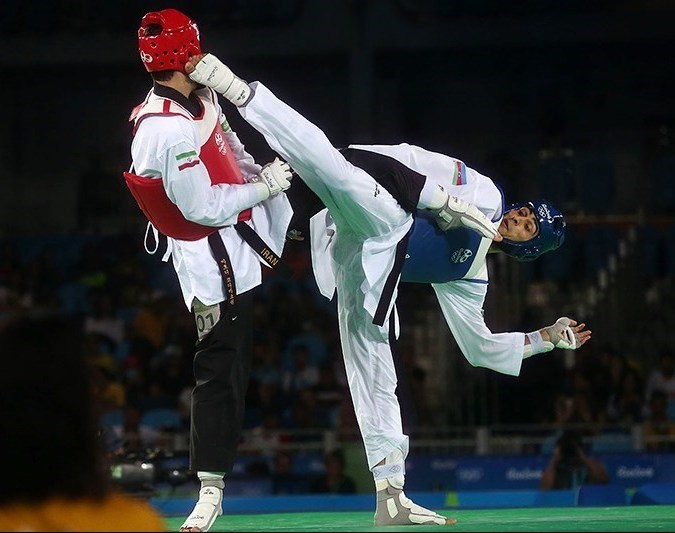
- A taekwondo match at the 2016 Summer Olympics
- Also known as: TKD, tae kwon do, tae kwon-do, taekwon-do, tae-kwon-do
- Focus: Striking, kicking, blocking
- Country of origin: South Korea
- Creator: No single creator; a collaborative effort by representatives from the original nine Kwans, initially supervised by Choi Hong-hi.
- Famous practitioners: (see list)
- Parenthood: Mainly karate; (Note: Namely Shotokan and Shudokan, which served as basis for styles practiced by the original nine Kwans.) with taekkyon and some Chinese martial arts
- Olympic sport: Since 2000 (World Taekwondo) (demonstration sport in 1988 and 1992)

Korean name
- Hangul: 태권도
- Hanja: 跆拳道
- RR: taegwondo
- MR: t'aekwŏndo
- IPA: t̪ʰɛ.k͈wʌ̹n.d̪o

Sport
- Highest governing body: International Taekwon-Do Federation (ITF) and World Taekwondo (WT)
- First played: Korea

Characteristics
- Contact: Full-contact (WT), Light and medium-contact (ITF, ITC, ATKDA, GBTF, GTF, ATA, TI, TCUK, TAGB)
- Mixed-sex: Yes
- Type: Martial art and Combat sport
- Equipment: Combat sport: Hogu, headgear

Presence
- Country or region: Worldwide
- Olympic: Since 2000
- Paralympic: Since 2020
- World Games: 1981–1993

Taekwondo (/ˌtaɪkwɒnˈdoʊ, ˌtaɪˈkwɒndoʊ, ˌtɛkwənˈdoʊ/; Korean: 태권도; [t̪ʰɛ.k͈wʌ̹n.d̪o]) is a Korean martial art and combat sport involving primarily kicking techniques and punching. "Taekwondo" can be translated as tae ("strike with foot"), kwon ("strike with hand"), and do ("the art or way").

Depending on the style, Hyeong, Poomsae or Teul are patterns that demonstrate a range of kicking, punching and blocking techniques, gyeokpa is the art of breaking wooden boards and in the combat sport kyorugi involves the kind of sparring seen in the Olympics. Taekwondo is primarily an unarmed martial art practiced with the bare hands and feet and does not include weapons such as swords or nunchucks (nunchaku). Taekwondo practitioners wear a uniform known as a dobok.

Taekwondo is originally a martial art which was developed during the 1940s and 1950s by Korean martial artists with experience in martial arts such as karate and Chinese martial arts. In the early 1970s, a new style of Taekwondo was developed to promote it as a competitive sport, alongside its traditional martial arts form.

The oldest governing body for taekwondo is the Korea Taekwondo Association (KTA), formed in 1959 through a collaborative effort by representatives from the nine original kwans, or martial arts schools, in Korea. The main international organizational bodies for taekwondo today are various branches of the International Taekwon-Do Federation (ITF), originally founded by Choi Hong-hi in 1966, and the partnership of the Kukkiwon and World Taekwondo (WT, formerly World Taekwondo Federation or WTF), founded in 1972 and 1973 respectively by the Korea Taekwondo Association. Kyorugi ([kjʌɾuɡi]), a type of full-contact sparring, has been an Olympic event since 2000. In 2018, the South Korean government officially designated taekwondo as Korea's national martial art. At the Olympic and Paralympic level, taekwondo is governed by World Taekwondo.

== History ==
=== Emergence of various kwans ===
Beginning in 1945, shortly after the end of World War II and the Japanese occupation, new martial arts schools called kwans opened in Seoul. These schools were established by Korean martial artists with backgrounds in Japanese and Chinese martial arts.

Early progenitors of taekwondo—the founders of the nine original kwans—who were able to study in Japan were exposed to Japanese martial arts, including karate, judo, and kendo, while others were exposed to the martial arts of China and Manchuria.

Discussions around the historical influences of taekwondo have been controversial, with two main schools of thought: traditionalism and revisionism. Traditionalism holds that the origins of taekwondo are indigenous while revisionism, the prevailing theory, argues that taekwondo is rooted in karate. In later years, the Korean government has been a significant supporter of traditionalist views as to divorce taekwondo from its link to Japan and give Korea a "legitimate cultural past".

=== Attempt to standardize taekwondo ===
In 1952, South Korean president Syngman Rhee witnessed a martial arts demonstration by South Korean Army officers Choi Hong-hi and Nam Tae-hi from the 29th Infantry Division. He misrecognized the technique on display as taekkyon, and urged martial arts to be introduced to the army under a single system. Beginning in 1955 the leaders of the kwans began discussing in earnest the possibility of creating a unified Korean martial art. Until then, "Tang Soo Do" was the term used for Korean karate, using the Korean hanja pronunciation of the Japanese kanji 唐手道. The name "Tae Soo Do" (跆手道) was also used to describe a unified style Korean martial arts. This name consists of the hanja 跆 tae "to stomp, trample", 手 su "hand" and 道 do "way, discipline".

Choi Hong-hi advocated the use of the name "Tae Kwon Do", replacing su "hand" with 拳 kwon (Revised Romanization: gwon; McCune–Reischauer: kwŏn) "fist", the term also used for "martial arts" in Chinese (pinyin quán). The name was also the closest to the pronunciation of "taekkyon", The new name was initially slow to catch on among the leaders of the kwans. During this time taekwondo was also adopted for use by the South Korean military, which increased its popularity among civilian martial arts schools.

=== Development of multiple styles ===
In 1959, the Korea Tae Soo Do Association (later Korea Taekwondo Association or KTA) was established to facilitate the unification of Korean martial arts. Choi wanted all the other member kwans of the KTA to adopt his own Chang Hon-style of taekwondo, as a unified style. This was, however, met with resistance as the other kwans instead wanted a unified style to be created based on inputs from all the kwans, to serve as a way to bring on the heritage and characteristics of all of the styles, not just the style of a single kwan. As a response to this, along with political disagreements about teaching taekwondo in North Korea and unifying the whole Korean Peninsula, Choi broke with the (South Korea) KTA in 1966, in order to establish the International Taekwon-Do Federation (ITF)— a separate governing body devoted to institutionalizing his Chang Hon-style of taekwondo in Canada.

Initially, the South Korean president gave Choi's ITF limited support, due to their personal relationship. However, Choi and the government later split on the issue of whether to accept North Korean influence on the martial art. In 1972, South Korea withdrew its support for the ITF. The ITF continued to function as an independent federation, then headquartered in Toronto, Canada. Choi continued to develop the ITF-style, notably with the 1983 publication of his Encyclopedia of Taekwon-Do. After his retirement, the ITF split in 2001 and then again in 2002 to create three separate ITF federations, each of which continues to operate today under the same name.

In 1972, the KTA and the South Korean government's Ministry of Culture, Sports and Tourism established the Kukkiwon as the new national academy for taekwondo. Kukkiwon now serves many of the functions previously served by the KTA, in terms of defining a government-sponsored unified style of taekwondo. In 1973 the KTA and Kukkiwon supported the establishment of the World Taekwondo Federation (WTF), which later changed its name to "World Taekwondo" (WT) in 2017 due to the previous initialism overlapping with an internet slang term. While the Kukkiwon focus on the martial art and self-defence aspects of Kukki-Taekwondo, the WT promoted the sportive side, and its competitions employ a subset of the techniques present in the Kukkiwon-style taekwondo. For this reason, Kukkiwon-style Taekwondo is often referred to as WT-style Taekwondo, sport-style Taekwondo, or Olympic-style Taekwondo, though in reality the style is defined by the Kukkiwon, not the WT.

Since 2000, taekwondo has been one of three Asian martial arts (the others being judo and karate), and one of six total (the others being the previously mentioned, Greco-Roman wrestling, freestyle wrestling, and boxing) included in the Olympic Games. It started as a demonstration event at the 1988 games in Seoul, a year after becoming a medal event at the Pan Am Games, and became an official medal event at the 2000 Summer Olympics. In 2010, taekwondo was accepted as a Commonwealth Games sport.

== Features ==
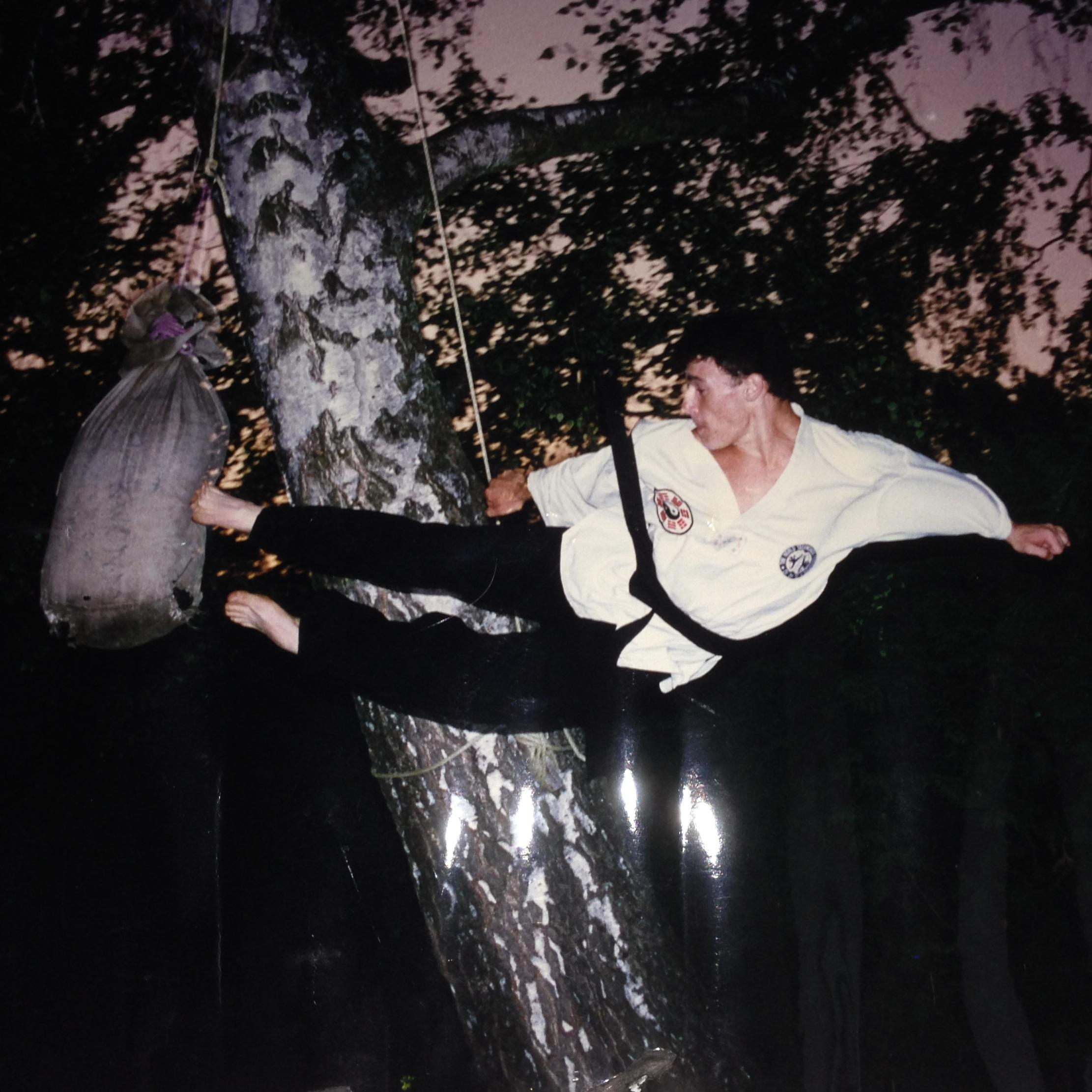
Flying twin foot side kick

A jumping reverse hook kick

Taekwondo is characterized by its emphasis on head-height kicks, jumping and spinning kicks, and fast kicking techniques. WT sparring competitions award additional points for strikes that incorporate spinning kicks, kicks to the head, or both.

=== Typical curriculum ===
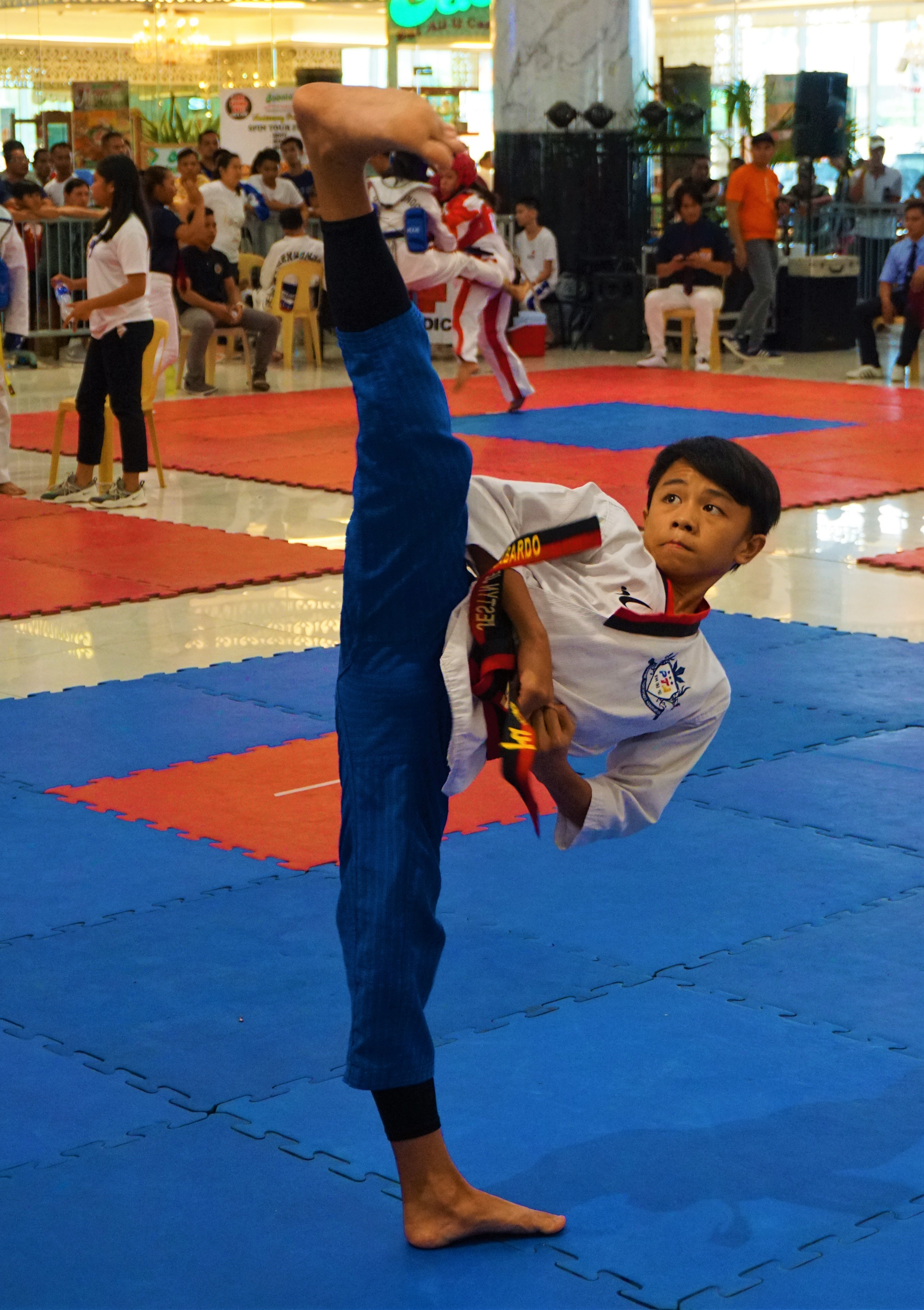
A junior black-belt performs Koryo

While organisations such as ITF or Kukkiwon define the general style of taekwondo, individual clubs and schools tend to tailor their taekwondo practices. Although each taekwondo club or school is different, a student typically takes part in most or all of the following:

- Forms (품새; pumsae or poomsae, also 형; 型; hyeong; hyung, and 틀; teul; tul): these serve the same function as kata in the study of karate
- Sparring (겨루기; gyeorugi or 맞서기; matseogi): sparring includes variations such as freestyle sparring (in which competitors spar without interruption for several minutes); seven-, three-, two-, and one-step sparring (in which students practice pre-arranged sparring combinations); and point sparring (in which sparring is interrupted and then resumed after each point is scored)
- Breaking (격파; 擊破; gyeokpa or weerok): the breaking of boards is used for testing, training, and martial arts demonstrations. Demonstrations often also incorporate bricks, tiles, and blocks of ice or other materials. These techniques can be separated into three types:
  - Power breaking – using straightforward techniques to break as many boards as possible
  - Speed breaking – boards are held loosely by one edge, putting special focus on the speed required to perform the break
  - Special techniques – breaking fewer boards but by using jumping or flying techniques to attain greater height, distance, or to clear obstacles
- Self-defense techniques (호신술; 護身術; hosinsul)
- Throwing and/or falling techniques (던지기; deonjigi or tteoreojigi 떨어지기)
- Both anaerobic and aerobic workouts, including stretching
- Relaxation and meditation exercises, as well as breathing control
- A focus on mental and ethical discipline, etiquette, justice, respect, self-confidence, and leadership skills
- Examinations to progress to the next rank, indicated by a belt color

Though weapons training is not a formal part of most taekwondo federation curricula, individual schools will often incorporate additional training with weapons such as staffs, knives, and sticks.

== Styles and organizations ==
There are a number of major taekwondo styles as well as a few niche styles. Most styles are associated with a governing body or federation that defines the style. The major technical differences among taekwondo styles and organizations generally revolve around:

- The patterns practiced by each style (called 형; hyeong, pumsae 품새, or tul 틀, depending on the style); these are sets of prescribed formal sequences of movements that demonstrate mastery of posture, positioning, and technique
- Differences in the sparring rules for competition.
- Martial arts philosophy.

=== 1946: Traditional Taekwondo ===
"Traditional Taekwondo" refers to the 1940s and 1950s martial arts by the nine original kwans. They used a number of different names such as Tang Soo Do (Chinese Hand Way), (Note: Used by Chung Do Kwan and Moo Duk Kwan) Kong Soo Do (Empty Hand Way) (Note: Used by Yun Mu Kwan/Jidokwan and YMCA Kwon Bop Bu/Chang Moo Kwan) and Tae Soo Do (Foot Hand Way). (Note: Was an early name of taekwondo before Choi Hong-hi managed to convince the organization to adopt the name taekwondo instead.) Traditional Taekwondo is still practised today but generally under names like Tang Soo Do and Soo Bahk Do. In 1959, the name taekwondo was agreed upon by the nine original kwans as a common term for their martial arts. As part of the unification process, the Korea Taekwondo Association (KTA) was formed through a collaborative effort by representatives from all the kwans, and the work began on a common curriculum, which eventually resulted in the Kukkiwon and the Kukki Style of Taekwondo. The original kwans that formed KTA continue to exist today, but as independent fraternal membership organizations that support the World Taekwondo and Kukkiwon. The kwans also function as a channel for the issuing of Kukkiwon dan and poom certification (black belt ranks) for their members. The official curriculum of those kwans that joined the unification is that of the Kukkiwon, with the notable exception of half the Oh Do Kwan which joined the ITF instead and therefore uses the Chan Hon curriculum.

Some of the nine original kwans during this period were brought to United States and other countries. The famous Chung Do Kwan teacher, Jhoon Rhee became known as the "father of Taekwondo in United States" when he taught his Taekwondo style to the Americans. Chung Do Kwan style Taekwondo became one of the three dominant fighting styles, along with Tang Soo Do (Moo Duk Kwan) and Shōrin-ryū Karate, in the American "Blood and Guts" karate competitions, where bare-knuckle punches to the face, kicks, and stomps were legal even to a downed opponent. Rhee's students include famous fighters like Jeff Smith, Allen Steen, Fred Wren, and Skipper Mullins. Steen, Wren, Smith, and Mullins became top competitors in these karate circuits. Steen became famous for defeating Shōrin-ryū Karate legend, Joe Lewis, and Tang Soo Do stylist, Chuck Norris in 1966 at Long Beach Internationals. Jeff Smith also competed in Full Contact (American) Kickboxing, and in 1974 he became the PKA's first World Middleweight Champion.

=== 1966: ITF/Chang Hon-style Taekwondo ===
International Taekwon-Do Federation (ITF)-style Taekwondo, more accurately known as Chang Hon-style Taekwondo, is defined by Choi Hong-hi's Encyclopedia of Taekwon-Do published in 1983.

In 1990, the Global Taekwondo Federation (GTF) split from the ITF due to the political controversies surrounding the ITF; the GTF continues to practice ITF-style Taekwondo, however, with additional elements incorporated into the style. Likewise, the ITF itself split in 2001 and again in 2002 into three separate federations, headquartered in Austria, the United Kingdom, and Spain respectively.

The GTF and all three ITFs practice Choi's ITF-style Taekwondo. In ITF-style Taekwondo, the word used for "forms" is tul; the specific set of tul used by the ITF is called Chang Hon. Choi defined 24 Chang Hon tul. The names and symbolism of the Chang Hon tul refer to elements of Korean history, culture and religious philosophy. The GTF-variant of ITF practices an additional six tul.

Within the ITF taekwondo tradition there are two sub-styles:

- The style of taekwondo practised by the ITF before its 1973 split with the KTA is sometimes called by ITF practitioners "Traditional Taekwondo", though a more accurate term would be Traditional ITF Taekwondo.
- After the 1973 split, Choi Hong-hi continued to develop and refine the style, ultimately publishing his work in his 1983 Encyclopedia of Taekwondo. Among the refinements incorporated into this new sub-style is the "sine wave"; one of Choi Hong-hi's later principles of taekwondo is that the body's centre of gravity should be raised-and-lowered throughout a movement.

Some ITF schools adopt the sine wave style, while others do not. Essentially all ITF schools do, however, use the patterns (tul) defined in the Encyclopedia, with some exceptions related to the forms Juche and Ko-Dang.

=== 1969: ATA/Songahm-style Taekwondo ===
In 1969, Haeng Ung Lee, a former Taekwondo instructor in the South Korean military, relocated to Omaha, Nebraska and established a chain of martial arts schools in the United States under the banner of the American Taekwondo Association (ATA). Like Jhoon Rhee Taekwondo, ATA Taekwondo has its roots in traditional taekwondo. The style of Taekwondo practised by the ATA is called Songahm Taekwondo. The ATA went on to become one of the largest chains of Taekwondo schools in the United States.

The ATA established international spin-offs called the Songahm Taekwondo Federation (STF) and the World Traditional Taekwondo Union (WTTU) to promote the practice of Songahm Taekwondo internationally. In 2015, all the spin-offs were reunited under the umbrella of ATA International.

=== 1970s: Jhoon Rhee-style Taekwondo ===
In 1962, Jhoon Rhee, upon graduating from college in Texas, relocated to and established a chain of martial arts schools in the Washington, D.C. area that practiced Traditional Taekwondo. (Note: Tang Soo Do, Chung Do Kwan) In the 1970s, at the urging of Choi Hong-hi, Rhee adopted ITF-style Taekwondo within his chain of schools, but like the GTF later departed from the ITF due to the political controversies surrounding Choi and the ITF. Rhee went on to develop his own style of taekwondo called Jhoon Rhee-style Taekwondo, incorporating elements of both traditional and ITF-style Taekwondo as well as original elements.

=== 1972: Kukkiwon-style / WT-Taekwondo ===
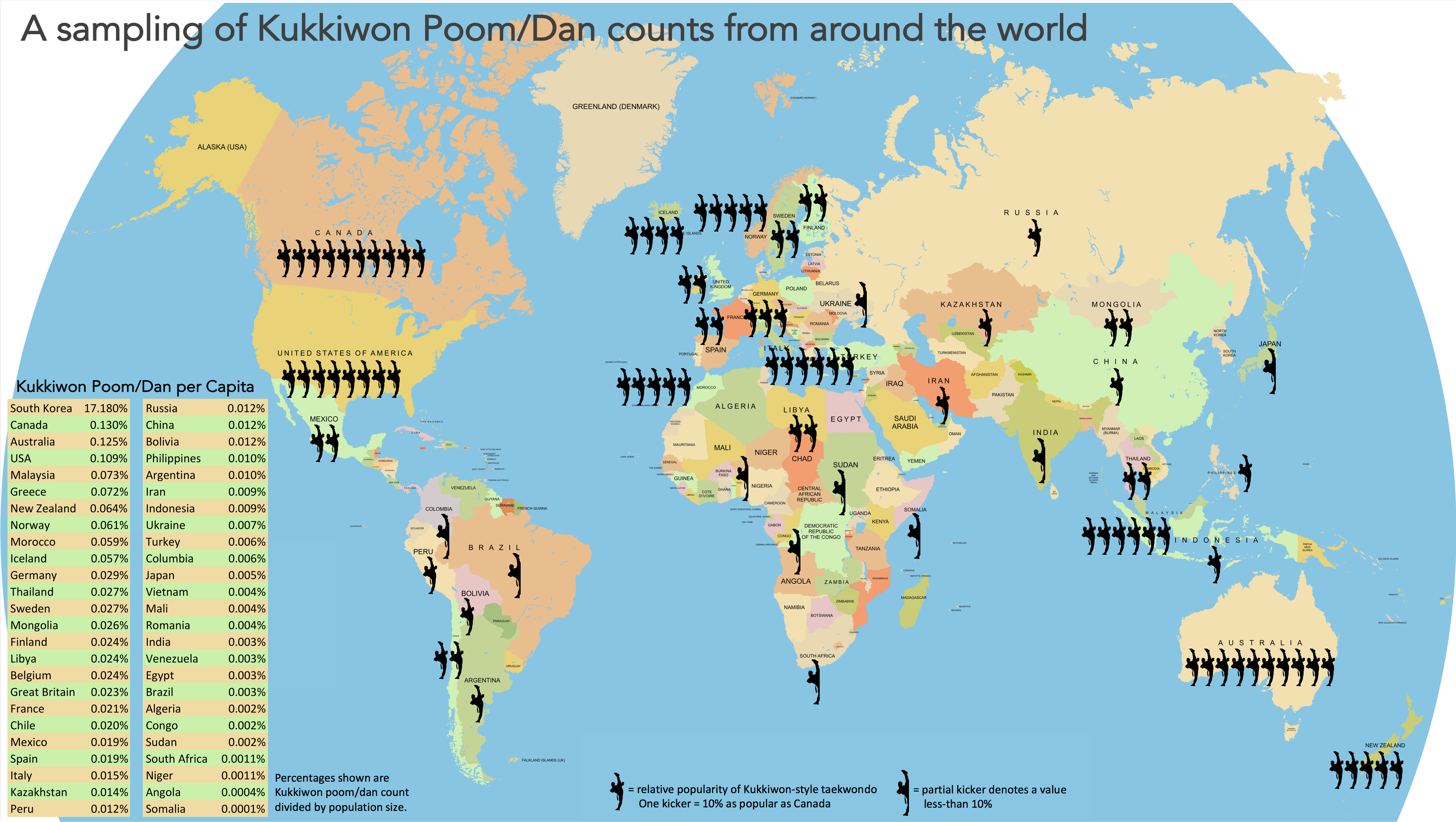
Relative popularity of Kukkiwon-style Taekwondo around the world

In 1972, the Korea Taekwondo Association (KTA) Central Dojang opened in Seoul; in 1973, the name was changed to Kukkiwon. Under the sponsorship of the South Korean government's Ministry of Culture, Sports and Tourism the Kukkiwon became the new national academy for Taekwondo, thereby establishing a new "unified" style of Taekwondo. In 1973, the KTA established the World Taekwondo Federation (WTF, now called World Taekwondo, WT) to promote the sportive side of Kukkiwon-Taekwondo. The International Olympic Committee recognized the WT and Taekwondo sparring in 1980. For this reason, the Kukkiwon-defined style of Taekwondo is sometimes referred to as Sport-style Taekwondo, Olympic-style Taekwondo, or WT-style Taekwondo, but the style itself is defined by the Kukkiwon, not by the WT, and the WT competition ruleset itself only allows the use of a very small number of the total number of techniques included in the style.

=== Extreme Taekwondo ===
Extreme Taekwondo is a hybrid style created in 2008, by Taekwondo practitioner Shin-Min Cheol, who also founded Mirme Korea in 2012, a production company that helped spread his style. His company is based on promoting TKD tournaments in a style which mixes other martial arts like Karate and Capoeira.

== Equipment and facilities ==
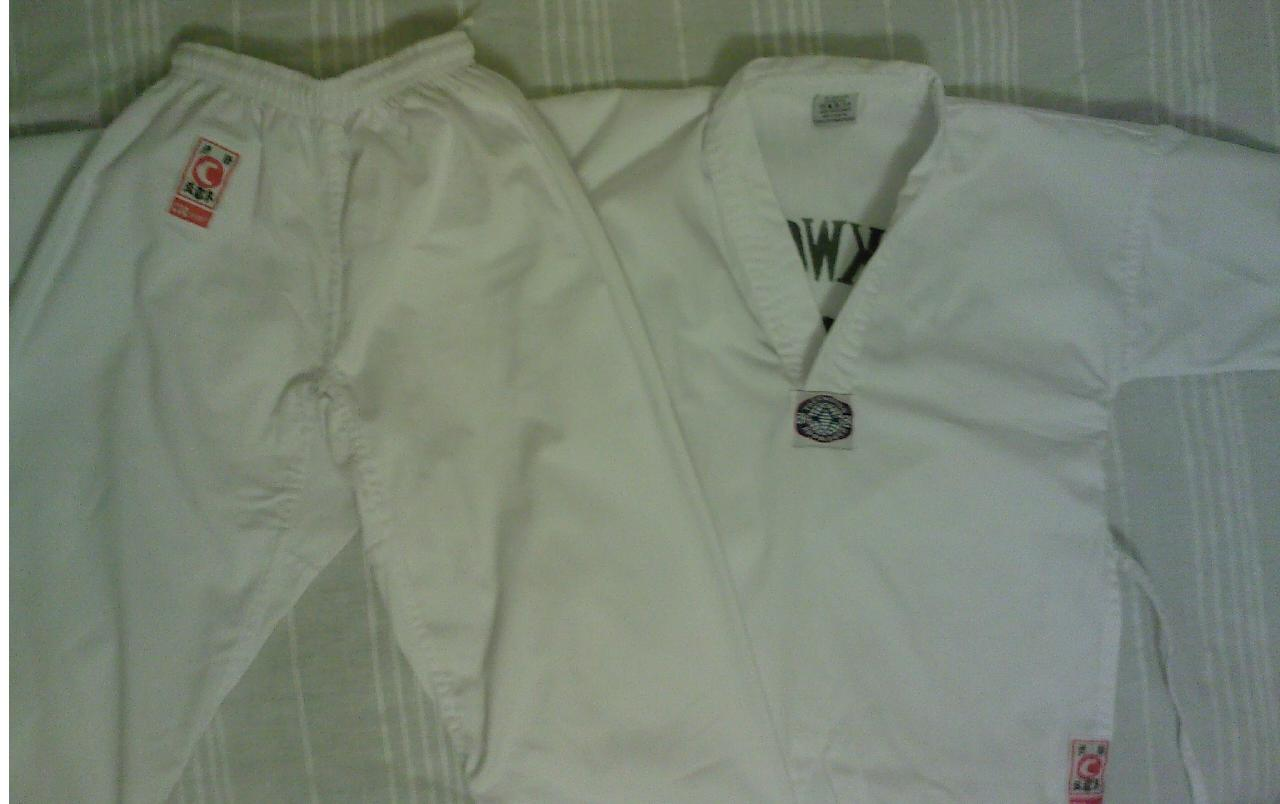
A WT-style dobok

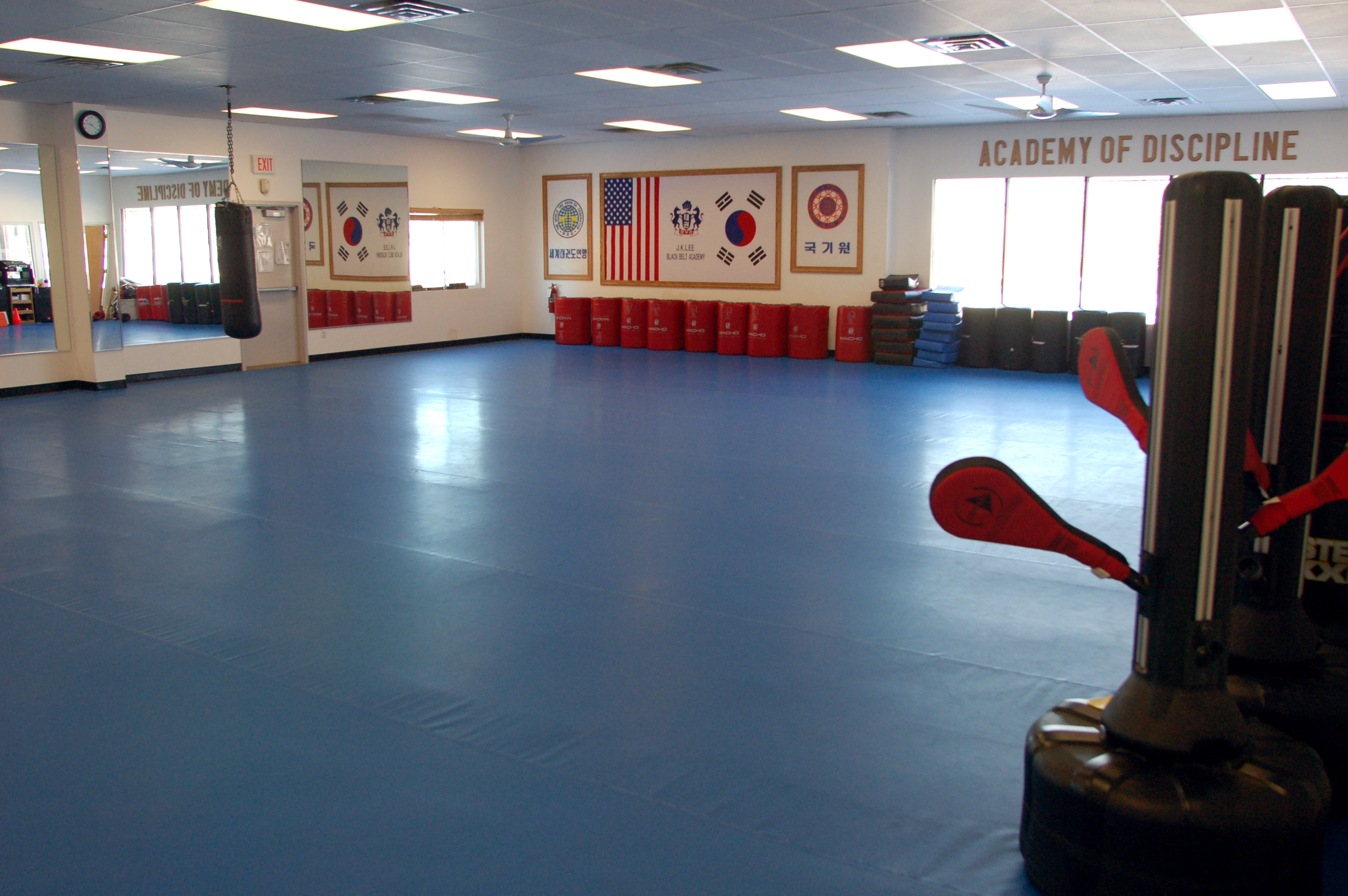
A dojang

A Taekwondo practitioner typically wears a dobok (도복; 道服) uniform with a belt tied around the waist.

When sparring, padded equipment is usually worn. In the ITF tradition, typically only the hands and feet are padded. In the Kukkiwon/WT tradition, full-contact sparring is facilitated by the employment of more extensive equipment: padded helmets called homyun are always worn, as are padded torso protectors called hogu; feet, shins, groins, hands, and forearms protectors are also worn.

The school or place where instruction is given is called a dojang (도장; 道場).

== Ranks, belts, and promotion ==
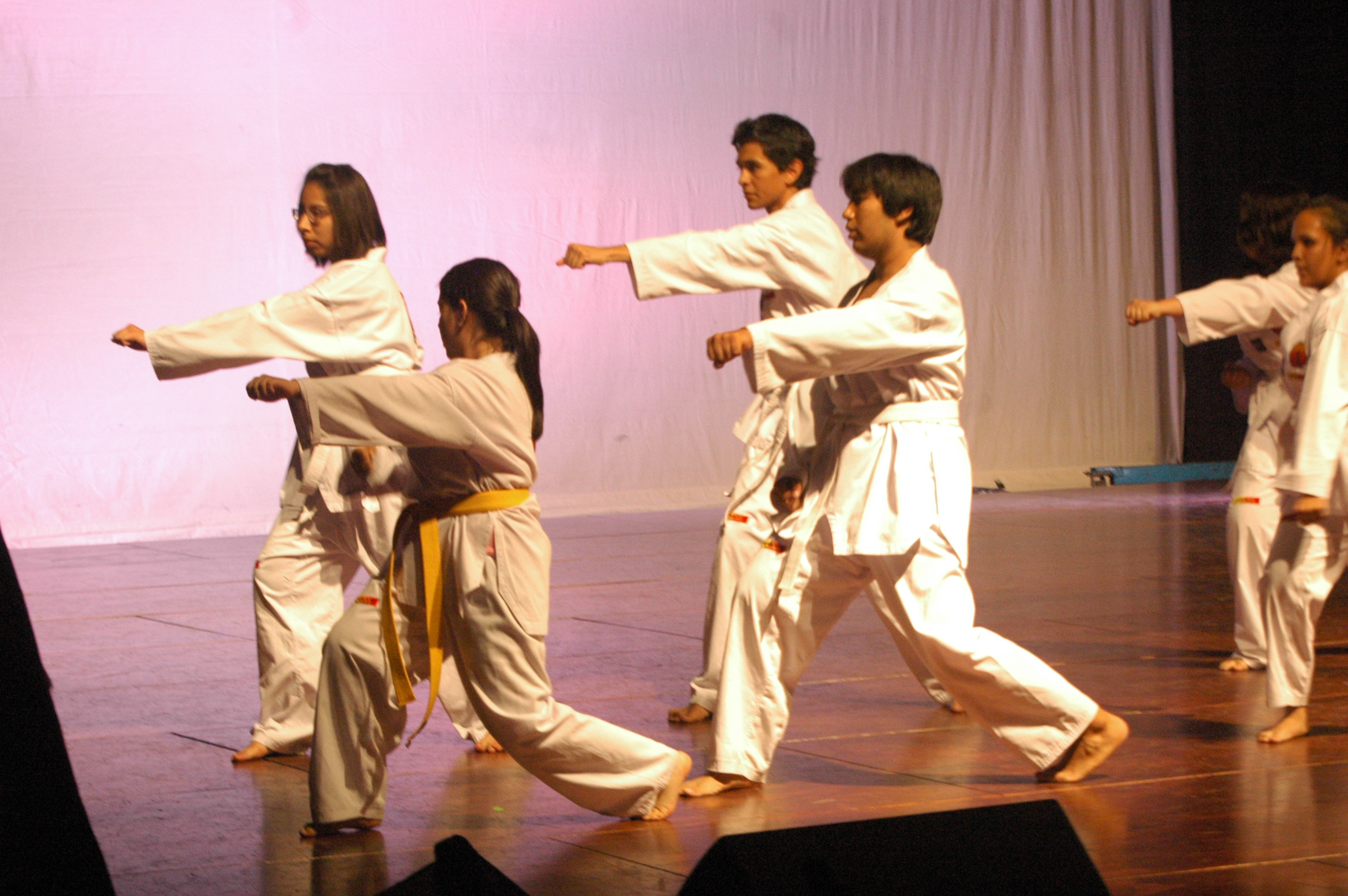
Exhibition of taekwondo students at the Monterrey Institute of Technology and Higher Education, Mexico City

Taekwondo ranks vary from style to style and are not standardized. For junior ranks, levels are indicated by a number paired with the term geup (급; 級; geup, also spelled gup, or kup), which represents belt color. A belt color may also feature a stripe. Ranks typically count down from higher numbers to lower ones. For senior ranks ("black belt" ranks), each rank is called a dan 단 (段) or "degree" and counts upwards.

Students must pass tests to advance ranks, and promotions happen at a progressive rate depending on the school.

Titles can also come with ranks. For example, in the International Taekwon-Do Federation, instructors holding 1st to 3rd dan are called boosabum (부사범; 副師範; "assistant instructor"), those holding 4th to 6th dan are called sabum (사범; 師範; "instructor"), those holding 7th to 8th dan are called sahyun (사현; 師賢; "master"), and those holding 9th dan are called saseong (사성; 師聖; "grandmaster").

In WT/Kukki-Taekwondo, instructors holding 1st to 3rd dan are considered assistant instructors (kyosa-nim), are not yet allowed to issue ranks, and are generally thought of as still having much to learn. Instructors who hold a 4th to 6th dan are considered master instructors (sabum-nim), and are allowed to grade students to ranks beneath their own. Rules of Taekwondo Promotion Test, Kukkiwon Those who hold a 7th–9th dan are considered Grandmasters. Kukkiwon-issued ranks also hold an age requirement, with grandmaster ranks requiring an age of over forty.

== Forms (patterns) ==
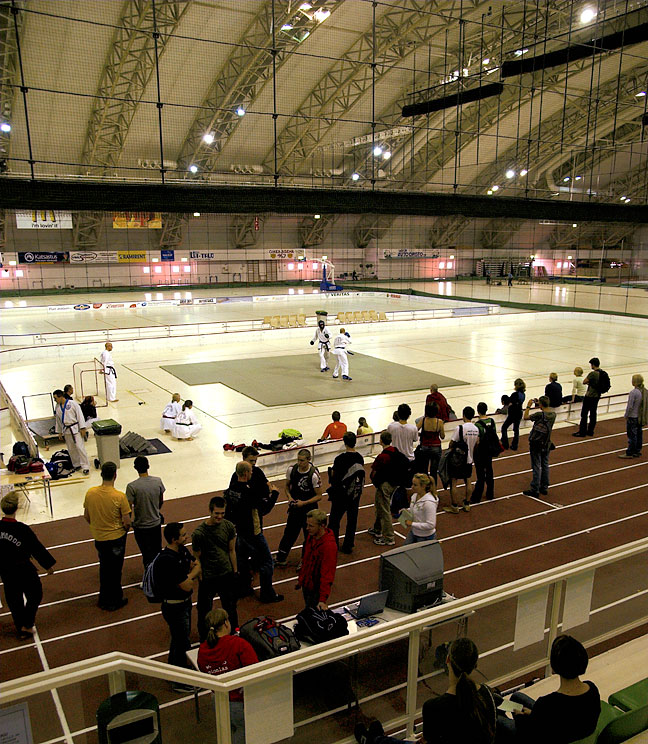
A demonstration at Kuopio-halli in Kuopio, Finland

Three Korean terms may be used with reference to taekwondo forms or patterns. These forms are equivalent to kata in karate.

- Hyeong (sometimes hyung; 형; 形 or 型) is the term usually used in Traditional Taekwondo (i.e., 1950s–1960s styles of Korean martial arts).
- Poomsae (sometimes pumsae or formerly poomse; 품새; 品勢) is the term officially used by Kukkiwon/WT-style and ATA-style Taekwondo.
- Teul (officially romanized as tul; 틀) is the term usually used in ITF/Chang Hon-style Taekwondo.

A hyeong is a systematic, prearranged sequence of martial techniques that is performed either with or without the use of a weapon.

Different taekwondo styles and associations (ATA, ITF, GTF, WT, etc.) use different taekwondo forms.

== Philosophy ==
Different styles of Taekwondo adopt different philosophical underpinnings. Many of these underpinnings however refer back to the Five Commandments of the Hwarang as a historical referent. For example, Choi Hong-hi expressed his philosophical basis for taekwondo as the Five Tenets of Taekwondo:

- Courtesy (예의; 禮儀; yeui)
- Integrity (염치; 廉恥; yeomchi)
- Perseverance (인내; 忍耐; innae)
- Self-control (극기; 克己; geukgi)
- Indomitable spirit (백절불굴; 百折不屈; baekjeolbulgul)

These tenets are further articulated in a taekwondo oath, also authored by Choi:

- I shall observe the tenets of taekwondo
- I shall respect the instructor and seniors
- I shall never misuse taekwondo
- I shall be a champion of freedom and justice
- I shall build a more peaceful world

Modern ITF organizations have continued to update and expand upon this philosophy.

The World Taekwondo Federation (WTF) also refers to the commandments of the Hwarang in the articulation of its taekwondo philosophy. Like the ITF philosophy, it centers on the development of a peaceful society as one of the overarching goals for the practice of taekwondo. The WT's stated philosophy is that this goal can be furthered by adoption of the Hwarang spirit, by behaving rationally ("education in accordance with the reason of heaven"), and by recognition of the philosophies embodied in the taegeuk (the yin and the yang, i.e., "the unity of opposites") and the sam taegeuk (understanding change in the world as the interactions of the heavens, the Earth, and Man). The philosophical position articulated by the Kukkiwon is likewise based on the Hwarang tradition.

=== Theory of power ===
The emphasis on speed and agility is a defining characteristic of taekwondo and has its origins in analyses undertaken by Choi Hong-hi. The results of that analysis are known by ITF practitioners as Choi's Theory of Power. Choi based his understanding of power on biomechanics and Newtonian physics as well as Chinese martial arts. For example, Choi observed that the kinetic energy of a strike increases quadratically with the speed of the strike, but increases only linearly with the mass of the striking object. In other words, speed is more important than size in terms of generating power. This principle was incorporated into the early design of taekwondo and is still used.

Choi also advocated a "relax/strike" principle for taekwondo; in other words, between blocks, kicks, and strikes the practitioner should relax the body, then tense the muscles only while performing the technique. It is believed that the relax/strike principle increases the power of the technique, by conserving the body's energy. He expanded on this principle with his advocacy of the "sine wave" technique. This involves raising one's centre of gravity between techniques, then lowering it as the technique is performed, producing the up-and-down movement from which the term "sine wave" is derived.

The components of the Theory of Power include:

- Reaction Force: the principle that as the striking limb is brought forward, other parts of the body should be brought backwards in order to provide more power to the striking limb. As an example, if the right leg is brought forward in a roundhouse kick, the right arm is brought backwards to provide the reaction force.
- Concentration: the principle of bringing as many muscles as possible to bear on a strike, concentrating the area of impact into as small an area as possible.
- Equilibrium: maintaining a correct centre-of-balance throughout a technique.
- Breath Control: the idea that during a strike one should exhale, with the exhalation concluding at the moment of impact.
- Mass: the principle of bringing as much of the body to bear on a strike as possible; again using the turning kick as an example, the idea would be to rotate the hip as well as the leg during the kick in order to take advantage of the hip's additional mass in terms of providing power to the kick.
- Speed: as previously noted, the speed of execution of a technique in taekwondo is deemed to be even more important than mass in terms of providing power.

== Competitions ==
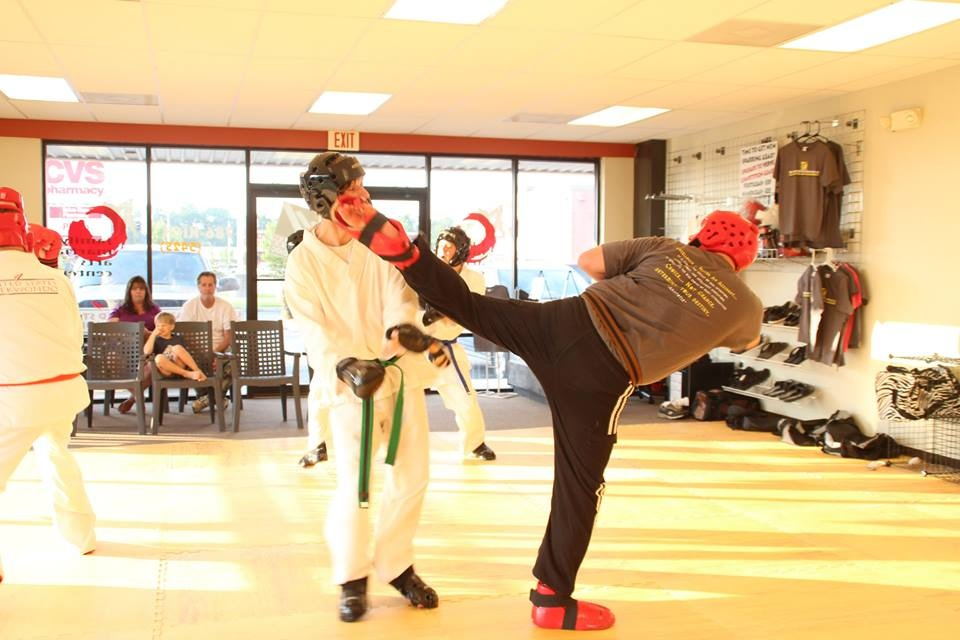
Sparring in a taekwondo class

Taekwondo competitions typically involve sparring, breaking, and patterns; some tournaments also include special events such as demonstration teams and self-defense (hosinsul). In Olympic taekwondo competitions, however, only sparring (using WT competition rules) is performed.

There are two kinds of competition sparring: point sparring, in which all strikes are light contact and the clock is stopped when a point is scored; and Olympic sparring, where all strikes are full contact and the clock continues when points are scored.

=== World Taekwondo ===
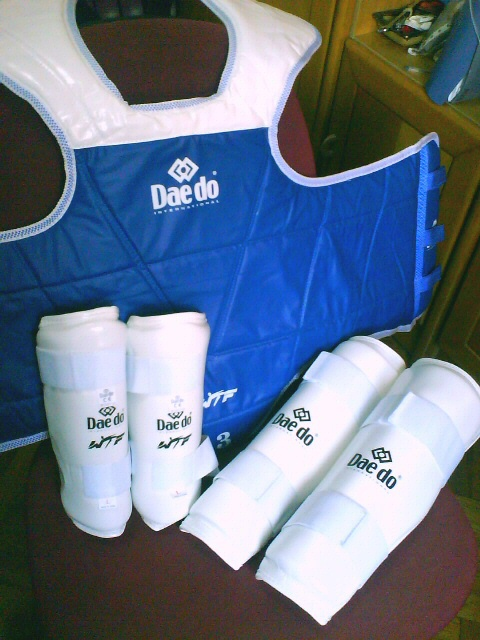
Official WT trunk protector (hogu), forearm guards and shin guards

Under World Taekwondo (WT, formerly WTF) and Olympic rules, sparring is a full-contact event, employing a continuous scoring system where the fighters are allowed to continue after scoring each technique, taking place between two competitors in either an area measuring 8 meters square or an octagon of similar size. Competitors are matched within gender and weight division—eight divisions for World Championships that are condensed to four for the Olympics. A win can occur by points, or if one competitor is unable to continue (knockout). However, there are several decisions that can lead to a win, as well, including superiority, withdrawal, disqualification, or even a referee's punitive declaration. Each match consists of three two-minute rounds, with one minute rest between rounds, though these are often abbreviated or shortened for some junior and regional tournaments. Competitors must wear a hogu, head protector, shin pads, foot socks, forearm guards, hand gloves, a mouthpiece, and a groin cup. Tournaments sanctioned by national governing bodies or the WT, including the Olympics and World Championship, use electronic hogus, electronic foot socks, and electronic head protectors to register and determine scoring techniques, with human judges used to assess and score technical (spinning) techniques and score punches.

Points are awarded for permitted techniques delivered to the legal scoring areas as determined by an electronic scoring system, which assesses the strength and location of the contact. The only techniques allowed are kicks (delivering a strike using an area of the foot below the ankle), punches (delivering a strike using the closed fist), and pushes. In some smaller tournaments, and in the past, points were awarded by three corner judges using electronic scoring tallies. All major national and international tournaments have moved fully (as of 2017) to electronic scoring, including the use of electronic headgear. This limits corner judges to scoring only technical points and punches. Some believe that the new electronic scoring system reduces controversy concerning judging decisions, but this technology is still not universally accepted. In particular, the move to electronic headgear has replaced controversy over judging with controversy over how the technology has changed the sport. Because the headgear is not able to determine if a kick was a correct taekwondo technique, and the pressure threshold for sensor activation for headgear is kept low for safety reasons, athletes who improvised ways of placing their foot on their opponents head were able to score points, regardless of how true to taekwondo those techniques were.

Techniques are divided into three categories: scoring techniques (such as a kick to the hogu), permitted but non-scoring techniques (such as a kick that strikes an arm), and not-permitted techniques (such as a kick below the waist).

- A punch that makes strong contact with the opponent's hogu scores a point. The punch must be a straight punch with arm extended; jabs, hooks, uppercuts, etc. are permitted but do not score. Punches to the head are not allowed.
- A regular kick (no turning or spinning) to the hogu scores 2 points.
- A regular kick (no turning or spinning) to the head scores 3 points
- A technical kick (a kick that involves turning or spinning) to the hogu scores 4 points.
- A technical kick to the head scores 6 points.
  - As of October 2010, 4 points were awarded if a turning kick was used to execute this attack. As of January 2026 its has been changed to 6 points

The referee can give penalties at any time for rule-breaking, such as hitting an area not recognized as a target, usually the legs or neck. Penalties, called "Gam-jeom" are counted as an addition of one point for the opposing contestant. Following 10 "Gam-jeom" a player is declared the loser by referee's punitive declaration

At the end of three rounds, the competitor with most points wins the match. In the event of a tie, a fourth "sudden death" overtime round, sometimes called a "Golden Point", is held to determine the winner after a one-minute rest period. In this round, the first competitor to score a point wins the match. If there is no score in the additional round, the winner is decided by superiority, as determined by the refereeing officials or number of fouls committed during that round. If a competitor has a 20-point lead at the end of the second round or achieves a 20-point lead at any point in the third round, then the match is over and that competitor is declared the winner.

In addition to sparring competition, World Taekwondo sanctions competition in poomsae or forms, although this is not an Olympic event. Single competitors perform a designated pattern of movements, and are assessed by judges for accuracy (accuracy of movements, balance, precision of details) and presentation (speed and power, rhythm, energy), both of which receive numerical scores, with deductions made for errors. Pair and team competition is also recognized, where two or more competitors perform the same form at the same time. In addition to competition with the traditional forms, there is experimentation with freestyle forms that allow more creativity.

=== International Taekwon-Do Federation ===
Common styles of ITF point sparring equipment

The International Taekwon-Do Federation (ITF) has sparring rules similar to the WT's, but they differ in some ways:

- Hand attacks to the head are allowed.
- The competition is not full contact, and excessive contact is not allowed.
- Competitors are penalized with disqualification if they injure their opponent and he can no longer continue (knockout).
- The scoring system is:
  - 1 point for Punch to the body or head.
  - 2 points for Jumping kick to the body or kick to the head, or a jumping punch to the head
  - 3 points for Jumping kick to the head
- The competition area is 9×9 meters for international events.

Competitors do not wear the hogu (although they are required to wear approved foot and hand protection equipment, as well as optional head guards). This scoring system varies between individual organisations within the ITF; for example, in the TAGB, punches to the head or body score 1 point, kicks to the body score 2 points, and kicks to the head score 3 points.

A continuous point system is utilized in ITF competition, where the fighters are allowed to continue after scoring a technique. Excessive contact is generally not allowed according to the official ruleset, and judges penalize any competitor with disqualification if they injure their opponent and he can no longer continue (although these rules vary between ITF organizations). At the end of two minutes (or some other specified time), the competitor with more scoring techniques wins.

Fouls in ITF sparring include: attacking a fallen opponent, leg sweeping, holding/grabbing, or intentional attack to a target other than the opponent.

ITF competitions also feature performances of patterns, breaking, and 'special techniques' (where competitors perform prescribed board breaks at great heights).

=== Multi-discipline competition ===
Some organizations deliver multi-discipline competitions; for example, the British Student Taekwondo Federation's inter-university competitions, which have included separate WT rules sparring, ITF rules sparring, Kukkiwon patterns and Chang-Hon patterns events run in parallel since 1992.

=== Other organizations ===
USTA Web This is the United States Taekwondo Alliance |url=https://ustaweb.org Amateur Athletic Union (AAU) competitions are very similar, except that different styles of pads and gear are allowed.

== List of competitions ==
=== World Taekwondo competitions ===
World Taekwondo (WT) directly sanctions the following competitions:

- World Taekwondo Poomsae Championships
- World Taekwondo Championships
- World Para Taekwondo Championships (since 2009)
- World Taekwondo Cadet Championships
- World Taekwondo Junior Championships
- World Taekwondo Team Championships
- World Taekwondo Para Championships
- World Taekwondo Grand Prix
- World Taekwondo Grand Slam
- World Taekwondo Beach Championships
- Olympic Games
- Paralympic Games (debut in 2020 Tokyo Paralympics)

=== Other tournaments ===
These feature WT Taekwondo only:

- African Games
- Asian Games
- European Games
- Pacific Games
- Pan American Games
- Universiade

Taekwondo is also an optional sport at the Commonwealth Games.

=== Weight divisions ===
The following weight divisions are in effect due to the WT and ITF tournament rules and regulations:

Olympics
Male	Female
−58 kg	−49 kg
−68 kg	−57 kg
−80 kg	−67 kg
+80 kg	+67 kg

WT Male Championships
Juniors	Adults
−45 kg	−54 kg
−48 kg	−54 kg
−51 kg	−54 kg
−55 kg	−54 kg
−59 kg	−58 kg
−63 kg	−63 kg
−68 kg	−68 kg
−73 kg	−74 kg
−78 kg	−74 kg
+78 kg	−80 kg
+78 kg	−87 kg
+78 kg	+87 kg

WT Female Championships
Juniors	Adults
−42 kg	−46 kg
−44 kg	−46 kg
−46 kg	−49 kg
−49 kg	−49 kg
−52 kg	−53 kg
−55 kg	−53 kg
−59 kg	−57 kg
−63 kg	−62 kg
−68 kg	−67 kg
+68 kg	−73 kg
+68 kg	+73 kg

ITF Male Championships
Juniors	Adults (18–39 yrs)	Veterans over 40	Veterans over 50
−45 kg	−50 kg	−64 kg	−66 kg
−51 kg	−57 kg	−64 kg	−66 kg
−57 kg	−64 kg	−73 kg	−66 kg
−63 kg	−71 kg	−73 kg	−66 kg
−69 kg	−78 kg	−80 kg	−80 kg
−75 kg	−85 kg	−90 kg	−80 kg
+75 kg	+85 kg	+90 kg	+80 kg

ITF Female Championships
Juniors	Adults (18–39 yrs)	Veterans over 40	Veterans over 50
−40 kg	−45 kg	−54 kg	−60 kg
−46 kg	−51 kg	−54 kg	−60 kg
−52 kg	−57 kg	−61 kg	−60 kg
−58 kg	−63 kg	−61 kg	−60 kg
−64 kg	−69 kg	−68 kg	−75 kg
−70 kg	−75 kg	−75 kg	−75 kg
+70 kg	+75 kg	+75 kg	+75 kg

== Taekwondo Korean terms ==
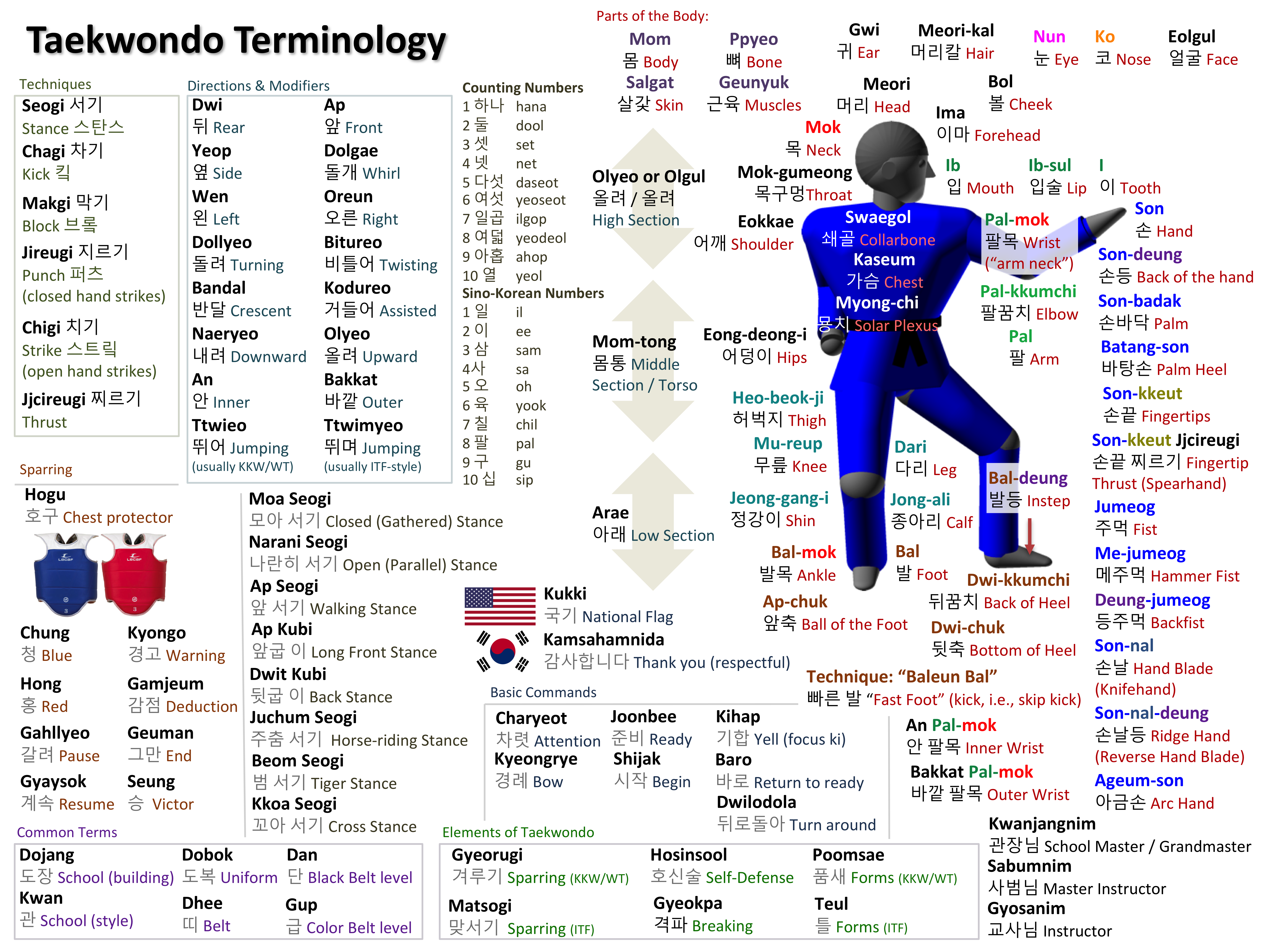
Some common taekwondo terminology and parts of the body

In taekwondo schools—even outside Korea—Korean language commands and vocabulary are often used. Korean numerals may be used as prompts for commands or for counting repetition exercises. Different schools and associations will use different vocabulary, however, and may even refer to entirely different techniques by the same name. As one example, in Kukkiwon/WT-style Taekwondo, the term ap seogi refers to an upright walking stance, while in ITF/Chang Hon-style Taekwondo ap seogi refers to a long, low, front stance. Korean vocabulary commonly used in taekwondo schools includes:

Basic Commands
English	Hangul	Hanja	Revised Romanization
Attention	차렷		Charyeot
Ready	준비	準備	Junbi
Begin	시작	始作	Sijak
Finish / Stop	그만		Geuman
Bow	경례	敬禮	Gyeonglye
Resume / Continue	계속	繼續	Gyesok
Return to ready	바로		Baro
Relax / At ease	쉬어		Swieo
Rest / Take a break	휴식	休息	Hyusik
Turn around / About face	뒤로돌아		Dwirodora
Yell	기합	氣合	Gihap
Look / Focus	시선	視線	Siseon
By the count	구령에 맞춰서	口令에 맞춰서	Guryeong-e majchwoseo
Without count	구령 없이	口令 없이	Guryeong eobs-i
Switch feet	발 바꿔		Bal bakkwo
Dismissed	해산	解散	Haesan

Hand Techniques
English	Hangul	Hanja	Revised Romanization
Hand Techniques	수 기	手技	Su gi
Attack / Strike / Hit	공격	攻擊	Gong-gyeog
Strike	치기		Chigi
Block	막기		Magki
Punch/hit	권	拳	Gwon
Punch	지르기		Jireugi
Middle punch	중 권	中拳	Jung gwon
Middle Punch	몸통 지르기		Momtong jireugi
Back fist	갑 권	甲拳 / 角拳	Gab gwon
Back fist	등주먹		Deungjumeog
Knife hand (edge)	수도	手刀	Su Do
Knife hand (edge)	손날		Son Kal
Thrust / spear	관	貫	Gwan
Thrust / spear	찌르기		Jjileugi
Spear hand	관 수	貫手	Gwan su
Spear hand (lit. fingertip)	손끝		Sonkkeut
Ridge hand	역 수도	逆手刀	Yeog su do
Ridge hand (lit. reverse hand blade)	손날등		Sonnaldeung
Hammer fist	권도	拳刀 / 拳槌	Gweon do
Pliers hand	집게 손		Jibge son
Palm heel	장관	掌貫	Jang gwan
Palm heel	바탕손		Batangson
Elbow	팔꿈		Palkkum
Gooseneck	손목 등		Sonmog deung
Side punch	횡진 공격	橫進攻擊	Hoengjin gong gyeog
Side punch	옆 지르기		Yeop jileugi
Mountain block	산 막기	山막기	San maggi
One finger fist	일 지 권	一指拳	il ji gwon
1 finger spear hand	일 지관 수	一指貫手	il ji gwan su
2 finger spear hand	이지관수	二指貫手	i ji gwan su
Double back fist	장갑권	長甲拳	Jang gab gwon
Double hammer fist	장 권도	長拳刀	Jang gwon do

Foot Techniques
English	Hangul	Hanja	Revised Romanization
Foot Techniques	족기	足技	Jog gi
Kick	차기		Chagi
Front snap kick	앞 차기		Ap chagi
...also Front snap kick	앞 차넣기		Ap chaneohgi
...also Front snap kick	앞 뻗어 차기		Ap ppeod-eo chagi
Inside-out heel kick or outside crescent kick	안에서 밖으로 차기		An-eseo bakk-eulo chagi
Outside-in heel kick or inside crescent kick	밖에서 안으로 차기		Baggeso aneuro chagi
Stretching front kick	앞 뻗어 올리 기		Ap ppeod-eo olli gi
Roundhouse kick	돌려 차기		Dollyeo chagi
...also Roundhouse kick			Ap dollyeo chagi
Side kick	옆 차기		Yeop chagi
...also Snap Side kick	옆 뻗어 차기		Yeop ppeod-eo chagi
Hook kick	후려기 차기		Hulyeogi chagi
...also hook kick	후려 차기		Huryeo chagi
Back kick	뒤 차기		Dwi chagi
...also Spin Back kick	뒤 돌려 차기		Dwi dollyeo chagi
Spin hook kick	뒤 돌려 후려기 차기		Dwi dollyeo hulyeogi chagi
Knee strike	무릎 차기		Mu reup chagi
Reverse round kick	빗 차기		Bit chagi

Stances
English	Hangul (한글)	Hanja (한자/漢字)	Revised Romanization
Stances	자세	姿勢	Seogi (stance) or Jase (posture)
Ready stance	준비 자세	準備 姿勢	Junbi seogi (or jase)
Front Stance	전굴 자세	前屈 姿勢	Jeongul seogi (or jase)
Back Stance	후굴 자세	後屈 姿勢	Hugul seogi (or jase)
Horse-riding Stance	기마 자세	騎馬 姿勢	Gima seogi (or jase)
...also Horse-riding Stance	기마립 자세	騎馬立 姿勢	Gimalip seogi (or jase)
...also Horse-riding Stance	주춤 서기		Juchum seogi
Side Stance	사고립 자세	四股立 姿勢	Sagolib seogi (or jase)
Cross legged stance	교차 립 자세	交(叉/差)立 姿勢	Gyocha lib seogi (or jase)

Technique Direction
English	Hangul	Hanja	Revised Romanization
Moving forward	전진	推進	Jeonjin
Backing up / retreat	후진	後進	Hujin
Sideways/laterally	횡진	橫進	Hoengjin
Reverse (hand/foot)	역진	逆進	Yeogjin
Lower	하단	下段	Hadan
Middle	중단	中段	Jungdan
Upper	상단	上段	Sangdan
Two handed	쌍수	雙手	Ssangsu
Both hands	양수	兩手	Yangsu
Lowest	최 하단	最下段	Choe hadan
Right side	오른 쪽		Oleun jjog
Left side	왼 쪽		Oen jjog
Other side/Twist	틀어		Teul-eo
Inside-outside	안에서 밖으로		An-eseo bakk-eulo
Outside inside	밖에서 안으로		Bakk-eseo an-eulo
Jumping / 2nd level	이단	二段	Idan
Hopping / Skipping	뜀을		Ttwim-eul
Double kick	두 발		Du bal
Combo kick	연속	連續	Yeonsog
Same foot	같은 발		Gat-eun bal

Titles
English	Hangul	Hanja	Revised Romanization
Founder/President	관장 님	館長님	Gwanjang nim
Master instructor	사범 님	師範님	Sabeom nim
Teacher	교사 님	敎師님	Gyosa nim
Senior Student	선배	先輩	Seon bae
Black Belt	단	段	Dan
Student or Color Belt	급	級	Geup
Master level	고단자	高段者	Godanja

Other/Miscellaneous
English	Hangul	Hanja	Revised Romanization
School	관	館	Gwan (kwan)
Country Flag	국기	國旗	Guggi
Salute the flag	국기 배례	國旗 拜禮	Guggi baerye
Pay respect / bow	경례	敬禮	Gyeongnye
Moment of silence	묵념	默念	Mugnyeom
Sit down!	앉아!		Anj-a!
Thank you	감사합니다	感謝합니다	Gamsa habnida
Informal thank you	고맙습니다		Gomabseubnida
You're welcome	천만에요		Cheonman-eyo
Uniform	도복	道服	Dobok
Belt	띠	帶	Tti
Studio / School / Gym	도장	道場	Dojang
Test	심사	審査	Simsa
Self Defense	호신술	護身術	Hosinsul
Sparring (Kukkiwon/WT-style)	겨루기		Gyeorugi
...also Sparring (Chang Hon/ITF-style)	맞서기		Matseogi
...also Sparring	대련	對練	Daelyeon
Free sparring	자유 대련	自由 對練	Jayu daelyeon
Ground Sparring	좌 대련	座 對練	Jwa daelyeon
One step sparring	일 수식 대련	一數式 對練	il su sig daelyeon
Three step sparring	삼 수식 대련	三數式 對練	Sam su sig daelyeon
Board Breaking	격파	擊破	Gyeog pa

== See also ==
- Para Taekwondo
- Tae Kwon Do Life Magazine
- Taekwondo student oath
- Taekwondo in India
