= International Taekwon-Do Federation =

Sports organization founded in 1966

- 국제 태권도 연맹
- Abbreviation: ITF
- Formation: 22 March 1966; 60 years ago
- Founder: Choi Hong Hi
- Type: Martial Art
- Region served: Worldwide

The International Taekwon-Do Federation (ITF) is an international ″Taekwon-Do″ organization founded on March 22, 1966, by Choi Hong Hi (Korean: 최홍희) in Seoul, South Korea. The ITF was founded to promote and encourage the growth of the Korean martial art of Taekwon-Do.

The ITF's main functions include coordinating and approving tournaments and seminars, setting standards for teaching (patterns, sparring, destruction), collaborating with affiliated member organizations, and providing services members in regard to rank and certifications.

After Choi's death in 2002, there was controversy around the election of his successor that led to multiple organizations claiming the ITF mantle.

== History ==
A few years after the end of the Korean War, leading representatives of the ″Kwan″ resumed their efforts toward reunification. Between 1959 and 1961, several organizations were established for this purpose. Of this particular significance in this context were a group consisting primarily of members of the ″Chung Do Kwan″ under the leadership of Choi Hong Hi and the "Unified Consolidation Committee", which was established in September 1961.

In 1959, Choi Hong Hi founded an organzation called the ″Korean Taekwon-Do Association″ (KTA) to bring the 9 Kwans in South Korea under one umbrella. He served as its first president.

During the 1960s, the KTA assembled the twelve first Korean martial masters of the KTA to promote Taekwon-Do throughout the world.

On March 22, 1966, the ITF was founded by General Choi Hong Hi in Seoul, South Korea, with nine associations from Korea, Vietnam, Malaysia, Singapore, West Germany, USA, Turkey and Egypt, after he had left the KTA due to international organizational politics.

In 1972, following political disagrrements with South Korean President Park Chung-hee, Choi went into exile to Toronto, Canada, and taking his ITF with him.

The leaders of the nine Kwans from the KTA then formed a new group called ″Taekwondo″, which incorporated the fighting styles they practiced, such as Tang Soo Do, Kong Soo Do, Shudokan Karate and the South Korean Government established the World Taekwondo Federation (WTF) to promote their ″Taekwondo″ globally as an Olympic competitive sport.

Choi Hong Hi established the new headquarters of the ITF in Vienna, Austria and the organization settled there. In the years that followed, many of the founding masters of the ITF and several other instructors left the organization to form their own independent organizations following disagreements with Choi, mainly because Choi Hong Hi also wanted North Korea to be a part of the ITF.

At the 2001 ITF Congress, ITF Secretary General Master Choi Jung hwa was democratically elected president of the ITF for a six-year term. Choi Jung Hwa suggested that his father remain in office for another two years and that he would then take over for the remaining four years. General Choi reversed this decision, and he was asked to remain in office. Choi Jung Hwa and his ITF team rejected the resolution of the special convention in Vienna and continued to insist that Master Choi Jung Hwa was the only legitimate ITF president.

=== Death of the founder and split of the ITF ===
After the death of General Choi Hong Hi in June 2002, the International Taekwon-Do Federation experienced a succession dispute. Different groups of members recognized different successors to the presidency, leading to the formation of separate organizations that each claimed continuity with the ITF founded by Choi.

One group recognized Chang Ung as president and remained associated with the Vienna-based ITF structure. This organization belongs to North Korea was later led by Ri Yong Son. It lists the ITF headquarters at Draugasse 3 in Vienna, Austria, and describes the headquarters as established in 1985 by Choi Hong Hi.

A second group rejected Chang Ung's succession and elected Trần Triệu Quân as president at a members' congress.

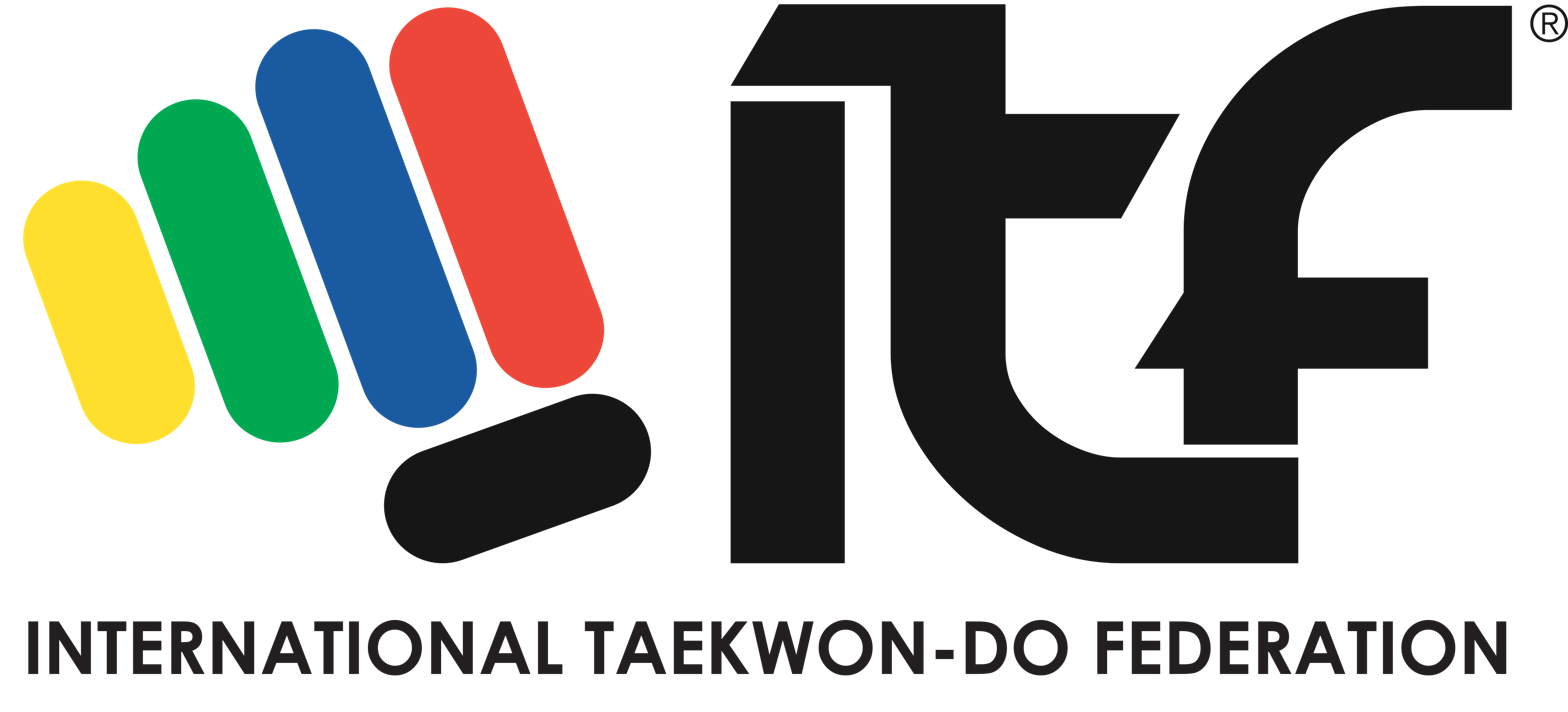
Logo of the ITF organization associated with Paul Weiler

This organization was later led by Pablo Trajtenberg and, from 2019, by Paul Weiler. It subsequently operated independently, with its main administrative office associated with Benidorm, Spain, and its legal address listed in Lausanne, Switzerland.

A third group supported Choi Jung Hwa, the son of Choi Hong Hi, who had previously been presented by some members as a successor. Choi Jung Hwa's organization was originally based in Toronto, Canada. Its administration later listed a contact address in London, England.

The resulting organizations operate independently, with their own leadership structures, member associations, championships, and administrative arrangements. Each claims to preserve the teachings and legacy of Choi Hong Hi.

== Patterns ==
Patterns, or teul (틀) in Korean, originally called hyeong (형), form an important aspect of training in Taekwon-Do. They are equivalent to the kata in karate. The majority of the patterns starts with a defensive move, which emphasizes Taekwon-Do's defensive nature. All of the patterns start and end at the same location. This ensures that the practitioners' stances are the correct length, width, and in the proper direction. Additionally, students are taught to understand the purpose of each movement and recognize how each motion connects to theories of power.

There are 24 patterns in the official ITF syllabus; this is symbolic of the 24 hours in a day. One additional pattern, Ko-Dang (or Go-Dang), was retired/replaced by Juche in 1986 by General Choi Hong Hi. The names of these patterns typically refer either to events in Korean history or to important people in Korean history. Elements of the patterns may also be historical references, such as the number of moves, the diagram, the way the pattern ends, and so on.

Patterns (tul) are performed in accordance with "The Encyclopedia of Taekwon-Do" in 15 volumes written by General Choi Hong Hi, the latest edition being from 1999 (later editions have been published, but the 1999 editions were the last General Choi Hong Hi was directly involved with). This comprehensive work contains 15 volumes with volumes 8 to 15 dedicated to the 24 patterns and containing descriptions of the pattern movements as well as pictures showing possible applications of some of the movements. There is also the book entitled "The Korean Art of Self Defense" (the 1999 edition, the latest used by ITF under Chang Ung), also known as the Condensed Encyclopedia, written by General Choi Hong Hi. This is a single condensed encyclopedia of approximately 770 pages with a section dedicated to the 24 original patterns.

There are also three fundamental exercises, named Saju Jirugi (Four Direction Punch), Saju Makgi (Four Direction Block) and Saju Tulgi (Four Direction Thrust). Saju Jirugi and Saju Makgi are basic defence exercises taught to beginners of the martial art. Saju Tulgi is less well known and is generally taught to 2nd Kup students just prior to Hwa-Rang. Saju Tulgi is not presented in the Condensed Encyclopedia but is present in the 15 Volume Encyclopedia (see: Volume 10, page 122).

== Sparring ==
Common styles of ITF point sparring equipment

The International Taekwon-Do Federation's sparring rules are:

- Hand attacks to the head are allowed.
- The ITF scoring system is:
- One (1) point will be awarded for:
  - Hand attack directed to the head or body.
- Two (2) points will be awarded for:
  - Kick directed to the body.
- Three (3) points will be awarded for:
  - Kick to the head.
- The competition area is typically a 10×10 meter square in international championships.

Competitors do not wear the hogu (although they are required to wear approved foot and hand protection equipment, as well as head guards). This scoring system varies between the different ITF organizations.

A continuous point system is utilized in ITF competition, where the fighters are allowed to continue after scoring a technique. Full-force blows are not allowed, and knockouts result in a disqualification of the attacker; although these rules vary between ITF organizations. At the end of two minutes (or some other specified time) the competitor with the person with the most points wins.

Fouls in ITF sparring include heavy contact, attacking a fallen opponent, leg sweeping, holding/grabbing, intentional attack to a target other than allowed (for example below the belt, attacks to the back).

ITF competitions also feature performances of patterns, power breaking, and 'special techniques' (where competitors perform prescribed board breaks at great heights).

ITF competition sparring rounds are 2 minutes, and, in national and international levels of competition, they hold two rounds each 2 minutes with a one-minute rest in between. Certain rules are no strikes below the belt, no elbow strikes, brawling, no falling down, no going outside of the ring, hit to the groin and knee strike are not allowed. The ring is an 8x8 meter ring marked by square mats or tape instead of a traditional style kickboxing rings with ropes. It has no sides allowing the fighter to move out of bounds. Whenever a fighter creates an infraction of the rules the center referee will issue a warning to the fighter who created the infraction. 3 warnings equals a minus point. If a fighter uses excessive contact, he or she will be given a foul, which is an automatic minus point; three fouls in a bout results in disqualification. ITF Taekwon-Do is fought in continuous point sparring. Four corner referees score the fights in each of the corners in the square ring. After the fight, each corner referee votes for which ever fighter has the most points and a winner is declared. In the case of a draw the fighters go to a one-minute overtime round. If there is another draw the fighters go to a sudden death round where the fighter who scores first is declared the winner. In the sudden death round, there is no time limit. Some matches are quick with a few seconds, and some go on for 10 minutes!

The official rules for ITF sparring competition are available at the ITF website.

== Ranks ==
The ITF ranking system consists of six solid colour belts; white, yellow, green, blue, red, and black.

Coloured belt ranks are called in English grades and in Korean geup (급) (often romanized as gup or kup), whereas black belt ranks are called ranks/dan (단):

Grade Level	Description
10th geup	White – Signifies innocence, as that of the beginning student who has no previous knowledge of taekwon-do – 3 months min requirement.
9th geup	White with yellow tip. 3 months min. requirement
8th geup	Yellow – Signifies the earth from which a plant sprouts and takes root as the foundation of taekwon-do is being laid – 4 months minimum requirement.
7th geup	Yellow with green tip. 4 months minimum requirement
6th geup	Green – Signifies the plant's growth as taekwon-do skills begin to develop – 4 months minimum requirement.
5th geup	Green with blue tip. 4 months minimum requirement
4th geup	Blue – Signifies the Heaven towards which the plant matures into a towering tree as training in taekwon-do progresses – 4 months minimum requirement.
3rd geup	Blue with red tip – 5 months minimum requirement
2nd geup	Red – Signifies danger, cautioning the student to exercise control and warning the opponent to stay away – 6 months minimum requirement.
1st geup	Red with black tip. 1 year requirement
1st dan	Black – Opposite of white, therefore signifying maturity and proficiency in taekwon-do; also indicates the wearer's imperviousness to darkness and fear. (must remain at this rank at least one and a half (1½) years). The practitioner is given the title of "Bosabum-nim"
2nd dan	Assistant Instructor (must remain at this rank at least 2 years)
3rd dan	Assistant Instructor (must remain at this rank at least 3 years)
4th dan	International Instructor (must remain at this rank at least 4 years). Minimum age is 22. The practitioner becomes a "Sabum-Nim"
5th dan	Instructor (must remain at this rank at least 5 years)
6th dan	Instructor (must remain at this rank at least 6 years)
7th dan	Master Instructor (must remain at this rank at least 7 years). The practitioner becomes a "Sakhyo-nim". Minimum age is 40
8th dan	Master Instructor (must remain at this rank at least 8 years)
9th dan	Grand Master - "Sasung-nim". Minimum age is 60

The reason for nine black belt degrees is that the number nine is not only the highest of the single-digit numbers, but also is the number of three multiplied by three. In the Orient, three is one of the more esteemed numbers. The Chinese character for 3 is three horizontal lines, one above the other: 三. The bottom line represents earth; the middle line represents mortals; the upper line represents heaven. It was believed that a man who could unite the three realms in himself, would aspire or be reborn into a king; this is shown by the vertical line connecting the realms in the character for king: 王.

=== Black belt promotion ===
Up to 8th dan, all ranks require the student to perform a test of all skills and knowledge up to their rank to be promoted. 9th dan may be awarded with consent of the promotion committee with no physical test required, due to the nature and responsibilities of a master no longer being centered on the physical development. However, if the recipient desires, a demonstration may be performed. 9th dan (being the highest) can only be awarded when the special committee examines and reaches a unanimous consent.

According to the ITF Encyclopedia, 4th dan may grade students up to 1st dan. A 6th degree International Instructor may grade students up to 3rd degree, while a 7th degree Master may grade students up to 4th degree. An 8th degree Master may grade students up to 6th degree. A 9th degree Grand Master may grade students up to 7th degree. Promotion to 8th & 9th dan must be done by the ITF's Master Promotion Committee.

== See also ==
- Choi Hong Hi
- Rhee Ki Ha
- Choi Jung Hwa
- Trân Triêu Quân
