= Haeng Ung Lee =

American taekwondoin (1936–2000)

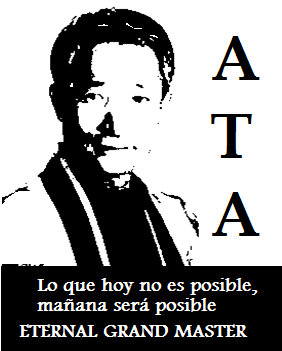
- Born: July 20, 1936; Manchukuo
- Died: October 5, 2000 (aged 64); Little Rock, Arkansas, US
- Style: Songahm Taekwondo

- Haeng Ung Lee
- Hangul: 이행웅
- Hanja: 李幸雄
- RR: I Haengung
- MR: I Haengung

Haeng Ung ("H.U.") Lee (July 20, 1936 – October 5, 2000) was the co-founder and first Grand Master of the American Taekwondo Association.

== Career ==
H.U. Lee was born in Manchukuo, a puppet state of the Empire of Japan in 1936. After World War II, his family relocated to South Korea, where Lee began his martial arts training in 1953, and earned his first degree black belt in 1954. In 1956, Lee entered the Korean army as a trainer for special troops. He spent this time as part of an intelligence unit on Baengnyoung Island. After three years, he retired and opened a taekwondo school at Osan Air Base. There, he met Richard Reed, who would later be the sponsor to his emigration to the United States in 1962. Lee moved to Omaha, Nebraska, where in 1969 he co-founded the American Taekwondo Association. Omaha remained the organization's headquarters until Lee relocated it to Little Rock, Arkansas in 1977. H.U. Lee developed the discipline of Songham Taekwondo in 1983. And in 1990, the ATA Master's Council awarded Lee the rank of 9th degree black belt and the title of "Grand Master."

== Awards ==
Haeng Ung Lee was an active participant in charity work, and the ATA provided funding towards numerous organizations such as the Muscular Dystrophy Association, the Susan G. Komen Race for the Cure, Arkansas Children's Hospital, and Arkansas Special Olympics. In 1991, he established the H.U. Lee Scholarship Foundation to provide funding towards active college students. H.U. Lee has additionally received several awards for his works and contributions, including, but not limited to, Key of the City Awards from Omaha, Nebraska; Corpus Christi, Texas; Little Rock, Arkansas; Evansville, Indiana; Tallahassee, Florida; and Panama City, Florida. He also received the Kaleidoscope Award in 1994 and the Crystal Award in 1996 from the Little Rock Convention and Visitor's Bureau. Lee has also been inducted into the Arkansas Sports Hall of Fame.

== Death ==
On October 5, 2000, Lee died of lung cancer. About 3,000 people attended his funeral in Little Rock, Arkansas, and President Bill Clinton sent his condolences to Little Rock Mayor Jim Dailey. Lee's brother Soon-ho was later promoted to 9th degree Grand Master. H.U. Lee's widow, Sun C. Lee, received her late husband's shares in the company and became the new chairman of the board of the ATA. H.U. Lee was posthumously promoted to 10th degree black belt, and awarded the title "Eternal Grand Master". He is the first ever to attain this rank in the ATA. In 2007, some of Lee's heirs decided to give a tribute back to Lee's home in the United States, and arranged to have a traditional Korean gate built in Korea and shipped to Little Rock. This cost about $1.4 million, and the gate itself weighs about 8 tons. This gate stands at the end of the Main Street Bridge in the heart of Little Rock, Arkansas, representing a symbol of friendship between South Korea and the United States, and as a tribute to martial arts.

== See also ==
- List of taekwondo grandmasters
