= Rhee Taekwon-Do =

Taekwondo school in Australia

Rhee Taekwon-Do (리태권도; 李跆拳道)
- Rhee International Taekwon-Do (Australia) logo
- Date founded: c. 1965
- Country of origin: South Korea
- Founder: Chong Chul Rhee
- Current head: Chong Hyup Rhee
- Arts taught: Taekwondo

Rhee Taekwon-Do (Korean: 리태권도; Hanja: 李跆拳道), also known as Rhee Tae Kwon-Do, Rhee Tae Kwon Do, or Rhee Taekwondo,^{[a]} is a martial art school in Australia^{[b]} teaching the Korean martial art of taekwondo. Its full name is "Rhee International Taekwon-Do (Australia)". Chong Chul Rhee, one of the original masters of taekwondo, founded the school in the mid-1960s. Two of Rhee's brothers, Chong Hyup Rhee and Chong Yoon Rhee, later came to assist him in the 1970s.

C. C. Rhee claims the title 'Father of Australian Taekwondo' and Rhee Taekwon-Do is widely publicised as being Australia's first and biggest taekwondo school. It has at least 294 publicly listed dojang (training halls) in Australia, with perhaps around 1,400 dojang in total at its peak. Several Australian martial art school founders received their foundational taekwondo training in Rhee's school.

Rhee Taekwon-Do is an independent martial art organisation. It was once affiliated with the International Taekwon-Do Federation (ITF),^{[c]} but has had no relation to the World Taekwondo Federation (WTF).^{[d]}

== Founding ==
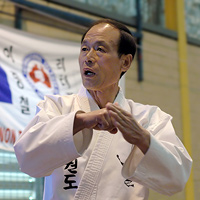
Chong Chul Rhee, one of the twelve original masters of taekwondo, founded Rhee Taekwon-Do in the mid-1960s

Chong Chul Rhee, 8th dan, was the founder and head of Rhee Taekwon-Do. He holds the title 'World Master' and claims the title 'Father of Australian Taekwondo.' Rhee is one of the twelve original masters of taekwondo selected from the South Korean military to develop taekwondo under Choi Hong Hi in the Korea Taekwon-Do Association (KTA).^{[e]} Rhee is a former unarmed combat instructor in the Korean Marines, and helped introduce taekwondo to Southeast Asia (notably in Malaysia and Singapore) before becoming the first taekwondo master sent to Australia by the Republic of Korea.

Rhee has worked towards the reunification of Korea, serving as a member during the third through ninth terms—and as Chairman for the eighth term—of the Oceania Division of the Advisory Council on Democratic and Peaceful Unification. He has also served as Chairman of the Seoul Olympics Supporting Committee and founding President of the Korean Community Hall Construction Supporting Committee. The Republic of Korea awarded Rhee the Dongbaeg Medal (동백장) in 2003 for promoting taekwondo and Korean culture over the past 33 years.

Two of Rhee's brothers, Chong Hyup Rhee and Chong Yoon Rhee, also hold the title of 'Master' in Rhee Taekwon-Do and assist him in managing parts of the school.^{[f]} Chong Hyup Rhee, 7th dan, is in charge of operations in Melbourne. He appears on the right in the school's logo. C. H. Rhee is also one of the twelve original masters of taekwondo, and helped introduce the art of taekwondo to Malaysia and Singapore^{[g]} before arriving in Australia in 1970.^{[h]} He conducts grading examinations in Melbourne and Darwin. Chong Yoon Rhee, 9th dan, is in charge of operations in parts of Sydney. He trained under Nam Tae Hi during the late 1950s, served as a South Korean army officer, and helped introduce the art of taekwondo to Vietnam in the late 1960s. C. Y. Rhee retired from military service at the rank of Major, and moved to Australia in January 1976.

C. C. Rhee and C. H. Rhee are listed as pioneers in Asia (1950s and 1960s) and Australia (1970s) in Chang Keun Choi's list of taekwondo pioneers, while C. Y. Rhee came to Australia some time later.

== Significance ==
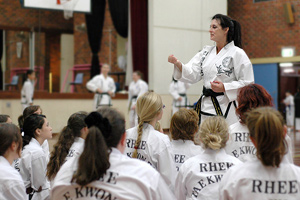
A ladies' training session being conducted by a senior Rhee Taekwon-Do instructor

Rhee Taekwon-Do occupies a prominent place in Australian taekwondo history. This is reflected in three key claims: (1) Chong Chul Rhee is the Father of Australian Taekwondo, (2) Rhee Taekwon-Do is the first taekwondo school in Australia, and (3) Rhee Taekwon-Do is the biggest taekwondo school in Australia. The school has widely publicised these claims since at least the 1980s.

=== Father of Australian Taekwondo ===
Numerous claims have been made on who was the father of Australian Taekwondo by other martial art masters:

- Chan Yong Kim, 9th dan, was the first tang soo do instructor in Australia. He arrived in the early 1960s, sponsored by the Silvertop Taxi Karate Club or the Judo Federation of Australia, and stayed for one or two years before moving overseas. Kim might be considered the first taekwondo instructor in Australia if tang soo do were recognised as taekwondo retrospectively,^{[i]} and so might lay claim to the title. Kim did not establish a taekwondo school in Australia.
- Jack Rozinsky, 9th dan ( Kukkiwon ) and (Jidokwan), founded the Shuto Karate Club in 1963; it later became the Melbourne Taekwondo Centre. As Rozinsky taught tang soo do there, he might be considered the first taekwondo school founder in Australia (again, if tang soo do were recognised as taekwondo retrospectively),^{[i]} and so might lay claim to the title. Rozinsky did not introduce taekwondo outside Victoria.
- Ke Hyung No, 8th dan (WTF), was invited to Australia by the Victoria Judo Federation in 1965, and taught taekwondo alongside judo. If tang soo do were not recognised as taekwondo retrospectively, No might lay claim to the title. He travelled back to South Korea for further training, returned to Australia in 1971, and established his own martial arts centre at that time. As with Rozinsky, No did not introduce taekwondo outside Victoria.
- Terence Walsh, 8th dan (World Kido Federation), claims to have introduced taekwondo to New South Wales in 1969. If he was the first to introduce taekwondo to Australia's most populous state, then he might lay claim to the title. Walsh did not introduce taekwondo outside the eastern states.
- Young Ku Yun, 8th dan (ITF), has been described as having introduced taekwondo to Sydney in 1971. If he was the first to introduce taekwondo to Australia's largest city, then he might lay claim to the title. Yun arrived around five years after Rhee, however, and himself claimed to be the first ITF instructor (rather than the first taekwondo instructor) in Australia.
- Wee Hin (Steven) Cheah, 9th Dan. Sent by the ITF to Australia in the 1960s, opened his first school in Melbourne. In 1969 was promoted to Queensland Chief Instructor and opened a school in Townsville, Cheah is also considered to be one of the fathers of Australian Taekwon-Do. Having trained under General Choi and C.K Choi in Malaysia. Grand Master Cheah holds the rank of 9th Dan and runs his own federation. Cheah Advanced Taekwondo Australia.

Cheah, Kim and No would have been in the lower dan ranks, and would not yet have held the title of 'Master,' when they were invited to teach in Australia. A biography of No indicates that he had four years' training when he arrived. Rozinsky and Walsh would have held 1st dan ranking in the 1960s. Both Rhee (KTA) and Yun (ITF) would have been in the middle dan ranks and held the title of 'Master' when they arrived, as they were sent to Australia by their respective Korean governing bodies.

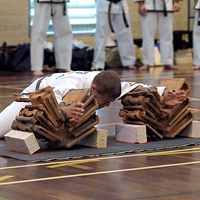
A twin knife-hand strike into two stacks of roof tiles as part of a Rhee Taekwon-Do 2nd dan grading test

=== First taekwondo school in Australia ===
Rhee Taekwon-Do was the first Australian martial art school founded by a Korean master and using the name of taekwondo. Rhee's school was also the first nationwide taekwondo school in Australia, having operated in South Australia from its founding in the mid-1960s, Western Australia from at least 1970, Victoria from at least 1970, the Australian Capital Territory from 1971, Queensland from at least 1973, New South Wales from 1973, and Tasmania from at least 1983. The first Rhee Taekwon-Do class was held in the Adelaide YMCA centre.

Rhee Taekwon-Do's position as the first taekwondo school in Australia might be challenged by the Melbourne Taekwondo Centre (originally the Shuto Karate Club), as tang soo do was one of the arts taught there. Such status would, however, involve recognising tang soo do as taekwondo retrospectively.^{[i]} The Melbourne Taekwondo Centre incorporated taekwondo into its name in the 1970s.

=== Biggest taekwondo school in Australia ===
Rhee Taekwon-Do's position as the biggest taekwondo school in Australia is supported by independently verifiable listings of dojang. It has at least 294 publicly listed dojang in Australia, with perhaps around 1,400 dojang in total at its peak. The claim might be disputed if the Australian member schools of the ITF and the WTF were considered as 'schools' as a whole, whether in terms of numbers of dojang or numbers of members. Rhee Taekwon-Do is, however, a single school under the direct leadership of Rhee while both the ITF and WTF are groups of schools (each with its own head) under a larger governing body.

== Ex-Rhee members ==
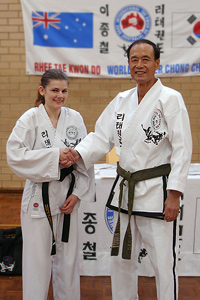
C. C. Rhee promoting a member to the rank of Rhee Taekwon-Do 1st dan

At least 25 founders of Australian martial art schools (and at least one in New Zealand) received their foundational taekwondo training in Rhee Taekwon-Do or are former Rhee Taekwon-Do instructors. Of these ex-members, the highest-ranked was a Rhee Taekwon-Do 6th dan instructor when he left Rhee's school.

=== International Taekwon-Do Federation ===
Ex-members who founded ITF schools include some of the most senior ITF instructors in Australia. Peter Barbour, 9th Dan, was a 2nd Dan instructor in Victoria, under C.H. Rhee in the '80's. Ming Tuck Low, 8th dan, was promoted to Rhee Taekwon-Do 1st dan in 1971, and was a Rhee Taekwon-Do instructor at the University of Western Australia in 1972. Peter Wong, 7th dan, trained in Rhee Taekwon-Do in Western Australia in the early 1970s. Jamie Moore, 8th dan, commenced Rhee Taekwon-Do training in Queensland in 1976. Several other ex-members have founded ITF schools across Australia.^{[j]}

=== Other taekwondo styles ===
Ex-members who founded non-ITF taekwondo schools include some of the more expansionist instructors in Australia. John Ivanov, 9th dan, was a Rhee Taekwon-Do regional instructor in Queensland in 1995. Robert Frost, 7th dan, was a Rhee Taekwon-Do regional instructor in New South Wales in 2003. Lesley Hicks, 6th dan, commenced Rhee Taekwon-Do training in the late 1970s, and was a Rhee Taekwon-Do 3rd dan regional instructor in New South Wales in 2003. Vernon Low, 7th dan, was the Rhee Taekwon-Do State Master Instructor of South Australia, was the first Rhee Taekwon-Do instructor promoted to 5th dan, and had been ranked at 4th dan as early as 1974, prior to establishing his own school.^{[k]} Neville Creevey 6th dan, was a former Student of C.C Rhee in the 1970s, would later become a regional Instructor for Russell Fallon’s K.A.T.O. Several other ex-members have founded non-ITF taekwondo schools.^{[l]}

=== Other martial arts ===
Ex-members who founded schools teaching martial arts other than taekwondo include three instructors with an eclectic martial arts history. Hans Fricke, 8th dan, first met Rhee in Perth in 1970 (with Fricke bearing an introductory letter from the ITF, as he had trained briefly in South Korea), was a Rhee Taekwon-Do 2nd dan instructor in Sydney during the 1970s, and now teaches battodo. Christopher Nasiłowski, 10th dan, trained in Rhee Taekwon-Do in Adelaide from 1972 to 1984, was a Rhee Taekwon-Do 2nd dan instructor, and taught arnis and jujitsu. Graham Healy, 8th dan, trained in Rhee Taekwon-Do in Queensland from 1977 to 1982, was a Rhee Taekwon-Do 1st dan instructor, and now teaches boxing and taekwondo. Several other ex-members have founded other martial art schools.^{[m]}

== Training ==
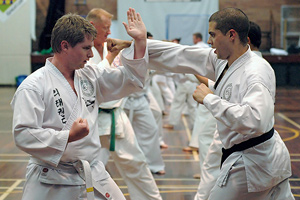
A Rhee Taekwon-Do self-defence drill to practise deflecting an incoming punch aimed at the face

Rhee Taekwon-Do teaches the military style of taekwondo, closer to traditional martial art than modern martial sport in nature. Training consists of exercises that may be classified as: basics (group drill exercises; similar to kihon in karate), destruction (breaking), hyung (patterns or forms), self-defence, and sparring. Basics, destruction, hyung, and self-defence are similar to equivalent exercises in other traditional martial art schools. Rhee Taekwon-Do teaches the ITF Ch'ang Hon forms hyung.

Sparring takes three forms: three-step sparring, one-step sparring, and free sparring. Three-step sparring and one-step sparring are similar to equivalent exercises in ITF and WTF schools, but free sparring is different, having more in common with traditional karate sparring. Rhee Taekwon-Do free sparring is unscored, unarmoured, and usually 'non-contact' in principle. Members typically achieve non-contact sparring by two methods, whether separately or in combination:

- The attacker consciously stops just short of hitting the training partner, while still executing attacks with full speed and power. The attacker has primary responsibility for non-contact, at a given moment during sparring, and this typically occurs when one training partner has more experience than the other. This is normally the practice when one training partner is a beginner.
- The defender actively avoids or blocks an incoming attack executed by the training partner. The defender has primary responsibility for non-contact, at a given moment during sparring, and this typically occurs with training partners of similar experience. This is normally the practice when both training partners are in the senior ranks.

== Ranks ==
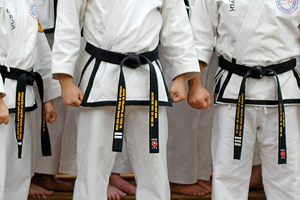
Rhee Taekwon-Do 1st, 2nd, and 3rd dan black belts

Rhee Taekwon-Do ranks are denoted by coloured belts, which indicate a member's level of experience and responsibility within the school. There are ten coloured belt grades, or kup ranks (급), and nine black belt degrees, or dan ranks (단). Members start with white belts and progress through yellow, green, blue, brown, and then black. Most Rhee Tae Kwon-Do students have the opportunity to grade at least four times a year.

Non-black belts, from white through to brown, denote the kup ranks. 'Tips' denoting odd-numbered kup ranks are marked by a stripe of the higher colour near the right end (from the wearer's point of view) of a belt of the lower colour. Black belts denote the dan ranks. A specific dan rank is represented by the number of white or gold bars embroidered on the black belt. A black belt with no bars is a Junior Black Belt, a rank assigned to members considered too young (typically 15 years or younger) for 1st dan. Junior Black Belt members are tested for 1st dan when they reach 18 years of age. One bar denotes 1st dan, two bars denote 2nd dan, and so on. The end of the belt bearing the dan rank also carries embroidery noting the name of the master issuing the promotion (Chong Chul Rhee, Chong Hyup Rhee, or Chong Yoon Rhee).

From mid 2018 onwards, at least 8 regional instructors have been promoted to the rank of 7th Dan, with the title of "Master Instructor". This was previously unheard of, in Rhee Tae Kwondo, as the organisation has historically been very slow to promote senior Dan ranks. It was common for a 5th Dan ranking to take 45 years. Clearly, many senior black belts left the organisation because of this.

== See also ==
- Taekkyeon

== Notes ==
a. "Rhee Taekwon-Do" is the spelling used in the earliest versions of the school's logo. All four spellings appear in official documentation and on uniforms. "Rhee Tae Kwon-Do" appears to be the most common spelling used in membership booklets issued by the school. The figures directly beneath the logo are Jong Soo Park on the left and Chong Hyup Rhee on the right.

b. Rhee Taekwon-Do has also operated in other parts of Oceania in the past, such as Papua New Guinea. In 2008, the school appears to operate exclusively in Australia and New Zealand.

c. Photographs of Rhee Taekwon-Do banners and uniforms from the 1970s and the school's use of the Chang Hon hyung establish its link with the International Taekwon-Do Federation for part of its history.

d. The University of Melbourne's Tae Kwon Do Club might be considered an exception, as it offers both Rhee Taekwon-Do and WTF taekwondo (in separate classes).

e. The KTA (1959/1961) predated both the ITF (1966) and the WTF (1973). The modern KTA is closely aligned to the WTF.

f. Nigel Higgs, Judy Tynan, and Jerry Hatter are some of the Rhee Taekwon-Do instructors also recognised as Masters, holding the title of Regional Master Instructor. John O'Brien had previously been a Regional Master Instructor in Rhee Taekwon-Do, prior to leaving with V. Low.

g. While discussing the introduction of taekwondo to Malaysia and Singapore, Ki Ha Rhee noted that Choi had instructed him to bring another instructor with him. Almost certainly referring to C. H. Rhee, he added, "That's why I took the brother of Rhee Chong Chul—from Rhee International—he was the first to graduate so he came to Malaysia then I brought him to Singapore" (p. 52).

h. According to Museum Victoria, there were only 72 Koreans in Victoria in 1971.

i. The Korean striking art taught by Kim, Rozinsky, and No in the 1960s was described as tang soo do or Korean karate, and not as taekwondo. It is a matter of interpretation whether the art should be called taekwondo retrospectively. The Shuto Karate Club (founded by Rozinsky in 1963) later became the Melbourne Taekwondo Centre, and tang soo do was one of the arts taught there. In contrast to the Australian sources, US author B. Maclaughlin (1972) reported: "In addition to his time-consuming work in judo, Kim found the opportunity to further the interest of Korean karate and established the first Australian tae kwon do school in Melbourne. The new club was heartily endorsed by Kim's karate sensei, General Hong-Hi Choi, head of the Korean Tae Kwon Do Association" (p. 27). See Korea Taekwondo Association and Tang Soo Do for more information.

j. Ex-members who founded ITF schools also include: Misko (Michael) Kordanovski, 8th dan; Graham Moulden, 8th dan; Spiridon Cariotis, 7th dan; Steve Weston, 6th dan; Scott Bower, 6th dan; George Gabrielides, 5th dan; Catherine McMaster; Steven Luxmoore, 5th dan; Trevor Harbrow, 2nd dan; Shane Astwood, 3rd dan; and Robert Clarkson, 4th dan, Kordanovski was a Rhee Taekwon-Do 4th dan instructor under C. H. Rhee in Melbourne and was promoted to ITF 7th dan (ITF Master Instructor status) in 2007. His nephew Dragi Kuzmanovski trained in Rhee Taekwon-Do from 1975 to 1995 and was also a Rhee Taekwon-Do instructor. Moulden commenced Rhee Taekwon-Do training in Queensland in 1976, was promoted to Rhee Taekwon-Do 1st dan in 1979, was a Rhee Taekwon-Do 3rd dan regional instructor in 1993, and was promoted to ITF 7th dan in 2012. Cariotis trained in Rhee Taekwon-Do around the early 1980s. Weston commenced Rhee Taekwon-Do training in Tasmania in 1983, was promoted to Rhee Taekwon-Do 1st dan in 1986, and was a Rhee Taekwon-Do instructor in 1993. Bower commenced training in Rhee in 1984, was promoted to Rhee Taekwon-Do 1st dan in 1988 and was a Rhee Taekwon-Do instructor in Townsville until 1999. Gabrielides was a Rhee Taekwon-Do instructor in Sydney from the 1980s until 1999. McMaster commenced training in Rhee Taekwon-Do in Adelaide, was promoted to Rhee Taekwon-Do 1st dan, was a Rhee Taekwon-Do instructor in Adelaide, and now teaches in her own school in Canberra. Luxmoore trained in Rhee Taekwon-Do in Queensland from 1986 to 1991, and was promoted to Rhee Taekwon-Do 1st dan. Harbrow was a Rhee Taekwon-Do 2nd dan instructor in New Zealand in 2003. Astwood commenced Rhee Taekwon-Do training in Queensland in 1992, and was a Rhee Taekwon-Do 1st dan instructor in 2003. Clarkson was a Rhee Taekwon-Do 1st dan member.

k. Along with C. Y. Rhee, V. Low is a former Technical Advisor to Australasian Fighting Arts magazine, while C. C. Rhee and C. H. Rhee are former Special Consultants to that publication.

l. Ex-members who founded non-ITF taekwondo schools also include: Dr. Hassan Iskandar OAM, 9th dan (Kukkiwon); Graham Johnson, 7th dan; Trevor Dicks, 7th dan; Wahid Halimee, 7th dan, and Carol Halimee, 6th dan; Bradley Tatnell, 8th dan; Nasim Chami, 6th dan; Glen Corbett, 5th dan, and Paul Corbett, 5th dan; and Paul Mitchell, 5th dan. GM Hassan Iskandar PhD trained at Rhee Taekwon-Do in Sydney in the 1970s, GM Hassan Iskandar OAM is inducted in the official Taekwondo Hall Of Fame 2011. and now leads the popular and in demand Pinnacle Taekwondo Martial Arts academy in Sydney.Johnson was a Rhee Taekwon-Do instructor in Queensland in the 1970s. Dicks was a Rhee Taekwon-Do 2nd dan regional instructor in Queensland in 1993. W. Halimee commenced Rhee Taekwon-Do training in 1976 and was a Rhee Taekwon-Do senior instructor in South Australia around 1990, while C. Halimee commenced Rhee Taekwon-Do training in 1972 or 1974, according to two different autobiographical accounts, and was a Rhee Taekwon-Do instructor in South Australia in 1993. Tatnell commenced Rhee Taekwon-Do training in Queensland in the 1980s, was a Rhee Taekwon-Do instructor in 1993, and now teaches taekwondo and hapkido. Chami commenced Rhee Taekwon-Do training in New South Wales in 1979, and was promoted to Rhee Taekwon-Do 1st dan in 1986. G. Corbett and P. Corbett commenced Rhee Taekwon-Do training in New South Wales in 1979 and 1980, respectively. Mitchell was a Rhee Taekwon-Do 3rd dan regional instructor in Sydney in the early 2000s.

m. Ex-members who founded schools teaching martial arts other than taekwondo also include: Sai Thow Lam; Rod Power; Glenn Puckeridge, 4th dan; Kay Thoren; Glen Gardiner, 7th dan; and Kacey Chong. Lam commenced Rhee Taekwon-Do training in Western Australia in the early 1970s, and now teaches his own martial art based on kung fu. Power commenced Rhee Taekwon-Do training in Western Australia in 1973, was a Rhee Taekwon-Do instructor in the mid-1970s, and now teaches Chinese martial arts. Puckeridge commenced Rhee Taekwon-Do training in New South Wales in the 1970s under C. Y. Rhee, and now teaches several martial arts, with a focus on wing chun kung fu. Thoren commenced Rhee Taekwon-Do training in the early 1980s, was promoted to 1st dan in 1984 and became a Rhee Taekwon-Do instructor the following year, and now teaches tai chi. Gardiner commenced Rhee Taekwon-Do training in Queensland in 1983, and now teaches karate, battodo, and eskrima. Chong commenced Rhee Taekwon-Do training in Victoria in the 1990s under C. H. Rhee, and now teaches kickboxing.

n. Ivanov, Dicks, Frost, and Hicks all rose from Rhee Taekwon-Do 2nd/3rd dan to 5th/6th dan, promoted by the WTF or other taekwondo organisations, within a year or two of leaving Rhee's school. Moulden and Harbrow were exceptions to this trend.
