= Frank Massar =

British taekwondo practitioner

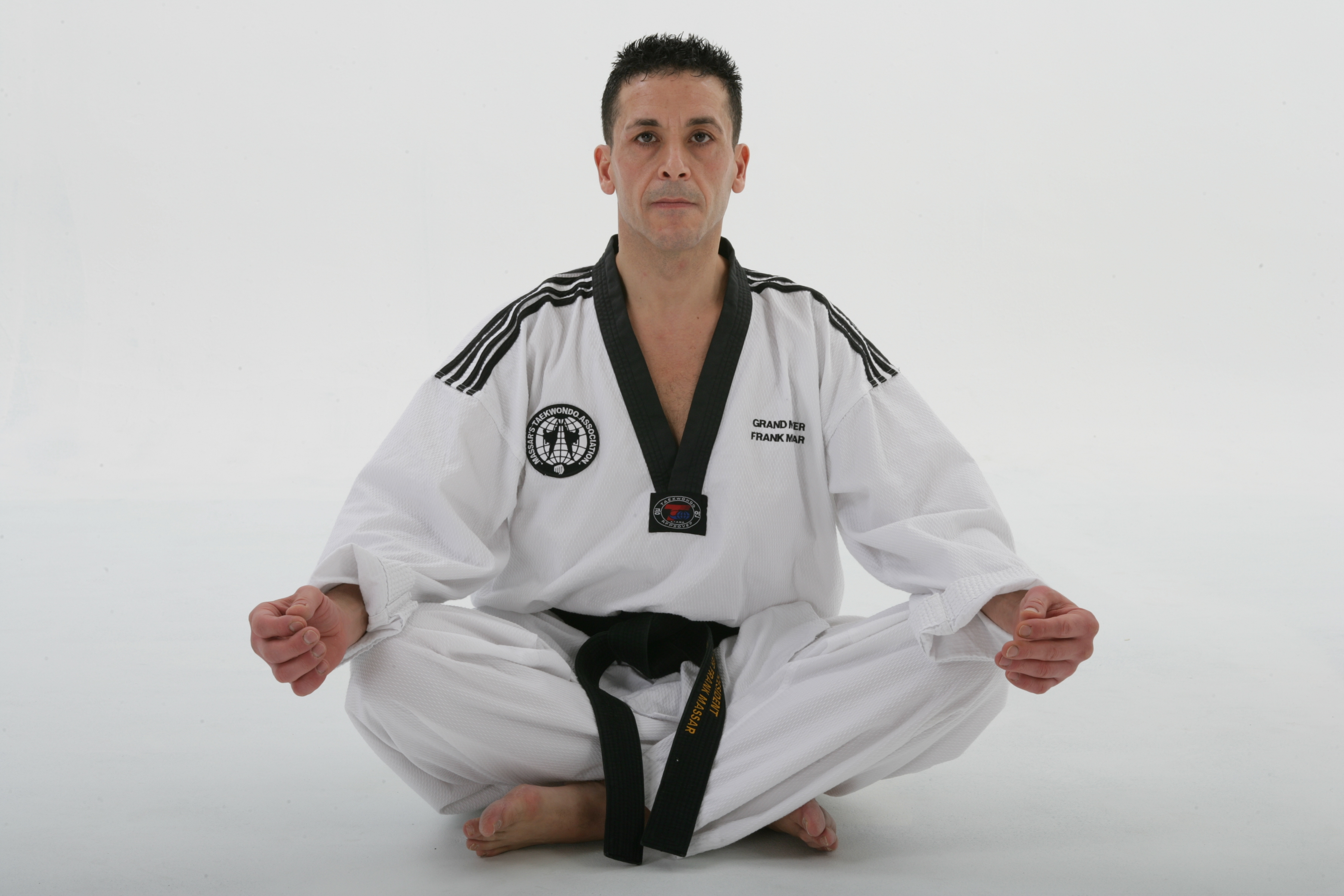
- Frank Massar
- Born: April 2, 1958 (age 68); London
- Nationality: British
- Style: Taekwondo, Muay Thai, Hapkido, Chinese Kung Fu
- Rank: 9th dan Taekwondo

Other information
- Occupation: Martial Artist; Master Instructor
- Website: http://www.massartaekwondo.com/

Frank Massar is a British martial artist. He currently holds the rank of 9th Dan in Taekwondo and is the founder of Massar Taekwondo Association. He has achieved six “Combat Hall of Fame Awards”, and holds several national and international competition titles. He is also featured in many magazines and books. He studied under Won Kuk Lee and also under Pak Hae Man of Chung Do Kwan. Massar received his Dan qualification directly from Kukkiwon (WTF) and graduated from Chung Do Kwan. Massar's precept is to share his knowledge of martial arts with the community at large, 'Passing on the Gift' and keeps in constant contact with various educational associations to achieve this end.

== Early life ==
Massar grew up in North London and began learning martial arts from an early age. Massar was first introduced to Japanese Karate through his brothers. Before the age of 10, Massar had begun to study Judo. Shortly thereafter he was introduced to taekwondo, by Steve Lee. Under Lee's tutelage, Massar's skills developed very quickly and he was soon noted for his fitness, flexibility and superlative Taekwondo kicking style. Massar's eagerness to learn eventually compelled him to become a student of C.K Kok, who was instrumental in expanding his knowledge of Chinese Kung Fu especially the skills of breaking, weaponry, conditioning, medicine and healing, aspects of which can be evident in his freestyle classes. Massar supports the view that individuals should learn more than one martial art in order to become a more complete martial artist.

== Asia ==
Park Hae Man, then and current Vice-president of World Taekwondo Chung Do Kwan, trained Massar from the late seventies. Ultimately, Frank became a Grand Master in his own right. Park continues to train Massar to this day. Park and Uhm Woon Kyu were both students of Won Kuk Lee. Uhm was ex President of Kukkiwon and currently President of Chung Do Kwan.

Massar travelled extensively throughout Asia and the Far East from 1979 to 1984. He became friends with Kong Fu Tak while training in the YMCA in the mid seventies. They decided to travel all over Asia and the Far East and it was during these travels that they became involved in Muay Thai and Massar was instrumental in helping Kong Fu Tak take Thai Boxing to Hong Kong.

== United States ==
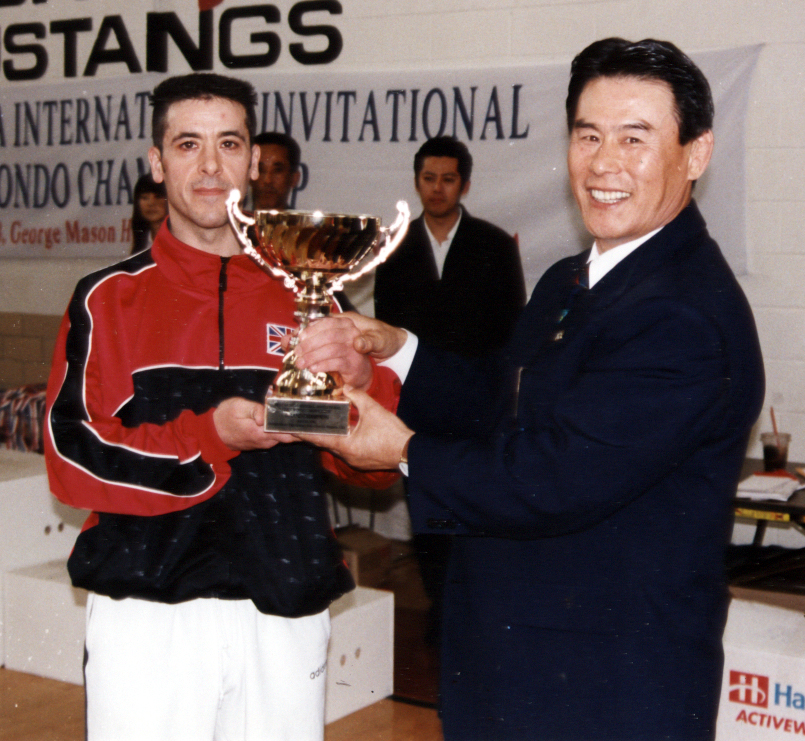
Frank Massar presented with the trophy by Dr Park - "US Open International Grand Champion"

Massar first met the late Cha Sok Park (President of the Pan American Taekwondo Union) in the 80s. Their friendship developed over the years and under Park's tutelage, he learnt the martial art of Hapkido, which he has successfully incorporated into his freestyle classes. Park invited Massar to join his Union. Park then introduced Massar to another, even greater Taekwondo figurehead, the late Won Kuk Lee, attributed with developing Taekwondo as a martial art. He was awarded the 9th Dan degree black belt by Lee. in Washington USA. On Great Grandmaster's passing, he held Massar in such regard that he bequeath him some of his personal effects.

== Europe ==
Although Massar travelled to Asia and America frequently, he maintains his presence in Europe. He was keen to partake in competitions personally, for which he received much accolade, and he encourages his students to be similarly active. Massar is an advocate of quality learning in the class and, is against achieving increasing numbers of students in his classroom for the sake of it. Grading is timed for when a student is fully prepared rather than on a periodic basis. Black belt gradings are reserved for those most deserving. Massar retains his hardcore taekwondo gyms, along with his freestyle martial art centres. Many of his martial art gyms are located within Greater London.

== Media coverage ==
Articles on Massar appeared 25 times in "Tae Kwon Do & Korean Martial Arts" magazine—including 7 times when he was on the cover. He was also profiled in the July 1994 issue of "Fighters Martial Arts", as well as being covered in the September 1995 issue of "Martial Arts Illustrated" and the April, 1999 issue of "Combat".

== See also ==
- Kukkiwon
- Chung Do Kwan
- List of taekwondo grandmasters
