= Chong-chul Rhee =

South Korean taekwondo practitioner

Rhee Chong-chul
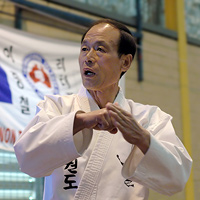
- C. C. Rhee, c. 2021
- Born: Chong Chul Rhee (이종철); South Korea
- Died: 27 October, 2023. Natural causes Sydney, Australia
- Other names: World Master Chong Chul Rhee
- Nationality: Korean
- Style: Taekwondo
- Rank: 8th Dan Taekwondo

Other information
- Occupation: Martial Arts Instructor
- Notable relatives: Chong-Hyup Rhee (Younger brother), Chong-Yoon Rhee (Younger Brother)
- Notable school: Rhee Taekwon-Do

Rhee Chong-chul (Korean: 이종철; Hanja: 李鐘鐵; b. (redacted due to inaccuracy) d. 27 October 2023) was a South Korean Master of Taekwondo who arrived to Australia in the 1960s. He is the founder of Rhee Taekwon-Do, which is widely publicised as Australia's first and biggest Taekwondo school. Rhee holds the title 'World Master' and the rank of 8th Dan in Taekwondo. He is one of the twelve Original Masters of Taekwondo of the Korea Taekwon-Do Association (KTA).^{[a]}

== Early life ==
Rhee was born in Korea during the period of Japanese occupation from 1910–1945. As a youth, he trained in martial arts, basketball, boxing, gymnastics, and weights. Later, he was an instructor in the Korean Marines for three years, teaching unarmed combat to the Marine Commandoes, Marine Brigade Headquarters, and the Marine 2nd Infantry Division. Under the direction of the KTA, Chong Chul & Chong Hyup Rhee helped introduce the art of taekwondo to Southeast Asia—most notably in Malaysia and Singapore, but also in Hong Kong, Indonesia, and Brunei.

== Australia ==
Rhee was the first Taekwondo master sent to Australia by the Republic of Korea, and was ranked around 5th Dan at the time.^{[b]} He founded Rhee Taekwon-Do in Adelaide, South Australia, around 1965. Two of his brothers later joined him, and assisted in managing parts of the school.^{[c]} Rhee was promoted to 8th Dan in the early 1980s.^{[b]} He personally conducted Rhee Taekwon-Do grading examinations across most of Australia, visiting every region 4 times each year.

Rhee worked towards the reunification of Korea, serving as a member during the third through ninth terms—and as Chairman for the eighth term—of the Oceania Division of the Advisory Council on Democratic and Peaceful Unification. He also served as Chairman of the Seoul Olympics Supporting Committee and founding President of the Korean Community Hall Construction Supporting Committee. The Republic of Korea awarded Rhee the Dongbaeg Medal (동백장) in 2003 for promoting taekwondo and Korean culture over the previous 33 years.

Rhee is listed as a pioneer in Asia (1950s and 1960s) and Australia (1970s) in Choi Chang-keun's list of taekwondo pioneers.

== See also ==
- Korean reunification
- List of taekwondo grandmasters
- Master Rhee (disambiguation)

== Notes ==
a. The Korea Taekwon-Do Association (KTA; 1959/1961) predated both the International Taekwon-Do Federation (ITF; 1966) and the World Taekwondo Federation (WTF; 1973). The modern KTA is closely aligned to the WTF.

b. Rhee's rank at various times is indicated in photographs released by Rhee Taekwon-Do. These photographs appear in Rhee Taekwon-Do membership booklets and in Rhee Taekwondo magazine, which was published internally from January 1980 to the 1990s. Rhee also appears in photographs released by former Rhee Taekwon-Do members, such as Hans Fricke and Graham Healy.

c. Chong-hyup Rhee, 7th dan, and Chong-yoon Rhee, 9th dan, are both masters in Rhee Taekwon-Do. The former is based in Melbourne, Victoria, and the latter is based in Sydney, New South Wales.
