= Chung Yong-taek =

South Korean taekwondo practitioner

- Born: 3 March 1921; Seoul, Korea
- Died: 11 November 2006 (aged 85); Fountain Valley, California
- Style: Tang Soo Do, Tae Kwon Do
- Teacher(s): Won Kuk Lee
- Rank: 9th dan Tae Kwon Do

Chung Yong-taek (Korean: 정용택, March 3, 1921 – November 11, 2006) was a martial artist, 9th degree black belt in taekwondo, belonging to the first Chung Do Kwan school Black Belt promotion and pupil of Lee Won-kuk. He was also the first Korean instructor in open a Chung Do Kwan school outside Korea, in Japan on 1952, and vice president of the World Taekwondo Association.

== Early days ==
Chung was born in Seoul, Korea on March 3, 1921. While his family had been highly respected and part of the educated class they lost everything during the Japanese occupation and, like most during that time, struggled for survival. Chung became interested in martial arts as a boy but it was illegal at that time to openly teach or learn martial art in Korea. Not until he was a young man, at the age of 25, did Chung begin to train in the art of Tang Soo Do under the instruction of Lee Won-kuk. Sometime later, after martial art training became legal, Chung circulated among the later Chung Do Kwan students and he was to become almost a mythic figure because of his exploits.

== Japan ==
After Lee Won-kuk retired and moved to Japan Chung soon followed his teacher, settling in Tokyo and opening the first Chung Do Kwan Branch Club outside of Korea. In 1955 the Chung Do Kwan (like all Korean martial arts schools) officially adopted the name "Tae Kwon Do" for their martial art curriculum and so Chung found himself as a major figure in the Tokyo martial arts community serving as president of the All Japan Tae Kwon Do Association. In 1959, while still in Tokyo, Master Chung won the prestigious Tournament of Masters.

== Travel to the USA ==
In 1974 Chung decided to bring his expertise to Kansas City, Missouri in the United States and aligned with the World Tae Kwon Do Association under Son Duk-son in which he served as a vice president. During Master Chung's time in Tokyo as well as in Kansas City he would regularly receive visits from his old instructor, Great Grand Master Lee Won-kuk. It was during one of these visits in 1984 that Master Chung received the rank of 9th Dan Black awarded by his master Lee.

== Legacy ==
Chung Yong-taek preferred the title Sabu Nim meaning "Teacher." This unassuming title understates his depth of skill and experience. A 9th Degree Black Belt, Chung devoted his entire life to the mastery and teaching of Tae Kwon Do. He was known for his toughness and bravery. Chung was to remain one of Lee's top students and kept a close relationship with his instructor for the rest of his life. In 1988 Chung retired from teaching, turning his schools over to his students, and moved to Garden Grove, California but remained active with his students and in retirement Chung spent the next 19 years helping students, instructors and Masters continue the Chung Do Kwan tradition.

Master Chung died at his home in Fountain Valley, California on November 11, 2006.
