= Original masters of taekwondo =

Group of twelve South Korean martial art masters

The Republic of Korea sent the original masters of taekwondo to introduce this Korean martial art across the world

The original masters of taekwondo is a group of twelve South Korean martial art masters assembled by the Korea Taekwondo Association (KTA) in the early 1960s to promote the newly established art of taekwondo. In alphabetical order following Korean naming conventions, they are: Choi Chang-Keun, Choi Kwang-Jo, Han Cha-Kyo, Kim Jong-Chan, Kim Kwan-Il, Kong Young-Il, Park Jong-Soo, Park Jung-Tae, Park Sun-Jae, Rhee Chong-Chul, Rhee Chong-Hyup, and Rhee Ki-Ha.

The group came under the leadership of Choi Hong-hi (1918–2002), inaugural president of the KTA and later founder of the International Taekwon-Do Federation (ITF), and Nam Tae-hi (1929–2013), known as the Father of Vietnamese Taekwondo. Many of these men held senior positions in the ITF under Choi, but several left over time. Most of the men settled in North America, while others settled in Europe or Australia.

The phrase "original masters of taekwondo" is used to describe this group of men, but does not indicate that they were the first (or original) masters in the KTA. The leaders of the nine kwans that unified to form the KTA was a different group of men who, while perhaps senior to some of those listed as "original masters of taekwondo", were practising arts with other names, such as tae soo do, kong soo do, and others. Some of those leaders resisted using the name taekwondo. The men in the present group were among the first to adopt and promote the name taekwondo.

== History ==
=== Demonstrations and tours ===
The original masters of taekwondo featured in the earliest demonstrations of taekwondo as a Korean martial art outside South Korea. The following table summarises demonstrations or instructional tours for which references are available.

KTA: 1959–1965
Date	Place(s)	Masters involved	References
March 1959	Far East: Taiwan · Vietnam	C. K. Han	
February 1964	Singapore	K. H. Rhee	
1964	Penang, Malaysia	C. K. Choi	
1964	Yugoslavia	S. J. Park	
c. 1964	Brunei · Hong Kong · Indonesia · Malaysia · Singapore	C. C. Rhee	
c. 1964–1965	Malaysia · Singapore	C. H. Rhee	
c. 1965	Adelaide, Australia	C. C. Rhee	
c. October 1965	United Arab Republic (now Egypt) · Italy · Malaysia · Singapore · Turkey · West Germany	C. K. Han, J. S. Park, Jae-Hwa Kwon	
1965–1967	Vietnam	J. T. Park	
Early ITF: 1966–1980
Date	Place(s)	Masters involved	References
1966	Netherlands	J. S. Park	
c. 1966–1967	Hong Kong · Indonesia · Malaysia · Singapore	K. J. Choi	
1967	Japan	C. K. Han	
1967	United Kingdom	K. H. Rhee	
1968	Hong Kong	C. K. Han	
1968	Canada	J. S. Park	
c. 1968–1969	Paris, France	K. I. Kim, S. J. Park, K. H. Rhee	
March 1970	Toronto, Canada	J. T. Park	
1970	Perth, Australia	C. C. Rhee	
1970	Vancouver, Canada	C. K. Choi	
1970	United States of America	K. J. Choi	
1971	Singapore	C. K. Han	
1971	United States of America	C. K. Han	
1972	Apollo Stadium, Adelaide, Australia	C. C. Rhee, C. H. Rhee	
November–December 1973	Africa · Europe · Far East · Middle East	C. K. Choi, Y. I. Kong, J. S. Park, S. J. Park, K. H. Rhee	
July 1974	Sydney, Australia	C. H. Rhee	
1974	Maple Leaf Gardens, Toronto, Canada	Y. I. Kong, J. S. Park, K. H. Rhee	
9 March 1975	Kelvin Halls, Glasgow, United Kingdom	C. K. Choi, K. I. Kim, Y. I. Kong, J. S. Park, J. T. Park, S. J. Park, K. H. Rhee	
c. early 1978	Kenya · Malaysia · Pakistan · South Africa	K. H. Rhee	
May 1978	Hungary · Poland · Sweden · Yugoslavia	C. K. Choi, J. T. Park, K. H. Rhee	
1979	Denmark · France · Greenland · Sweden · West Germany	K. H. Rhee	
November 1979	Argentina	C. K. Choi, J. C. Kim, J. T. Park, K. H. Rhee	
Late ITF: 1981–2002
Date	Place(s)	Masters involved	References
January 1981	Queensland, Australia	C. K. Choi	
1981	North Korea	J. T. Park	
October–November 1982	Austria · Czechoslovakia · Denmark · Finland · Greenland · Hungary · Poland · United Kingdom · West Germany · Yugoslavia	J. T. Park	
November 1984	New York, United States of America	J. T. Park	
November 1985	Norway	J. T. Park	
1987	Buenos Aires, Argentina	J. T. Park	
1990	USSR	K. H. Rhee	
Post-H. H. Choi: 2003–
Date	Place(s)	Masters involved	References
25–27 April 2003	Solvalla Sports Institute, Espoo, Finland	K. H. Rhee	
2–4 May 2008	Vancouver, Canada	J. C. Kim, J. S. Park	
27–28 September 2008	Beijing, China	J. S. Park	
2–3 December 2009	Curtin University of Technology, Perth, Australia	K. H. Rhee	

=== Relationship with H. H. Choi ===
Many of the original masters of taekwondo went on to prominent roles in the ITF in the late 1960s and 1970s. As time passed and many of these masters left the ITF, their photographs were removed from Choi's series of taekwondo textbooks and replaced with photographs of current ITF masters. One of the main reasons for their departure was Choi's insistence on initiating relationships with North Korea, during a period in which that country and South Korea were "technically at war" (Gillis, 2003, p. 104; C. K. Choi, 2010, p. 147), or at best, had "no diplomatic relations" (C. K. Choi, 2010, p. 147) or "no diplomatic ties" (World Taekwon-Do Alliance). At least one of the masters reported that it was with regret that he stopped supporting Choi. North and South Korea are still considered to be technically at war.

Seven of the masters settled in North America: Chang-keun Choi (Canada, 1970), Kwang-jo Choi (USA, 1970), Cha-kyo Han (USA, 1971), Jong-chan Kim (Canada), Young-il Kong (USA, c. 1968), Jong-soo Park (Canada, 1968), and Jung-tae Park (Canada, 1970). The leaders of the group also settled in North America: H. H. Choi moved to Canada and T. H. Nam settled in the USA. Three of the masters settled in Europe: Kwang-il Kim (West Germany, now Germany, c. 1970), Sun-jae Park (Italy, c. 1970), and Ki-ha Rhee (United Kingdom, 1967). Two of the masters settled in Australia: Chong-chul Rhee (c. 1965), and Chong Hyup Rhee (c. 1970).

C. K. Choi, J. C. Kim, Y. I. Kong, J. S. Park, and K. H. Rhee have maintained the strongest links with the ITF. H. H. Choi had personally promoted C. K. Choi to 8th dan (1981), Y. I Kong to 9th dan (1997), and K. H. Rhee to 9th dan (1997).

== Biographies ==
The following table summarises the status of the twelve original masters of taekwondo.

Name	Rank	Life	Residence	Organisation	Affiliation
Choi Chang-keun (최창근)	9th dan	c. 1940–	Vancouver, Canada	Tae Kwon Do Pioneers	ITF
Choi Kwang-jo (최광조)	9th dan	1942–	(United States) Atlanta, USA	Choi Kwang-Do	Independent
Han Cha-kyo (한차겨)	9th dan	1934–1996	(United States) Chicago, USA	Universal Tae Kwon Do Federation	Independent
Kim Jong-chan (김종찬)	9th dan	1936–	Vancouver, Canada	Jong Kim Martial Arts - Surrey - Taekwondo	ITF
Kim Kwang-il (김광일)	9th dan	1939–2001	Germany	Kwang Mu Sul Taekwon-Do	Independent
Kong Young-il (공영일)	9th dan	1943–	(United States) Las Vegas, USA	Young Brothers Tae Kwon-Do Institute	Independent
Park Jong-soo (박정수)	9th dan	1941–2021	Toronto, Canada	Jong Soo Park Institute of Taekwon-Do	ITF
Park Jung-tae (박정태)	9th dan	c. 1943–2002	Mississauga, Canada	Global Taekwon-Do Federation	Independent
Park Sun-jae (박승재)	7th dan or higher	1938–2016	Italy	Federazione Italiana Taekwondo (Italian Taekwondo Federation)	WT (formerly WTF)
Rhee Chong-chul (리종철)	8th dan	c. 1935–2023	Sydney, Australia	Rhee Taekwon-Do	Independent
	6th dan	c. 1	Melbourne, Australia		
Rhee Ki-ha (리기하)	9th dan	1938–	(United Kingdom) Glasgow, UK	United Kingdom Taekwon-Do Association	ITF

=== Choi Chang-keun ===
Choi Chang-keun was born around 1940 in Korea. He began his martial arts training in the South Korean army in 1956, studying taekwondo and karate. Choi taught taekwondo in Malaysia from 1964, and moved to Vancouver, Canada, in 1970. In 1973, he held the rank of 7th dan. Choi was promoted to 8th dan in 1981 by H. H. Choi, and attained the rank of 9th dan in 2002. He is still based in Vancouver.

=== Choi Kwang-jo ===
K. J. Choi was born on 2 March 1942, in Daegu, Korea. His martial art training began when he was still a child, learning kwon bup. Choi served in the South Korean military and came into contact with H. H. Choi there. Around 1966–1967, he taught taekwondo in Hong Kong, Indonesia, Malaysia, and Singapore. Choi moved to the United States of America in 1970 to seek medical treatment for injuries sustained from martial arts training. In 1987, he founded his own martial art system and organisation, Choi Kwang Do. He is based in Atlanta. Choi holds the rank of 9th dan in his own martial art, Choi Kwang Do.

=== Han Cha-kyo ===
C. K. Han was born on 20 July 1934 in Seoul, Korea. He trained under three martial art masters: Tae-hi Nam, Duk-sung Son, and Woon-kyu Um. Han was the first of the original masters of taekwondo to demonstrate overseas, participating in the March 1959 tour of Taiwan and Vietnam. Following a career in the South Korean military, he emigrated to the United States of America in 1971, settling in Chicago. Han founded his own organisation, the Universal Tae Kwon Do Federation, around 1980. He continued teaching taekwondo until his death in 1996.

=== Kim Jong-chan ===
J. C. Kim was born in 1936. 1953 Began studying martial arts with Kim Bong-gil 1955 General Choi announced and created the name TAEKWON-DO on 11 April. 1956 Joined the Military Police Academy, studied various Martial Arts under Kim Sung-bok 1957 Under the direction of General Ha built the first TAEKWON-DO academy of the 7th Infantry Division with Major Park. Introduced to General Choi. 1958 Attended the First Instructors course held under the First Army in Won Ju, Korea, led by Major Woo (2nd Dan Black Belt), Lieutenant Hong (1st Dan Black Belt) and Captain Nam (3rd Dan Black Belt)Appointed to the Special Security Mission for the Army Commander. Trained in all Martial Arts for 8 months. 1960 Promoted to 2nd Dan Black Belt in Tae Kwon-Do 1962 Appointed as Head Instructor of the Oh Do Kwan Headquarters school in Seoul. Organized the world's first TAEKWON-DO Championships, held in Wonju, Korea, where CK Choi became free sparring and patterns champion 1963 Promoted to Tae Soo Do (Karate) 3rd Degree Black Belt 1964 Trained directly under General Choi for four months, where the 24 Tae-Kwon Do patterns were formed. Assisted General Choi with the First TAEKWON-DO Book. Introduced Park Jong-soo to General Choi. Appointed as the first Instructor to Instructors for the minister of defense (Army, Navy, Air Force & Marine Corps.) 1965 Organized TAEKWON-DO as primary martial art trained in the Korean military. 1966 The International TAEKWON-DO Federation (ITF) was formed. Appointed as Chief Instructor and a founding member of the ITF. -Taught Tae-Kwon Do Patterns, Chon-Ji to Choong-Moo to instructor Jhoon Ree. Thereafter Jhoon Rhee went to USA and published the TAEKWON-DO Handbook. Taught Tae-Kwon Do Patterns Chon-Ji to Choong-Moo to instructor Kim Han-chan. Thereafter Kim Han-chan went to Argentina. Appointed as the first Tae Kwon Do Chief Instructor to the Korean National Police Force, by the Minister of Homeland Affairs 1967 Developed the first International Instructors course for the ITF, where the minimum student entrant would possess a 4th Dan black belt. 1968 Invited by the Singapore government to introduce TAEKWON-DO. Instructed in Malaysia Perak State. 1969 Organized the first Malaysian TAEKWON-DO Championships in Penang 1970 Arrived in Vancouver BC Canada to promote and demonstrate TAEKWON-DO with C.K. Choi at UBC, SFU, & various high schools. 1971 Organized with Han Cha-kyo, the first Asian TAEKWON-DO Championships, held in Hong Kong. Taught Army Cadets in New Westminster BC Arrived in Montreal Canada

1972 Opened the first TAEKWON-DO School in Montreal. 1973 Appointed as the first chairman of the technical committee of the International TAEKWON-DO Federation. Promoted to 7 Dan black belt. Organized the World's First TAEKWON-DO Masters Demonstration, at the Montreal Forum where 27 Masters attended. 1974 Organized the World's First TAEKWON-DO Championships held at the Montreal Forum. 24 countries participated. 1975 Invented the stretching machine “the Stretchersizer” 1976 Invited as the Instructor, of the European Instructors course held in Glasgow U K. 1977 Studied Bio Physical Education at Concordia University 1978 Moved to New Westminster BC 1979 Trained 21 TAEKWON-DO instructors in Argentina including Dr Hector Marano and Pablo Trajtenberg, and with an unprecedented move, promoted several of them directly from 2nd Dan to 4th Dan Black Belts. 1981 Promoted to 8th Dan Black Belt. Elected as the secretary general of the ITF. Appointed as the chairman of the merging committee for the ITF and WT. As chairman of the merging committee, negotiated the merging agreement between the ITF and the WT, that was submitted to the International Olympic Committee by Un-yong Kim, in order to have Tae Kwon- Do accepted as an Olympic sport. 1982 Quietly resigned from the ITF and all Tae Kwon do duties, due to opposition to General Choi’s controversial political statements made in North Korea 1991 Promoted to 9th Dan Black Belt 2015 JC KIM`S two sons Rich Kim and Edward Kim are following in his footsteps, are currently and have been for over 30 years, teaching Tae Kwon-Do in Surrey, BC at Jong Kim Martial Arts - Surrey - Taekwondo. In 1979, ranked 7th dan, he taught and demonstrated in Argentina along with C. K. Choi, J. T. Park, and K. H. Rhee. A letter by Kim published in the July 1985 issue of Black Belt magazine lists his title at the time as president of the 'World Tukido Council.' He is based in Vancouver, Canada.

=== Kim Kwang-il ===
K. I. Kim contributed to the introduction of taekwondo into West Germany. He was head instructor of the ITF in West Germany, but was relieved of this duty in October 1971. In 1975, Kim was ranked 6th dan. He promoted Rolf Becking, head of the ITF Germany Technical Committee, to the rank of 2nd dan in 1976 in Stuttgart, West Germany. Between 1974 and 1977 Kim had a restaurant in Stuttgart and had completed training as a Brewmeister prior to 1974.

=== Kong Young-il ===
Y. I. Kong was born in 1943 in Korea. He began training in the martial arts as a child in 1952, starting with Shotokan karate. From 1963 to 1967, Kong served in the South Korean army, attaining the rank of Sergeant. He participated in several demonstration tours across the world. Following a career in the South Korean military, Kong emigrated to the United States of America just before or in 1968. He and his younger brother, Young-bo Kong, founded the Young Brothers Taekwondo Associates in 1968. Kong was promoted to the rank of 9th dan in 1997 by H. H. Choi in Poland. He is based in Las Vegas.

=== Park Jong-soo ===
J. S. Park was born in 1941 in Chung-Nam, Korea. He trained in taekwondo under H. H. Choi. In 1965, he was invited to be the coach of the German Taekwon-Do Association, and moved from South Korea to West Germany. The following year, he moved to the Netherlands and founded the Netherlands Taekwon-Do Association. In 1968, Park settled in Toronto, Canada. Park holds the rank of 9th dan. Grandmaster Park Jong-soo died November 26, 2021.

=== Park Jung-tae ===
J. T. Park was born in 1943 or 1944 in Korea. He began training in the martial arts as a child, starting with boxing before moving on to judo and then taekwondo. From 1965 to 1967, Park directed military taekwondo training in Vietnam. He emigrated to Canada where he met his future wife, Linda, in Toronto in 1970. In 1984, Park was ranked 8th dan in the ITF. He founded his own organisation, the Global Taekwon-Do Federation (GTF), on 14 June 1990—the year after his departure from the ITF due to North–South Korean political issues. Park was based in Mississauga until his death in 2002.

=== Park Sun-jae ===
S. J. Park is a pioneer of taekwondo in Italy. In 1964, he visited Croatia to present seminars on his art. He introduced taekwondo to Italy around 1968. In 1968, he was ranked 5th dan, and in 1975, he was ranked 7th dan. He was elected vice-president (Italy) in the European Tae Kwon Do Union (within the World Taekwondo Federation) at the union's inaugural meeting in 1976. In 2002, he was a member of the arbitration board for the WT's World Cup Taekwondo championship in Tokyo. On 15 February 2004, the executive council of the WT elected him as acting president of the WT following Un-yong Kim's resignation from the presidency of the organisation. He is vice president (Italy) of the WT. Park was president of the Federazione Italiana Taekwondo (Italian Taekwondo Federation) around 1998, and still held the position as of 2008 and 2009.

=== Rhee Chong-chul ===
C. C. Rhee was born around 1935 in Korea. As a youth, he trained in martial arts, basketball, boxing, gymnastics, and weights. Later, he was an instructor in the Korean Marines for three years, teaching unarmed combat to the Marine Commandoes, Marine Brigade Headquarters, and the Marine 2nd Infantry Division. Rhee helped introduce the art of taekwondo to Southeast Asia—most notably in Malaysia and Singapore, but also in Hong Kong, Indonesia, and Brunei. He founded his own organisation, Rhee Taekwon-Do, in Adelaide, Australia, around 1965. Rhee came to be known as the Father of Australian Taekwondo. He is based in Sydney.

=== Rhee Chong-hyup ===
C. H. Rhee was born around 1940 in Korea. In the mid-1960s, he contributed to the introduction of taekwondo to Malaysia and Singapore. He arrived in Australia in 1970 and settled in Melbourne, Australia. Rhee is in charge of Rhee Taekwon-Do operations in Melbourne.

=== Rhee Ki-ha ===
K. H. Rhee was born on 20 March 1938 in Seoul, Korea. His martial arts training began when he was around 7 or 8 years of age, learning judo from his father. He later learned karate from one of his schoolteachers. When Rhee served in the South Korean military forces, he came into contact with H. H. Choi and learned taekwondo in the 35th Infantry Division. From February 1964, he taught taekwondo to Royal Air Force personnel in Singapore. He emigrated to London on 2 July 1967. He attained the rank of 8th dan in 1981, and was promoted to 9th dan by H. H. Choi on 1 July 1997 in Saint Petersburg, Russia. Rhee came to be known as the Father of British Taekwondo, as well as the Father of Irish Taekwondo. He is now based in Glasgow.

== See also ==
- List of taekwondo grandmasters
