= Choi Kwang-jo =

South Korean taekwondoin (born 1940)

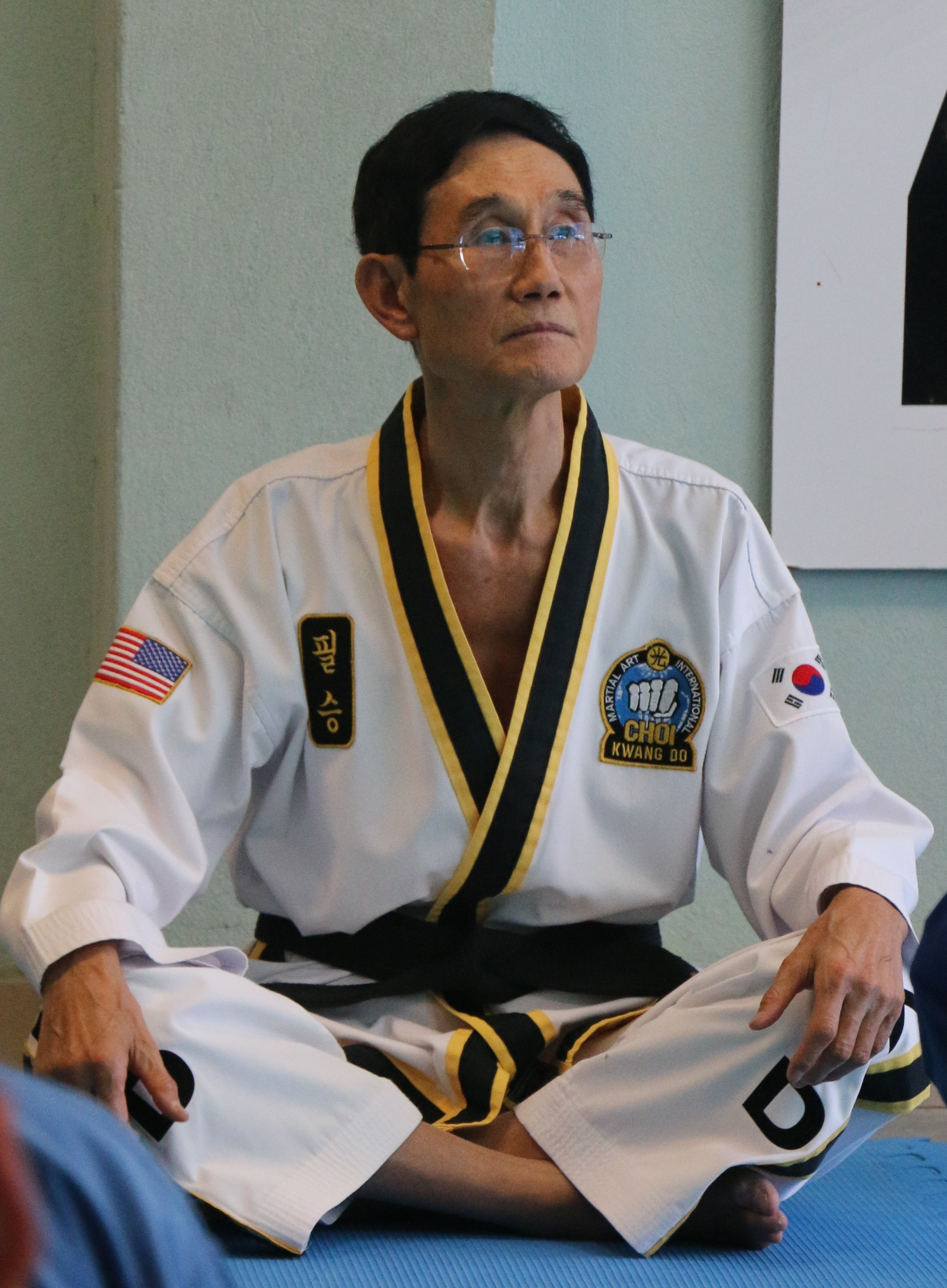
- Grand Master Choi Kwang-jo in 2014
- Born: March 2, 1942 (age 84); Daegu-bu, Keishōhoku-dō, Korea, Empire of Japan
- Style: Choi Kwang Do, Taekwondo
- Teacher: Lee Dong-ju
- Rank: 9th dan (CKD)

Other information
- Website: http://www.choikwangdo.com/

Korean name
- Hangul: 최광조
- Hanja: 崔光照
- RR: Choe Gwangjo
- MR: Ch'oe Kwangjo

Choi Kwang-jo (born March 2, 1942) is a former South Korean national champion in taekwondo, and is one of the twelve original masters of taekwondo of the Korea Taekwon-Do Association. Following a career in the South Korean military, he emigrated to the United States of America in 1970. Choi is the founder and head of the Choi Kwang Do international martial art organization, with headquarters in Atlanta, Georgia, USA.

== Early life ==
Choi was born on March 2, 1942, in Daegu. He started training in martial arts at age 12 because his father wanted his small and physically weak son to be able to protect himself on the war-torn streets. Choi's first master was Dong Ju Lee. During his military service, Choi became chief instructor for the 20th Infantry Division and met General H. H. Choi when the military began to use taekwondo for unarmed combat.

== United States ==
Due to injuries sustained from his martial arts training he sought medical attention in the United States of America, moving in 1970, and began to study different physical therapy techniques. As a result, he began to study anatomy, physiology, and human-movement sciences.

In 1987, Choi incorporated everything he had learned into his own martial art system called Choi Kwang Do, which translates as “the art (or method) of Kwang Choi.” Choi maintains that Choi Kwang Do is free from the mysticisms of traditional martial arts, yet he advertises that his art practises yoga-based stretching. Choi heads the Choi Kwang Do organization from Atlanta and was inducted into the Tae Kwon Do Times magazine's Hall of Fame in 2006. One notable critic of Choi is Roger Koo. Since resigning from the post of Vice President under Choi's organization in 1991, Koo has remained a staunch opponent. Koo dedicates a large portion of his website to disparaging Choi and his organization.

Choi is listed as a pioneer in Asia (1950s and 1960s) and Canada (1970s) in Chang Keun Choi's list of taekwondo pioneers.

== See also ==
- International Taekwon-Do Federation
- List of taekwondo grandmasters
