= Han Cha-kyo =

South Korean taekwondo practitioner

- Born: 20 July 1934; Seoul, Korea
- Died: 1996 (aged 61–62); Chicago, Illinois, USA
- Style: Taekwondo
- Teachers: Won Kuk Lee, Nam Tae Hi, Duk Sung Son, Woon Kyu Um
- Rank: 9th dan taekwondo (UTF), 8th dan taekwondo (ITF)

Other information
- Website: http://utf.whsites.net/

Han Cha-kyo (20 July 1934 – 1996) was a South Korean master of taekwondo, and one of the twelve original masters of taekwondo of the Korea Taekwon-Do Association. He held the rank of 9th dan in taekwondo. Following a career in the South Korean military, he emigrated to the United States of America in 1971 with his wife and newborn daughter Nancy Han. He later had another daughter, Catherine Han. After teaching taekwondo for many years in Chicago, he died in 1996.

== Early life ==
Han was born on 20 July 1934 in Seoul, Korea, during the period of Japanese occupation. He trained under three martial art masters: Nam Tae Hi, Duk Sung Son, and Woon Kyu Um. From 1950 to 1959, Han served as a martial art instructor in the Korean military forces. Through the 1960s, his career continued with both military assignments and leadership of demonstration teams overseas. In 1965, Han was ranked 6th dan.

== United States ==
In 1971, Han emigrated to the United States of America and settled in Chicago. Together with his brother Han Min Kyo, himself a 9th dan, he developed the Han method and obtained patents for his exercises. He founded the Universal Tae Kwon Do Federation around 1980.^{[a]} He had a wife and two daughters who were both trained in Tae Kwon Do by their father. Han died in 1996.

Han appears on Chang Keun Choi's list of taekwondo pioneers.

== See also ==
- International Taekwon-Do Federation
- List of taekwondo grandmasters

== Notes ==
a. Han's Universal Tae Kwon Do Federation is not the same as the Universal Taekwondo Federation based in the United Kingdom.
