= Son Duk-sung =

South Korean taekwondo practitioner

- Born: 17 June 1922; Seoul, Korea
- Died: 29 March 2011 (aged 88); Newport, Rhode Island
- Style: Tang Soo Do Chung Do Kwan, Taekwondo
- Teacher: Lee Won-kuk
- Rank: 9th dan Tae Kwon Do

Son Duk-sung (Korean: 손덕성; Hanja: 孫德成; June 17, 1922 – March 29, 2011) was a martial artist, Grand Master and ninth-degree black belt, co-founder of the Korean martial art of taekwondo, successor of Lee Won-kuk and leader of the Chung Do Kwan school (1950–59). He was also the chief Instructor of the South Korean Army and the 8th U.S. Army, founder and president of the World Taekwondo Association and author of the books "Korean Karate, the Art of Tae Kwon Do” and “Black Belt Korean Karate."

== Early life ==
Son Duk-sung was born in Seoul on June 17, 1922, when South Korea was under Japanese colonial rule. He started boxing at age 16, and after gruesome training, he rose quickly to becoming a national champion in his category. Back then, it was common for him to return home each night, with his face all bruised and cut up that kept him from eating. So his parents forbid him from practicing boxing. In 1942, he decided to start Tang Soo Do or Chung Do Kwan style training (School of the Blue Wave) under Lee Won-kuk, who was just returning from Japan, as Son would later remember.

"It was a different world. At the boxing gym, people would steal your shoes or towel, and the place was always dirty. But at the Chung Do Kwan school, everyone was kind; there was an atmosphere of camaraderie and friendship; we all worked out together. The style was no contact, so no one was beaten or hurt."

After arduous years of training, he obtained his first-degree black belt; becoming part of the first-generation class of Chung Do Kwan among Uhm Woon-kyu, Chung Yong-taek, Kang Suh-chong, Myun Hyun-jong and others.

At the end of World War II in 1945, Korea saw military, political and social conflicts that forced Lee Won-kuk to move to Japan in 1951. These conflicts made Lee officially retire from teaching, leaving Son as his successor. During the Korean War, Son took over the leadership of Chung Do Kwan, gathered school members, and kept teaching and promoting the style through tournaments, exhibitions and press articles.

Son sent his advanced students to teach at the most prestigious institutions of South Korea. Uhm was assigned to teach at the Korean Military Academy, SungKyunKwan University and Seoul National University. Nam Tae-hi taught the South Korean Army, and Son taught the Seoul police and the 8th U.S. Army.

Korean President Syngman Rhee named Son chief instructor of the Republic of Korea Army, where he met Choi Hong-hi, major general of the 29th Infantry Division. The two formed a strong friendship. In 1955, due to his closeness with President Rhee and thinking that he could use Choi's military authority to spread Chung Do Kwan, Son gave an honorary fourth-degree blackbelt in front of Choi's 3rd Army for his contribution to the martial arts.

== Birth of taekwondo ==
On December 19, 1955, while searching for a name that would reflect Korean culture, a meeting of Chung Do Kwan advisors discussed a new unifying name for the martial art, which was known by several names such as tang soo do, gong soo do, taekkyon and gwon beop; these terminologies were occasionally associated with Chinese or Japanese culture.

During this meeting, representatives of the South Korean government, media, politicians and the military met with Son Duk-sung, chief of Chung Do Kwan who came with Choi Hong-hi and Nam Tae-hi, who represented the military branch of the school.

The meeting decided on the official name "taekwondo" for the Korean martial art to supersede all other names.

== Internal conflict ==
Through the efforts of Son Duk-sung, Chung Do Kwan grew into the country's largest school at both the civil and military levels. The original members, however, looked for a more active participation that would see them open independently new schools under their own names in the country.

Choi Hong-hi, a high-ranking officer of the South Korean army, was ordered to start a military school in 1954. He recruited a group of 50 military staff, some of whom were high-ranking students from Chung Do Kwan like professional soldiers (Hyun Jong-myun, Nam Tae-hi, Han Cha-kyo, Woo Jong-rim, Ko Jae-chun, Kim Suk-kyu, and Kwak Kuen-suk. This school became known as Oh Do Kwan and sent instructors to Vietnam to train South Korean troops without permission from Sun. Kang Suh-chong created Kuk Mu Kwan, and other instructors lessened their recognition of Son as a school official. The influence and leadership of Choi started to grow.

On June 16, 1959, Son, worried about keeping the philosophical principles of Chung Do Kwan, published a letter in the South Korean newspaper Seoul Shinmun dismissing a group of advanced students including Choi, Nam and Uhm. This caused total separation and exclusion of Son from all sport organizations in Korea.

Acting rapidly, Choi Hong-hi gathered all other members of the top schools and took over the leadership of Chung Do Kwan:

"In late fall 1959, I invited all leaders of the four top gwans to my home. No Byung-jik represented Song Moo Gwan; Yoon, Kwe-byung represented Ji Do Kwan; Lee, Nam-suk represented Chang Moo Kwan; and Hwang Ki represented Moo Duk Kwan; while I represented Oh Do Gwan and Chung Do Kwan.”

As result from this meeting, the Korean Tae Kwon Do Association was born on September 3, 1959 with Choi named its first president. He named Uhm Woon-kyu in the same year as new chief of Chung Do Kwan. Choi was elected president due to his position as a general in the Republic of Korea Army when the country was under a military regime and for the promise he made to other school chiefs to promote taekwondo.

== Trip to the U.S. ==
In April 1963, Son left for the U.S., where he started to teach Tae Kwon Do, or "Korean karate as it was called then. His first classes were outdoors at Central Park in Manhattan and the basement of a downtown synagogue in New York City. In late 1963, he held regular classes Monday through Friday from 6 p.m. to 8 p.m. at his first gym at 162 7th corner of 21st Street in New York.

Son started teaching classes at West Point, the universities of Princeton, New York, Brown and Fordham, State University of New York Stony Brook, and the YMCA of New Jersey, among others. He also established the Tae Han Karate Association, which became the World TaeKwon-Do Association in 1966.

The organization grew fast and in 1965, a group of Korean instructors, some of them ex-students of Son in Korea, established themselves in the U.S. Their first black belts started to promote the martial art in the U.S. In 1969, Luke Grande arrived in Venezuela and founded the first taekwondo Chung Do Kwan school in that country and in 1987, Rod Preble did the same in Australia.

The first 11 black belts promoted by Son in North America were:

1. Martin Rosenberg
2. Thomas(Tom) Carrillo
3. Robert J. Clark
4. Joe La Marca
5. Ron Kelly
6. James Yergan
7. Neil Gingold
8. Luke Grande
9. Jeff Potter
10. Donald Zammit
11. Joe Lamar

As Luke Grande said:

"In the first years of his arrival to the USA, the training was very intense. We ran in Central Park and then kick a tree at least 100 times with each leg; in rain or snow, with the intense heat of the summer, the training never stopped. Then we would train at the gym at 6 p.m. We would do this routine six times a week."

== World Tae Kwon Do Association ==
The current World Tae Kwon Do Association entity is an independent organization not governed by the Kukkiwon, and it doesn't follow the guidelines of the World Taekwondo Federation or the International Taekwon-Do Federation. It developed itself under the original philosophical and human principles, following its traditional roots. Its current president is Yehjong Son.

In 1966 Son Duk-sung endorsed a proposal made by Jae Bock Chung to establish the World Tae Kwon Do Association (WTA), substituting the Tae Han Karate Association created by Son in 1962. Son became president, and at the peak of its existence, the World Tae Kwon Do Association amassed more than 495 schools in the United States, Venezuela and Australia, and it became the largest Tae Kwon Do organization in the United States.

Other masters who assumed important WTA roles were:

- Chung Yong-taek – Vice-president
- J.B. Chung – Director
- K.H. Kim – Technical Director
- Young-Sik Choi – Midwest Director
- D.H. Kim – West Coast Director
- S.P. Chang – East Coast Director
- H.S. Ko – Southern Director
- N.Y. Chung – Tournament Organizer
- K.W. Yu – Examiner
- C.K. Han – Advisor
- Dr. Robert Sexton - Attending Physician
- T.D. Kim, T.Y. Kim, Y.K. Chang, and N.Y. Cho – Other members of the Board of Directors

In 1999, due to differences between the board of directors and the leadership of the WTA regarding who will be the next president, the board of directors decided to leave the association, so they organized a new association, the National Tae Kwon Do Association (NTA). Since the early 1990s, the WTA organization fragmented and the majority of its former members are spread out in more than 26 independent Tae Kwon Do organizations in the United States and Venezuela.

American Masters in the World Tae Kwon Do Association:

Son awarded to six of his American instructors with the degree of "master" in the martial art. The six American masters are:

- Rico Dos Anjos
- Jerry Orenstein
- Ralph Rubino
- Jack Emmel
- Ron Geoffrion
- Jim Cahill

== Later graduates ==
- Michael T. Dealy, Ph.D. (Founder of the World Martial Arts Association, Brooklyn, NY)
- Jake Pontillo (Founder of Buffalo University Tae Kwon Do Club, 1970)
- Luke Grande.1970 founder of Tae Kwon Do in Venezuela.
- Ricardo Dos Anjos (Westchester, NY- World Tae Kwon Do Association)
- Jerry Orenstein (Tae Kwon Do Chung Do Kwan Schools)
- Ron Geoffrion (co-founder of the USA Tae Kwon Do Masters Association)
- Ralph Rubino (co-founder of the USA Tae Kwon Do Masters Association)
- Jack Emmel (co-founder of the USA Tae Kwon Do Masters Association)
- Jim Cahill (co-founder of the USA Tae Kwon Do Masters Association)
- Pete Michaelson (Tae Kwon Do Chung Do Kwan Schools)
- Ray Mondschein (Founder of Rochester,NY -North American Tae Kwon Do Chung Do Kwan
- Humberto Almeida 1976 WTA US Certificate 921 (Co-founder Director of Organización Venezolana Chung Do Kwan)
- Charles LaVanchy (co-founder of Traditional Tae Kwon Do Chung Do Kwan Association w/ GM Choi, Yong-sik
- Brandon Baker (Former Technical Director of Traditional Tae Kwon do Chung Do Kwan Association W/ GM Choi, Young-Sik)
- Víctor Alfonso (Founder of Chung Do Kwan Alfonso's)
- Bob Heckmann (Founder of Five Points Karate, World Tae Kwon Do Association)
- Keith A. Lipsey (American Taekwondo Society-Tiger Fist Division, World Tae Kwon Do Association)
- Álvaro Rodríguez 1980 US 1535, Caracas Venezuela
- Adolfo Vivas 1980 WTA US Certificate 1534, Caracas Venezuela, Co-founder Director of ORVECDK, Venezuelan Chung Do Kwan Organization
- Joshua S. Garvin, Red Oak Iowa. US Certificate issued on March 28, 1993 (youngest officially documented full time World Tae Kwon Do Association instructor for both children and adults at age 14, with teaching duties for 3 different WTA satellite schools located in Red Oak, Shenandoah, and Clarinda, Iowa respectively. Official instructorship granted and documented by Master K.H. Kim in Omaha in 1993. GrandMaster Son, in a symbolic display, personally wore and autographed Josh's uniform at the following 1993 Omaha tournament in September during the evening demonstration and finals in front of the entirety of the gathered WTA members as his own acknowledgement and open approval of the investiture. Josh is also an 18 time national tournament 1st place sparring champion. Teaching duties shared equally with Linda Morris at the Red Oak and Shenandoah schools, and Ken Sunderman at the Clarinda school.)

== Death ==
Son Duk-sung, died on 29 March 2011 at Newport Hospital, Newport, RI, United States Of America. He is survived by his daughter Yehjong Son and her husband, Steven G. Cundy and his granddaughter Lahna Son-Cundy.
