= Kiha =

Kiha, KiHa, or KIHA may refer to:

- Kiha-a-Piilani
- Kihanuilulumoku, an 11th Alii Aimoku of Hawaii ruling from 1435 to 1465
- Ki-ha, a Korean given name (including a list of people with the name)
- Kiha Software, a Paul Allen funded software startup in Seattle
- KiHa, the technical assignment for diesel multiple unit rolling stock by Japan Railways
- Korea Ice Hockey Association (KIHA), a governing body of ice hockey in South Korea
