= Robert Howard (martial artist) =

Irish master of taekwondo

Robert J. Howard
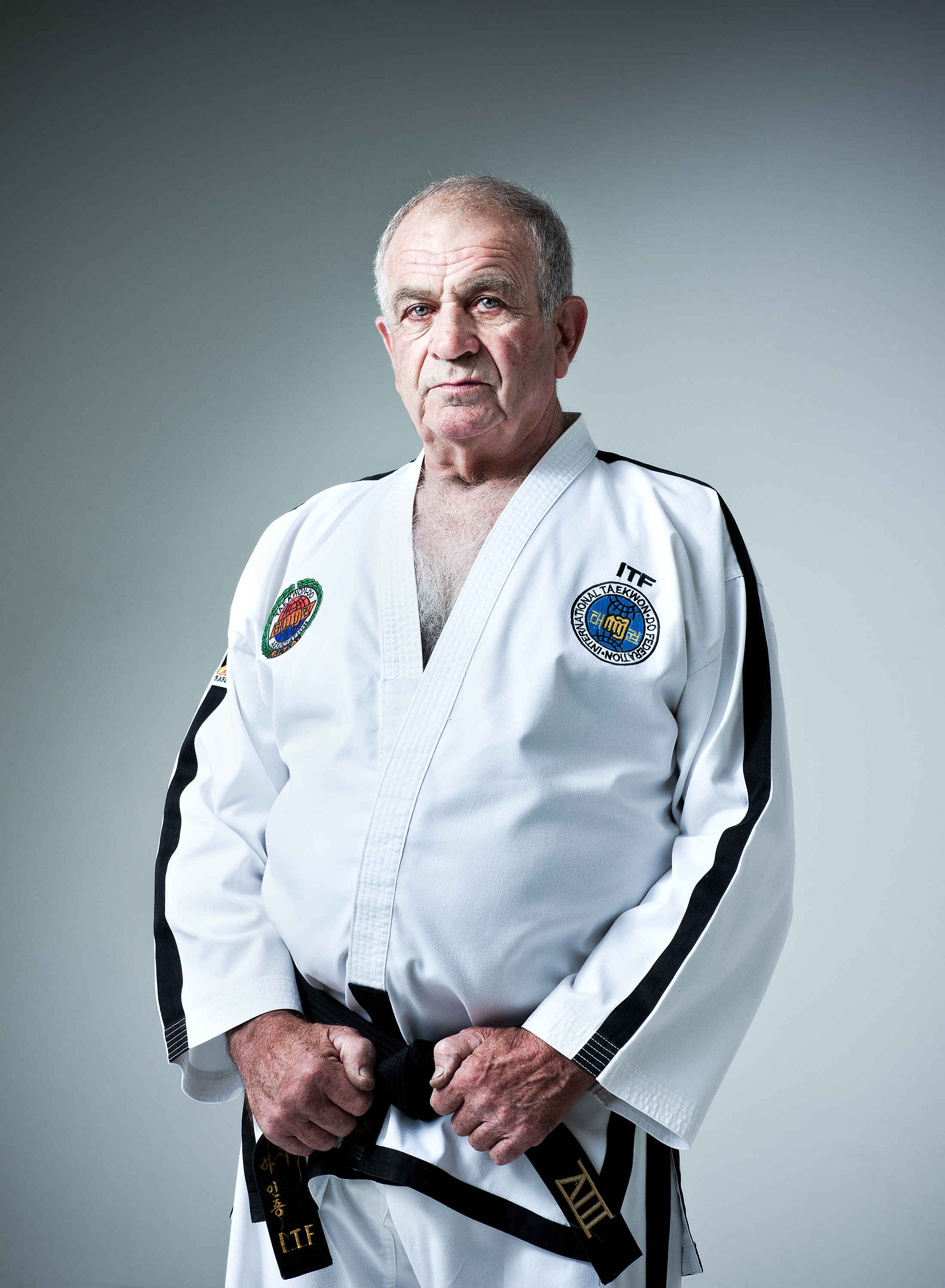
- R. J. Howard, September 2011
- Born: 29 November 1938 (age 87); Dublin, Ireland
- Style: Taekwondo
- Teacher: Rhee Ki Ha
- Rank: 9th dan taekwondo (ITF)

Robert J. Howard (born 29 November 1938) is an Irish Grandmaster of taekwondo. He is ranked 9th dan black belt and is the first European to have been promoted to Grandmaster by the International Taekwon-Do Federation.

Howard is now retired, but was a roofer by trade and is well known for apt demonstrations of smashing roof tiles. He has appeared on Ireland's most popular television show, RTE's The Late Late Show, on two occasions, most recently following his promotion, where he undertook a demonstration of tile breaking, and originally in 1976 where he famously broke his hand live on the show when he was undertaking a demonstration of block smashing.

== Early life ==
Howard was born in Mountjoy Square, Dublin, Ireland and he was raised in the Whitehall area of Dublin, before moving to the Santry, Dublin, where he resides now.

== Establishing Taekwondo in the Republic of Ireland ==
Howard was at the forefront of establishing taekwondo in the Republic of Ireland. Since the early 1970s, he has represented Ireland in taekwondo all over the world and has had a distinguished martial arts career with many international achievements, initially as a competitor where he won two silver medals in the World Championships in Oklahoma, USA, later as an Umpire in competitions, and more recently as VIP at the Taekwon-Do World Championships in Pyongyang, North Korea.

When Howard first became involved in martial arts, in the early 1960s, taekwondo was unheard of in Ireland. He therefore started his training in karate in 1966 in Gardiner Place, Dublin. After several years, a Korean instructor (Yung Wu Kwon, 3rd dan) arrived at the club and began teaching them after he had moved to Ireland to look for work. Kwon was Howard's first introduction to the Korean martial art of taekwondo. Howard and his early classmates (Liam Dandy, Frank Matthews, and Paul Kavanagh) had never seen techniques like these before and were extremely impressed. Later, another Korean instructor (Chang Ho Cho, 5th dan) started to teach and train in the hall. Cho graded Howard, Dandy and Matthews to red belt, but shortly afterwards he had to leave for the USA in search of work.

The class continued to train together and after a while they heard of another Korean black belt who had just arrived in England from Singapore, Rhee Ki Ha (then 5th dan), whom they contacted and arranged to visit him in Coventry where he was living. Rhee agreed to come to Dublin and watch them train, after which he travelled to Dublin on a monthly basis to instruct and train the Irish students for a whole weekend at a time.

In May 1971, Howard, Dandy, and Matthews's techniques and skills were rigorously tested for their black belts in Oxford, England. As a test of power they were required to break two inches of timber with various kicks, punch ten tiles, and finally chop a house brick. Howard, Dandy, and Matthews passed to become the first Irish taekwondo black belts. On their return to Dublin, they set in motion a programme to establish a strong taekwondo presence in Dublin. One year later, in 1972, with the help of Rhee, the Republic of Ireland Taekwon-Do Association (RITA) was established. The members of the RITA then travelled the country performing demonstrations in order to boost develop public awareness of the martial art with result that further taekwondo schools were established throughout Ireland. In June 1973, Howard, Dandy, and Matthews were awarded their second degrees in Dublin, which coincided with the first home international against Turkey. On this first occasion, Ireland were the losers. At the 1974 World Championships, held in Canada, Ireland came third overall, with Dandy taking the title of Best Fighter.

In 1975, Ireland then beat England in an international contest. Three years later, at the 1978 World Championships held in Oklahoma, USA, Howard won two silver medals while Dandy took home a gold.

In 1979, Howard (along with Dandy) received his 4th dan, after which he ceased being an international competitor but continued to travel abroad to tournaments as an international umpire.

In recognition of their efforts to strengthen ITF taekwondo in Ireland, Rhee presented Howard and Phelan with awards for their indomitable spirit. At the same time, Rhee honoured Howard by bestowing upon him the position of president of the RITA.

In 1995, both Howard and Phelan received their 7th dan and became the first Irish men to become Masters in taekwondo. At the time of their awards, there were only two other Europeans to hold such a title. In 1999 and 2000 respectively, Liam Dandy and Francis Barrett were also promoted to Masters 7th dan.

Howard and Phelan were promoted to 8th dan in 2002 and Howard was promoted to 9th dan in 2011.

== Personal life ==
Howard has three daughters, one son (Robert G. Howard, also known as Robert Howard Jr.), and nine grandchildren. In total, taekwondo is practiced by three generations of his family. Howard's son is also well known in Ireland as a taekwondo expert, and is a Master of taekwondo 7th dan. Robert Howard Jr. has been practicing taekwondo since 1979 and trains and assists with teaching in his father's classes in Cabra, Dublin, as well as being an examiner to Athlone and Galway schools. Howard also has a son in-law and daughter in-law who are ranked 2nd dan, and three of his grandchildren also practice taekwondo.
