= Chung Do Kwan =

Taekwondo schools or kwan teaching

Chung Do Kwan (청도관)
- Date founded: c. 1944; 82 years ago
- Country of origin: South Korea
- Founder: Won Kuk Lee
- Arts taught: Tang Soo Do, Taekwondo
- Practitioners: Won Kuk Lee, Jhoon Rhee, Woon Kyu Um, Yong Taek Chung

- Chung Do Kwan
- Hangul: 청도관
- Hanja: 靑濤館
- RR: Cheongdogwan
- MR: Ch'ŏngdogwan

Chung Do Kwan, created by Won Kuk Lee in 1944, is one of the first of nine schools or kwan teaching Tang Soo Do. Later, the school began to teach what came to be known as taekwondo. This style of Tang Soo Do is known for its overall power and emphasis on kicks to the head.

== Founding ==
The Chung Do Kwan (靑濤館; "Blue Wave School") name was first used by Won Kuk Lee. Lee had studied Taekkyon in An Gup Dong (a neighborhood in Seoul), karate with Gichin Funakoshi in Japan, and kung fu at centers in Henan and Shanghai in China. Lee earned 4th dan ranking in Shotokan karate. According to Yong Taek Chung (a student of Lee) "it is probable that he did practice in secret as a teenager because he told this author that when he first started training he and his first teachers would not exchange names due to possible consequences if someone got caught." Chung Do Kwan was the second oldest of the martial arts schools, or "kwans", that were established following the Japanese Occupation of Korea, being established shortly after the Song Moo Kwan.

Lee trained under Gichin Funakoshi Sensei at Chuo University in Japan. Lee also traveled to China and Okinawa, studying martial arts technique, history, and philosophy. According to Won Kuk Lee interview, the main differences among Korean style Tang Soo Do, Karate, and Kung Fu were in how pressure points were used and attacked.

The belt system of the Chung Do Kwan under Lee was as follows: White (8th-5th Guep), Red (4th-1st Guep) and Black (1st to 7th Dan). Testing occurred every six months and students would jump two guep levels per test (8th to 6th guep for example). The reason for this was that many Koreans at that time were poor and could not afford frequent testings.

== Taekwondo ==
The name "Taekwondo" was proposed in 1955 by Choi Hong Hi. It was slow to catch on among other Kwan Heads (Kwan Jang). Two names which were actually the two historical names of Karate, pronounced in the Korean language were being used by the Kwan's. Tang Soo Do (Karate; China Hand Way), which was first used by Chung Do Kwan, was used by the following Kwan's. Tang Soo Do Chung Do Kwan, Tang Soo Do Moo Duk Kwan, Tang Soo Do Song Moo Kwan, Tang Soo Do Oh Do Kwan (ITF root) and Tang Soo Do Jung Do Kwan. The first Kwan to use Kong Soo Do (Karate; Empty Hand Way) was "Chosun Yun Moo Kwan Kwonbop Kong Soo Do Bu" which later became Jidokwan. Kong So Do was used by the following Kwans. Kong Soo Do Jidokwan, Kong Soo Do Chang Moo Kwan, Kong So Do Han Moo Kwan. Kang Duk Won, also a kwan, used the moniker "Moo Do" instead of Tang Soo, or Kong Soo. The Oh Do Kwan and Chung Do Kwan adopted the name "Taekwondo" immediately at Gen. Choi's direction as he was head of both kwans at the time.

On August 5, 1965, the name "Taekwondo" was adopted and became the official name under the Korea Taekwondo Association (KTA).

== Development ==
The Chung Do Kwan was the first Kwan to open in Korea. Because of his law background, Lee was appointed as a teacher at the Korean Police Academy and many of his early students were police.

President of South Korea Syngman Rhee later offered Lee the position of Minister of the Interior. However, when Lee politely refused, President Rhee arrested Lee as well as one of his senior students, Son Duk-sung. After being released, Lee and his family emigrated back to Japan immediately prior to the beginning of the Korean War. Before leaving Korea, Lee appointed his senior student, Yoo Ung-jun to succeed him as the Chung Do Kwan Kwan Jang. Yoo instead became a supporter of North Korea and eventually the position went to Son Duk-sung. Son was succeeded as president of the Chung Do Kwan by Uhm Woon-kyu in 1959. Uhm also served as President of Kukkiwon (World Taekwondo Headquarters).

== First graduates ==
First generation Chung Do Kwan students include:

=== Woon Kyu Uhm ===
Uhm Woon Kyu was the fourth Chung Do Kwan Kwan Jang, after Lee Won-kuk, Yoo Ung-jun and Son Duk-sung. He is also a previous leader of the Chung Do Kwan, as well as the ex-President of the Kukkiwon, succeeding longtime President Kim Un Yong. Uhm's nickname was "Sliding Side Kick God," due to his unmatched ability with that technique. Reportedly, he could kick an opponent from ten feet away using it.

Uhm helped devise the current rules governing modern Taekwondo free sparring, and is one of the pioneers responsible for the formation of modern Taekwondo. He was also Special Instructor for the South Korean Military. He also played a large part in the formation and development of the Korea Taekwondo Association, the World Taekwondo Federation and the Kukkiwon (World Taekwondo Headquarters).

As one of Lee Won Kuk's original and first students, Uhm remains a link to the earliest days of Taekwondo. As Head of Chung Do Kwan and President of the Kukkiwon, he spent decades ensuring that Kukki Taekwondo retains the power, etiquette, high technique, manners, and Way that makes it one of the world's preeminent martial arts. He was one of the most important Taekwondo figures in Korea, and one of the most important in the history of the Chung Do Kwan.

Woon Kyu Uhm died on June 10, 2017.

=== Suh Chong Kang ===
Kang Suh Chong started his martial arts training in 1938 in Yudo, Su Bahk Do, and later became a student of Tang Soo Do/Kong Soo Do under Lee Won Kuk (Chung Do Kwan Founder) and is a graduate of the first class of Chung Do Kwan Black Belts. In 1953 he founded his own branch of Tae Kwon Do and named it Kuk Mu Kwan. From 1957 to 1969 Kang served as the head instructor of the Korean Central Intelligence Agency (KCIA), formerly known as Korean Military Intelligence Agency, and from 1960 to 1968 he was the commanding instructor for the Republic of Korea (ROK) Army.

Kang came to the United States in 1969, already an 8th Dan Black Belt, with his family and founded his own Tae Kwon Do academy in Brooklyn, New York. Physically he was known for his power, breaking techniques, and superior knowledge of the Chang Hon Forms. He became the first President of the American Tae Kwon Do Association (ATA) from 1969 to 1978. However his name is rarely mentioned in the history of the ATA. Even though Haeng Ung Lee (ATA Co-Founder) was a student of Kang. This is due to the political take over of the ATA by H.U. Lee in 1978.

Before his death, Lee Won Kuk promoted Kang Suh Chong to 10th Dan Black Belt. Making him the first of the original Chung Do Kwan Black Belts to receive this honor.

Today at age 89 Kang still teaches and is the Chairman of the All American Tae Kwon Do Federation (AATF) and the World Tae Kwon Do Chung Do Kwan Federation. His Tae Kwon Do system continues to grow through the teachings of his 3 sons, all of whom are masters themselves and have their own schools and organizations as well. The Kang Tae Kwon Do System has schools in the New York Metropolitan Area and Puerto Rico. Also, they have established Tae Kwon Do clubs at MIT and Johns Hopkins University.

In April 2009, Kang was inducted into the Tae Kwon Do Hall of Fame.

=== Yong Taek Chung ===
Yong Taek Chung was born in Seoul, Korea on March 3, 1921. While his family had been highly respected and part of the educated class they lost everything during the Japanese occupation and, like most during that time, struggled for survival. Chung became interested in martial art as a boy but it was illegal at that time to openly teach or learn martial art in Korea. Not until he was a young man, at the age of 19, did Yong Taek Chung begin to train in the art of Tang Soo Do under the instruction of Won Kuk Lee. Sometime later, after martial art training became legal, Yong Taek Chung circulated among the later Chung Do Kwan students and he was to become almost a mythic figure because of his exploits. He was known for his toughness and bravery. Mr. Chung was to remain one of Lee's top students and kept a close relationship with his instructor for the rest of his life.

After Won Kuk Lee retired and moved to Japan Mr. Chung soon followed his teacher, settling in Tokyo and opening the first Chung Do Kwan Branch Club outside of Korea. In 1955 the Chung Do Kwan (like all Korean martial arts schools) officially adopted the name "Tae Kwon Do" for their martial art curriculum and so Master Chung found himself as a major figure in the Tokyo martial arts community serving as president of the All Japan Tae Kwon Do Association. In 1959, while still in Tokyo, Master Chung won the prestigious Tournament of Masters.

In 1974 Chung decided to bring his expertise to the Kansas City, Missouri in the United States. During Chung's time in Tokyo as well as in Kansas City he would regularly receive visits from his old instructor, Won Kuk Lee. It was during one of these visits in 1984 that Chung received the rank of 9th Dan. In 1988 Chung retired from teaching, turning his schools over to his students, and moved to Garden Grove, California. But remained active with his students and in retirement Yong Taek Chung spent the next 19 years helping students, instructors, and Masters continue the Chung Do Kwan tradition. Chung died on November 11, 2006, in his home in Fountain Valley, California.

=== Jhoon Rhee ===
Jhoon Rhee was a graduate of the Chung Do Kwan. Thus, Chung Do Kwan is often associated with what Rhee originally taught Americans. Rhee introduced Americans to the Oh Do Kwan Hyungs called Chang Hon, which were developed by Choi Hong Hi, Nam Tae Hi, Han Cha Kyo, Kong Young Il, Choi Chang Keun, Kim Bok Man and Park Jung Tae and are still used by the late Choi's ITF today (Cheon-Ji, Dan-Gun, Do-San, Won-Hyo, Yul-Gok, Jung-Geun, Toi-Gye, Hwa-Rang, Chung-Mu, Gwang-Gae). He did this at the urging of Choi, who wanted Taekwondo to establish its own Korean identity, something it couldn't do with Japanese forms. Jhoon Rhee states that he learned the Chang Hon forms from the South Korean Army Field Manual sent to him by Choi Hong Hi. The Chang Hon set of forms are still taught by independent American Taekwondo instructors who came from the Jhoon Rhee lineage. Rhee's 1970–1971 publication of the Chang Hon forms in a series of 5 separate books through Ohara Publications. Originally the ATA even used the Chang Hon forms until the 1980s, even today there are dozens of private American Taekwondo organizations that trace what they teach, and the forms they use, to a Chung Do Kwan/Chang Hon influence. Such organizations include: ITF, United States Taekwondo Federation (USTF), National Taekwondo Federation of America (NTFA), American Karate and Taekwondo Organization (AKATO), American Karate Black Belt Association (AKBBA), National Progressive Taekwondo Association (NPTA), etc.

=== Hae Man Park ===
Park Hae Man began his martial arts career when he saw a demonstration at the Seoul YMCA in 1949. After witnessing that demonstration, he asked his father if he could join the YMCA Kwon Bup Bu under Yoon Byung In. His father approved, and Park spent six months learning under Yoon before the Korean War broke out. Prior to training in the martial arts, Park was active as a gymnast. During the Korean War, Park was assigned to the ROK Army Signal Corps and served in the same unit as Uhm Woon Kyu. After the Korean War, Park studied under Uhm and eventually was promoted to 1st Dan in 1954. He first began teaching at Seoul National University in 1955 before becoming the Chief Taekwondo Instructor for the Presidential Protective Forces at the Bluehouse in 1962. Park taught at the Bluehouse for eighteen years. When Korea, first became a republic, the first President Park Chung Hee ordered 6 of the top martial arts to send their best fighter to be his bodyguard. Grandmaster Park was selected to represent Taekwondo. He was the presidential bodyguard for a long time and stayed at the Blue House (equivalent of the White House as blue is the royal colour of Korea). He is the President of the World Chung Do Kwan Association. This is the oldest school of Taekwondo, which started in 1944 before the official naming of the art. Currently, although Park has retired, he now travels all over the world updating Taekwondo standards. Pak Hae Man has many notable students amongst them, Grandmaster Edward B. Sell, the first non-Korean 9th dan, Grandmaster Brenda J. Sell, the 1st female Chung Do Kwan 9th Dan and 1st 9th Dan American-born Kukkiwon holder, (Frank Massar) of Massar Taekwondo and (Sheamus O'Neill) of World Taekwondo Association, Grandmaster Manny Sosa President/Founder of the Victory Taekwondo Chung Do Kwan Association, And Grandmaster Oscar Tajes President Argentina Chung Do Kwan Association/President Chung Do Kwan Latin America, Among others promoted to senior rank by Grandmaster Park Hae Man are Grandmaster Mark Iles (9th Dan), Grandmaster Andy Davies (9th Dan) and Grandmaster David McGoldrick (9th Dan) of UK Chung Do Kwan and GM Aristides Montalvo Santiago(9th Dan ) from Puerto Rico.

=== Young Sik Choi ===
Choi joined the Chung Do Kwan in 1958. He has trained with teachers such as Won Kuk Lee, Duk Sung Son, Yong Taek Chung, and Tae Hi Nam. Choi has won 12 gold medals in regional, national, and international contests. Trained in Taekwondo, Kung-Fu, Kumdo, and Yudo. He became a presidential bodyguard in 1970-1973 also he has taught troops in South Korea and China. In 1976 Choi was invited to the United States by Master Chung, Nak Young. In July 2004 Grandmaster Choi was tested for his 9th Degree Black Belt by Grandmaster Cho and Master Park, Hae Man. This degree was granted by Grandmaster Uhm, Woon Kyu, Head of Kukkiwon Institute, and Chung Do Kwan. Grandmaster Choi is the former President of T.T.C.A (Traditional Taekwondo Chung Do Kwan Association) which he founded on January 1, 1996.

== Technique and philosophy ==
Beginning in early times, Chung Do Kwan technique and philosophy centered on mastering basics, developing powerful technique, pinpoint accuracy in application, strong kicking, and deep appreciation for manners and etiquette. Its trademark techniques are the side kick, jumping side kick, and sliding side kick although it practices many other techniques as well—all in accordance with Chung Do Kwan principles. From the start, Lee Won Kuk wanted his students to be men of honor, only allowed upstanding individuals as his students, and encouraged them to live honorable lives as Chung Do Kwan students. All in an effort to restore the good reputation once held by Korean martial arts and distance itself from the notion of Taekwondo students as troublemakers.

Chung Do Kwan philosophy is that Taekwondo is a method of self-defense, self-improvement, and a Way of Life.

According to Hae Man Park, Vice-President of Chung Do Kwan (retired), today Chung Do Kwan is a social friendship club that endorses 100% the curriculum of the Kukkiwon system. Park states that Kukkiwon Taekwondo is Chung Do Kwan Taekwondo, and has been developed from the old systems of Chung Do Kwan and the other eight Kwans.

- We, as members, train our spirits and bodies according to the strict code.
- We, as members, are united in mutual friendship.
- We, as members, will comply with regulations and obey instructors.

Before students could become members of the Chung Do Kwan, Lee Won Kuk would have the prospective members read the Chung Do Kwan membership oath as well as sign a paper agreeing to abide by the oath. Today, some Chung Do Kwan affiliated schools have their members recite the membership oath before the start of each class and after to end each class.

== Logo ==
The Chung Do Kwan logo is the Korean Um/Yang symbol containing a clenched fist (symbolizing physical power) holding a scroll (symbolizing scholarliness). In a sense, balance is what Chung Do Kwan students should strive for in life. The two ends of the scroll contain the Korean Hangul characters for "Chung Do".

The Official Chung Do Kwan logos include the Hanja for "Blue Wave School": 靑濤館. The same logos include the Hanja for Blue Wave on the two ends of the scroll.

== Today ==
The Chung Do Kwan still exists in Korea and now functions as a fraternal friendship social club which is no longer a martial arts style. It, along with eight other recognized Kwans (Song Moo Kwan, Jidokwan, Chang Moo Kwan, Moo Duk Kwan, Han Moo Kwan, Jung Do Kwan, Kang Duk Won and Oh Do Kwan), formed the basis of the Korea Taekwondo Association, and the Kukkiwon.

The Chung Do Kwan still issues Dan and other types of certificates from its world headquarters in Seoul, South Korea. Chung Do Kwan members may also receive Kukkiwon poom and dan certification.

== Chung Do Kwan forms ==
According to Uhm Woon Kyu, the President of Taekwondo Chung Do Kwan (and former President of Kukkiwon), the Chung Do Kwan today follows the complete curriculum of Kukkiwon.

Some of the older Chung Do Kwan based schools practice the original Pyong-Ahn forms which LEE Won Kuk incorporated from Shotokan karate. (The Pyong-Ahn forms originated in Okinawa, where they are called Pinan. In Japan, these forms are called Heian.)

Schools tracing their lineage to Duk Sung Son when he founded the World Tae Kwon Do Association in the United States after leaving Korea also practice Kuk Mu forms.

Other older Chung do Kwan schools practice the Palgwae forms, a predecessor of the Taegeuk forms. After black belt, practitioners of the Kukkiwon system practice the Yudanja and Kodanja series of black belt Poomsae of the Kukkiwon (Koryo, Kumgang, Taebaek, Pyongwon, Sipjin, Jitae, Cheonkwon, Hansoo, Ilyo). Many Chung Do Kwan schools also practice the Chang Hun tul, even if they are not affiliated with the International Taekwon-Do Federation.
