= Tae Sun Kang =

American taekwondo practitioner (born 1962)

- Born: c. 1962; South Korea
- Other names: T. Kang
- Citizenship: American
- Teachers: Suh Chong Kang, Founder of Kuk Mu Kwan
- Rank: 10th dan
- Years active: 1967–present

Other information
- Occupation: Martial artist

Korean name
- Hangul: 강태선
- Hanja: 姜泰宣
- RR: Gang Taeseon
- MR: Kang T'aesŏn

Tae Sun Kang (Korean: 강태선; born c. 1962) is a South Korean-born martial artist and author known for founding several prominent Taekwondo academies in the United States. Kang is a Grandmaster, awarded the 10th Dan Black Belt in 2020.

== Early years in South Korea ==
Tae Sun Kang was born in South Korea to Hisoo Kang and Suh Chong Kang. Kang started his martial arts training in 1967 under his father, who himself was awarded a 10th Dan Black Belt and the title of Great Grandmaster. His brothers are Grandmasters Ho-sun Kang and Chung-Sun Kang.

== Career in United States ==
In 1969, Kang emigrated to the United States along with his family. Soon after arrival, Kang continued practicing Taekwondo at his father's newly established martial arts school, the New York Taekwondo Academy. In 1973, Kang received his 1st Dan Black Belt. At 13, Kang started working at the New York Taekwondo Academy, and was named Head Instructor two years later, by 1977. At 22 years old, Kang bought the academy outright from his father in exchange for paying off debt and living expenses for 20 years. In 1982, he was appointed Vice-President of the American Black Belt Federation and Director of M.I.T. Taekwondo Program, and by 1986, Kang received his 7th Dan Black Belt.

In 1989, Kang founded the Johns Hopkins Taekwondo Program, in Baltimore, Maryland. A year later, he was declared the Director of the program. In 1992 he Founded the American Black Belt Association. He later became the president of the International Taekwondo Black Belt Association, which he and his brother Grandmaster Ho-Sun Kang operate.

Between 1990 and 2002, Kang established several Taekwondo schools under the 'T. Kang Taekwondo' (TKT) brand in New York City, often teaching at these locations in-person.

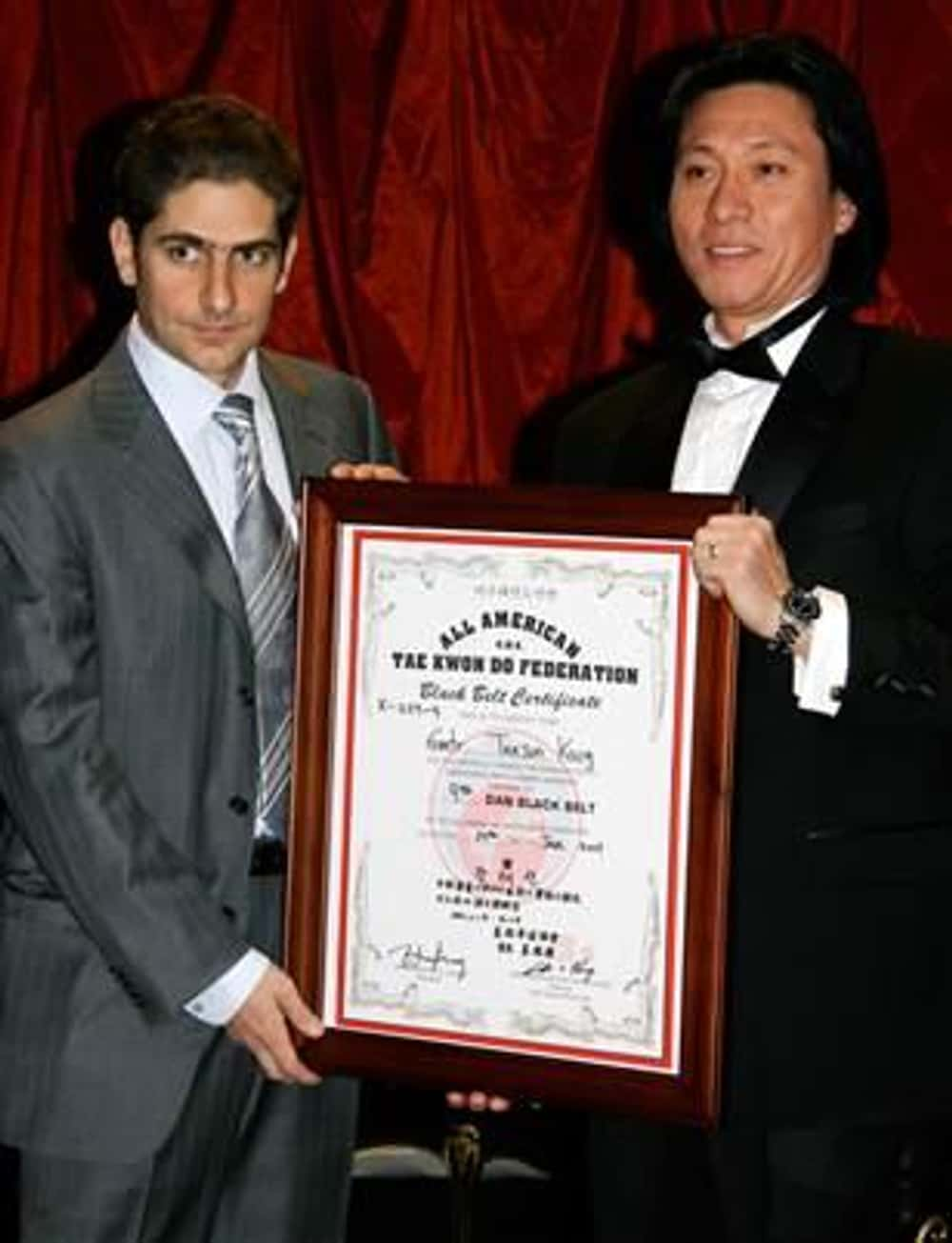
Michael Imperioli, left, presents Grandmaster Tae Sun Kang with a plaque recognizing Kang's installation as an American Tae Kwon Do Federation 9th Dan Black Belt.

By 2004, he had been operating ten affiliated martial arts schools, including a branch in Puerto Rico. In 2007, Actor Michael Imperioli cited Kang's instruction as a significant influence on his personal development. He has been a long-time student of Kang, appearing in several of his later instructional media releases. Kang's father, Suh Chong Kang, promoted Kang to the rank of 10th Dan Black Belt on January 25, 2020.

Kang was inducted into the Official Taekwondo Hall of Fame in 2024. After this induction, he was appointed Vice President of the organization. Kang has individually promoted thousands of Black Belts.

Taekwondo Dan History
Rank	Year	Awarding Organization
1st Dan Black Belt	1973	New York Taekwondo Academy
7th Dan Black Belt	1986	—
9th Dan Black Belt	2007	All American Tae Kwon Do Federation
10th Dan Black Belt	2020	All American Tae Kwon Do Federation

== Works ==
Kang, Tae Sun (2006). Traditional Taekwondo Forms Vol 1 [DVD]. Screenstyle. Featuring Michael Imperioli.

Kang, Tae Sun (2006). Traditional Taekwondo Forms Vol 2 [DVD]. Screenstyle. Featuring Michael Imperioli.

Tae Kwon Do Times Issue #158, featuring Michael Imperioli & Tae Sun Kang - July 2007

Tae Kwon Do Times Issue #208, featuring Tae Sun Kang & Je Wook Kim – November 2015

Kang, Tae Sun (2017). Black Belt Fitness for Life: A 7-Week Plan to Achieve Lifelong Wellness. Tuttle Publishing. ISBN 0804849129. Foreword by actor Michael Imperioli.

== See also ==
- Sun Chong Kang - Kang's Teacher and Father
- List of Taekwondo Grandmasters - Kang can be found under: Other taekwondo systems
