= Lynne Russell =

American journalist and author (born 1946)

- Born: November 1, 1946 (age 79); New Jersey, U.S.
- Education: University of Colorado
- Occupations: Journalist, author
- Years active: 1978–present
- Children: 1

Lynne Russell (born November 1, 1946) is an American journalist and author. She was the first woman to solo anchor a prime time network nightly newscast as the host of CNN Headline News from 1983 to 2001, as well as six years as co-host of The Week in Review with Bob Cain on CNN.

== Early life and education ==
Russell was born in New Jersey, and raised across the United States as the only daughter of United States Army officer John Russell and homemaker Carmela Pasqualina Evangelista. Russell graduated from Manzano High School in Albuquerque, New Mexico.

She attended the University of Colorado in Boulder, where she studied nursing, but she left school and instead pursued a career in broadcasting.

== Career ==
=== Television and radio ===
Before joining CNN Headline News in 1983, Russell anchored the evening news on KENS in San Antonio in 1980, where she also was an investigative and courthouse reporter. Previously, she served a year as a news anchor and military correspondent for KHON-TV in Honolulu.

From 1978 to 1979 Russell anchored and reported at WTLV-TV in Jacksonville, Florida. Also, from 1971 to 1978 she was Program Director, as well as anchor and host, of a four-hour weekday morning news and interview program at WKAT in Miami.

Russell was the first recipient of the Russell P. Jandoli Excellence in Journalism Award presented by St. Bonaventure University of Western New York.

Russell lived in Toronto for several years, working for CBC Television beginning in 2006 and then at radio station CFRB from 2008 to 2010.

==== Private investigator and law enforcement ====
Russell is a licensed private investigator who worked as a detective. She also is a first degree black belt in Choi Kwang-Do, and has worked as a bodyguard and Fulton County Deputy Sheriff in the Reserve division.

==== Author ====
Russell's first book was How to Win Friends, Kick A** and Influence People: A Memoir. Published on November 30, 1999, she shared her life story, including her global travels in her youth and her experiences as a private investigator and bodyguard.

Russell has written two novels in her PJ Santini series, Hell on Heels and Heels of Fortune.

== Survived shootout ==
She and her husband Chuck de Caro were on a cross-country trip from Washington, D.C. to California and were spending the night of June 30, 2015 at a Motel 6 in Albuquerque, New Mexico, when an armed man forced his way into their room. De Caro was shot three times; he returned fire, mortally wounding the intruder. De Caro was taken to a hospital for two weeks and recovered. De Caro and Russell filed a lawsuit against Motel 6 and related parties on October 13, 2015, for alleged negligent and reckless security resulting in severe injury, negligent infliction of emotional distress, loss of consortium and Unfair Trade Practices Act violations to motel operators and employees. The suit was dismissed with prejudice on October 18, 2017.
