= Nam Tae-hi =

South Korean martial artist (1929–2013)

- Born: 19 March 1929; Keijō, Keiki-dō, Korea, Empire of Japan
- Died: 7 November 2013 (aged 84); Garden Grove, California, United States
- Style: Taekwondo
- Teacher: Won-kuk Lee
- Rank: 9th dan taekwondo

Other information
- Notable students: Han Cha-kyo, Jhoon-goo Rhee

Nam Tae-hi (Korean: 남태희; Hanja: 南太熙; 19 March 1929 – 7 November 2013) was a pioneering South Korean master of taekwondo and is known as the "Father of Vietnamese Taekwondo". With Choi Hong-hi, he co-founded the "Oh Do Kwan" and led the twelve original masters of taekwondo of the Korea Taekwon-Do Association (KTA).

== Early life ==
Nam was born in March 1929 in Keijō (Seoul), Korea, Empire of Japan. He began training in the martial arts in 1946, training after school for five nights each week. Nam's training continued in the Chung Do Kwan under Lee Won-kuk. It has been claimed that Nam introduced Bok-man Kim (a pioneering master and one of the technical founders of taekwondo, working with Choi) to taekkyeon in 1948, but other sources indicate Nam did not meet Bok-man Kim until 1954.

== Career ==
While a captain in the South Korean military forces, Nam met Choi, and acted as Choi's second-in-command in the early days of taekwondo. Nam was pivotal in the development of taekwondo, and was called Choi's "right-hand man" in the latter's official biography. In 1954, at the rank of 2nd dan, Nam participated in a military demonstration of martial arts for the president of South Korea, Syngman Rhee, and broke 13 roof tiles with a downward punch; Rhee was reportedly so impressed that he subsequently ordered all Korean military personnel to undergo training in martial arts.

In March 1959, Nam was a member of the first Korean taekwondo demonstration team to travel overseas, demonstrating his martial art in Vietnam and Taiwan. Around this time, he was appointed president of the Asia Taekwon-Do Federation, and was also one of the founding directors of the KTA. In 1962, Nam was appointed as chief instructor of taekwondo for the Vietnamese army, and came to be known as the Father of Taekwondo in Vietnam. Nam designed the Chang Hon taekwondo patterns Hwa-Rang hyung, Chung-Mu hyung, and UI-Ji hyung.

== Later life ==
Nam moved to the Chicago area in 1972, opened a dojang in 1973, and later lived in Los Angeles. He appears on Chang-keun Choi's list of taekwondo pioneers. In 2007, he was inducted into the Taekwondo Hall of Fame.

After being admitted to hospital due to pneumonia, Nam died on 7 November 2013 in Garden Grove, California, USA.

== See also ==
- List of taekwondo grandmasters
