= Ki-ha =

- Hangul: 기하
- RR: Giha
- MR: Kiha

Ki-ha is a Korean given name.

- Rhee Ki-ha (born 1938), South Korean taekwondo master
- Jang Ki-ha (born 1982), South Korean singer
- Shin Ki-ha (1941–1997), South Korean politician

== See also ==
- List of Korean given names
