= Won-kuk Lee =

South Korean martial artist

Lee Won-kuk
- Born: 13 April 1907; Hanseong, Korea (now Seoul, South Korea)
- Died: 2 February 2003 (aged 95); Arlington County, Virginia, U.S.
- Style: Shotokan Karate, Tang Soo Do, Taekwondo, taekkyon
- Teachers: Gichin Funakoshi, Gigō Funakoshi
- Rank: 10th degree black Belt in Tang Soo Do; 4th degree black belt in Shotokan

Other information
- Notable students: Duk Sung-son, Suh Chong-kang, Choi Hong-hi, Frank Massar

Lee Won-kuk (Korean: 이원국; Hanja: 李元國; April 13, 1907 – February 2, 2003) was a South Korean martial artist, who founded Chung Do Kwan. He introduced karate to Korea in 1944, creating his own style known as Tang Soo Do Chung Do Kwan style, which became Taekwondo as of 1955; instilling a profound influence in this martial art through teaching future masters and authoring the book “Tae Kwon Do handbook“ in 1968.

== Early life and education ==
Lee Won-kuk was born on April 13, 1907, in Hanseong (now Seoul, the capital of South Korea), which was occupied by Japan and whose regimen regulated all of the population's activities on the Korean Peninsula. It prohibited the practice or teachings of any martial arts, so those interested, had to go outside of Korea (either China or Japan) to learn the arts. Lee was interested in martial arts at an early age and used to get together with his elders in Seoul to listen to old stories on the practice of millennial Korean martial arts like Taekkyeon.

It was a custom for affluent Korean families to send their children to study in Japan, where they would learn Japanese, obtain the best education possible, get to know the right contacts and improve their chances of success in a Japanese-dominated society. In 1926, Lee traveled to Tokyo, where he attended high school and later Chuo University specializing in law. During his school years, he started training in shotokan under the tutelage of Gichin Funakoshi and his son Gigō Funakoshi, who was the instructor in charge of Chuo's karate club. It was there that Lee became one of the first students of karate in Japan, obtaining the highest rank for a non-Japanese. After graduation, he toured Japan, visiting Okinawa, and many other cities in China including centers where Chuan Fa (kung-fu) was taught.

== Return to Korea ==
Lee eventually understood the meaning of his martial arts learning and saw how the history and legacy of original Korean martial arts were being erased from his own culture. So he returned to Korea to teach martial arts in his homeland using his connections with high-ranking Japanese officials, who allowed him to gain employment at the ministry of transportation.

In 1944, Won-kuk made an official request to the Japanese Governor General in Korea and an army general, Nobuyuki Abe, to teach karate to Japanese residents of Korea and later a select group of Koreans. The permit was denied twice but finally given after a third petition. Lee started teaching Tang Soo Do (which in Korean means "way of the Chinese hand") at the Yung Shin school gym in Okchun-dong, Seodaemun District, in Seoul. He named his school Chung Do Kwan, which can be translated as "school of the blue wave."

After the Korean Peninsula was liberated on August 15, 1945, a wave of political and social unrest forced Lee to move his school to the Sichungyo church in the Kyunji-dong section of Seoul. Using his own resources, he taught tang soo do independently and after a year, he showed the efficacy of his art to the new government. Soon after, he obtained the support of public institutions and began teaching at the national police headquarters, universities in Seoul and the army.

During that time, Chung Do Kwan reflected the training Lee received from the Funakoshis years before, stressing basic movements, forms (Korean: hyung; Japanese: kata), three- and one-step sparring, and makiwara training. The style quickly gained popularity and Lee's teaching grabbed national attention. In 1947, President Syngman Rhee asked for all schools of martial arts to join the government party, offering Lee the position of internal affairs minister. Lee declined and was incarcerated under suspicion of leading a band of assassins. According to Lee, other high-ranking members of Chung Do Kwan were also persecuted and tortured. Other sources say Lee was incarcerated for supporting the Japanese colonial regime. He was freed in 1950 and moved to Japan that year.

=== From Tang Soo Do to Tae Kwon Do ===
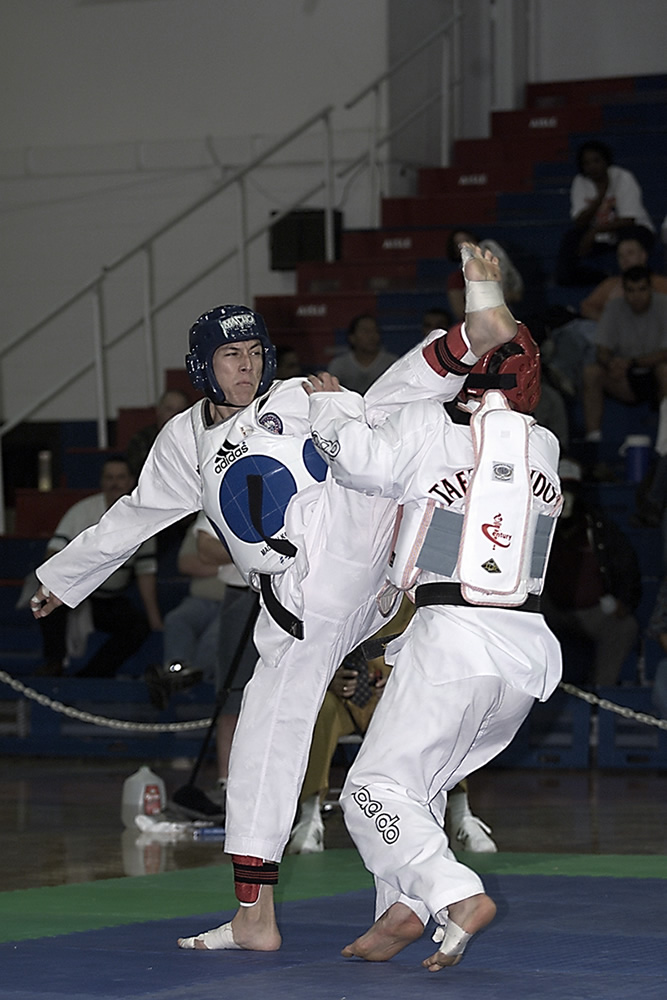
Sparring match in the style of the World Taekwondo Federation

Lee was one of the first Koreans to study karate in Japan. He was among many early Korean Taekwondo masters who learned karate while studying at Japanese universities or training with the Japanese imperial army and later returned to Korea with a first or second-degree black belt. Many schools were founded in the late 1940s and early 1950s and referred to the martial art “Korean karate.”

Lee called his art Tang Soo Do, the Korean pronunciation of the Japanese term “Karate-Do” during the 1920s, using the Chinese character tang (唐). All of the original Tang Soo Do schools taught the original Okinawa-Japanese kata, dressed in the traditional kimono and taught karate with little influence from the millenary taekkyeon martial arts. The peak of Chung Do Kwan led to the opening of schools ran by Lee's students or through their technical support and his promotional impulses. This is how his students established their own schools. Nam Tae-hi under the direction of Choi Hong-hi (Ohdokwan), Lee Yong-woo (Jungdokwan), Ko Jae-chun (Chungryongkwan), Kang Suh-chang (Kukmookwan) schools were created and developed.

Taekwondo is one of the newest Eastern martial arts, and its story started with the opening of Chung Do Kwan in Seoul in 1944.

=== Chung Do Kwan ===
The term "Chung Do Kwan" can be translated as “School of the Blue Wave”. On how he came up with the name, Lee said,

“I was seating at a beach in Korea, looking at the waves crash upon the shore. Suddenly, it came to me the name ‘Blue Wave’ (Chung Do) and I thought it would be a great name for the school. I didn't want to name my school shotokan because a son should have a different name from his father.”

The first master of Chung Do Kwan was Lee, a title he held from 1944 to 1950, followed by Duk Sung Son (1950–59), who was left in charge directly by Lee and left the position due to differences with high-ranking members. General Choi Hong-hi (1959) acted as temporary school master. Woon Kyu-uhm (1959–present) was named as successor by a committee of high-ranking members.

In its early years, Chungdokwan taught 10 hand and eight kicking techniques to the body's vital points. The hand techniques were punch, spear hand, knife hand, ridge hand (done with the inside edge of the hand created by the thumb and the index finger), eye gouge with two fingers to the eyes, attack with one finger, reverse punch and tiger hand. The kicking techniques consisted of the front, side, crescent and back kicks to different body parts. The school kept two trends with characteristics and training philosophies considerably different from each other.

The branch of the school ran by Woon headquartered in Seoul and whose associates are affiliated with World Taekwondo, which is governed by Kukkiwon lineaments, is what is known as Olympic tae kwon do today. Chung Do Kwan in Korea is a social club not necessarily offering official tournaments or other activities on its own.

A second branch of the school that is less known was developed by Duk Sung-son, who followed his teachings independently in an orthodox or traditional way, without belonging to a federated sport association and keeping the same training system, forms, uniforms and philosophies taught originally by Lee. This school was developed mostly in the United States, Venezuela and Australia.

=== Black Belts promoted by early Chung Do Kwan ===
First generation promoted by Lee Won-kuk (1944–50)

- Duk Sung-son (founder of World Taekwondo Association in New York / independent)
- Suh Chong-kang (founder of Kuk Mu Kwan - aligned with International Taekwon-Do Federation, received 10th-degree black belt during 2000s by Lee).
- HYUN Jong-myun (co-founder of Oh Do Kwan and ITF)
- UHM Woon-kyu (co-founder of World Taekwondo Federation and head of Chung Do Kwan in Korea)
- Young Taek-chung (served as vice president of World Taekwondo Association, received ninth-degree black belt in 1984 from Lee in Kansas City, Missouri)
- LEE Yong-woo (founder of Jung Do Kwan aligned with World Taekwondo Federation)

Second-generation black belts promoted by Duk Sung Son (1951–59)

- Choi Hong Hi (founder of Oh Do Kwan and International Taekwon-Do Federation, received honorary fourth dan in 1952, named honorary chief of school)
- Nam Tae-hi (co-founder of Oh Do Kwan and ITF)
- BAEK Joon-ki (co-founder of Oh Do Kwan and ITF)
- KO Jae-chun (co-founder of Oh Do Kwan and ITF)
- KWAK Kuen-sik (co-founder of Oh Do Kwan and ITF)
- KIM Suk-kyu (co-founder of Oh Do Kwan and ITF)
- HAN Cha-kyo (co-founder of Oh Do Kwan and ITF)
- MIN Woon-sik
- HAN In-sook

== Legacy ==
During the highest peak of the Chung Do Kwan, it gathered more than 50,000 participants. During the decade of 1940 and beginning of the 50s, its trainings and teachings were considered the best and the most authentic. Actually, it is estimated that Tae Kwon Do students exceed 70,000,000 around the world.

A great number of schools that followed the Chun Do Kwan were influenced somehow by the effort of the pioneer of the modern Korean martial arts. In 1951, Lee retired from teaching and left the leadership of the school to Duk Sung-son. In the following years, he would visit his old students, who were recognized later as “Masters,” and acted as judge in tournaments, belt test promotions and other events. He always criticized the changes that were made to the martial art and those who valued the sport aspect of it and put aside the philosophical bases of the style.

== Personal life ==
In 1976, Lee immigrated to the U.S. with his wife, settling in Arlington, Virginia, in the Washington metropolitan area. There, he dedicated his time to calligraphy, acupuncture, and occasional interviews. He died from pneumonia at an Arlington hospital on February 2, 2003. The eulogy at his funeral was read by one of his students, Chung Yong-taek.
