= Suh Chong Kang =

Taekwondo practitioner (1929–2022)

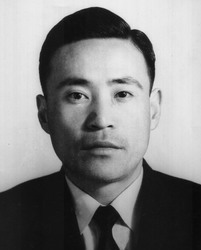
- Suh Chong Kang
- Born: September 29, 1929; Sinuiju, Korea, Empire of Japan
- Died: January 30, 2022 (aged 92); United States
- Citizenship: Korean
- Teachers: Won Kuk Lee, Founder of Chung Do Kwan
- Rank: 10th dan Tae Kwon Do, Kuk Mu Kwan
- Years active: 1938-c.2022

Other information
- Occupation: Martial artist
- Children: Taekwondo Grandmasters Chung Sun Kang, Ho Sun Kang, and Tae Sun Kang
- Known for establishing Taekwondo in the United States. Inducted into the Taekwondo Hall of Fame.

- Suh Chong Kang
- Hangul: 강서종
- RR: Gang Seojong
- MR: Kang Sŏjong

Suh Chong Kang (Korean: 강서종) was a South Korean martial artist and instructor who was a central figure in the establishment of Taekwondo in the United States. He was a Great Grandmaster, awarded the 10th Dan Black Belt.

== Early years in South Korea ==
Suh Chong Kang was born September 29, 1929, in Shineuju Korea, purportedly as the eldest of nine siblings, to industrialist Young Jhoon Kang and the daughter of former mayor Hang Jang Myun. Kang started his martial arts training as a boy in 1938, with his father passing away around that time. He practiced Su Bahk Do and Judo, and later became a student of Tang Soo Do/Kong Soo Do under Lee Won-kuk, Founder of Chung Do Kwan. Kang was a graduate of the first class of Chung Do Kwan black belts. In 1946 and 1948 respectively, Lee presented Kang with his 1st and 2nd Dan black belts.

Kang graduated Dong Kuk University in Seoul, South Korea, in 1949. On August 10th 1953, Kang founded his own branch of taekwondo, naming it Kuk Mu Kwan. From 1957 to 1969 Kang served as the head martial arts instructor of the Korean Military Intelligence Agency. From 1960 to 1968, he was the commanding instructor for the Republic of Korea Army.

== Career in United States ==
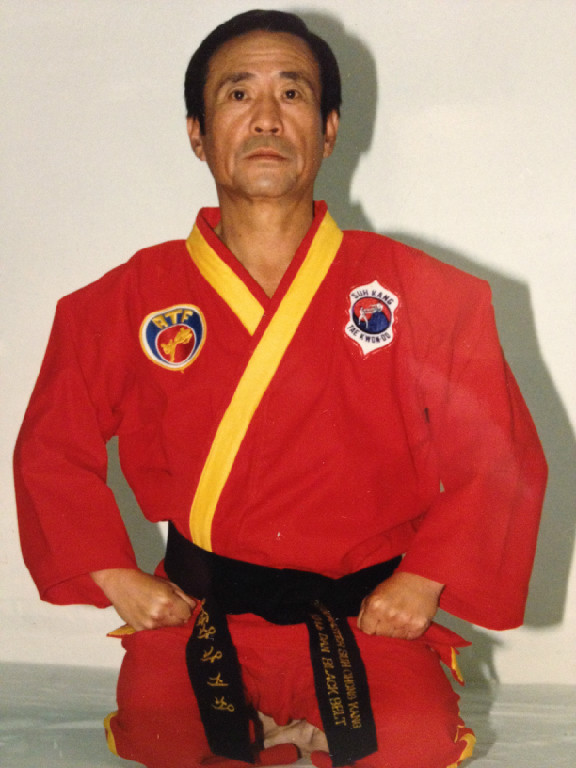
Suh Chong Kang C. 1980

In 1969, Kang and his family emigrated to the United States. While working as a janitor in a boxing gym, Kang was discovered striking the heavy bags early one morning. Believing the reverberating sounds to be gunshots, the boxers at the gym were astounded to discover that the “gunshots” they heard were, in fact, the sound of Kang hitting the bag. These boxers became his first crop of students in the United States. Already an 8th Dan Black Belt, he founded his own Tae Kwon Do academy in Brooklyn, New York.

In 1973, Kang was a chief referee for the Third Annual International Open Karate/Tae Kwon Do Championships located in Hempstead, New York, which attracted 2,000 spectators.

Kang became the first President of the American Tae Kwon Do Association (ATA), serving from 1969 to 1978.

In the late 1970's, Kang served as the Vice President of the International Tae Kwon Do Federation. He was also the Chairman of the All American Tae Kwon Do Federation, based in Brooklyn.

Before his death, Lee Won-kuk promoted Kang to the rank of 10th Dan Black Belt. He was the first one of the original Chung Do Kwan Black Belts to receive this honor.

Suh Chong Kang died peacefully in his sleep on January 30, 2022.

== Legacy ==
Kang practiced martial arts for approximately 80 years and had been teaching students for most of that time. This tradition was passed on to his family: Kang's three sons Ho-sun Kang, Tae Sun Kang and Chung-Sun Kang, are Tae Kwon Do Grandmasters who continue to teach Kang's system in their own Tae Kwon Do schools and organizations. Kang's grandchildren Samantha Kang and Tommy Kang both hold 6th Dan black belts in Taekwondo.

On April 10, 2009, Kang was inducted into the Taekwondo Hall of Fame. This induction certificate was presented by Grandmaster Kim Pyung Soo in Teaneck, N.J.

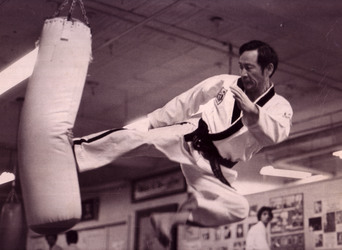
