= Master Rhee =

Master Rhee is the abbreviated name of several taekwondo masters, as 이 (Lee/Rhee/Yi) is a common Korean family name. The three most widely known bearers of the name are probably:

- Chong Chul Rhee, known as the Father of Australian Taekwondo
- Jhoon Goo Rhee (1932–2018), known as the Father of American Taekwondo
- Ki Ha Rhee (born 1938), known as the Father of British Taekwondo
