= Rhee Ki-ha =

Martial artist

Rhee Ki Ha
- K. H. Rhee, 2004
- Born: 20 March 1938 (age 87); Seoul, Korea
- Style: Taekwon-Do
- Rank: 9th dan Taekwon-Do (ITF); 4th dan in Judo; 2nd dan in Karate

Other information
- Notable students: Robert Howard

Rhee Ki Ha (born 20 March 1938) is a South Korean Grandmaster of Taekwon-Do. He is widely recognised as the 'Father of British Taekwon-Do' for introducing the martial art to the United Kingdom since arriving in 1967. He is also considered the 'Father of Irish Taekwon-Do', and is one of the twelve original masters of taekwondo of the Korea Taekwon-Do Association. Following a career in the South Korean military, GM Rhee emigrated to the UK in 1967. He was a notable officer of the International Taekwon-Do Federation (ITF) during Choi Hong-hi's leadership.

== Early life ==
Rhee was born on 20 March 1938 in Seoul, Korea, during the period of Japanese occupation. He is the eldest of seven children of Rhee Yung-ei and Ahn Soon-rae. Rhee's martial arts training began when he was around 7 or 8 years of age, learning judo from his father, and he was the only one of his siblings to pursue the martial arts. He later learned karate from one of his schoolteachers.

When Rhee served in the South Korean military forces, he came into contact with Choi Hong-hi and learned taekwondo in the 35th Infantry Division. Rhee was a key figure in the introduction of taekwondo across the world, contributing to demonstrations in many different countries. He later taught taekwondo to the US 8th Army and, in 1964, travelled to Singapore, where he trained Royal Air Force (RAF) personnel at RAF Changi. Through the late 1960s and 1970s, Rhee was a key member of the taekwondo demonstration teams that accompanied H. H. Choi around the world.

== United Kingdom ==
In 1967, some of his students in the RAF, who had returned to the United Kingdom, invited Rhee to travel there to teach. He arrived at Heathrow Airport, London, on 2 July 1967, and was ranked 5th dan at the time. Reportedly, Rhee only planned to stay for two years, but ended up settling there. Rhee Ki-ha founded the United Kingdom Taekwon-Do Association (UKTA) in 1967, and the Republic of Ireland Taekwon-Do Association in 1972, at which time he was ranked 5th dan, and the All European Taekwon-Do Association in 1979. He was promoted to the rank of 7th dan either by 1973 or in 1974, according to different sources. Rhee attained the rank of 8th dan in 1981, and was the first person promoted to 9th dan by H. H. Choi on 1 July 1997 in Saint Petersburg, Russia, taking from that point onwards the honorific of "First" Grand Master Rhee (FGMR) Rhee was also described by Choi as "the best ever student of Taekwon-Do."

Rhee is currently Vice President of one of the three ITF organisations. He is listed as the "Founder of Taekwon-Do in Great Britain and Ireland" in the Taekwondo Hall of Fame. He is listed as a pioneer in Europe (1950s, 1960s, and 1970s) in Choi Chang-keun's list of taekwondo pioneers.

== Personal life ==
Rhee married Heather Morris, sister of the UKTA's official photographer, in 1969. Their eldest son, Andrew Kang-hae Rhee (born 1970), is an 8th dan Senior Master, Taekwon-Do instructor based in Sydney, Australia.

== See also ==
- List of taekwondo grandmasters
- Master Rhee
