= Choi Kwang Do =

Martial art

- Also known as: CKD
- Focus: Striking
- Country of origin: United States
- Official website: http://www.choikwangdo.com

Choi Kwang Do is a martial art developed by Grandmaster Kwang Jo Choi (Choi Kwang-jo) between 1978 and 1987. The style relies on bent legs and arms when striking, combined with hunched up postures. Choi Kwang Do's syllabus consists almost entirely of forms with little to no pressure testing nor contact sparring.

== History ==
Choi Kwang Do was founded by Choi Kwang-jo on March 2, 1987. Choi Kwang-jo was born in South Korea before emigrating to United States in the early 1970s. Choi was a successful ITF Tae Kwon Do practitioner and trainer (serving as a chief instructor) before establishing his own style.

While teaching and demonstrating ITF Tae Kwon Do in South East Asia, Choi Kwang-jo became injured through his training and demonstrations to the point where he was unable to continue with the discipline. So he left Malaysia (where he was demonstrating at the time) for North America, in the hope of finding orthopedic surgeons who would be able to help with his injuries. Determining that the injuries were caused by the way he was performing martial arts, Choi undertook rehabilitative exercises, attended various seminars and studied techniques for rehabilitation. Choi incorporated these techniques into his own fighting style, and from that he developed Choi Kwang Do.

Today, Choi Kwang Do is headquartered in Atlanta, Georgia by one organization and Temperance, Michigan by another organization. It is taught in numerous countries including the United Kingdom with schools in England, Scotland and Wales, and Puerto Rico with schools in Guaynabo, Las Piedras, Caguas and San Lorenzo, Malaysia and Argentina, among others.

== Style and training ==
Choi Kwang Do emphasizes the use of biomechanics, and to employ a number of modern disciplines, such as kinesiology and psychology, in its design. The result is a tendency towards the use of natural bilateral movement and fluid sequential motion to develop optimum force on impact to place less pressure on the joints. The style also incorporates breathing and stretching exercises from yoga.

Choi Kwang Do is a non-competitive martial art with no pressure testing (participants are instead encouraged to measure their success against their own past milestones), but for a natural and effective response to everyday stimuli and training is a mix of contact drills using pads and shields, non-contact drills and "in-fighting" close-quarter drills. Therefore, the pacifist can also practice Choi Kwang Do, as the ideals focus on self development, be it physical health goals, self confidence or preparation for self defence situation. It does not rely on mass to create strength, making it accessible to women and children as well as men.

== Health considerations ==
A 2018 injury survey found that the annual rate of injury is 11.73 for every 100 Choi Kwang Do practitioners meaning it is a "safe martial art that adults of all ages can participate in", with no correlation between the length of training experience and injury. The most common causes of injury were cited as improper technique and overexertion.

== Practitioners ==
Notable practitioners of the Choi Kwang Do style include:

- Choi Kwang-jo (founder) – inducted into the Taekwondo Times Magazine Hall of Fame, 2006.
- Lynne Russell – Deputy Sheriff, Private Investigator and author of How to Win Friends, Kick Ass and Influence People.
- Catriona Gray – Miss Universe 2018, and Filipino television host, singer, model, and stage actress.

== Grading system ==
Choi Kwang Do uses a system of colored belts for ranking. Each color rank also has a corresponding "Senior" rank which is differentiated with a horizontal black stripe through the middle of the belt. For black belt ranks, a dan system is used from 1st through 9th dan. The rank of 9th dan is only held by Choi Kwang-jo.

Belt System
White
White Senior
Yellow
Yellow Senior
Gold
Gold Senior
Orange
Orange Senior
Green
Green Senior
Blue
Blue Senior
Purple
Purple Senior
Red
Red Senior
Brown
Brown Senior
Black

== Criticism ==
Choi Kwang Do has been criticised for claiming it is "proven" to be the most effective martial arts system in the world (as claimed on the CKD official website). Choi Kwang Do has never been able to substantiate this claim yet.

Due to the claims that Choi Kwang Do is the most effective martial art, it has drawn criticism in online forums.
