= Kim Bok Man =

South Korean taekwondo practitioner (1934–2021)

Bok Man-Kim
- 김복만

Personal details
- Born: 3 December 1934
- Died: 14 August 2021 (aged 86) West Orange, New Jersey, U.S.

Korean name
- Hangul: 김복만
- Hanja: 金福萬
- RR: Gim Bokman
- MR: Kim Pongman

Kim Bok-man (Korean: 김복만; Hanja: 金福萬; December 3, 1934 – August 14, 2021), 11th dan, was an early pioneer of taekwondo in the 1950s and 1960s in Southeast Asia, particularly Vietnam, Indonesia, the Philippines, Malaysia, Singapore and Hong Kong. He started martial arts training in the Korean art of taekyun in 1941 at 7. While he was a Sergeant Major in the South Korean army, he was called to Malaysia by General Choi Hong-hi Korea's ambassador, to teach taekwondo to members of the government party in Malaysia and subsequently to develop taekwondo, particularly some of the forms created by General Choi, and another martial art called Chun Kuhn taekwondo.

Bok-Man Kim died on August 14, 2021, at 86.

== Ch'ang Hon Patterns ==
Kim Bok-man and Woo Jae-lim helped General Choi develop 15 tuls, or patterns, between 1962 and 1964 while Gen. Choi served as the Korean Ambassador to Malaysia. In no particular order, these tuls are: Chon-Ji, Dan-Gun, Do-San, Won-Hyo, Yul-Gok, Joong-Gun, Toi-Gye, Kwang-Gae, Po-Eun, Choon-Jang, Ko-Dang, Yoo-Sin, Choi-Yong, Se-Jong, and Tong-Il. In addition, Kim Bok-man has said that he had some but considerably less input on five additional tuls – Hwa-Rang, Eui-Am, Se-Jong, Chung-Mu and Gye-Baek – bringing the total to 20. The only Ch'ang Hon patterns that Kim did not have any input or influence on are Juche, Sam-Il, Yeon-Gae, Eul-Ji, Mun-Mu and Seo-San.

== Books ==
Kim Bok-man is the author of several books on martial arts.

Practical Taekwon-Do: Weapon Techniques. 1979: Sunlight Publishing.

Chun Kuhn Do: The Complete Wellness Art. 2002: World Chun Kuhn Do Federation. ISBN 9780971788503.

Taekwondo: Defense Against Weapons. 2012: YMAA Publication Center. ISBN 978-1594392276. Selected as a Best Books Award finalist by USA Book News in 2012. This book reprints Practical Taekwon-Do: Weapon Techniques from 1979 with minor layout changes.

Taekwon-Do: Origins of the Art: Bok-man Kim's Historic Photospective (1955-2015). 2015: Moosul Publishing, LLC. ISBN 0996264000. Selected as a Best Book Award finalist by USA Book News in June 2015, and a finalist in the International Book Awards in May 2016

== See also ==
- Taekwondo in the Philippines
