= Choi Chang-keun =

South Korean martial artist

Choi Chang-keun OC
- Born: 1941 (age 84–85); Korea
- Style: Taekwondo
- Teachers: Choi Hong-hi, Lim Woo-jong
- Rank: 9th dan taekwondo (ITF); 4th dan karate

Other information
- Website: http://www.taekwondopioneers.com/

Choi Chang-keun OC (Korean: 최창근; Hanja: 崔昌根; born 1941), widely known as C. K. Choi, is a South Korean–Canadian master of taekwondo, and one of the twelve original masters of taekwondo of the Korea Taekwon-Do Association. Following a career in the South Korean military, Choi emigrated to Canada in 1969, where he continues to teach his martial art.

== Early life ==
Choi was born around 1941 in Korea, during the period of Japanese occupation. He began training in the martial arts in 1956, studying taekwondo and karate under instructors Hong and Kim in the South Korean army, and subsequently trained under Lim Woo-jong, Director of Taekwondo for the Korean 1st Army. By 1960, Choi had attained the rank of 2nd dan in taekwondo. In 1961, he helped Choi Hong-hi to create many of the present day Chang Hon patterns, Ge-Baek hyung.

In 1962, Woo promoted Choi to the rank of 3rd dan. That same year, Choi became the first taekwondo world champion in sparring and patterns, and then became the first tae soo do world champion (full contact, heavyweight, 3rd–5th dan division) in 1963. He later became one of the twelve original masters of taekwondo and taught in Malaysia. Through the late 1960s and 1970s, Choi was a key member of the taekwondo demonstration teams that accompanied H. H. Choi around the world.

== Canada ==
Choi moved to Vancouver, British Columbia, Canada, in 1969. He opened the first taekwondo school there in 1970. He also established the University of British Columbia's taekwondo club in the 1970s. In 1973, Choi held the rank of 7th dan.

In 1980, Choi designed the International Taekwon-Do Federation's (ITF) tree logo that is worn on the back of every ITF uniform. He attained the rank of 8th dan in 1981, promoted by H. H. Choi, and 9th dan in 2002.

Choi has started a campaign to reunite ITF practitioners across the world. He continues to teach, conduct grading tests, give seminars, and offer assistance to those involved in taekwondo.

He was appointed as an Officer of the Order of Canada in 2023. He currently resides in Surrey, British Columbia.

== See also ==
- List of taekwondo grandmasters
