= List of people with the Korean family name Lee =

Lee (리 or 이) is a surname among ethnic Koreans, with approximately 15% of all Koreans sharing the name. The surname has other Romanized spelling variations such as Yi, Yee, Ri, Yie, Rhee, and Rhie.

== Politicians ==
- Lee Beom-seok (prime minister), Korean independence activist and 1st Prime Minister of South Korea
- Lee Beom-seok (foreign minister), South Korean diplomat, former Foreign Minister of South Korea and victim of the Rangoon bombing
- Lee Cheol-woo, South Korean politician, member of the National Assembly of South Korea
- Lee Eui-geun, South Korean politician
- Lee Hae-chan, 32nd Prime Minister of South Korea
- Lee Hoi-chang, 26th Prime Minister of South Korea
- Lee Hong-koo, 28th Prime minister of South Korea
- Lee Jae-Myung, incumbent President of South Korea
- Lee Jong-wook, South Korean physician, director-general of the World Health Organization
- Lee Myung-bak, 10th President of South Korea
- Lee Sang-don, South Korean legal scholar and conservative liberal political activist
- Syngman Rhee, 1st President of South Korea
- Lee Wan-koo, 39th prime minister of South Korea

== Arts and entertainment ==
=== Actors and actresses ===
- Lee Ae-jung, South Korean actress
- Lee Ah-hyun, South Korean actress
- Lee Beom-soo, South Korean actor
- Lee Bit-na, South Korean actress
- Lee Bo-hee, South Korean actress
- Lee Bo-young, South Korean actress
- Lee Bong-ryun, South Korean actress
- Lee Byung-hun, South Korean actor
- Lee Byung-joon, South Korean actor
- Lee Chae-eun, South Korean actress
- Lee Chae-kyung, South Korean actress
- Lee Chae-mi, South Korean actress
- Lee Chae-min, South Korean actor
- Lee Chae-young, South Korean actress
- Lee Chang-hoon, South Korean actor
- Lee Chang-wook, South Korean actor
- Lee Cho-hee, South Korean actress
- Lee Chun-hee, South Korean actor
- Lee Chung-ah, South Korean actress
- Lee Da-in, South Korean actress
- Lee Da-hae, Korean-Australian actress
- Lee Da-hee, South Korean actress and model
- Lee Da-yeon, South Korean actress
- Lee Do-yeop, South Korean actor and director
- Lee Dong-gun, South Korean actor and singer
- Lee Dong-hwi, South Korean actor and singer
- Lee Dong-wook, South Korean actor and model
- Lee Elijah, South Korean actress
- Lee Eun-ju, South Korean actress
- Lee Eun-saem, South Korean actress
- Lee Eung-kyung, South Korean actress
- Lee Ga-ryeong, South Korean actress and model
- Lee Ga-sub, South Korean actor
- Lee Geung-young, South Korean actor
- Lee Ha-na, South Korean actress
- Lee Ha-yool, South Korean actor
- Lee Hae-in, South Korean actress and former singer
- Lee Hak-joo, South Korean actor
- Lee Han-wi, South Korean actor
- Lee Hanee, South Korean actress, model, beauty pageant titleholder
- Lee Hang-na, South Korean actress
- Lee Hee-jin, South Korean actress and singer
- Lee Hee-joon, South Korean actor
- Lee Hwi-jae, South Korean TV presenter, comedian, actor, singer
- Lee Hyun-jin, South Korean actor
- Lee Hyun-wook, South Korean actor
- Lee Il-hwa, South Korean actress
- Lee In, South Korean actor
- Lee In-hye, South Korean actress
- Lee In-sung, South Korean actor
- Lee Jae-in, South Korean actress
- Lee Jae-wook, South Korean actor and model
- Lee Jae-yoon, South Korean-Canadian actor and model
- Lee Je-hoon, South Korean actor
- Lee Ji-hyun, South Korean actress
- Lee Jin-hee, South Korean actress
- Lee Jin-kwon, South Korean actor and singer
- Lee Jin-wook, South Korean actor
- Lee Jong-won, South Korean model and actor
- Lee Jong-suk, South Korean actor and model
- Lee Joo-bin, South Korean actress and model
- Lee Joo-myung, South Korean actress and model
- Lee Joo-sil, South Korean actress
- Lee Joo-woo, South Korean actress
- Lee Joo-young, South Korean actress
- Lee Joo-young, South Korean actress
- Lee Joon-gi, South Korean actor, singer, model
- Lee Joon-hyuk, South Korean actor
- Lee Joon-woo, South Korean actor and model
- Lee Joong-ok, South Korean actor
- Lee Jun-hyeok, South Korean actor
- Lee Jung-eun, South Korean actress
- Lee Jung-ha, South Korean actor
- Lee Jung-hoon (stage name Yoon So-ho), South Korean theatre and musical actor
- Lee Jung-jae, South Korean actor and filmmaker
- Lee Kang-min, South Korean actor
- Ki Hong Lee, Korean-American actor
- Lee Ki-woo, South Korean actor
- Lee Kwang-soo, South Korean actor and model
- Lee Kyu-hyung, South Korean actor
- Lee Mi-do, South Korean actress
- Lee Mi-sook, South Korean actress
- Lee Mi-yeon, South Korean actress
- Lee Min-ho, South Korean actor and model
- Lee Min-jae, South Korean actor
- Lee Min-jung, South Korean actress
- Lee Min-ki, South Korean actor, singer and model
- Lee Min-woo, South Korean actor
- Lee Min-young, South Korean actress
- Lee Moo-saeng, South Korean actor
- Lee Moon-sik, South Korean actor
- Lee Na-young, South Korean actress
- Lee Na-ra, South Korean actress
- Patricia Ja Lee, American actress
- Lee Pil-mo, South Korean actor
- Lee Re, South Korean actress
- Sang Heon Lee, South Korean actor
- Lee Sang-hee, South Korean actress
- Lee Sang-woo, South Korean actor
- Lee Sang-yeob, South Korean actor
- Lee Sang-yi, South Korean actor
- Lee Sang-yoon, South Korean actor
- Lee Se-hee, South Korean actress
- Lee Se-young, South Korean actress
- Lee Seo-jin, South Korean actor
- Lee Seo-won, South Korean former actor
- Lee Seol, South Korean actress
- Lee Seon-hee, South Korean actress
- Lee Seon-ho, South Korean actor
- Lee Seul-bi, South Korean actress
- Lee Seung-joon, South Korean actor
- Lee Seung-joon, South Korean actor
- Lee Seung-woo, South Korean actor
- Lee Si-eon, South Korean actor
- Lee Si-woo, South Korean actress and model
- Lee Si-woo, South Korean actor
- Lee Si-yeon, South Korean actress
- Lee Si-young, South Korean actress and former amateur boxer
- Lee So-hee (stage same Han So-hee), South Korean actress
- Lee So-young (stage same Esom), South Korean actress
- Lee Soo-hyuk, South Korean actor and model
- Lee Soo-kyung, South Korean actress
- Lee Soo-kyung, South Korean actress
- Lee Soo-min, South Korean actress
- Lee Soo-min, South Korean actress
- Lee Soon-jae, South Korean actor
- Stephanie Lee, Korean-American actress and model
- Lee Sun-kyun, South Korean actor
- Lee Sung-kyung, South Korean actress and model
- Lee Sung-min, South Korean actor
- Lee Sung-wook, South Korean actor
- Lee Tae-gon, South Korean actor
- Lee Tae-im, South Korean actress
- Lee Tae-ran, South Korean actress
- Lee Tae-ri, South Korean actor
- Lee Tae-sun, South Korean actor
- Lee Tae-sung, South Korean actor
- Lee Won-jong, South Korean actor
- Lee Won-jung, South Korean actor
- Lee Won-keun, South Korean actor
- Lee Yeon, South Korean actress
- Lee Yeon-hee, South Korean actress
- Lee Yi-kyung, South Korean actor
- Lee Yo-won, South Korean actress
- Lee Yoo-mi, South Korean actress
- Lee Yoo-young, South Korean actress
- Lee Yoon-ji, South Korean actress
- Lee Yoon-mi, South Korean actress and entrepreneur
- Lee Young-ae, South Korean actress
- Lee Young-ah, South Korean actress and model
- Lee Young-eun, South Korean actress
- Lee Young-jin, South Korean actress
- Lee Yu-bi, South Korean actress
- Lee Yu-ri, South Korean actress
- Lee Yul-eum, South Korean actress

=== Members of boy bands ===
- Lee Byung-yoon (stage name BewhY), South Korean rapper, member of hip hop band $exy $treet & Yello Music crew
- Lee Chan (stage name Dino), South Korean singer, member of boy band Seventeen
- Lee Chang-sub, South Korean singer, member of boy band BtoB
- Lee Dae-hwi, South Korean singer, member of boy band AB6IX
- Lee Donghae, South Korean singer, member of boy band Super Junior
- Lee Dong-hyuck (stage name Haechan), South Korean singer, member of boy band NCT
- Lee Dong-min (stage name Cha Eun-woo), South Korean singer and actor, member of boy band Astro
- Lee Eun-sang, South Korean singer, member of boy band Younite
- Felix Yongbok Lee, Australian rapper, member of boy band Stray Kids
- Lee Gi-kwang, South Korean singer, member of boy band Highlight
- Lee Hoe-taek (stage name Hui), South Korean singer, member of boy band Pentagon
- Lee Hong-bin, South Korean singer, member of boy band VIXX
- Lee Hong-gi, South Korean singer and actor, member of boy band FT Island
- Lee Ho-won (stage name Hoya), South Korean actor, former member of boy band Infinite
- Lee Ho-seok (stage name Wonho), South Korean singer, former member of boy band Monsta X
- Lee Joo-heon, (stage name Joohoney), South Korean rapper, member of boy band Monsta X
- Lee Hyuk-jae (stage name Eunhyuk), South Korean rapper, member of boy band Super Junior
- Lee Jae-jin, member of South Korean boy band Sechs Kies
- Lee Jae-won, South Korean singer, member of boy band H.O.T.
- Lee Je-no, South Korean singer and rapper, member of boy band NCT
- Lee Ji-hoon (stage name Woozi), South Korean singer, member of boy band Seventeen
- Lee Jin-hyuk, South Korean singer and actor, former member of boy band Up10tion
- Lee Jin-ki (stage name Onew), South Korean singer, member of boy band Shinee
- Lee Jong-hyun, South Korean singer and actor, former member of rock band CNBLUE
- Lee Jong-min (stage name Babylon), South Korean singer, member of boy band N-Train
- Lee Joon, South Korean singer, former member of boy band MBLAQ
- Lee Jun-ho, South Korean singer and actor, member of boy band 2PM
- Lee Jung-hwan (stage name Sandeul), South Korean singer, member of boy band B1A4
- Lee Jung-shin, South Korean musician, member of rock band CNBLUE
- Lee Kyung-min, South Korean singer, member of rock band TWS
- Leo Lee, Australian singer-songwriter, member of boy band Alpha Drive One
- Lee Min-ho (stage name Lee Know), South Korean singer, member of boy band Stray Kids
- Lee Min-hyuk, South Korean rapper, member of boy band BtoB
- Lee Min-hyuk (stage name B-Bomb), South Korean singer and dancer, member of boy band Block B
- Lee Min-hyuk, South Korean singer, member of boy band Monsta X
- Mark Lee, Canadian rapper and singer, former member of boy band NCT
- Lee Min-woo, South Korean entertainer, member of boy band Shinhwa
- Lee Seok-min (stage name DK), South Korean singer, member of boy band Seventeen
- Lee Seung-hoon, South Korean rapper, member of boy band Winner
- Lee Seung-hyub, South Korean rapper, singer, actor, member of rock band N.Flying
- Lee Sun-ho (stage name Andy), South Korean singer, member of boy band Shinhwa
- Lee Sung-min, South Korean singer, member of boy band Super Junior
- Lee Sung-jong, South Korean singer, member of boy band Infinite
- Lee Sung-yeol, South Korean singer, member of boy band Infinite
- Lee Tae-il, South Korean singer, member of boy band Block B
- Lee Tae-min, South Korean singer, member of boy band Shinee
- Lee Tae-yong, South Korean rapper, member of boy band NCT
- Lee Hee-seung (stage name Heeseung or Evan), South Korean singer, former member of boy band Enhypen

=== Members of girl groups ===
- Lee Bo-ram, South Korean singer, former member of girl group SeeYa
- Lee Chae-rin (stage name CL), South Korean singer and rapper, former member of girl group 2NE1
- Lee Chae-ryeong, South Korean singer, member of girl group Itzy
- Lee Chae-yeon, South Korean singer, former member of girl group Iz*One
- Lee Da-bin (stage name Yeonwoo), South Korean singer and actress, former member of girl group Momoland
- Lee Geu-roo (stage name Nancy), Korean-American singer, former member of girl group Momoland
- Lee Hwa-kyum (stage name Yooyoung), South Korean actress and singer, former member of girl group Hello Venus
- Lee Hye-in, South Korean singer, member of girl group NewJeans
- Lee Hye-ri, South Korean actress and singer, member of girl group Girl's Day
- Lee Hyori, South Korean singer, member of girl group Fin.K.L
- Lee Jisoo, South Korean singer and songwriter, member of girl group Hana
- Lee Ji-yeon (stage name Lina), South Korean musical actress and singer, member of girl group The Grace
- Lee Joo-won (stage name JooE), South Korean rapper, former member of girl group Momoland
- Lee Joo-yeon, South Korean actress and singer, former member of girl group After School
- Lee Qri (born Lee Ji-hyun), South Korean singer and actress, member of girl group T-ara
- Lee Luda, South Korean singer and actress, member of girl group Cosmic Girls
- Lee Mi-joo, South Korean singer, member of girl group Lovelyz
- Lee Min-young (stage name Min), South Korean singer, former member of girl group Miss A
- Lee Na-eun, South Korean actress and singer, former member of girl group April
- Lee Sunmi, South Korean singer, former member of girl group Wonder Girls
- Susan Soonkyu Lee (stage name Sunny), Korean-American singer, member of girl group Girls' Generation
- Lee Yeji (stage name Yezi), South Korean rapper, former member of girl group Fiestar

=== Musical performers ===
- Amy Lee (stage name Ailee), Korean-American singer
- Lee Chae-yeon, South Korean singer
- Lee Chan-hyuk, South Korean singer-songwriter, member of sibling duo AKMU
- Lee Chang-min, South Korean singer
- Chinsea Linda Lee (stage name Shenseea), Jamaican singer
- Lee Eun-young (stage name Ben), South Korean singer
- Lee Hae-in, South Korean singer, actress, creative director
- Lee Hae-ri, South Korean singer, member of pop ballad duo Davichi
- Lee Hi, South Korean singer and songwriter
- Lee Hyun, (also known as Midnatt), South Korean singer
- Lee Ji-eun (stage name IU), South Korean singer-songwriter and actress
- Lee Ji-hye, South Korean singer and actress, former member of pop group Sharp
- Lee Jung-hyun, South Korean singer and actress
- JinJoo Lee, Korean-American musician, guitarist of pop rock band DNCE
- Lee Moon-sae, South Korean singer
- Lee Mu-jin, South Korean singer
- Lee Seong-hwa (stage name Gray), South Korean rapper, singer, record producer
- Lee Seung-chul, South Korean singer
- Lee Seung-gi, South Korean singer
- Lee Seung-hwan, South Korean singer
- Lee Soo-young, South Korean ballad singer
- Lee Suhyun, South Korean singer-songwriter, member of sibling duo AKMU
- Lee Sun-hee, South Korean singer
- Lee Yeong-sin (stage name Punchnello), South Korean rapper
- Lee Young-ji, South Korean rapper

=== Other ===
- Catherine Yi (1783–1839), Korean saint
- Cecilia Hae-Jin Lee, Korean-American writer, artist, photographer and chef
- Lee Aerisu, South Korean singer, and actress
- Lee Chang-dong, South Korean film director, screenwriter, and novelist
- Edeline Lee, Canadian British fashion designer
- Lee Eun-jae (better known as Jaejae), South Korean producer, host, and television personality
- EunWon Lee, South Korean ballet dancer
- Lee Ho-baek, South Korean picture book author
- Lee Hye-gyeong, South Korean writer
- Lee Hyeonggi, South Korean modern poet
- Lee Hwa-ja, South Korean singer
- Yi In-seong, South Korean modern novelist
- Lee Kang-baek, South Korean playwright
- Lee Ki-ho, South Korean writer
- Li Ki Sun Bejčková, Korean and Czech textile artist
- Yi Kŭmch'ŏl, North Korean writer
- Leejung Lee, South Korean choreographer and dancer
- Miseon Lee, painter based in Ireland
- Lee Mun-ku, South Korean novelist
- Lee O-young, South Korean critic and novelist
- Lee Pa-ni, South Korean model and actress
- Lee Sa-bi, South Korean model and actress
- Lee Sung Jin, Korean-American screenwriter
- Lee Saek, 14th century philosopher and poet
- Yi Sang, 20th century writer
- Soo Yeon Lee, South Korean table tennis player and model
- Sueyeun Juliette Lee, Korean American video artist and poet
- Lee Sung-Hi, South Korean model and actress
- Lee Woo-jung, South Korean television screenwriter
- Lee Young-ja, South Korean comedian and television presenter
- Yi Yuk-Sa, Korean independence activist and poet

== Sports ==
=== Badminton ===
- Lee Dong-soo, South Korean badminton player
- Lee Hyo-jung (badminton), South Korean badminton player
- Lee Hyun-il, South Korean badminton player
- Lee Joo-hyun, South Korean badminton player
- Lee Kyung-won, South Korean badminton player
- Lee Yong-dae, South Korean badminton player
- Lee Young-suk, South Korean badminton player

=== Football ===
- Lee Bum-young, South Korean goalkeeper
- Lee Chung-yong, South Korean footballer
- Lee Chun-soo, South Korean footballer
- Lee Dong-gook, South Korean footballer
- Lee Eul-yong, South Korean football coach
- Lee Jae-gun, South Korean footballer
- Lee Jae-sung (footballer, born 1992), South Korean footballer
- Lee Jung-soo, South Korean footballer
- Lee Kang-in, South Korean footballer
- Lee Keun-ho, South Korean footballer
- Lee Seung-woo, South Korean footballer
- Lee Woon-jae, South Korean goalkeeper
- Lee Yong (footballer, born 1986), South Korean footballer
- Lee Young-pyo, South Korean footballer

=== Taekwondo ===
- Won Kuk Lee, Korean-American Chung Do Kwan Founder of Tangsoodo/Taekwondo
- Haeng Ung Lee, Korean-American Chung Do Kwan member Founder of MTA and the ATA SongAhm Taekwondo
- Dae Sung Lee, Korean-American Taekwondo master
- Rhee Chong Chul, South Korean Taekwondo master
- Jhoon Rhee, South Korean Taekwondo master
- Rhee Ki-ha, South Korean Taekwondo master

=== Volleyball ===
- Lee Da-yeong, South Korean volleyball player
- Lee Jae-yeong, South Korean volleyball player
- Lee So-young (volleyball), South Korean volleyball player

=== Other ===
- Lee Ailesa, South Korean former table tennis player
- Lee Bum-ho, South Korean former baseball player
- Lee Bong-ju, South Korean marathoner
- Lee Chang-ho, South Korean professional Go player
- Rhee Dae-eun, South Korean baseball player
- Lee Dae-ho, South Korean baseball player
- Lee Eun-ju, South Korean artistic gymnast
- Lee Eun-jung, South Korean long-distance runner
- Lee Geon-u (born 2000), South Korean bobsledder
- Lee Hui-sol, South Korean Olympic weightlifter
- Lee Hyeon-chul, South Korean wheelchair curler
- Lee Hyung-taik, South Korean former tennis player
- Lee Jae-dong, South Korean professional StarCraft player
- Lee Kyoung-hoon, South Korean professional golfer
- Meena Lee, South Korean professional golfer
- Lee Mi-ok, South Korean retired long-distance runner
- Lee Min-hyeong (better known as Gumayusi), South Korean professional League of Legends player and distant nephew of Faker
- Lee Na-hyun, South Korean speed skater
- Lee Sang-hyuk (better known as Faker), South Korean professional League of Legends player
- Sarah Lee, South Korean professional golfer
- Lee Sedol, South Korean professional Go player
- Lee Seon-hwa, South Korean professional golfer
- Lee Seung-min, South Korean taekwondo coach
- Lee Seung-yuop, South Korean retired baseball player
- Lee Sung-hyun, South Korean kickboxer
- Lee Sung-jin, South Korean recursive archer
- Lee Yong-suk, South Korean wheelchair curler
- Lee Young-ho (better known as Flash), South Korean professional StarCraft player
- Lee Yun-yeol, South Korean entrepreneur, video game designer, and former professional gamer
- Lee Sung-ju, North Korean human rights advocate and author
- Ri Yong-gum, North Korean skier

== Other ==
- Lee Bong-chang, Korean independence activist
- Lee Choon-jae, South Korean serial killer
- Edward Lee, Korean American celebrity chef, author, restaurateur
- Lee Han-lim (general) (1921–2012), South Korean general
- Helen Shores Lee, American jurist and lawyer
- Lee Joon-ho, South Korean businessman, chairman of NHN Corporation
- Jung-min Lee, Korean American oncologist
- Lee Kun-hee, South Korean business magnate, former chairman of Samsung Group
- Lee Kyung-hae, South Korean farmer and political activist
- Lee Sung-ju, North Korean human rights advocate and author
- Lee Sang-yun, South Korean professor
- Lee Soo-man, South Korean businessman, founder of S.M. Entertainment
- Lee So-sun, South Korean labor activist
- Lee Tai-young, South Korea's first female lawyer, founder of the first South Korean legal aid centre
- Thai Lee, Korean American billionaire businesswoman, founder of SHI International Corp
- Michelle Rhee, American educator
- Simon Hang-bock Rhee, South Korean Scout
- Ri Chun-hee, North Korean news presenter
- Ri In-mo, pro-North Korea activist imprisoned in South Korea
- Ri Sol-ju, current First Lady of North Korea
- Yi Cheong, Korean-Japanese noble, member of the former Imperial Family of Korea
- Yi Ŏkki, 16th century naval commander
- Yi Kae, 15th century government official and scholar of the Joseon Dynasty
- Yi Hwang, 16th century Confucian scholar
- Yi I, 16th century Confucian scholar
- Yi Ik, 18th century Neo Confucian scholar
- Yi Chongmu, 15th century Korean general
- Yi Kang, Korean royalty
- Yi Ku, Korean royalty
- Yi So-yeon, South Korean astronaut and biotechnologist, first Korean to fly in space
- Yi Sun-sin, 16th century admiral

== See also ==
- Lee (disambiguation)
