= Park Chan-ju =

Spouse of Prince Yi U of Korea (1914–1995)

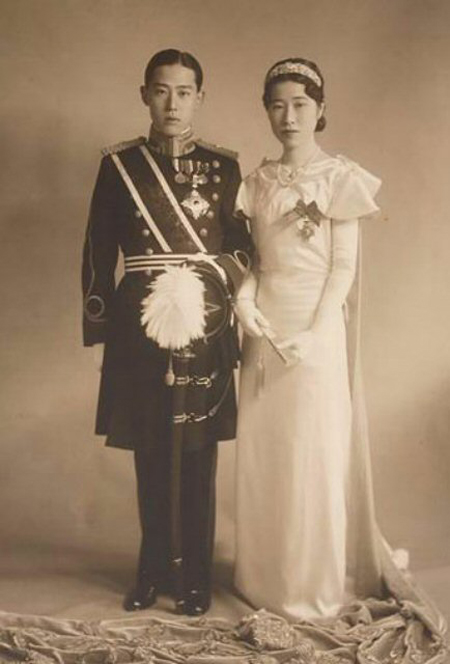
Yi U and Park Chan-ju in 1935

Park Chan-ju (Korean: 박찬주; Hanja: 朴贊珠; 11 December 1914 – 13 July 1995), was the spouse of Prince Yi U of Korea.

She was a granddaughter of Marquis Park Yeong-hyo, who was a son-in-law of King Cheoljong of Joseon as a husband of Princess Yeonghye of Korea. They had two children, Yi Chung and Yi Jong.

== Biography ==
Park Chan-ju was born into the Bannam Park clan on 11 December 1914 in Keijō (Seoul), Keiki-dō, Korea, Empire of Japan to Park Il-seo and his wife, Park Won-hui as the eldest daughter within their youngest five sons and youngest daughter. In March 1932, Chan-ju graduated from Kyungsung Girls' High School (now known today as Gyeonggi Girls' High School), and went to Japan to study in Tokyo Women's Learning Center.

Prince Uihwa did not want Yi U, his second son, to marry a Japanese noblewoman and insisted that he marry a Korean noblewoman unlike his brother, Prince Yi Geon. Since Park Yeong-hyo was close friends with Prince Uihwa, both wanted to find a way to reject Yi U's marriage to a Japanese bride. Park had spoken about setting up his eldest granddaughter with Prince Uihwa's second eldest son. Yi U's adoptive mother, Lady Kim of the Gwangsan Kim clan, disliked Chan-ju because the prince had attempted to kill his adoptive father, Yi Jun-yong (the nephew of Emperor Gojong and Empress Myeongseong) who tried to assassinate and rebel towards Kim Hak-woo (김학우; 金鶴羽) of the Legal Affairs Association, with charges in 1895 while her grandfather served as Minister of Interior.

The prince had notified Minister Han Chang-soo (한창수; 韓昌洙) to establish the marriage when he sent an engagement ring to Chan-ju, but Lee Wang-jik (이왕직), a Minister who was in charge of the affairs of the royal family, had protested against the marriage as it was done without the Emperor's acknowledge and tried to pressure the prince to marry within the Japanese royal family instead.

Yi U was adamant in marrying a Korean, and with Park Yeong-hyo's influence against Japanese politics, the Japanese royal court and Lee Wang-jik acknowledged the Yi U's and Park Chan-ju's marriage. Chan-ju's grandfather had pretended that the marriage with a Japanese noblewoman was withdrawn, and had gone to Tokyo to make use of his political, aristocratic, and personal connections to eventually have the acknowledgement of the engagement announced by the Japanese Imperial Palace on 11 July 1934. On 17 April 1935, Emperor Showa made a decree to acknowledge the marriage in which the wedding ceremony of the couple was held in Tokyo on 3 May 1935. When the married couple returned to Keijō, they visited the Jongmyo Shrine and Neungwon, and held a ceremony at the Joseon Hotel and Unhyeongung Palace. Their eldest son was born on 23 April 1936 and their second son was on 9 November 1940 in separate residences in Tokyo.

In 1938, the building they lived in was donated to the female activist and educator Hwang Shin-deok (황신덕) to help establish the Kyungsung Family Ryosuk (now known as Joongang Girls' High School). On 25 August 1945, Park Chan-ju had lost Yi U to the atomic bombing of Hiroshima and went to live at Unhyeongung Palace with her two sons. In April 1950, she became the first chairman of Chugye University of Arts, Joongang Girls' High School, and Chugye Elementary School.

In 1992, Unhyeongung Palace was sold to Seoul, and after spending her last years at her home in Bukahyeon-dong, Seodaemun, Seoul, she died from an illness on 13 July 1995. She is buried with her husband Yi U at the gravesite of Heungseon Daewongun in Changhyeon, Hwado-eub, Namyang, Gyeonggi Province.

== Family ==
- Father
  - Park Il-seo (박일서; 朴日緖; 1897–1931)
- Mother
  - Park Won-hui (박원희; 朴元熙; 1900–1969)
- Siblings
  - Younger brother - Park Chan-byeom (박찬범; 朴贊汎; 17 August 1917 – 23 November 1986); succeeded his father in becoming Marquis
  - Younger brother - Park Chan-ik (박찬익; 朴贊益; 1920 – 2003)
  - Younger brother - Park Chan-woo (박찬우; 朴贊友; 1923–?); died prematurely
  - Younger sister - Park Chan-ok (박찬옥; 朴贊玉)
  - Younger brother - Park Chan-eung (박찬웅; 朴贊雄; 1926–1950)
  - Younger brother - Park Chan-yong (박찬용; 朴贊用; 1927–1945)
- Husband
  - Prince Yi U (이우; 李鍝; 15 August 1912 – 7 July 1945)
    - Father-in-law - Yi Kang, King Uichin (의친왕 이강; 30 March 1877 – 16 August 1955)
    - Mother-in-law - Lady Kim Heung-in of the Suindang Hall (수인당 김흥인)
      - Legal mother-in-law - Kim Su-deok, Queen Uichin (김수덕 의친왕비; 22 December 1880 – 14 January 1964)
- Issue
  - Son - Yi Cheong (이청; 李淸; 23 April 1936)
  - Son - Yi Jong (이종; 李淙; 9 November 1940 – 25 December 1966)
