= Lee Jun-ho (disambiguation) =

Lee Jun-ho (born 1990) is a South Korean singer and actor.

Lee Jun-ho (Korean: 이준호) may also refer to:

- Lee Joon-ho (businessman) (born 1964), South Korean businessman
- Lee Joon-ho (speed skater) (born 1965), South Korean short track speed skater
- Lee Jun-ho (footballer) (born 1989), South Korean footballer
- Lee Jun-ho (gymnast) (born 1995), South Korean artistic gymnast

== See also ==
- Lee Jung-hoo (born 1998), South Korean baseball player
