= Yi U =

Prince of Korea (1912–1945)

- Prince of Korea; Head of Unhyeon Palace
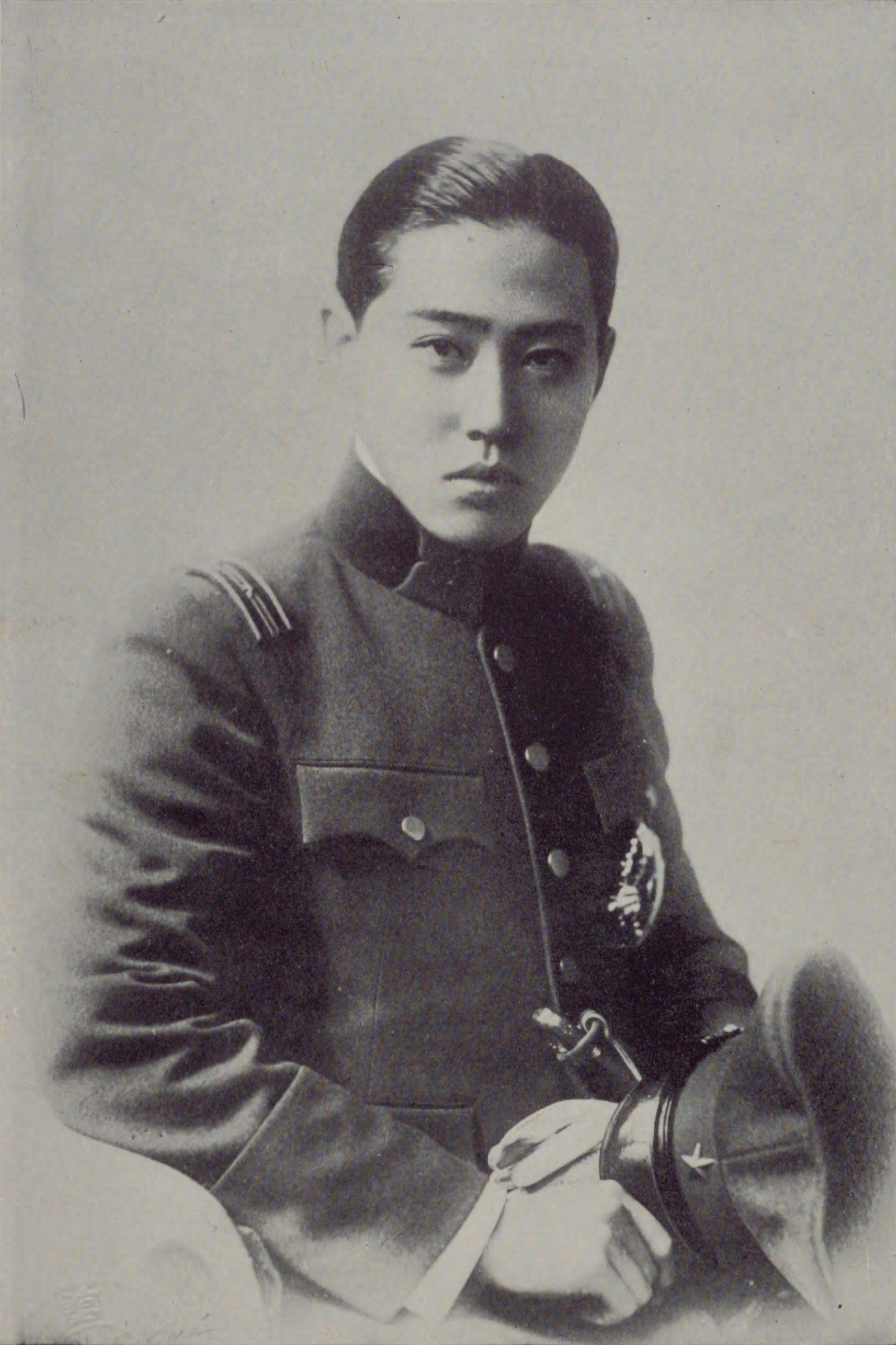
- Prince Yi when serving in the Japanese Army

Duke of Unhyeongung
- Reign: 1917–1945
- Predecessor: Yi Jun-yong
- Successor: Yi Cheong
- Born: 15 November 1912; Keijō, Keiki-dō, Korea, Empire of Japan (today Seoul, South Korea)
- Died: 7 August 1945 (aged 32); Ninoshima, Hiroshima Prefecture, Empire of Japan
- Burial: 15 August 1945; Heungwon
- Spouse: Lady Park Chan-ju (m. 1935)
- Issue: Yi Cheong; Yi Jong
- Father: Prince Imperial Ui
- Mother: Lady Suin, concubine
- Military career
- Allegiance: Japan
- Branch: Imperial Japanese Army
- Service years: 1933–1945
- Rank: Colonel (posthumous)
- Units: Information officer, China; GSO at Hiroshima
- Conflicts: Second Sino-Japanese War; Second World War; Home Front; Atomic bombing of Hiroshima †
- Awards: Order of the Chrysanthemum; Showa Enthronement Medal (1928); Tokyo Earthquake Rehabilitation Medal (1930); Japanese Red Cross Order of Merit; China Incident Medal (1937)

- Yi U
- Hangul: 이우
- Hanja: 李鍝
- RR: I U
- MR: I U

Colonel Prince Yi U (Korean: 이우; 15 November 1912 – 7 August 1945) was a member of the imperial family of Korea as a prince, the 4th head of Unhyeon Palace, and a lieutenant colonel in the Imperial Japanese Army during World War II. He was killed during the atomic bombing of Hiroshima.

== Biography ==
He was born the second son of Prince Kang, the fifth son of Emperor Gojong.

At the age of five, he was adopted to be the heir of the deceased Prince Yeongseon, the 3rd head of Unhyeon Palace and the only son of the elder brother of Emperor Gojong, Prince Hui. He was taken to Japan shortly afterwards to attend the Gakushūin, the Peers School, where other Korean and Japanese Imperial princes and princesses received their education from the elementary, all the way to high school programming.

However, unlike his elder brother, Prince Geon, he maintained his identity as a Korean, despite his Japanese education. This made him the favorite son of his father, Prince Kang, who himself attempted to escape from Korea to join the exiled Korean government. He overcame all attempts by the Japanese to marry him off to a minor Japanese noble, and married Lady Park Chan-ju of the Bannam Park clan, a granddaughter of Marquis Pak Yung-hio who was a husband of Princess Yŏnghye of Korea. They had two children, Yi Cheong and Yi Jong.

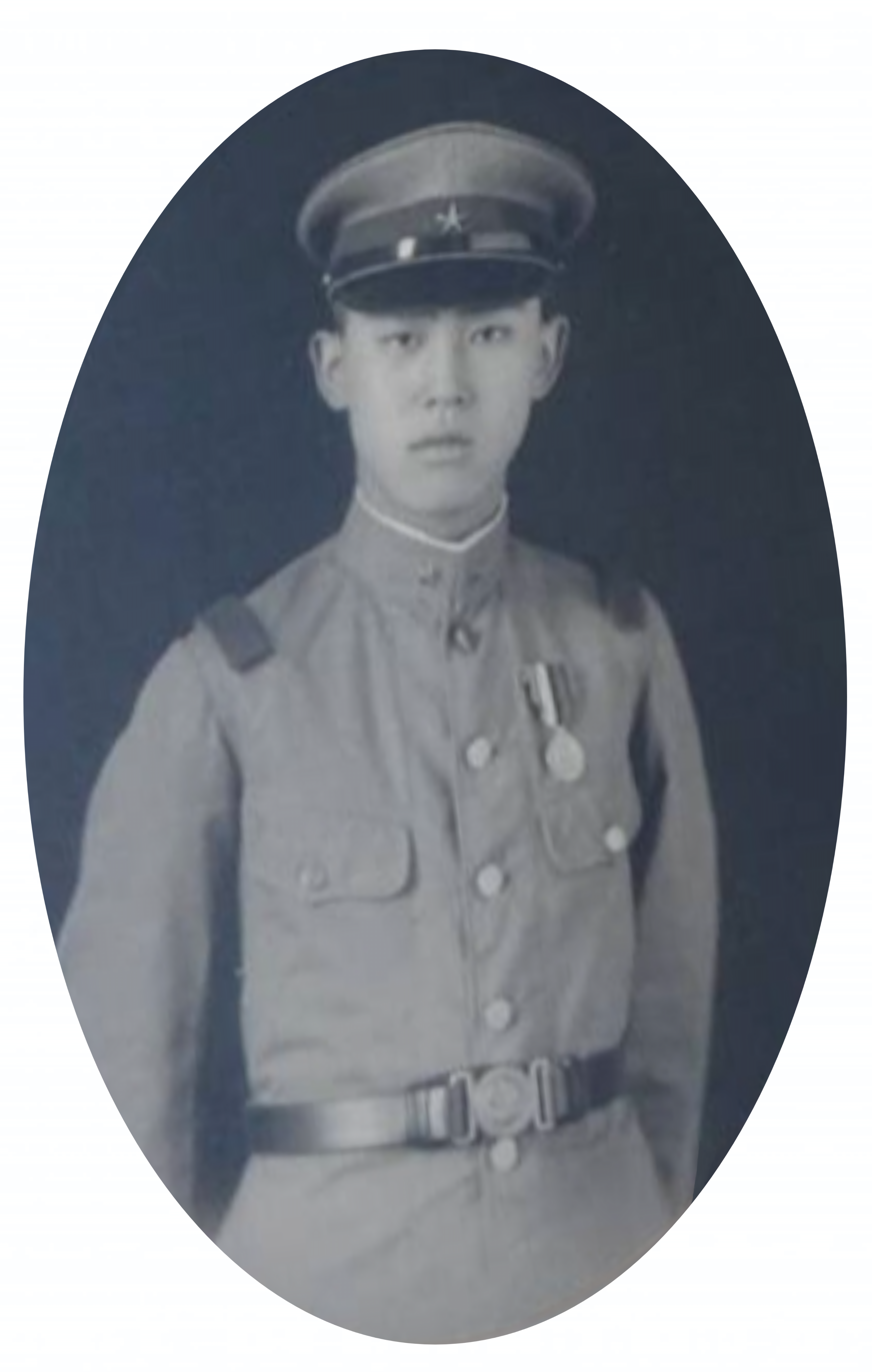
Prince Yi U in 1933

Prince Yi served in the Japanese Army and was stationed in China. Commissioned a second lieutenant on 25 October 1933, he was promoted to lieutenant on 25 October 1935, to captain on 1 March 1938, to major on 15 October 1941 and to lieutenant colonel on 10 June 1945.

== Death ==
Prince U was transferred to Hiroshima in 1945, and on 6 August 1945, he was mortally injured by the atomic bomb blast on the way to his office, and died later that day at a medical aid station. He was posthumously promoted to the rank of colonel. On August 8, Adjutant Lieutenant Colonel Yoshinari Hiroshi (吉成 弘) committed suicide on account of not being able to save Prince Yi. Thereafter his body was moved to Korea and was buried in Heungwon on 15 August 1945, the day the war ended.

== Popular culture ==
- Portrayed by Go Soo in the 2016 film The Last Princess.

== See also ==
- Korea under Japanese rule
