= Kang Seok-yeon =

Korean singer and actress (1914–2001)

Kang Seok-yeon 강석연
- Born: Kang Seok-yeon; September 1, 1914; Jeju Island, Korea, Empire of Japan
- Died: February 6, 2001 (aged 86) Seoul, South Korea
- Education: Keijō Imperial University
- Genres: Jazz; Trot; Folk
- Occupations: Singer; actress
- Years active: 1920–1939
- Labels: Columbia Records; Victor Records
- Spouse: Bang Tae-young (m. 1936–1950)
- Children: 4

Kang Seok-yeon (Korean: 강석연; Hanja: 姜石燕; 1914 – 2001) was a pioneering Korean singer and actress who became one of the most iconic figures of the Japanese colonial period. Often cited as the quintessential "Modern Girl" of the 1920s and 1930s, she was a prolific recording artist for major labels such as Columbia and Victor Records and held the record for the most frequent radio appearances by a female singer in Gyeongseong Broadcasting Station. She was known as the "Lindbergh of the East" in the 1930s. Her 1931 debut, "Wandering Song," became a foundational track for the early Korean pop and trot genres.

== Early life and education ==
Kang was born in 1914 on Jeju Island and relocated to Seoul with her family at the age of four. Following the death of her father when she was 11, her family faced significant financial hardship. She attended the preparatory course at the Joseon Women's Academy, operated by the Joseon Women's Youth Association. Later she graduated from Keijō Imperial University.

She belonged to a prominent "family of entertainers"; her older siblings, Kang Seok-je and Kang Seok-woo, were both active actors in the Toweolhwe (Tohwalhoe) theater troupe. This familial background facilitated her early entry into the arts, including dance studies at Bae Gu-ja's Dance Research Institute in 1929.

== Career ==
=== Theater and "Intermission Singing" ===
In late 1929, Kang joined Toweolhwe as an actress. While she was respected for her theatrical performances, she gained unprecedented fame as an "intermission singer," performing musical numbers during breaks between plays. Though she was a talented actress known for her "cheerful and colorful style," she gained unique fame as an "intermission singer". Performing during the breaks between plays, her vocal talent began to overshadow her acting, leading critics to label her a "genius in singing rather than acting". Her vocal talent was so pronounced that contemporary critics labeled her a "genius in singing rather than acting". This popularity led to her being heavily scouted by the burgeoning record industry.

=== Recording Stardom (1931–1933) ===
Kang rose to national stardom in February 1931 with her debut record for Columbia Records, featuring the tracks "Wandering Song" (유랑의 노래) and "Paulownia Tree". Kang's song "Wandering Song" became an anthem for colonial youth, its lyrics of despair and sorrow resonating with the national sentiment of the time.

Over a nine-year career, she produced approximately 162 works, covering genres from pop and folk to "New Folk Songs" (Shin-minyo) and comedic sketches. In 1933, she moved to Victor Records, where she was ranked as the top scouting priority alongside her close friend and professional rival, Lee Aerisu.

=== The 1932 Japan Trip ===
In October 1932, at the peak of her fame, Kang traveled to Tokyo to record at Victor's headquarters. During this prestigious trip, she performed on the outdoor stage at Hibiya Park and recorded the historic duet "The Flower of Life" (생명의 꽃) with Lee Aerisu a rare collaboration between the era's two biggest stars. Despite media attempts to frame them as arch-rivals, the duet served as a testament to their personal friendship and professional solidarity.

=== Radio and Broadcasting ===
Kang was a dominant force on the Gyeongseong Broadcasting Station (JODK). From 1933 to 1937, she appeared on the Korean-language "Second Broadcast" 25 times—averaging one appearance every two months. Her background in theater also made her a frequent lead in early radio dramas.

=== The "Modern Girl" Iconography ===
Kang was the public face of the "Modern Girl" movement, characterized by Western fashion, bobbed hair, and a defiant, confident public persona. In 1936, she opened Café Mona Lisa in Honmachi (modern-day Myeong-dong). She envisioned the café as a cultural salon and "meeting place for poets and scholars," further cementing her status as an intellectual and cultural tastemaker.

=== Retirement (1939) ===
In 1936, at the height of her popularity, Kang married Bang Tae-young, a prominent journalist and bureaucrat. Following the union, she began a gradual withdrawal from the entertainment industry to focus on her domestic life. She effectively retired from public performance and radio by 1937, though she returned to the studio one final time in 1939 to record the insert song for the tragedy Wandering Siblings with Columbia Records.

== Personal life ==
In early 1933, Kang was involved in a widely publicized "suicide commotion" involving medication, which occurred just days before a similar attempt by Lee Aerisu. Despite the media framing them as arch-rivals, the two remained close personal friends. These events highlighted the intense psychological pressure faced by the era's first generation of celebrities.

In 1936, she married Bang Tae-young, a bureaucrat and journalist. Following the marriage, she gradually withdrew from entertainment to focus on her family and had four sons.

== Later years and death ==
Following the outbreak of the Korean War, Kang's life took a tragic turn when her husband was abducted to North Korea. To support her children as a single mother, she opened a beauty salon and deliberately chose to live in total anonymity regarding her past stardom. She reportedly never revealed her career as a 1930s "Top Star" to her children, seeking to provide them with a normal upbringing away from her former fame. She lived an ordinary life until her death at age 86 in 2001 at Seoul and was laid to rest in Paju, Gyeonggi Province.

== Cultural impact ==
Kang was a quintessential "Modern Girl" (Modŏn-gŏl), a term that came to symbolize a bold break from traditional Korean norms during the colonial 1920s and 1930s. She was a leader in the new urban culture, frequenting modern theaters, department stores, and cafés. Her operation of the Mona Lisa café was a high-profile example of this lifestyle, serving as a hub for artists and "Modern Boys".

She was often seen as an "icon of performance," walking the streets of Gyeongseong with a confidence that reporters described as "puffed out" and defiant of traditional passive feminine roles.

== Legacy ==
Kang produced approximately 162 works over a nine-year recording career. In 2014, the historical music group "Yujeongcheonri" released a definitive collection of 37 of her songs to restore her place in Korean music history.

Her legacy was revitalized in 2014 when the music group Yujeongcheonri released Kang's Representative Song Collection, a CD containing 37 of her most significant recordings. Her second son, Bang Yeol, became a prominent figure in South Korea sports as a national basketball player and coach.

== See also ==
- Music of South Korea
- Trot (music)
- Japanese colonial period
- Kaesong
