= Yi Cheong =

Korean academic (born 1936)

Duke Yi 4th generation of Yi Hui line
- Reign: 1945–1947
- Predecessor: Yi U
- Successor: None
- Born: 23 April 1936 (age 90); Tokyo Villa of Duke Yi U, Tokiwamatsuchō, Shibuya, Tokyo City, Empire of Japan
- Spouse: Kim Chae-yeong (m. 1971)
- House: House of Yi
- Father: Yi U
- Mother: Park Chan-ju

- Yi Cheong
- Hangul: 이청
- Hanja: 李淸
- RR: I Cheong
- MR: I Ch'ŏng

Yi Cheong (born 23 April 1936) is a member of the former Imperial Family of Korea and was a Korean-Japanese noble during Korea under Japanese rule in 1945–1947. He is a great-great-grandson of Heungseon Daewongun and the eldest son of Yi U and Park Chan-ju.

The Empire of Japan was defeated during the World War II in 1945; as the result, a new Japanese constitution was revised, in which Japanese nobility status was invalid since 1947, making Yi Cheong lost his nobility titles. He later graduated from Marquette University in the United States. In 2006, based on multiple historical sources including the Journal of the Royal Secretariat, Yi Cheong published a 4-volume compilation about the history of his ancestor, Heungseon Daewongun.

== Biography ==
Born on April 23, 1936, 16:38 in the Tokyo residence from Shibuya, Tokyo City of the Empire of Japan, he is the eldest son of Duke Yi U and Duchess Park Chan-ju; he was later named, on April 29 of the same year, "Ri Sei" (リ セイ) in Japanese and "Yi Cheong" (이청) in Korean. Yi U was the second son of Prince Yi Kang and the heir to Yi Jun-yong, and Park Chan-ju was a granddaughter of Marquis Pak Yung-hio, the son-in-law of King Cheoljong of Joseon. In 1942, as a member of noble family, Yi Cheong enrolled in Gakushuin; as of 1944, he returned to Keijō (now Seoul of Korea) and resided in his ancestral home, Unhyeongung. On August 7, 1945, Yi Cheong's father, Yi U, was killed by the atomic bomb Little Boy during his way to work in Hiroshima; as his heir, Yi Cheong succeeded his title as Duke Yi Cheong (李淸公) three days later.

After the World War II, a series of nobility titles within Japan were abolished, including kazoku and Korean nobles, Yi Cheong lost his title in 1947 became a commoner ever since; around the same time, the Republic of Korea was founded. A law was legislated regarding the property of the former Imperial family and many of which was confiscated, but after the negotiation by Park Chan-ju, Yi Cheong and his family were allowed to own Unhyeongung, which was returned in 1948, based on the fact that the origin of Unhyeongung was the private residence of Heungseon Daewongun and his family. Under their procession, nevertheless, the scale of current Unhyeongung is much smaller than it used to be, because parts of the land were sold in decades, for various reasons including debt settlement and road expansion. During the tenure of President Syngman Rhee in 1950s, since Yi Cheong and Rhee are both from the Jeonju Yi clan and the latter was childless, Rhee asked to adopt Yi Cheong after they met, but this proposal was refused by the family of Unhyeongung. In 1954, Yi Cheong went to Kyunggi High School and later, in 1960, he acquired the decree from the Department of Civil Engineering of Marquette University, United States. On December 25, 1966, Yi Cheong's younger brother, Yi Jong, died in a traffic accident during his study career in the United States, making Yi Cheong the only remaining issue of his family.

Since his graduation, Yi Cheong worked as an engineer in H.T. Spoden & Associates in 1960-64 and Boss H. Bryan, a united design office, in 1965-69; both were in Tennessee. He also became a postgraduate in DePaul University for a year in 1970. As of 1974, he became the vice president of Dongwon Engineering Consultant Ltd. and he returned to Korea in 1991. In 1993, due to inability to maintain Unhyeongung, Yi Cheong and his mother decided to sell the palace to the municipal government of Seoul, and he moved to Bugahyeon-dong in Seodaemun District and later to Pyeongchang-dong. As of 1994, he was hired as a lecturer in Yonsei University as well as a visiting professor in the College of Business Administration of University of Seoul since 1998; he was a former member of the Korean Society of Civil Engineers (KSCE) and Architectural Institute of Korea.

In 2007, the Investigative Commission on Pro-Japanese Collaborators' Property (ICJCP), a Korean government institute existed in 2006-10, announced that Prince Imperial Heung and his son, Yi Jun-yong (both were Yi Cheong's adoptive ancestors), were both chinilpa, as they were the Korean Imperial representatives and they agreed to sign the Japan–Korea Treaty of 1910. As a response, Yi Cheong appealed a judicial case, asking to undo the decision and claiming that the act was unconstitutional; the court eventually announced that the plaintiff lost the case.

After selling Unhyeongung, Yi Cheong still continues to donate relics and lands from his family. In 2007, he gave more than 8,000 artifacts to the Seoul Museum of History; in 2018, the cemetery of Heungseon Daewongun, covered an area of 2,555 square metres, and its surrounding lands of 129,935 square metres were given to Gyeonggi Province; they would cost 5.2 billion South Korean won (approximately $4.33 million) if the land were to be sold. For appreciation, the municipal government gave him a plaque as recognition.

== Family ==
- Great-great-grandfather: Heungseon Daewongun (1820-1898)
- Great-great-grandmother: Grand Internal Princess Consort Sunmok (1818-1898), the eldest daughter of Min Chigu from the Yeoheung Min clan.
  - Great-grandfather (adoptive): Yi Jae-myeon, Prince Imperial Heung (1845-1912), the heir to Heungseon Daewongun; he became the Duke Yi Hui (李熹公) in 1910.
  - Great-grandmother (adoptive): Lady Hong of Pungsan (1844-1887), daughter of Hong Byeong-ju and the first wife of Yi Jae-myeon.
  - Great-grandmother (adoptive): Lady Yi of Yeoju, later the Princess Imperial Heung (1883-1978); her father was Yi Yingu and she was the second wife of Yi Jae-myeon. She became the Duchess Consort of Yi Hui (李熹公妃李氏) in 1910.
    - Grandfather (adoptive): Yi Jun-yong (Prince Yeongseon, 1870-1917), heir to Duke Yi Hui and succeeded the title in 1912 as Duke Yi Jun (李埈公).
    - Grandmother (adoptive): Lady Hong of the Namyang Hong clan (1870-1897), daughter of Hong Jong-seok and the first wife of Yi Jun-yong.
    - Grandmother (adoptive): Lady Kim of Guangsan (1878-1955), daughter of Kim Jae-jeong and the second wife of Yi Jun-yong. She became the Duchess Consort of Yi Jun (李埈公妃金氏) in 1912.
  - Great-grandfather (biological): Gojong of Korea (1852-1919), the 26th king of Joseon dynasty and the 1st emperor of the Korean Empire.
  - Great-grandmother (biological): Lady Jang of the Deoksu Jang clan, a lady-in-waiting of Gojong and his unofficial concubine.
    - Grandfather (biological): Prince Yi Kang (1877-1955), the second son of Gojong.
    - Grandmother (biological): Kim Heung-in, a concubine of Yi Kang; also known as "Lady Kim of Suindang" (修仁堂金氏, 수인당 김씨).
      - Father: Yi U (1912-1945), by birth the second son of Yi Kang. He became the heir to Duke Yi Jun in 1917 and succeeded the title in the same year.
      - Mother: Park Chan-ju (1914-1995), a granddaughter of Marquis Pak Yung-hio and the eldest daughter of Park Il-seo; she married in 1935 and became the Duchess Consort of Yi U (李鍝公妃賛珠).
        - Spouse: Kim Chae-yeong (1949-), married in 1971. Their issue includes at least a son.

== See also ==
- History of Korea
- Rulers of Korea
