= Sueyeun Juliette Lee =

Korean American Poet

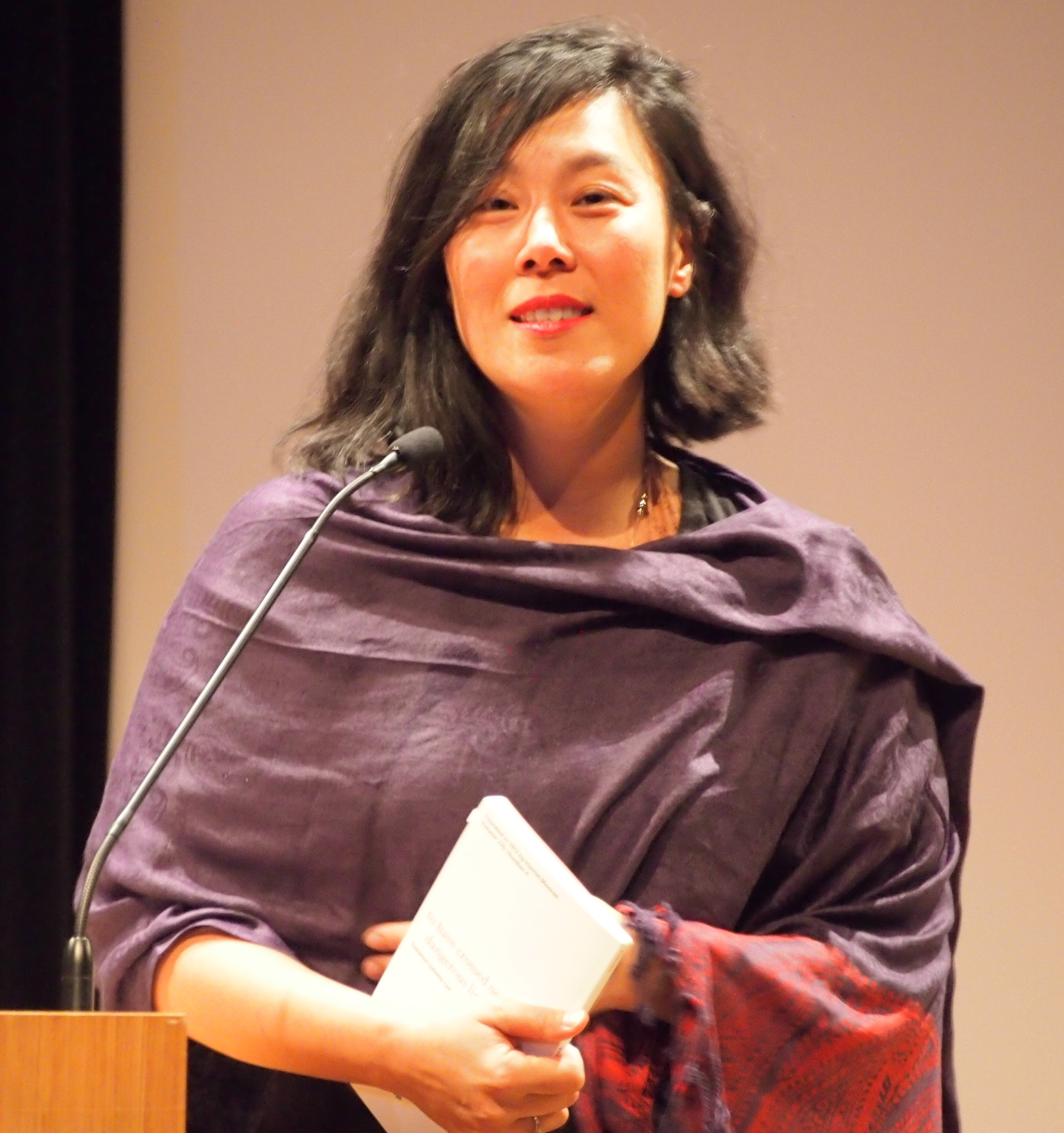
- Lee in 2017, photo by S L O W K I N G
- Born: 1977 (age 48–49); Virginia
- Education: University of Virginia (BA), Masters in Teaching; University of Massachusetts Amherst College of Humanities and Fine Arts (MFA)
- Occupations: Author, poet, performer

Sueyeun Juliette Lee (born 1977) is a Korean American video artist and poet. She is a Senior Associate at Training Resources for the Environmental Community (TREC), co-directing its organizational development strategy.

== Early life and education ==
Lee was born in Virginia. Her parents were immigrant orphans and Korean war survivors. She earned a BA in English and a Master of Teaching from the University of Virginia, and a Master of Fine Arts in Poetry with an Advanced Feminist Studies Certificate from the University of Massachusetts Amherst.

== Career ==
Her first professional work was as a canvassing director for the Public Interest Research Groups. She also taught college and post-graduate writing, gender, and genre courses at University of the Arts and Richard Stockton College. Prior to working at TREC she was a program director at Chinook Fund.

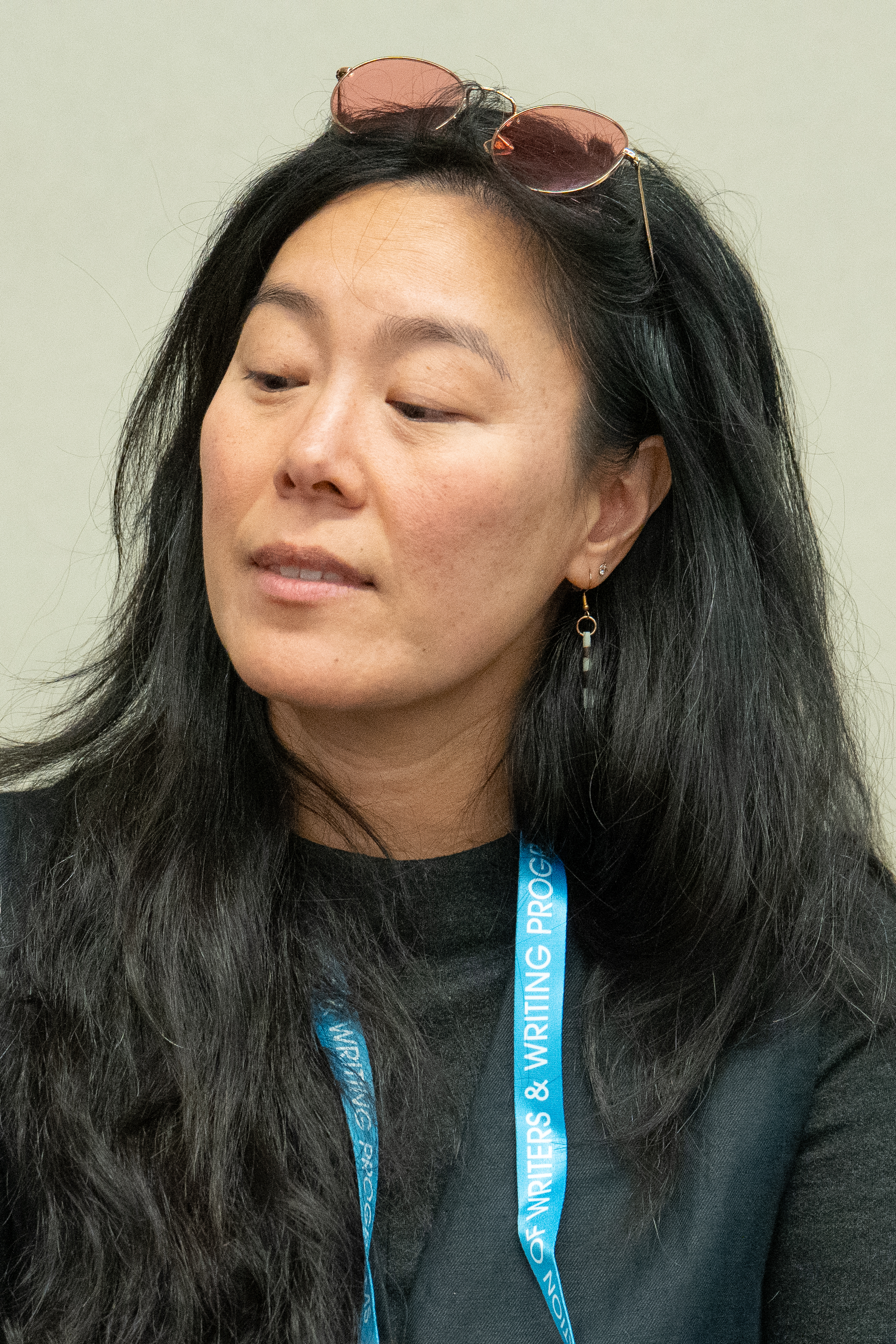
Lee at AWP 2026

Lee's poetry has a focus on "birthright, homeland, and identity." Her poetry analysis looks at multi-ethnic identities and how they shape the work they create. She created an installation and video work, Peace Light which was commissioned by Asian Arts Initiative in 2017 for their 25th anniversary. Her recent book Aerial Concave Without Cloud made Orion Magazine's 28 Recommended Collections.

Lee was a coordinator for the 2014 National Asian American Theater Conference and Festival. She has consulted for the Smithsonian Institution’s Asian American Literature Festival as well as the Asian American Writers’ Workshop. She was a Pew Fellow in the Arts for Literature in 2013 and has held fellowships from Kunstnarhuset Messen and the Ucross Foundation.

She edits Corollary Press, a poetry chapbook series she founded in 2006 which publishes "multi-ethnic innovative writing." In 2015 she held arts residencies in Norway and at Hafnarborg, The Hafnarfjördur Centre of Culture and Fine Art in Iceland.

== Personal life ==
Lee lives in Denver, Colorado.

== Bibliography ==
- That Gorgeous Feeling (Coconut Books, 2008)
- Underground National (Factory School Press, 2010)
- Solar Maximum (Futurepoem, 2015)
- No Comet, That Serpent in the Sky Means Noise (Kore, 2017)
- Aerial Concave Without Cloud (Nightboat, 2022)
