= Lee Ho-baek =

- Born: Seoul, South Korea
- Occupations: CEO of Jaimimage, picture book author
- Writing career
- Genres: Picture books, children's literature

Lee Ho-baek is a South Korean picture book author and the CEO of the picture book publisher Jaimimage. His 2003 book While We Were Out was chosen as one of the Best Illustrated Books of 2003 by the New York Times.

== Career ==
While We Were Out (2000) was translated into seven languages. The New York Times selected it as one of the Best Illustrated Books of 2003, and International Board on Books for Young People awarded it the 2012 Peter Pan Prize.

Bee-bim Bop! was published in the U.S. with text by Linda Sue Park and accompanied by Lee's illustrations.

== Publications ==
=== As author ===
- The Strongest Rooster in the World (in Korean). Jamamjoo. 1997. ISBN 9788986565041.
- While We Were Out. Kane/Miller Book Publishers. 2003. ISBN 9781929132447.
- Bunny Run
- My Hangul Friends

=== As illustrator ===
- Park, Linda Sue (2005). Bee-bim Bop!. Clarion Books. ISBN 9780618265114.
