= Lee Sang-yun =

South Korean professor (born 1974)

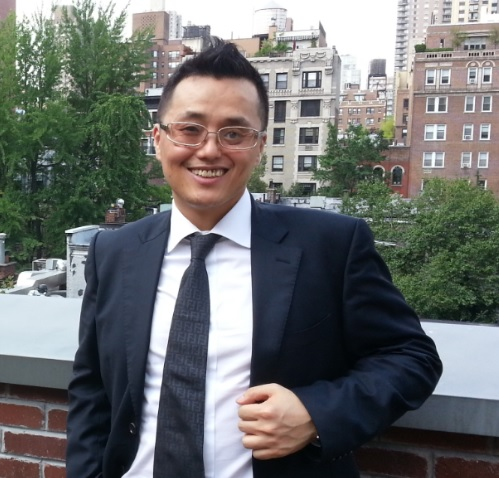
- Born: July 16, 1974 (age 52); Busan, South Korea
- Education: Busan National University - Ph.D
- Occupation: Professor

Korean name
- Hangul: 이상윤
- RR: I Sangyun
- MR: I Sangyun

Lee Sang-yun (Korean: 이상윤; born July 16, 1974) is a South Korean professor. Lee Sang-Yun is one of South Korea's leading marine engineers. With regard to the ferry Sewol (MV Sewol) sinking disaster which took place on April 16, 2014, Lee addressed that many risk elements caused the accident in stages, namely, unqualified personnel, passing Maengol waterway with the strong current in the fast speed, overloading, the shortage of ship ballast equilibrium water, subsequently, he developed the real time ship-risk monitoring & disaster prevention system and the national integrated disaster prevention system related technology and system for precaution or countermeasure against disasters and applied for the patents thereon and decided to donate them to the government organizations or private companies for the public interest as of May 16, one month after the tragedy. Lee is listed in a high school text book of S.Korea as 'The engineering professor who is engineering our future'.

== Selected publications ==
=== Research in Academic Journals ===
- Lee Sang-yun (2016). "A Study on the Ferry Sewol Disaster Cause and Marine Disaster Prevention Informatization with Big Data : In terms of ICT Administrative Spatial Informatization and Maritime Disaster Prevention System development". The Journal of the Korea Institute of Electronic Communication Sciences. 11 (6): 567–580. doi:10.13067/JKIECS.2016.11.6.567.
- Lee Sang-yun (2016). "A Study on Smart Eco-city and Ubiquitous Administrative Spatial Informatization : In terms of Water Pollution and Disaster Prevention of Busan Ecodeltacity". The Journal of the Korea Institute of Electronic Communication Sciences. 11 (9): 827–840. doi:10.13067/JKIECS.2016.11.9.827.
- Lee Sang-yun (2016). "A Study on the Administrative Spatial Informatization and Ubiquitous Smart City : Focus on Busan Centum City". The Journal of the Korea Institute of Electronic Communication Sciences. 11 (4): 351–364. doi:10.13067/JKIECS.2016.11.4.351.
- Lee Sang-yun (2016). "An Exploratory Study on Construction of Electronic Government as Platform with Customized Public Services : to Improve Administrative Aspects of Administrative Processes and Information Systems". Journal of Digital Convergence. 14: 1–12. doi:10.14400/JDC.2016.14.1.1.
- Lee Sang-yun (2015). "An Exploratory Study on Improvement Plan with Industrial Clusters of Shipbuilding Industry of S. Korea: Based on the Location Quotient(LQ) Analysis Method at the time of 2008 Global Financial Crisis". The Journal of Regional Studies and Development. 24: 215–266.
- Lee Sang-yun (2015). "A Study on System for Policy Promotion of Korean Nuclear Power : Risk Governance with Additional Construction of Nuclear Power Plants". The Journal of the Korea Institute of Electronic Communication Sciences. 10: 81–94. doi:10.13067/JKIECS.2015.10.1.81.
- Lee Sang-yun (2015). "A Study on Strategic Improvement Plan and Analysis with Industrial Clusters of Shipbuilding Industry based on the Location Quotient(LQ) Analysis Method: Focusing on the Mega-regional Economic Zone of Pusan, Ulsan, Gyeongnam as Southeast Area of S. Korea". Sahoe Kwahak Yŏn'gu. 27. Institute of Social Sciences, Kookmin University: 255–288. ISSN 1225-9993.
- Lee Sang-yun (2014). "Building a Future on Propulsion System with Immigration, Multicultural Policy of S. Korea: An Exploratory Study in terms of Social Integration". The Institute of Social Sciences CHUNGNAM UNIVERSITY. 25: 175–204. ISSN 1226-5799.
- Lee Sang-yun (2014). "A Study on 'Platform' e-Government for Reducing the digital divide in a Multicultural Society of S. Korea". Journal of Digital Convergence. 12: 1–12. doi:10.14400/JDPM.2014.12.1.1.
- Lee Sang-yun (2013). "A Study on Technology Policy with Spatial Information System of S. Korea Analysed by the Application of Scenario Planning". Journal of Korea Technology Innovation Society. 16: 130–155.
- Lee Sang-yun (2013). "A Study on Development of Technology System for Deep-Sea Unmanned Underwater Robot of S. Korea analysed by the Application of Scenario Planning". The Journal of the Korea Institute of Electronic Communication Sciences. 8: 27–40. doi:10.13067/JKIECS.2013.8.1.027.
- Lee Sang-yun (2013). "A Study on Development of Technology System for MIS(Minimally Invasive Surgery) robot of S. Korea analysed by the Application of Scenario Planning". The Journal of the Korea Institute of Electronic Communication Sciences. 8: 13–26. doi:10.13067/JKIECS.2013.8.1.013.
- Lee Sang-yun (2012). "The Study of SWOT(Strength-Weakness-Opportunity-Threat) Analysis for Micro robot Technology Development and Trend of S. Korea". The Journal of the Korea Institute of Electronic Communication Sciences. 7: 881–895.
- Lee Sang-yun (2012). "The Study on Strategy of National Information for Electronic Government of S. Korea with Public Data analysed by the Application of Scenario Planning". The Journal of the Korea Institute of Electronic Communication Sciences. 7: 1259–1273.
- Lee Sang-yun (2012). "The Study on Development of Technology for Electronic Government of S. Korea with Cloud Computing analysed by the Application of Scenario Planning". The Journal of the Korea Institute of Electronic Communication Sciences. 7: 1245–1258.
- Lee Sang-yun (2012). "Korea's Global Science & Technology(S&T) Agenda -A study on Internationalization of Industrial R&D for Korean SME". The Journal of the Korea Institute of Electronic Communication Sciences. 7: 693–705.
- Lee Sang-yun (2012). "The study of Internet Electronic Voting of S. Korea with Spatial Information System analysed by the Application of Scenario Planning". Journal of Korea Technology Innovation Society. 15: 604–626.
- Lee Sang-yun (2011). "The Study of Industrial Clusters in the Busan, Ulsan, Koungnam as Southeast Area of Korea: Analysed by the Location Quotient(LQ) Analysis Method". Journal of Korea Technology Innovation Society. 14: 599–621.

=== Books ===
- Lee, Sang-yun, 가토다쓰야에게 준 500일의 반성기회 : 한국은 왜 가토다쓰야를 용서했나 Forgiveness and regret, Tatsuya Kato (journalist), 리얼뉴스 (2017), ISBN 979-11-6055-613-1
- Lee, Sang-yun, 안철수의 승부 : 국민의당 성공전략은 무엇인가? Ahn Cheol-soo's game, 리얼뉴스 (2017), ISBN 979-11-6055-614-8
- Lee, Sang-yun, 마따이따이 하록선장, 다시 날다! : 한 남자의 진짜 이야기 : 영한합본 Mataitai captain Harock rising up again!, 리얼뉴스 (2017), ISBN 979-11-6055-612-4
- Lee, Sang-yun, 행정공간정보화(化) 플랫폼 전자정부론 Electronic government as platform for spatial informatization of public administration, 높은새 (2015), ISBN 978-89-93989-06-9
- Lee, Sang-yun, 박근혜 벗기기 : 안철수 등의 한판 승부 Park Geun-hye as the top candidate for 2012 presidential election of South Korea against Ahn Cheol-soo and Korean left-wing politicians, 높은새 (2011), ISBN 978-89-93989-04-5
- Lee, Sang-yun, 과학기술과 국제정치 : 한국의 글로벌 해양전략 Scientific technology and international relations : global marine strategy for Korea, 높은새 (2011), ISBN 978-89-93989-03-8
- Lee, Sang-yun, 기술, 배, 정치 : 기술, 배, 정치는 세계패권을 어떻게 바꿨는가? Technology, politics and ships, 높은새 (2010), ISBN 978-89-93989-02-1
- Lee, Sang-yun, 대통령 만들기 : 게임이론과 죄수의 딜레마 President election strategy game theory prisoner's dilemma, 높은새 (2009), ISBN 978-89-93989-00-7
- Lee, Sang-yun, 하록선장, 다시 날다 : 마따이따이 에피소드 1, 에세이 (2008), ISBN 978-89-6023-156-6

== Patents ==
- Unmanned Aerial Vehicle System operated by smart eyeglass (Application number: KR20130069600A)
- Unmanned Aerial Vehicle System for monitoring jellyfish and trip currents, water-bloom (Application number: KR20130069334A)
- A torpedo system of underwater deception type (Application number: KR20130001332A)
- Complex Unmanned Aerial Vehicle System for Low and High-altitude (Application number: KR20130001350A)
- Micro-robot of Bacterium base with Targeted Cancer-Cells Removal Function
- Simulator System for Micro-nano Robot using 3D-Display Device system
- Micro-robot moved by Compressive Fluid
- KEEL FOIDED INTO A CENTERBOARD (Application number: KR20100096657A)
- A Augmented Reality System for Micro-Nano Robot
- Simulator System for Micro-nano Robot Using Real-Time Characteristic Data
- Auto-docking system for Complex Unmanned Aerial Vehicle
- Unmanned Aerial Vehicle for Precision Strike of Short-range
- Unmanned Aerial Vehicle Network System with spatial information technology
- Complex Unmanned Aerial Vehicle System for Low and High-altitude
- Micro-robot operated by Electromagnetic Coupled Resonance
- e-government system as platform with customized public services
- platform system of e-government with open data integration system of cloud computing
- Wireless Charging System in Car for Mobile Phones and Devices
