= Lee Aerisu =

Korean singer and actress (1910–2009)

- Born: Lee Eum-jeon; January 1, 1910; Kaesong, Korean Empire
- Died: March 31, 2009 (aged 99); Gyeonggi Province, South Korea
- Education: Hyosan Girls' Highschool
- Occupations: Singer; actress
- Years active: 1919–1936
- Spouse: Bae Dong-pil (m. 1935)
- Children: 9
- Musical career
- Genres: Trot; jazz; folk
- Label: Victor Records

Korean name
- Hangul: 이음전
- Hanja: 李音全
- RR: I Eumjeon
- MR: I Ŭmjŏn

Stage name
- Hangul: 이애리수
- Hanja: 李愛利秀
- RR: I Aerisu
- MR: I Aerisu

Lee Eum-jeon (Korean: 이음전; 1910 – March 31, 2009), better known by the stage name Lee Aerisu (이애리수), was a Korean singer and stage actress. Known for her works during the Japanese colonial period in Korea. She is widely regarded as Korea's first "national star" and the "mother of Trot music" also a foundational figure of the Trot genre. Her 1932 masterpiece recording of "Hwangseong Old Site" (황성의 옛터) became the first major hit in Korean recording history, serving as a powerful anthem of national identity during the occupation.

== Early life ==
Lee Aerisu was born Lee Eum-jeon in Gaeseong, Gyeonggi Province, in 1910. Her talent was discovered early, and at the age of nine, she began her professional career by joining the Joseon Yeongeuksa (Joseon Theater Company), a prominent traveling troupe. Under the tutelage of her uncle Jeon Gyeong-hui, a theater director, she received rigorous training in traditional vocalization and dramatic performance.

By her mid-teens, she had become the troupe's primary intermission singer. In an era before radio was widespread, she performed live between theatrical acts, captivating audiences with a voice described as "clear, mournful, and piercingly beautiful". Her popularity was so immense that she was dubbed the "Shooting Star" of the Korean stage.

== Career ==
=== Acting ===
She had already begun to make a name for herself as a child prodigy and she was almost 12 when she started acting and singing on the Chwiseongjwa stage. She made her debut in film Chun-hee, which was released in June 1928. She portrayed the role of So-hong, Wol-seon's maid. She became one of the top actresses in the 1920s in Korea.

=== Breakthrough ===
By the late 1920s, she had gained immense popularity as the troupe's representative "intermission singer," performing musical numbers to entertain audiences between theatrical acts. During this period, she was introduced as the "Shooting Star" of the troupe, a title reflected in her personal poetic motto:

"I am a star among stars, hard and radiant. To see the sunlight for a thousand years. I am a star that never sleeps".

In 1930, she began her formal recording career, releasing seven records including "Paulownia Tree", and "Geumgang Jayu".

=== The "Hwangseong Old Site" Phenomenon ===
While Lee was a successful actress, her transition to recording artist in the early 1930s defined her legacy. The song was composed by Jeon Su-rin with lyrics by Wang Pyeong. They were inspired by the sight of the Manwoldae ruins (the former Goryeo royal palace) in Gaeseong.

She recorded with Victor Records, the song was a sensation. In an era where selling a few thousand records was considered success, "Hwangseong Old Site" sold over 50,000 copies in its first month. The lyrics spoke of a "crumbled fortress" and "fading glory," which the Korean public immediately interpreted as a metaphor for their lost sovereignty to Empire of Japan because the song incited such strong nationalist emotion, the Japanese colonial authorities eventually banned it. However, it continued to be shared through underground performances and clandestine record sales.

=== Peak popularity ===
Between 1932 and 1934, Lee was exceptionally active, releasing over 50 different records across various labels including Victor and Columbia Records. Her repertoire was diverse, spanning popular songs, film soundtracks, folk songs, theater themes, and "nonsense songs" (satirical music). She also became friends with singer Kang Seok-yeon.

=== Visit to Japan ===
Despite media portrayals that labeled them as arch-rivals, Lee maintained a close friendship with fellow star Kang Seok-yeon. In 1932, both singers were invited by the Victor Records headquarters to visit Japan. This trip was a prestigious invitation that allowed them to record at the label's main facilities. The two singers frequently shared the stage and recorded together, defying the "rivalry" narrative constructed by the press.

=== Personal problems and retirement ===
At the height of her fame, Lee's personal life became a national obsession. She fell in love with Bae Dong-pil, a student at Yonhi College (now Yonsei University) from a prestigious family. Due to the rigid social class system, Bae's family vehemently opposed the marriage of a scholar to a "mere singer". In despair, the couple attempted double suicide in 1933 and again in 1935.

The couple survived, and after their families finally relented, Lee chose to marry and retire completely from public life at the age of 23 in 1936.

=== Rediscovery ===
In late 2008, a music historian and journalist tracked down her living in an elderly care facility in Ilsan. To the shock of the nation, the 98-year-old woman was confirmed to be Lee Aerisu. She had lived a quiet life in Seoul, raising nine children (two sons and seven daughters) and never once returning to the stage.

== Personal life ==
At the peak of her fame in 1933, Lee became involved in a highly publicized relationship with Bae Dong-pil, a student at Yonhi College. Due to intense family opposition regarding their social class differences, the couple attempted suicide twice, in 1933 and 1935.

Following their eventual marriage, Lee retired from public life at age 25 to raise her nine children. She lived in complete obscurity for over 70 years, leading to long-standing rumors that she had died shortly after her retirement.

== Later life and death ==
In 2008, music historians located Lee in an elderly care facility in Ilsan, Gyeonggi-do. Her discovery at age 98 made national headlines in South Korea. She died of natural causes on March 31, 2009, at the age of 99. Her wake was held at the Seoul National University Hospital Funeral Hall in Bundang.

== Filmography ==
=== Film ===
Year	Title	Role	Notes
1928	Chun-hee	So-hong	Japanese-produced; her debut feature role.

== Legacy and Influence ==
Lee Aerisu is credited with establishing the Trot genre (originally known as Yuhaeng-ga). Her "tremolo" vocal technique became the standard for Korean popular singers for decades. Her success paved the way for future legends like Lee Nan-young and Kim Jung-gu.

Lee's song "Hwangseong Old Site" is still regularly covered by modern artists and is considered a mandatory part of the Korean musical canon. Lee is credited with establishing the emotional and technical blueprint for the Trot genre. Her use of the minor pentatonic scale and her signature "tremolo" vocal style influenced generations of subsequent artists, including Lee Nan-young.

== See also ==
- Trot (music)
- Music of South Korea
- Japanese colonial period
- Kaesong
