= Lee Joon-ho (businessman) =

South Korean businessman (born 1964)

- 이준호
- Born: 1964; South Korea
- Education: Bachelor of Arts and Science; MS; PhD
- Alma mater: Seoul National University; Korea Advanced Institute of Science and Technology
- Occupation: Business executive
- Years active: 1999–present
- Title: Chairman of the Board of Directors of NHN Entertainment Corporation
- Children: 2

Lee Joon-ho (Korean: 이준호; born 1964) is a South Korean business executive and investor. Credited as a founder of the web portal Naver, Lee is Chairman and Chairman of the Board of Directors of the NHN Corporation. He invests in South Korean real estate through his investment firm JLC.

In April 2024, Forbes estimated his net worth at US$835 million and ranked him 46th richest in the country.

== Education ==
Lee holds a Bachelor of Arts and Science in computer science and engineering from Seoul National University, and received his Master of Science and PhD degrees from the Korea Advanced Institute of Science and Technology (KAIST).

== Career ==
While working as an associate professor at Soongsil University, he developed search technology for Empas, a web portal.

He founded the independent company Search Solution with funding from Naver, which it eventually merged with in 2000. He oversaw the overall management of NHN, Naver's parent company at the time, serving various c-suite positions.

Lee left Naver in 2013 when NHN split into NHN Entertainment Corporation and Naver Corporation. In 2014, he acquired a 9.53% stake in NHN Entertainment, which rebranded to NHN in 2019.
