= Unhyeongung =

Palace in Seoul, South Korea

Coordinates: 37.5761219°N 126.9872332°E

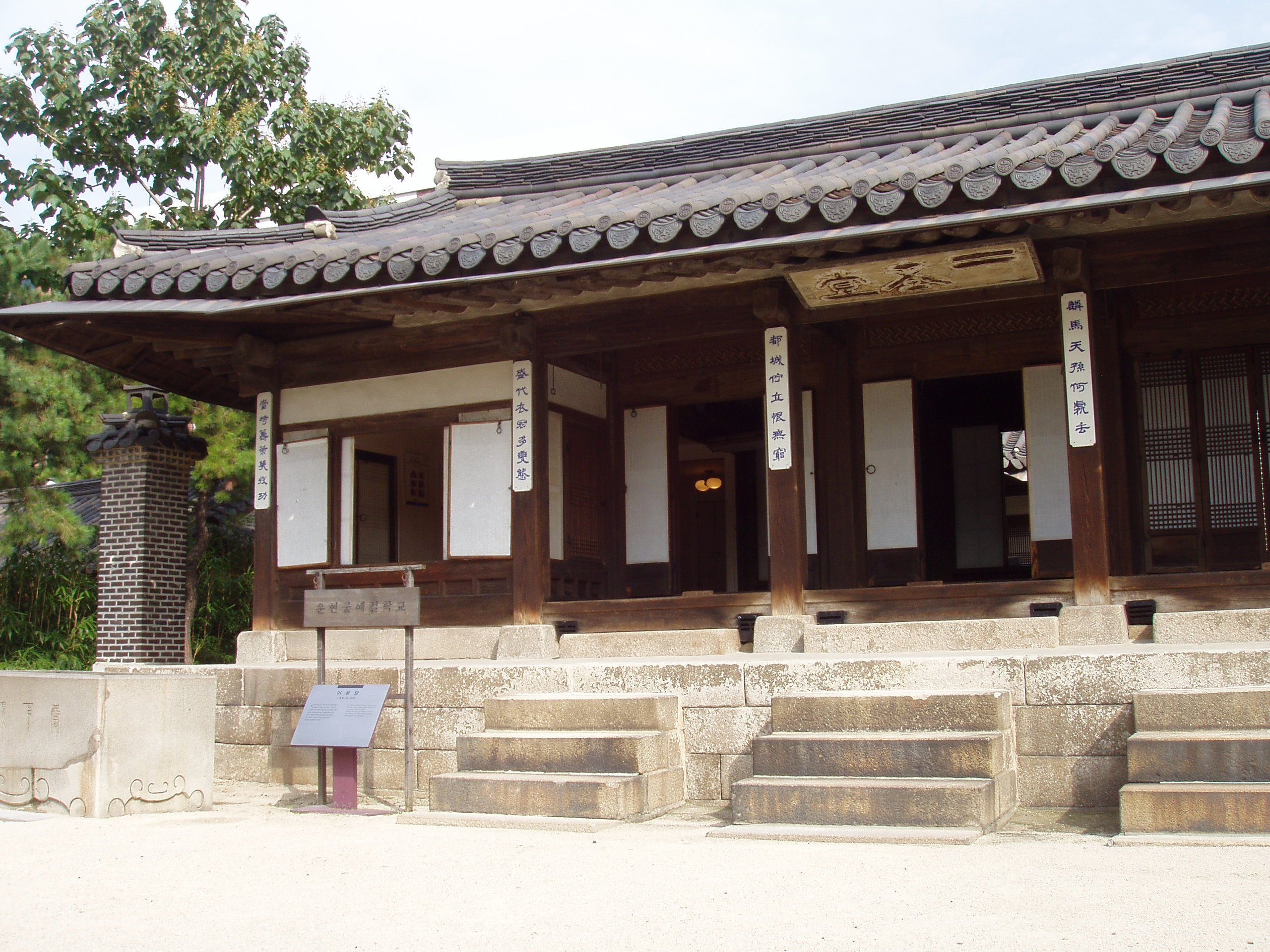
- Interactive map of the Unhyeongung area

General information
- Location: 114-10 Unni-dong, Jongno District, Seoul, South Korea

Design and construction
- Designations

Historic Sites of South Korea
- Official name: Unhyeongung Palace, Seoul
- Designated: 1977-11-22
- Reference no.: 257

Other information
- Public transit: Subway Line 3, Anguk Station, Exit 4

Website
- unhyeongung.or.kr/en (in English)

Korean name
- Hangul: 운현궁
- Hanja: 雲峴宮
- RR: Unhyeongung
- MR: Unhyŏn'gung

Unhyeongung (Korean: 운현궁; Hanja: 雲峴宮), also known as Unhyeongung Royal Residence, is a former Korean royal residence located at 114-10 Unni-dong, Jongno-gu, Seoul. It was formerly the residence of the Heungseon Daewongun, who served as a prince regent of Joseon Korea in the 19th century and fathered Emperor Gojong. Gojong himself lived in Unhyeongung until age 12, when he assumed the throne. It is currently a museum and is open to the public free of charge.

== History ==
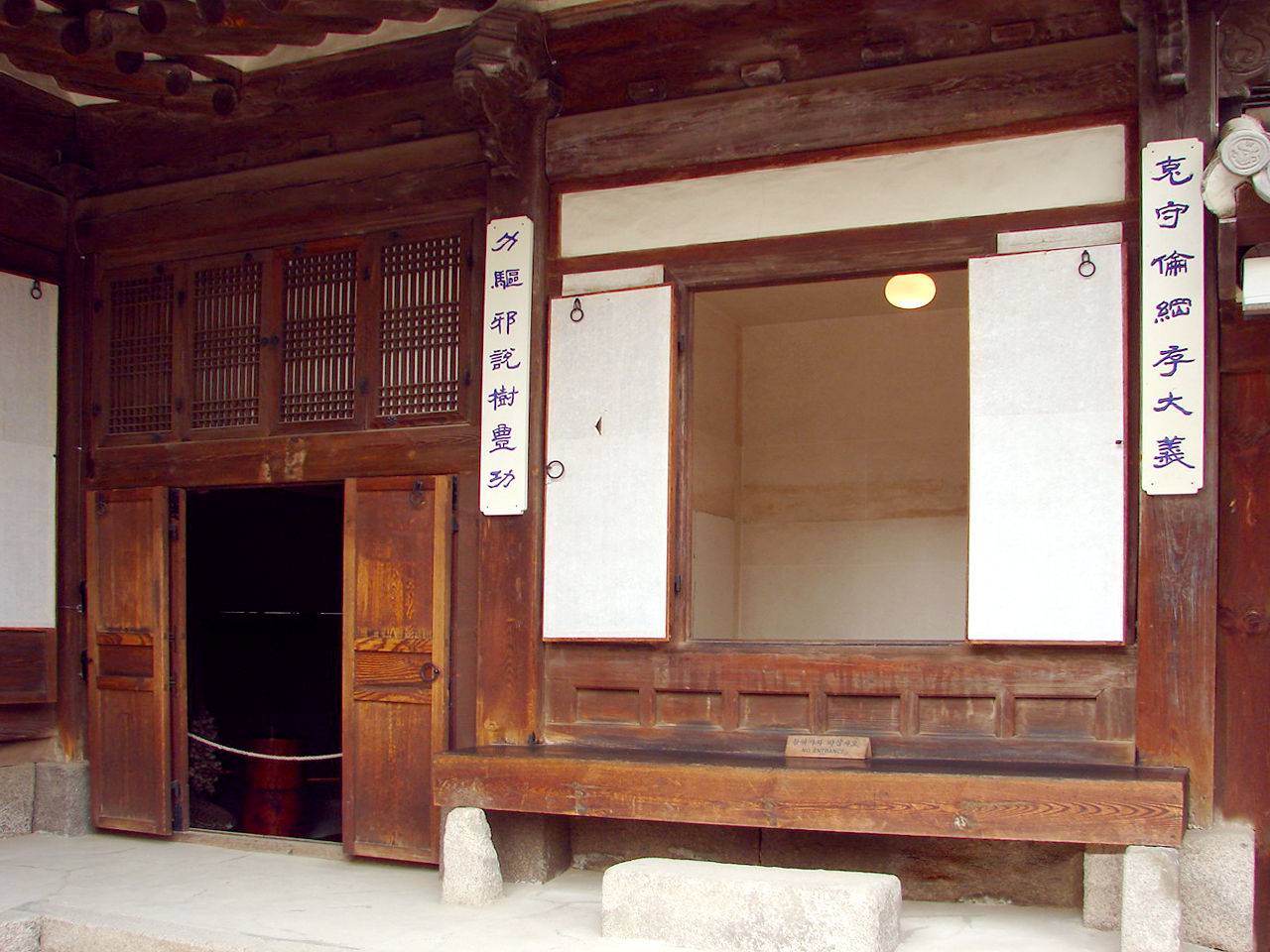

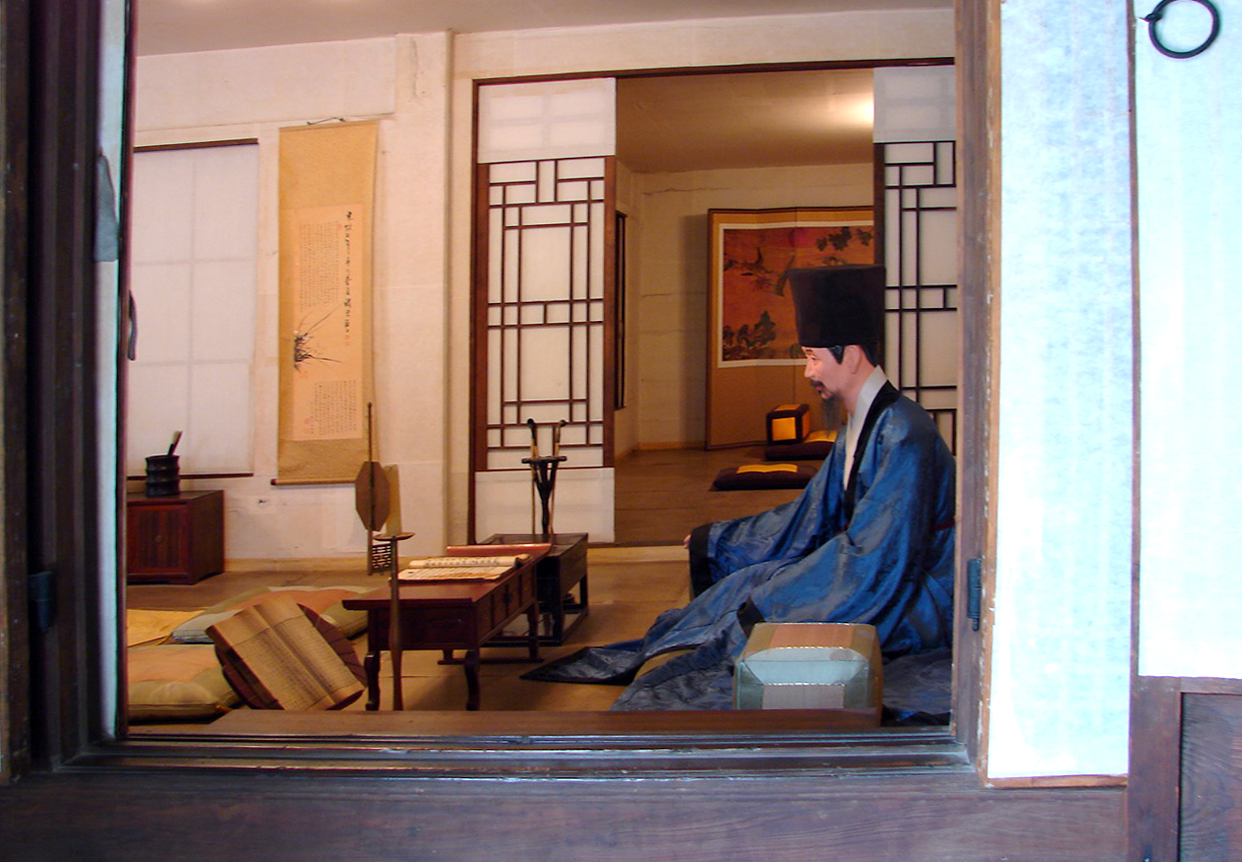

The site dates from the 14th century. Early buildings were damaged or destroyed during the 16th-century Japanese invasions of Korea, but some of the early construction remains. Under the direction of Queen Mother Jo, Unhyeongung was converted into a grander complex with four gates.

Although the residential complex was seized from the descendants of Heungseon Daewongun under Japanese colonial rule, it was returned to them in 1948. In 1993, the descendants sold it to the Seoul government. Unhyeongung subsequently underwent three years of renovations to restore it to its earlier appearance.

Today's complex is smaller than its previous extent, as Duksung Women's University now occupies part of its grounds, as do other smaller businesses, including Unhyeon Kindergarten and Byeolhadang hanok guesthouse.

== Structures ==
Some of the interiors have been refurnished and contain mannequins dressed in typical clothing styles for various stations of life in Korean history. The complex also contains a small museum. The residence is open to the public, free of charge.

=== Norakdang Hall ===
Norakdang is the largest building within the complex and was the site of the wedding of King Gojong and Empress Myeongseong. Norakdang also was as one of the two residential buildings for women.

The most notable structure inside Norakdang is the kitchen, which was most likely used for food preparation when hosting important events. The hall held many important events such as birthday parties and related ceremonies.

A reenactment of a traditional wedding ceremony continues to be held at Norakdang.

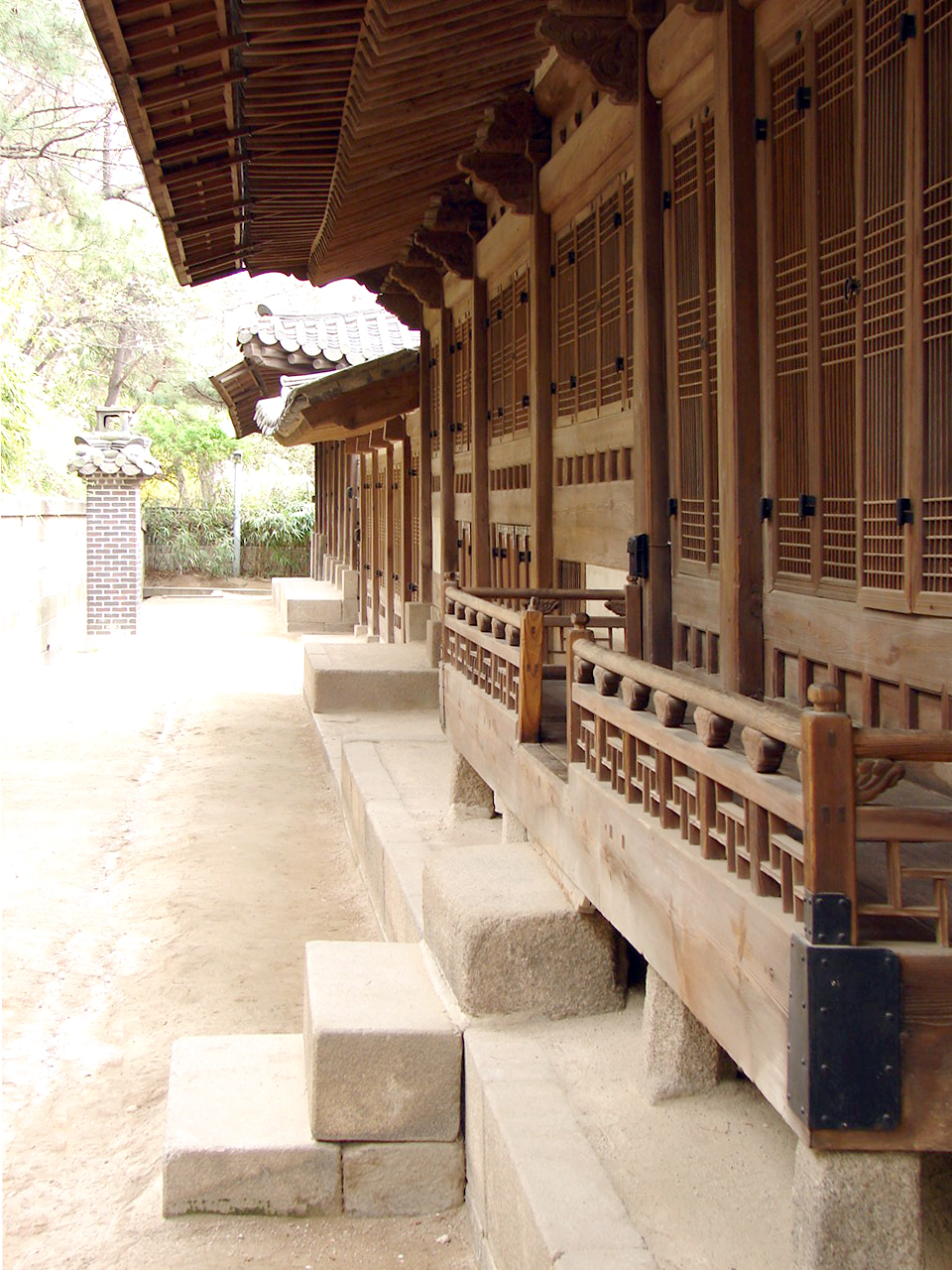
Sujiksa at Unhyeongung

=== Noandang Hall ===
Noandang was where the Heungseon Daewongun received his guests. It also served as the leisure quarters for the men, though the hall was not just a place of leisure and entertainment. The Heungseon Daewongun, as the father of a young Emperor, carried out all his business from Noandang.

=== Irodang Hall ===
Irodang is one of two woman's residences at Unhyeongung.

=== Sujiksa ===
Sujiksa is a small row of rooms to the right of the entrance. These rooms provided housing for the servants and guards.

== Royal wedding ceremony ==
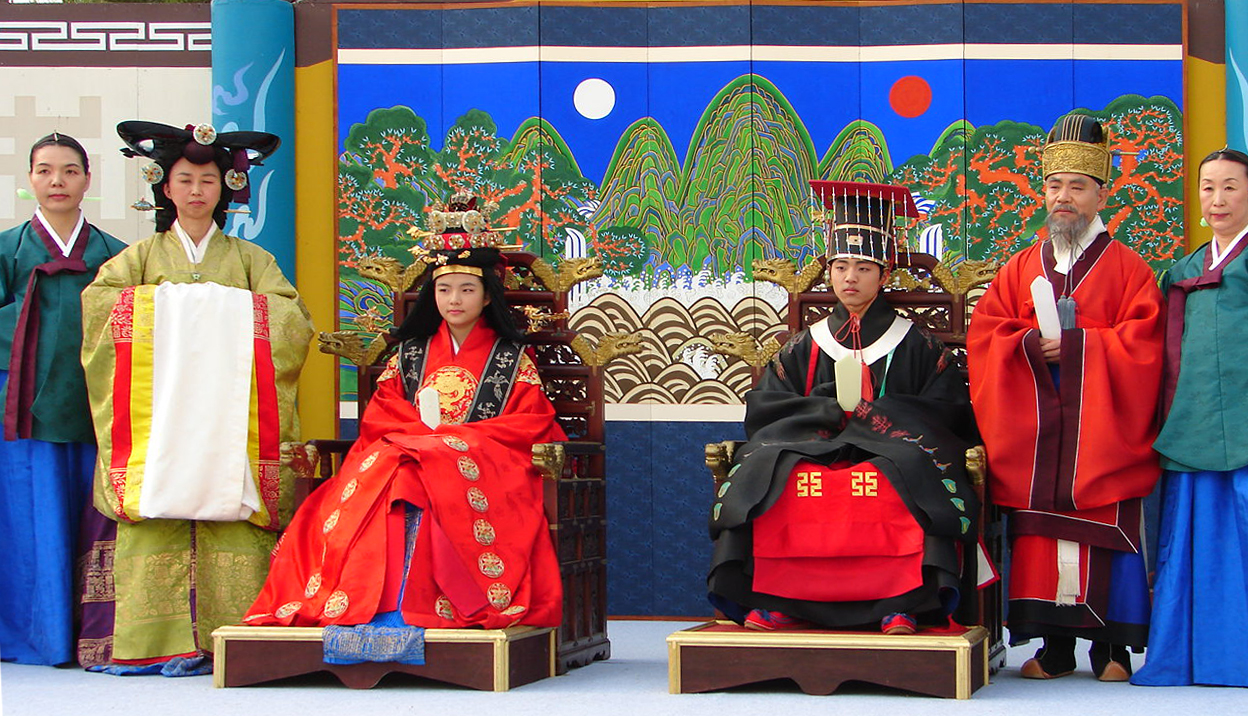
Royal wedding ceremony reenactment of King Gojong and Empress Myeongseong, along with members of the royal court

Unhyeongung was the site of the last royal wedding ceremony, between King Gojong and Empress Myeongseong, on March 21, 1866. A reenactment of this ceremony is held at Unhyeongung in the spring and fall of every year.

This ceremony is an exact reenactment, based on thorough historical research and consultation by the palace's panel of experts, of the regal and grandeur style of the imperial family's royal wedding ceremony. The reenactment displays the traditional royal costumes and lifestyles of the Joseon dynasty.

== Gallery ==
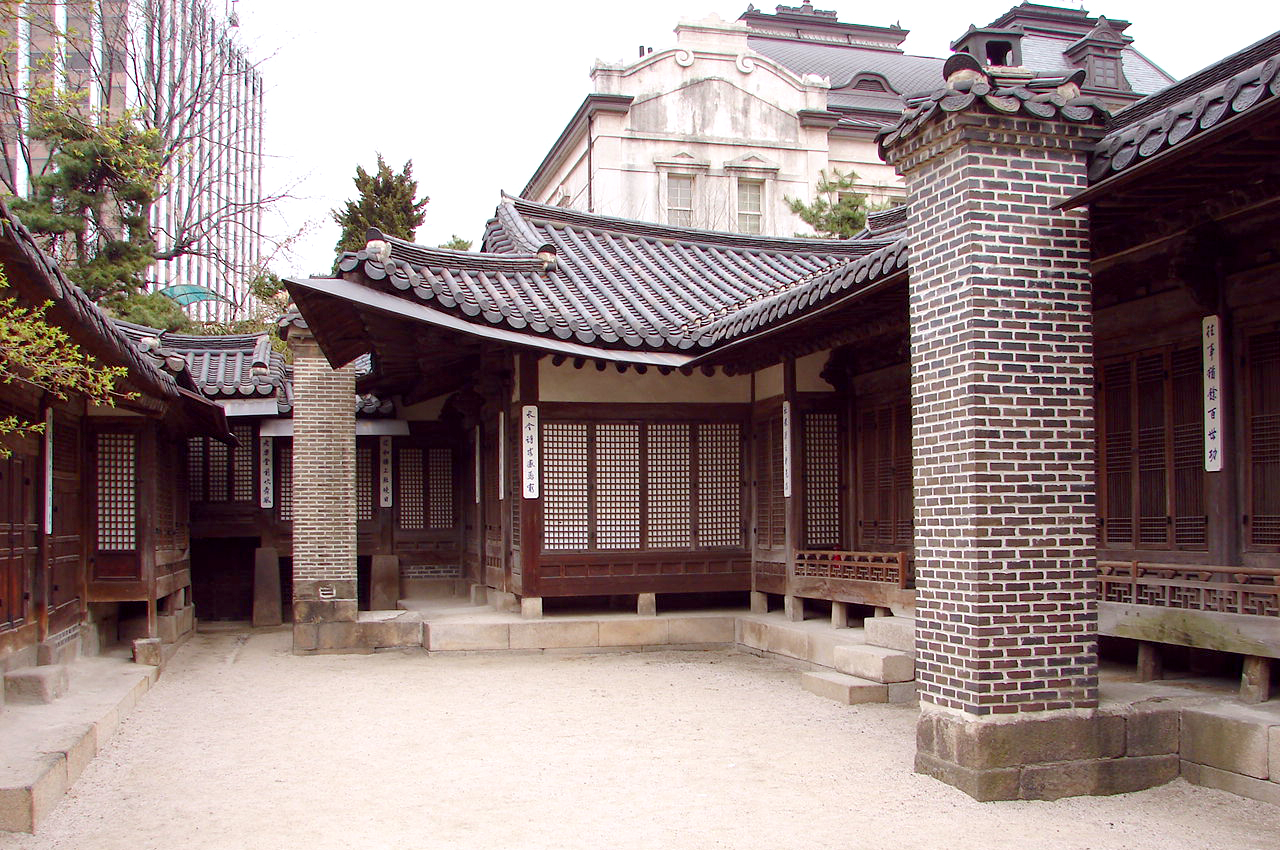

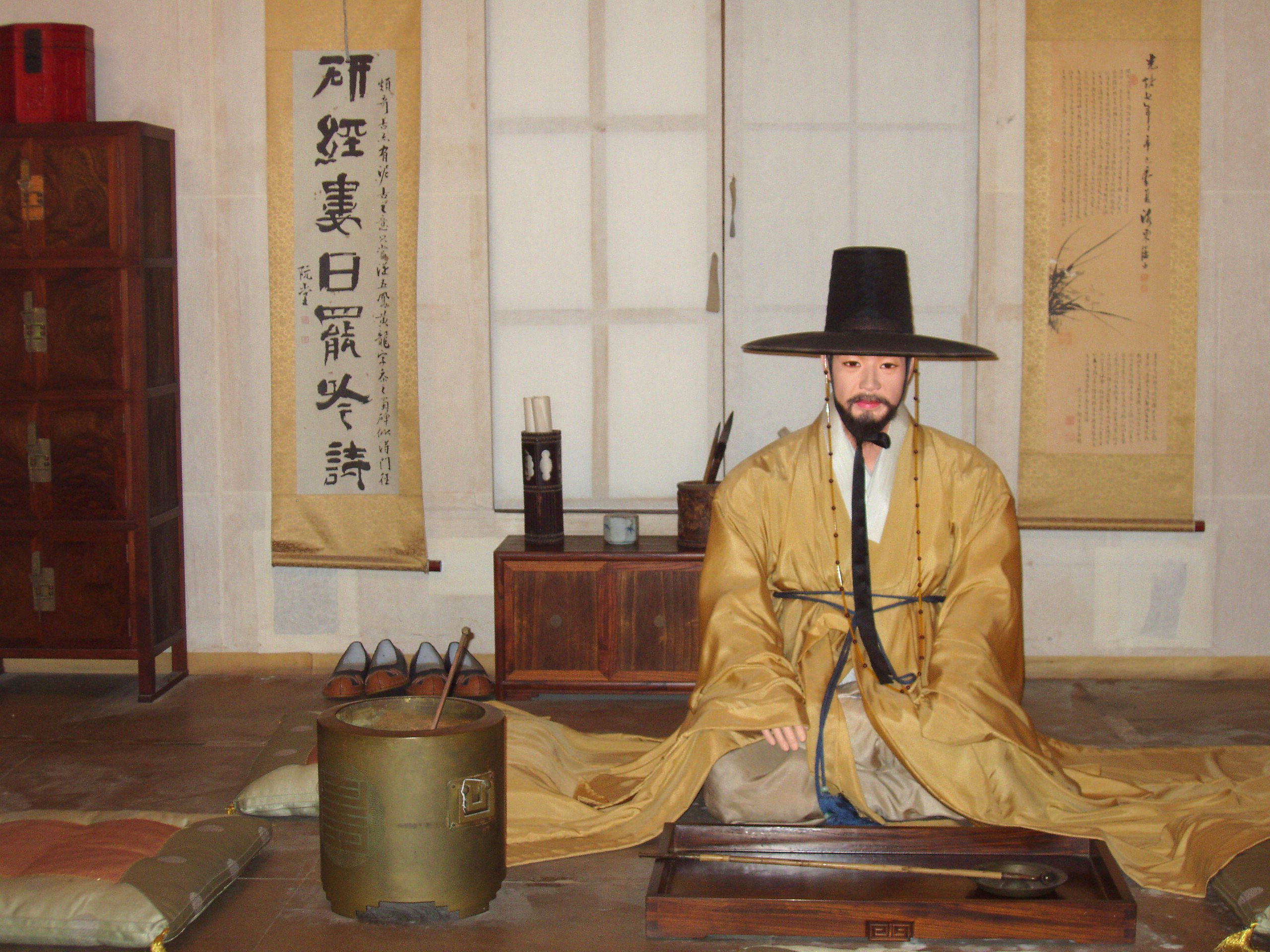

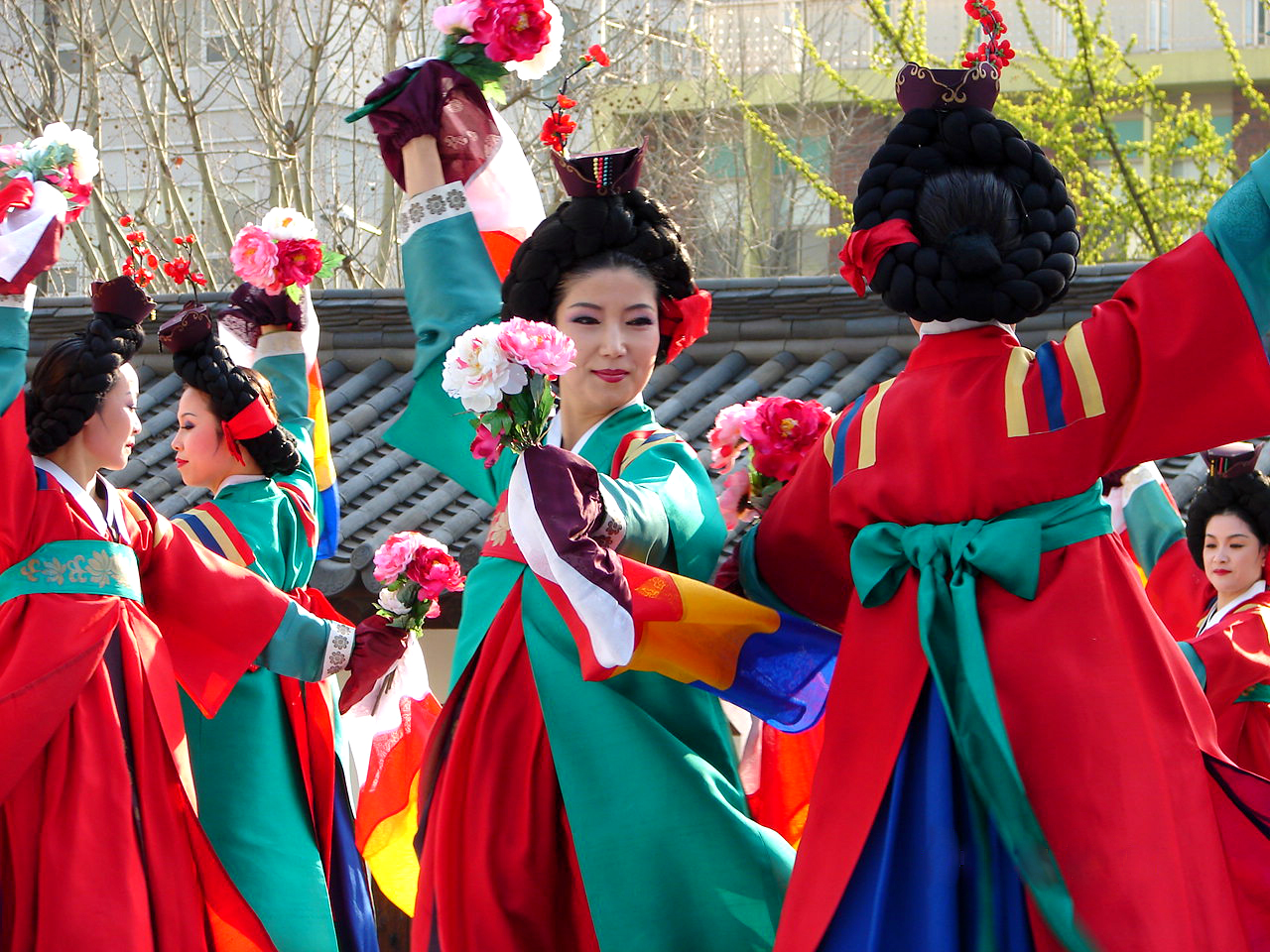
Royal wedding ceremony reenactment

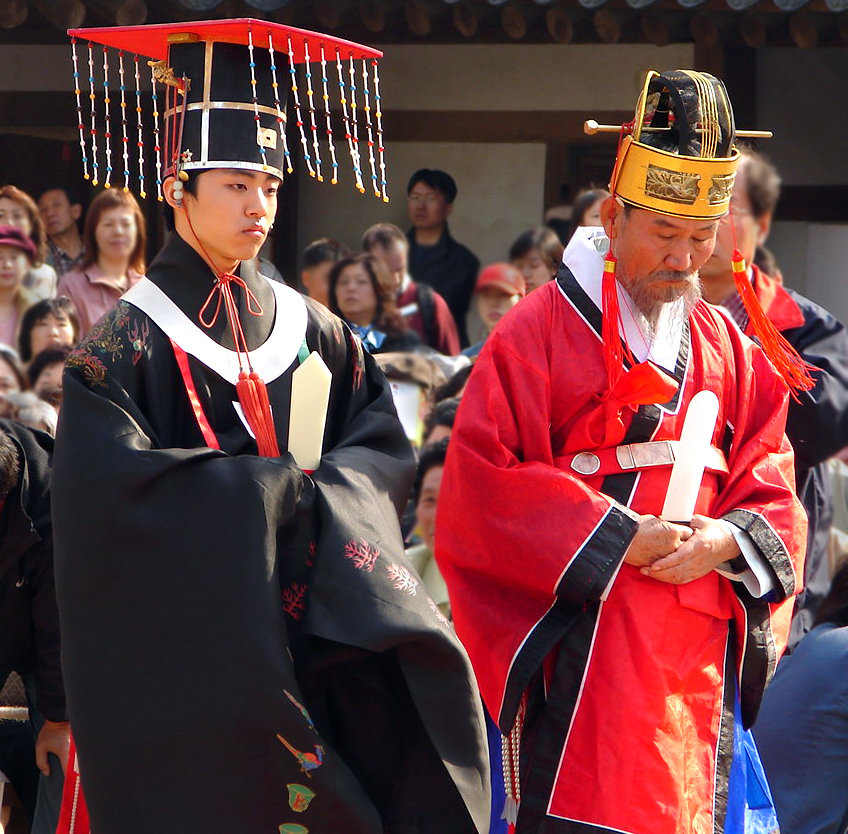
Royal wedding ceremony reenactment

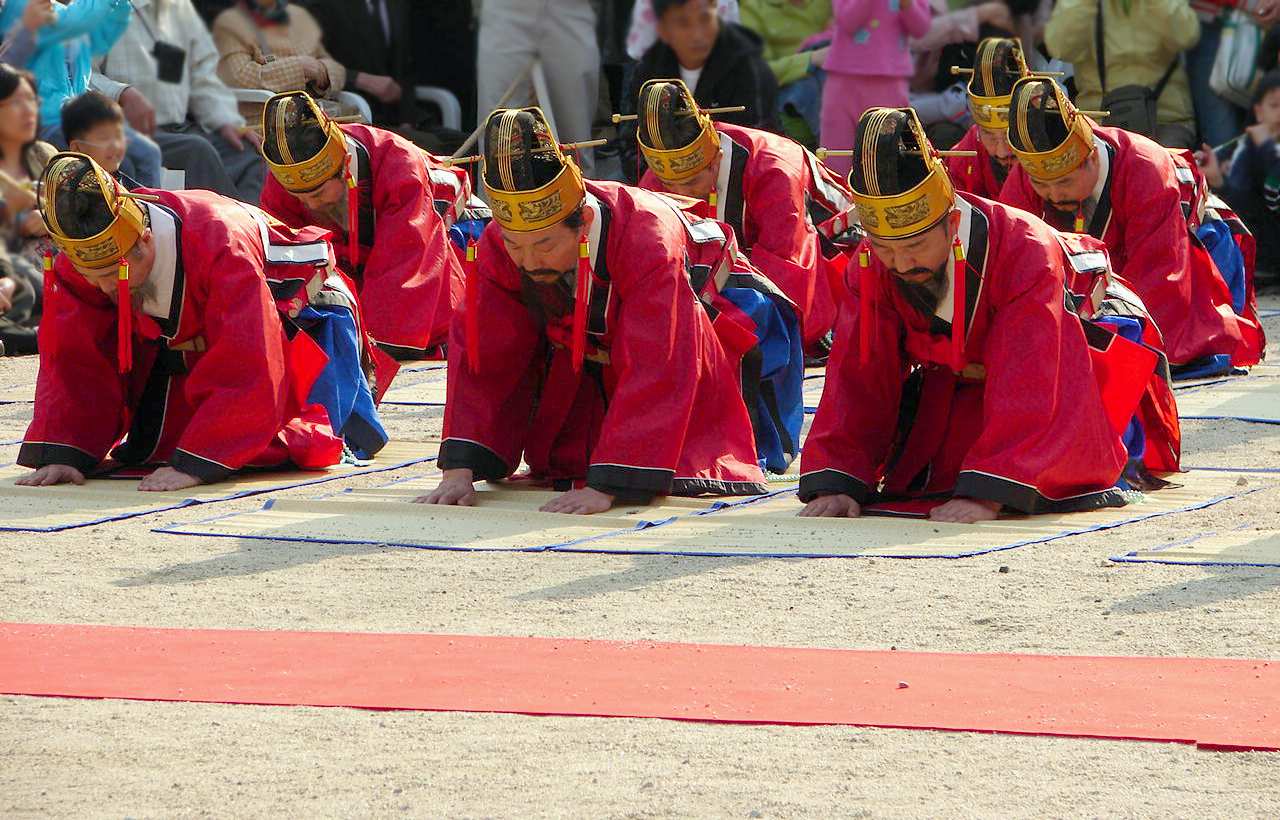
Royal wedding ceremony reenactment

== See also ==
- Gyeongbokgung
- Culture of Korea

== Bibliography ==
- Hoon, Shin Young (2008). The Royal Palaces of Korea: Six Centuries of Dynastic Grandeur (Hardback). Singapore: Stallion Press. ISBN 978-981-08-0806-8.
