= Moon-Moo (teul) =

Twenty-first ITF Taekwon-Do pattern

21. Moon-Moo
문무
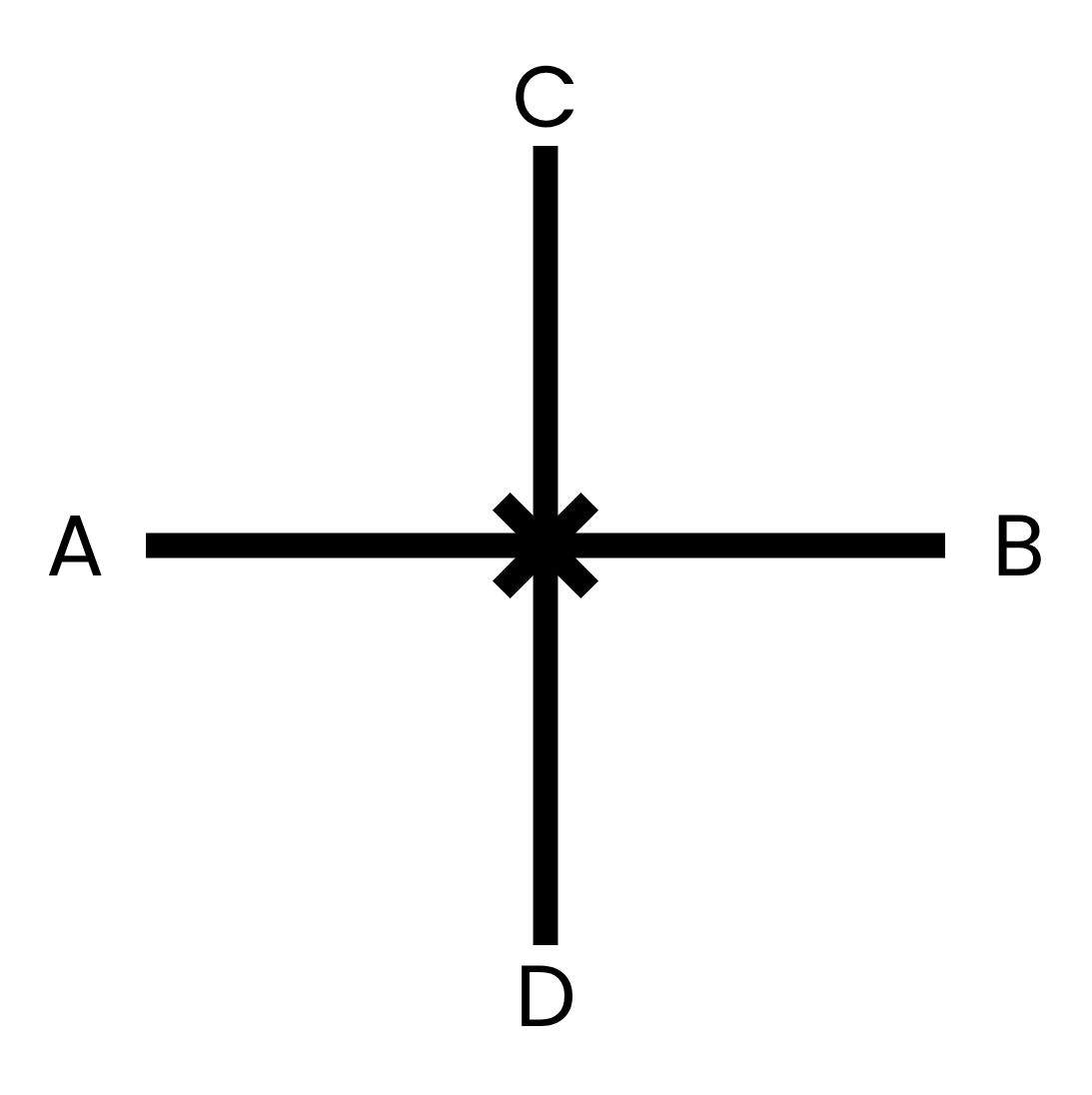
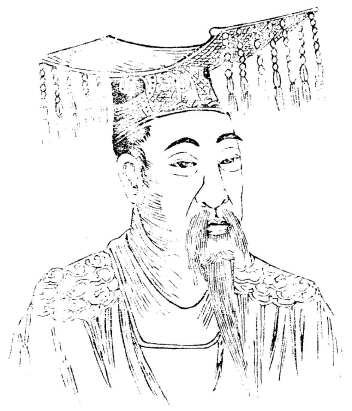
- Diagram of Moon-Moo Munmu of Silla
- Movements: 61
- Begin stance: Parallel ready stance
- Return foot: Right
- Meaning: Munmu of Silla
- Associated dan: 4th

Moon-Moo (Korean: 문무; RR: Munmu, Korean pronunciation: [mun.mu]) is the twenty-first Taekwon-Do teul, as defined by the International Taekwon-Do Federation. The pattern consists of 61 movements and is taught to students with the 4th dan (black belt) and necessary to know to obtain the 5th dan.

== Meaning ==
The pattern's name refers to Munmu of Silla, the 30th King of Silla and the first one to do so after the unification of the Three Kingdoms of Korea. Before becoming king in 661, he was a naval officer and diplomat. He reigned for twenty years over unified Silla and posthumously received the nickname Dragon King.

=== Number of movements ===
The 61 movements of Moon-Moo symbolize the last two digits of the year 661, in which Munmu ascended to the throne.

== Movements ==
Nr.	English description	Korean description (in Hangul)	Korean description (in Revised Romanisation)
	Parallel ready stance facing D	나란히준비서기	narani junbi seogi
1	Turn the face to B while forming a right bending ready A toward B. Perform in a slow motion.	구부려준비서기, 느린동작	guburyeo junbi seogi, neurin dongjak
2	Execute a high side piercing kick to B with the left foot. Perform in a slow motion.	높운데옆차지르기, 느린동작	nopunde yeop cha jireugi, neurin dongjak
3	Execute a high side piercing kick to B with the left foot. Perform 2 and 3 in a double kick.	높운데옆차지르기, 차례차례동작	nopunde yeop cha jireugi, charye charye dongjak
4	Lower the left foot to B to form a sitting stance toward D while executing a middle thrust to D with the right flat fingertip.	앉는서엎은손끝가운데뚫기	anneun seo eopeun sonkkeut gaunde ttulki
5	Execute a high reverse hooking kick to B with the right foot. Perform in a slow motion.	높은데반대돌려걸어차기, 느린동작	nopeunde bandae dollyeo georeo chagi, neurin dongjak
6	Lower the right foot to B in a jumping motion to form a right X-stance toward C while executing a middle side strike to B with the right knife-hand.	뛰며겨차서손칼옆때리기	ttwimyeo gyeocha seo sonkal yeop ttaerigi
7	Move the left foot to A forming a left walking stance toward A while executing a pressing block to A with the right palm.	걷는서손바닥눌러막기	geonneun seo sonbadak nulleo makgi
8	Move the right foot to A to form a right walking stance toward A at the same time executing a pressing block with the left palm.	걷는서손바닥눌러막기	geonneun seo sonbadak nulleo makgi
9	Execute a high side block to B with the left knife-hand and a low side block to A with the right knife-hand while forming a right one-leg stance toward D, pulling the left reverse footsword to the right knee joint. Perform in slow motion.	외발서손칼낮은데옆막기손칼데옆때반대옆막기, 느린동작	oebal seo sonkal najeunde yeop makgi sonkal de yeop ttae bandae yeop makgi, neurin dongjak
10	Lower the left foot to the right foot and then turn the face to A while forming a left bending ready stance A toward A. Perform in slow motion.	구부려준비서기, 느린동작	guburyeo junbi seogi, neurin dongjak
11	Execute a high side piercing kick to A with the right foot. Perform in a slow motion.	높운데옆차지르기, 느린동작	nopunde yeop cha jireugi, neurin dongjak
12	Execute a high side piercing kick to A with the right foot. Perform 11 and 12 in a double kick.	높운데옆차지르기, 차례차례동작	nopunde yeop cha jireugi, charye charye dongjak
13	Lower the right foot to a to form a sitting stance toward D while executing a middle thrust to D with the left flat fingertip.	앉는서엎은손끝가운데뚫기	anneun seo eopeun sonkkeut gaunde ttulki
14	Execute a high reverse hooking kick to A with the left foot. Perform in a slow motion.	높은데반대돌려걸어차기, 느린동작	nopeunde bandae dollyeo georeo chagi, neurin dongjak
15	Lower the left foot to A in a jumping motion to form a left X-stance toward C while executing a middle side strike to A with the left knife-hand.	뛰며겨차서손칼옆때리기	ttwimyeo gyeocha seo sonkal yeop ttaerigi
16	Move the right foot to B forming a right walking stance toward B while executing a pressing block to B with the left palm.	걷는서손바닥눌러막기	geonneun seo sonbadak nulleo makgi
17	Move the left foot to B to form a left walking stance toward B at the same time executing a pressing block with the right palm.	걷는서손바닥눌러막기	geonneun seo sonbadak nulleo makgi
18	Execute a high side block to A with the right knife-hand and a low side block to B with the left knife-hand while forming a left one-leg stance toward D, pulling the right reverse footsword to the left knee joint. Perform in slow motion.	외발서손칼낮은데옆막기손칼데옆때반대옆막기, 느린동작	oebal seo sonkal najeunde yeop makgi sonkal de yeop ttae bandae yeop makgi, neurin dongjak
19	Turn the face to C while forming a left bending ready stance B toward D.	구부려준비서기	guburyeo junbi seogi
20	Execute a high back piercing kick to C with the right foot. Perform in slow motion.	높은데뒷차지르기, 느린동작	nopeunde dwit cha jireugi, neurin dongjak
21	Lower the right foot to C to form a left walking stance toward D while executing a middle punch to D with the right fist.	걷는서반대앞지르기	geonneun seo bandae ap jireugi
22	Turn the face to C while forming a right bending ready stance B toward D.	구부려준비서기	guburyeo junbi seogi
23	Execute a high back piercing kick to C with the left foot. Perform in slow motion.	높은데뒷차지르기, 느린동작	nopeunde dwit cha jireugi, neurin dongjak
24	Lower the left foot to C to form a right walking stance toward D while executing a middle punch to D with the left fist.	걷는서반대앞지르기	geonneun seo bandae ap jireugi
25	Slide to C forming a right rear foot stance toward D while executing a downward block with the left palm.	미끌며뒷발서손바닥반대내려막기	mikkeulmyeo dwitbal seo sonbadak bandae naeryeo makgi
26	Execute a middle side front snap kick to D with the left foot keeping the position of the hands as they were in 25.	가운데옆앞차부시기	gaunde yeop ap cha busigi
27	Lower the left foot to D and then move the right foot to C in a stamping motion to form a sitting stance toward A while executing a middle side strike to C with the right side fist.	구르며앉는서옆주먹가운데옆때리기	gureumyeo anneun seo yeop jumeok gaunde yeop ttaerigi
28	Slide to C maintaining a sitting stance toward A while executing a scooping block with the left palm.	미끌며앉는서손바닥들어막기	mikkeulmyeo anneun seo sonbadak deureo makgi
29	Execute a middle punch to A with the right fist while maintaining a sitting stance toward A. Perform 28 and 29 in a connecting motion.	앉는서앞지르기, 이어진동작	anneun seo ap jireugi, ieojin dongjak
30	Execute a low side block to D with the left knife-hand while maintaining a sitting stance toward A.	앉는서손칼낮은데옆막기	anneun seo sonkal najeunde yeop makgi
31	Move the left foot just beyond the right foot in a quick motion while executing a middle side pushing kick to C with the right foot.	가운데옆차밀기	gaunde yeop cha milgi
32	Lower the right foot to C and then execute a high reverse turning kick to C with the left foot.	높은데반대돌려차기	nopeunde bandae dollyeo chagi
33	Lower the left foot to C to form a left walking stance toward C while executing a high side block to C with the left knife-hand.	걷는서손칼데옆때옆막기	geonneun seo sonkal de yeop ttae yeop makgi
34	Slide to D forming a left rear foot stance toward C while executing a downward block with the right palm.	미끌며뒷발서손바닥반대내려막기	mikkeulmyeo dwitbal seo sonbadak bandae naeryeo makgi
35	Execute a middle side front snap kick to C with the right foot keeping the position of the hands as they were in 34.	가운데옆앞차부시기	gaunde yeop ap cha busigi
36	Lower the right foot to C and then move the left foot to D in a stamping motion to form a sitting stance toward A while executing a middle side strike to D with the left side fist.	구르며앉는서옆주먹가운데옆때리기	gureumyeo anneun seo yeop jumeok gaunde yeop ttaerigi
37	Slide to D maintaining a sitting stance toward A while executing a scooping block with the right palm.	미끌며앉는서손바닥들어막기	mikkeulmyeo anneun seo sonbadak deureo makgi
38	Execute a middle punch to A with the left fist while maintaining a sitting stance toward A. Perform 37 and 38 in a connecting motion.	앉는서앞지르기, 이어진동작	anneun seo ap jireugi, ieojin dongjak
39	Execute a low side block to C with the right knife-hand while maintaining a sitting stance toward A.	앉는서손칼낮은데옆막기	anneun seo sonkal najeunde yeop makgi
40	Move the right foot just beyond the left foot in a quick motion while executing a middle side pushing kick to D with the left foot.	가운데옆차밀기	gaunde yeop cha milgi
41	Lower the left foot to D and then execute a high reverse turning kick to D with the right foot.	높은데반대돌려차기	nopeunde bandae dollyeo chagi
42	Lower the right foot to D to form a right walking stance toward D while executing a high side block to D with the right knife-hand.	걷는서손칼데옆때옆막기	geonneun seo sonkal de yeop ttae yeop makgi
43	Move the left foot to D and then execute a high twisting kick to AD with the right foot.	높은데비틀어차기	nopeunde biteureo chagi
44	Lower the right foot to C forming a left walking stance toward D while executing a side back strike to C with the right back fist and extending the left fist to D.	걷는서등주먹반대옆뒷때리기	geonneun seo deung jumeok bandae yeop dwit ttaerigi
45	Execute a front strike to D with the right back fist while shifting to C maintaining a left walking stance toward D.	미끌며걷는서등주먹반대앞때리기	mikkeulmyeo geonneun seo deung jumeok bandae ap ttaerigi
46	Move the right foot to D and then execute a high twisting kick to BD with the left foot.	높은데비틀어차기	nopeunde biteureo chagi
47	Lower the left foot to C to form a right walking stance toward D while executing a side back strike to C with the left back fist and extending the right fist to D.	걷는서등주먹반대옆뒷때리기	geonneun seo deung jumeok bandae yeop dwit ttaerigi
48	Execute a front strike to D with the left back fist while shifting to C maintaining a right walking stance toward D.	미끌며걷는서등주먹반대앞때리기	mikkeulmyeo geonneun seo deung jumeok bandae ap ttaerigi
49	Execute a sweeping kick to D with the left side sole keeping the position of the hands as they were in 48 and then lower it to D forming a right L-stance toward D while executing a middle guarding block to D with the forearm.	쓸어차기, ㄴ자서대비막기	sseureo chagi, nieunja seo daebi makgi
50	Execute a side checking kick to D and then again a middle side thrusting kick to D with the left foot forming a forearm guarding block. Perform in a consecutive kick.	옆차멈추기, 가운데옆차뚫기, 차례차례동작	yeop cha meomchugi, gaunde yeop cha ttulki, charye charye dongjak
51	Lower the left foot to D forming a right L-stance toward D while executing a middle outward strike to D with the left knife-hand.	ㄴ자서손칼옆때리기	nieunja seo sonkal yeop ttaerigi
52	Execute a sweeping kick to D with the right side sole and then lower it to D to form a left L-stance toward D while executing a middle guarding block to D with the forearm.	쓸어차기, ㄴ자서목낮대비막기	sseureo chagi, nieunja seo daebi makgi
53	Execute a side checking kick to D and then again a middle side thrusting kick to D with the right foot forming a forearm guarding block. Perform in a consecutive kick.	옆차멈추기, 가운데옆차뚫기, 차례차례동작	yeop cha meomchugi, gaunde yeop cha ttulki, charye charye dongjak
54	Lower the right foot to D forming a left L-stance toward D while executing a middle outward strike to D with the right knife-hand.	ㄴ자서손칼옆때리기	nieunja seo sonkal yeop ttaerigi
55	Move the right foot to C and then turn counter clockwise pivoting with the right foot to form a left walking stance toward C while executing a middle punch to C with the right fist.	이보옮겨디디며돌기걷는서반대앞지르기	ibo olgyeo didimyeo dolgi geonneun seo bandae ap jireugi
56	Jump to C to form a right X-stance toward AC while executing a low punch to C with the left fist and bringing the right fist on the left shoulder.	뛰며겨차서낮은데앞지르기	ttwimyeo gyeocha seo najeunde ap jireugi
57	Jump to D forming a left X-stance toward AD while executing a low punch to D with the right fist and bringing the left fist on the right shoulder.	뛰며겨차서낮은데앞지르기	ttwimyeo gyeocha seo najeunde ap jireugi
58	Jump to execute a mid-air kick to D with the right foot while spinning clockwise.	뛰어돌며차기	ttwieo dolmyeo chagi
59	Land to D to form a left L-stance toward D while executing a middle guarding block to D with a knife-hand.	ㄴ자서손칼대비막기	nieunja seo sonkal daebi makgi
60	Move the right foot to the side rear of the left foot and then the left foot to C to form a right walking stance toward D while executing a rising block with the left arc-hand.	이보옮겨디디며들어오기걷는서반달손반대추켜막기	ibo olgyeo didimyeo deureogi geonneun seo bandalson bandae chukyeo makgi
61	Execute a high punch to D with the right fist while maintaining a right walking stance toward D.	걷는서높은데앞지르기	geonneun seo nopeunde ap jireugi
	Move the right foot back to parallel ready stance facing D.	나란히준비서기	narani junbi seogi

== Trivia ==
- Moon-Moo is one of the patterns that refers to the Kingdom of Silla, next to Won-Hyo, Hwa-Rang, and Yoo-Sin.
