= Teul =

Detailed choreographed patterns of movements in ITF Taekwon-Do

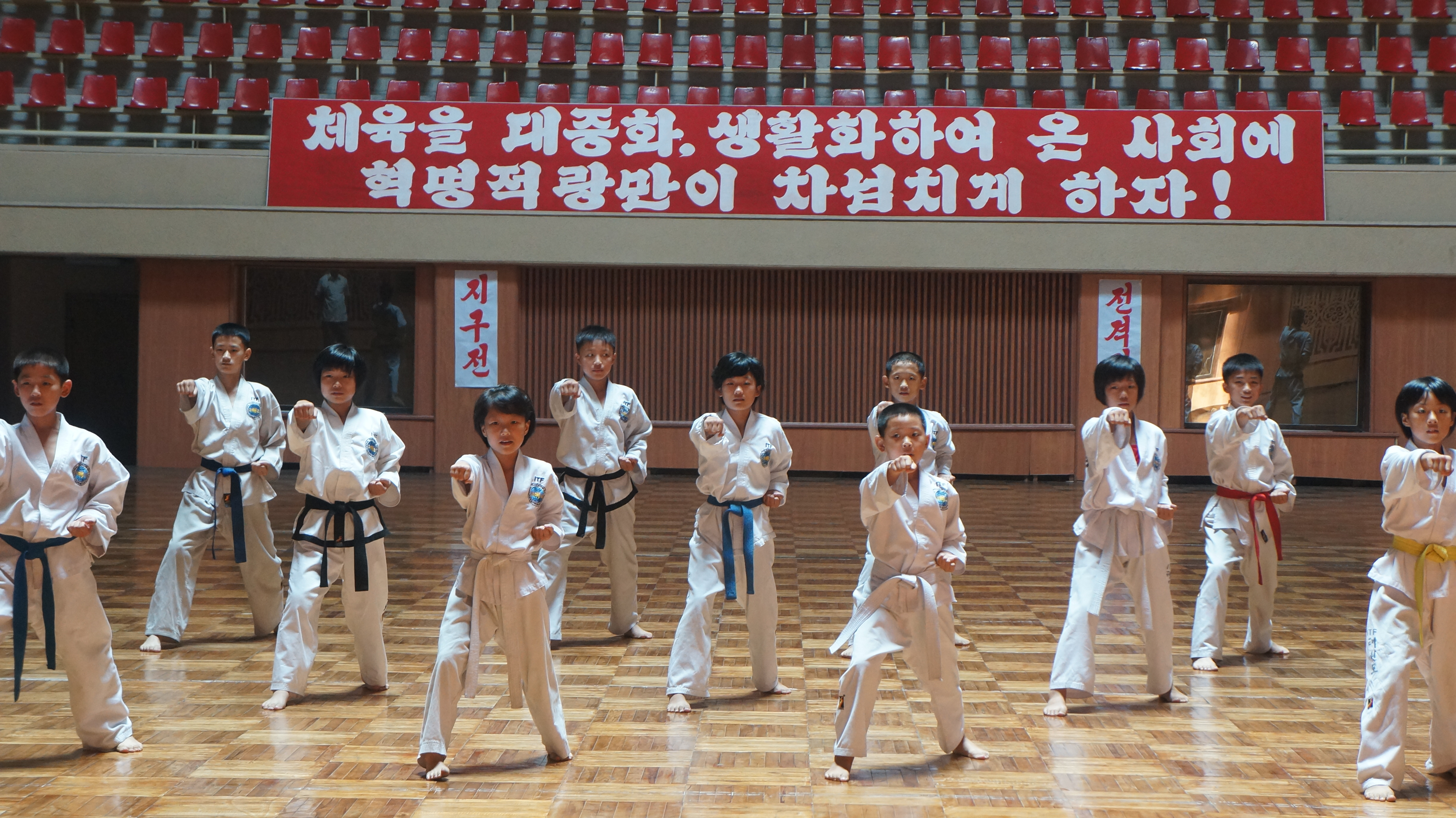
- Demonstration of Dan-Gun in Pyongyang, North Korea.

Korean name
- Hangul: 틀
- Lit.: Pattern
- RR: teul
- MR: t'ŭl

A teul or tul (Note: Both teul and tul are used to describe these patterns; the latter is the name used to refer by ITF.) (Korean: 틀; lit. 'pattern', Korean pronunciation: [tʰɯl]) is a detailed choreographed pattern of Taekwon-Do movements, defined by the International Taekwon-Do Federation. Teul resemble combat, but are essentially non-combative in nature and serve to practice techniques and stances. There are 24 teul, three beginners exercises, and two former teul.

Each pattern has a fixed set of movements and is associated with a geup or dan degree, at which Taekwon-Do student are first introduced to the pattern. Teul are part of examinations for higher degrees and tournaments.

== Performance ==
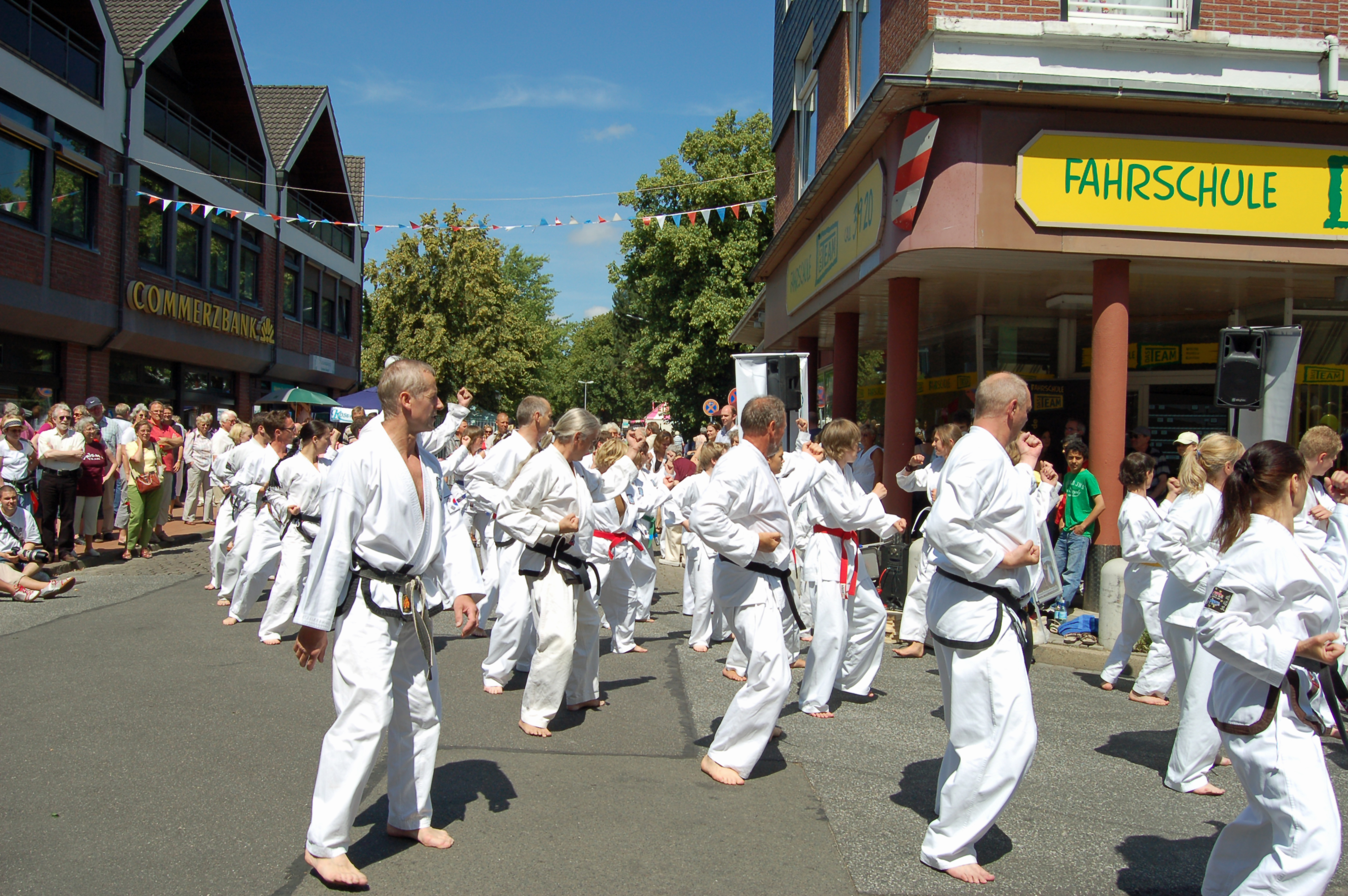
Demonstration of group teul in public

Each pattern has a pre-determined set of movements, as well as a ready stance. This ready stance is the begin and end position of the pattern. When performing a pattern, the student stands in the ready stance and waits for instructions from their teacher to start the performance. Upon receiving these, the student starts performing each movement in the pre-determined order, using sine wave and accentuated breathing. At the end of the performance, the students says the pattern's name out loud and returns to the ready stance upon receiving instructions to do so.

Each movement in a teul has a stance, weapon, type of technique, height, and motion, as well as optional specifications. These are all described in Taekwon-Do manuals and practiced in the same way worldwide.

== History ==
Teul have all been designed by general Choi Hong-hi, the founder of Taekwon-Do, in cooperation with various Taekwon-Do pioneers. The patterns are based on kata from karate and were first created in four different eras.

- 1955–1959: The first five patterns were created and were still called hyung. The first pattern was Hwa-Rang (1955), and the other ones created before 1959 were Choong-Moo, Ul-Ji, Sam-Il, and U-Nam.
- 1961–1964: Sixteen new patterns were created right before or during Choi's stay in Malaysia between 1962 and 1964: Chon-Ji, Dan-Gun, Do-San, Won-Hyo, Yul-Gok, Joong-Gun, Toi-Gye, Kwang-Gae, Po-Eun, Ko-Dang, Choong-Jang, Choi-Yong, Yoo-Sin, Se-Jong, and Tong-Il. In the meantime, hyung were renamed to teul, and U-Nam was removed from the curriculum for political reasons. In total, Taekwon-Do had 20 teul when Choi published his first English-language Taekwon-Do book, titled Taekwon-Do: The Art of Self-Defence. The Taekwon-Do pioneers that helped general Choi develop these patterns were Nam Tae Hi, Han Cha Kyo, Choi Chang Keun, Park Won Ha, Woo Jae Lim, Kim Bok Man and Cho Sang Min.
- 1968: Four final patterns were added: Eui-Am, Yon-Gae, Moon-Moo, and So-San, designed by general Choi and Kim J.C., Park Jong Soo, and Lee Byung Moo.
- 1981–1983: Ko-Dang was removed from the curriculum and replaced by Juche for political reasons. Park Jung Tae, likely assisted by Choi Jung Hwa (General Choi's son), Michael McCormack (General Choi's son-in-law) and Lim Won Sup, is credited with developing Juche.

Each pattern was created based on a set of principles set out by general Choi Hong-hi. These include that every technique was designed to produce maximum power, that the purpose of each technique is clear, that the pattern can be learned by anyone, and that each movement in a pattern expresses the personality of he person it is named after.

== List of teul ==
There are 24 teul that are included in the curriculum of the International Taekwon-Do Federation. Besides these 24 patterns, there are two patterns that were previously practiced, but –to various degrees– do not form part of ITF Taekwon-Do anymore.

Nr.	Name (RR)	Name (Hangul)	Degree	Created	Movements	Meaning
1	Chon-Ji	천지	9th geup	1962–1964	19	Heaven and earth
2	Dan-Gun	단군	8th geup	1962–1964	21	Dangun
3	Do-San	도산	7th geup	1962–1964	24	Ahn Changho
4	Won-Hyo	원효	6th geup	1962–1964	28	Wonhyo
5	Yul-Gok	율곡	5th geup	1962–1964	38	Yi I
6	Joong-Gun	중근	4th geup	1962–1964	32	An Junggeun
7	Toi-Gye	퇴계	3rd geup	1962–1964	37	Yi Hwang
8	Hwa-Rang	화랑	2nd geup	1955	29	Hwarang
9	Choong-Moo	충무	1st geup	1955	30	Yi Sunsin
10	Kwang-Gae	광개	1st dan	1962–1964	39	Gwanggaeto of Goguryeo
11	Po-Eun	포은	1st dan	1962–1964	36	Jeong Mongju
12	Ge-Baek	계백	1st dan	1961	44	Gyebaek
13	Eui-Am	의암	2nd dan	1968	45	Son Byeonghui
14	Choong-Jang	충장	2nd dan	1962–1964	52	Kim Deokryeong
15	Juche	주체	2nd dan	1981–1983	45	Juche
16	Sam-Il	삼일	3rd dan	1955–1959	33	March First Movement
17	Yoo-Sin	유신	3rd dan	1962–1964	68	Kim Yusin
18	Choi-Yong	최영	3rd dan	1962–1964	46	Choe Yeong
19	Yon-Gae	연개	4th dan	1968	49	Yeon Gaesomun
20	Ul-Ji	을지	4th dan	1957	42	Eulji Mundeok
21	Moon-Moo	문무	4th dan	1968	61	Munmu of Silla
22	So-San	서산	5th dan	1968	72	Hyujeong
23	Se-Jong	세종	5th dan	1962–1964	24	Sejong of Joseon
24	Tong-Il	창헌	6th dan	1962–1964	56	Korean reunification
-	Ko-Dang (Note: Go-Dang was replaced by Juche as the 15th teul of ITF Taekwon-Do in the early 1980s. However, some schools still practise Go-Dang due to the controversial background related to Juche.)	고당	-	1962–1964	39	Jo Mansik
-	U-Nam (Note: U-Nam was included in the earliest Taekwon-Do encyclopedias, but was never made official and disappeared from text books in the 1960s.)	우남	-	1955	42	Syngman Rhee

=== Periods ===
Each pattern is named after a person, concept, or event relevant to Korean history, ranging from before the Three Kingdoms of Korea to the post-Korean War era. Together, the set of 24 patterns is meant to represent the entirety of Korean history and explain some of the most important events.

- Ancient Korea (–57 BC): Chon-Ji, Dan-Gun
- Three Kingdoms of Korea (57 BC–668 AD)
  - Kingdom of Silla: Hwa-Rang, Yoo-Sin, Moon-Moo
  - Kingdom of Goguryeo: Kwang-Gae, Yon-Gae, Ul-Ji
  - Kingdom of Baekje: Ge-Baek
- Unified Silla (668–935): Won-Hyo
- Goryeo dynasty (918–1392): Po-Eun, Choi-Yong
- Joseon dynasty (1392–1897): Yul-Gok, Toi-Gye, Choong-Moo, Choong-Jang, So-San, Se-Jong
- Korean Empire (1897–1910): Joong-Gun
- Korea under Japanese rule (1910–1945): Do-San, Eui-Am, Sam-Il, Ko-Dang
- Division of Korea (1945–): Juche, Tong-Il, U-Nam

In some cases, persons after whom a pattern was named knew each other, such as Yi I and Yi Hwang, or Ahn Chang Ho and An Jung Geun.

=== Saju ===
Next to the 24 teul, there are three saju (Korean: 사주; lit. 'four-way'), beginners exercises to prepare Taekwon-Do students for teul. These exercises consist of four repetitions of one or two techniques in all four cardinal directions, performed clockwise and counter-clockwise. While in theory, saju can be created based on any combination of techniques, but only three saju have been created by general Choi Honghi, which are still practised by ITF Taekwon-Do students. The saju are named after their main or only technique.

Name (RR)	Name (Hangul)	Degree	Movements	Meaning
Saju jirugi	사주지르기	10th geup	14	Four-way punch
Saju makgi	사주막기	10th geup	16	Four-way block
Saju tulgi	사주뚫기	2nd geup	8	Four-way thrust

== Competition ==
Teul are part of Taekwon-Do tournaments, in which either two individuals or two groups of five individuals each demonstrate the same pattern simultaneously. After demonstrating the pattern, referees award points to each competitor based on technical precision, power, balance, breath control, and rhythm. The winner advances to the next round in a knock-out system. The performance of a pattern in a tournament includes pre-determined greeting procedures.

== Practice instructions ==
In the Encyclopedia of Taekwon-Do (1999), General Choi Hong-hi phrased nine points that should be taken into account by all Taekwon-Do students when performing teul.

1. Pattern should begin and end at exactly the same spot. This will indicate the performer's accuracy.
2. Correct posture and facing must be maintained at all times.
3. Muscles of the body should be either tensed or relaxed at the proper critical moments in the exercise.
4. The exercise should be performed in a rhythmic movement with an absence of stiffness.
5. Movements should be accelerated or decelerated according to the instructions in this book.
6. Each pattern should be perfected before moving to the next.
7. Students should know the purpose of each movement.
8. Students should perform each movement with realism.
9. Attack and defense techniques should be equally distributed among right and left hands and feet.

== See also ==
- Korean martial arts
- Kata
- Hyeong
- Taegeuk
