= Ul-Ji (teul) =

Twentieth ITF Taekwon-Do pattern

20. Ul-Ji
을지
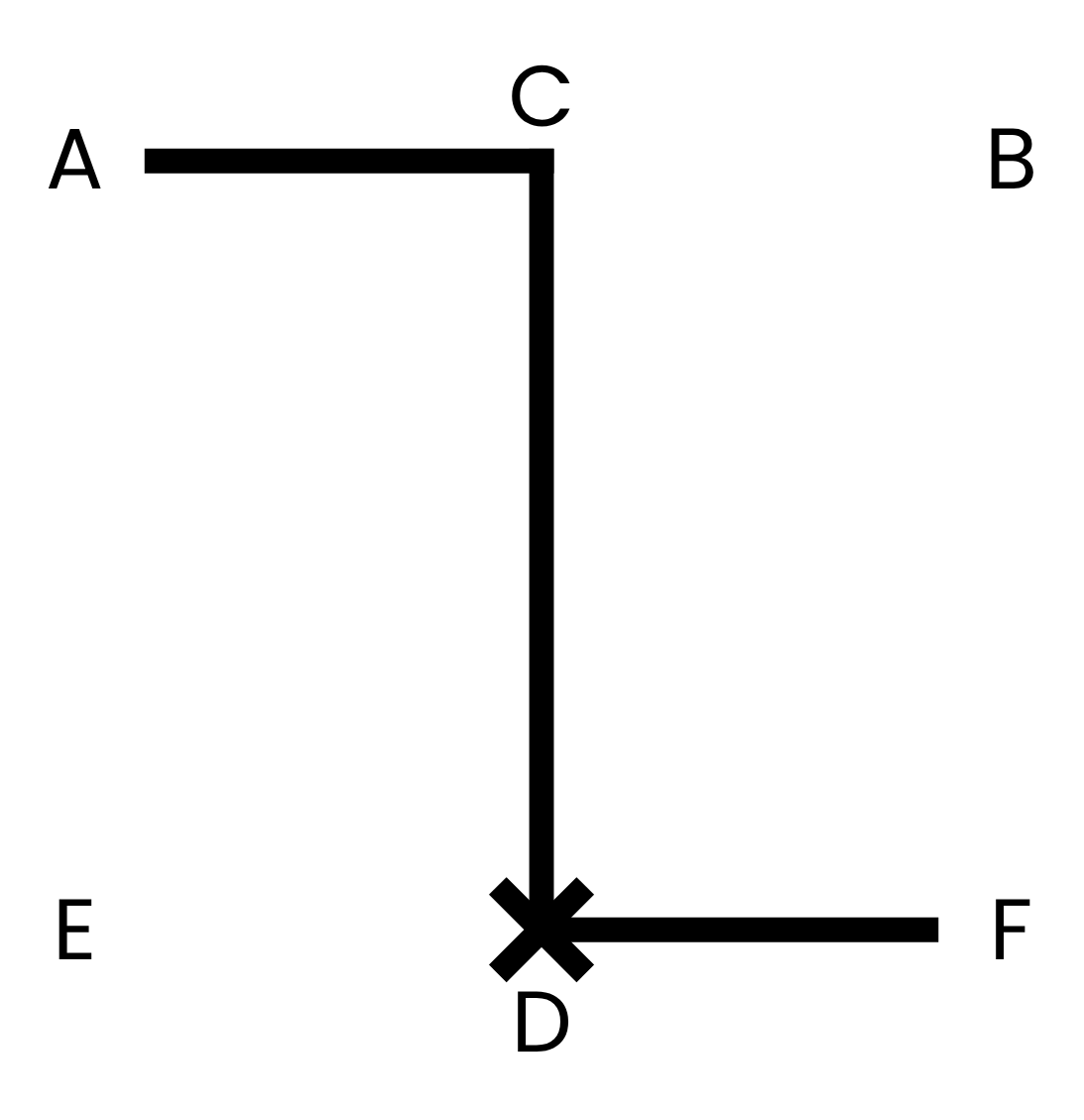
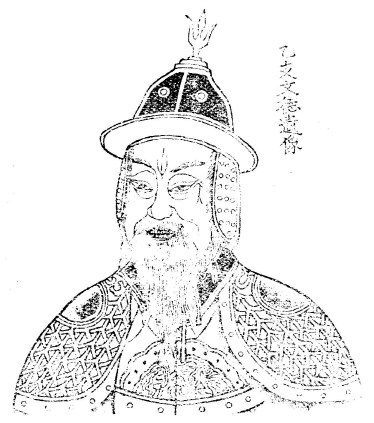
- Diagram of Ul-Ji Eulji Mundeok
- Movements: 42
- Begin stance: Parallel stance with X back hand
- Return foot: Left
- Meaning: Eulji Mundeok
- Associated dan: 4th

Ul-Ji (Korean: 을지; RR: Eulji, Korean pronunciation: [ɯl.tɕi]) is the twentieth Taekwon-Do teul, as defined by the International Taekwon-Do Federation. The pattern consists of 42 movements and is taught to students with the 4th dan (black belt) and necessary to know to obtain the 5th dan.

== Meaning ==
The pattern is named after Eulji Mundeok, a military leader of Goguryeo during the early 7th century. Eulji is best known for leading the resistance against the Sui dynasty, in particular his overwhelming victory in the Battle of Salsu in 612, despite having a considerably smaller army. He was also a poet, and his work Eulji Mundeok hansi is one of the oldest surviving poems in Korean literature.

=== Number of movements ===
It has been believed that the 42 movements of Ul-Ji refer to the age at which general Choi Hong-hi designed the pattern, but he was 38 or 39 at this moment, as the pattern was created in 1957. Instead, Choi was 42 years old when he published his first book on Taekwon-Do in 1959, which included Ul-Ji.

== Movements ==
Nr.	English description	Korean description (in Hangul)	Korean description (in Revised Romanisation)
	Parallel ready stance with X back hand	란히교차손등서기	narani gyocha sondeung seogi
1	Move the left foot to C forming a right walking stance toward D while executing a horizontal strike with twin side fists.	걷는서쌍옆주먹수평때리기	geonneun seo ssang yeop jumeok supyeong ttaerigi
2	Move the right foot to C to form a left walking stance toward D while executing a pressing block with an X-fist.	걷는서교차주먹눌러막기	geonneun seo gyocha jumeok nulleo makgi
3	Execute a rising block with an X-knife-hand while maintaining a left walking stance toward D. Perform 2 and 3 in a continuous motion.	걷는서교차손칼추켜막기, 계속동작	geonneun seo gyocha sonkal chukyeo makgi, gyesok dongjak
4	Execute a high front strike to D with the right knife-hand bringing the left palm on the right elbow joint while maintaining a left walking stance toward D.	걷는서손칼데옆때반대앞때리기	geonneun seo sonkal de yeop ttae bandae ap ttaerigi
5	Move the left foot to C to form a sitting stance toward B while executing a horizontal strike to C with the left back hand.	앉는서손등수평때리기	anneun seo sondeung supyeong ttaerigi
6	Execute a middle crescent kick to the left palm with the right foot.	가운데반달차기	gaunde bandal chagi
7	Lower the right foot to C, forming a sitting stance toward A while striking the left palm with the right front elbow.	앉는서앞팔굽때리기	anneun seo ap palgup ttaerigi
8	Thrust to B with the left back elbow placing the right side fist on the left fist while maintaining a sitting stance toward A.	앉는서뒷팔굽뚫기	anneun seo dwit palgup ttulki
9	Execute a side back strike to B with the right back fist and extending the left arm to the side-downward while maintaining a sitting stance toward A.	앉는서등주먹옆뒷때리기	anneun seo deung jumeok yeop dwit ttaerigi
10	Bring the left foot to the right foot, forming a close stance toward D, at the same time thrusting with a twin side elbow.	모아서쌍옆팔굽뚫기	moa seo ssang yeop palgup ttulki
11	Cross the left foot to the right foot, forming a close stance toward D while turning the face to A, Keeping the position of the hands as they were in 10. Perform in a fast motion.	겨차서기, 빠른동작	gyeocha seogi, ppareun dongjak
12	Execute a middle side piercing kick to A with the right foot keeping the position of the hands as they were in 11.	가운데옆차지르기	gaunde yeop cha jireugi
13	Lower the right foot to A, and then cross the left foot over the right foot, forming a right X-stance toward D while executing a horizontal thrust with a twin elbow.	겨차서쌍팔굽수평뚫기	gyeocha seo ssang palgup supyeong ttulki
14	Move the right foot to A to form the sitting stance toward D while executing a right horizontal punch to A.	앉는서수평지르기	anneun seo supyeong jireugi
15	Execute a high front strike to D with right knife-hand, bringing the left back hand in front of the forehead while standing up toward D.	손칼데옆때앞때리기	sonkal de yeop ttae ap ttaerigi
16	Execute a twin knife-hand block to B while forming a right L-stance toward B, pivoting with the right foot.	ㄴ자서쌍손칼막기	nieunja seo ssang sonkal makgi
17	Jump to execute a mid-air kick to B with the right foot while spinning clockwise.	뛰어돌며차기	ttwieo dolmyeo chagi
18	Land to B forming a right walking stance toward B while executing a middle block to B with the right double forearm.	걷는서두팔목가운데막기	geonneun seo du palmok gaunde makgi
19	Bring the left foot to the right foot to form a closed ready stance B toward D.	모아준비서기	moa junbi seogi
20	Jump to D forming a right X-stance toward BD while executing a high side strike to B with the right back fist bringing the left finger belly to the right side fist.	뛰며겨차서등주먹높은데옆때리기	ttwimyeo gyeocha seo deung jumeok nopeunde yeop ttaerigi
21	Move the left foot to C to form a right walking stance toward D while executing a rising block with the left forearm.	걷는서반대추켜막기	geonneun seo bandae chukyeo makgi
22	Execute a middle front snap kick to D with the left foot keeping the position of the hands as they were in 21.	가운데앞차부시기	gaunde ap cha busigi
23	Lower the left foot to D forming a left walking stance toward D while executing a high punch to D with the right fist.	걷는서높은데반대앞지르기	geonneun seo nopeunde bandae ap jireugi
24	Move the right foot to D to form a right walking stance toward D while executing a middle thrust to D with the right straight fingertip.	걷는서선손끝뚫기	geonneun seo seonsonkkeut ttulki
25	Move the left foot to D turning counter-clockwise to form a sitting stance toward A while executing a high side strike to D with the left back fist.	앉는서등주먹높은데옆때리기	anneun seo deung jumeok nopeunde yeop ttaerigi
26	Move the right foot to F turning counter-clockwise to form a right walking ready stance toward F.	걷는준비서기	geonneun junbi seogi
27	Jump to execute a flying high kick to F with the right foot.	뛰며높이차기	ttwimyeo nopi chagi
28	Land to F to form a right fixed stance toward F while executing a checking block to F with an X-knife hand.	고정서교차손칼멈춰막기	gojeong seo gyocha sonkal meomchwo makgi
29	Move the left foot to F forming a right L-stance toward F while executing a pressing block with an X-fist.	ㄴ자서교차주먹눌러막기	nieunja seo gyocha jumeok nulleo makgi
30	Execute a middle side front snap kick to F with the left foot while executing a middle wedging block with the inner forearm.	가운데옆앞차부시기, 안팔목가운데헤쳐막기	gaunde yeop ap cha busigi, an palmok gaunde hechyeo makgi
31	Lower the left foot to F forming a left walking stance toward F while executing a high vertical punch to F with a twin fist.	걷는서쌍주먹높은데세워지르기	geonneun seo ssang jumeok nopeunde sewo jireugi
32	Move the right foot to F to form a right fixed stance toward F while executing a middle outward block with the right knife hand and a middle pushing block with the left palm.	고정서손칼가은데옆막기손바닥밀어막기	gojeong seo sonkal gaunde yeop makgi sonbadak mireo makgi
33	Slide to F forming a right L-stance toward F while executing a middle punch to F with the left fist.	미끌며ㄴ자서반대지르기	mikkeulmyeo nieunja seo bandae jireugi
34	Move the left foot to the side rear of the right foot and the right foot to E to form a right L-stance toward F and then jump to E maintaining a right L-stance towards F while executing a middle guarding block to F with the forearm.	이보옮겨디디며들어오기ㄴ자서기, 뛰며ㄴ자서대비막기	ibo olgyeo didimyeo deureogi nieunja seogi, ttwimyeo nieunja seo daebi makgi
35	Execute a middle turning kick to DF with the right foot.	가운데돌려차기	gaunde dollyeo chagi
36	Lower the right foot to F and then execute a middle back piercing kick to F with the left foot.	가운데뒷차지르기	gaunde dwitcha jireugi
37	Lower the left foot to F to form a right L-stance toward F while executing a middle guarding block to F with the forearm.	ㄴ자서대비막기	nieunja seo daebi makgi
38	Move the left foot to E forming a left l-stance toward F while executing an upward block to F with the right palm.	ㄴ자서손바닥올려막기	nieunja seo sonbadak ollyeo makgi
39	Move the right foot to E forming a right walking stance to E while executing a circular block to ED with the left inner forearm.	걷는서안팔목돌리며막기	geonneun seo an palmok dollimyeo makgi
40	Execute a circular block to DE with the right inner forearm while forming a right walking stance toward DF.	걷는서안팔목돌리며막기	geonneun seo an palmok dollimyeo makgi
41	Move the left foot on line EF to form a sitting stance toward D while executing a middle punch to D with the left fist.	앉는서앞지르기	anneun seo ap jireugi
42	Execute a middle punch to D with the right fist while maintaining a sitting stance toward D.	앉는서앞지르기	anneun seo ap jireugi
	Move the left foot to the parallel ready stance with X back hand facing D.	란히교차손등서기	narani gyocha sondeung seogi

== Trivia ==
- Ul-Ji is one of the patterns that refers to the Kingdom of Goguryeo, next to Kwang-Gae and Yon-Gae.
