= Kwang-Gae (teul) =

Tenth ITF Taekwon-Do pattern

10. Kwang-Gae
광개
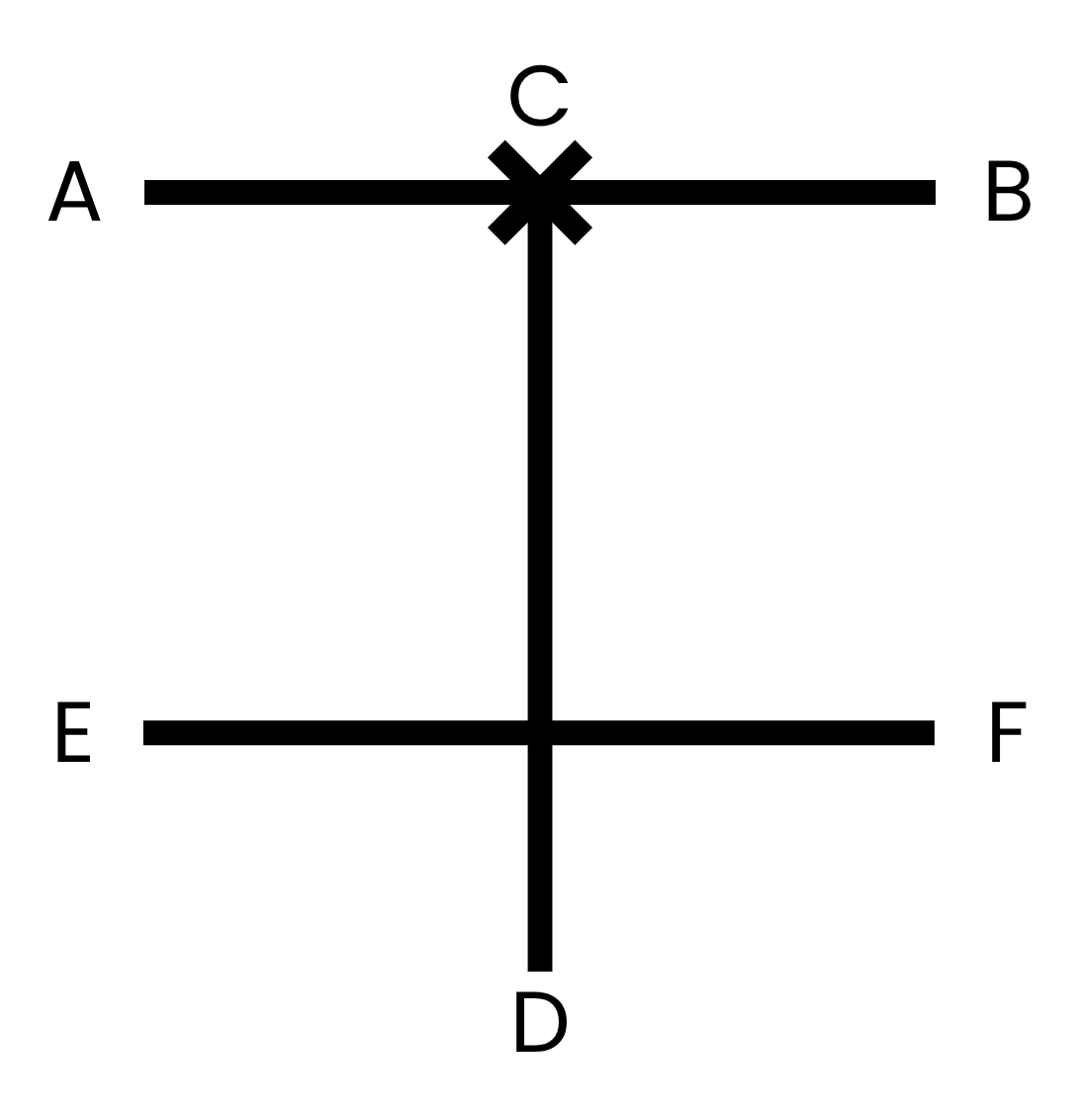
- Diagram of Gwang-Gae teul. Diagram of Kwang-Gae teul
- Movements: 39
- Begin stance: Parallel ready stance with heaven hand
- Return foot: Left
- Meaning: Gwanggaeto
- Associated dan: 1st

Kwang-Gae (Korean: 광개; RR: Gwanggae, Korean pronunciation: [kwaŋ.kɛ]) is the tenth Taekwon-Do teul, as defined by the International Taekwon-Do Federation. The pattern consists of 39 movements and is taught to students with the 1st dan (black belt) and necessary to know to obtain the 2nd dan.

== Meaning ==
The pattern is named after Gwanggaeto the Great, the 19th King of Goguryeo and lived in the 4th and 5th centuries AD. Under the reign of Gwanggaeto, Goguryeo became one of the great powers in East Asia and conquered lands in contemporary Manchuria, Inner Mongolia, and Primorsky Krai. Meanwhile, Gwanggaeto defeated Baekje, the then most powerful of the Three Kingdoms of Korea.

=== Number of movements ===
The 39 movements of Kwang-Gae refer to the first two numbers of the year Gwanggaeto was proclaimed King of Goguryeo, in 391 AD. He also passed away aged 39.

== Movements ==
Nr.	English description	Korean description (in Hangul)	Korean description (in Revised Romanisation)
	Parallel ready stance with heaven hand facing D	나란히하늘손준비서기	narani haneulson junbi seogi
1	Bring the left foot to the right to form a closed ready stance B, bringing the hands together in a circular motion.	모아준비서기	moa junbi seogi
2	Move the left foot to D, forming a left walking stance toward D while executing an upset punch to D with the right fist. Perform in a slow motion.	걷는서뒤집어지르기, 느린동작	geonneun seo dwijibeo jireugi, neurin dongjak
3	Move the right foot to D, forming a right walking stance toward D while executing an upset punch to D with the left fist. Perform in slow motion.	걷는서뒤집어지르기, 느린동작	geonneun seo dwijibeo jireugi, neurin dongjak
4	Move the left foot to the side front of the right foot, and then move the right foot to D, forming a right walking stance toward D, at the same time executing a high hooking block to D with the right palm.	이보옮겨디디며나가기걷는서손바닥데옆때걸쳐막기	ibo omgyeo didimyeo nagagi geonneun seo sonbadak de yeop ttae geolchyeo makgi
5	Move the right foot to C in a sliding motion to form a right L-stance to D, at the same time executing a low guarding block to D with a knife-hand.	미끌며ㄴ자서손칼낮은데대비막기	mikkeulmyeo nieunja seo sonkal najeunde daebi makgi
6	Move the right foot to the side front of the left foot and then move the left foot to D, forming a left walking stance toward D while executing a high hooking block to D with the left palm.	이보옮겨디디며나가기걷는서손바닥데옆때걸쳐막기	ibo omgyeo didimyeo nagagi geonneun seo sonbadak de yeop ttae geolchyeo makgi
7	Move the left foot to C in a sliding motion forming a left L-stance toward D while executing a low guarding block to D with a knife-hand.	미끌며ㄴ자서손칼낮은데대비막기	mikkeulmyeo nieunja seo sonkal najeunde daebi makgi
8	Move the left foot to D, forming a right rear foot stance toward D while executing a high guarding block to D with a knife-hand.	뒷발서손칼데옆때대비막기	dwitbal seo sonkal de yeop ttae daebi makgi
9	Move the right foot to D, forming a left rear foot stance toward D while executing a high guarding block to D with a knife-hand.	뒷발서손칼데옆때대비막기	dwitbal seo sonkal de yeop ttae daebi makgi
10	Move the left foot to the side front of the right foot and then turn anti-clockwise, pivoting with the left foot, to form a left walking stance toward C while executing an upward block to C with the right palm. Perform in a slow motion.	이보옮겨디디며돌기걷는서손바닥올려막기, 느린동작	ibo olgyeo didimyeo dolgi geonneun seosonbadak ollyeo makgi, neurin dongjak
11	Move the right foot to C, forming a right walking stance toward C while executing an upward block to C with the left palm. Perform in a slow motion.	걷는서손바닥올려막기, 느린동작	geonneun seosonbadak ollyeo makgi, neurin dongjak
12	Execute a low front block with the right knife-hand in a circular motion, hitting the left palm while bringing the left foot to the right foot to form a closed stance toward C.	모아서손칼낮은데앞막기	moa seo sonkal najeunde ap makgi
13	Execute a pressing kick to E with the left foot, keeping the position of the hands as they were in movement 12.	밖으로눌러차기	bakkeuro nulleo chagi
14	Execute a middle side piercing kick to E with the left foot, keeping the position of the hands as they were in movement 13. Perform 13 and 14 in a consecutive kick.	가운데옆차지르기, 차례차례동작	gaunde yeop cha jireugi, charye charye dongjak
15	Lower the left foot to E, forming a right L-stance toward E while executing a high inward strike to E with the right knife-hand and bringing the left side fist in front of the right shoulder.	ㄴ자서손칼높은데안으로때리기	nieunja seo sonkal nopeunde aneuro ttaerigi
16	Execute a downward strike to E with the left side fist while forming a closed stance toward C, pulling the left foot to the right foot.	모아서옆주먹내려때리기	moa seo yeop jumeok naeryeo ttaerigi
17	Execute a pressing kick to F with the right foot, keeping the position of the hands as they were in movement 16.	밖으로눌러차기	bakkeuro nulleo chagi
18	Execute a middle side piercing kick to F with the right foot, keeping the position of the hands as they were in movement 17. Perform 17 and 18 in a consecutive kick.	가운데옆차지르기, 차례차례동작	gaunde yeop cha jireugi, charye charye dongjak
19	Lower the right foot to F, forming a left L-stance toward F while executing a high inward strike to F with the knife-hand and bringing the right side fist in front of the left shoulder.	ㄴ자서손칼높은데안으로때리기	nieunja seo sonkal nopeunde aneuro ttaerigi
20	Execute a downward strike to F with the right side fist while forming a closed stance toward C, pulling the right foot to the left foot.	모아서옆주먹내려때리기	moa seo yeop jumeok naeryeo ttaerigi
21	Move the left foot to C, forming a left low stance toward C while executing a pressing block with the right palm. Perform in slow motion.	낮춰서손바닥눌러막기, 느린동작	natchwo seo sonbadak nulleo makgi, neurin dongjak
22	Move the right foot to C, forming a right low stance toward C while executing a pressing block with the left palm. Perform in a slow motion.	낮춰서손바닥눌러막기, 느린동작	natchwo seo sonbadak nulleo makgi, neurin dongjak
23	Move the right foot to D in a stamping motion to form a sitting stance toward F while executing a high side strike to D with the right back fist.	구르며앉는서등주먹높은데옆때리기	gureumyeo anneun seo deung jumeok nopeunde yeop ttaerigi
24	Execute a middle block to D with the right double forearm while forming a right walking stance toward D, pivoting with the left foot.	걷는서두팔목가운데막기	geonneun seo du palmok gaunde makgi
25	Execute a low block to D with the left forearm while shifting to C, maintaining a right walking stance toward D, keeping the position of the right hand as it was in movement 24.	잦은발, 걷는서팔목낮은데반대막기	jajeunbal, geonneun seo palmok najeunde bandae makgi
26	Execute a high thrust to D with the right flat fingertip while forming a right low stance toward D, slipping the right foot to D. Perform in slow motion.	낮춰서엎은손끝높은데뚫기, 느린동작	natchwo seo eopeun sonkkeut nopeunde ttulki, neurin dongjak
27	Move the left foot on line CD in a stamping motion to form a sitting stance to F while executing a high side strike to C with the left back fist.	구르며앉는서등주먹높은데옆때리기	gureumyeo anneun seo deung jumeok nopeunde yeop ttaerigi
28	Execute a middle block to C with the left double forearm while forming a left walking stance toward C, pivoting with the left foot.	걷는서두팔목가운데막기	geonneun seo du palmok gaunde makgi
29	Execute a low reverse block to C with the right forearm while shifting to D, maintaining a left walking stance toward C, keeping the position of the left hand as it was in movement 28.	잦은발, 걷는서팔목낮은데반대막기	jajeunbal, geonneun seo palmok najeunde bandae makgi
30	Execute a high thrust to C with the left flat fingertip while forming a left low stance toward C, slipping the left foot to C.	낮춰서엎은손끝높은데뚫기, 느린동작	natchwo seo eopeun sonkkeut nopeunde ttulki, neurin dongjak
31	Move the right foot to C in a stamping motion, forming a right walking stance toward C while executing a high vertical punch to C with a twin fist.	구르며걷는서쌍주먹높은데세워지르기	gureumyeo geonneun seo ssang jumeok nopeunde sewo jireugi
32	Move the left foot to A in a stamping motion, forming a left walking stance toward A while executing an upset punch to A with a twin fist.	구르며걷는서쌍주먹뒤집어지르기	gureumyeo geonneun seo ssang jumeok dwijibeo jireugi
33	Execute a middle front snap kick to A with the right foot, keeping the position of the hands as they were in movement 32.	가운데앞차부시기	gaunde ap cha busigi
34	Lower the right foot to the left foot, move the left foot to A to form a left L-stance to B while executing a middle knife-hand guarding block to B.	ㄴ자서손칼대비막기	nieunja seo sonkal daebi makgi
35	Move the left foot to B, forming a left walking stance toward B while executing a high punch to B with the left fist.	걷는서높은데앞지르기	geonneun seo nopeunde ap jireugi
36	Move the right foot to B in stamping motion, forming a right walking stance toward B while executing an upset punch to B with a twin fist.	구르며걷는서쌍주먹뒤집어지르기	gureumyeo geonneun seo ssang jumeok dwijibeo jireugi
37	Execute a middle front snap kick to B with the left foot, keeping the position of the hands as they were in movement 36.	가운데앞차부시기	gaunde ap cha busigi
38	Lower the left foot to the right foot, move the right foot to B to form a right L-stance to A, executing a middle knife-hand guarding block to A.	ㄴ자서손칼대비막기	nieunja seo sonkal daebi makgi
39	Move the right foot to A, forming a right walking stance toward A while executing a high punch to A with the right fist.	걷는서높은데앞지르기	geonneun seo nopeunde ap jireugi
	Move the left foot to the parallel ready stance with heaven hand facing D.	나란히하늘손준비서기	narani haneulson junbi seogi

== Trivia ==
- Kwang-Gae is the first pattern taught to Taekwon-Do students who obtained the black belt.
- Kwang-Gae is one of the patterns that refers to the Kingdom of Goguryeo, next to Yon-Gae and Ul-Ji.
