= Po-Eun (teul) =

Eleventh ITF Taekwon-Do pattern

11. Po-Eun
포은
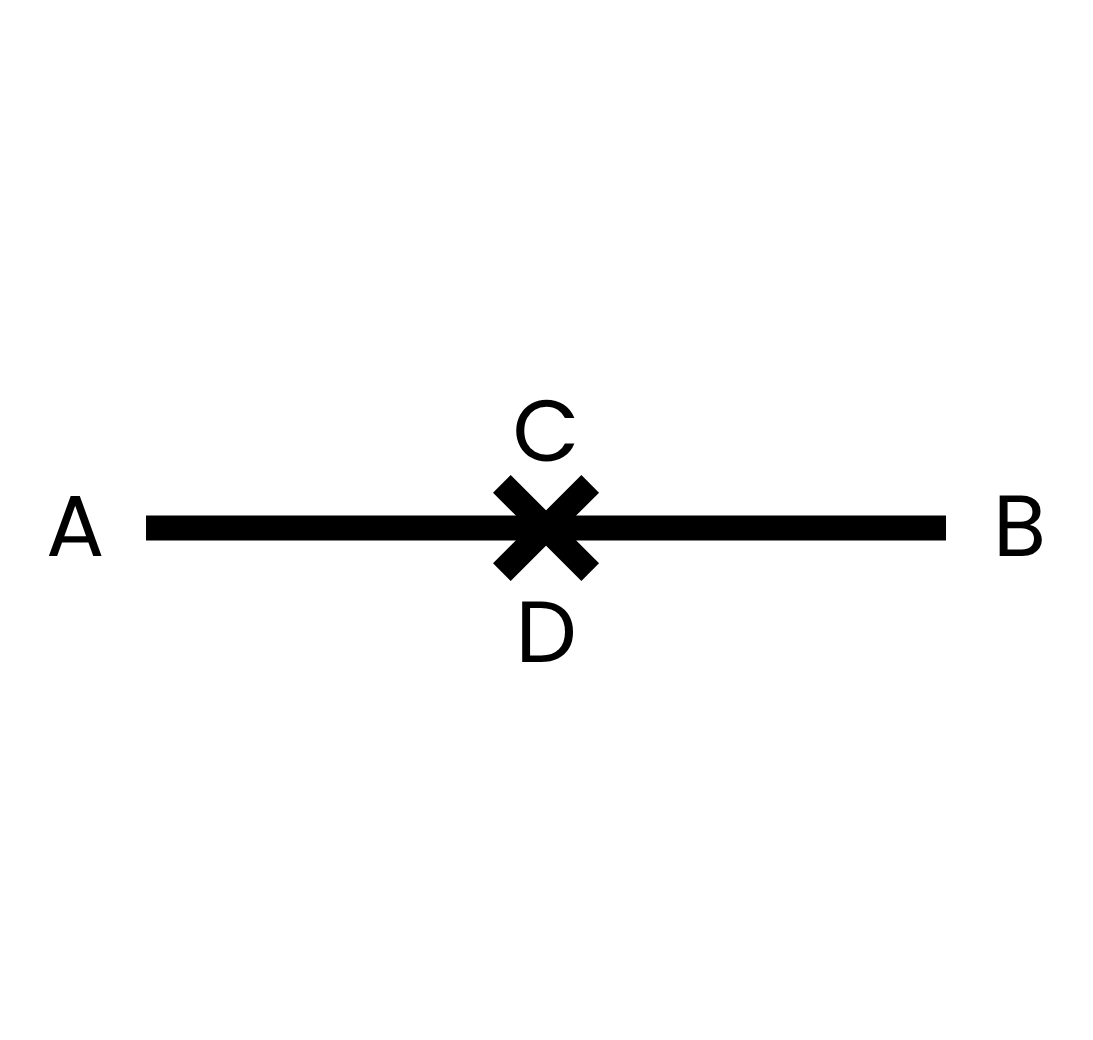
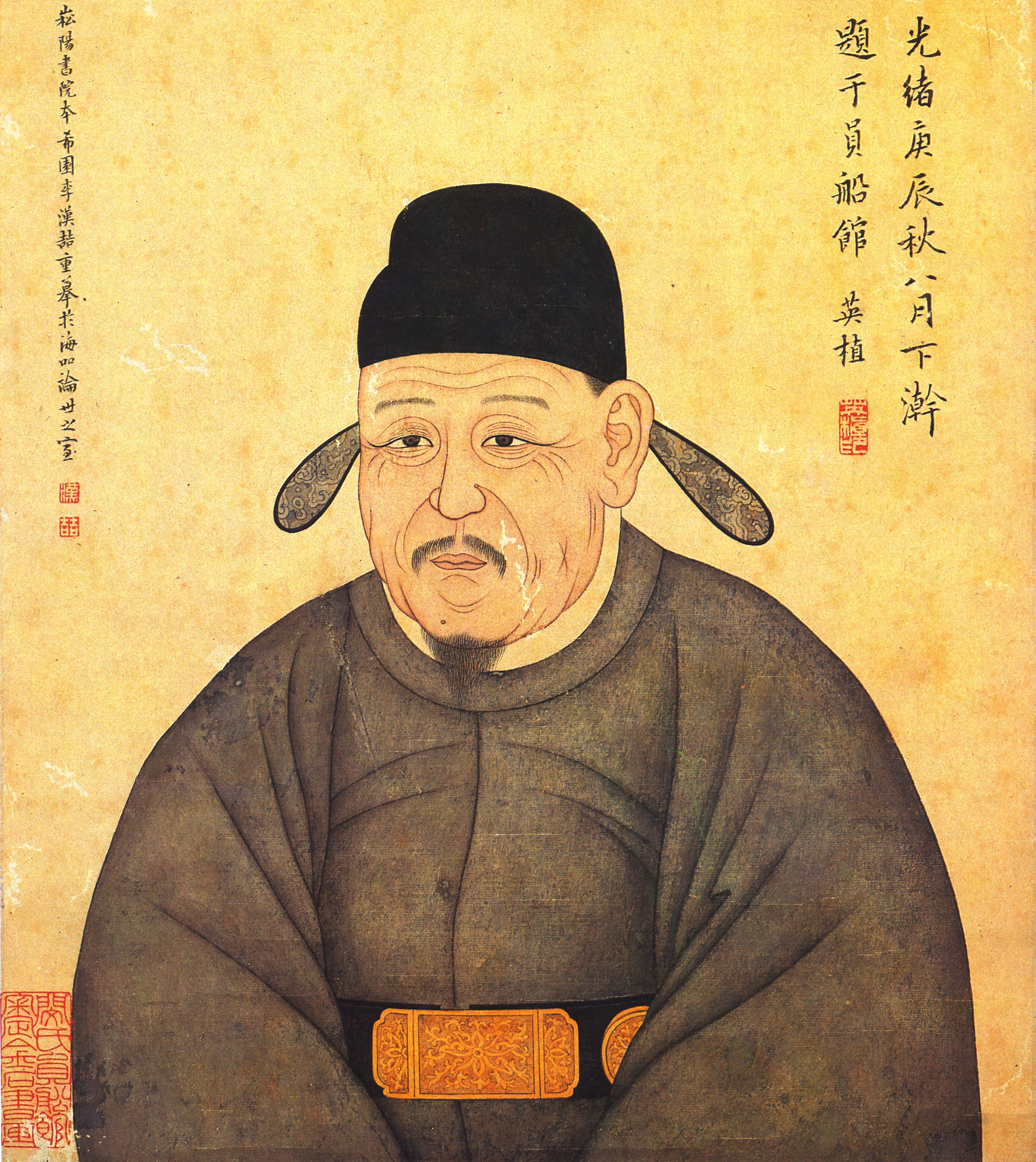
- Diagram of Po-Eun Jeong Mongju
- Movements: 36
- Begin stance: Parallel ready stance with heaven hand
- Return foot: Left
- Meaning: Chŏng Mongju
- Associated dan: 1st

Po-Eun (Korean: 포은; RR: Poeun, Korean pronunciation: [pʰo.ɯn]) is the eleventh Taekwon-Do teul, as defined by the International Taekwon-Do Federation. The pattern consists of 36 movements and is taught to students with the 1st dan (black belt) and necessary to know to obtain the 2nd dan.

== Meaning ==
The pattern is named after Jeong Mongju (pen name Poeun), a statesman, diplomat, philosopher, and poet from the late Goryeo era. He is best known for his opposition to the transition from the Goryeo (918–1392) to Joseon (1392–1897) periods, trying to reform Goryeo to prevent the collapse of the declining kingdom. Jeong's assassination by supporters of the rebel general Yi Seonggye, who would later become the first King of Joseon, was considered the symbolic end of the Goryeo dynasty.

=== Number of movements ===
It is unclear why Po-Eun has 36 movements. It could refer to the age at which Jeong visited China as a diplomatic envoy on behalf of Goryeo.

== Movements ==
Nr.	English description	Korean description (in Hangul)	Korean description (in Revised Romanisation)
	Parallel ready stance with heaven hand facing D	나란히하늘손준비서기	narani haneulson junbi seogi
1	Move the left foot to B, forming a right L-stance toward B while executing a middle guarding block to B with the forearm.	ㄴ자서대비막기	nieunja seo daebi makgi
2	Pull the right foot to the left knee joint to form a left one-leg stance to D, at the same time lifting both fists while turning the face toward A.	외발서기	oebal seogi
3	Execute a pressing kick to A with the right foot keeping the position of the hands as they were in movement 2.	밖으로눌러차기	bakkeuro nulleo chagi
4	Lower the right foot to A to form a sitting stance toward D while executing a middle side strike to A with the right knife-hand.	앉는서손칼옆때리기	anneun seo sonkal yeop ttaerigi
5	Execute an angle punch with the left fist while maintaining a sitting stance toward D.	앉는서ㄱ자지르기	anneun seo nieunja jireugi
6	Execute a pressing block with the left, fore fist while executing a side front block with the right inner forearm, maintaining a sitting stance to D.	앉는서앞주먹눌러막기, 계속동작	anneun seo ap jumeok nulleo makgi, gyesok dongjak
7	Execute a pressing block with the right fore fist and a side front block with the left inner forearm while maintaining a sitting stance toward D.	앉는서앞주먹눌러막기, 계속동작	anneun seo ap jumeok nulleo makgi, gyesok dongjak
8	Execute a middle wedging block with the inner forearm while maintaining a sitting stance toward D.	앉는서안팔목가운데헤쳐막기, 계속동작	anneun seo an palmok gaunde hechyeo makgi, gyesok dongjak
9	Thrust to C with the right back elbow supporting the right forefist with the left palm, keeping the face as it was in 8, in a sitting stance to D.	앉는서뒷팔굽뚫기, 계속동작	anneun seo dwit palgup ttulki, gyesok dongjak
10	Execute a middle punch to D with the right fist slipping the left palm up to the right elbow joint while maintaining a sitting stance toward D.	앉는서앞지르기, 계속동작	anneun seo ap jireugi, gyesok dongjak
11	Thrust to C with the left back elbow supporting the left fore fist with right palm, keeping the face as it was in 10, in a sitting stance toward D.	앉는서뒷팔굽뚫기, 계속동작	anneun seo dwit palgup ttulki, gyesok dongjak
12	Execute a right horizontal punch to A, maintaining a sitting stance to D. Perform 6 through 12 in continuous motion.	앉는서수평지르기, 계속동작	anneun seo supyeong jireugi, gyesok dongjak
13	Cross the left foot over the right foot forming a right X-stance toward D while executing a low front block to D with the right outer forearm and bringing the left finger belly on the right under forearm.	겨차서팔목낮은데앞막기	gyeocha seo palmok najeunde ap makgi
14	Move the right foot to A forming a left L-stance toward A at the same time executing a U-shape grasp to A.	ㄴ자서ㄷ자잡기	nieunja seo digeutja japgi
15	Bring the left foot to the right foot forming a closed stance toward D while executing a horizontal thrust with a twin elbow, turning the face toward B. Perform in slow motion.	모아서쌍팔굽수평뚫기, 느린동작	moa seo ssang palgup supyeong ttulki, neurin dongjak
16	Move the left foot to B to form a sitting stance toward D while executing a side back strike to C with the right back fist and extending the left arm to the side downward.	앉는서등주먹옆뒷때리기	anneun seo deung jumeok yeop dwit ttaerigi
17	Cross the right foot over the left foot forming a left X-stance toward D while executing a low front block with the left outer forearm and bringing the right finger belly to the left side fist.	겨차서팔목낮은데앞막기	gyeocha seo palmok najeunde ap makgi
18	Move the left foot to B to form a sitting stance toward D while executing a low guarding block to B with a reverse knife-hand.	앉는서손칼등낮은데대비막기	anneun seo sonkal deung najeunde daebi makgi
19	Execute a forearm middle guarding block to A while forming a left L-stance toward A pivoting with left foot.	ㄴ자서대비막기	nieunja seo daebi makgi
20	Pull the left foot to the right knee joint to form a right one-leg stance toward D, at the same time lifting both fists while turning the face to B.	외발서기	oebal seogi
21	Execute a pressing kick to B with the left foot keeping the position of the hands as they were in movement 20.	밖으로눌러차기	bakkeuro nulleo chagi
22	Lower the left foot to B to form a sitting stance toward D while executing a middle side strike to B with the left knife-hand.	앉는서손칼옆때리기	anneun seo sonkal yeop ttaerigi
23	Execute an angle punch with the right fist while maintaining a sitting stance toward D.	앉는서ㄱ자지르기	anneun seo nieunja jireugi
24	Execute a pressing block with the right forefist while executing a side front block with the left inner forearm, maintaining a sitting stance to D.	앉는서앞주먹눌러막기, 계속동작	anneun seo ap jumeok nulleo makgi, gyesok dongjak
25	Execute a pressing block with the left forefist and a side front block with the right inner forearm while maintaining a sitting stance toward D.	앉는서앞주먹눌러막기, 계속동작	anneun seo ap jumeok nulleo makgi, gyesok dongjak
26	Execute a middle wedging block with the inner forearm while maintaining a sitting stance toward D.	앉는서안팔목가운데헤쳐막기, 계속동작	anneun seo an palmok gaunde hechyeo makgi, gyesok dongjak
27	Thrust to C with the left back elbow supporting the left forefist with the right palm, keeping the face as it was in 26, in a sitting stance to D.	앉는서뒷팔굽뚫기, 계속동작	anneun seo dwit palgup ttulki, gyesok dongjak
28	Execute a middle punch to D with the left fist slipping the right palm up to the left elbow joint while maintaining a sitting stance toward D.	앉는서앞지르기, 계속동작	anneun seo ap jireugi, gyesok dongjak
29	Thrust to C with the right back elbow supporting the right forefist with left palm, keeping the face as it was in 28, in a sitting stance toward D.	앉는서뒷팔굽뚫기, 계속동작	anneun seo dwit palgup ttulki, gyesok dongjak
30	Execute a left horizontal punch to B, maintaining a sitting stance to D. Perform 24 through 30 in continuous motion.	앉는서수평지르기, 계속동작	anneun seo supyeong jireugi, gyesok dongjak
31	Cross the right foot over the left foot forming a left X-stance toward D while executing a low front block to D with the left outer forearm and bringing the right finger belly on the left under forearm.	겨차서팔목낮은데앞막기	gyeocha seo palmok najeunde ap makgi
32	Move the left foot to B forming a right L-stance toward B at the same time executing a U-shape grasp to B.	ㄴ자서ㄷ자잡기	nieunja seo digeutja japgi
33	Bring the right foot to the left foot forming a closed stance toward D while executing a horizontal thrust with a twin elbow, turning the face toward A. Perform in slow motion.	모아서쌍팔굽수평뚫기, 느린동작	moa seo ssang palgup supyeong ttulki, neurin dongjak
34	Move the right foot to A to form a sitting stance toward D while executing a side back strike to C with the left back fist and extending the right arm to the side downward.	앉는서등주먹옆뒷때리기	anneun seo deung jumeok yeop dwit ttaerigi
35	Cross the left foot over the right foot forming a right X-stance toward D while executing a low front block with the right outer forearm and bringing the left finger belly to the right side fist.	겨차서팔목낮은데앞막기	gyeocha seo palmok najeunde ap makgi
36	Move the right foot to A to form a sitting stance toward D while executing a low guarding block to A with a reverse knife-hand.	앉는서손칼등낮은데대비막기	anneun seo sonkal deung najeunde daebi makgi
	Move the left foot to the parallel ready stance with heaven hand facing D.	나란히하늘손준비서기	narani haneulson junbi seogi

== Trivia ==
- Po-Eun is one of the two patterns referring to the Goryeo period, the other being Choi-Yong.
- The diagram of the pattern (—) is a straight line to symbolize Jeong Mongju's loyalty to his king and country.
