= Yoo-Sin (teul) =

Seventeenth ITF Taekwon-Do pattern

17. Yoo-Sin
유신
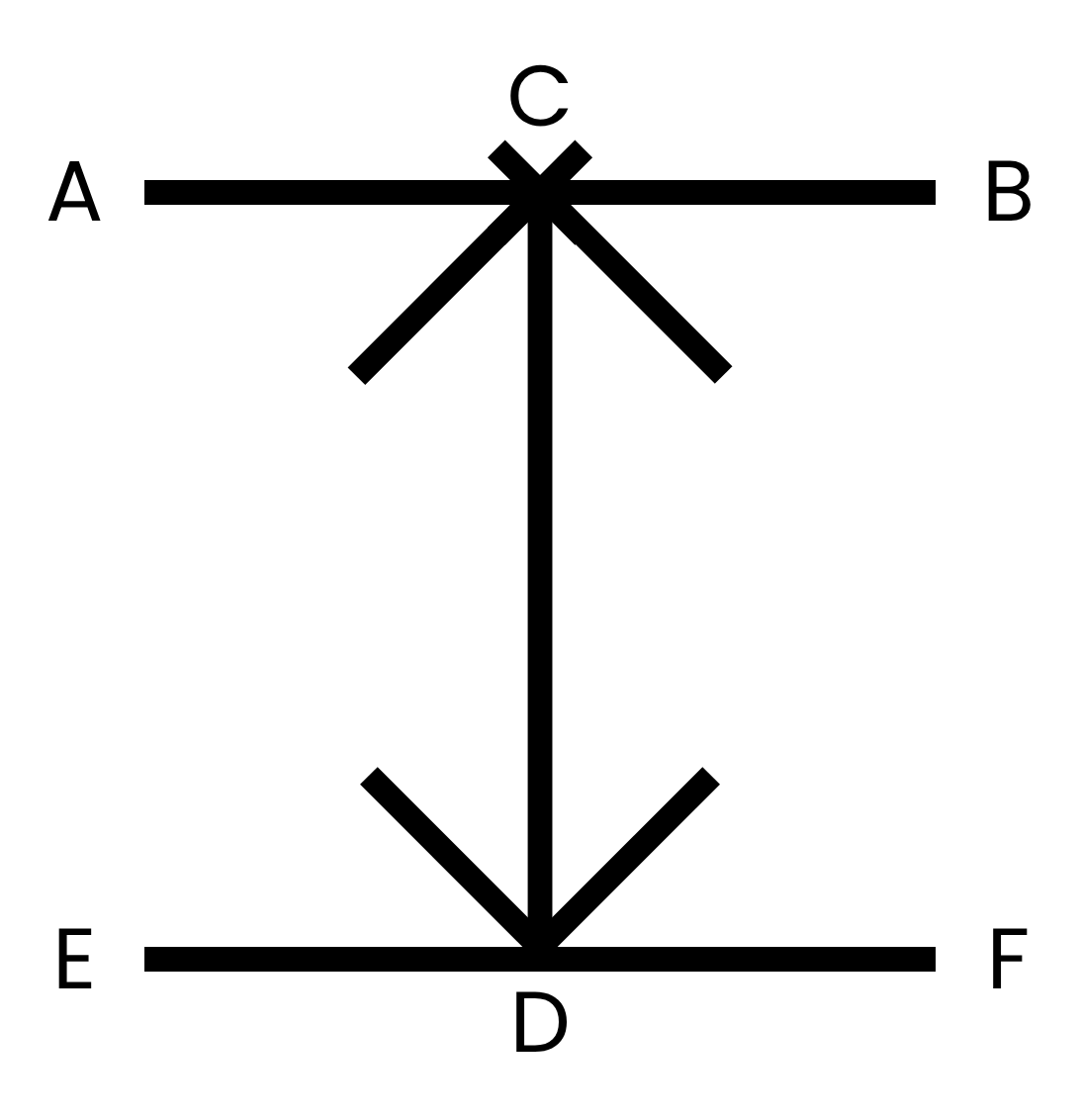
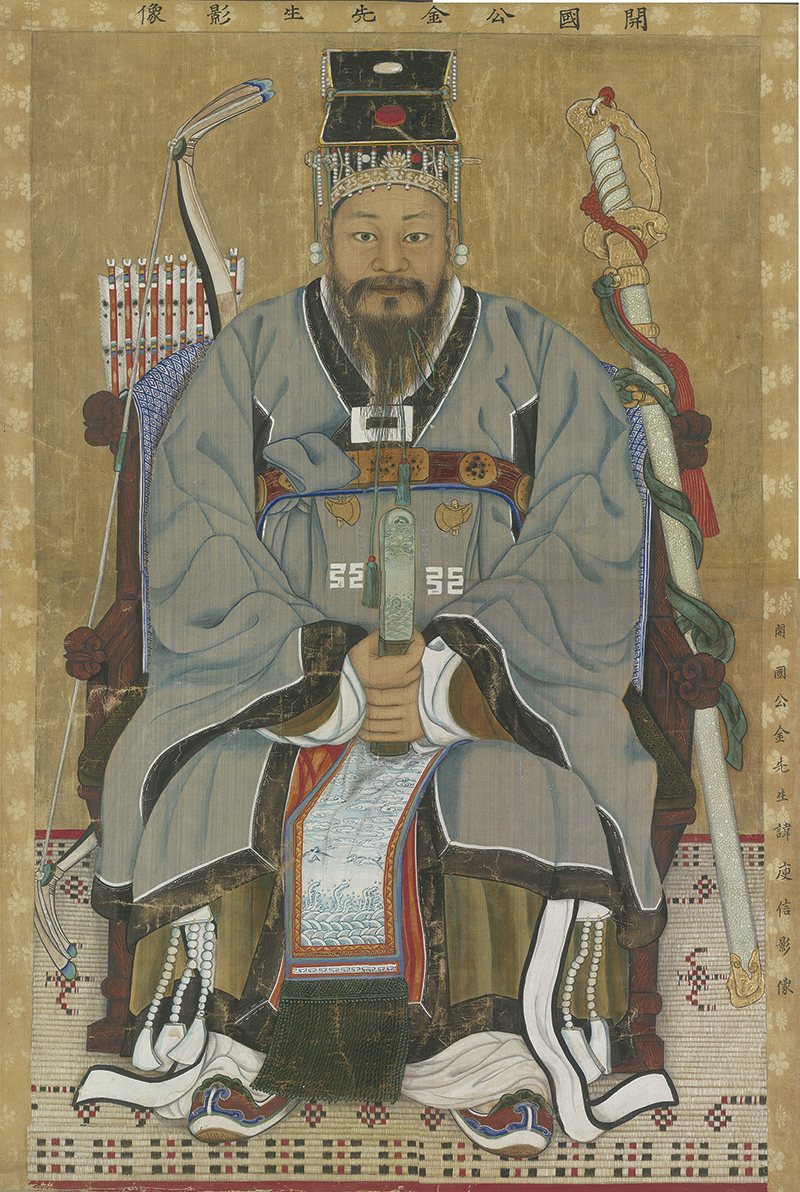
- Diagram of Yoo-Sin Kim Yusin
- Movements: 68
- Begin stance: Warrior ready stance B
- Return foot: Right
- Meaning: Kim Yusin
- Associated dan: 3rd

Yoo-Sin (Korean: 유신; RR: Yusin, Korean pronunciation: [ju.sin]) is the seventeenth Taekwon-Do teul, as defined by the International Taekwon-Do Federation. The pattern consists of 68 movements and is taught to students with the 3rd dan (black belt) and necessary to know to obtain the 4th dan.

== Meaning ==
The pattern is named after Kim Yusin, the general of the Kingdom of Silla who united the Three Kingdoms of Korea in the 7th century. Raised as a Hwarang warrior, Kim became the Commander in Chief of Silla in 629 and is remembered as a courageous and wise leader who was one of the driving forces behind the unification of the Korean kingdoms.

=== Number of movements ===
The 68 movements in Yoo-Sin refer to the last two digits of the year 668, in which Silla, Goguryeo, and Baekje united.

== Movements ==
Nr.	English description	Korean description (in Hangul)	Korean description (in Revised Romanisation)
	Warrior ready stance B facing D	무사준비서기	musa junbi seogi
1	Move the left foot to B to form a sitting stance toward D while extending both elbows to the sides horizontally.	앉는서빼기	anneun seo ppaegi
2	Execute an angle punch to C with the left fist while sliding to A, maintaining a sitting stance toward D.	미끌며앉는서ㄱ자지르기	mikkeulmyeo anneun seo nieunja jireugi
3	Execute an angle punch to C with the right fist while sliding to B, maintaining a sitting stance toward D. Perform 2 and 3 in a fast motion.	미끌며앉는서ㄱ자지르기, 빠른동작	mikkeulmyeo anneun seo nieunja jireugi, ppareun dongjak
4	Execute a middle hooking block to D with the right palm while standing up toward D.	손바닥가운데걸쳐막기	sonbadak gaunde geolchyeo makgi
5	Execute a middle punch to D with the left fist while forming a sitting stance toward D.	앉는서앞지르기	anneun seo ap jireugi
6	Execute a middle hooking block to D with the left palm while standing up toward D.	손바닥가운데걸쳐막기	sonbadak gaunde geolchyeo makgi
7	Execute a middle punch to D with the right fist while forming a sitting stance toward D.	앉는서앞지르기	anneun seo ap jireugi
8	Move the left foot to BD to form a left walking stance toward BD while executing a high side block to BD with the left outer forearm.	걷는서바깥팔목높은데옆막기	geonneun seo bakkat palmok nopeunde yeop makgi
9	Execute a circular block to D with the right inner forearm while maintaining a left walking stance toward BD.	걷는서안팔목돌리며막기	geonneun seo an palmok dollimyeo makgi
10	Execute a scooping block with the left palm while forming a sitting stance toward AD.	앉는서손바닥들어막기	anneun seo sonbadak deureo makgi
11	Execute a middle punch to AD with the right fist while maintaining a sitting stance toward AD. Perform 10 and 11 in a connecting motion.	앉는서앞지르기, 이어진동작	anneun seo ap jireugi, ieojin dongjak
12	Bring the left foot to the right foot, and then move the right foot to AD to form a right walking stance toward AD while executing a high side block to AD with the right outer forearm.	걷는서바깥팔목높은데옆막기	geonneun seo bakkat palmok nopeunde yeop makgi
13	Execute a circular block to D with the left inner forearm while maintaining a right walking stance toward AD.	걷는서안팔목돌리며막기	geonneun seo an palmok dollimyeo makgi
14	Execute a scooping block with the right palm while forming a sitting stance toward BD.	앉는서손바닥들어막기	anneun seo sonbadak deureo makgi
15	Execute a middle punch to BD with the left fist while maintaining a right walking stance toward BD. Perform 14 and 15 in a connecting motion.	앉는서앞지르기, 이어진동작	anneun seo ap jireugi, ieojin dongjak
16	Execute a high hooking block to BC with the right palm while forming a left walking stance toward BC.	걷는서손바닥높은데반대걸쳐막기	geonneun seo sonbadak nopeunde bandae geolchyeo makgi
17	Execute a middle punch to BD with the left fist while forming a sitting stance toward BD.	앉는서앞지르기	anneun seo ap jireugi
18	Execute a high hooking block to AD with the left palm while forming a right walking stance toward AD.	걷는서손바닥높은데반대걸쳐막기	geonneun seo sonbadak nopeunde bandae geolchyeo makgi
19	Execute a middle punch to BD with the right fist while forming sitting stance toward BD. Perform 16, 17, 18 and 19 in a continuous motion.	앉는서앞지르기, 계속동작	anneun seo ap jireugi, gyesok dongjak
20	Move the right foot to C, forming a left walking stance toward D at the same time executing a pressing block with an X-fist.	걷는서교차주먹눌러막기	geonneun seo gyocha jumeok nulleo makgi
21	Execute a rising block with an X-knife-hand while maintaining a left walking stance toward D. Perform 20 and 21 in a continuous motion.	걷는서교차손칼추켜막기, 계속동작	geonneun seo gyocha sonkal chukyeo makgi, gyesok dongjak
22	Execute a middle punch to D with the right fist, slipping the left palm up to the right elbow joint while maintaining a left walking stance toward D.	걷는서반대앞지르기	geonneun seo bandae ap jireugi
23	Execute a low front snap kick to D with the right foot, keeping the position of the hands as they were in 22.	낮은데앞차부시기	najeunde ap cha busigi
24	Lower the right foot to D, forming a right walking stance toward D while executing a middle punch to D with the left fist.	걷는서반대앞지르기	geonneun seo bandae ap jireugi
25	Execute a pressing block with an X-fist while maintaining a right walking stance toward D.	걷는서교차주먹눌러막기	geonneun seo gyocha jumeok nulleo makgi
26	Execute a rising block with an X-knife-hand while maintaining a right walking stance toward D. Perform 25 and 26 in a continuous motion.	걷는서교차손칼추켜막기, 계속동작	geonneun seo gyocha sonkal chukyeo makgi, gyesok dongjak
27	Execute a middle punch to D with the left fist slipping the right palm up to the left elbow joint while maintaining a right walking stance toward D.	걷는서반대앞지르기	geonneun seo bandae ap jireugi
28	Execute a low front snap kick to D with the left foot, keeping the position of the hands as they were in 27.	낮은데앞차부시기	najeunde ap cha busigi
29	Lower the left foot to D to form a left walking stance toward D while executing a middle punch to D with the right fist.	걷는서반대앞지르기	geonneun seo bandae ap jireugi
30	Move the right foot to D, forming a left L-stance toward D while executing a middle guarding block to D with a knife-hand.	ㄴ자서손칼대비막기	nieunja seo sonkal daebi makgi
31	Move the left foot to D to form a right L-stance toward D while executing a middle guarding block to D with a knife-hand.	ㄴ자서손칼대비막기	nieunja seo sonkal daebi makgi
32	Move the left foot to C, forming a left L-stance toward D while executing a middle guarding block to D with a knife-hand.	ㄴ자서손칼대비막기	nieunja seo sonkal daebi makgi
33	Move the right foot to C to form a right L-stance toward D while executing a middle guarding block to D with a knife-hand.	ㄴ자서손칼대비막기	nieunja seo sonkal daebi makgi
34	Move the right foot to D, forming a right walking stance toward D while executing a high block to D with the right double forearm.	걷는서두팔목높은데막기	geonneun seo du palmok nopeunde makgi
35	Execute a low block to D with the left forearm, keeping the right forearm as it was in 34 while maintaining a right walking stance toward D. Perform 34 and 35 in a fast motion.	걷는서팔목낮은데반대막기, 빠른동작	geonneun seo palmok najeunde bandae makgi, ppareun dongjak
36	Move the left foot to D to form a left walking stance toward D while executing a high block to D with the left double forearm.	걷는서두팔목높은데막기	geonneun seo du palmok nopeunde makgi
37	Execute a low block to D with the right forearm, keeping the left forearm as it was in 36 while maintaining a left walking stance toward D. Perform 36 and 37 in a fast motion.	걷는서팔목낮은데반대막기, 빠른동작	geonneun seo palmok najeunde bandae makgi, ppareun dongjak
38	Move the right foot to D, forming aright walking stance toward D while executing a middle punch to D with the right fist.	걷는서앞지르기	geonneun seo ap jireugi
39	Move the left foot on line CD, and then turn counter-clockwise, pivoting with the left foot to form a right L-stance toward C while executing a high block to C with the left reverse knife-hand.	ㄴ자서손칼등높은데때막기	nieunja seo sonkal deung nopeunde ttae makgi
40	Bring the right foot to the left foot to form a closed ready stance C toward C.	모아준비서기	moa junbi seogi
41	Move the right foot to CF in a stamping motion to form a right walking stance toward CG at the same time executing an upset punch to CF with a twin fist.	구르며걷는서쌍주먹뒤집어지르기	gureumyeo geonneun seo ssang jumeok dwijibeo jireugi
42	Bring the right foot to the left foot, and then move the left foot to CE in a stamping motion, forming a left walking stance toward CE while executing an upset punch to CE with a twin fist.	구르며걷는서쌍주먹뒤집어지르기	gureumyeo geonneun seo ssang jumeok dwijibeo jireugi
43	Bring the left foot to the right foot, and ten move the right foot to F to form a left L-stance toward F while executing a middle block to F with the right inner forearm.	ㄴ자서안팔목가운데옆막기	nieunja seo an palmok gaunde yeop makgi
44	Execute a middle punch to F with the left fist while maintaining a left L-stance toward F.	ㄴ자서바로앞지르기	nieunja seo baro ap jireugi
45	Bring the left foot to the right foot to form a closed stance toward C while executing an angle punch with the right fist. Perform 45 in slow motion.	모아서앞주먹ㄱ자지르기, 느린동작	moa seo ap jumeok nieunja jireugi, neurin dongjak
46	Move the left foot to E to form a right L-stance toward E while executing a middle block to E with the left inner forearm.	ㄴ자서안팔목가운데옆막기	nieunja seo an palmok gaunde yeop makgi
47	Execute a middle punch to E with the right fist while maintaining a right L-stance toward E.	ㄴ자서바로앞지르기	nieunja seo baro ap jireugi
48	Bring the right foot to the left foot to form a closed stance toward C while executing an angle punch with the left fist. Perform 45 in slow motion.	모아서앞주먹ㄱ자지르기, 느린동작	moa seo ap jumeok nieunja jireugi, neurin dongjak
49	Move the left foot to E forming a left fixed stance toward E while executing a U-shape punch to E.	고정서ㄷ자지르기	gojeong seo digeutja jireugi
50	Bring the left foot to the right foot, and then move the right foot to E, forming a right fixed stance toward E while executing a U-shape punch to E.	고정서ㄷ자지르기	gojeong seo digeutja jireugi
51	Move the right foot on line CD in a stamping motion to form a sitting stance toward E while executing a front strike to E with the right back fist.	구르며앉는서등주먹앞때리기	gureumyeo anneun seo deung jumeok ap ttaerigi
52	Execute a waving kick to D with the right foot, and then a high outward block to AC with the right outer forearm, keeping the position of the hands as they were in 51 while forming a sitting stance toward E.	도로차기, 앉는서바깥팔목높은데밖으로막기	doro chagi, anneun seo bakkat palmok nopeunde bakkeuro makgi
53	Execute a waving kick to C with the left foot, and then a high front block to ED with the right outer forearm, keeping the position of the hands as they were in 52 while forming a sitting stance toward E.	도로차기, 앉는서바깥팔목높은데밖으로막기	doro chagi, anneun seo bakkat palmok nopeunde bakkeuro makgi
54	Execute a horizontal strike to C with the right back hand while maintaining a sitting stance toward E.	앉는서손등수평때리기	anneun seo sondeung supyeong ttaerigi
55	Execute a middle crescent kick to the right palm with the left foot.	가운데반달차기	gaunde bandal chagi
56	Execute a middle side piercing kick to C with the left foot forming a forearm guarding block. Perform 55 and 56 in a consecutive kick.	가운데옆차지르기, 차례차례동작	gaunde yeop cha jireugi, charye charye dongjak
57	Lower the left foot to C to form a sitting stance toward B while executing a horizontal strike to C with the left back hand.	앉는서손등수평때리기	anneun seo sondeung supyeong ttaerigi
58	Execute a middle crescent kick to the left palm with the right foot.	가운데반달차기	gaunde bandal chagi
59	Execute a middle side piercing kick to C with the right foot, forming a forearm guarding block. Perform 58 and 59 in a consecutive kick.	가운데옆차지르기, 차례차례동작	gaunde yeop cha jireugi, charye charye dongjak
60	Lower the right foot to C, forming a sitting stance toward A while executing a right 9-shape block.	앉는서구자막기	anneun seo guja makgi
61	Change the position of the hands while maintaining a sitting stance toward A.	앉는서구자막기	anneun seo guja makgi
62	Move the left foot to C, turning clockwise to form a sitting stance toward B while executing a right 9-shape block.	앉는서구자막기	anneun seo guja makgi
63	Change the position of the hands while maintaining a sitting stance toward B.	앉는서구자막기	anneun seo guja makgi
64	Execute a downward strike to D with the right side fist while forming a left vertical stance toward, pulling the left foot.	수직서옆주먹반대내려때리기	sujik seo yeop jumeok bandae naeryeo ttaerigi
65	Move the right foot to A to form a left walking stance toward B while executing a high vertical punch to B with a twin fist.	걷는서쌍주먹높은데세워지르기	geonneun seo ssang jumeok nopeunde sewo jireugi
66	Move the right foot to B, turning counter-clockwise to form a left walking stance toward A while executing a high vertical punch to A with a twin fist.	걷는서쌍주먹높은데세워지르기	geonneun seo ssang jumeok nopeunde sewo jireugi
67	Bring the right foot to the left foot, and ten move the left foot to BD to form a right L-stance toward BD while executing a middle guarding block to BD with a knife-hand.	ㄴ자서손칼대비막기	nieunja seo sonkal daebi makgi
68	Bring the left foot to the right foot, and then move the right foot to AD to form a left L-stance toward AD while executing a middle guarding block to AD with a knife-hand.	ㄴ자서손칼대비막기	nieunja seo sonkal daebi makgi
	Move the right foot to the warrior ready stance B facing D.	무사준비서기	musa junbi seogi

== Trivia ==
- Yoo-Sin is one the teul that refers to the Kingdom of Silla, next to Won-Hyo, Hwa-Rang, and Moon-Moo.
- The ready stance represents a sword on the right side instead of the (regular) left side, which symbolizes Kim Yusin's mistake of following his king's orders of collaborating with the foreign Tang army to fight against his own nation.
