= Yon-Gae (teul) =

Nineteenth ITF Taekwon-Do pattern

19. Yon-Gae
연개
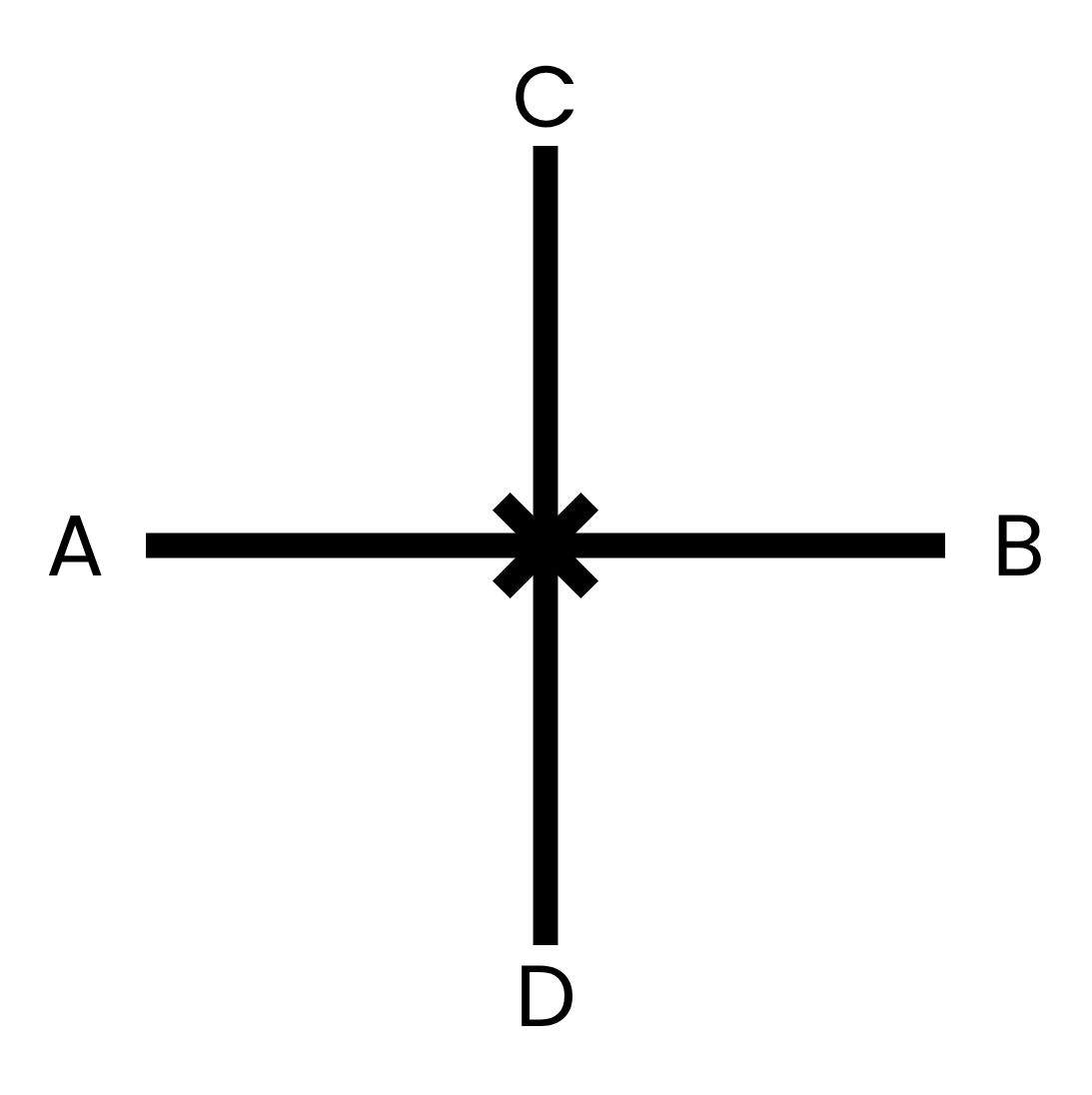
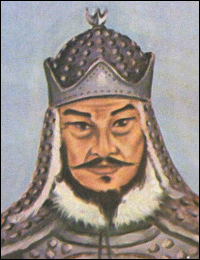
- Diagram of Yon-Gae Yeon Gaesomun
- Movements: 49
- Begin stance: Warrior ready stance A
- Return foot: Right
- Meaning: Yeon Gaesomun
- Associated dan: 4th

Yon-Gae (Korean: 연개; RR: Yeongae, Korean pronunciation: [jʌn.kɛ]) is the nineteenth Taekwon-Do teul, as defined by the International Taekwon-Do Federation. The pattern consists of 49 movements and is taught to students with the 4th dan (black belt) and necessary to know to obtain the 5th dan.

== Meaning ==
The pattern is named after Yeon Gaesomun, a general and military dictator of Goguryeo. Yeon committed a successful coup d'état in 642 after a lengthy power struggle and proclaimed himself tae mangniji, assuming absolute de facto control over Goguryeo affairs of state. Moreover, Yeon lead the military resistance against the Tang dynasty until his death around 666. Goguryeo would be conquered two years later and became part of Unified Silla.

=== Number of movements ===
Yon-Gae has 49 movements in reference to the last two digits of the year 649, in which general Yeon defeated the troops of the Tang dynasty in Korea.

== Movements ==
Nr.	English description	Korean description (in Hangul)	Korean description (in Revised Romanisation)
	Warrior ready stance A facing D	모아준비서기	musa junbi seogi
1	Slide to C to form a right L-stance toward D while executing a low guarding block to D with a reverse knife-hand. Perform in a circular motion.	미끌며ㄴ자서손칼등낮은데대비막기	mikkeulmyeo nieunja seo sonkal deung najeunde daebi makgi
2	Execute a high punch to D with the right long fist while forming a left walking stance toward D pivoting with the left foot. Perform in slow motion.	걷는서긴주먹높은데반대지르기, 느린동작	geonneun seog in jumeok nopeunde bandae jireugi, neurin dongjak
3	Slide to C forming a left L-stance toward D while executing a middle guarding block to D with the forearm.	미끌며ㄴ자서대비막기	mikkeulmyeo nieunja seo daebi makgi
4	Execute a middle outward strike to D with the right knife-hand while flying to D and then land to D forming a left L-stance toward D with the right knife-hand extended to D.	뛰며손칼옆때리기	ttwimyeo sonkal yeop ttaerigi
5	Shift to C maintaining a left L-stance toward D while executing a checking block to D with an X-fist.	잦은발, ㄴ자서교차주먹멈춰막기	jajeunbal, nieunja seo gyocha jumeok meomchwo makgi
6	Execute a high outward cross-cut to D with the right flat finger tip while forming a right walking stance toward D, slipping the right foot.	걷는서엎은손끝높은데밖으로긋기	geonneun seo eopeun sonkkeut nopeunde bakkeuro geutgi
7	Execute a downward thrust with the right straight elbow while forming a left rear foot stance toward D, pulling the right foot.	뒷발서선팔굽반대내려뚫기	dwitbal seo seon palgup bandae naeryeo ttulki
8	Jump to D forming a left X-stance toward AD while executing a high side strike to D with the left back fist.	뛰며겨차서등주먹높은데옆때리기	ttwimyeo gyeocha seo deung jumeok nopeunde yeop ttaerigi
9	Move the right foot to C to form a left walking stance toward D while executing a low outward block to D with the right knife-hand.	걷는서손칼낮은데반대막기	geonneun seo sonkal najeunde bandae makgi
10	Move the right foot on line AB to form a parallel stance toward D while executing a middle hooking block to D with the left palm.	나란히서손바닥가운데걸쳐막기	narani seo sonbadak gaunde geolchyeo makgi
11	Execute a middle punch to D with the right fist while maintaining a parallel stance toward D.	나란히서앞지르기	narani seo ap jireugi
12	Slide to C forming a left L-stance toward D while executing a low guarding block to D with a reverse knife-hand. Perform in a circular motion.	미끌며ㄴ자서손칼등낮은데대비막기	mikkeulmyeo nieunja seo sonkal deung najeunde daebi makgi
13	Execute a high punch to D with the left long fist while forming a right walking stance toward D, pivoting with the right foot. Perform in slow motion.	걷는서긴주먹높은데반대지르기, 느린동작	geonneun seog in jumeok nopeunde bandae jireugi, neurin dongjak
14	Slide to C forming a right L-stance toward D while executing a middle guarding block to D with the forearm.	미끌며ㄴ자서대비막기	mikkeulmyeo nieunja seo daebi makgi
15	Execute a middle outward strike to D with the left knife-hand while flying to D and then land to D forming a right L-stance toward D with the left knife-hand extended to D.	뛰며손칼옆때리기	ttwimyeo sonkal yeop ttaerigi
16	Shift to C maintaining a right L-stance toward D while executing a checking block to D with an X-fist.	잦은발, ㄴ자서교차주먹멈춰막기	jajeunbal, nieunja seo gyocha jumeok meomchwo makgi
17	Execute a high outward cross-cut to D with the left flat finger tip while forming a left walking stance toward D, slipping the left foot.	걷는서엎은손끝높은데밖으로긋기	geonneun seo eopeun sonkkeut nopeunde bakkeuro geutgi
18	Execute a downward thrust with the left straight elbow while forming a right rear foot stance toward D, pulling the left foot.	뒷발서선팔굽반대내려뚫기	dwitbal seo seon palgup bandae naeryeo ttulki
19	Jump to D forming a right X-stance toward BD while executing a high side strike to D with the right back fist.	뛰며겨차서등주먹높은데옆때리기	ttwimyeo gyeocha seo deung jumeok nopeunde yeop ttaerigi
20	Move the left foot to C to form a right walking stance toward D while executing a low outward block to D with the left knife-hand.	걷는서손칼낮은데반대막기	geonneun seo sonkal najeunde bandae makgi
21	Move the left foot on line AB to form a parallel stance toward D while executing a middle hooking block to D with the right palm.	나란히서손바닥가운데걸쳐막기	narani seo sonbadak gaunde geolchyeo makgi
22	Execute a middle punch to D with the left fist while maintaining a parallel stance toward D.	나란히서앞지르기	narani seo ap jireugi
23	Move the right foot to A to form a sitting stance toward D while executing a W-shape block with the reverse knife-hand.	앉는서손칼등산막기	anneun seo sonkal deung san makgi
24	Cross the left foot over the right foot to form a right X-stance toward D while executing a horizontal thrust with a twin elbow.	겨차서쌍팔굽수평뚫기	gyeocha seo ssang palgup supyeong ttulki
25	Move the right foot to A forming a sitting stance toward D while executing a checking block to D with a twin straight forearm.	앉는서선팔목멈춰막기	anneun seo seon palmok meomchwo makgi
26	Cross the left foot over the right foot to form a right X-stance toward D while executing an upward punch with the right fist, pulling the left side fist in front of the right shoulder.	겨차서앞주먹올려지르기	gyeocha seo ap jumeok ollyeo jireugi
27	Execute a high reverse hooking kick to B with the right foot.	높은데반대돌려걸어차기	nopeunde bandae dollyeo georeo chagi
28	Lower the right foot to B and then execute a high side piercing kick to B with the left foot pulling both hands in front of the chest while turning clockwise.	높운데옆차지르기	nopunde yeop cha jireugi
29	Lower the left foot to B in a jumping motion to form a left X-stance toward BD while executing a downward strike to B with the left backfist.	뛰며겨차서등주먹내려때리기	ttwimyeo gyeocha seo deung jumeok naeryeo ttaerigi
30	Move the left foot to B to form a sitting stance toward D while executing a W-shape block with the reverse knife-hand.	앉는서손칼등산막기	anneun seo sonkal deung san makgi
31	Cross the right foot over the left foot to form a left X-stance toward D while executing a horizontal thrust with a twin elbow.	겨차서쌍팔굽수평뚫기	gyeocha seo ssang palgup supyeong ttulki
32	Move the left foot to B forming a sitting stance toward D while executing a checking block to D with a twin straight forearm.	앉는서선팔목멈춰막기	anneun seo seon palmok meomchwo makgi
33	Cross the right foot over the left foot to form a left X-stance toward D while executing an upward punch with the left fist, pulling the right side fist in front of the left shoulder.	겨차서앞주먹올려지르기	gyeocha seo ap jumeok ollyeo jireugi
34	Execute a high reverse hooking kick to A with the left foot.	높은데반대돌려걸어차기	nopeunde bandae dollyeo georeo chagi
35	Lower the left foot to A and then execute a high side piercing kick to A with the right foot pulling both hands in front of the chest while turning counter clockwise.	높운데옆차지르기	nopunde yeop cha jireugi
36	Lower the right foot to A in a jumping motion to form a right X-stance toward AD while executing a downward strike to A with the right backfist.	뛰며겨차서등주먹내려때리기	ttwimyeo gyeocha seo deung jumeok naeryeo ttaerigi
37	Move the left foot to C forming a left L-stance toward D while executing a middle guarding block to D with the forearm.	ㄴ자서대비막기	nieunja seo daebi makgi
38	Move the left foot to D turning counter clockwise to form a left rear foot stance toward C while executing a waist block to C with the right inner forearm.	뒷발서안팔목허리막기	dwitbal seo an palmok eori makgi
39	Move the right foot to C slightly and then the left foot to D in a stamping motion to form a right L-stance toward D while executing a high outward strike to D with the left knife-hand.	구르며ㄴ자서손칼높은데옆때리기	gureumyeo nieunja seo sonkal nopeunde yeop ttaerigi
40	Shift to C maintaining a right L-stance toward D while executing a middle guarding block to D with the forearm.	잦은발, ㄴ자서대비막기	jajeunbal, nieunja seo daebi makgi
41	Move the right foot to D turning clockwise to form a right rear foot stance toward C while executing a waist block to C with the left inner forearm.	뒷발서안팔목허리막기	dwitbal seo an palmok eori makgi
42	Move the left foot to C slightly and then the right foot to D in a stamping motion to form a left L-stance toward D while executing a high outward strike to D with the right knife-hand.	구르며ㄴ자서손칼높은데옆때리기	gureumyeo nieunja seo sonkal nopeunde yeop ttaerigi
43	Move the right foot to C turning counter clockwise to form a right L-stance toward D while executing a middle guarding block to D with the forearm.	ㄴ자서대비막기	nieunja seo daebi makgi
44	Jump to execute a mid-air kick to D with the right foot while spinning clockwise and then land to D to form a left L-stance toward D while executing a middle guarding block to D with a knife-hand.	뛰어돌며 차기, ㄴ자서손칼대비막기	ttwieo dolmyeo chagi, nieunja seo sonkal daebi makgi
45	Jump to execute a mid-air kick to D with the left foot while spinning counter clockwise and then land to D to form a right L-stance toward D while executing a middle guarding block to D with a knife-hand.	뛰어돌며 차기, ㄴ자서손칼대비막기	ttwieo dolmyeo chagi, nieunja seo sonkal daebi makgi
46	Execute a low inward block to D with the right reverse knife-hand pulling the left side fist in front of the right shoulder while forming a left walking stance toward D, slipping the right foot to C.	걷는서손칼등낮은데반대안으로막기	geonneun seo sonkal deung najeunde bandae aneuro makgi
47	Slide to C to form a left L-stance toward D while thrusting to C with the left side elbow.	미끌며ㄴ자서때팔굽뚫기	mikkeulmyeo nieunja seo ttae palgup ttulki
48	Execute a low inward block to D with the left reverse knife-hand pulling the right side fist in front of the left shoulder while forming a right walking stance toward D, slipping the left foot to C.	걷는서손칼등낮은데반대안으로막기	geonneun seo sonkal deung najeunde bandae aneuro makgi
49	Slide to C forming a right L-stance toward D while thrusting to C with the right side elbow.	미끌며ㄴ자서때팔굽뚫기	mikkeulmyeo nieunja seo ttae palgup ttulki
	Move the right foot to the warrior ready stance A facing D.	무사준비서기	musa junbi seogi

== Trivia ==
- Yon-Gae is one of the patterns that refers to the Kingdom of Goguryeo, next to Kwang-Gae and Ul-Ji.
- The ready stance represents Yeon Gaesomun standing ready to take his sword.
