= Kyebaek =

Korean general (fl. 7th century)

- Hangul: 계백
- Hanja: 階伯
- RR: Gyebaek
- MR: Kyebaek

Kyebaek (died August 20, 660), was a general in the ancient Korean kingdom of Baekje during the early to mid-7th century. Little else is known of his personal life—including the year and location of his birth.

== The Last Battle ==
In 660, Baekje was invaded by a force of 50,000 from Silla, supported by 144,000 Tang soldiers. Kyebaek, with only 5,000 troops under his command, met them in the battlefield of Hwangsanbeol. Before entering the battlefield, Kyebaek reportedly killed his wife and children to prevent them from being enslaved if he lost.

His forces won four initial battles, causing severe casualties to Silla forces. General Kyebaek fought very courageously and killed many Silla soldiers. However, in the end, exhausted and surrounded, Kyebaek's army was outnumbered and overwhelmed. Baekje's forces were annihilated in battle along with their leader Kyebaek.

== Aftermath ==
Baekje was destroyed, shortly after Kyebaek's defeat and death at Hwangsanbeol.

As Neo-Confucian philosophy became more influential in the later Korean Dynasties, Kyebaek was recognized by historians and scholars as exemplifying the Confucian ideals of patriotism and devotion to his king, Uija, and praised as such. Although not much else is known about Kyebaek's life, his actions leading up to his last battle are well known to many Koreans.

== In Taekwon-Do ==
Ge-Baek is the 12th pattern or hyeong in the International Taekwon-Do Federation teul of the Korean martial art Taekwon-Do. It is practised by the 1st Dan black belt. The pattern has 44 moves, and the diagram (I) represents his severe and strict military discipline.

== In popular culture ==
- Portrayed by Lee Jung-woong in the 1986 KBS1 TV series Great Monk Wonhyo
- Portrayed by Yoo Dong-geun in the 1992–1993 KBS1 TV series The Three Kingdoms
- Portrayed by Park Joong-hoon in the 2003 film Once Upon a Time in a Battlefield
- Portrayed by Jung Heung-chae in 2006–2007 SBS TV series Yeon Gaesomun
- Portrayed by Choi Won-young in the 2009 MBC TV series Queen Seondeok
- Portrayed by Lee Seo-jin and Lee Hyun-woo in the 2011 MBC TV series Kyebaek
- Portrayed by Choi Jae-sung in the 2012–2013 KBS1 TV series Dream of the Emperor
- Portrayed by Kim Woo-dam in the 2026–2027 KBS2 TV series Sword & Silence
- Featured in Age of Empires II HD Edition

== See also ==
- History of Korea
- Three Kingdoms of Korea
- Gyebaek (TV series)

== Bibliography ==
- McBride, Richard (2024), The Three Kingdoms of Korea: Lost Civilizations
