= Choi-Yong (teul) =

Eighteenth ITF Taekwon-Do pattern

18. Choi-Yong
최영
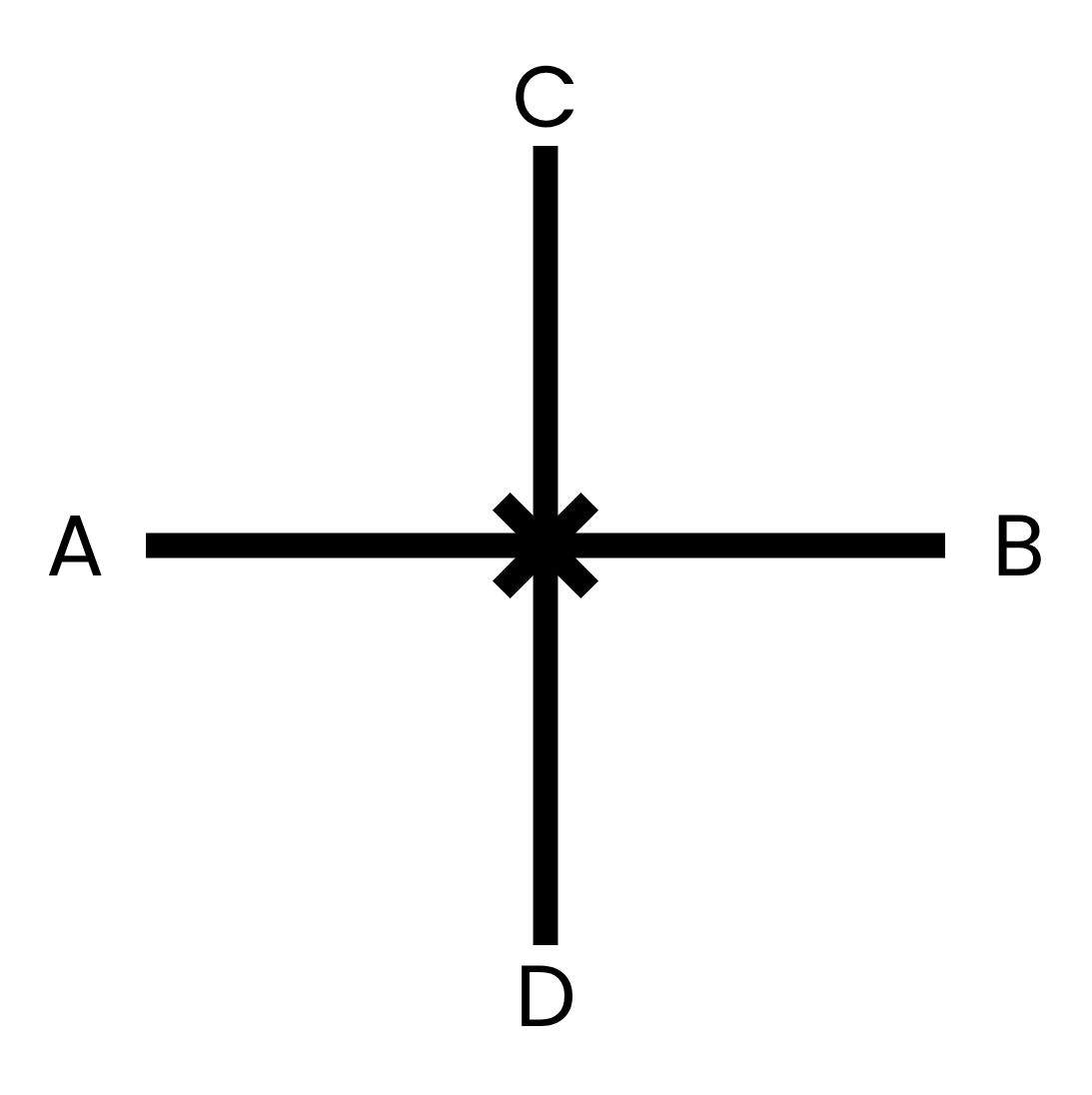
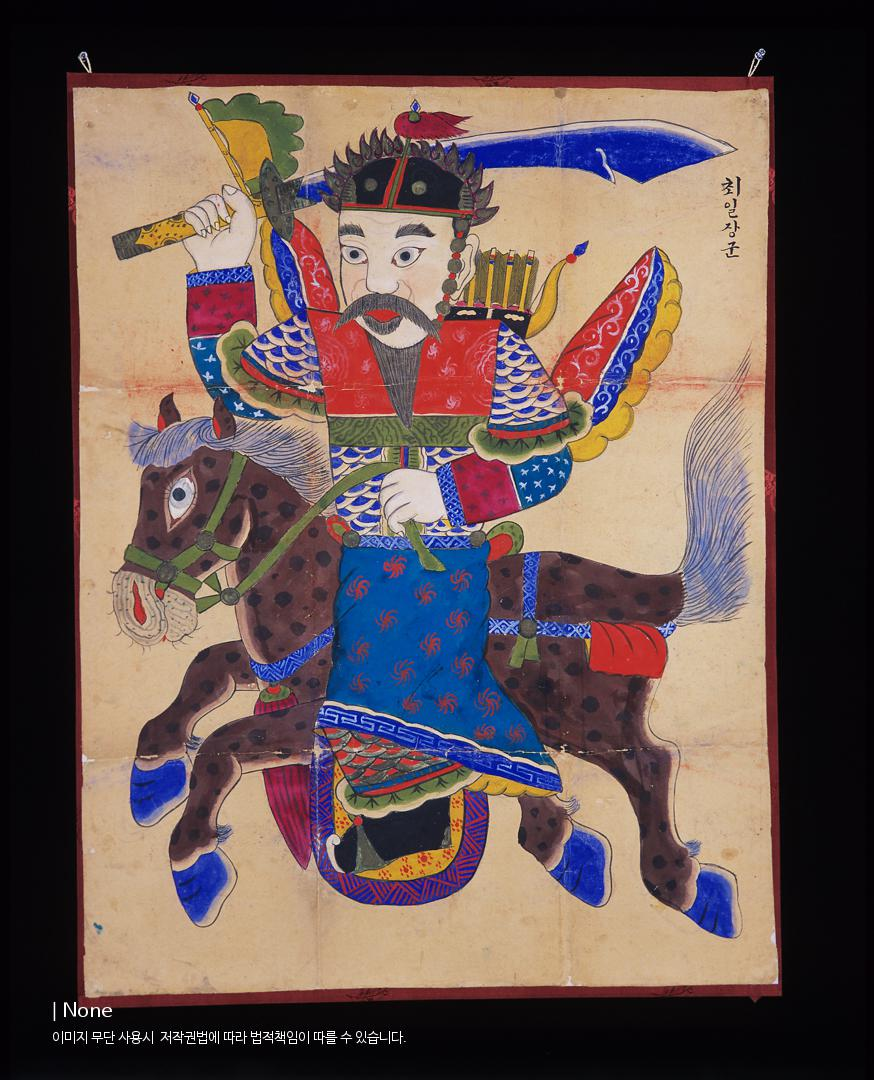
- Diagram of Choi-Yong Choe Yeong
- Movements: 46
- Begin stance: Closed ready stance C
- Return foot: Right
- Meaning: Choe Yeong
- Associated dan: 3rd

Choi-Yong (Korean: 최영; RR: Choeyeong, Korean pronunciation: [tɕʰwe.jʌŋ]) is the eighteenth Taekwon-Do teul, as defined by the International Taekwon-Do Federation. The pattern consists of 46 movements and is taught to students with the 3rd dan (black belt) and necessary to know to obtain the 4th dan.

== Meaning ==
The pattern is named after Choe Yeong, a 14th century Korean general who stopped a rebellion against his king. Moreover, he fought against the Red Turban Rebellions and later allied with the Ming dynasty to overthrow the Mongol Yuan dynasty. General Choe was betrayed and executed by his former subordinate Yi Seonggye, who founded the Joseon dynasty of Korea, bringing an end to the Goryeo period.

=== Number of movements ===
It is unclear why the pattern has 46 movements, but it is close to the age around which Choe Yeong resumed his successful military career.

== Movements ==
Nr.	English description	Korean description (in Hangul)	Korean description (in Revised Romanisation)
	Closed ready stance C facing D	모아준비서기	moa junbi seogi
1	Move the left foot to D to form a right rear foot stance toward D while executing a middle guarding block to D with the forearm.	뒷발서대비막기	dwitbal seo daebi makgi
2	Execute a high punch to D with the left middle knuckle fist while maintaining a right rear foot stance toward D.	뒷발서중지주먹높은데지르기	dwitbal seo jungji jumeok nopeunde jireugi
3	Move the left foot on line CD to form a left rear foot stance toward C while executing a middle guarding block to C with the forearm.	뒷발서대비막기	dwitbal seo daebi makgi
4	Execute a high punch to C with the right middle knuckle fist while maintaining a left rear foot stance toward C.	뒷발서중지주먹높은데지르기	dwitbal seo jungji jumeok nopeunde jireugi
5	Move the right foot on line CD to form a left walking stance toward D while executing a rising block with the left knife-hand.	걷는서손칼추켜막기	geonneun seo sonkal chukyeo makgi
6	Execute a circular block to AD with the right inner forearm while maintaining a left walking stance toward D.	걷는서안팔목돌리며막기	geonneun seo an palmok dollimyeo makgi
7	Execute a middle punch to D with the left fist while maintaining a left walking stance toward D.	걷는서앞지르기	geonneun seo ap jireugi
8	Move the left foot on line CD to form a right walking stance toward C while executing a rising block with the right knife-hand.	걷는서손칼추켜막기	geonneun seo sonkal chukyeo makgi
9	Execute a circular block to AC with the left inner forearm while maintaining a right walking stance toward C.	걷는서안팔목돌리며막기	geonneun seo an palmok dollimyeo makgi
10	Execute a middle punch to C with the right fist while maintaining a right walking stance toward C.	걷는서앞지르기	geonneun seo ap jireugi
11	Move the right foot on line CD to form a right L-stance toward D while executing a low guarding block to D with a knife-hand.	ㄴ자서손칼낮은데대비막기	nieunja seo sonkal najeunde daebi makgi
12	Execute a middle turning kick to AD with the right foot and then lower it to the side front of the left foot.	가운데돌려차기	gaunde dollyeo chagi
13	Execute a high reverse hooking kick to D with the left foot.	높은데반대돌려걸어차기	nopeunde bandae dollyeo georeo chagi
14	Execute a middle side piercing kick to D with the left foot, pulling both hands in the opposite direction. Perform 13 and 14 in a consecutive kick.	가운데옆차지르기, 차례차례동작	gaunde yeop cha jireugi, charye charye dongjak
15	Lower the left foot to D forming a left walking stance toward D while striking the left palm with the right front elbow.	걷는서앞팔굽때리기	geonneun seo ap palgup ttaerigi
16	Move the left foot on line CD to form a left L-stance toward C while executing a low guarding block to C with a knife-hand.	ㄴ자서손칼낮은데대비막기	nieunja seo sonkal najeunde daebi makgi
17	Execute a middle turning kick to AC with the left foot and then lower it to the side front of the right foot.	가운데돌려차기	gaunde dollyeo chagi
18	Execute a high reverse hooking kick to C with the right foot.	높은데반대돌려걸어차기	nopeunde bandae dollyeo georeo chagi
19	Execute a middle side piercing kick to C with the right foot, pulling both hands in the opposite direction. Perform 18 and 19 in a consecutive kick.	가운데옆차지르기, 차례차례동작	gaunde yeop cha jireugi, charye charye dongjak
20	Lower the right foot to C forming a right walking stance toward C while striking the right palm with the left front elbow.	걷는서앞팔굽때리기	geonneun seo ap palgup ttaerigi
21	Move the left foot to C to form a left walking stance toward C while executing a pressing block with the right palm.	걷는서손바닥눌러막기	geonneun seo sonbadak nulleo makgi
22	Move the right foot to C forming a right walking stance toward C while executing a pressing block with the left palm. Perform 21 and 22 in a fast motion.	걷는서손바닥눌러막기, 빠른동작	geonneun seo sonbadak nulleo makgi, ppareun dongjak
23	Move the right foot to D and then the left foot to D, turning counter clockwise to form a left walking stance toward D while executing a W-shape block with a knife-hand.	이보옮겨디디며돌기걷는서손칼산막기	ibo olgyeo didimyeo dolgi geonneun seo sonkal san makgi
24	Execute a middle front snap kick to D with the right foot keeping the position of the hands as they were in 23.	가운데앞차부시기	gaunde ap cha busigi
25	Lower the right foot to C forming a right L-stance toward D while executing a middle guarding block to D with the forearm.	ㄴ자서대비막기	nieunja seo daebi makgi
26	Move the right foot to D to form a right walking stance toward D while executing a W-shape block with a knife-hand.	걷는서손칼산막기	geonneun seo sonkal san makgi
27	Execute a middle front snap kick to D with the left foot keeping the position of the hands as they were in 26.	가운데앞차부시기	gaunde ap cha busigi
28	Lower the left foot to d forming a left L-stance toward C while executing a middle guarding block to C with the forearm.	ㄴ자서대비막기	nieunja seo daebi makgi
29	Move the left foot to C and the right foot to C then slide to C turning clockwise to form a left L-stance toward D while executing a middle guarding block to D with the forearm.	삼보옮겨디디며미끌며돌기ㄴ자서대비막기	sambo olgyeo didimyeo mikkeulmyeo dolgi nieunja seo daebi makgi
30	Move the left foot to D forming a left walking stance toward D while executing a high thrust to D with the left flat fingertip.	걷는서엎은손끝높은데뚫기	geonneun seo eopeun sonkkeut nopeunde ttulki
31	Move the left foot on line CD forming a right walking stance toward C while executing a high thrust to C with the right flat fingertip.	걷는서엎은손끝높은데뚫기	geonneun seo eopeun sonkkeut nopeunde ttulki
32	Move the right foot to D turning clockwise to form a parallel stance toward B while executing a middle hooking block to B with the right palm.	나란히서손바닥가운데걸쳐막기	narani seo sonbadak gaunde geolchyeo makgi
33	Execute a middle punch to B with the left fist while maintaining a parallel stance toward B.	나란히서앞지르기	narani seo ap jireugi
34	Turn the face toward A while forming a left bending ready stance A toward A.	구부려준비서기	guburyeo junbi seogi
35	Execute a middle side piercing kick to A with the right foot forming a forearm guarding block.	가운데옆차지르기	gaunde yeop cha jireugi
36	Lower the right foot to A in a jumping motion to form a right X-stance toward AD while executing a high side strike to A with the right back fist and bringing the left finger belly to the right side fist.	뛰며겨차서등주먹높은데옆때리기	ttwimyeo gyeocha seo deung jumeok nopeunde yeop ttaerigi
37	Execute a high reverse hooking kick to B with the right foot.	높은데반대돌려걸어차기	nopeunde bandae dollyeo georeo chagi
38	Lower the right foot to B in a stamping motion to form a left L-stance toward B while executing a middle outward strike to B with the right knife-hand.	구르며ㄴ자서손칼옆때리기	gureumyeo nieunja seo sonkal yeop ttaerigi
39	Move the left foot to D turning counter-clockwise to form a parallel stance toward A at the same time executing a middle hooking block to A with the left palm.	나란히서손바닥가운데걸쳐막기	narani seo sonbadak gaunde geolchyeo makgi
40	Execute a middle punch to A with the right fist while maintaining a parallel stance toward A.	나란히서앞지르기	narani seo ap jireugi
41	Turn the face to B while forming a right bending ready stance A toward B.	구부려준비서기	guburyeo junbi seogi
42	Execute a middle side piercing kick to B with the left foot forming a forearm guarding block.	가운데옆차지르기	gaunde yeop cha jireugi
43	Lower the left foot to B in a jumping motion forming a left X-stance toward BD while executing a high side strike to B with the left back fist and bringing the right finger belly to the left side fist.	뛰며겨차서등주먹높은데옆때리기	ttwimyeo gyeocha seo deung jumeok nopeunde yeop ttaerigi
44	Execute a high reverse hooking kick to A with the left foot.	높은데반대돌려걸어차기	nopeunde bandae dollyeo georeo chagi
45	Lower the left foot to A in a stamping motion to form a right L-stance toward A while executing a middle outward strike to A with the left knife-hand.	구르며ㄴ자서손칼옆때리기	gureumyeo nieunja seo sonkal yeop ttaerigi
46	Slide to A to form a right fixed stance toward A while executing a middle punch to A with the right fist.	미끌며고정서바로앞지르기	mikkeulmyeo gojeong seo baro ap jireugi
	Move the right foot to the closed ready stance C facing D.	모아준비서기	moa junbi seogi

== Trivia ==
- Choi-Yong is one of the two patterns referring to the Goryeo period, the other being Po-Eun.
