= Saju tulgi =

Third ITF Taekwon-Do beginner exercise

사주뚫기
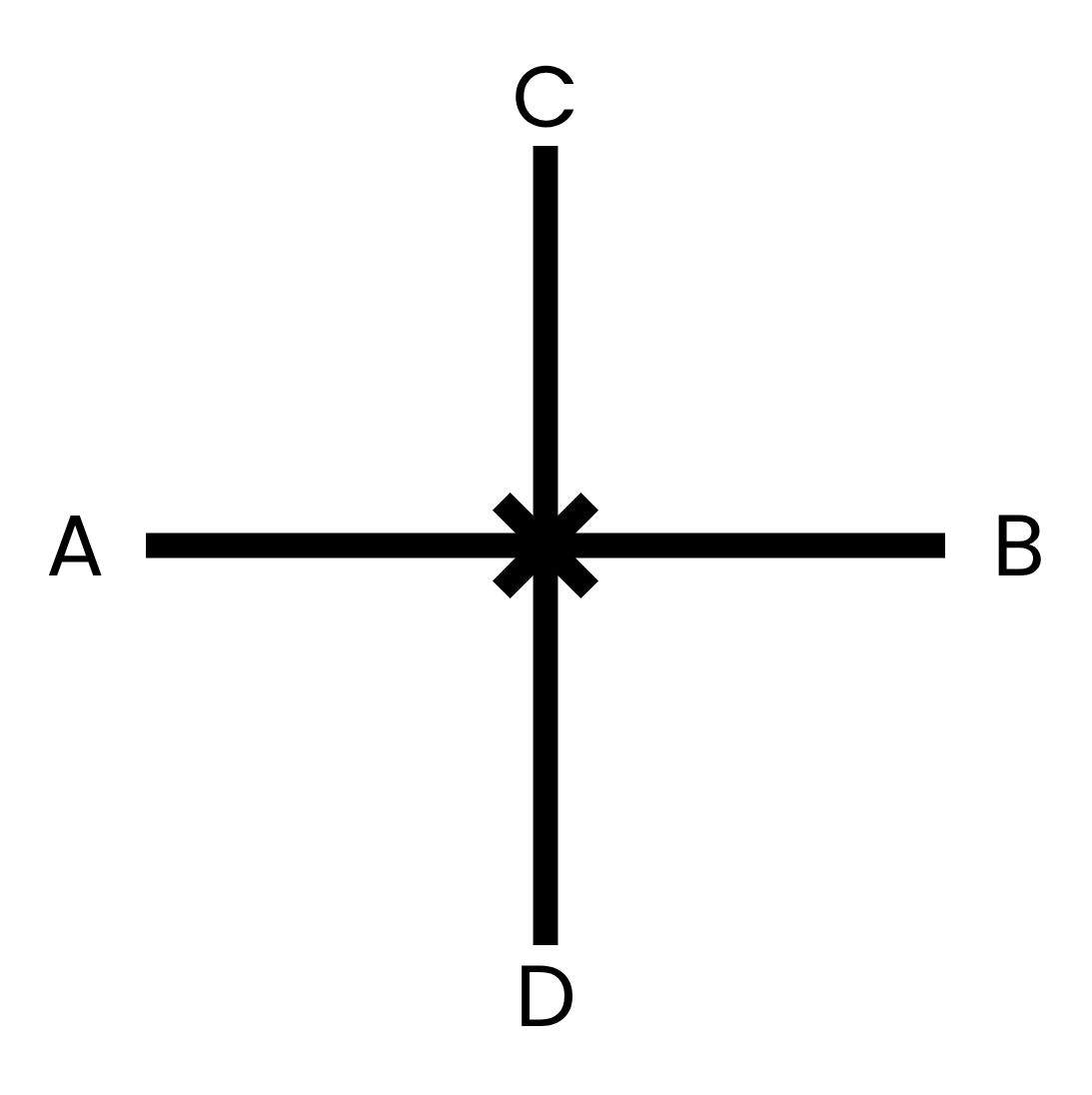
- Diagram of Cheon-Ji teul. Diagram of saju tulgi
- Movements: 8
- Begin stance: Closed ready stance C
- Return foot: Left
- Meaning: Four-way thrust
- Associated geup: 2nd

Saju tulgi (Korean: 사주뚫기; RR: saju ttulki; lit. 'four-way thrust', Korean pronunciation: [sa.tɕu.ˀtul.kʰi]) is the third saju, as defined by the International Taekwon-Do Federation. The pattern consists of 8 movements and is taught to students with the 2nd geup (red belt) and necessary to know to obtain the 1st geup (red-black belt).

Saju are beginner forms of teul and serve to prepare beginning Taekwon-Do students for the 24 teul, without forming part of this set of patterns. Concretely, the movements of saju tulgi are also present in Hwa-Rang, the eighth teul.

Saju tulgi is performed respectively counter-clockwise and clockwise, with all movements being repeated mirrored in the second part.

Due to its low number of movements and lack of variety, not all schools practise saju tulgi or hold a demonstration of the pattern as a requirement to obtain the 1st geup.

== Movements ==
Nr.	English description	Korean description (in Hangul)	Korean description (in Revised Romanisation)
	Closed ready stance C facing D	모아준비서기	moa junbi seogi
1	Pivot 180 degrees to the left and step back with the right foot into a right L stance facing C, executing a right rear elbow strike with the right-fist closed.	미끌며ㄴ자서때팔굽뚫기	mikkeulmyeo nieunja seo ttae palgup ttulki
2	Move the right foot back toward A by turning 90 degrees left to a right L stance, executing a right rear elbow strike with the right-fist closed.	미끌며ㄴ자서때팔굽뚫기	mikkeulmyeo nieunja seo ttae palgup ttulki
3	Move the right foot back toward D by turning 90 degrees left to a right L stance, executing a right rear elbow strike with the right-fist closed.	미끌며ㄴ자서때팔굽뚫기	mikkeulmyeo nieunja seo ttae palgup ttulki
4	Move the right foot back toward B by turning 90 degrees left to a right L stance, executing a right rear elbow strike with the right-fist closed.	미끌며ㄴ자서때팔굽뚫기	mikkeulmyeo nieunja seo ttae palgup ttulki
	Move the right foot to the closed ready stance C facing D.	모아준비서기	moa junbi seogi
5	Pivot 180 degrees to the right and step back with the left foot into a left L stance facing C, executing a left rear elbow strike with the left-fist closed.	미끌며ㄴ자서때팔굽뚫기	mikkeulmyeo nieunja seo ttae palgup ttulki
6	Move the left foot back toward B by turning 90 degrees right to a left L stance, executing a left rear elbow strike with the left-fist closed.	미끌며ㄴ자서때팔굽뚫기	mikkeulmyeo nieunja seo ttae palgup ttulki
7	Move the left foot back toward D by turning 90 degrees right to a left L stance, executing a left rear elbow strike with the left-fist closed.	미끌며ㄴ자서때팔굽뚫기	mikkeulmyeo nieunja seo ttae palgup ttulki
8	Move the left foot back toward A by turning 90 degrees right to a left L stance, executing a left rear elbow strike with the left-fist closed.	미끌며ㄴ자서때팔굽뚫기	mikkeulmyeo nieunja seo ttae palgup ttulki
	Move the left foot to the closed ready stance C facing D.	모아준비서기	moa junbi seogi
