= Ge-Baek (teul) =

Twelfth ITF Taekwon-Do pattern

12. Ge-Baek
계백
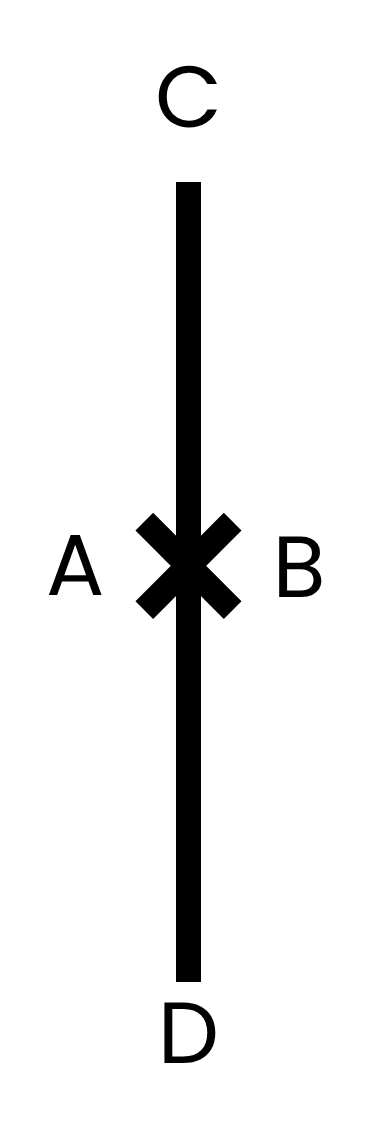
- Diagram of Gye-Baek teul. Diagram of Ge-Baek
- Movements: 44
- Begin stance: Parallel ready stance A
- Return foot: Right
- Meaning: Kyebaek
- Associated dan: 1st

Ge-Baek (Korean: 계백; RR: Gyebaek, Korean pronunciation: [ke.pɛk]) is the twelfth Taekwon-Do teul, as defined by the International Taekwon-Do Federation. The pattern consists of 44 movements and is taught to students with the 1st dan (black belt) and necessary to know to obtain the 2nd dan.

== Meaning ==
The pattern's name refers to Gyebaek, a 7th-century general from the kingdom of Baekje. He is best known for his perseverance during the Battle of Hwangsanbeol, in which he was severely outnumbered by the Silla army, but managed to inflict many casualties upon Silla and survive for a longer than expected, before losing and dying in battle.

=== Number of movements ===
While there is no formal justification for the number of movements of Ge-Baek, it could refer to the 44 battles that Gyebaek fought for Baekje.

== Movements ==
Nr.	English description	Korean description (in Hangul)	Korean description (in Revised Romanisation)
	Parallel ready stance A facing D	나란히준비서기	narani junbi seogi
1	Move the right foot to C forming a right L-stance toward D while executing a checking block D with an X-knife-hand.	ㄴ자서교차손칼멈춰막기	nieunja seo gyocha sonkal meomchwo makgi
2	Execute a low twisting kick to D with the right foot keeping the position of the hands as they were in movement 1.	낮은데비틀어차기	najeunde biteureo chagi
3	Lower the right foot to D forming a right walking stance toward D while executing a middle punch to D with the right fist.	걷는서앞지르기	geonneun seo ap jireugi
4	Execute a left middle punch to D in a right walking stance toward D. Perform 3 and 4 in fast motion.	걷는서반대앞지르기, 빠른동작	geonneun seo bandae ap jireugi, ppareun dongjak
5	Move the right foot to C forming a left walking stance toward D while executing a rising block with the left forearm.	걷는서추켜막기	geonneun seo chukyeo makgi
6	Execute a left low forearm block to D in a left walking stance toward D. Perform 5 and 6 in continuous motion.	걷는서팔목낮은데막기, 계속동작	geonneun seo palmok najeunde makgi, gyesok dongjak
7	Execute a high block to AD with a double arc hand while looking through it maintaining a left walking stance toward D.	걷는서두반달손높은데막기	geonneun seo du bandalson nopeunde makgi
8	Turn the face to D while forming a right bending ready stance A to D.	구부려준비서기	guburyeo junbi seogi
9	Lower the left foot to AD to form a sitting stance toward AC while executing a scooping block to AC with the left palm.	앉는서손바닥들어막기	anneun seo sonbadak deureo makgi
10	Execute a middle punch to AC with the right fist while maintaining a sitting stance toward AC. Perform 9 and 10 in connecting motion.	앉는서앞지르기, 이어진동작	anneun seo ap jireugi, ieojin dongjak
11	Execute a front strike to AC with the left back fist while maintaining a sitting stance toward AC.	앉는서등주먹앞때리기	anneun seo deung jumeok ap ttaerigi
12	Move the right foot on line AB, move the left foot to C forming a right L-stance to C while executing a middle knife-hand guarding block to C.	ㄴ자서손칼대비막기	nieunja seo sonkal daebi makgi
13	Execute a low side front snap kick to C with the left foot keeping the position of the hands as they were in movement 12.	낮은데옆앞차부시기	najeunde yeop ap cha busigi
14	Lower the left foot to C forming a left low stance toward C while executing a high thrust to C with the left flat finger tip.	낮춰서엎은손끝높은데뚫기	natchwo seo eopeun sonkkeut nopeunde ttulki
15	Execute a high thrust to C with the right flat finger tip while maintaining a left low stance toward C.	낮춰서엎은손끝높은데반대뚫기	natchwo seo eopeun sonkkeut nopeunde bandae ttulki
16	Execute a middle side piercing kick to C with the right foot while pulling both hands in the opposite direction.	가운데옆차지르기	gaunde yeop cha jireugi
17	Lower the right foot to C forming a right L-stance toward D while executing a middle guarding block to D with the forearm.	ㄴ자서대비막기	nieunja seo daebi makgi
18	Move the right foot to D turning counter clockwise to form a right L-stance toward C while executing a middle forearm guarding block to C.	ㄴ자서대비막기	nieunja seo daebi makgi
19	Move the left foot to D turning counter-clockwise to form a right L-stance toward D while executing a middle guarding block to D with a knife-hand.	ㄴ자서손칼대비막기	nieunja seo sonkal daebi makgi
20	Move the left foot on line CD to form a sitting stance toward A while executing a right 9-shape block.	앉는서구자막기	anneun seo guja makgi
21	Move the right foot to D, turning anti-clockwise to form a left walking stance toward C while executing a low block to C with the left knife-hand.	걷는서손칼낮은데막기	geonneun seo sonkal najeunde makgi
22	Execute a right middle turning kick to BC and lower the right foot to C.	가운데돌려차기	gaunde dollyeo chagi
23	Execute a flying side piercing kick to C with the right foot. Perform 22 and 23 in fast motion.	뛰며옆차지르기, 빠른동작	ttwimyeo yeop cha jireugi, ppareun dongjak
24	Land to C to form a right walking stance toward C while executing a high vertical punch to C with a twin fist.	걷는서쌍주먹높은데세워지르기	geonneun seo ssang jumeok nopeunde sewo jireugi
25	Execute a high block to AC with a double arc-hand while looking through it maintaining a right walking stance toward C.	걷는서두반달손높은데막기	geonneun seo du bandalson nopeunde makgi
26	Execute an upset punch to C with the left fist while maintaining a right walking stance toward C.	걷는서뒤집어지르기	geonneun seo dwijibeo jireugi
27	Move the right foot on line CD, forming a left walking stance toward D while striking the left palm with the right front elbow.	걷는서앞팔굽때리기	geonneun seo ap palgup ttaerigi
28	Jump to D, forming a right x-stance toward BD while executing a high block to D with the right double forearm.	뛰며겨차서두팔목높은데막기	ttwimyeo gyeocha seo dupalmok nopeunde makgi
29	Move the left foot to BC to form a sitting stance toward BD, at the same time executing a scooping block to BD with the right palm.	앉는서손바닥들어막기	anneun seo sonbadak deureo makgi
30	Execute a middle punch to BD with the left fist while maintaining a sitting stance toward BD. Perform 29 and 30 in a connecting motion.	앉는서앞지르기, 이어진동작	anneun seo ap jireugi, ieojin dongjak
31	Execute a front strike to BD with the right back fist while maintaining a sitting stance toward BD.	앉는서등주먹앞때리기	anneun seo deung jumeok ap ttaerigi
32	Move the left foot to C, forming a left walking stance toward C, executing a high front strike to C with the right reverse knife-hand.	걷는서손칼등데옆때앞때리기	geonneun seo sonkal deung de yeop ttae ap ttaerigi
33	Move the left foot to A about half a shoulder width while executing a middle turning kick to C with the right foot.	옮겨디디며가운데돌려차기	olgyeo didimyeo gaunde dollyeo chagi
34	Lower the right foot to C, and then turn counter-clockwise to form a left walking stance toward D, pivoting with the right foot while executing a high vertical punch to D with a twin fist.	걷는서쌍주먹높은데세워지르기	geonneun seo ssang jumeok nopeunde sewo jireugi
35	Execute a middle punch to D with the right middle knuckle fist, bringing the left side first in front of the right shoulder while forming a right L-stance toward D pulling the left foot.	ㄴ자서중지주먹가운데지르기	nieunja seo jungji jumeok gaunde jireugi
36	Move the right foot to D to form a sitting stance toward B, at the same time executing a left 9-shape block.	앉는서구자막기	anneun seo guja makgi
37	Execute a low guarding block to C with a reverse knife-hand while maintaining a sitting stance toward B.	앉는서손칼등낮은데대비막기	anneun seo sonkal deung najeunde daebi makgi
38	Execute a low guarding block to D with a knife-hand while maintaining a sitting stance toward B. Perform 37 and 38 in continuous motion.	앉는서손칼낮은데대비막기, 계속동작	anneun seo sonkal najeunde daebi makgi, gyesok dongjak
39	Move the left foot to D in a stamping motion to form a sitting stance toward A while executing a W-shape block with the outer forearm.	앉는서바깥팔목산막기	anneun seo bakkat palmok san makgi
40	Move the left foot to C in a stamping motion to form a sitting stance toward B while executing a W-shape block with the outer forearm.	앉는서바깥팔목산막기	anneun seo bakkat palmok san makgi
41	Move the right foot to C forming a right walking stance toward C while executing a rising block with the right forearm.	걷는서추켜막기	geonneun seo chukyeo makgi
42	Execute a middle punch to C with the left fist while maintaining a right walking stance toward C.	걷는서반대앞지르기	geonneun seo bandae ap jireugi
43	Move the right foot on line CD forming a left walking stance toward D while executing a rising block with the left forearm.	걷는서추켜막기	geonneun seo chukyeo makgi
44	Execute a middle punch to D with the right fist while maintaining a left walking stance toward D.	걷는서반대앞지르기	geonneun seo bandae ap jireugi
	Move the right foot to the parallel ready stance A facing D.	나란히준비서기	narani junbi seogi

== Trivia ==
- Ge-Baek is the only pattern referring to the kingdom of Baekje.
- The diagram of the pattern (|) is a straight line to symbolize Gyebaek's strict military discipline.
