= Saju jirugi =

First ITF Taekwon-Do beginner exercise

사주지르기
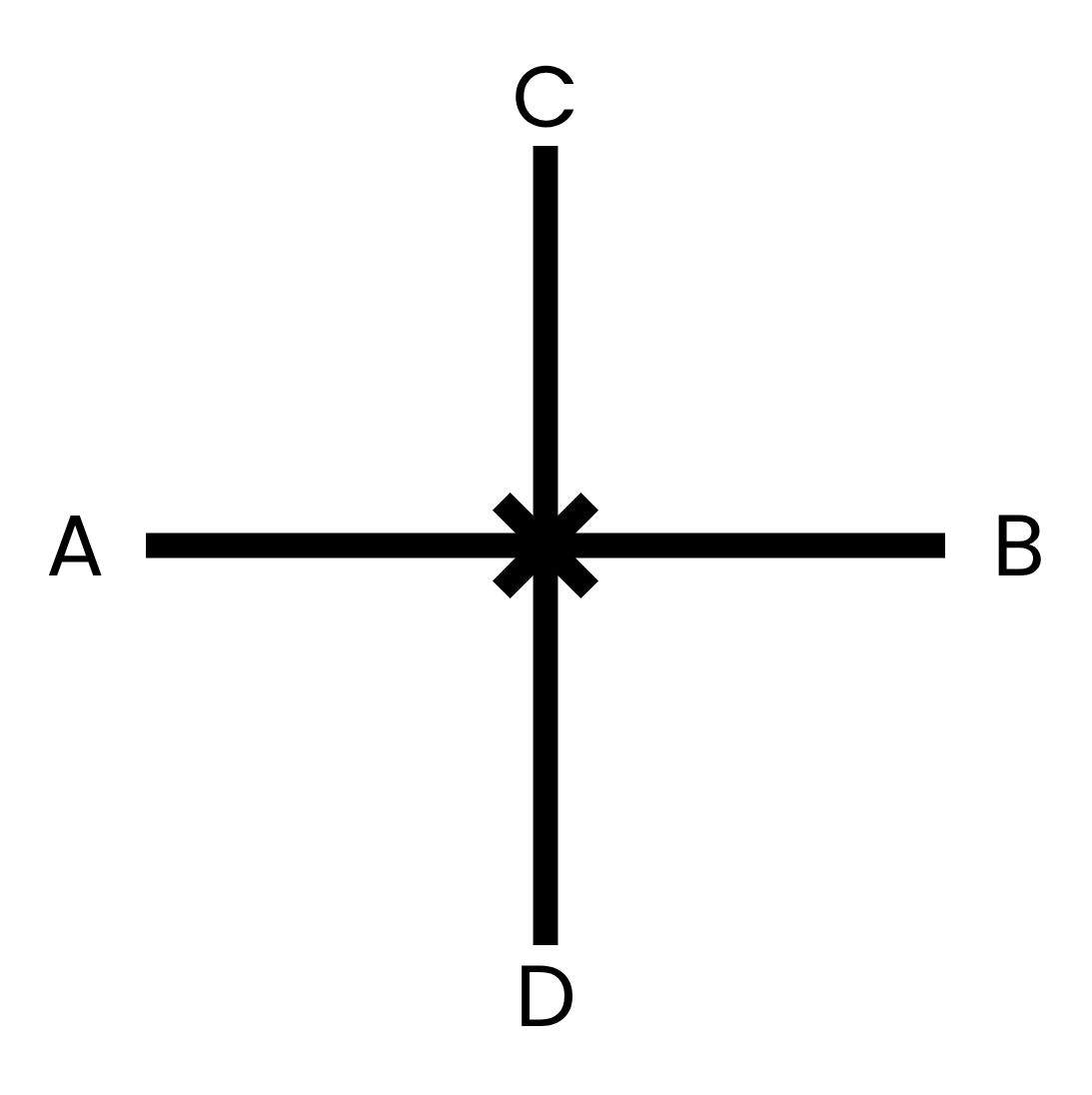
- Diagram of Cheon-Ji teul. Diagram of saju jirugi
- Movements: 14
- Begin stance: Parallel ready stance A
- Return foot: Left
- Meaning: Four-way punch
- Associated geup: 10th

Saju jirugi (Korean: 사주지르기; RR: saju jireugi; lit. 'four-way punch', Korean pronunciation: [sa.tɕu.tɕi.lɯ.ki]) is the first saju, as defined by the International Taekwon-Do Federation. The pattern consists of 14 movements and is taught to students with the 10th geup (white belt) and necessary to know to obtain the 9th geup (white-yellow belt).

Saju are beginner forms of teul and serve to prepare beginning Taekwon-Do students for the 24 teul, without forming part of this set of patterns. Concretely, the movements of saju jirugi are also present in Chon-Ji, the first teul. Saju makgi is another saju that is taught in preparation for Chon-Ji.

Saju jirugi is performed respectively counter-clockwise and clockwise, with all movements being repeated mirrored in the second part. In each part, one foot stays on the ground and the other foot moves in different directions.

== Movements ==
Nr.	English description	Korean description (in Hangul)	Korean description (in Revised Romanisation)
	Parallel ready stance A facing D	나란히준비서기	narani junbi seogi
1	Move the right foot to D forming a right walking stance toward D while executing a middle punch to D with the right fist.	걷는서앞지르기	geonneun seo ap jireugi
2	Move the right foot to A forming a left walking stance toward B while executing a low block to B with the left forearm.	걷는서팔목낮은데막기	geonneun seo palmok najeunde makgi
3	Move the right foot to B forming a right walking stance toward B while executing a middle punch to B with the right fist.	걷는서앞지르기	geonneun seo ap jireugi
4	Move the right foot to D forming a left walking stance toward C while executing a low block to C with the left forearm.	걷는서팔목낮은데막기	geonneun seo palmok najeunde makgi
5	Move the right foot to C forming a right walking stance toward C while executing a middle punch to C with the right fist.	걷는서앞지르기	geonneun seo ap jireugi
6	Move the right foot to A forming a right walking stance toward A while executing a middle punch to A with the right fist.	걷는서팔목낮은데막기	geonneun seo palmok najeunde makgi
7	Move the left foot to D forming a left walking stance toward D while executing a middle punch to D with the left fist.	걷는서앞지르기	geonneun seo ap jireugi
	Move the right foot to parallel ready stance A facing D.	나란히준비서기	narani junbi seogi
8	Move the left foot to D forming a left walking stance toward D while executing a middle punch to D with the left fist.	걷는서앞지르기	geonneun seo ap jireugi
9	Move the left foot to B forming a right walking stance toward A while executing a low block to A with the right forearm.	걷는서팔목낮은데막기	geonneun seo palmok najeunde makgi
10	Move the left foot to A forming a left walking stance toward A while executing a middle punch to A with the left fist.	걷는서앞지르기	geonneun seo ap jireugi
11	Move the left foot to D forming a right walking stance toward C while executing a low block to C with the left forearm.	걷는서팔목낮은데막기	geonneun seo palmok najeunde makgi
12	Move the left foot to D forming a left walking stance toward D while executing a middle punch to D with the left fist.	걷는서앞지르기	geonneun seo ap jireugi
13	Move the left foot to A forming a right walking stance toward B while executing a low block to B with the right forearm.	걷는서팔목낮은데막기	geonneun seo palmok najeunde makgi
14	Move the left foot to B forming a left walking stance toward B while executing a middle punch to B with the left fist.	걷는서앞지르기	geonneun seo ap jireugi
	Move the left foot to parallel ready stance A facing D.	나란히준비서기	narani junbi seogi
