= Saju makgi =

Second ITF Taekwon-Do beginner exercise

사주막기
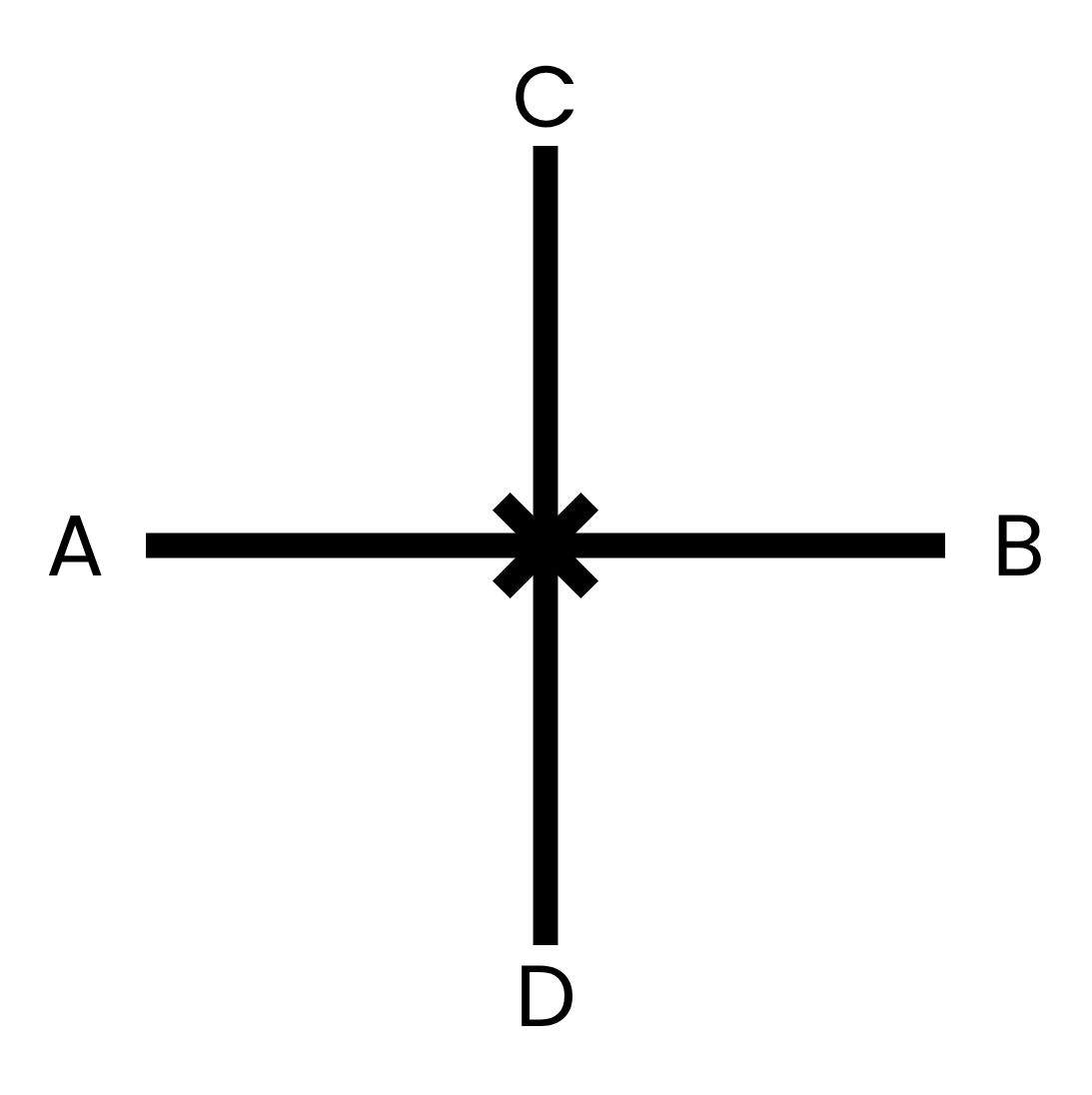
- Diagram of Cheon-Ji teul. Diagram of saju makgi
- Movements: 16
- Begin stance: Parallel ready stance A
- Return foot: Left
- Meaning: Four-way block
- Associated geup: 10th

Saju makgi (Korean: 사주막기; RR: saju makgi; lit. 'four-way block', Korean pronunciation: [sa.tɕu.mak.ˀki]) is the second saju, as defined by the International Taekwon-Do Federation. The pattern consists of 16 movements and is taught to students with the 10th geup (white belt) and necessary to know to obtain the 9th geup (white-yellow belt).

Saju are beginner forms of teul and serve to prepare beginning Taekwon-Do students for the 24 teul, without forming part of this set of patterns. Concretely, the movements of saju makgi are also present in Chon-Ji, the first teul. Saju jirugi is another saju that is taught in preparation for Chon-Ji.

Saju makgi is performed respectively counter-clockwise and clockwise, with all movements being repeated mirrored in the second part. In each part, one foot stays on the ground and the other foot moves in different directions.

== Movements ==
Nr.	English description	Korean description (in Hangul)	Korean description (in Revised Romanisation)
	Parallel ready stance A facing D	나란히준비서기	narani junbi seogi
1	Move the right foot to C forming a left walking stance toward D while executing a low block to D with the left knife-hand.	걷는서손칼낮은데막기	geonneun seo sonkal najeunde makgi
2	Move the right foot to D forming a right walking stance toward D while executing a middle side block to D with the right inner forearm.	걷는서안팔목가운데옆막기	geonneun seo an palmok gaunde yeop makgi
3	Move the right foot to A forming a left walking stance toward B while executing a low block to B with the left knife-hand.	걷는서손칼낮은데막기	geonneun seo sonkal najeunde makgi
4	Move the right foot to B forming a right walking stance toward B while executing a middle side block to B with the right inner forearm.	걷는서안팔목가운데옆막기	geonneun seo an palmok gaunde yeop makgi
5	Move the right foot to D forming a left walking stance toward C while executing a low block to C with the left knife-hand.	걷는서손칼낮은데막기	geonneun seo sonkal najeunde makgi
6	Move the right foot to C forming a right walking stance toward C while executing a middle side block to C with the right inner forearm.	걷는서안팔목가운데옆막기	geonneun seo an palmok gaunde yeop makgi
7	Move the right foot to B forming a left walking stance toward A while executing a low block to A with the left knife-hand.	걷는서손칼낮은데막기	geonneun seo sonkal najeunde makgi
8	Move the right foot to A forming a right walking stance toward A while executing a middle side block to A with the right inner forearm.	걷는서안팔목가운데옆막기	geonneun seo an palmok gaunde yeop makgi
	Move the right foot to parallel ready stance A facing D.	나란히준비서기	narani junbi seogi
9	Move the left foot to C forming a right walking stance toward D while executing a low block to D with the right knife-hand.	걷는서손칼낮은데막기	geonneun seo sonkal najeunde makgi
10	Move the left foot to D forming a left walking stance toward D while executing a middle side block to D with the left inner forearm.	걷는서안팔목가운데옆막기	geonneun seo an palmok gaunde yeop makgi
11	Move the left foot to A forming a right walking stance toward B while executing a low block to B with the right knife-hand.	걷는서손칼낮은데막기	geonneun seo sonkal najeunde makgi
12	Move the left foot to B forming a left walking stance toward B while executing a middle side block to B with the left inner forearm.	걷는서안팔목가운데옆막기	geonneun seo an palmok gaunde yeop makgi
13	Move the left foot to D forming a right walking stance toward C while executing a low block to C with the right knife-hand.	걷는서손칼낮은데막기	geonneun seo sonkal najeunde makgi
14	Move the left foot to C forming a left walking stance toward C while executing a middle side block to C with the left inner forearm.	걷는서안팔목가운데옆막기	geonneun seo an palmok gaunde yeop makgi
15	Move the left foot to B forming a right walking stance toward A while executing a low block to A with the right knife-hand.	걷는서손칼낮은데막기	geonneun seo sonkal najeunde makgi
16	Move the left foot to A forming a left walking stance toward A while executing a middle side block to A with the left inner forearm.	걷는서안팔목가운데옆막기	geonneun seo an palmok gaunde yeop makgi
	Move the left foot to parallel ready stance A facing D.	나란히준비서기	narani junbi seogi
