= Eui-Am (teul) =

Thirteenth ITF Taekwon-Do pattern

13. Eui-Am
의암
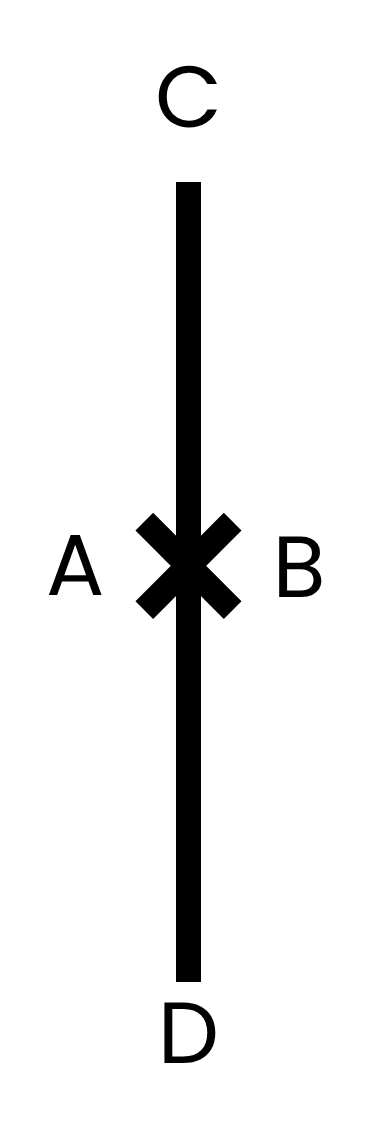
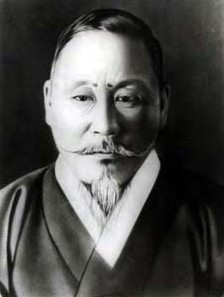
- Diagram of Eui-Am Son Byong-hi
- Movements: 45
- Begin stance: Closed ready stance D
- Return foot: Right
- Meaning: Son Byong-hi
- Associated dan: 2nd

Eui-Am (Korean: 의암; RR: Uiam, Korean pronunciation: [ɯj.am]) is the thirteenth Taekwon-Do teul, as defined by the International Taekwon-Do Federation. The pattern consists of 45 movements and is taught to students with the 2nd dan (black belt) and necessary to know to obtain the 3rd dan.

== Meaning ==
The pattern's name refers to Son Byeonghui (religious name Uiam), a religious leader of Tonghak and an independence activist during the Japanese colonization of Korea. Son was involved in the organization of the March First Movement, was the first person to sign the Korean Declaration of Independence, and read this declaration out loud during the same protest. His prominence previous to and during the First March Movement made him one of the most famous rebels against Japanese occupation.

=== Number of movements ===
Eui-Am has 45 movements because Son renamed Tonghak to Cheondoism when he was 45 years old. The new name emphasized its religious status and de-emphasized its previous political activism, which Son opposed.

== Movements ==
Nr.	English description	Korean description (in Hangul)	Korean description (in Revised Romanisation)
	Closed ready stance D facing D	모아준비서기	moa junbi seogi
1	Move the right foot to C forming a left walking stance toward D while executing a low inward block to D with the right knife-hand.	걷는서손칼낮은데반대안으로막기	geonneun seo sonkal najeunde bandae aneuro makgi
2	Move the left foot to C forming a right walking stance toward D while executing a high side block to D with the left outer forearm.	걷는서바깥팔목높은데반대옆막기	geonneun seo bakkat palmok nopeunde bandae yeop makgi
3	Execute a middle punch to D with the right fist while maintaining a right walking stance toward D.	걷는서앞지르기	geonneun seo ap jireugi
4	Execute a low twisting kick to D with the left foot keeping the position of the hands as they were in 3.	낮은데비틀어차기	najeunde biteureo chagi
5	Lower the left foot to D forming a left walking stance toward D while executing a downward block with an x-fist.	걷는서교차주먹내려막기	geonneun seo gyocha jumeok naeryeo makgi
6	Execute a rising block with the right knife-hand, maintaining a left walking stance toward D. Perform 5 and 6 in a continuous motion.	걷는서손칼반대추켜막기, 계속동작	geonneun seo sonkal bandae chukyeo makgi, gyesok dongjak
7	Jump to D, forming a right x-stance toward BD while executing a high side strike to D with the right back fist bringing the left finger belly to the right side fist.	뛰며겨차서등주먹높은데옆때리기	ttwimyeo gyeocha seo deung jumeok nopeunde yeop ttaerigi
8	Move the left foot to C forming a right L-stance toward C while executing a middle punch to C with the left fist.	ㄴ자서반대지르기	nieunja seo bandae jireugi
9	Execute a middle reverse turning kick to AC with the right foot.	가운데반대돌려차기	gaunde bandae dollyeo chagi
10	Lower the right foot to C in a stamping motion to form a sitting stance toward A while executing a middle side strike to C with the right knife-hand.	구르며앉는서손칼옆때리기	gureumyeo anneun seo sonkal yeop ttaerigi
11	Execute a middle side piercing kick to C with the left foot while turning clockwise pulling both hands in the opposite direction.	가운데옆차지르기	gaunde yeop cha jireugi
12	Lower the left foot to C forming a left walking stance toward C while executing a high crescent punch with the right fist.	걷는서높은데반대반달지르기	geonneun seo nopeunde bandae bandal jireugi
13	Execute a middle turning punch with the left fist while forming a parallel stance toward C pulling the right foot. Perform in slow motion.	나란히서데돌려지르기, 느린동작	narani seo de dollyeo jireugi, neurin dongjak
14	Move the left foot to D forming a right walking stance toward C while executing a low inward block with the left knife-hand.	걷는서손칼낮은데반대안으로막기	geonneun seo sonkal najeunde bandae aneuro makgi
15	Move the right foot to D forming a left walking stance toward C at the same time executing a high side block to C with the right outer forearm.	걷는서바깥팔목높은데반대옆막기	geonneun seo bakkat palmok nopeunde bandae yeop makgi
16	Execute a middle punch to C with the left fist while maintaining a left walking stance toward C.	걷는서앞지르기	geonneun seo ap jireugi
17	Execute a low twisting kick to C with the right foot, keeping the position of the hands as they were in 16.	낮은데비틀어차기	najeunde biteureo chagi
18	Lower the right foot to C forming a right waling stance toward C while executing a downward block with an x-fist.	걷는서교차주먹내려막기	geonneun seo gyocha jumeok naeryeo makgi
19	Execute a rising block with the left knife-hand while maintaining a right walking stance toward C. Perform 18 and 19 in a continuous motion.	걷는서손칼반대추켜막기, 계속동작	geonneun seo sonkal bandae chukyeo makgi, gyesok dongjak
20	Jump to C forming a left x-stance toward BC while executing a high side strike to C with the left back fist and bringing the right finger belly to the left side fist.	뛰며겨차서등주먹높은데옆때리기	ttwimyeo gyeocha seo deung jumeok nopeunde yeop ttaerigi
21	Move the right foot to D, forming a left L-stance toward D while executing a middle punch to D with the right fist.	ㄴ자서반대지르기	nieunja seo bandae jireugi
22	Execute a middle reverse turning kick to AD with the left foot.	가운데반대돌려차기	gaunde bandae dollyeo chagi
23	Lower the left foot to D in a stamping motion to form a sitting stance toward A at the same time executing a middle side strike to D with a left knife-hand.	구르며앉는서손칼옆때리기	gureumyeo anneun seo sonkal yeop ttaerigi
24	Execute a middle side piercing kick to D with the right foot while turning counter-clockwise pulling both hands in the opposite direction.	가운데옆차지르기	gaunde yeop cha jireugi
25	Lower the right foot to D forming a right walking stance toward D while executing a high crescent punch with the left fist.	걷는서높은데반대반달지르기	geonneun seo nopeunde bandae bandal jireugi
26	Execute a middle turning punch with the right fist while forming a parallel stance toward D pulling the left foot. Perform in slow motion.	나란히서데돌려지르기, 느린동작	narani seo de dollyeo jireugi, neurin dongjak
27	Move the right foot to D forming a right walking stance toward D at the same time executing a middle wedging block with a knife-hand.	걷는서손칼가운데헤쳐막기	geonneun seo sonkal gaunde hechyeo makgi
28	Execute a circular block to BD with the left reverse knife-hand while maintaining a right walking stance toward D.	걷는서손칼등돌리며막기	geonneun seo sonkal deung dollimyeo makgi
29	Execute a downward block with an alternate palm while forming a left rear foot stance toward D pulling the right foot.	뒷발서엇갈린손바닥내려막기	dwitbal seo eotgallin sonbadak naeryeo makgi
30	Execute a middle punch to D with the left fist while forming a left L-stance toward D slipping the right foot.	ㄴ자서바로앞지르기	nieunja seo baro ap jireugi
31	Execute a low inward block to D with the right reverse knife-hand while shifting to C maintaining a left L-stance toward D.	잦은발, ㄴ자서손칼등낮은데반대안으로막기	jajeunbal, nieunja seo sonkal deung najeunde bandae aneuro makgi
32	Move the left foot to D forming a left walking stance toward D while executing a middle wedging block with a knife-hand.	걷는서손칼가운데헤쳐막기	geonneun seo sonkal gaunde hechyeo makgi
33	Execute a circular block to AD with the right reverse knife-hand while maintaining a left walking stance toward D.	걷는서손칼등돌리며막기	geonneun seo sonkal deung dollimyeo makgi
34	Execute a downward block with an alternate palm while forming a right rear foot stance toward D pulling left foot.	뒷발서엇갈린손바닥내려막기	dwitbal seo eotgallin sonbadak naeryeo makgi
35	Execute a middle punch to D with the right fist while forming a right L-stance toward D slipping the left foot.	ㄴ자서바로앞지르기	nieunja seo baro ap jireugi
36	Execute a low inward block to D with the left reverse knife-hand while shifting to C maintaining a right L-stance toward D.	잦은발, ㄴ자서손칼등낮은데반대안으로막기	jajeunbal, nieunja seo sonkal deung najeunde bandae aneuro makgi
37	Execute a high reverse turning kick to BD with the right foot.	높은데반대돌려차기	nopeunde bandae dollyeo chagi
38	Lower the right foot to D forming a left rear foot stance toward D while executing a middle guarding block to D with the forearm.	뒷발서대비막기	dwitbal seo daebi makgi
39	Execute a high reverse turning kick to AD with the left foot.	높은데반대돌려차기	nopeunde bandae dollyeo chagi
40	Lower the left foot to D forming a right rear foot stance toward D while executing a middle guarding block to D with the forearm.	뒷발서대비막기	dwitbal seo daebi makgi
41	Move the left foot to the side rear of the right foot and then the right foot to C forming a right L-stance toward D while executing a low outward block to D with the left knife-hand.	이보옮겨디디며들어오기ㄴ자서손칼낮은데막기	ibo olgyeo didimyeo deureogi nieunja seo sonkal najeunde makgi
42	Execute a middle punch to D with the right fist while forming a left walking stance toward D slipping the right foot.	걷는서반대앞지르기	geonneun seo bandae ap jireugi
43	Move the left foot to C forming a left L-stance toward D while executing a low block to D with the right knife-hand.	ㄴ자서손칼낮은데막기	nieunja seo sonkal najeunde makgi
44	Execute a middle punch to D with the left fist while forming a right walking stance toward D slipping the left foot.	걷는서반대앞지르기	geonneun seo bandae ap jireugi
45	Execute a high punch to D with the right fist while maintaining a right walking stance toward D.	걷는서높은데앞지르기	geonneun seo nopeunde ap jireugi
	Move the right foot to the closed ready stance D facing D.	모아준비서기	moa junbi seogi

== Trivia ==
- Eui-Am is one of the patterns that refers to the era of colonisation of Korea by Japan, next to Do-San, Joong-Gun, Ko-Dang, and Sam-Il.
- The diagram of the pattern (|) is a straight line to symbolize Son's dedication to his country.
