= U-Nam (teul) =

Former ITF Taekwon-Do pattern

고당
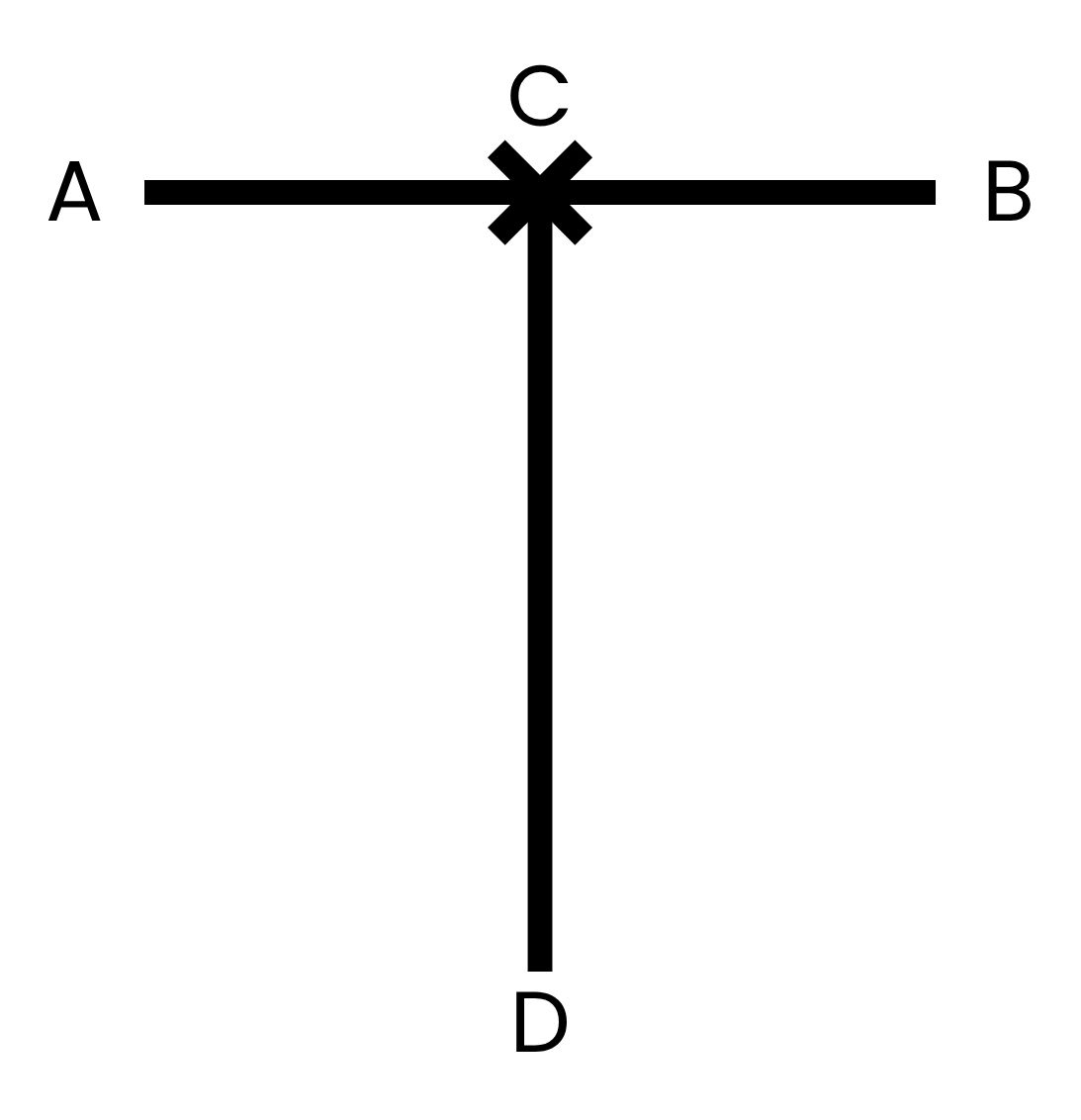
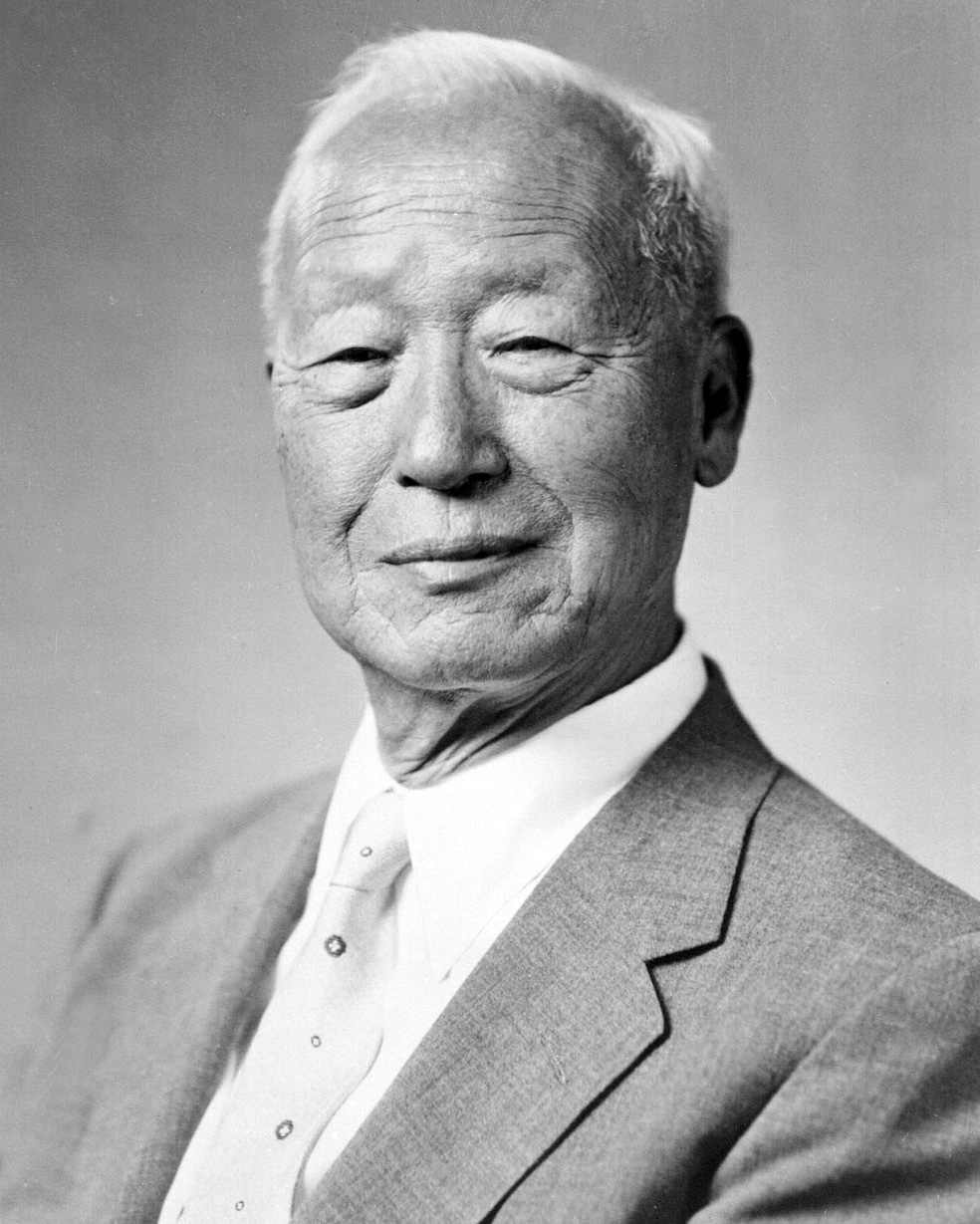
- Diagram of U-Nam Syngman Rhee
- Movements: 42
- Begin stance: Closed ready stance A
- Return foot: Left
- Meaning: Syngman Rhee
- Associated dan: 4th or higher

U-Nam or Woo-Nam (Note: Both 'U-Nam' and 'Woo-Nam' have been used in sources about the pattern. However, 'U-Nam' is preferable because it follows the spelling of Revised Romanization of Korean.) (Korean: 우남; RR: Unam, Korean pronunciation: [u.nam]) is a former Taekwon-Do teul, as defined by the International Taekwon-Do Federation (ITF). The pattern consists of 42 movements and was designed to be taught to students with 4th dan (black belt) or higher.

== History ==
The pattern was first mentioned in the first Taekwon-Do textbook by general Choi Hong-hi, published in 1959. The book described all teul until the 4th dan, and U-Nam was mentioned as a pattern that was learned above the 4th dan, concretely as the 24th. The pattern disappeared in the second edition of the textbook (1960) and was not published in any further edition, giving the pattern the nickname 'the forgotten teul'.

General Choi presumably included a pattern named after the president of South Korea to secure financial and institutional support, as Taekwon-Do was still a developing martial art. In April 1960, Rhee resigned after backlash about his violent suppression of student protests, and general Choi subsequently removed U-Nam from the Taekwon-Do curriculum. Many movements were integrated in Choong-Jang.

== Meaning ==
The pattern is named after Syngman Rhee (pen name Unam), a capitalist dictator and the first president of South Korea. During the Japanese occupation of Korea, he was an independence activist and lived for a long time in the United States. After World War II and the Division of Korea, Rhee was appointed by the US government in Korea as the first president of independent South Korea for his anti-communist and pro-American views. During his presidency, peaceful protests, most famously the April Revolution, were violently suppressed, while there were no free elections and political opponents were kidnapped and killed.

It is unclear what the 42 movements in U-Nam symbolize.

== Movements ==
| Nr. | English description | Korean description (in Hangul) | Korean description (in Revised Romanisation) |
|---|---|---|---|
| | Closed ready stance A facing D | 모아준비서기 | moa junbi seogi |
| 1 | Move the right foot to A, forming a sitting stance while at the same time, execute a high block to A with the right outer forearm and a low block to D with the left outer forearm. | 앉는서바깥팔목높은데막기, 팔목낮은데막기 | anneun seo bakkat palmok nopeunde makgi, palmok najeunde makgi |
| 2 | Change the positions of the hands to the opposite side. | 앉는서바깥팔목높은데막기, 팔목낮은데막기 | anneun seo bakkat palmok nopeunde makgi, palmok najeunde makgi |
| 3 | Bring the right foot to the left foot, forming a close stance toward D while bringing the left fist in front of the right chest horizontally and the right fist to the right waist. Perform in a slow motion. | 모아서앞주먹ㄱ자지르기, 느린동작 | moa seo ap jumeok nieunja jireugi, neurin dongjak |
| 4 | Move the left foot to D, forming a left walking stance while executing a high vertical punch to D with the twin fists. | 걷는서쌍주먹높이세워지르기 | geonneun seo ssang jumeok nopi sewo jireugi |
| 5 | Move the right foot to D, forming a right walking stance while executing a front strike to D with the right back fist and bringing back the left back hand under the right elbow. | 걷는서등주먹앞때리기 | geonneun seo deung jumeok ap ttaerigi |
| 6 | Execute a high strike to C with the right back fist and low block to D with the left outer forearm. | 걷는서등주먹앞때리기, 팔목반대낮은데막기 | geonneun seo deung jumeok ap ttaerigi, palmok bandae najeunde makgi |
| 7 | Move the left foot to D, forming a left walking stance while executing a rising block to D with the left outer forearm. | 걷는서추켜막기 | geonneun seo chukyeo makgi |
| 8 | Move the right foot to D, forming a right walking stance while executing a high punch to D with the right fist. | 걷는서높은데앞지르기 | geonneun seo nopeunde ap jireugi |
| 9 | Move counterclockwise, turning counterclockwise to form a right L-stance toward D, at the same time, execute a middle guarding block with the forearm. | 뒤로옮겨디디며미끌며돌기고정서팔목가운데막기 | dwiro olgyeo didimyeo mikkeulmyeo dolgi gojeong seo palmok gaunde makgi |
| 10 | Execute a low front kick to D with the right foot. | 낮은데앞차부시기 | najeunde ap cha busigi |
| 11 | Lower the right foot to D, forming a right low walking stance, at the same time, execute a middle punch to D with the right fist. | 낮춰서높은데앞지르기 | natchwo seo nopeunde ap jireugi |
| 12 | Lower the body to touch the ground with both hands using the left knee to support the body, at the same time, execute a high-turning kick to D with the right foot. | 몸낮추며높은데돌려차기 | mom natchumyeo nopeunde dollyeo chagi |
| 13 | Lower the right foot to the ground and then execute a high punch to D with the right fist while pressing the ground with the left hand. | 몸낮추며높은데앞지르기 | mom natchumyeo nopeunde ap jireugi |
| 14 | Stand up and move the left foot to D, forming a left L-stance toward C, at the same time, thrust to D with the left side elbow. | 낮춰서윗팔굽때리기 | natchwo seo wit palgup ttaerigi |
| 15 | Move the left foot to C, turning clockwise to form a left L-stance, at the same time, execute a middle strike to D with the right knife-hand. | ㄴ자서손칼옆때리기 | nieunja seo sonkal yeop ttaerigi |
| 16 | Move the right foot to C, forming a right L-stance, at the same time, execute a scooping block to D with the left palm. | ㄴ자서손바닥반대들어막기 | nieunja seo sonbadak bandae deureo makgi |
| 17 | Move the left foot to C, forming a left L-stance, at the same time, execute a middle block to D with the knife-hand. | ㄴ자서손칼옆때리기 | nieunja seo sonkal yeop ttaerigi |
| 18 | Move the left foot to D, forming a left walking stance, at the same time, execute a pressing block with the x-fist. | 걷는서교차주먹눌러막기 | geonneun seo gyocha jumeok nulleo makgi |
| 19 | Execute a front kick to D with the right knee while pulling both hands in the opposite direction as if grabbing the opponent. | 무릎낮은데앞차부시기 | mureup najeunde ap cha busigi |
| 20 | Move the right foot to C, forming a right L-stance while executing a left middle knife-hand strike to D. | ㄴ자서손칼옆때리기 | nieunja seo sonkal yeop ttaerigi |
| 21 | Move the right foot to D, forming a right L-stance toward C in a sliding motion while executing a right elbow strike to D. | 미끌며낮춰자서때팔굽뚫기 | mikkeulmyeo natchwo seo ttae palgup ttulki |
| 22 | Bring the left foot to the right knee joint toward D, forming a right one-leg stance, at the same time, bringing both fists to the right waist. | 구부려서기 | guburyeo seogi |
| 23 | Execute a side kick to B. | 가운데옆차지르기, 수평때리기 | gaunde yeop cha jireugi, supyeong ttaerigi |
| 24 | Lower the left foot to D, forming a right L-stance while executing a pressing block to D with the twin palms. | ㄴ자서쌍손바닥눌러막기 | nieunja seo ssang sonbadak nulleo makgi |
| 25 | Move the right foot to D, forming a right walking stance while executing a high front block to D with the outer forearm followed by a high side strike to D with the right back fist. | 걷는서바깥팔목높은데앞막기, 걷는서등주먹높은데옆때리기 | geonneun seo bakkat palmok nopeunde ap makgi, geonneun seo deung jumeok nopeunde yeop ttaerigi |
| 26 | Move the right foot to C, forming a right L-stance while executing a high thrust to D with a left hand flat fingertip thrust. | 낮춰서엎은손끝높은데반대뚫기 | natchwo seo eopeun sonkkeut nopeunde bandae ttulki |
| 27 | Execute a front kick to D with the right foot while bringing the right hand palm on top of the left back hand. | 낮은데앞차부시기 | najeunde ap cha busigi |
| 28 | Lower the right foot to D, forming a left walking stance toward C, pivoting counter clockwise with the left foot while bringing both fists to the right waist. | 걷는서뒷팔굽반대뚫기 | geonneun seo dwit palgup bandae ttulki |
| 29 | Move the right foot to C in a stamping motion, turning counter- clockwise to form a sitting stance toward A while executing a W-shape block with the outer forearm. | 앉는서바깥팔목산막기 | anneun seo bakkat palmok san makgi |
| 30 | Move the left foot to C, forming a left walking stance while executing a rising block with the left forearm. | 걷는서추켜막기 | geonneun seo chukyeo makgi |
| 31 | Move the right foot to D in a sliding motion, forming a right L-stance toward C while executing an x-fist block. | 미끌며ㄴ자서교차주먹막기 | mikkeulmyeo nieunja seo gyocha jumeok makgi |
| 32 | Move the right foot to C, forming a right walking stance while executing a rising block with the right forearm. | 걷는서추켜막기 | geonneun seo chukyeo makgi |
| 33 | Move the left foot to C, forming a left walking stance while executing a rising block with the left forearm. | 걷는서추켜막기 | geonneun seo chukyeo makgi |
| 34 | Move the right foot to C, forming a right walking stance while executing a rising block with the right forearm. | 걷는서추켜막기 | geonneun seo chukyeo makgi |
| 35 | Execute a side kick to C with the left foot. | 옆차지르기 | yeop cha jireugi |
| 36 | Lower the foot to C forming a left walking stance and execute a middle punch to C with the right fist. | 걷는서반대앞지르기 | geonneun seo bandae ap jireugi |
| 37 | Execute a middle punch to C with the left fist. | 걷는서앞지르기 | geonneun seo ap jireugi |
| 38 | Move the right foot to C, forming a right L-stance toward D while executing a thrust to C with the right elbow. | ㄴ자서팔굽뚫기 | nieunja seo palgup ttulki |
| 39 | Move the left foot to B, turning counter-clockwise to form a fixed stance toward B while executing a U-shape grasp block. | 뒤로옮겨디디며고정서ㄷ자잡기막기 | dwiro olgyeo didimyeo gojeong seo digeutja japgi makgi |
| 40 | Move the right foot to B, forming a right walking stance while executing a high block to B with the left inner forearm and low block with the right outer forearm at the same time. | 걷는서안팔목높은데막기, 바깥팔목낮은데막기 | geonneun seo an palmok nopeunde makgi, bakkat palmok najeunde makgi |
| 41 | Move the right foot to A, turning clockwise to form a left L-stance while executing a middle guarding block with the knife-hand. | ㄴ자서손칼대비막기 | nieunja seo sonkal daebi makgi |
| 42 | Move the left foot to A, forming a left walking stance while executing a middle thrust with the left straight fingertip and blocking downwards with the right palm under the left elbow. | 걷는서선손끝뚫기 | geonneun seo seonsonkkeut ttulki |
| | Bring the left foot back to closed ready stance A facing D. | 모아준비서기 | moa junbi seogi |

== Trivia ==
- U-Nam is one of two patterns that refer to the Division of Korea period, the other one being Juche.
