= Ko-Dang (teul) =

Former ITF Taekwon-Do pattern

고당
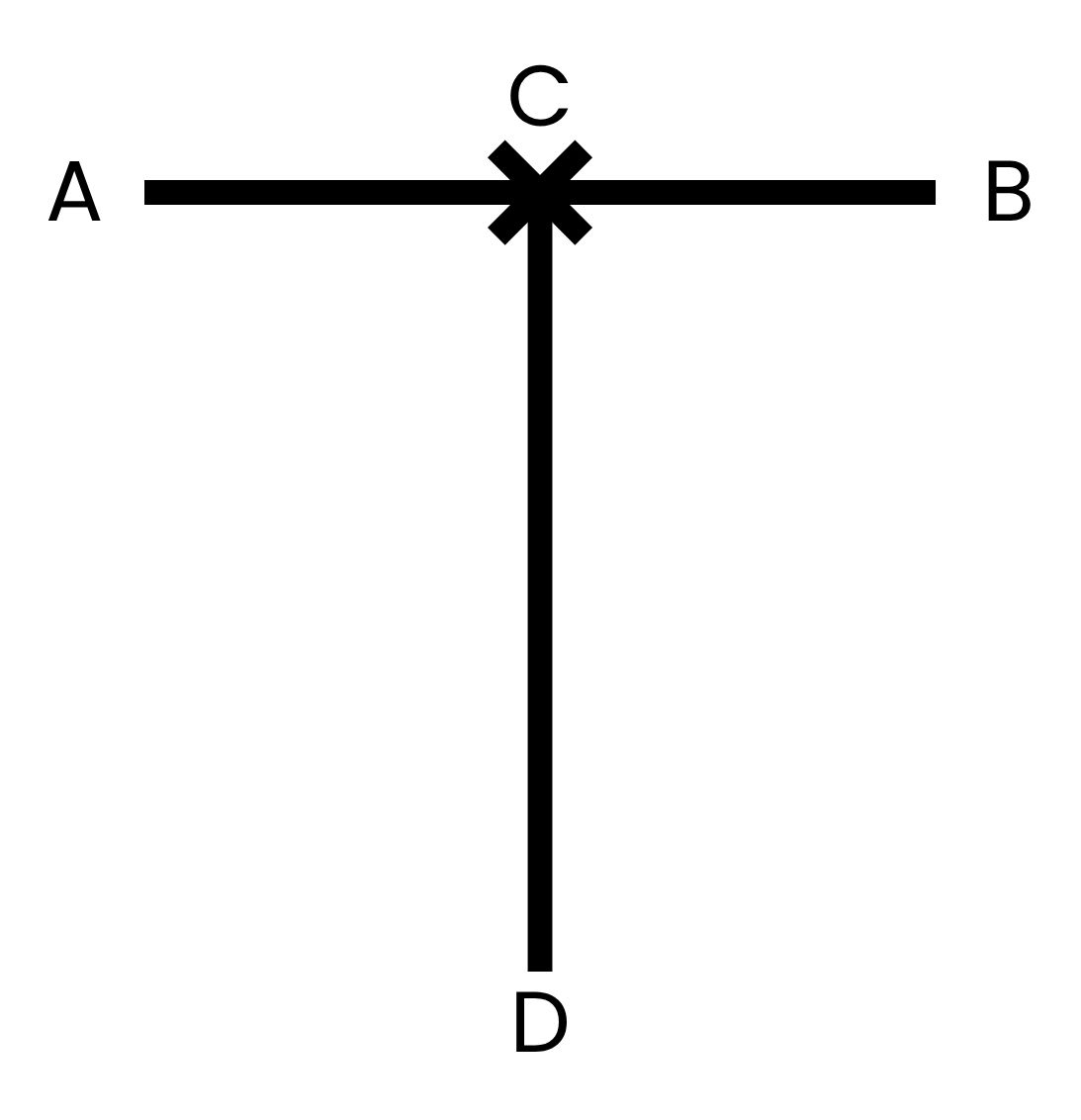
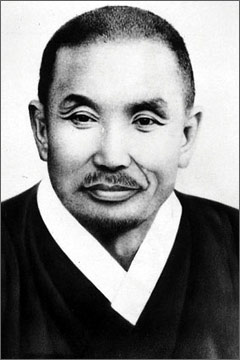
- Diagram of Ko-Dang Jo Mansik
- Movements: 39
- Begin stance: Closed ready stance C
- Return foot: Left
- Meaning: Jo Mansik
- Associated dan: 2nd

Ko-Dang (Korean: 고당; RR: Godang, Korean pronunciation: [ko.taŋ]) is a former Taekwon-Do teul, as defined by the International Taekwon-Do Federation (ITF). The pattern, which has been replaced by Juche, consists of 39 movements and was taught to students with the 2nd dan (black belt) and necessary to know to obtain the 3rd dan.

The ITF recognizes Ko-Dang as a former teul, but there exist Taekwon-Do federations and schools that still practise it due to their opposition to Juche. Among these schools, some practise the movements of Juche but call the pattern Ko-Dang, and some practise the former pattern of Ko-Dang.

== History ==
Ko-Dang was designed in the 1960s as one of the 24 teul, but was removed from the Taekwon-Do curriculum in the early 1980s to make place for Juche. The official reason for the replacement of Ko-Dang was that the existing patterns lacked new advanced techniques. General Choi Hong-hi proposed the introduction of a new pattern and believed that a new teul could best be introduced for second-degree students, as he considered this level to be the physical peak for most students. Out of the three patterns for second degree, Ko-Dang was named after the youngest patriot (the other people being Son Byeonghui and Kim Deokryeong).

However, it is generally agreed that Juche was introduced as a pattern to secure financial support from North Korea. As long as ITF Taekwon-Do maintained Ko-Dang, named after Kim Il Sung's former political rival Jo Mansik, the North Korean authorities were not open to sustain the Taekwon-Do governing body. Initially, Kim Il Sung wanted to have the entire sport renamed to 'Juche Taekwon-Do', so the proposal to only rename a pattern after North Korea's state ideology was considered a compromise. After this deal, Juche was devised in the early 1980s and introduced as an official teul somewhere between 1983 and 1985.

== Meaning ==
The pattern is named after Jo Mansik (pen name Godang), a 20th-century Korean independence activist and politician. He became involved in non-violent activism after the start of Japanese occupation of Korea, participated in the March First Movement, and promoted the idea of Korean economic self-sufficiency. In 1945, he joined the first cabinet of the People's Republic of Korea, founded the Korean Social Democratic Party, and had become a popular politician. However, after his opposition to the Soviet Civil Administration, he was arrested by the new communist authorities and disappeared in the North Korean prison system.

=== Number of movements ===
The 39 movements in Ko-Dang refer to both the number of times Jo Mansik was imprisoned and his birthplace (in Kangseo county) close to the 39th parallel.

== Movements ==
Nr.	English description	Korean description (in Hangul)	Korean description (in Revised Romanisation)
	Form a closed ready stance C facing D.	모아준비서기	moa junbi seogi
1	Step the right foot to AC to form sitting stance, while executing a middle pushing block with a left palm.	앉는서손바닥미어막기	annuen seo sonbadak mireo makgi
2	Execute a middle punch with the right fist, while maintaining the sitting stance to AC.	앉는서앞주먹지르기	anneun seo ap jumeok jireugi
3	Move the right foot on line CD to form a right L-stance and execute a middle guarding block with the forearm.	ㄴ자서팔목대비막기	nieunja seo palmok daebi makgi
4	Execute a low block with the right forearm as well as a middle side block with the left inner forearm.	ㄴ자서안팔목가운데막기, 바깥팔목낮은데막기	nieunja seo an palmok gaunde makgi bakkat palmok najunde makgi
5	Move the left foot to BC to form a sitting stance, while executing a middle pushing block with a right palm.	앉는서손바닥미어막기	annuen seo sonbadak mireo makgi
6	Execute a middle punch with the left fist, while maintaining the sitting stance to BC.	앉는서앞주먹지르기	anneun seo ap jumeok jireugi
7	Move the left foot on line CD to form a left L-stance and execute a middle guarding block with the forearm.	ㄴ자서팔목대비막기	nieunja seo palmok daebi makgi
8	Execute a low block with the left forearm as well as a middle side block with the right inner forearm.	ㄴ자서안팔목가운데막기, 바깥팔목낮은데막기	nieunja seo an palmok gaunde makgi bakkat palmok najunde makgi
9	Turn the face toward C and form a left bending ready stance B.	구부려준비서기	guburyeo junbi seogi
10	Execute a right middle back piercing kick to C.	가운데뒷차지르기	gaunde dwit cha jireugi
11	Lower the right foot to C, form a right L-stance toward D, and execute a middle block with a left knife-hand.	ㄴ자서손칼가운데막기	nieunja seo sonkal gaunde makgi
12	Turn the face toward C and form a right bending ready stance B.	구부려준비서기	guburyeo junbi seogi
13	Execute a left middle back piercing kick to C.	가운데뒷차지르기	gaunde dwit cha jireugi
14	Lower the left foot to C, form a left L-stance toward D, and execute a middle block with a right knife-hand.	ㄴ자서손칼가운데막기	nieunja seo sonkal gaunde makgi
15	Step with the right foot to C, form a right L-stance, and execute a downward thrust with a left straight elbow.	ㄴ자서선팔굽내려뚫기	nieunja seo seon palgup naeryeo ttulki
16	Step with the left foot to C, form a left L-stance, and execute a downward thrust with a right straight elbow.	ㄴ자서선팔굽내려뚫기	nieunja seo seon palgup naeryeo ttulki
17	Step with the left foot to D to form a left walking stance and execute a pressing block with a right palm. Perform in a slow motion.	걷는서손바닥눌러막기	geonneun seo sonbadak nulleo makgi
18	Step with the right foot to D to form a right walking stance and execute a pressing block with a left palm. Perform in a slow motion.	걷는서손바닥눌러막기	geonneun seo sonbadak nulleo makgi
19	Step with the right foot to C to form a right L-stance and execute a downward block with the left outer forearm.	ㄴ자서바깥팔목내려막기	nieunja seo bakkat palmok naeryeo makgi
20	Step with the right foot to D to form a left L-stance and execute a downward block with the right outer forearm.	ㄴ자서바깥팔목내려막기	nieunja seo bakkat palmok naeryeo makgi
21	Step with the left foot to D to form a right rear foot stance and execute an upward block with a left palm.	뒷발서손바닥올려막기	dwitbal seo sonbadak ollyeo makgi
22	Step with the right foot to D to form a left rear foot stance and execute an upward block with a right palm.	뒷발서손바닥올려막기	dwitbal seo sonbadak ollyeo makgi
23	Step with the right foot to C to form a right rear foot stance and execute a left middle front snap kick, while keeping the position of the hands as they were in 22.	뒷발서손바닥올려막기, 가운데앞차부수기	dwitbal seo sonbadak ollyeo makgi gaunde ap cha busugi
24	Lower the left foot to D to form a left walking stance and execute a high inward strike with both knife-hands.	건는서쌍손칼안으로때리기	geonneun seo ssang sonkal aneuro ttaerigi
25	Maintain the left walking stance and execute a rising block with a left knife-hand. Perform 24 and 25 in a continuous motion.	건는서손칼추켜막기	geonneun seo sonkal chukyeo makgi
26	Pull the left foot to form a right L-stance and execute a low guarding block with the knife-hand.	ㄴ자서손칼낮은데막기	nieunja seo sonkal najeunde makgi
27	Slip the left foot to form a left walking stance and execute a downward punch with the right fist.	건는서앞주먹내려지르기	geonneun seo ap jumeok naeryeo jireugi
28	Step with the left foot to the side rear of the right foot, slide to C to form a right L-stance toward D, and execute a middle guarding block with a knife-hand.	ㄴ자서손칼대비막기	nieunja seo sonkal daebi makgi
29	Jump to land on the same spot to form another right L-stance and execute a middle guarding block with a knife-hand.	뛰기ㄴ자서손칼대비막기	ttwigi nieunja seo sonkal daebi makgi
30	Jump to D to form a right X-stance and execute a high side strike to D with a right back fist.	겨차서등주먹높은데옆때리기	gyeocha seo deung jumeok nopeunde yeop ttaerigi
31	Step with the left foot to C to form a left walking stance and execute a high side block with the left outer forearm.	건는서바깥팔목높운데옆막기	geonneun seo bakkat palmok nopeunde yeop makgi
32	Step with the left foot on line CD to form a right walking stance toward D and execute a high side block with the right outer forearm.	건는서바깥팔목높은데옆막기	geonneun seo bakkat palmok nopeunde yeop makgi
33	Step with the left foot to D to form a right L-stance, and simultaneously execute an upset punch with the right fist and bring the left side fist in front of the right shoulder.	ㄴ자서앞주먹뒤집어지르기	nieunja seo ap jumeok dwijibeo jireugi
34	Execute a right middle hooking kick to A .	가운데반달차기	gaunde bandal chagi
35	Lower the right foot to A to form a left L-stance and execute a high cross cut with a right flat fingertip.	ㄴ자서엎운손끝높운데밖으로긋기	nieunja seo eopun sonkkeut nopeunde bakkeuro geutgi
36	Move the right foot to the left foot and execute a left middle hooking kick to B.	가운데반달차기	gaunde bandal chagi
37	Lower the left foot to B to form a right L-stance and execute a high cross cut with a left flat fingertip.	ㄴ자서엎운손끝높운데밖으로긋기	nieunja seo eopun sonkkeut nopeunde bakkeuro geutgi
38	Move the left foot to the right foot, move the right foot to A to form a left L-stance, and execute a high guarding block with a knife-hand.	ㄴ자서손칼높은데대비막기	nieunja seo sonkal nopeunde daebi makgi
39	Move the right foot to the left foot, move the left foot to B to form a right L-stance, and execute a high guarding block with a knife-hand.	ㄴ자서손칼높은데대비막기	nieunja seo sonkal nopeunde daebi makgi
	Move the left foot back to closed ready stance C facing D.	모아준비서기	moa junbi seogi

== Trivia ==
- Ko-Dang is one of the patterns that refers to the era of colonization of Korea by Japan, next to Do-San, Joong-Gun, Eui-Am, and Sam-Il.
