= Sam-Il (teul) =

Sixteenth ITF Taekwon-Do pattern

16. Sam-Il
삼일
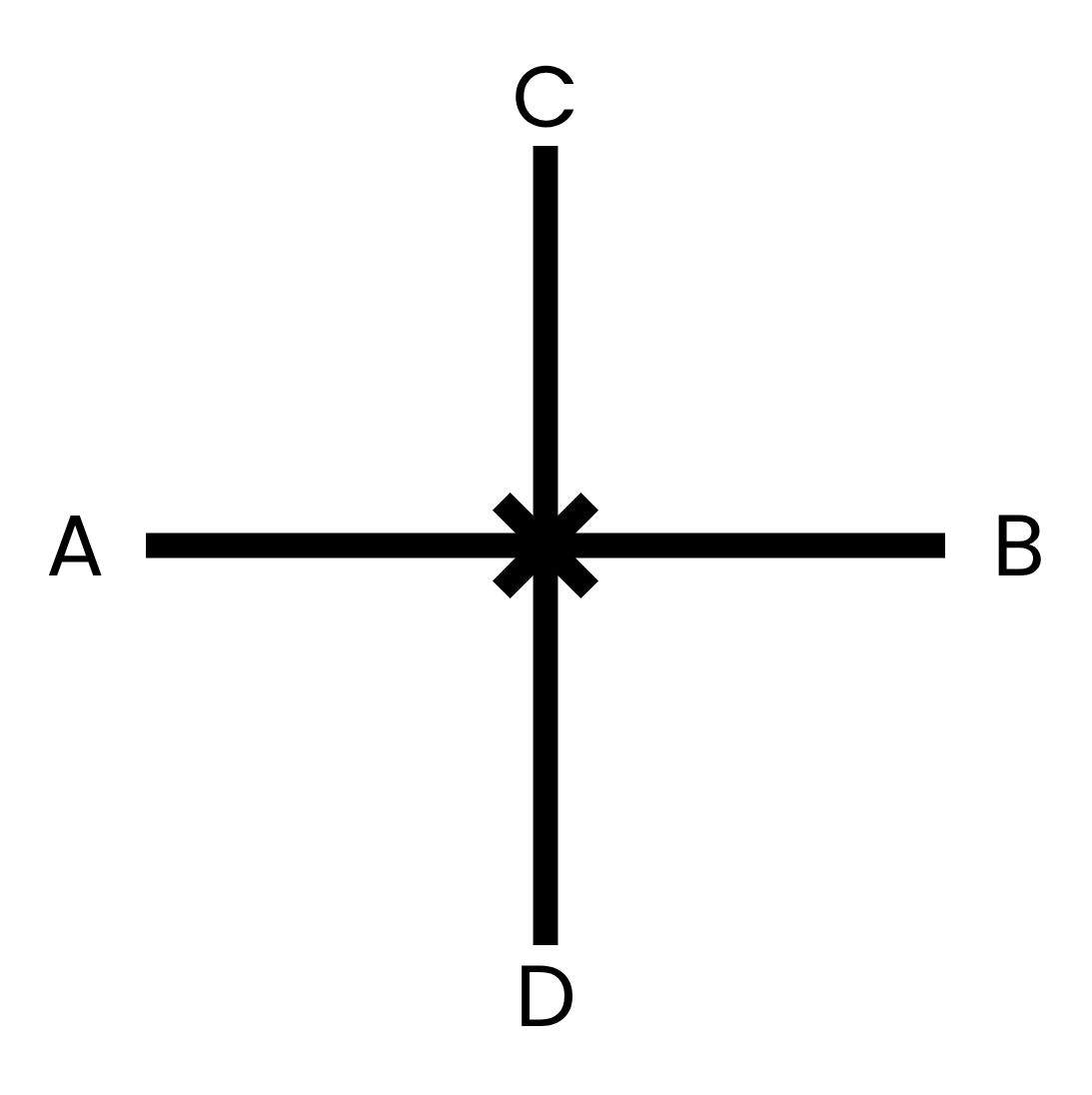
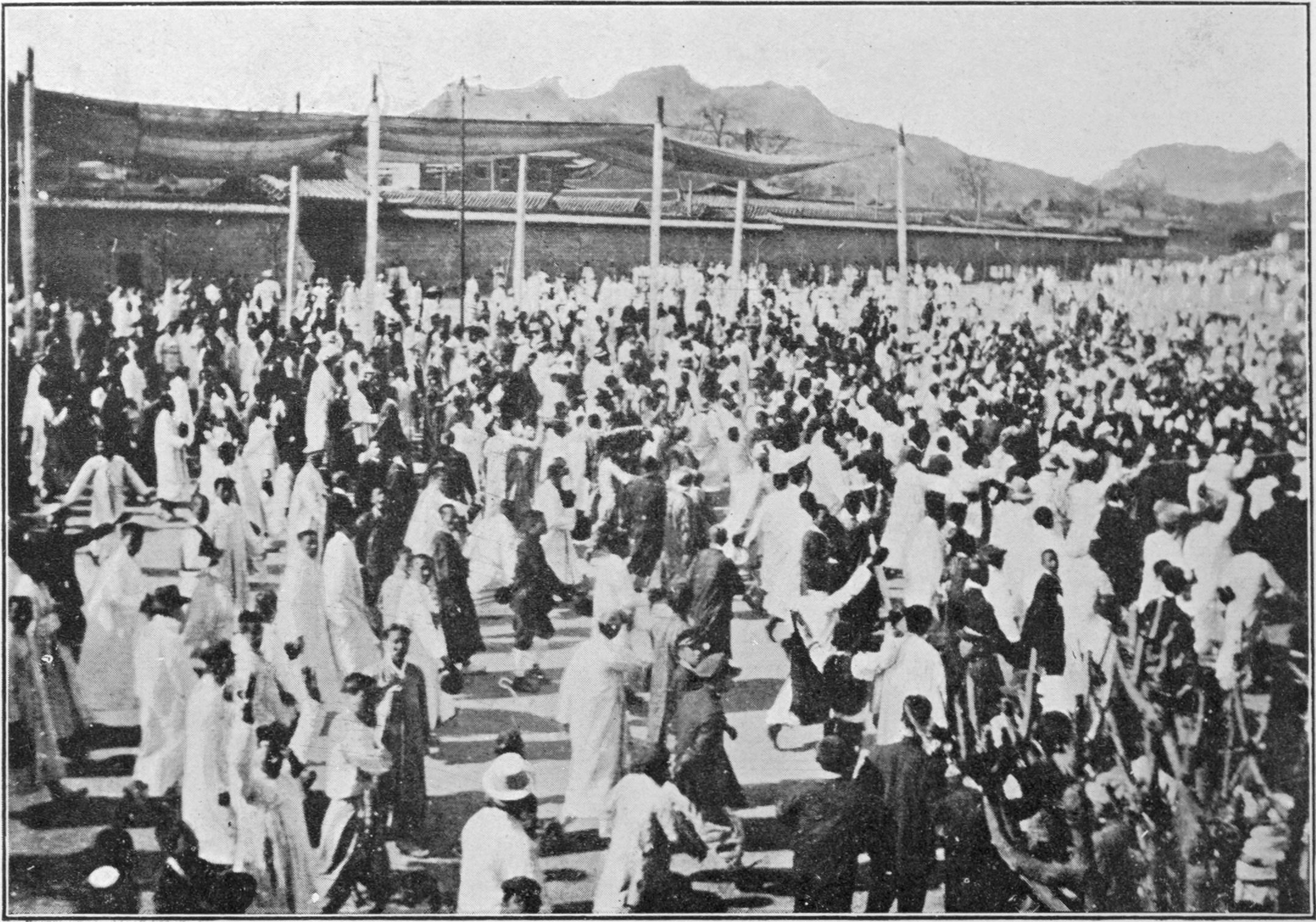
- Diagram of Sam-Il A march in Seoul on March 1, 1919
- Movements: 33
- Begin stance: Closed ready stance C
- Return foot: Left
- Meaning: March First Movement
- Associated dan: 3rd

Sam-Il (Korean: 삼일; RR: Samil; lit. 'March 1', Korean pronunciation: [sa.mil]) is the sixteenth Taekwon-Do teul, as defined by the International Taekwon-Do Federation. The pattern consists of 33 movements and is taught to students with the 3rd dan (black belt) and necessary to know to obtain the 4th dan.

== Meaning ==
Samil in Korean literally means 'three one', but refers to the first day of March of 1919. During this day, a series of peaceful protests was held throughout Korea and internationally to oppose the Japanese occupation of the country. Up to two million Koreans participated, with thousands arrested, assaulted, and killed by the Japanese Chōsen Army.

While failing to overthrow the Japanese regime, the movement stimulated the Korean independence movement, caused the colonial government to grant some cultural freedoms, and resulted in the creation of the Korean Provisional Government. It also inspired other peaceful freedom movements across Asia, including the Chinese May Fourth Movement and the Indian Satyāgraha protests.

=== Number of movements ===
Sam-Il has 33 movements to commemorate the 33 activists who organized the protests.

== Movements ==
Nr.	English description	Korean description (in Hangul)	Korean description (in Revised Romanisation)
	Closed ready stance C facing D	모아준비서기	moa junbi seogi
1	Slide to D forming a right L-stance toward D while executing a middle guarding block to D with the forearm.	미끌며ㄴ자서목낮대비막기	mikkeulmyeo nieunja seo daebi makgi
2	Move the right foot to D forming a right walking stance toward D while executing a high block to D with the right double forearm.	걷는서두팔목높은데막기	geonneun seo du palmok nopeunde makgi
3	Move the left foot to D forming a left walking stance toward D while executing a high side block to D with the right knife-hand and bringing the left palm on the right back forearm.	걷는서손칼높은데반대옆막기	geonneun seo sonkal nopeunde bandae yeop makgi
4	Execute a middle twisting kick to A with the right foot keeping the position of the hands as they were in 3.	가운데비틀어차기	gaunde biteureo chagi
5	Lower the right foot to D forming a right walking stance toward D while executing a middle punch to D with the right fist.	걷는서앞지르기	geonneun seo ap jireugi
6	Move the right foot on line CD to form a sitting stance toward B while executing a middle wedging block with a reverse knife-hand.	앉는서손칼등가운데헤쳐막기	anneun seo sonkal deung gaunde hechyeo makgi
7	Execute a low thrust to C with a right upset finger tip while forming a left walking stance toward C, pivoting with the right foot.	걷는서뒤집은손끝낮은데뚫기	geonneun seo dwijibeun sonkkeut najeunde ttulki
8	Execute a high outward block to D with the right outer forearm and a low block to C with the left forearm while forming a right L-stance toward C pulling the left foot.	ㄴ자서바깥팔목높은데바로밖으로막기	nieunja seo bakkat palmok nopeunde baro bakkeuro makgi
9	Move the right foot to C to form a sitting stance toward A while executing a middle wedging block with a reverse knife-hand.	앉는서손칼등가운데헤쳐막기	anneun seo sonkal deung gaunde hechyeo makgi
10	Execute a low punch to C with the right double fist while forming a left L-stance toward C, pulling the right foot.	ㄴ자서두주먹낮은데지르기	nieunja seo du jumeok najeunde jireugi
11	Move the left foot to C forming a left walking stance toward C while executing a high block to BC with a double arc-hand and looking through it.	걷는서두반달손높은데막기	geonneun seo du bandalson nopeunde makgi
12	Move the right foot to C forming a right walking stance toward C while executing a middle punch to C with the left fist.	걷는서반대앞지르기	geonneun seo bandae ap jireugi
13	Move the right foot on line CD to form a right L-stance toward D while executing a low punch to D with the left double fist.	ㄴ자서두주먹낮은데지르기	nieunja seo du jumeok najeunde jireugi
14	Move the left foot to B forming a right L-stance toward B while executing a high guarding block to B with a reverse knife-hand.	ㄴ자서손칼등높은데대비막기	nieunja seo sonkal deung nopeunde daebi makgi
15	Execute a U-shape block to B while forming a left fixed stance toward B, slipping the left foot.	고정서ㄷ자막기	gojeong seo diguetja makgi
16	Execute a sweeping kick to B with the right side sole and then lower it to B forming a right fixed stance toward B while executing a U-shaped block to B.	쓸어차기, 고정서ㄷ자막기	sseureo chagi, gojeong seo digeutja makgi
17	Jump and spin counter clockwise, landing on the same spot to form a left L-stance toward B while executing a middle guarding block to B with a knife-hand.	뛰며돌며ㄴ자서손칼대비막기	ttwimyeo dolmyeo nieunja seo sonkal daebi makgi
18	Execute a middle side piercing kick to B with the right foot while forming a knife-hand guarding block.	가운데옆차지르기	gaunde yeop cha jireugi
19	Lower the right foot to the left foot and then move the left foot to A forming a left walking stance toward A while striking the left palm with the right front elbow.	걷는서앞팔굽때리기	geonneun seo ap palgup ttaerigi
20	Move the right foot to A turning counter clockwise to form a left diagonal stance toward D at the same time thrusting to C with the left back elbow supporting the left forefist with the right palm and turning the face to C.	사선서뒷팔굽뚫기	saseon seo dwit palgup ttulki
21	Execute a pressing block with an X-fist while forming a right walking stance toward AD.	걷는서교차주먹눌러막기	geonneun seo gyocha jumeonk nulleo makgi
22	Move the left foot to A in a stamping motion to form a sitting stance toward C while executing a W-shape block with the outer forearm.	앉는서바깥팔목산막기	anneun seo bakkat palmok san makgi
23	Execute a middle side piercing kick to A with the left foot while forming a forearm guarding block.	가운데옆차지르기	gaunde yeop cha jireugi
24	Lower the left foot on line A and then execute a low guarding block to B with a knife-hand while forming a left L-stance toward B, pivoting the left foot.	ㄴ자서손칼낮은데대비막기	nieunja seo sonkal najeunde daebi makgi
25	Move the left foot to B forming a right rear stance toward B while executing an upward block with a left palm.	뒷발서손바닥올려막기	dwitbal seo sonbadak ollyeo makgi
26	Move the right foot to B forming a left rear foot stance toward B while executing a pressing block with a twin palm.	뒷발서쌍손바닥눌러막기	dwitbal seo ssang sonbadak nulleo makgi
27	Move the left foot to C in a stamping motion to form a left walking stance toward C while executing an upset punch to C with a twin fist.	구르며걷는서쌍주먹뒤집어지르기	gureumyeo geonneun seo ssang jumeok dwijibeo jireugi
28	Move the right foot to C forming a left L-stance toward C while executing a low block to C with the right forearm, pulling the left fist under the left armpit.	ㄴ자서팔목낮은데막기	nieunja seo palmok najeunde makgi
29	Execute a middle punch to C with the left fist while maintaining a left L-stance toward C bringing the right fist over the left shoulder.	ㄴ자서바로앞지르기	nieunja seo baro ap jireugi
30	Execute a middle front block with the right forearm while forming a left walking stance toward D, pivoting with the right foot.	걷는서바깥팔목반대앞막기	geonneun seo bakkat palmok bandae ap makgi
31	Execute a high punch to D with the left fist while maintaining a left walking stance toward D. Perform 30 and 31 in a continuous motion.	걷는서높은데앞지르기, 계속동작	geonneun seo nopeunde ap jireugi, gyesok dongjak
32	Execute a low front snap kick to D with the left foot keeping the position of the hands as they were in 31.	낮은데앞차부시기	najeunde ap cha busigi
33	Lower the left foot to D and then move the right foot to D in a stamping motion forming a right walking stance toward D while executing a high vertical punch to D with a twin fist.	구르며걷는서쌍주먹높은데세워지르기	gureumyeo geonneun seo ssang jumeok nopeunde sewo jireugi
	Move the left foot to the closed ready stance C facing D.	모아준비서기	moa junbi seogi

== Trivia ==
- Sam-Il is one of the patterns that refers to the era of colonization of Korea by Japan, next to Do-San, Joong-Gun, Eui-Am, and Ko-Dang.
- Three people who organized or participated in the March First Movement give name to other teul: Ahn Chang Ho (Do-San), Son Byeonghui (Eui-Am), and Jo Mansik (Ko-Dang).
- Sam-Il is one of the few teul that are not named after people, together with Chon-Ji, Juche, and Tong-Il.
