= Tong-Il (teul) =

Twenty-fourth ITF Taekwon-Do pattern

24. Tong-Il
통일
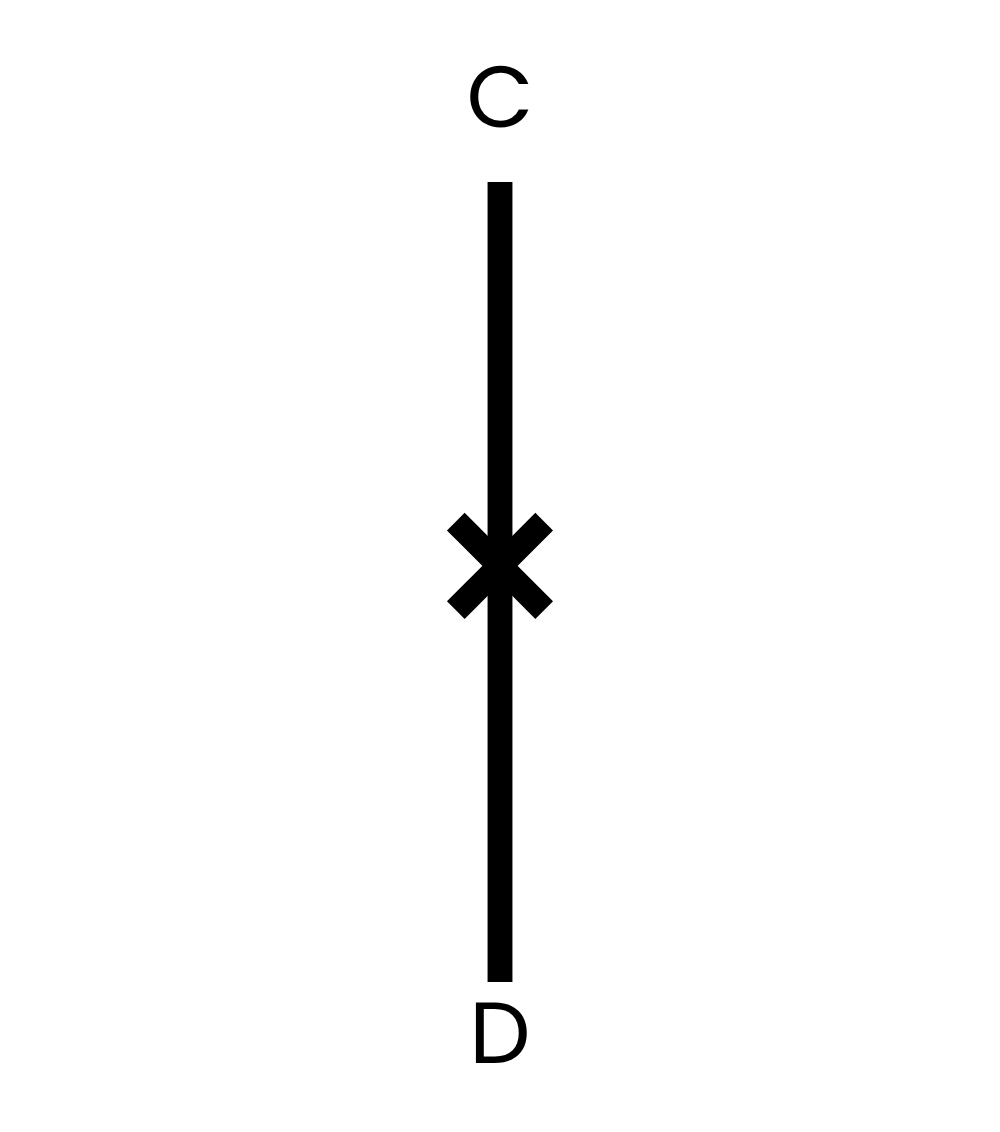
- Diagram of Tong-Il Korean Reunification Flag
- Movements: 56
- Begin stance: Parallel stance with overlapped back hand
- Return foot: Right
- Meaning: Korean reunification
- Associated dan: 6th

Tong-Il (Korean: 통일; RR: Tongil, Korean pronunciation: [tʰoŋ.il]) is the twenty-fourth Taekwon-Do teul, as defined by the International Taekwon-Do Federation. The pattern consists of 56 movements and is taught to students with the 6th dan (black belt) and necessary to know to obtain the 7th dan.

== Meaning ==
The name of the pattern refers to Korean unification, the hypothetical unification of North Korea and South Korea into a singular Korean sovereign state. While Korea was unified for over a millennium, it was split after the end of Japanese occupation of Korea and World War II along the 38th parallel (now the Korean Demilitarized Zone). North Korea was occupied by the Soviet Union, and later administered by the Workers' Party of Korea under Kim Il Sung. South Korea was occupied by the United States, later becoming independent under dictator Syngman Rhee. Both governments of the two new Korean states claimed to be the sole legitimate government of all of Korea. The Korean War, which began in June 1950, ended in a stalemate in July 1953.

Korean reunification was a political dream of general Choi Hong-hi, the founder of Taekwon-Do.

It is unclear why Tong-Il has 56 movements.

== Movements ==
Nr.	English description	Korean description (in Hangul)	Korean description (in Revised Romanisation)
	Parallel stance with overlapped back hand facing D	나란히포갠손등서기	narani pogaen sondeung seogi
1	Move the right foot to C to form a left walking stance toward D while executing a middle punch to D with a twin fist. Perform in slow motion.	걷는서쌍주먹지르기, 느린동작	geonneun seo ssang jumeok jireugi, neurin dongjak
2	Move the left foot to C to form a right walking stance toward D while executing a horizontal strike with a twin knife-hand. Perform in slow motion.	걷는서쌍손칼수평때리기, 느린동작	geonneun seo ssang sonkal supyeong ttaerigi, neurin dongjak
3	Move the left foot to D, forming a right rear foot stance toward D while executing a middle inward block to D with the left outer forearm.	뒷발서바깥팔목가운데안으로막기	dwitbal seo bakkat palmok gaunde aneuro makgi
4	Execute a low inward block to D with the right palm while forming a left walking stance toward D, slipping the right foot, and bringing the left side fist in front of the right shoulder.	걷는서손바닥낮은데안으로막기	geonneun seo sonbadak najeunde aneuro makgi
5	Move the right foot to D, forming a left L-stance toward D while executing a middle punch to D with the right fist.	ㄴ자서반대지르기	nieunja seo bandae jireugi
6	Execute a middle punch to D with the left fist while maintaining a left L-stance toward D. Perform 5 and 6 in a fast motion.	ㄴ자서바로앞지르기, 빠른동작	nieunja seo baro ap jireugi, ppareun dongjak
7	Move the left foot to Din a stamping motion to form a right L-stance toward D while executing a high outward strike to D with the left back hand.	구르며ㄴ자서손등높은데밖으로때리기	gureumyeo nieunja seo sondeung nopeunde bakkeuro ttaerigi
8	Execute an inward vertical kick to the left palm with the right reverse footsword.	발칼등안으로세워차기	balkal deung aneuro sewo chagi
9	Lower the right foot to D in a stamping motion, forming a left L-stance toward D while executing a high outward strike to D with the right back hand.	구르며ㄴ자서손등높은데밖으로때리기	gureumyeo nieunja seo sondeung nopeunde bakkeuro ttaerigi
10	Execute an inward vertical kick to the right palm with the left reverse footsword.	발칼등안으로세워차기	balkal deung aneuro sewo chagi
11	Lower the left foot to D, and then execute a horizontal block with a twin palm while forming a right L-stance toward D, slipping the left foot. Perform in a slow motion.	ㄴ자서쌍손바닥수평막기, 느린동작	nieunja seo ssang sonbadak supyeong makgi, neurin dongjak
12	Move the right foot to D, forming a right walking stance toward D while executing a high side block to D with the right reverse knife-hand. Perform in a slow motion.	걷는서손칼등높은데옆막기, 느린동작	geonneun seo sonkal deung nopeunde yeop makgi, neurin dongjak
13	Execute a middle side block to D with the left reverse knife-hand while maintaining a right walking stance toward D. Perform in a slow motion.	걷는서손칼등가운데반대옆막기, 느린동작	geonneun seo sonkal deung gaunde bandae yeop makgi, neurin dongjak
14	Execute a middle punch to D with the right fist while maintaining a right walking stance toward D.	걷는서앞지르기	geonneun seo ap jireugi
15	Execute a middle punch to D with the left fist while maintaining a right walking stance toward D.Perform 14 and 15 in a fast motion.	걷는서반대앞지르기	geonneun seo bandae ap jireugi
16	Execute a downward kick to AC with the right foot, keeping the position of the hands as they were in 15.	내려차기	naeryeo chagi
17	Lower the right foot to C in a stamping motion, forming a left L-stance toward C while executing a downward strike to C with the right back fist.	구르며ㄴ자서등주먹내려때리기	gureumyeo nieunja seo deung jumeok naeryeo ttaerigi
18	Execute an outward vertical kick to BC with the left foot, keeping the position of the hands as they were in 17.	밖으로세워차기	bakkeuro sewo chagi
19	Lower the left foot to C in a stamping motion to form a right L-stance toward C while executing a downward strike to C with the left back fist.	구르며ㄴ자서등주먹내려때리기	gureumyeo nieunja seo deung jumeok naeryeo ttaerigi
20	Execute a high punch to D with the left fist while forming a right walking stance toward D, pivoting with the left foot.	걷는서높은데반대앞지르기	geonneun seo nopeunde bandae ap jireugi
21	Execute a high punch to D with the right fist while maintaining a right walking stance toward D. Perform 20 and 21 in a fast motion.	걷는서높은데앞지르기, 빠른동작	geonneun seo nopeunde ap jireugi, ppareun dongjak
22	Move the left foot to D, forming a right rear foot stance toward D while executing an upward block with the left bow wrist.	뒷발서손목등올려막기	dwitbal seo sonmok deung ollyeo makgi
23	Move the right foot to D to form a left rear foot stance toward D while executing an upward block with the right bow wrist.	뒷발서손목등올려막기	dwitbal seo sonmok deung ollyeo makgi
24	Move the left foot to C, forming a left walking stance toward C while executing a pressing block with the left palm.	걷는서손바닥바로눌러막기	geonneun seo sonbadak baro nulleo makgi
25	Move the right foot to C to form a right walking stance toward C while executing a pressing block with the right palm. Perform 24 and 25 in a normal motion.	걷는서손바닥바로눌러막기	geonneun seo sonbadak baro nulleo makgi
26	Bring the left foot to the right foot to form a closed stance toward C while bringing both back hands in front of the lower abdomen in a circular motion, hitting the left palm with the right knife-hand.	모아서손칼낮은데앞막기	moa seo sonkal najeunde ap makgi
27	Move the left foot to D, forming a left walking stance toward D while executing a rising block with the left knife-hand.	걷는서손칼추켜막기	geonneun seo sonkal chukyeo makgi
28	Execute a high punch to D with the right fist while maintaining a left walking stance toward D.	걷는서높은데반대앞지르기	geonneun seo nopeunde bandae ap jireugi
29	Slide to D to form a left L-stance toward D while executing an upset punch to D with the left fist, bringing the right side fist in front of the left shoulder.	미끌며ㄴ자서바로뒤집어지르기	mikkeulmyeo nieunja seo baro dwijibeo jireugi
30	Move the right foot to C, forming a left walking stance toward D while executing a high thrust with the right angle fingertip.	걷는서호미손끝높은데반대뚫기	geonneun seo homi sonkkeunrt nopeunde bandae ttulki
31	Move the left foot on line CD to form a right walking stance toward C while executing a rising block with the right knife-hand.	걷는서손칼추켜막기	geonneun seo sonkal chukyeo makgi
32	Execute a high punch to C with the left fist while maintaining a right walking stance toward C.	걷는서높은데반대앞지르기	geonneun seo nopeunde bandae ap jireugi
33	Slide to C to form a right L-stance toward C while executing an upset punch to C with the right fist, bringing the left side fist in front of the right shoulder.	미끌며ㄴ자서바로뒤집어지르기	mikkeulmyeo nieunja seo baro dwijibeo jireugi
34	Move the left foot to D, forming a right walking stance toward C while executing a high thrust with the left angle fingertip.	걷는서호미손끝높은데반대뚫기	geonneun seo homi sonkkeunrt nopeunde bandae ttulki
35	Execute a low guarding block to C with a reverse knife-hand in a circular motion while forming a left L-stance toward C, pivoting with the left foot.	ㄴ자서손칼등낮은데대비막기	nieunja seo sonkal deung najeunde daebi makgi
36	Execute a low guarding block to D with a reverse knife-hand in a circular motion while forming a right L-stance toward D, pivoting with the right foot.	ㄴ자서손칼등낮은데대비막기	nieunja seo sonkal deung najeunde daebi makgi
37	Execute a low block to D with the right forearm and a middle outward block to D with the left knife-hand while forming a left walking stance toward D, slipping the left foot.	걷는서손칼가운데밖으로막기팔목낮은데반대막기	geonneun seo sonkal gaunde bakkeuro makgi palmok najeunde bandae makgi
38	Move the right foot to D in a stamping motion to form a right walking stance toward D at the same time executing a high vertical punch to D with a twin fist.	구르며걷는서쌍주먹높은데세워지르기	gureumyeo geonneun seo ssang jumeok nopeunde sewo jireugi
39	Pull the right reverse footsword to the left knee joint, forming a left one-leg stance toward D while striking the left palm with the right back forearm.	외발서등팔목반대때리기	oebal seo deung palmok bandae ttaerigi
40	Execute a middle back piercing kick to C with the right foot, pulling both hands in the opposite direction.	가운데뒷차지르기	gaunde dwit cha jireugi
41	Lower the right foot to C to form a sitting stance toward A while executing a W-shape block with the outer forearm.	앉는서바깥팔목산막기	anneun seo bakkat palmok san makgi
42	Slide to C maintaining a sitting stance toward A while executing a W-shape block with the outer forearm.	앉는서바깥팔목미끌며산막기	anneun seo bakkat palmok mikkeulmyeo san makgi
43	Move the right foot to D in a stamping motion, turning counter clockwise to form a sitting stance toward B while executing a W-shape block with the outer forearm.	앉는서바깥팔목산막기	anneun seo bakkat palmok san makgi
44	Slide to C, maintaining a sitting stance toward B while executing a W-shape block with the outer forearm.	앉는서바깥팔목미끌며산막기	anneun seo bakkat palmok mikkeulmyeo san makgi
45	Pull the left reverse footsword to the right knee joint, forming a right one-leg stance toward C while striking the right palm with the left back forearm.	외발서등팔목반대때리기	oebal seo deung palmok bandae ttaerigi
46	Execute a high back piercing kick to D with the left foot, pulling both hands in the opposite direction.	높은데뒷차지르기	nopeunde dwit cha jireugi
47	Lower the left foot to C in a jumping motion, forming a left X-stance toward C while executing a pressing block with an X-fist.	뛰며겨차서교차주먹눌러막기	ttwimyeo gyeocha seo gyocha jumeok nulleo makgi
48	Move the right foot to D, forming a left walking stance toward C while executing a front strike with the left under fist.	걷는서밑주먹앞때리기	geonneun seo mit jumeok ap ttaerigi
49	Move the right foot to C to form a right walking stance toward C while executing a front strike with the right under fist.	걷는서밑주먹앞때리기	geonneun seo mit jumeok ap ttaerigi
50	Execute a middle pushing block to C with the left palm while maintaining a right walking stance toward C.	걷는서손바닥밀어막기	geonneun seo sonbadak mireo makgi
51	Execute a circular block to A with the right knife-hand while forming a left walking stance toward AD.	걷는서손칼돌리며막기	geonneun seo sonkal dollimyeo makgi
52	Move the left foot to C to form a left walking stance toward C while executing a middle pushing block to C with the right palm.	걷는서손바닥밀어막기	geonneun seo sonbadak mireo makgi
53	Execute a circular block to B with the left knife-hand while forming a right walking stance toward BD.	걷는서손칼돌리며막기	geonneun seo sonkal dollimyeo makgi
54	Execute a high side piercing kick to D with the right foot, forming a forearm guarding block, and then lower it to the left foot to form a closed stance toward D while executing a twin side back elbow thrust.	높운데옆차지르기, 모아서쌍옆뒷팔굽뚫기	nopunde yeop cha jireugi, moa seo ssang yeop dwit palgup ttulki
55	Move the left foot to D, forming a sitting stance toward A while executing a middle side punch to D with the left fist.	앉는서옆지르기	anneun seo yeop jireugi
56	Execute a middle punch to D with the right fist while forming a left walking stance toward D, pivoting with the left foot.	걷는서반대앞지르기	geonneun seo bandae ap jireugi
	Move the right foot back to parallel stance with overlapped back hand facing D.	나란히포갠손등서기	narani pogaen sondeung seogi

== Trivia ==
- Tong-Il is the only pattern that refers to an event that has not happened yet.
- Tong-Il is one of the few teul that are not named after people, together with Chon-Ji, Juche, and Sam-Il.
- The diagram of Tong-Il (I) symbolizes the unity of Korean people.
- There are several movements that symbolize general Choi's view of the Korean question. For instance, the 38th movement is performed in stamping motion, symbolizing his frustration over the division of Korea (along the 38th parallel).
