= Joong-Gun (teul) =

Sixth ITF Taekwon-Do pattern

6. Joong-Gun
중근
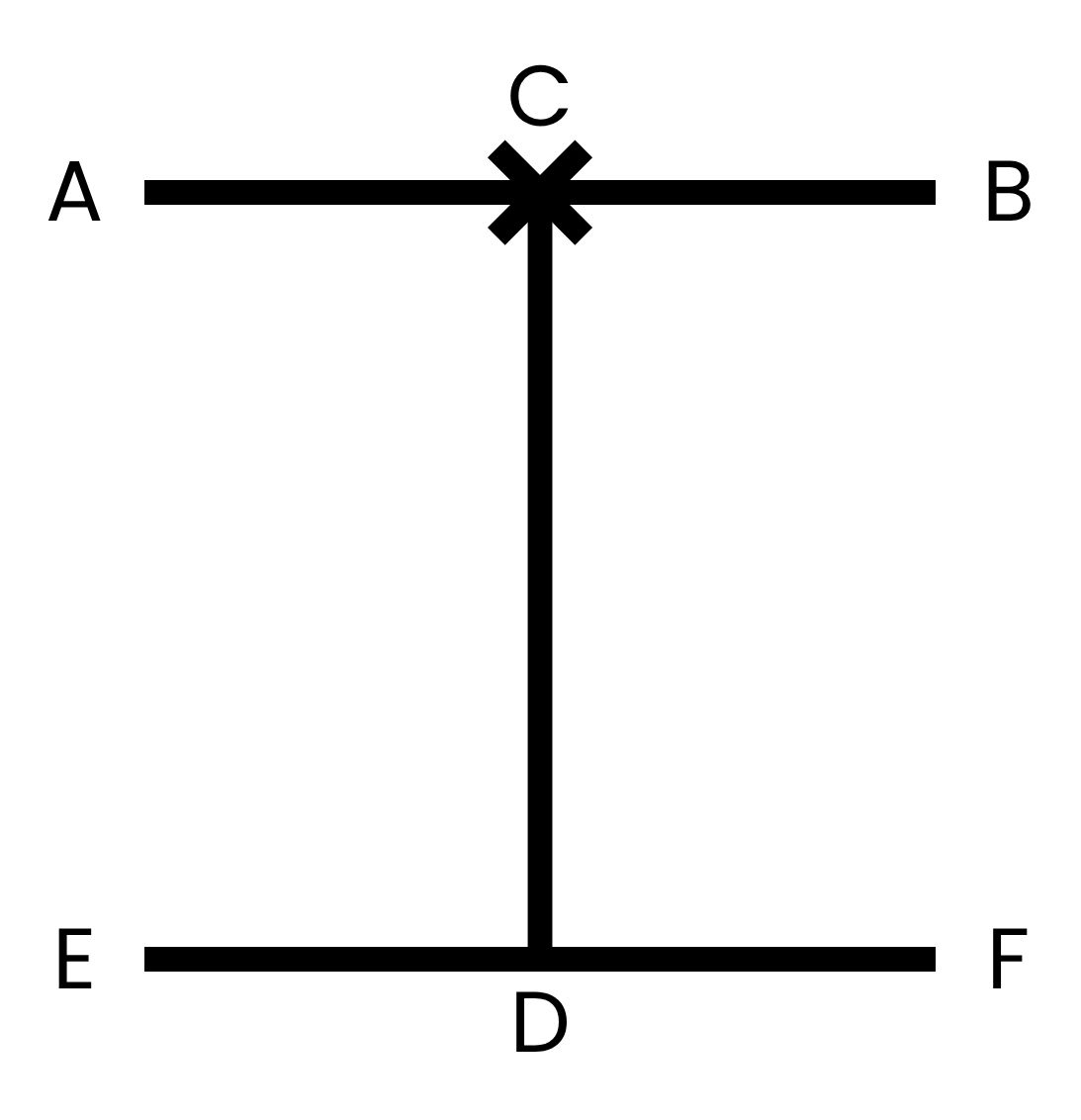
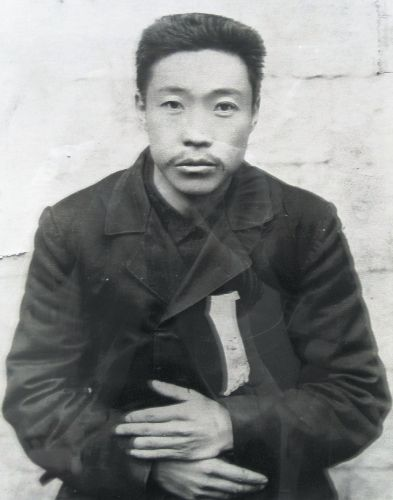
- Diagram of Joong-Gun An Jung-geun
- Movements: 32
- Begin stance: Closed ready stance B
- Return foot: Left
- Meaning: An Jung-geun
- Associated geup: 4th

Joong-Gun (Korean: 중근; RR: Junggeun, Korean pronunciation: [tɕuŋ.kɯn]) is the sixth Taekwon-Do teul, as defined by the International Taekwon-Do Federation. The pattern consists of 32 movements and is taught to students with the 4th geup (blue belt) and necessary to know to obtain the 3rd geup (blue-red belt).

== Meaning ==
The pattern's name is based on An Jung-geun, a Korean independence and anti-Western imperialism activist. He is most remembered for assassinating Itō Hirobumi, former Prime Minister of Japan and Japanese Resident-General of Korea, in Harbin, China in 1909. He was imprisoned and executed by Japanese imperial forces in 1910. An is honored as a martyr by the governments of North Korea and South Korea, while the Japanese government regards him as a terrorist.

=== Number of movements ===
It has been believed that the 32 movements of Joong-Gun refer to the age at which An Jung-geun was executed, but he only lived until age 30. It is unclear why the pattern has 32 movements.

== Movements ==
Nr.	English description	Korean description (in Hangul)	Korean description (in Revised Romanisation)
	Closed ready stance B facing D	모아준비서기	moa junbi seogi
1	Move the left foot to B, forming a right L-stance toward B while executing a middle block to B with the left reverse knife-hand.	ㄴ자서손칼등가운데옆막기	nieunja seo sonkal deung gaunde yeop makgi
2	Execute a low side front snap kick to B with the left foot, keeping the position of the hands as they were in 1.	낮은데옆앞차부시기	najeunde yeop ap cha busigi
3	Lower the left foot to B and then move the right foot to B, forming a left rear foot stance toward B while executing an upward block with the right palm.	뒷발서손바닥올려막기	dwitbal seo sonbadak ollyeo makgi
4	Move the right foot to A, forming a left L-stance toward A, at the same time executing a middle block to A with the right reverse knife-hand.	ㄴ자서손칼등가운데옆막기	nieunja seo sonkal deung gaunde yeop makgi
5	Execute a low side front kick to A with the right foot, keeping the position of the hands as they were in 4.	낮은데옆앞차부시기	najeunde yeop ap cha busigi
6	Lower the fight foot to A and then move the left foot to A, forming a right rear foot stance toward A while executing an upward block with the left palm.	뒷발서손바닥올려막기	dwitbal seo sonbadak ollyeo makgi
7	Move the left foot to D, forming a right L-stance toward D while executing a middle guarding block to D with a knife-hand.	ㄴ자서손칼대비막기	nieunja seo sonkal daebi makgi
8	Execute a right upper elbow strike while forming a left walking stance toward D, slipping the left foot to D.	걷는서윗팔굽때리기	geonneun seo wit palgup ttaerigi
9	Move the right foot to D, forming a left L-stance toward D, at the same time executing a middle guarding block to D with a knifehand.	ㄴ자서손칼대비막기	nieunja seo sonkal daebi makgi
10	Execute a left upper elbow strike, at the same time forming a right walking stance toward D, slipping the right foot to D.	걷는서윗팔굽때리기	geonneun seo wit palgup ttaerigi
11	Move the left foot to D, forming a left walking stance toward D while executing a high vertical punch to D with a twin fist.	걷는서쌍주먹높은데세워지르기	geonneun seo ssang jumeok nopeunde sewo jireugi
12	Move the right foot to D, forming a right walking stance toward D while executing an upset punch to D with a twin fist.	걷는서쌍주먹뒤집어지르기	geonneun seo ssang jumeok dwi jibeo jireugi
13	Move the right foot on line CD, and then turn counter-clockwise to form a left walking stance toward C while executing a rising block with an X-fist.	걷는서교차주먹추켜막기	geonneun seo gyocha jumeok chukyeo makgi
14	Move the left foot to E, forming a right L-stance toward E while executing a high side strike to E with the left back fist.	ㄴ자서등주먹높은데옆때리기	nieunja seo deung jumeok nopeunde yeop ttaerigi
15	Twist the left fist counter-clockwise until the back fist faces downward, at the same time forming a left walking stance toward E, slipping the left foot to E.	비틀어빼기	biteureo ppaegi
16	Execute a high punch to E with the right fist while maintaining a left walking stance toward E. Perform 15 and 16 in a fast motion.	걷는서높은데반대앞지르기, 빠른동작	geonneun seo nopeunde bandae ap jireugi, ppareun dongjak
17	Bring the left foot to the right foot and then move the right foot to F, forming a left L-stance toward F while executing a high side strike to F with a right back fist.	ㄴ자서등주먹높은데옆때리기	nieunja seo deung jumeok nopeunde yeop ttaerigi
18	Twist the right fist clockwise until the back fist faces downward while forming right walking stance toward E, slipping right foot to F.	비틀어빼기	biteureo ppaegi
19	Execute a high punch to F with the left fist while maintaining a right walking stance toward F. Perform 18 and 19 in a fast motion.	걷는서높은데반대앞지르기, 빠른동작	geonneun seo nopeunde bandae ap jireugi, ppareun dongjak
20	Bring the right foot to the left foot and then move the left foot to C, forming a left walking stance toward C while executing a high block to C with a left double forearm.	걷는서두팔목높은데막기	geonneun seo du palmok nopeunde makgi
21	Execute a middle punch to C with the left fist while forming a right L-stance toward C, pulling the left foot.	ㄴ자서반대지르기	nieunja seo bandae jireugi
22	Execute a middle side piercing kick to C with the right foot.	가운데옆차지르기	gaunde yeop cha jireugi
23	Lower the right foot to C, forming a right walking stance toward C while executing a high block to C with the right double forearm.	걷는서두팔목높은데막기	geonneun seo du palmok nopeunde makgi
24	Execute a middle punch to C with the right fist while forming a left L-stance toward C, pulling the right foot.	ㄴ자서반대지르기	nieunja seo bandae jireugi
25	Execute a middle side piercing kick to C with the left foot.	가운데옆차지르기	gaunde yeop cha jireugi
26	Lower the left foot to C, forming a right L-stance toward C while executing a middle guarding block to C with the forearm.	ㄴ자서대비막기	nieunja seo daebi makgi
27	Execute a pressing block with the right palm while forming a left low stance toward D, slipping the left foot to C. Perform 27 in a slow motion.	낮춰서손바닥눌러막기, 느린동작	natchwo seo sonbadak nulleo makgi, neurin dongjak
28	Move the right foot to C, forming a left L-stance toward C while executing a middle guarding block to C with the forearm.	ㄴ자서대비막기	nieunja seo daebi makgi
29	Execute a pressing block with the left palm while forming a right low stance toward C, slipping the right foot to C. Perform 29 in a slow motion.	낮춰서손바닥눌러막기, 느린 동작	natchwo seo sonbadak nulleo makgi, neurin dongjak
30	Bring the left foot to the right foot, forming a close stance toward A while executing an angle punch with the right fist. Perform 30 in a slow motion	모아서앞주먹ㄱ자지르기, 느린동작	moa seo ap jumeok nieunja jireugi, neurin dongjak
31	Move the right foot to A, forming a right fixed stance toward A while executing a U-shape block to A.	고정서ㄷ자막기	gojeong seo digeutja makgi
32	Bring the right foot to the left foot and then move the left foot to B, forming a left fixed stance toward B, at the same time executing a U-shape block to B.	고정서ㄷ자막기	gojeong seo digeutja makgi
	Move the left foot to the closed ready stance B facing D.	모아준비서기	moa junbi seogi

== Trivia ==
- Joong-Gun is one of the patterns that refers to the era of colonisation of Korea by Japan, next to Do-San, Eui-Am, Ko-Dang, and Sam-Il. An Jung-geun worked together with Ahn Chang Ho, after whom Do-San is named.
