= Do-San (teul) =

Third ITF Taekwon-Do pattern

3. Do-San
도산
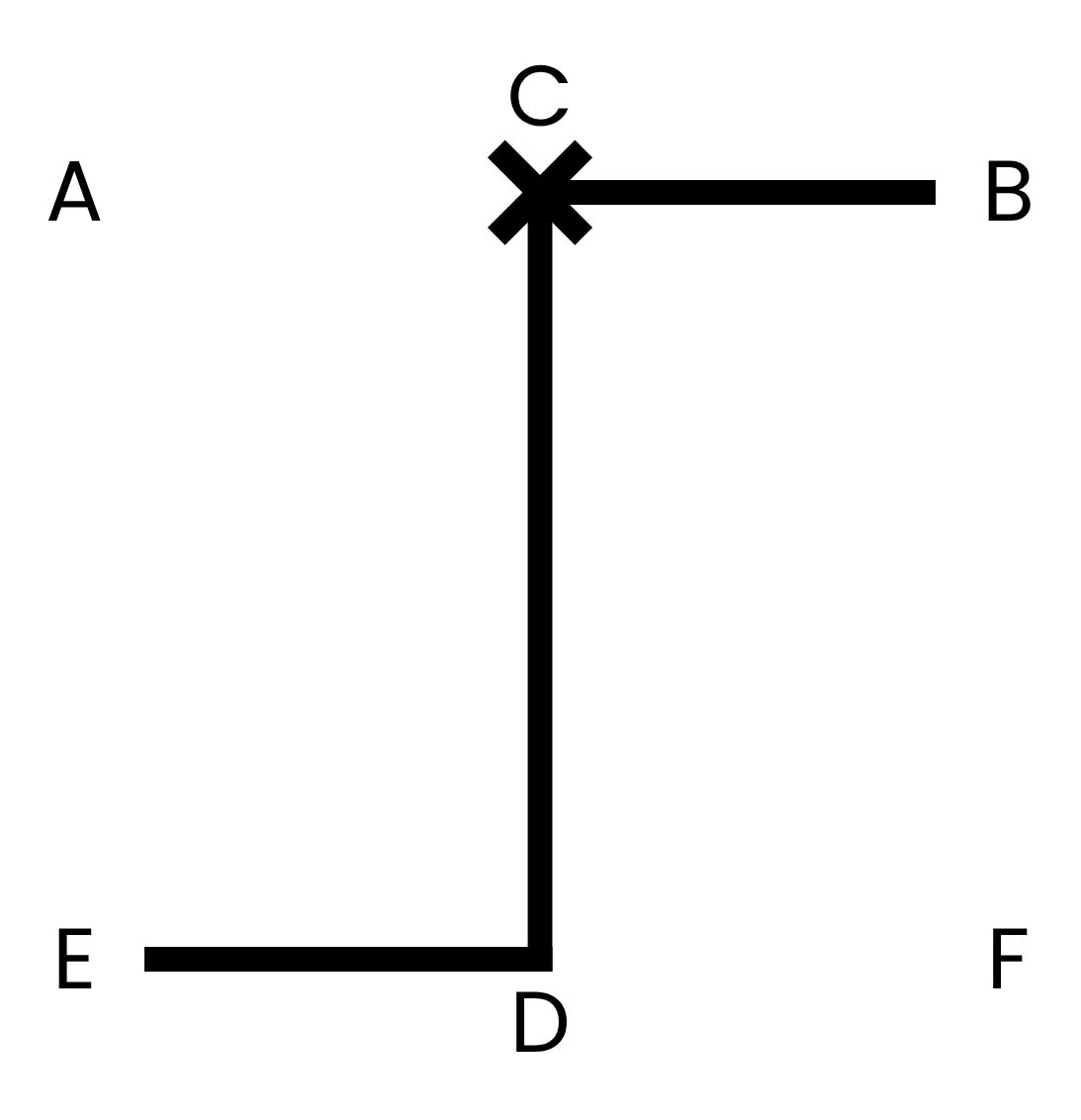
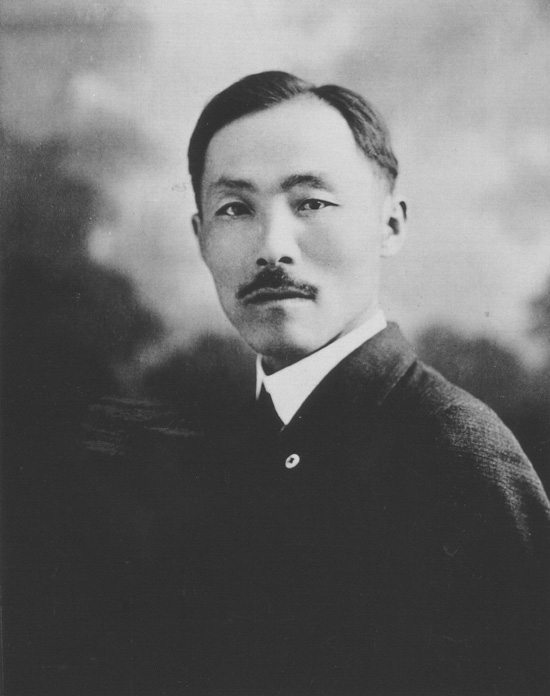
- Diagram of Do-San Ahn Chang Ho
- Movements: 24
- Begin stance: Parallel ready stance A
- Return foot: Right
- Meaning: Ahn Chang Ho
- Associated geup: 7th

Do-San (Korean: 도산; RR: Dosan, Korean pronunciation: [to.san]) is the third Taekwon-Do teul, as defined by the International Taekwon-Do Federation. The pattern consists of 24 movements and is taught to students with the 7th geup (yellow-green belt) and necessary to know to obtain the 6th geup (green belt).

== Meaning ==
The pattern is named after Ahn Chang Ho (pen name Dosan), a Korean politician and independence activist from the early 20th century. Ahn was among the first Korean immigrants in the United States, established the Korean independence organisation Shinminhoe, and was a key founding member of the Provisional Government of the Republic of Korea in Shanghai in 1919. He is also one of two men believed to have written the lyrics of the Aegukga, South Korea's national anthem.

=== Number of movements ===
It has been believed that Do-San has 24 movements to reflect his entire life, which devoted to the Korean nation, a similar explanation that is traditionally associated with the number of teul (also 24). However, the number most likely refers to the age at which Ahn Chang Ho was recognized as a political leader of Koreans in the United States.

== Movements ==
Nr.	English description	Korean description (in Hangul)	Korean description (in Revised Romanisation)
	Parallel ready stance A facing D	나란히준비서기	narani junbi seogi
1	Move the left foot to B, forming a left walking stance toward B, at the same time executing a high side block to B, with the left outer forearm.	걷는서바깥팔목높은데옆막기	geonneun seo bakkat palmok nopeunde yeop makgi
2	Execute a middle punch to B with the right fist while maintaining a left walking stance toward B.	걷는서반대앞지르기	geonneun seo bandae ap jireugi
3	Move the left foot on line AB, and then turn clockwise to form a right walking stance toward A, at the same time executing a high side block to A, with the fight outer forearm.	걷는서바깥팔목높은데옆막기	geonneun seo bakkat palmok nopeunde yeop makgi
4	Execute a middle punch to A with the left fist while maintaining a right walking stance toward A.	걷는서반대앞지르기	geonneun seo bandae ap jireugi
5	Move the left foot to D, forming a right L-stance toward D while executing a middle-guarding block to D with a knife-hand.	ㄴ자서손칼대비막기	nieunja seo sonkal daebi makgi
6	Move the right foot to D, forming a right walking stance toward D while executing a middle thrust to D with the right straight fingertip.	걷는서선손끝뚫기	geonneun seo seonsonkkeut ttulki
7	Twist the right knifehand together with the body counter-clockwise until it's palm faces downwards (into a sitting stance, up on toes) and then move the left foot to D, turning counter-clockwise to form a left walking stance toward D while executing a high side strike to D with the left back fist.	빼기, 걷는서등주먹높은데옆때리기	ppaegi, geonneun seo deung jumeok nopeunde yeop ttaerigi
8	Move the right foot to D, forming a right walking stance toward D while executing a high side strike to D with the right back fist.	걷는서등주먹높은데옆때리기	geonneun seo deung jumeok nopeunde yeop ttaerigi
9	Move the left foot to B, forming a left walking stance toward E, at the same time executing a high side block to E, with the left outer forearm.	걷는서바깥팔목높은데옆막기	geonneun seo bakkat palmok nopeunde yeop makgi
10	Execute a middle punch to E with the right fist while maintaining a left walking stance toward E.	걷는서반대앞지르기	geonneun seo bandae ap jireugi
11	Move the left foot on line EF, and then turn clockwise to form a right walking stance toward F, at the same time executing a high side block to F, with the right outer forearm.	걷는서바깥팔목높은데옆막기	geonneun seo bakkat palmok nopeunde yeop makgi
12	Execute a middle punch to A with the left fist while maintaining a right walking stance toward A.	걷는서반대앞지르기	geonneun seo bandae ap jireugi
13	Move the left foot to CE, forming a left walking stance toward CE while executing a high wedging block to CE with the outer forearm.	걷는서바깥팔목높은데헤쳐막기	geonneun seo bakkat palmok nopeunde hechyeo makgi
14	Execute a middle front snap kick to CE with the right foot, keeping the position of the hands as they were in 13.	가운데앞차부시기	gaunde ap cha busigi
15	Lower the foot to CE, forming a right walking stance towards CE, while executing a middle punch to CE with the right fist.	걷는서앞지르기	geonneun seo ap jireugi
16	Execute a middle punch to CE with the left fist while maintaining a right walking stance towards CE. Perform 15 and 16 in a fast motion.	걷는서반대앞지르기, 빠른동작	geonneun seo bandae ap jireugi, ppareun dongjak
17	Move the right foot to CF, forming a right walking stance toward CF while executing a high wedging block to CF with the outer forearm.	걷는서바깥팔목높은데헤쳐막기	geonneun seo bakkat palmok nopeunde hechyeo makgi
18	Execute a middle front snap kick to CF with the left foot; keeping the position of the hands as they were in 17.	가운데앞차부시기	gaunde ap cha busigi
19	Lower the foot to CF, forming a left walking stance towards CF, while executing a middle punch to CF with the left fist.	걷는서앞지르기	geonneun seo ap jireugi
20	Execute a middle punch to CF with the right fist while maintaining a left walking stance towards CF. Perform 19 and 20 in a fast motion.	걷는서반대앞지르기, 빠른동작	geonneun seo bandae ap jireugi, ppareun dongjak
21	Move the left foot to C, forming a left walking stance toward C, at the same time executing a rising block with the left forearm.	걷는서추켜막기	geonneun seo chukyeo makgi
22	Move the right foot to C, forming a right walking stance toward C, at the same time executing a rising block with the right forearm.	걷는서추켜막기	geonneun seo chukyeo makgi
23	Move the left foot to B, turning counter-clockwise to form a sitting stance toward D, while executing a middle side strike to B with the left knife-hand.	앉는서손칼옆때리기	anneun seo sonkal yeop ttaerigi
24	Bring the left foot to the right foot, and then move the right foot to A, forming a sitting stance toward A, while executing a middle side strike to A with the right knife-hand.	앉는서손칼옆때리기	anneun seo sonkal yeop ttaerigi
	Move the right foot to parallel ready stance A facing D.	나란히준비서기	narani junbi seogi

== Trivia ==
- Do-San is one of the patterns that refers to the era of colonization of Korea by Japan, next to Joong-Gun, Eui-Am, Ko-Dang, and Sam-Il. Ahn Chang Ho worked together with Ahn Jung Geun and even was arrested after the assassination of the Japanese Resident-General Itō Hirobumi by Ahn Jung Geun.
