= Juche (teul) =

Fifteenth ITF Taekwon-Do pattern

15. Juche
주체
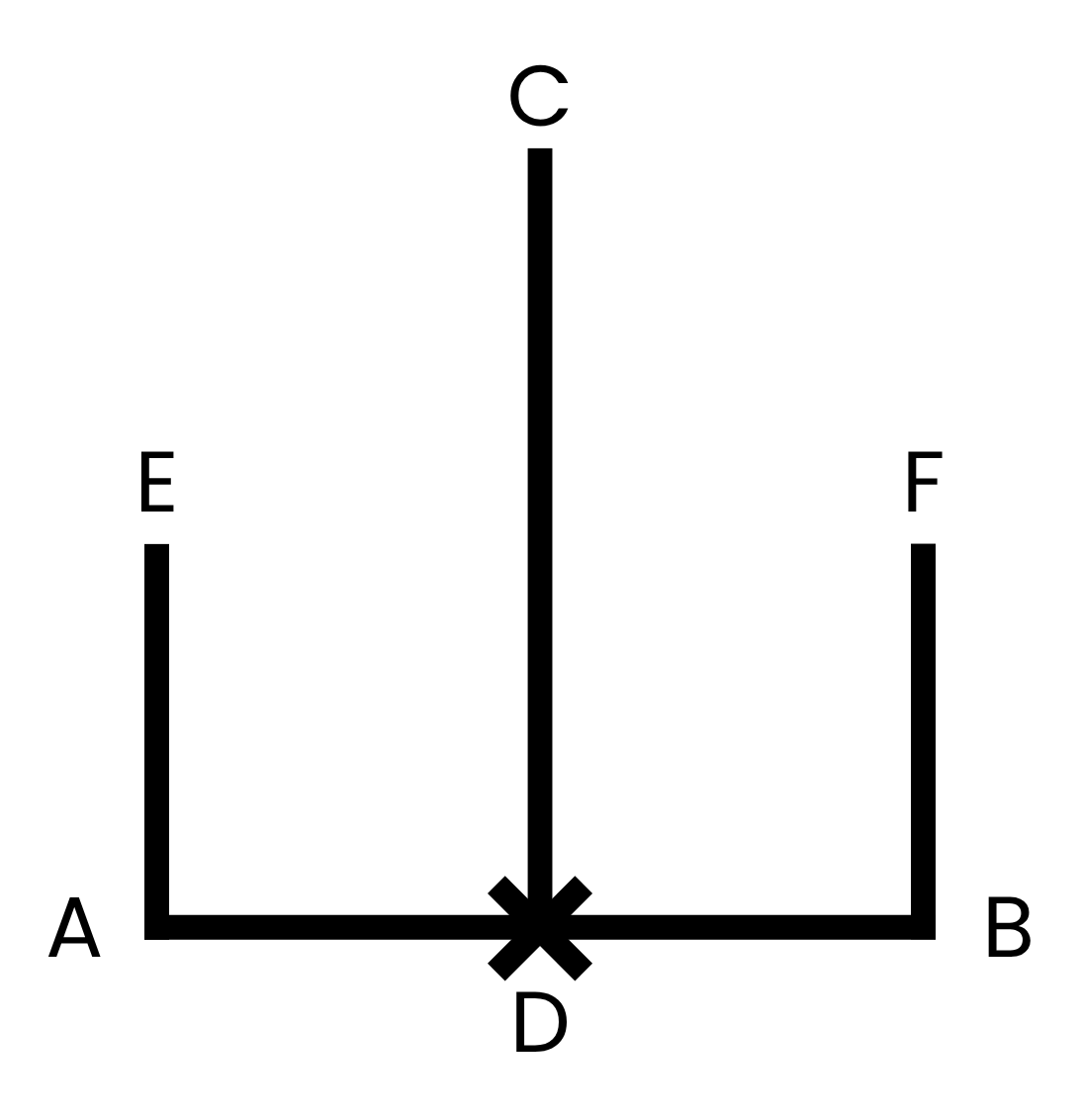
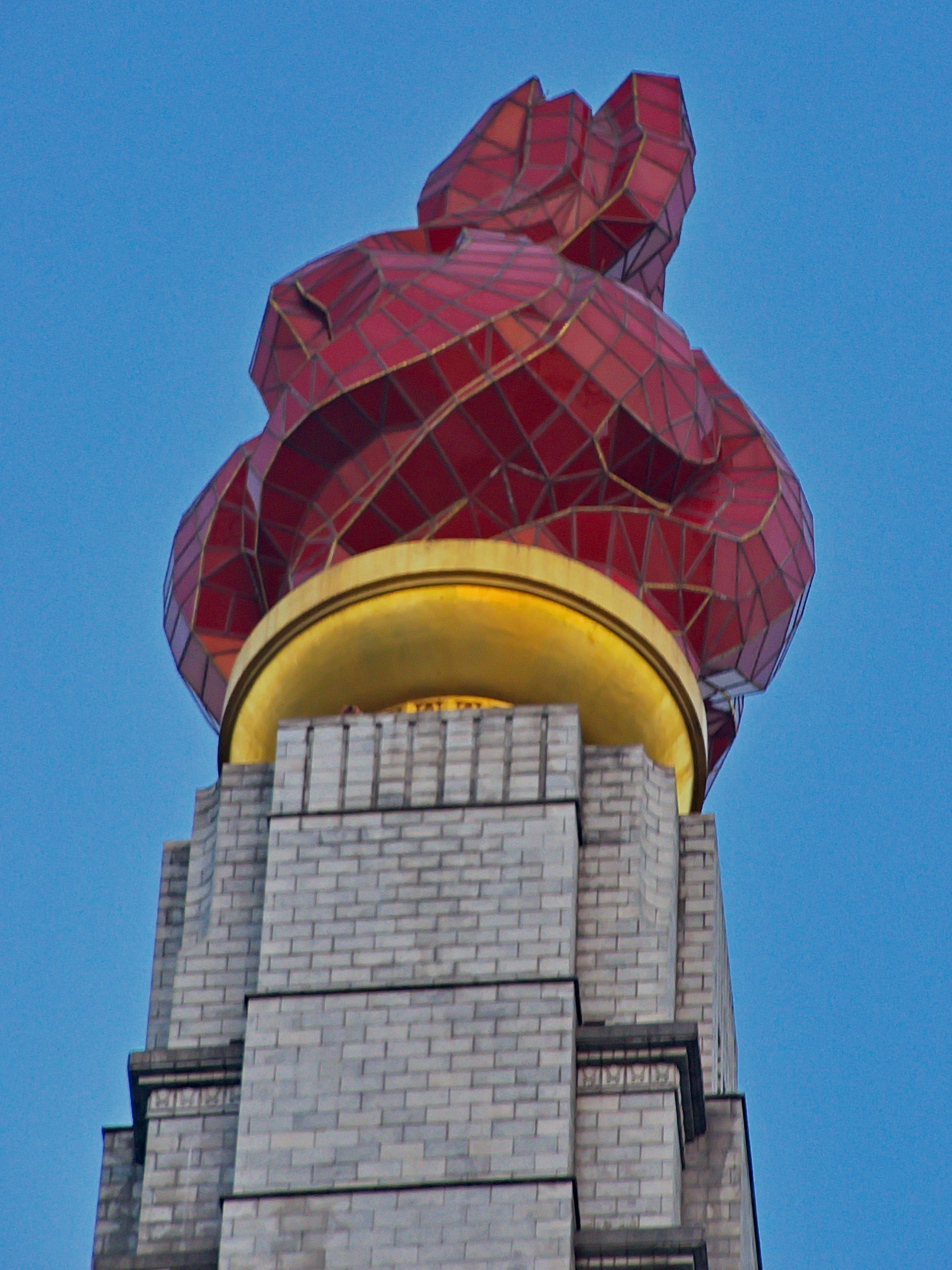
- Diagram of Juche Juche Tower in Pyongyang
- Movements: 45
- Begin stance: Parallel ready stance with twin side elbow
- Return foot: Right
- Meaning: Juche
- Associated dan: 2nd

Juche (Korean: 주체; RR: Juche, Korean pronunciation: [tɕutɕʰe]) is the fifteenth Taekwon-Do teul, as defined by the International Taekwon-Do Federation (ITF). The pattern consists of 45 movements and is taught to students with the 2nd dan (black belt) and necessary to know to obtain the 3rd dan.

== Creation ==
Contrary to the other 23 patterns recognized by the ITF, Juche is a teul that replaced an existing teul, having only been created in the 1980s. The official reason for the replacement of Ko-Dang was that the existing patterns lacked new advanced techniques. General Choi Hong-hi believed that a new teul could best be introduced for second-degree students, as he considered this level to be the physical peak for most students. Out of the three patterns for second degree, Ko-Dang was named after the youngest patriot (the other people being Son Byeonghui and Kim Deokryeong).

However, it is generally agreed that Juche was introduced as a pattern to secure financial support from North Korea. As long as ITF Taekwon-Do maintained Ko-Dang, named after Kim Il Sung's former political rival Jo Mansik, the North Korean authorities were not open to sustain the Taekwon-Do governing body. Initially, Kim Il Sung wanted to have the entire sport renamed to 'Juche Taekwon-Do', so the proposal to only rename a pattern after North Korea's state ideology was considered a compromise. After this deal, Juche was devised in the early 1980s and introduced as an official teul somewhere between 1983 and 1985.

== Meaning ==
Juche is the name of the official ideology of North Korea and the Workers' Party of Korea (WPK), as well as the philosophical principle of Kimilsungism–Kimjongilism. Juche developed in the 1950s and 1960s in reaction to Soviet and Chinese involvement and influence and was established as the sole ideology of the WPK in 1980. The primary objective of Juche is to secure North Korea's political, economic, and military independence, and its core values include autarky, isolationism, and individualism.

=== Controversies ===
While Juche holds a leftist image, a number of scholars argue that it is better characterized as nationalist or far-right, deviating from Marxism–Leninism. The WPK has been accused of Korean nationalism, xenophobia, and racism, inherited from Imperial Japan during its colonial occupation of Korea.

Due to the status of Juche as North Korea's official ideology and its links to xenophobia and racism, some ITF Taekwon-Do schools abstain from the pattern, instead still practising Go-Dang.

=== Number of movements ===
The 45 movements in Juche refer to 1945, the year in which Korea divided into North Korea and South Korea, and Kim Il Sung, the founder of the Juche philosophy, won the Second World War as a member of the Red Army.

== Movements ==
Nr.	English description	Korean description (in Hangul)	Korean description (in Revised Romanisation)
	Parallel ready stance with twin side elbow	나란히허리손서기	narani heorison seogi
1	Move the left foot to B forming a sitting stance toward D while executing a parallel block with the inner forearm.	앉는서안팔목나란히막기	anneun seo an palmok narani makgi
2	Execute a middle hooking block to D with the right palm while standing up toward D.	손바닥가운데걸쳐막기	sonbadak gaunde geolchyeo makgi
3	Execute a middle punch to D with the left fist while forming a sitting stance toward D.	앉는서앞지르기	anneun seo ap jireugi
4	Pull the right reverse footsword to the left knee joint forming a left one-leg stance toward D while executing a parallel block with the outer forearm.	외발서바깥팔목나란히막기	oebal seo bakkat palmok narani makgi
5	Execute a middle side piercing kick to A and then a high reverse hooking kick to B consecutively with the right foot keeping the position of the hands as they were in 4. Perform in slow motion.	가운데옆차지르기, 높은데반대돌려걸어차기, 차례차례동작, 느린동작	gaunde yeop cha jireugi, nopeunde bandae dollyeo georeo chagi, charye charye dongjak, neurin dongjak
6	Lower the right foot to B in a jumping motion to form a right X-stance toward F while executing a downward strike to B with the right back fist.	뛰며겨차서등주먹내려때리기	ttwimyeo gyeocha seo deung jumeok naeryeo ttaerigi
7	Execute a middle hooking kick and then a high side piercing kick to F consecutively with the left foot while pulling both fists in front of the chest.	가운데걸쳐차기, 높운데옆차지르기, 차례차례동작	gaunde geolchyeo chagi, nopunde yeop cha jireugi, charye charye dongjak
8	Lower the left foot to F in a stamping motion to form a sitting stance toward B while executing a high outward cross-cut to F with the left flat finger tip.	구르며앉는서엎은손끝높은데때긋기	gureumyeo anneun seo eopeun sonkkeut nopeunde ttae geutgi
9	Execute a right high elbow strike to BF pressing the right side fist with the left palm while forming a left walking stance toward BF.	걷는서높은팔굽반대때리기	geonneun seo nopeun palgup bandae ttaerigi
10	Cross the left foot over the right foot to form a right X-stance toward B while executing a low front block to B with the left reverse knife-hand, bringing the right finger belly on the left back forearm.	겨차서손칼등낮은데반대앞막기	gyeocha seo sonkal deung najeunde bandae ap makgi
11	Move the right foot to A forming a left L-stance toward A while executing a middle guarding block to A with a knife-hand.	ㄴ자서손칼대비막기	nieunja seo sonkal daebi makgi
12	Execute a mid-air strike to A with a left knife-hand while spinning counter clockwise and then land to A forming a right L-stance toward A with the left arm extended.	손칼뛰어돌며때리기	sonkal ttwieo dolmyeo ttaerigi
13	Move the right foot to A to form a sitting stance toward D while executing a parallel block with the inner forearm.	앉는서안팔목나란히막기	anneun seo an palmok narani makgi
14	Execute a middle hooking block to D with the left palm while standing up toward D.	손바닥가운데걸쳐막기	sonbadak gaunde geolchyeo makgi
15	Execute a middle punch to D with the right fist while forming a sitting stance toward D.	앉는서앞지르기	anneun seo ap jireugi
16	Pull the left reverse footsword to the right knee joint forming a right one-leg stance toward D while executing a parallel block with the outer forearm.	외발서바깥팔목나란히막기	oebal seo bakkat palmok narani makgi
17	Execute a middle side piercing kick to B and then a high reverse hooking kick to A consecutively with the left foot keeping the position of the hands as they were in 16. Perform in slow motion.	가운데옆차지르기, 높은데반대돌려걸어차기, 차례차례동작, 느린동작	gaunde yeop cha jireugi, nopeunde bandae dollyeo georeo chagi, charye charye dongjak, neurin dongjak
18	Lower the left foot to A in a jumping motion to form a left X-stance toward E while executing a downward strike to A with the left back fist.	뛰며겨차서등주먹내려때리기	ttwimyeo gyeocha seo deung jumeok naeryeo ttaerigi
19	Execute a middle hooking kick and then a high side piercing kick to E consecutively with the right foot while pulling both fists in front of the chest.	가운데걸쳐차기, 높운데옆차지르기, 차례차례동작	gaunde geolchyeo chagi, nopunde yeop cha jireugi, charye charye dongjak
20	Lower the right foot to E in a stamping motion to form a sitting stance toward A while executing a high outward cross-cut to E with the right flat finger tip.	구르며앉는서엎은손끝높은데때긋기	gureumyeo anneun seo eopeun sonkkeut nopeunde ttae geutgi
21	Execute a left high elbow strike to AE pressing the left side fist with the right palm while forming a right walking stance toward AE.	걷는서높은팔굽반대때리기	geonneun seo nopeun palgup bandae ttaerigi
22	Cross the right foot over the left foot to form a left X-stance toward A while executing a low front block to A with the right reverse knife-hand, bringing the left finger belly on the right back forearm.	겨차서손칼등낮은데반대앞막기	gyeocha seo sonkal deung najeunde bandae ap makgi
23	Move the left foot to B forming a right L-stance toward B while executing a middle guarding block to B with a knife-hand.	ㄴ자서손칼대비막기	nieunja seo sonkal daebi makgi
24	Execute a mid-air strike to B with a right knife-hand while spinning clockwise and then land to B forming a left L-stance toward B with the right arm extended.	손칼뛰어돌며때리기	sonkal ttwieo dolmyeo ttaerigi
25	Execute a pick-shape kick to B with the left foot and then lower it to B forming a right rear foot stance toward B while executing a middle guarding block with the forearm.	곡괭이차기, 뒷발서대비막기	gokgwaengi chagi, dwitbal seo daebi makgi
26	Bring the right foot to the left foot forming a closed stance with a heaven hand toward D. Perform in slow motion.	모아서기. 느린동작	moa seogi. neurin dongjak
27	Slide to C to form a left rear foot stance toward D while executing a downward thrust with the right straight elbow.	미끌며뒷발서선팔굽반대내려뚫기	mikkeulmyeo dwitbal seo seon palgup bandae naeryeo ttulki
28	Execute a high crescent strike with the left arc-hand while forming a right walking stance toward D, slipping the right foot.	걷는서반달손높은데반대반대때리기	geonneun seo bandalson nopeunde bandae bandae ttaerigi
29	Slide to C to form a right rear foot stance toward D while executing a downward thrust with the left straight elbow.	미끌며뒷발서선팔굽반대내려뚫기	mikkeulmyeo dwitbal seo seon palgup bandae naeryeo ttulki
30	Execute a high crescent strike with the right arc-hand while forming a left walking stance toward D, slipping the left foot.	걷는서반달손높은데반대반대때리기	geonneun seo bandalson nopeunde bandae bandae ttaerigi
31	Move the left foot to C forming a right walking stance toward D while executing a high inward strike to D with a twin knife-hand.	걷는서쌍손칼높은데안으로때리기	geonneun seo ssang sonkal nopeunde aneuro ttaerigi
32	Move the right foot to C forming a left walking stance toward D while executing a downward punch with the right fist.	걷는서반대내려지르기	geonneun seo bandae naeryeo jireugi
33	Move the left foot to the side rear of the right foot and then slide to C forming a right L-stance toward D while executing a downward block with the left outer forearm.	뒤로이보옮겨디디며미끌기ㄴ자서바깥팔목반대내려막기	dwiro ibo olgyeo didimyeo mikkeulgi nieunja seo bakkat palmok bandae naeryeo makgi
34	Execute a dodging reverse hooking kick to D with the right foot while flying away from D and then land to C to form a left L-stance toward D at the same time executing a middle guarding block to D with the forearm.	피하며반대돌려차기, ㄴ자서대비막기	pihamyeo bandae dollyeo chagi, nieunja seo daebi makgi
35	Move the right foot to the side rear of the left foot and then slide to C forming a left L-stance toward D while executing a downward block with the right outer forearm.	뒤로이보옮겨디디며미끌기ㄴ자서바깥팔목반대내려막기	dwiro ibo olgyeo didimyeo mikkeulgi nieunja seo bakkat palmok bandae naeryeo makgi
36	Execute a dodging reverse hooking kick to D with the left foot while flying away from D and then land to C to form a right L-stance toward D at the same time executing a middle guarding block to D with the forearm.	피하며반대돌려차기, ㄴ자서목낮대비막기	pihamyeo bandae dollyeo chagi, nieunja seo daebi makgi
37	Move the right foot to D and then the left foot to D then execute a flying two direction kick (twisting kick with the left foot, side piercing with the right foot) while flying to D.	삼보옮겨디디며나가기뛰며쌍방차기	sambo olgyeo didimyeo nagagi ttwimyeo ssang bang chagi
38	Land to D to form a left diagonal stance toward D while executing a rising block with a twin palm.	사선서쌍손바닥추켜막기	saseon seo ssang sonbadak chukyeo makgi
39	Slide to D forming a right rear foot stance toward C while executing a side thrust to D with the right elbow.	미끌며뒷발서때팔굽뚫기	mikkeulmyeo dwitbal seo ttae palgup ttulki
40	Turn the face to D while forming a right bending ready stance B toward C and then execute a middle back piercing kick to D with the left foot. Perform in slow motion.	구부려준비서기, 가운데뒷차지르기, 느린동작	guburyeo junbi seogi, gaunde dwit cha jireugi, neurin dongjak
41	Lower the left foot to D in a stamping motion forming a right L-stance toward D at the same time executing a horizontal strike to D with the left back fist.	구르며ㄴ자서등주먹반대수평때리기	gureumyeo nieunja seo deung jumeok bandae supyeong ttaerigi
42	Execute a high inward cross-cut to D with the right flat finger tip while forming a parallel stance toward D, pulling the right foot.	나란히서엎은손끝높은데안으로긋기	narani seo eopeun sonkkeut nopeunde aneuro geutgi
43	Execute a front punch and an upset punch to D consecutively with the right fist while flying to D and then land to D forming a closed stance toward D with the right fist extended.	뛰며연속지르기, 차례차례동작	ttwimyeo yeonsok jireugi, charye charye dongjak
44	Move the right foot to D forming a right walking stance toward D while executing a front downward strike with the left knife-hand.	걷는서손칼반대앞내려때리기	geonneun seo sonkal bandae ap naeryeo ttaerigi
45	Move the left foot to D forming a left walking stance toward D while executing a middle punch to D with the right fist.	걷는서반대앞지르기	geonneun seo bandae ap jireugi
	Move the right foot to the parallel ready stance with twin side elbow.	나란히허리손서기	narani heorison seogi

== Trivia ==
- Juche is one of two patterns that refer to the Division of Korea period, the other one being the former teul U-Nam.
- Juche is one of the few teul that are not named after people, together with Chon-Ji, Sam-Il, and Tong-Il.
- The ready stance represents a common standing posture of Kim Il Sung.
- The diagram of the pattern, as well as the pattern's first and thirteenth movements, represent the Hanja character for 'mountain' (山). This refers to Mount Baekdu, where Kim Il Sung claimed to have thought first of the Juche idea.

== Sources ==
- Suh, Dae-sook (1988). Kim Il Sung: The North Korean Leader. New York: Columbia University Press. ISBN 9780231065733.
