= Chon-Ji (teul) =

First ITF Taekwon-Do pattern

1. Chon-Ji
천지
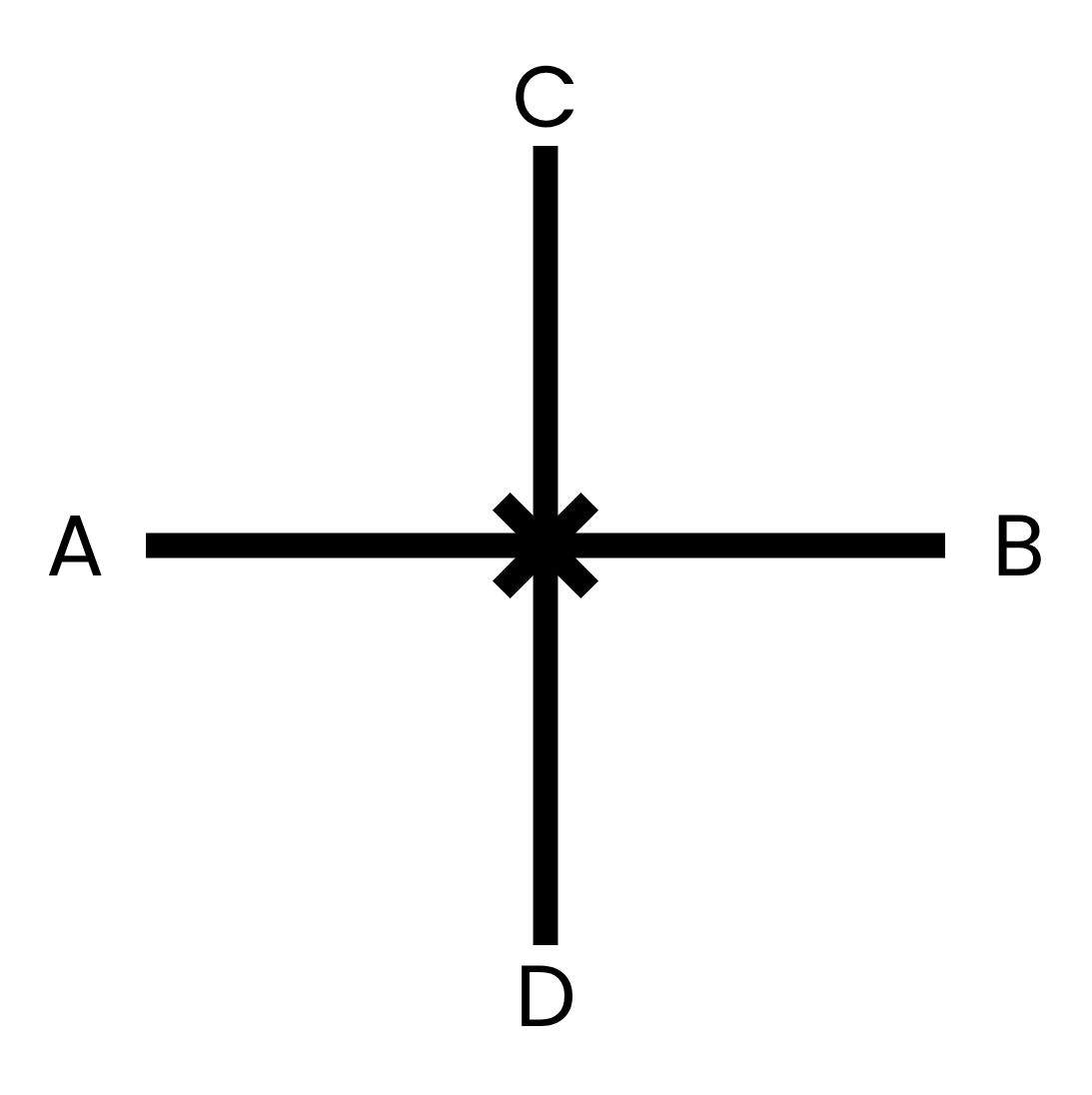
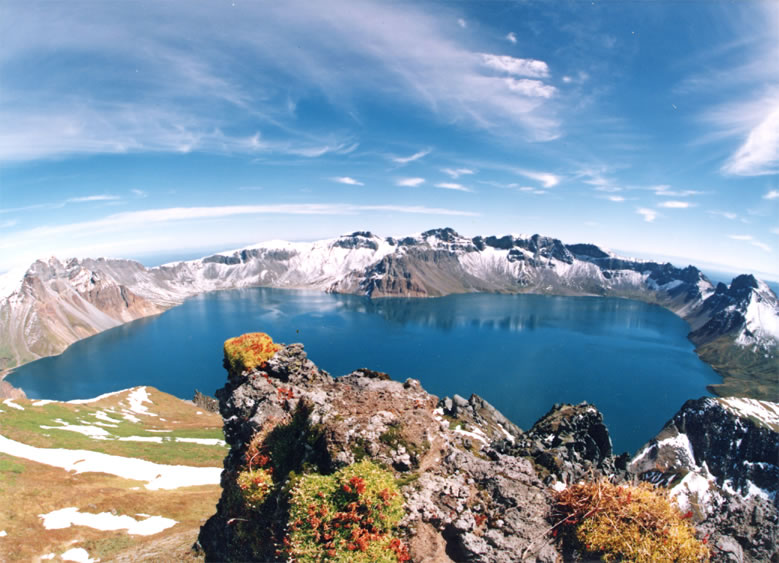
- Diagram of Chon-Ji The Heaven Lake
- Movements: 19
- Begin stance: Parallel ready stance A
- Return foot: Right
- Meaning: Heaven and earth
- Associated geup: 9th

Chon-Ji (Korean: 천지; RR: Cheonji; lit. 'heaven and earth', Korean pronunciation: [tɕʰʌn.tɕi]) is the first Taekwon-Do teul, as defined by the International Taekwon-Do Federation. The pattern consists of 19 movements and is taught to students with the 9th geup (white-yellow belt) and necessary to know to obtain the 8th geup (yellow belt).

== Meaning ==
When read in Hanja, chon (天) means 'heaven' and ji (地) means 'earth'. Together, chonji refers to the Heaven Lake in North Korea. Moreover, 'heaven and earth' refers to the beginning of the world according to Korean mythology. According to Korean legends, the deity Dangun lived at the Heaven Lake. Similarly, the pattern is the beginning of the Taekwon-Do career of each student.

=== Number of movements ===
The tricolored taegeuk

Concerning the number of movements of the pattern, it has previously been believed that Chon-Ji had 19 movements to represent each degree a Taekwon-Do student can obtain (10 geup degrees and 9 dan degrees). However, this is not possible, because the pattern has been devised between 1962 and 1964, when there were only 17 degrees in total.

Instead, the number refers to the tricoloured taegeuk. The pattern consists of two sets of eight movements (in reference to the eight trigrams around the taegeuk) and one set of three movements. The first set refers to heaven, as chon means 'heaven', and the second to earth, with ji meaning 'Earth'. The third set has three movements because the trigrams consist of three stripes and because the tricoloured taegeuk has three colours: blue, red, and yellow, representing heaven, earth, and humanity, respectively.

== Movements ==
| Nr. | English description | Korean description (in Hangul) | Korean description (in Revised Romanisation) |
|---|---|---|---|
| | Parallel ready stance A facing D | 나란히준비서기 | narani junbi seogi |
| 1 | Move the left foot to B to form a left walking stance towards B, while executing a low outer forearm block to B with the left forearm. | 걷는서팔목낮은데막기 | geonneun seo palmok najeunde makgi |
| 2 | Move the right foot to B to form a right walking stance towards B, while executing a middle obverse forefist punch towards B with the right hand. | 걷는서앞지르기 | geonneun seo ap jireugi |
| 3 | Move the right foot to A (turning clockwise) to form a right walking stance towards A, while executing a low outer forearm block to A with the right forearm. | 걷는서팔목낮은데막기 | geonneun seo palmok najeunde makgi |
| 4 | Move the left foot to A to form a left walking stance towards A, while executing a middle obverse forefist punch towards A with the left hand. | 걷는서앞지르기 | geonneun seo ap jireugi |
| 5 | Move the left foot to D (turning counter-clockwise) to form a left walking stance towards D, while executing a low outer forearm block to D with the left forearm. | 걷는서팔목낮은데막기 | geonneun seo palmok najeunde makgi |
| 6 | Move the right foot to D to form a right walking stance towards D, while executing a middle obverse forefist punch towards D with the right hand. | 걷는서앞지르기 | geonneun seo ap jireugi |
| 7 | Move the right foot to C (turning clockwise) to form a right walking stance towards C, while executing a low outer forearm block to C with the right forearm. | 걷는서팔목낮은데막기 | geonneun seo palmok najeunde makgi |
| 8 | Move the left foot to C to form a left walking stance towards C, while executing a middle obverse forefist punch towards C with the left hand. | 걷는서앞지르기 | geonneun seo ap jireugi |
| 9 | Move the left foot to A (turning counter-clockwise) to form a right L-stance towards A, while executing a middle inner forearm block to A with the left forearm. | ㄴ자서안팔목가운데옆막기 | nieunja seo an palmok gaunde yeop makgi |
| 10 | Move the right foot to A to form a right walking stance towards A, while executing a middle obverse forefist punch towards A with the right hand. | 걷는서앞지르기 | geonneun seo ap jireugi |
| 11 | Move the right foot to B (turning clockwise) to form a left L-stance towards B, while executing a middle inner forearm block to B with the right forearm. | ㄴ자서안팔목가운데옆막기 | nieunja seo an palmok gaunde yeop makgi |
| 12 | Move the left foot to B to form a left walking stance towards B, while executing a middle obverse forefist punch towards B with the left hand. | 걷는서앞지르기 | geonneun seo ap jireugi |
| 13 | Move the left foot to C (turning counter-clockwise) to form a right L-stance towards C, while executing a middle inner forearm block to C with the left forearm. | ㄴ자서안팔목가운데옆막기 | nieunja seo an palmok gaunde yeop makgi |
| 14 | Move the right foot to C to form a right walking stance towards C, while executing a middle obverse forefist punch towards C with the right hand. | 걷는서앞지르기 | geonneun seo ap jireugi |
| 15 | Move the right foot to D (turning clockwise) to form a left L-stance towards D, while executing a middle inner forearm block to D with the right forearm. | ㄴ자서안팔목가운데옆막기 | nieunja seo an palmok gaunde yeop makgi |
| 16 | Move the left foot to D to form a left walking stance towards D, while executing a middle obverse forefist punch towards D with the left hand. | 걷는서앞지르기 | geonneun seo ap jireugi |
| 17 | Move the right foot to D to form a right walking stance towards D, while executing a middle obverse forefist punch towards D with the right hand. | 걷는서앞지르기 | geonneun seo ap jireugi |
| 18 | Step backwards by moving the right foot to C to form a left walking stance towards D, while executing a middle obverse forefist punch towards D with the left hand. | 걷는서앞지르기 | geonneun seo ap jireugi |
| 19 | Step backwards by moving the left foot to C to form a right walking stance towards D, while executing a middle obverse forefist punch towards D with the right hand. | 걷는서앞지르기 | geonneun seo ap jireugi |
| | Move the right foot to parallel ready stance A facing D. | 나란히준비서기 | narani junbi seogi |

== Trivia ==
- Chon-Ji is one of the few teul that are not named after people, together with Juche, Sam-Il, and Tong-Il.
