= 世宗 =

世宗 may refer to several Chinese, Korean and Vietnamese monarchs.

- Shizong (disambiguation)#people, several Chinese monarchs
- Sejong the Great (1397–1450, reigned 1418–1450), Korean monarch of the Joseon dynasty
- Thế Tông (disambiguation), several Vietnamese monarchs
