= Hwa-Rang (teul) =

Eighth ITF Taekwon-Do pattern

8. Hwa-Rang
화랑
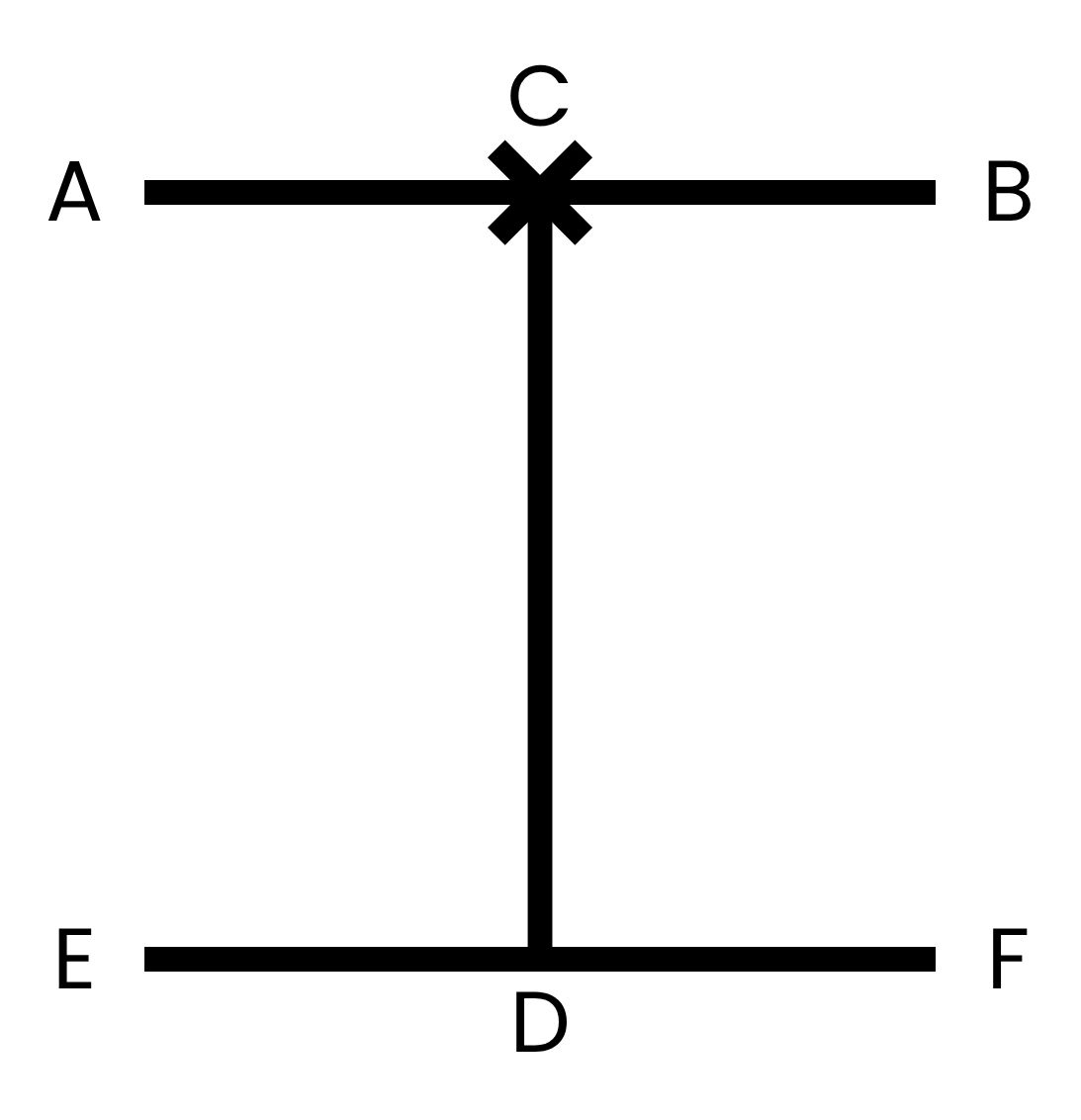
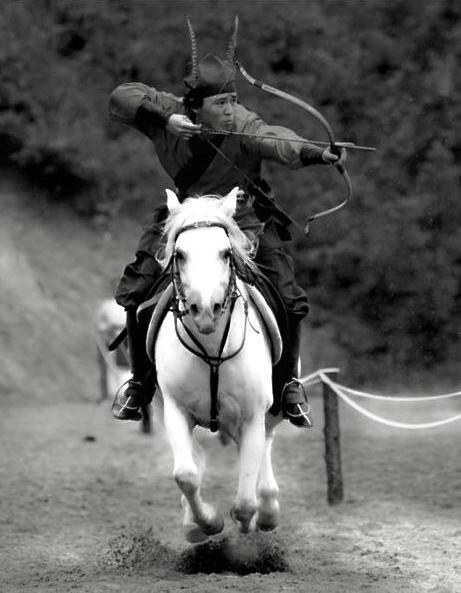
- Diagram of Hwa-Rang teul Hwarang warrior (reconstruction)
- Movements: 29
- Begin stance: Closed ready stance C
- Return foot: Right
- Meaning: Hwarang
- Associated geup: 2nd

Hwa-Rang (Korean: 화랑; RR: Hwarang, Korean pronunciation: [hwa.laŋ]) is the eighth Taekwon-Do teul, as defined by the International Taekwon-Do Federation. The pattern consists of 29 movements and is taught to students with the 2nd geup (red belt) and necessary to know to obtain the 1st geup (red-black belt).

== Meaning ==
The pattern is named after the Hwarang, an elite warrior group of young men in Silla, existing from the 6th to the 10th century. The Hwarang trained in horsemanship, swordsmanship, archery, javelin and stone throwing, polo, and ladder-climbing, while they were also educated in ethics.

=== Number of movements ===
Hwa-Rang's 29 movements refer to the 29th Infantry Division of the Republic of Korea Army in which Taekwon-Do was developed. Choi Hong-hi, the founder of Taekwon-Do and general of the 29th Division, applied training techniques of the Hwarang to his own troops.

== Movements ==
Nr.	English description	Korean description (in Hangul)	Korean description (in Revised Romanisation)
	Closed ready stance C facing D	모아준비서기	moa junbi seogi
1	Move the left foot to B to form a sitting stance toward D while executing a middle pushing block to D with the left palm.	앉는서손바닥밀어막기	anneun seo sonbadak mireo makgi
2	Execute a middle punch to D with the right fist while maintaining a sitting stance toward D.	앉는서앞지르기	anneun seo ap jireugi
3	Execute a middle punch to D with the left fist while maintaining a sitting stance toward D.	앉는서앞지르기	anneun seo ap jireugi
4	Execute a twin forearm block while forming a left L-stance toward A, pivoting with the left foot.	ㄴ자서쌍팔목막기	nieunja seo ssang palmok makgi
5	Execute an upward punch with the left fist while pulling the right side fist in front of the left shoulder, maintaining a left L-stance toward A.	ㄴ자서앞주먹올려지르기	nieunja seo ap jumeok gollyeo jireugi
6	Execute a middle punch to A with the right fist forming a right fixed stance toward A in a sliding motion.	미끌며고정서바로앞지르기	mikkeul myeo gojeong seo baro ap jireugi
7	Execute a downward strike with the right knife-hand while forming a left vertical stance toward A, pulling the right foot.	수직서손칼때내려때리기	sujik seo sonkal ttaenaeryeo ttaerigi
8	Move the left foot to A, forming a left walking stance toward A while executing a middle punch to A with the left fist.	걷는서앞지르기	geonneun seo ap jireugi
9	Move the left foot to D, forming a left walking stance toward D while executing a low block to D with the left forearm.	걷는서팔목낮은데막기	geonneun seo palmok najeunde makgi
10	Move the right foot to D, forming a right walking stance toward D while executing a middle punch to D with the right fist.	걷는서앞지르기	geonneun seo ap jireugi
11	Pull the left foot toward the right foot while bringing the left palm to the right forefist, at the same time bending the right elbow about 45 degrees outward.	빼기	ppaegi
12	Execute a middle side piercing kick to D with the right foot while pulling both hands in the opposite direction, and then lower it to D, forming a left L-stance toward D, at the same time executing a middle outward strike to D with the right knife-hand.	가운데옆차지르기, ㄴ자서손칼옆때리기	gaunde yeop cha jireugi, nieunja seo sonkal yeop ttaerigi
13	Move the left foot to D, forming a left walking stance toward D while executing a middle punch to D with the left fist.	걷는서앞지르기	geonneun seo ap jireugi
14	Move the right foot to D, forming a right walking stance toward D while executing a middle punch to D with the right fist.	걷는서앞지르기	geonneun seo ap jireugi
15	Move the left foot to E, turning counter-clockwise to form a right L-stance toward E while executing a middle guarding block to E with a knife-hand.	ㄴ자서손칼대비막기	nieunja seo sonkal daebi makgi
16	Move the right foot to E, forming a right walking stance toward E while executing a middle thrust to E with the right straight fingertip.	걷는서선손끝뚫기	geonneun seo seonsonkkeut ttulki
17	Move the right foot on the line EF, forming a right L-stance toward F while executing a middle guarding block to F with a knife-hand.	ㄴ자서손칼대비막기	nieunja seo sonkal daebi makgi
18	Execute a high turning kick to DF with the right foot and then lower it to F.	높은데돌려차기	nopeunde dollyeo chagi
19	Execute a high turning kick to CF with the left foot and then lower it to F, forming a right L-stance toward F while executing a middle guarding block to F with a knife-hand. Perform 18 and 19 in a fast motion.	높은데돌려차기, ㄴ자서손칼대비막기, 빠른동작	nopeunde dollyeo chagi, nieunja seo sonkal daebi makgi, ppareun dongjak
20	Move the left foot to C, forming a left walking stance toward C while executing a low block to C with left forearm.	걷는서팔목낮은데막기	geonneun seo palmok najeunde makgi
21	Execute a middle punch to C with the right fist while forming a right L-stance toward C, pulling the left foot.	ㄴ자서바로앞지르기	nieunja seo baro ap jireugi
22	Move the right foot to C, forming a left L-stance toward C while executing a middle punch to C with the left fist.	ㄴ자서바로앞지르기	nieunja seo baro ap jireugi
23	Move the left foot to C, forming a right L-stance toward C, at the same time executing a middle punch to C with the right fist.	ㄴ자서바로앞지르기	nieunja seo baro ap jireugi
24	Execute a pressing block with an X-fist while forming a left walking stance toward C, slipping the left foot to C.	걷는서교차주먹눌러막기	geonneun seo gyocha jumeok nulleo makgi
25	Move the right foot to C in a sliding motion, forming a right L-stance toward D while thrusting to C with the right side elbow.	미끌며ㄴ자서때팔굽뚫기	mikkeul myeo nieunja seo ttaepalgup ttulki
26	Bring the left foot to the right foot, turning counter-clockwise to form a close stance toward B while executing a side front block with the right inner forearm while extending the left forearm to the side downward.	모아서안팔목옆앞막기	moa seo an palmok yeop ap makgi
27	Execute a side front block with the left inner forearm, extending the right forearm to the side-downward while maintaining a close stance toward B.	모아서안팔목옆앞막기	moa seo an palmok yeop ap makgi
28	Move the left foot to B, forming a right L-stance toward B, at the same time executing a middle guarding block to B with a knifehand.	ㄴ자서손칼대비막기	nieunja seo sonkal daebi makgi
29	Bring the left foot to the right foot and then move the right foot to A, forming left L-stance toward A while executing a middle guarding block to A with a knife-hand.	ㄴ자서손칼대비막기	nieunja seo sonkal daebi makgi
	Move the right foot to the closed ready stance C facing D.	모아준비서기	moa junbi seogi

== Trivia ==
- Hwa-Rang is one the teul that refers to the Kingdom of Silla, next to Won-Hyo, Yoo-Sin, and Moon-Moo. Both Wonhyo and Kim Yusin were Hwarang warriors.
- Despite being the 8th teul, Hwa-Rang was the first teul ever developed, as it was created in 1955.
- Just like the Taekwon-Do student oath, the Hwarang warriors had five commandments:
1. Show allegiance to one's sovereign.
2. Treat one's parents with respect and devotion.
3. Exhibit trust and sincerity amongst friends.
4. Never retreat in battle.
5. Exercise discretion when taking a life.
