= Shizong =

Shizong may refer to:

== Locations ==
- Shizong County (师宗县), a county in Yunnan, China
- Shizong Town (十总镇), a town in Nantong, Jiangsu, China

== People ==
Shizong
- Chinese: 世宗
- Literal meaning: Generational Ancestor
Transcriptions
Standard Mandarin
- Hanyu Pinyin: Shìzōng
- Wade–Giles: Shih^{4}-tsung^{1}

Shizong is an imperial temple name accorded to several Chinese monarchs. It may refer to:

- Liu Che (156–87 BC, reigned 141–87 BC), also known as Emperor Wu, Han dynasty emperor
- Sima Shi (208–255), Cao Wei regent, posthumously honored as Shizong of the Jin dynasty (266–420)
- Zhouhezhu (周曷朱) (fl. 3rd century), father of Shi Le, posthumously honored as Shizong of Later Zhao
- Fu Jian (317–355) (reigned 351–355), also known as Emperor Gaozu and Emperor Jingming, Former Qin's founding emperor
- Zhang Chonghua (327–353, reigned 346–353), Former Liang ruler
- Murong De (336–405, reigned 398–405), also known as Emperor Xianwu, Southern Yan's founding emperor
- Xiao Zhangmao (458–493), Southern Qi crown prince, posthumously honored as Shizong of Southern Qi
- Yuan Ke (483–515, reigned 499–515), also known as Emperor Xuanwu, Northern Wei emperor
- Gao Cheng (521–549), Eastern Wei regent, posthumously honored as Shizong of Northern Qi
- Yuwen Yu (534–560, reigned 557–560), also known as Emperor Ming, Northern Zhou emperor
- Xiao Kui (542–585, reigned 562–585), also known as Emperor Ming, Western Liang emperor
- Yang Zhao (584–606), Sui dynasty crown prince, posthumously honored as Shizong of Sui
- Qian Yuanguan (887–941, reigned 932–941), ruler of Wuyue
- Yelü Ruan (918–951, reigned 947–951), Liao dynasty emperor
- Chai Rong (921–959, reigned 954–959), Later Zhou emperor
- Wanyan Yong (1123–1189, reigned 1161–1189), emperor of the Jin dynasty (1115–1234)
- Zhu Houcong (1507–1567, reigned 1521–1567), also known as Jiajing Emperor, Ming dynasty emperor
- Yinzhen (1678–1735, reigned 1723–1735), also known as Yongzheng Emperor, Qing dynasty emperor

== See also ==
- Thế Tông (disambiguation), Vietnamese equivalent
- Sejong (disambiguation), Korean equivalent
