= Choong-Moo (teul) =

Ninth ITF Taekwon-Do pattern

9. Choong-Moo
충무
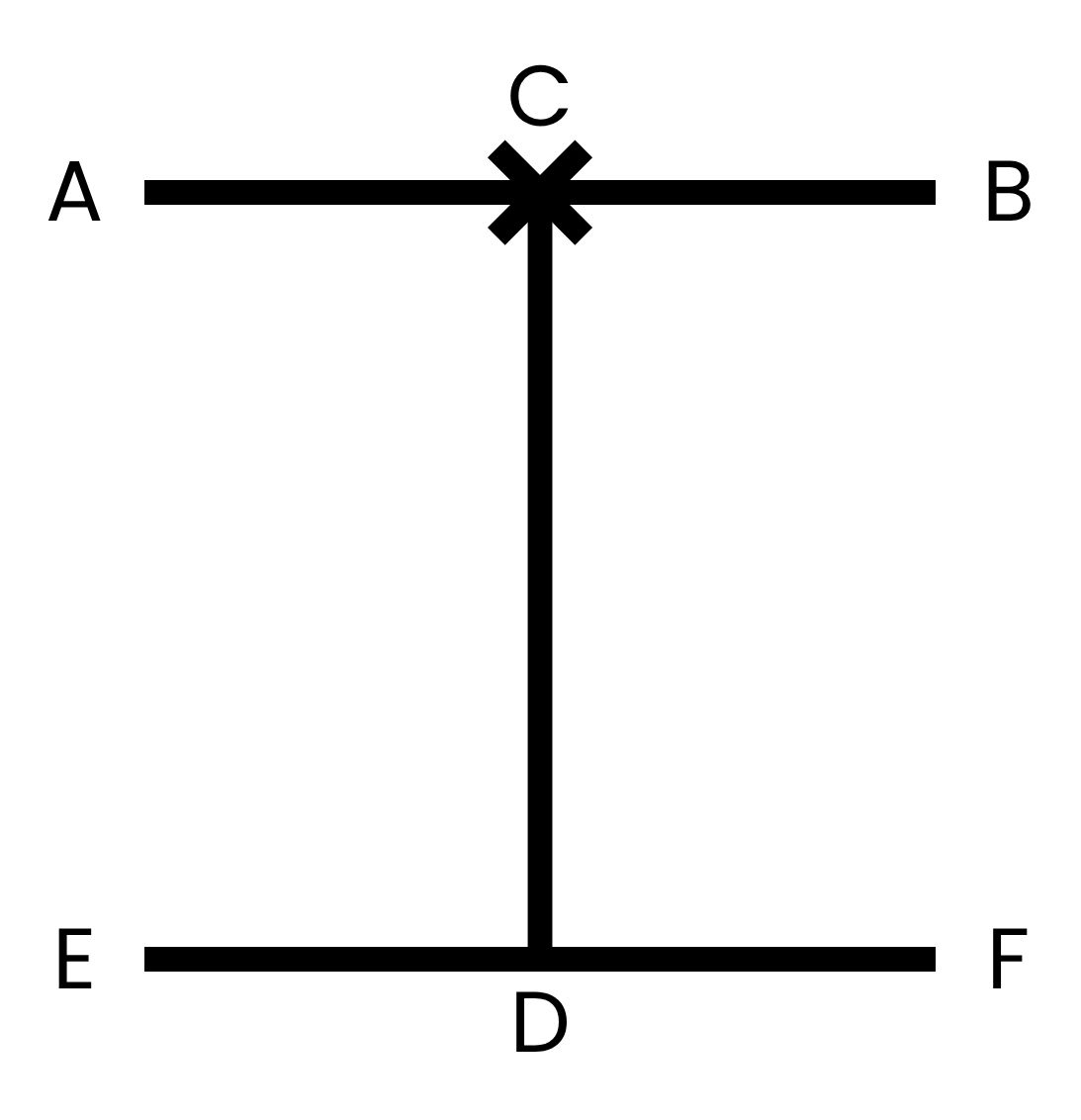
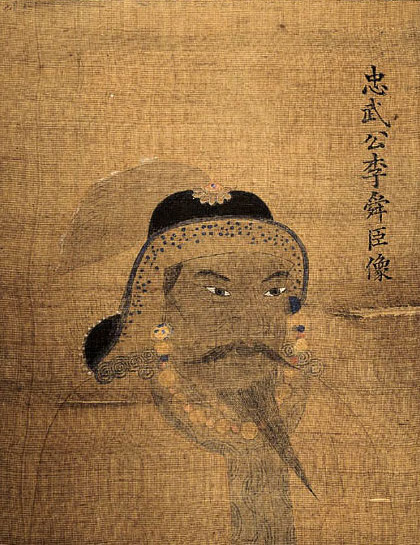
- Diagram of Choong-Moo Yi Sun-sin
- Movements: 30
- Begin stance: Parallel ready stance A
- Return foot: Left
- Meaning: Yi Sun-sin
- Associated geup: 1st

Choong-Moo (Korean: 충무; RR: Chungmu, Korean pronunciation: [tɕʰuŋ.mu]) is the ninth Taekwon-Do teul, as defined by the International Taekwon-Do Federation. The pattern consists of 30 movements and is taught to students with the 1st geup (red-black belt) and necessary to know to obtain the 1st dan (black belt).

== Meaning ==
The pattern's name refers to Yi Sun-sin (posthumous name Chungmu), a 16th-century Korean admiral and military general. He is especially known for his victories against the Japanese navy during the Imjin War. Yi is considered one of history's greatest naval commanders and a prominent figure in Korean history, with landmarks, awards, and towns named after him, as well as numerous films and documentaries about his achievements.

=== Number of movements ===
While the reason to include 30 movements in Choong-Moo has never been confirmed, it is most likely that is refers to the number of ships that Yi Sun-sin destroyed during the Battle of Noryang, in which the Japanese navy was finally defeated and Yi Sun-sin passed away.

== Movements ==
Nr.	English description	Korean description (in Hangul)	Korean description (in Revised Romanisation)
	Parallel ready stance A facing D	나란히준비서기	narani junbi seogi
1	Move the left foot to B, forming a right L-stance toward B while executing a twin knifehand block.	ㄴ자서쌍손칼막기	nieunja seo ssang sonkal makgi
2	Move the right foot to B, forming a right walking stance B while executing a high front strike to B with the right knifehand and bring the left back hand in front of the forehead.	걷는서손칼데옆때앞때리기	geonneun seo sonkal de yeop ttae ap ttaerigi
3	Move the right foot to A, turning clockwise to form a left L-stance toward A while executing a middle guarding block to A with a knifehand.	ㄴ자서손칼대비막기	nieunja seo sonkal daebi makgi
4	Move the left foot to A, forming a left walking stance toward A while executing a high thrust to A with the left flat fingertip.	걷는서엎은손끝높은데뚫기	geonneun seo eopeun sonkkeut nopeunde ttulki
5	Move the left foot to D, forming a right L-stance toward D while executing a middle guarding block to D with a knifehand.	ㄴ자서손칼대비막기	nieunja seo sonkal daebi makgi
6	Turn the face to C, forming a left bending ready stance (A) toward C.	구부려준비서기	guburyeo junbi seogi
7	Execute a middle side piercing kick to C with the right foot.	가운데옆차지르기	gaunde yeop cha jireugi
8	Lower the right foot to C, forming a right L-stance toward D while executing a middle guarding block to D with a knife-hand.	ㄴ자서손칼대비막기	nieunja seo sonkal daebi makgi
9	Execute a flying side piercing kick to D with the right foot soon after moving it to D and then land to D, forming a left L-stance toward D while executing a middle guarding block to D with a knife-hand.	뛰며옆차지르기, ㄴ자서손칼대비막기	ttwimyeo yeop cha jireugi, nieunja seo sonkal daebi makgi
10	Move the left foot to E, turning counter-clockwise to form a right Lstance toward E, at the same time executing a low block to E with the left forearm.	ㄴ자서팔목낮은데막기	nieunja seo palmok najeunde makgi
11	Extend both hands upward as if to grab the opponent's head while forming a left walking stance toward E, slipping the left foot to E.	걷는준비서기	geonneun junbi seogi
12	Execute an upward kick to E with the right knee, pulling both hands downward.	무릎올려차기	mureup ollyeo chagi
13	Lower the right foot to the left foot and then move the left foot to F, forming a left walking stance toward F while executing a high front strike to F with the right reverse knife-hand, bringing the left back hand under the right elbow joint.	걷는서손칼등데옆때앞때리기	geonneun seo sonkal deung de yeop ttae ap ttaerigi
14	Execute a high turning kick to DF with the right foot and then lower it to the left foot.	높은데돌려차기	nopeunde dollyeo chagi
15	Execute a middle back piercing kick to F with the left foot. Perform 14 and 15 in a fast motion.	가운데뒷차지르기, 빠른동작	gaunde dwit cha jireugi, ppareun dongjak
16	Lower the left foot to F, forming a left L-stance toward E while executing a middle guarding block to E with the forearm.	ㄴ자서대비막기	nieunja seo daebi makgi
17	Execute a middle turning kick to DE with the left foot.	가운데돌려차기	gaunde dollyeo chagi
18	Lower the left foot to the right foot and then move the right foot to C, forming a right fixed stance toward C while executing U-shape block toward C.	고정서ㄷ자막기	gojeong seo digeutja makgi
19	Jump and spin around counter-clockwise, landing on the same spot to form a left L-stance toward C while executing a middle guarding block to C with a knifehand.	뛰며돌며ㄴ자서손칼대비막기	ttwimyeo dolmyeo nieunja seo sonkal daebi makgi
20	Move the left foot to C, forming a left walking stance toward C, at the same time executing a low thrust to C with the right upset fingertip.	걷는서뒤집은손끝낮은데뚫기	geonneun seo dwijibeun sonkkeut najeunde ttulki
21	Execute a side back strike to D with the right back fist and a low block to C with the left forearm while forming right L-stance toward C, pulling the left foot.	ㄴ자서등주먹옆뒷때리기	nieunja seo deung jumeok yeop dwit ttaerigi
22	Move the right foot to C, forming a right walking stance toward C while executing a middle thrust to C with the right straight fingertip.	걷는서선손끝뚫기	geonneun seo seonsonkkeut ttulki
23	Move the left foot to B, turning counter-clockwise to form a left walking stance toward B while executing a high block to B with the left double forearm.	걷는서두팔목높은데막기	geonneun seo du palmok nopeunde makgi
24	Move the right foot to B, forming a sitting stance toward C while executing a middle front block to C with the right forearm, and then a high side strike to B with the right back fist.	앉는서바깥팔목앞막기, 앉는서등주먹높은데옆때리기	anneun seo bakkat palmok ap makgi, anneun seo deung jumeok nopeunde yeop ttaerigi
25	Execute a middle side piercing kick to A with the right foot, turning counter-clockwise and then lower it to A.	가운데옆차지르기	gaunde yeop cha jireugi
26	Execute a middle side piercing kick to A with the left foot turning clockwise.	가운데옆차지르기	gaunde yeop cha jireugi
27	Lower the left foot to A and then execute a checking block to B with an X-knifehand while forming a left L-stance toward B, pivoting with the left foot.	ㄴ자서교차손칼멈춰막기	nieunja seo gyocha sonkal meomchwo makgi
28	Move the left foot to B, forming a left walking stance toward B while executing an upward block to B with a twin palm.	걷는서두손바닥올려막기	geonneun seo du sonbadak ollyeo makgi
29	Move the left foot on line AB and then execute a rising block with the right forearm while forming a right walking stance toward A.	걷는서추켜막기	geonneun seo chukyeo makgi
30	Execute a middle punch to A with the left fist while maintaining a right walking stance toward A.	걷는서반대앞지르기	geonneun seo bandae ap jireugi
	Move the left foot to parallel ready stance A facing D.	나란히준비서기	narani junbi seogi

== Trivia ==
- Choong-Moo is one of the patterns that refers to the Joseon era, next to Yul-Gok, Toi-Gye, Choong-Jang, So-San, and Se-Jong.
- Yi was the inventor of the turtle ship, a Korean war ship with iron plates.
- The pattern ends with a left-hand attack to symbolize his tragic death, both because he passed away in the last battle of the Imjin War —a battle that would eventually still be won— and because he was not able to prove his disputed allegiance to King Seonjo of Joseon.
