= Won-Hyo (teul) =

Fourth ITF Taekwon-Do pattern

4. Won-Hyo
원효
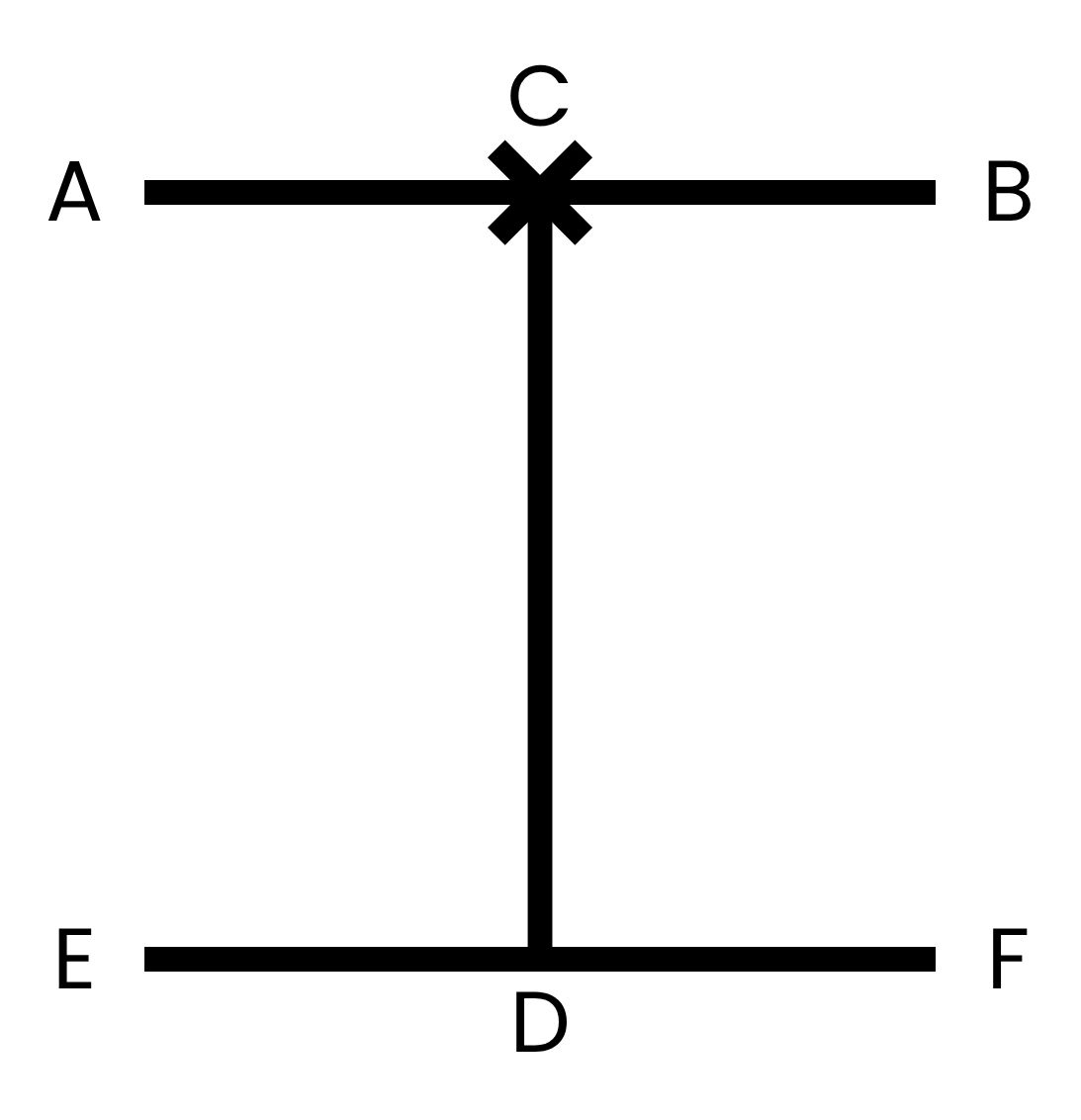
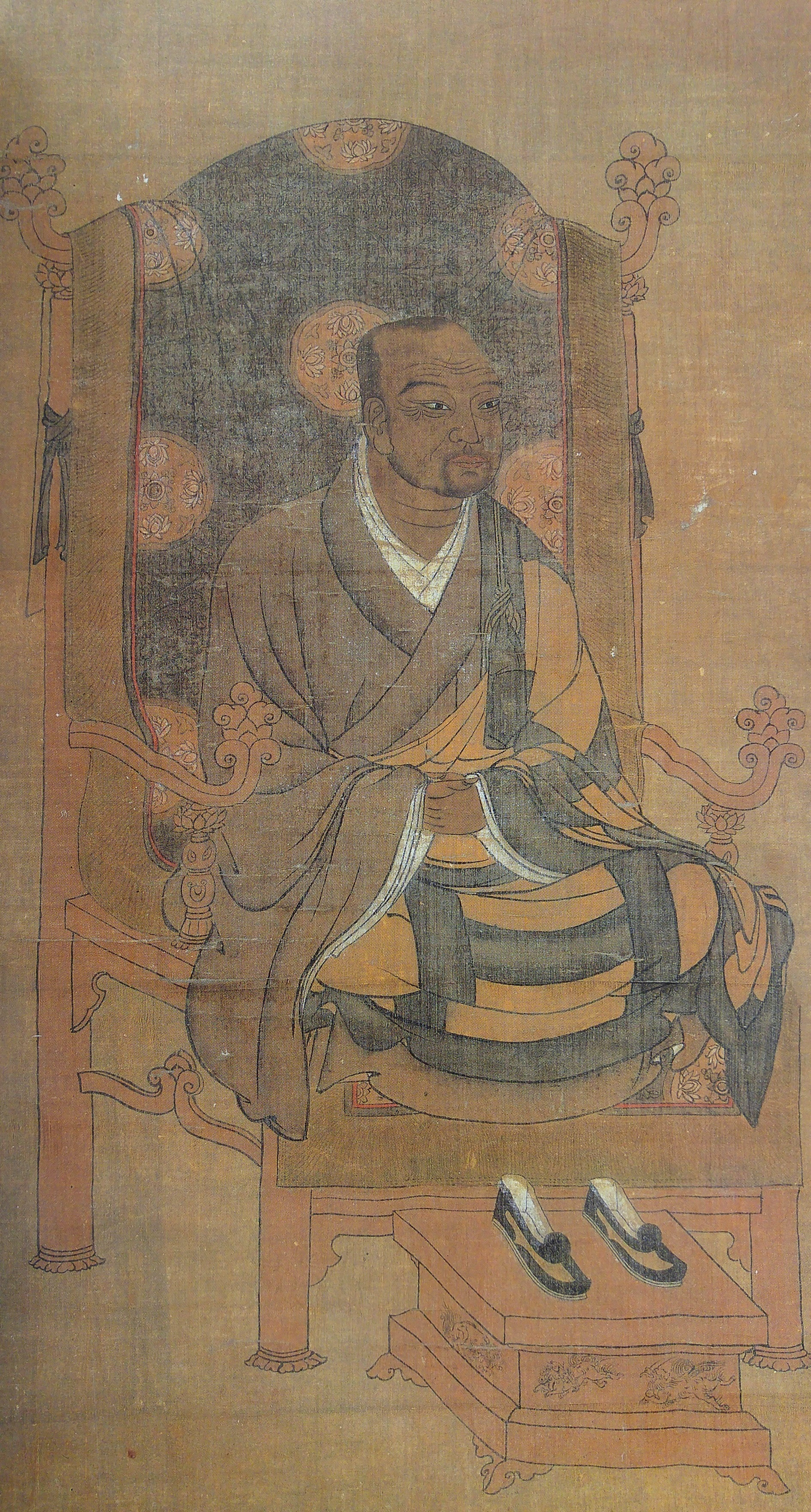
- Diagram of Won-Hyo Wonhyo
- Movements: 28
- Begin stance: Closed ready stance A
- Return foot: Right
- Meaning: Wonhyo
- Associated geup: 6th

Won-Hyo (Korean: 원효; RR: Wonhyo, Korean pronunciation: [wʌn.hjo]) is the fourth Taekwon-Do teul, as defined by the International Taekwon-Do Federation. The pattern consists of 28 movements and is taught to students with the 6th geup (green belt) and necessary to know to obtain the 5th geup (green-blue belt).

== Meaning ==
The name of the pattern refers to Wonhyo, a philosopher and monk who is considered the most influential figure in the development and spread of Korean Buddhism. He lived in the 7th century, wrote over 80 works, and has been widely cited by Chinese, Japanese, and Korean Buddhist scholars.

It is unclear why Won-Hyo has 28 movements.

== Movements ==
Nr.	English description	Korean description (in Hangul)	Korean description (in Revised Romanisation)
	Form a closed ready stance A facing D.	모아준비서기	moa junbi seogi
1	Step to B with the left foot, form a right L-stance, and execute a twin forearm block.	ㄴ자서쌍팔목막기	nieunja seo ssang palmok makgi
2	Maintain a right L-stance to B, execute a high inward strike to B with the right knife-hand, and simultaneously bring the left side fist in front of the right shoulder.	ㄴ자서손칼높은데안으로때리기	nieunja seo sonkal nopeunde aneuro ttaerigi
3	Slip the left foot toward B, form a left fixed stance toward B, and execute a middle punch to B with the left fist.	고정서바로앞지르기	gojeong seo baro ap jireugi
4	Step to A with the right foot, form a left L-stance, and execute a twin forearm block.	ㄴ자서쌍팔목막기	nieunja seo ssang palmok makgi
5	Maintain a left L-stance to A, execute a high inward strike to A with the left knife-hand, and simultaneously bring the right side fist in front of the left shoulder.	ㄴ자서손칼높은데안으로때리기	nieunja seo sonkal nopeunde aneuro ttaerigi
6	Slip the right foot toward A, form a right fixed stance toward A, and execute a middle punch to A with the right fist.	고정서바로앞지르기	gojeong seo baro ap jireugi
7	Step with the right foot right next to the left foot, then turn toward D, and form a right bending ready stance A toward D.	구부려준비서기	guburyeo junbi seogi
8	Execute a middle side piercing kick to D using the left foot.	가운데옆차지르기	gaunde yeop cha jireugi
9	Lower the left foot to D, form a right L-stance toward D, and execute a middle guarding block to D with a left knife-hand.	ㄴ자서손칼대비막기	nieunja seo sonkal daebi makgi
10	Execute a guarding block to D with a right knife-hand and form a left L-stance toward D by moving the right foot to D.	ㄴ자서손칼대비막기	nieunja seo sonkal daebi makgi
11	Execute a guarding block to D with a left knife-hand and form a right L-stance toward D by moving the left foot to D.	ㄴ자서손칼대비막기	nieunja seo sonkal daebi makgi
12	Execute a middle thrust to D with the right straight finger tip and form a right walking stance toward D by moving the right foot toward D.	걷는서선손끝뚫기	geonneun seo seonsonkkeut ttulki
13	Step to E with the left foot while turning counter-clockwise, form a right L-stance, and execute a twin forearm block.	ㄴ자서쌍팔목막기	nieunja seo ssang palmok makgi
14	Maintain a right L-stance to E, execute a high inward strike to E with the right knife-hand, and simultaneously bring the left side fist in front of the right shoulder.	ㄴ자서손칼높은데안으로때리기	nieunja seo sonkal nopeunde aneuro ttaerigi
15	Slip the left foot toward E, form a left fixed stance toward E, and execute a middle punch to E with the left fist.	고정서바로앞지르기	gojeong seo baro ap jireugi
16	Step to F with the right foot, form a left L-stance, and execute a twin forearm block.	ㄴ자서쌍팔목막기	nieunja seo ssang palmok makgi
17	Maintain a left L-stance to F, execute a high inward strike to F with the left knife-hand, and simultaneously bring the right side fist in front of the left shoulder.	ㄴ자서손칼높은데안으로때리기	nieunja seo sonkal nopeunde aneuro ttaerigi
18	Slip the right foot toward F, form a right fixed stance toward F, and execute a middle punch to F with the right fist.	고정서바로앞지르기	gojeong seo baro ap jireugi
19	Execute a right inner forearm circular block to CF, while bringing the right foot to the left foot and moving the left foot to C to form a left walking stance to C.	걷는서안팔목돌리며막기	geonneunseo an palmok dollimyeo makgi
20	Execute a right low front snap kick to C, while maintaining the position of the hands.	낮은데앞차부시기	najeunde ap cha busigi
21	Execute a middle reverse punch to C with the left fist, while lowering the right foot to C to form a right walking stance.	걷는서반대앞지르기	geonneun seo bandae ap jireugi
22	Maintain the right walking stance toward C, while executing a left inner forearm circular block to CE.	걷는서안팔목돌리며막기	geonneun seo an palmok dollimyeo makgi
23	Execute a left low front snap kick to C, while maintaining the position of the hands.	낮은데앞차부시기	najeunde ap cha busigi
24	Execute a middle reverse punch to C with the right fist, while lowering the left foot to C to form a left walking stance.	걷는서반대앞지르기	geonneun seo bandae ap jireugi
25	Turn the face to C and form a left bending ready stance A toward C.	구부려준비서기	guburyeo junbi seogi
26	Execute a middle side piercing kick to C using the right foot.	가운데옆차지르기	gaunde yeop cha jireugi
27	Lower the right foot on line CD, move the left foot to B while turning anti-clockwise to form a right L-stance toward B, and simultaneously execute a middle guarding block to B with the forearm.	ㄴ자서대비막기	nieunja seo daebi makgi
28	Bring the left foot to the right foot , move the right foot to A forming a left L-stance to A, and execute a middle guarding clock to A with the forearm.	ㄴ자서대비막기	nieunja seo daebi makgi
	Move the right foot to a closed ready stance A facing D.	모아준비서기	moa junbi seogi

== Trivia ==
- Won-Hyo is one of the patterns that refers to the era of unified Silla, as well as Hwa-Rang, Yoo-Sin, and Moon-Moo.
- The hand positioning in the ready stance of Won-Hyo represents the positioning of Wonhyo's hands over a stick, just like So-San.
- Before becoming a Buddhist, Won-Hyo was a Hwarang.
