= Yul-Gok (teul) =

Fifth ITF Taekwon-Do pattern

5. Yul-Gok
율곡
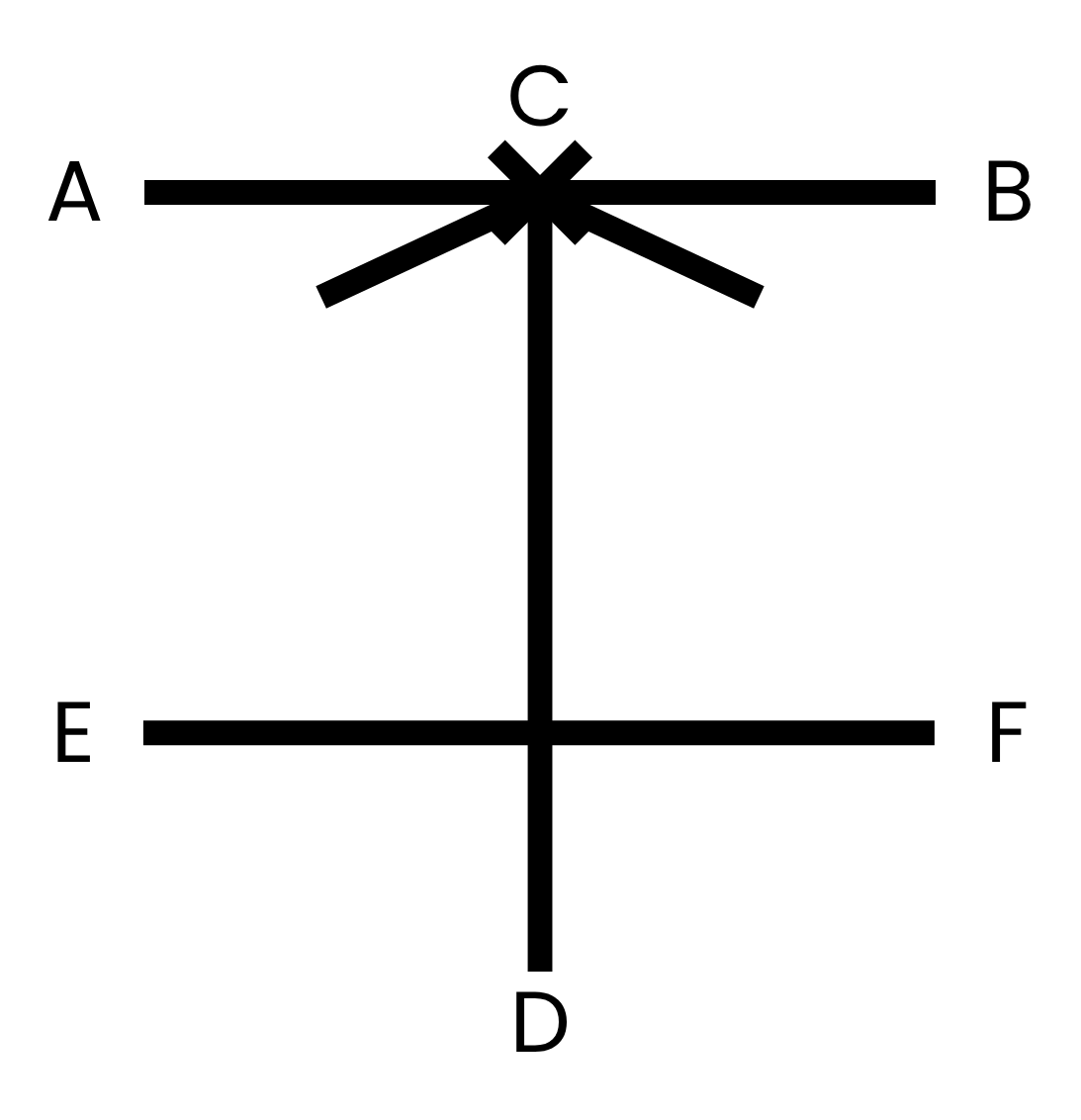
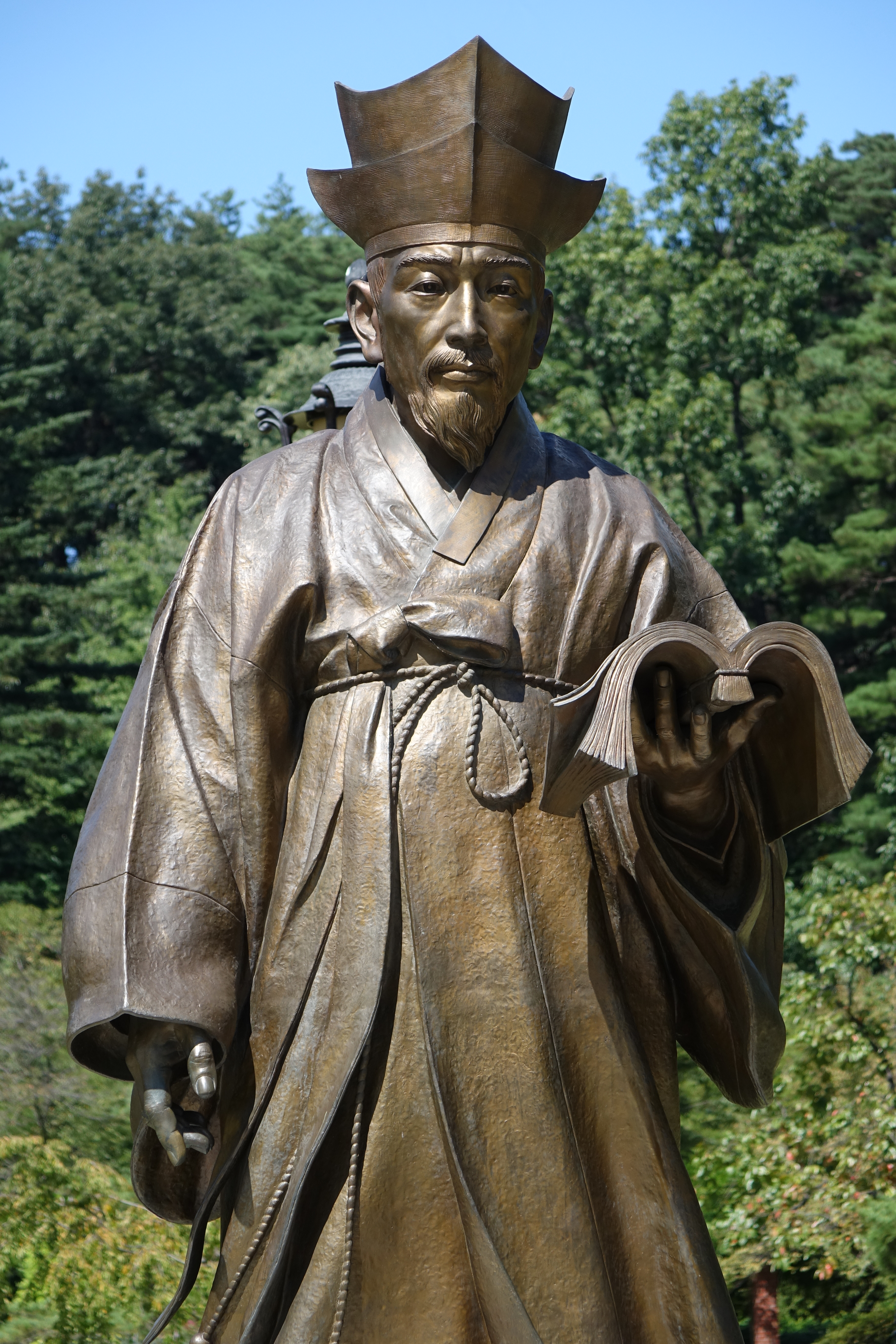
- Diagram of Yul-Gok Yi I
- Movements: 38
- Begin stance: Parallel ready stance A
- Return foot: Left
- Meaning: Yi I
- Associated geup: 5th

Yul-Gok (Korean: 율곡; RR: Yulgok, Korean pronunciation: [jul.kok]) is the fifth Taekwon-Do teul, as defined by the International Taekwon-Do Federation. The pattern consists of 38 movements and is taught to students with the 5th geup (green-blue belt) and necessary to know to obtain the 4th geup (blue belt).

== Meaning ==
The pattern is named after Yi I (pen name Yulgok), a Korean philosopher, writer, and Confucian scholar of the Joseon period. He is considered one of the most influential Neo-Confucianists. Moreover, he was involved in politics and held various ministerial positions under King Seonjo of Joseon.

=== Number of movements ===
The pattern has 38 movements because Yi I was born in Gangneung, a city located near the 38° latitude.

== Movements ==
Nr.	English description	Korean description (in Hangul)	Korean description (in Revised Romanisation)
	Parallel ready stance A facing D	나란히준비서기	narani junbi seogi
1	Move the left foot to B, forming a sitting stance toward D while extending the left fist to D horizontally.	앉는서기	anneun seogi
2	Execute a middle punch to D with the right fist while maintaining a sitting stance toward D.	앉는서앞지르기	anneun seo ap jireugi
3	Execute a middle punch to D with the left fist while maintaining a sitting stance toward D. Perform 2 and 3 in a fast motion.	앉는서앞지르기, 빠른동작	anneun seo ap jireugi, ppareun dongjak
4	Bring the left foot to the right foot, and then move the right foot to A, forming a sitting stance toward D while extending the right fist to D horizontally.	앉는서기	anneun seogi
5	Execute a middle punch to D with the left fist while maintaining a sitting stance toward D.	앉는서앞지르기	anneun seo ap jireugi
6	Execute a middle punch to D with the right fist while maintaining a sitting stance toward D.	앉는서앞지르기, 빠른동작	anneun seo ap jireugi, ppareun dongjak
7	Move the right foot to AD, forming a right walking stance toward AD while executing a middle side block to AD with the right inner forearm.	걷는서안팔목가운데옆막기	geonneun seo an palmok gaunde yeop makgi
8	Execute a low front snap kick to AD with the left foot, keeping the position of the hands as they were in 7.	낮은데앞차부시기	najeunde ap cha busigi
9	Lower the left foot to AD, forming a left walking stance toward AD while executing a middle punch to AD with the left fist.	걷는서앞지르기	geonneun seo ap jireugi
10	Execute a middle punch to AD with the right fist while maintaining a left walking stance toward AD. Perform 9 and 10 in fast motion.	걷는서반대앞지르기, 빠른동작	geonneun seo bandae ap jireugi, ppareun dongjak
11	Move the left foot to BD, forming a left walking stance to BD, executing a middle side block to BD with the left inner forearm.	걷는서안팔목가운데옆막기	geonneun seo an palmok gaunde yeop makgi
12	Execute a low front snap kick to BD with the right foot, keeping the position of the hands as they were in 11.	낮은데앞차부시기	najeunde ap cha busigi
13	Lower the right foot to BD, forming a right walking stance toward BD, while executing a middle punch to BD with the right fist.	걷는서앞지르기	geonneun seo ap jireugi
14	Execute a middle punch to BD with the left fist while maintaining a right walking stance toward BD. Perform 13 and 14 in a fast motion.	걷는서반대앞지르기, 빠른동작	geonneun seo bandae ap jireugi, ppareun dongjak
15	Execute a middle hooking block to D with the right palm while forming a right walking stance toward D, pivoting with the left foot.	걷는서손바닥가운데걸쳐막기	geonneun seo sonbadak gaunde geolchyeo makgi
16	Execute a middle hooking block to D with the left palm while maintaining a right walking stance toward D.	걷는서손바닥가운데반대걸쳐막기	geonneun seo sonbadak gaunde bandae geolchyeo makgi
17	Execute a middle punch to D with the right fist while maintaining a right walking stance toward D. Perform 16 and 17 in a connecting motion.	걷는서앞지르기, 이어진동작	geonneun seo ap jireugi, ieojin dongjak
18	Move the left foot to D, forming a left walking stance toward D while executing a middle hooking block to D with the left palm.	걷는서손바닥가운데걸쳐막기	geonneun seo sonbadak gaunde geolchyeo makgi
19	Execute a middle hooking block to D with the right palm while maintaining a left walking stance toward D.	걷는서손바닥가운데반대걸쳐막기	geonneun seo sonbadak gaunde bandae geolchyeo makgi
20	Execute a middle punch to D with the left fist while maintaining a left walking stance toward D. Perform 19 and 20 in a connecting motion.	걷는서앞지르기, 이어진동작	geonneun seo ap jireugi, ieojin dongjak
21	Move the right foot to D, forming a right walking stance toward D, at the same time executing a middle punch to D with the right fist.	걷는서앞지르기	geonneun seo ap jireugi
22	Turn the face toward D, forming a right bending ready stance A toward D.	구부려준비서기	guburyeo junbi seogi
23	Execute a middle side piercing kick toward D with the left foot.	가운데옆차지르기	gaunde yeop cha jireugi
24	Lower the left foot to D, forming a left walking stance toward D while striking the left palm with the right front elbow.	걷는서앞팔굽때리기	geonneun seo ap palgup ttaerigi
25	Turn and face toward C while forming a left bending ready stance A toward C.	구부려준비서기	guburyeo junbi seogi
26	Execute a middle side piercing kick toward to C with the right foot.	가운데옆차지르기	gaunde yeop cha jireugi
27	Lower the right foot to C, forming a right walking stance toward C while striking the right palm with the left front elbow.	걷는서앞팔굽때리기	geonneun seo ap palgup ttaerigi
28	Move the left foot to E, forming a right L-stance toward E while executing a twin knifehand block.	ㄴ자서쌍손칼막기	nieunja seo ssang sonkal makgi
29	Move the right foot to E, forming a right walking stance toward E while executing a middle thrust to E with the right straight fingertip.	걷는서선손끝뚫기	geonneun seo seonsonkkeut ttulki
30	Move the right foot to F, turning clockwise to form a left L-stance toward F while executing a twin knifehand block.	ㄴ자서쌍손칼막기	nieunja seo ssang sonkal makgi
31	Move the left foot to F, forming a left walking stance toward F while executing a middle thrust to F with the left straight fingertip.	걷는서선손끝뚫기	geonneun seo seonsonkkeut ttulki
32	Move the left foot to C, forming a left walking stance toward C while executing a high side block to C with the left outer forearm.	걷는서바깥팔목높은데옆막기	geonneun seo bakkat palmok nopeunde yeop makgi
33	Execute a middle punch to C with the right fist while maintaining a left walking stance toward C.	걷는서반대앞지르기	geonneun seo bandae ap jireugi
34	Move the right foot to C, forming a right walking stance toward C while executing a high side block to C with the right outer forearm.	걷는서바깥팔목높은데옆막기	geonneun seo bakkat palmok nopeunde yeop makgi
35	Execute a middle punch to C with the left fist while maintaining a right walking stance toward C.	걷는서반대앞지르기	geonneun seo bandae ap jireugi
36	Jump to C, forming a left X-stance toward B while executing a high side strike to C with the left back fist.	뛰며겨차서등주먹높은데옆때리기	ttwimyeo gyeocha seo deung jumeok nopeunde yeop ttaerigi
37	Move the right foot to A, forming a right walking stance toward A, at the same time executing a high block toward A with the right double forearm.	걷는서두팔목높은데막기	geonneun seo du palmok nopeunde makgi
38	Bring the right foot to the left foot, and then move the left foot to B, forming a left walking stance toward B while executing a high block to B with the left double forearm.	걷는서두팔목높은데막기	geonneun seo du palmok nopeunde makgi
	Move the left foot to parallel ready stance A facing D.	나란히준비서기	narani junbi seogi

== Trivia ==
- The diagram of Yul-Gok (工) has the same shape as the Hanja character for "scholar", in reference to Yi I.
- Yul-Gok is one of the teul named after a person who lived during the Joseon period, next to Toi-Gye, Choong-Moo, Choong-Jang, So-San, and Se-Jong. Yi I personally knew and worked together with Yi Hwang (pen name Toegye).
