= Toi-Gye (teul) =

Seventh ITF Taekwon-Do pattern

7. Toi-Gye
퇴계
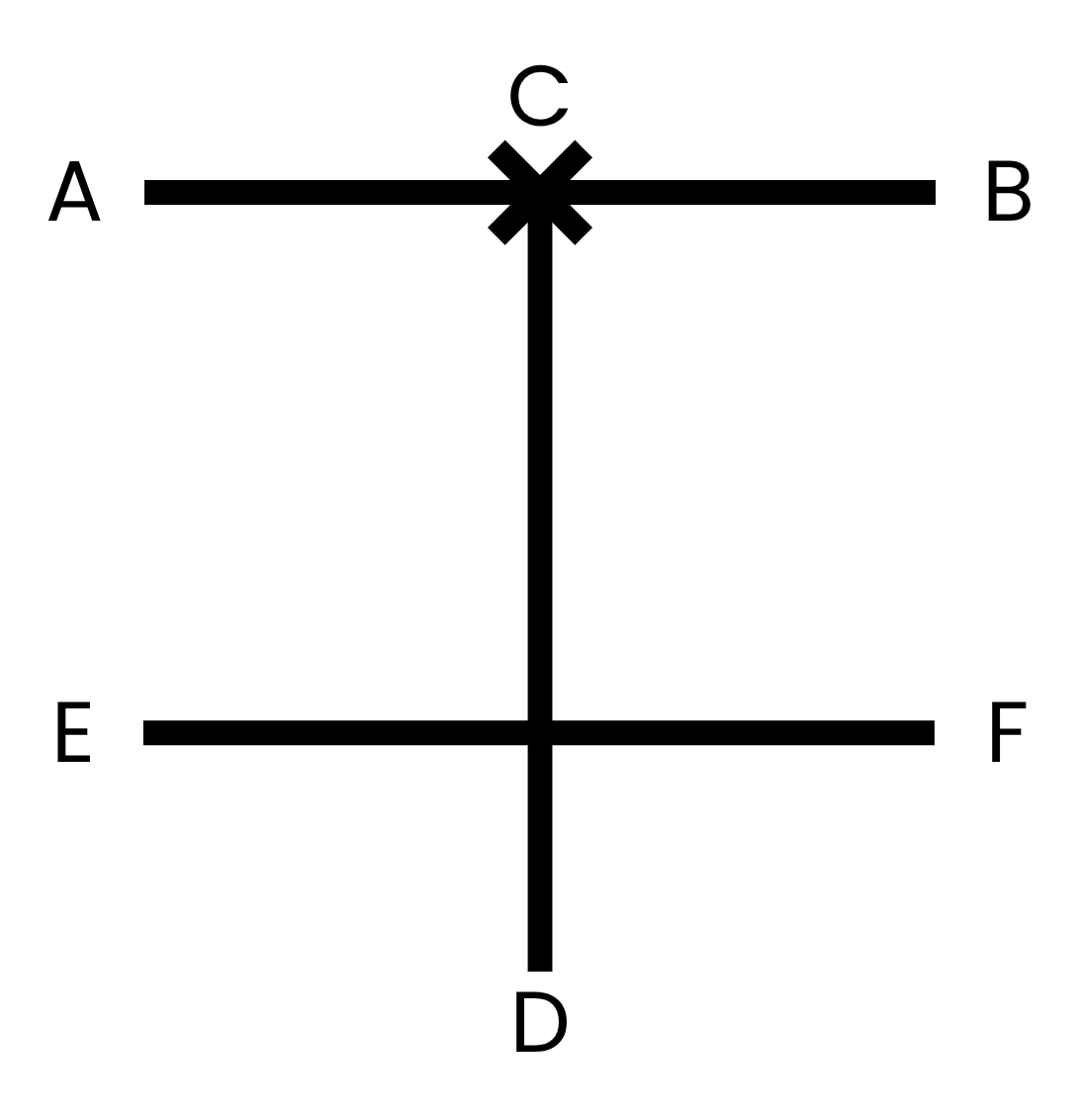
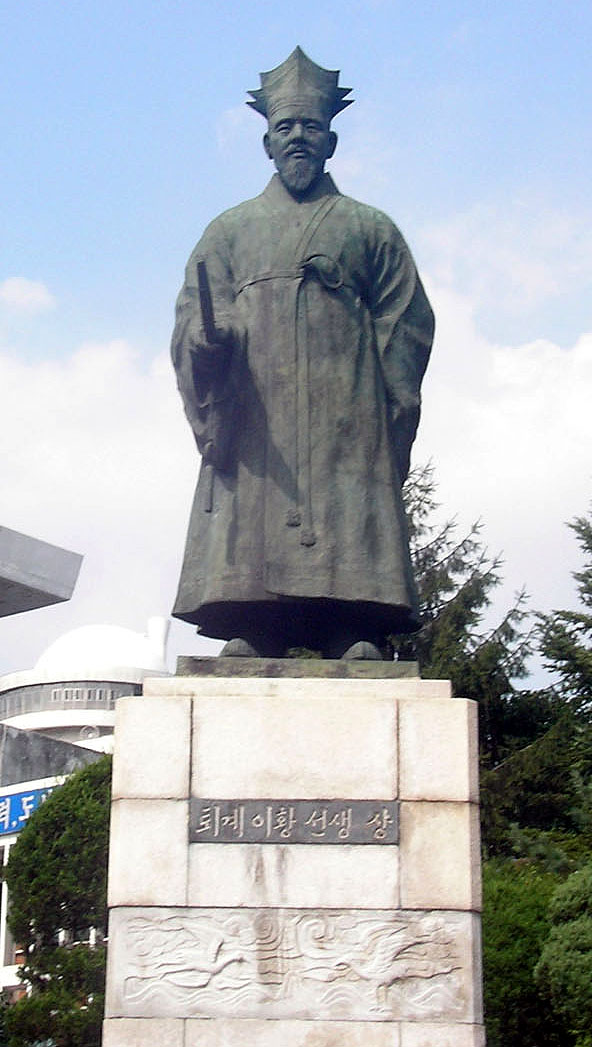
- Diagram of Toi-Gye Yi Hwang
- Movements: 37
- Begin stance: Closed ready stance B
- Return foot: Right
- Meaning: Yi Hwang
- Associated geup: 3rd

Toi-Gye (Korean: 퇴계; RR: Toegye, Korean pronunciation: [tʰwe.ke]) is the seventh Taekwon-Do teul, as defined by the International Taekwon-Do Federation. The pattern consists of 37 movements and is taught to students with the 3rd geup (blue-red belt) and necessary to know to obtain the 2nd geup (red belt).

== Meaning ==
The pattern is named after Yi Hwang (pen name Toegye), a Neo-Confucianist from the Joseon period widely regarded as one of the most influential philosophers in Korean history. Yi established two schools in Korea and published many works, several of which were studied and taught in Japan, Taiwan, and Vietnam.

=== Number of movements ===
The number of movements of Toi-Gye refer to the birthplace of Yi-Hwang, Ongye-ri (Andong), located near the 37th latitude. Moreover, Yi Hwang was a prominent government figure for the last 37 years of his life.

== Movements ==
Nr.	English description	Korean description (in Hangul)	Korean description (in Revised Romanisation)
	Closed ready stance B facing D	모아준비서기	moa junbi seogi
1	Move the left foot to B, forming a right L-stance toward B while executing a middle block to B with the left inner forearm.	ㄴ자서안팔목가운데옆막기	nieunja seo an palmok gaunde yeop makgi
2	Execute a low thrust to B with the right upset fingertip while forming a left walking stance toward B, slipping the left foot.	걷는서뒤집은손끝낮은데뚫기	geonneun seo dwijibeun sonkkeut najeunde ttulki
3	Bring the left foot to the right foot to form a close stance toward D while executing a side back strike to C with the right back fist, extending the left arm to the side downward. Perform in slow motion.	모아서등주먹옆뒷때리기, 느린동작	moa seo deung jumeok yeop dwit ttaerigi, neurin dongjak
4	Move the right foot to A, forming a left L-stance toward A while executing a middle block to A with the right inner forearm.	ㄴ자서안팔목가운데옆막기	nieunja seo an palmok gaunde yeop makgi
5	Execute a low thrust to A with the left upset fingertip while forming a right walking stance toward A, slipping the right foot to A.	걷는서뒤집은손끝낮은데뚫기	geonneun seo dwijibeun sonkkeut najeunde ttulki
6	Bring the right foot to the left foot to form a close stance toward D while executing a side back strike to C with the left back fist, extending the right arm to the side-downward. Perform in slow motion.	모아서등주먹옆뒷때리기, 느린동작	moa seo deung jumeok yeop dwit ttaerigi, neurin dongjak
7	Move the left foot to D, forming a left walking stance toward D while executing a pressing block with an X-fist.	걷는서교차주먹눌러막기	geonneun seo gyocha jumeok nulleo makgi
8	Execute a high vertical punch to D with a twin fist while maintaining a left walking stance toward D. Perform 7 and 8 in continuous motion.	걷는서쌍주먹높은데세워지르기, 계속동작	geonneun seo ssang jumeok nopeunde sewo jireugi, gyesok dongjak
9	Execute a middle front snap kick to D with the right foot, keeping the position of the hands as they were in 8.	가운데앞차부시기	gaunde ap cha busigi
10	Lower the right foot to D, forming a right walking stance toward D while executing a middle punch to D with the right fist.	걷는서앞지르기	geonneun seo ap jireugi
11	Execute a middle punch to D with the left fist while maintaining a right walking stance toward D.	걷는서반대앞지르기	geonneun seo bandae ap jireugi
12	Bring the left foot to the right foot, forming a close stance toward F while executing a twin side elbow thrust. Perform in slow motion.	모아서쌍옆팔굽뚫기, 느린동작	moa seo ssang yeop palgup ttulki, neurin dongjak
13	Move the right foot to F in a stamping motion, forming a sitting stance toward C while executing a W-shape block to C with the right outer forearm.	앉는서바깥팔목산막기	anneun seo bakkat palmok san makgi
14	Move the left foot to F in a stamping motion, turning clockwise to form a sitting stance toward D while executing a W-shape block to D with the left outer forearm.	앉는서바깥팔목산막기	anneun seo bakkat palmok san makgi
15	Move the left foot to E in a stamping motion, turning clockwise to form a sitting stance toward C, at the same time executing a Wshape block to C with the left outer forearm.	앉는서바깥팔목산막기	anneun seo bakkat palmok san makgi
16	Move the right foot to E in a stamping motion, turning counterclockwise to form a sitting stance toward D while executing a Wshape block to D with the right outer forearm.	앉는서바깥팔목산막기	anneun seo bakkat palmok san makgi
17	Move the left foot to E in a stamping motion, turning clockwise to form a sitting stance toward C, at the same time executing a Wshape block to C with the left outer forearm.	앉는서바깥팔목산막기	anneun seo bakkat palmok san makgi
18	Move the left foot to F in a stamping motion, turning clockwise to form a sitting stance toward D while executing a W-shape block to D with the left outer forearm.	앉는서바깥팔목산막기	anneun seo bakkat palmok san makgi
19	Bring the right foot to the left foot and then move the left foot to D, forming a right L-stance toward D while executing a low pushing block to D with the left double forearm.	ㄴ자서두팔목낮은데밀어막기	nieunja seo du palmok najeunde mireo makgi
20	Extend both hands upward as if to grab the opponent's head while forming a left walking stance toward D, slipping the left foot to D.	걷는준비서기	geonneun junbi seogi
21	Execute an upward kick with the right knee while pulling both hands downward.	무릎올려차기	mureu pollyeo chagi
22	Lower the right foot to the left foot and then move the left foot to C, forming a right L-stance toward C while executing a middle guarding block to C with a knife-hand.	ㄴ자서손칼대비막기	nieunja seo sonkal daebi makgi
23	Execute a low side front snap kick to C with the left foot, keeping the position of the hands as they were in 22.	낮은데옆앞차부시기	najeunde yeop ap cha busigi
24	Lower the left foot to C, forming a left walking stance toward C while executing a high thrust to C with the left flat fingertip.	걷는서엎은손끝높은데뚫기	geonneun seo eopeun sonkkeut nopeunde ttulki
25	Move the right foot to C, forming a left L-stance toward C while executing a middle guarding block to C with a knife-hand.	ㄴ자서손칼대비막기	nieunja seo sonkal daebi makgi
26	Execute a low side front snap kick to C with the right foot, keeping the position of the hands as they were in 25.	낮은데옆앞차부시기	najeunde yeop ap cha busigi
27	Lower the right foot to C, forming a right walking stance toward C, at the same time executing a high thrust to C with the right flat fingertip.	걷는서엎은손끝높은데뚫기	geonneun seo eopeun sonkkeut nopeunde ttulki
28	Move the right foot to D, forming a right L-stance toward C while executing a side back strike to D with the right back fist and a low block to C with the left forearm.	ㄴ자서등주먹옆뒷때리기	nieunja seo deung jumeok yeop dwit ttaerigi
29	Jump to C, forming a right X-stance toward A while executing a pressing block with an X-fist.	뛰며겨차서교차주먹눌러막기	ttwimyeo gyeocha seo gyocha jumeok nulleo makgi
30	Move the right foot to C, forming a right walking stance toward C while executing a high block to C with the right double forearm.	걷는서두팔목높은데막기	geonneun seo du palmok nopeunde makgi
31	Move the left foot to B, forming a right L-stance toward B while executing a low guarding block to B with a knife-hand.	ㄴ자서손칼낮은데대비막기	nieunja seo sonkal najeunde daebi makgi
32	Execute a circular block to BD with the right inner forearm while forming a left walking stance toward B, slipping the left foot to B.	걷는서안팔목돌리며막기	geonneun seo an palmok dollimyeo makgi
33	Bring the left foot to the right foot and then move the right foot to A, forming a left L-stance toward A, at the same time executing a low guarding block to A with a knife-hand.	ㄴ자서손칼낮은데대비막기	nieunja seo sonkal najeunde daebi makgi
34	Execute a circular block to AD with the left inner forearm while forming a right walking stance toward A, slipping the right foot to A.	걷는서안팔목돌리며막기	geonneun seo an palmok dollimyeo makgi
35	Execute a circular block to CE with the right inner forearm while forming a left walking stance toward CE.	걷는서안팔목돌리며막기	geonneun seo an palmok dollimyeo makgi
36	Execute a circular block to CE with the left inner forearm while forming a right walking stance toward A.	걷는서안팔목돌리며막기	geonneun seo an palmok dollimyeo makgi
37	Move the right foot on line AB to form a sitting stance toward D while executing a middle punch to D with the right fist.	앉는서앞지르기	anneun seo ap jireugi
	Move the right foot to the closed ready stance B facing D.	모아준비서기	moa junbi seogi

== Trivia ==
- Toi-Gye is one of the teul named after someone who lived during the Joseon period, next to Yul-Gok, Choong-Moo, Choong-Jang, So-San, and Se-Jong. Yi Hwang personally knew and worked together with Yi I (pen name Yulgok).
