= Sekong =

Sekong may refer to:

- Sekong River, river in mainland Southeast Asia
- Sekong province, province of Laos
- Sekong (city), the capital city of Sekong province
- Sekong Bridge, bridge spanning the Sekong River
- Sekong (state constituency), state constituency in Sabah, Malaysia

== See also ==
- Sejong (disambiguation)
