= Sejong (disambiguation) =

Sejong most commonly refers to:

- Sejong the Great, the fourth king of Joseon
- Sejong City, a planned city in South Korea

Sejong may also refer to:

== Places ==
- Sejongno, street that runs through Jongno-gu in downtown Seoul

== Ships ==
- ROKS Sejong the Great (launched 2007)
- Sejong the Great-class destroyer

== Film & television ==
- King Sejong the Great (1964 film)
- King Sejong the Great (1973 TV series)
- King Sejong the Great (1978 film)
- The Great King, Sejong, 2008 South Korean television series

== Other uses ==
- 7365 Sejong, main-belt asteroid
- King Sejong Institute, cultural institution
- King Sejong Station, research station for the Korea Antarctic Research Program
- Korea University Sejong Campus, Korea University 's second campus
- Sejong Center, largest arts and cultural complex in Seoul
- Sejong Institute, foreign & security think tank
- Sejong University, private university located in Seoul
- Sejong (constituency), constituency of the National Assembly of South Korea
- Se-Jong (teul), twenty-third ITF Taekwon-Do pattern

== See also ==
- Oh Se-jong (1982–2016), South Korean short track speed skater
- Cho Se-jong (born 1978), South Korean sport shooter
- Byun Se-jong (born 1998), South Korean figure skater
- Sekong
