= So-San (teul) =

Twenty-second ITF Taekwon-Do pattern

22. So-San
서산
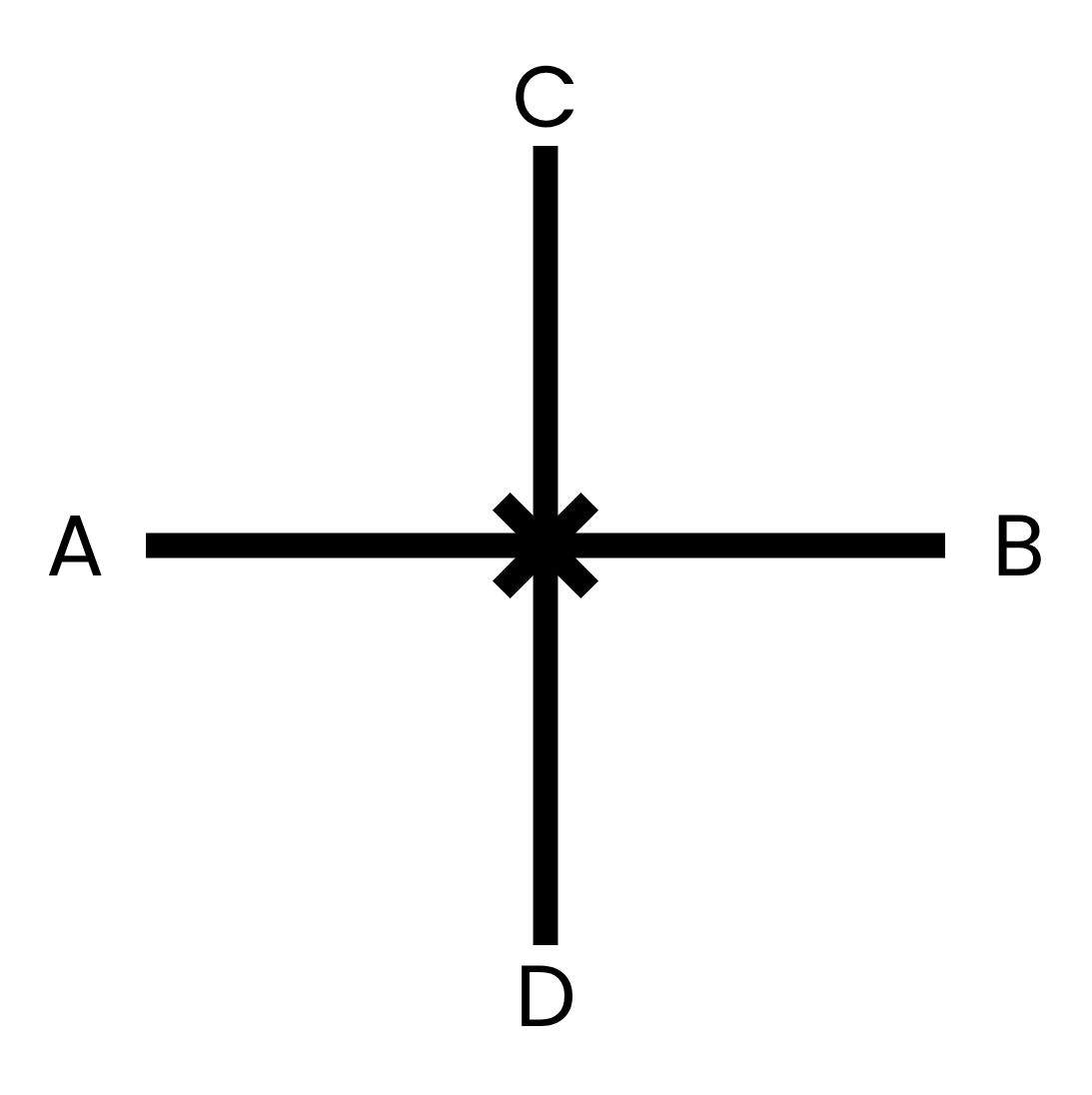
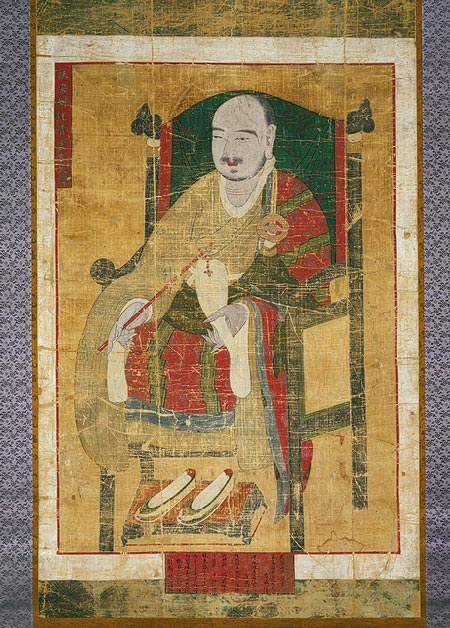
- Diagram of So-San Hyujeong
- Movements: 72
- Begin stance: Closed ready stance A
- Return foot: Right
- Meaning: Hyujeong
- Associated dan: 5th

So-San (Korean: 서산; RR: Seosan, Korean pronunciation: [sʌ.san]) is the twenty-second Taekwon-Do teul, as defined by the International Taekwon-Do Federation. The pattern consists of 72 movements and is taught to students with the 5th dan (black belt) and necessary to know to obtain the 6th dan.

== Meaning ==
The pattern is named after Hyujeong (pen name Seosan), a 16th-century Korean Seon master and author. Hyujeong is best known for recruiting and commanding a guerilla army consisting of 5,000 monks during the Imjin War. His most famous Buddhist work is Seongagwigam, a guide to Seon practice studied by Korean monks even today.

=== Number of movements ===
The 72 movements of the pattern refer to the age at which Hyujeong recruited the monk warriors.

== Movements ==
Nr.	English description	Korean description (in Hangul)	Korean description (in Revised Romanisation)
	Closed ready stance A facing D	모아준비서기	moa junbi seogi
1	Slide to C to form a right rear foot stance toward D while executing a middle guarding block to D with the forearm.	미끌며뒷발서대비막기	mikkeulmyeo dwitbal seo daebi makgi
2	Execute a middle vertical punch to D with the right fist while forming a left walking stance toward D, slipping the left foot.	걷는서가운데반대세워지르기	geonneun seo gaunde bandae sewo jireugi
3	Slide to C to form a left rear foot stance toward D while executing a middle guarding block to D with the forearm.	미끌며뒷발서대비막기	mikkeulmyeo dwitbal seo daebi makgi
4	Execute a middle vertical punch to D with the left fist while forming a right walking stance toward D, slipping the right foot.	걷는서가운데반대세워지르기	geonneun seo gaunde bandae sewo jireugi
5	Execute a high side block to BC with the right knife-hand while forming a left walking stance toward BC.	걷는서손칼높은데반대옆막기	geonneun seo sonkal nopeunde bandae yeop makgi
6	Execute a middle punch to BD with the left fist while forming a sitting stance toward BD. Perform 5 and 6 in a fast motion.	앉는서앞지르기, 빠른동작	anneun seo ap jireugi, ppareun dongjak
7	Execute a high side block to BD with the left knife-hand while forming a right walking stance toward BD.	걷는서손칼높은데반대옆막기	geonneun seo sonkal nopeunde bandae yeop makgi
8	Execute a middle punch to BD with the right fist while forming a sitting stance toward BD. Perform 7 and 8 in a fast motion.	앉는서앞지르기, 빠른동작	anneun seo ap jireugi, ppareun dongjak
9	Move the right foot to C turning clockwise to form a parallel stance toward A while executing a horizontal strike with a twin knife-hand.	나란히서쌍손칼수평때리기	narani seo ssang sonkal supyeong ttaerigi
10	Execute a high side piercing kick to C with the right foot keeping the position of the hands as they were in 9.	높운데옆차지르기	nopunde yeop cha jireugi
11	Execute a high turning kick to D with the right foot. Perform 10 and 11 in a continuous kick.	높은데돌려차기, 차례차례동작	nopeunde dollyeo chagi, charye charye dongjak
12	Lower the right foot to D in a jumping motion to form a right X-stance toward BD while executing a high side strike to D with the right back fist and bringing the left finger belly to the right side fist.	뛰며겨차서등주먹높은데옆때리기	ttwimyeo gyeocha seo deung jumeok nopeunde yeop ttaerigi
13	Move the left foot to C forming a parallel stance toward B while executing a horizontal strike with a twin knife-hand.	나란히서쌍손칼수평때리기	narani seo ssang sonkal supyeong ttaerigi
14	Execute a high side piercing kick to C with the left foot keeping the position of the hands as they were in 13.	높운데옆차지르기	nopunde yeop cha jireugi
15	Execute a high turning kick to D with the left foot. Perform 14 and 15 in a continuous kick.	높은데돌려차기, 차례차례동작	nopeunde dollyeo chagi, charye charye dongjak
16	Lower the left foot to D in a jumping motion to form a left X-stance toward AD while executing a high side strike to D with the left back fist and bringing the right finger belly to the left side fist.	뛰며겨차서등주먹높은데옆때리기	ttwimyeo gyeocha seo deung jumeok nopeunde yeop ttaerigi
17	Move the left foot to A forming a right L-stance toward A executing a low punch to A with a left double fist.	ㄴ자서두주먹낮은데지르기	nieunja seo du jumeok najeunde jireugi
18	Bring the right palm on the left fore fist and then twist them counter clockwise until the left back fist faces downward while forming a left walking stance toward A, slipping the left foot. Perform in a releasing motion.	호신술	hosin sul
19	Execute a high punch to A with the right fist while maintaining a left walking stance toward A.	걷는서높은데반대앞지르기	geonneun seo nopeunde bandae ap jireugi
20	Move the left foot on line AB to form a left L-stance toward B while executing a low punch to B with a right double fist.	ㄴ자서두주먹낮은데지르기	nieunja seo du jumeok najeunde jireugi
21	Bring the left palm on the right fore fist and then twist them clockwise until the right back fist faces downward while forming a right walking stance toward B, slipping the right foot. Perform in a releasing motion.	호신술	hosin sul
22	Execute a high punch to B with the left fist while maintaining a right walking stance toward B.	걷는서높은데반대앞지르기	geonneun seo nopeunde bandae ap jireugi
23	Slide to B to form a right L-stance toward B while executing an upset punch to B with the right middle knuckle fist and bringing the left side fist in front of the right shoulder.	미끌며ㄴ자서중지주먹뒤집어지르기	mikkeulmyeo nieunja seo jungji jumeok dwijibeo jireugi
24	Execute a front strike to B with the right back fist while forming a left walking stance toward B, slipping the right foot.	걷는서등주먹반대앞때리기	geonneun seo deung jumeok bandae ap ttaerigi
25	Slide to A, turning clockwise to form a left L-stance toward A while executing an upset punch to A with the left middle knuckle fist and bringing the right side fist in front of the left shoulder.	미끌며ㄴ자서중지주먹뒤집어지르기	mikkeulmyeo nieunja seo jungji jumeok dwijibeo jireugi
26	Execute a front strike to A with the left back fist while forming a right walking stance toward A, slipping the left foot.	걷는서등주먹반대앞때리기	geonneun seo deung jumeok bandae ap ttaerigi
27	Move the left foot to D forming a right walking ready stance toward C.	걷는준비서기	geonneun junbi seogi
28	Jump to execute a flying front snap kick to C with the right foot.	뛰며앞차부시기	ttwimyeo ap cha busigi
29	Land to C forming a left L-stance toward C while executing a middle guarding block to C with a knife-hand.	ㄴ자서손칼대비막기	nieunja seo sonkal daebi makgi
30	Move the right foot to D to form a left walking stance toward C while executing a high front block with the right forearm.	걷는서바깥팔목높은데반대앞막기	geonneun seo bakkat palmok nopeunde bandae ap makgi
31	Execute a middle punch to C with the left fist while shifting to C, maintaining a left walking stance toward C.	잦은발, 걷는서앞지르기	jajeunbal, geonneun seo ap jireugi
32	Turn clockwise, pivoting with the left foot to form a right walking stance toward D while executing a high front block with the left forearm.	걷는서바깥팔목높은데반대앞막기	geonneun seo bakkat palmok nopeunde bandae ap makgi
33	Execute a middle punch to D with the right fist while shifting to D, maintaining a right walking stance toward D.	잦은발, 걷는서앞지르기	jajeunbal, geonneun seo ap jireugi
34	Execute a middle block to BC with a double arc-hand while forming a left walking stance toward BC and looking through the hands.	걷는서두반달손가운데막기	geonneun seo du bandalson gaunde makgi
35	Execute a high inward strike to BC with the right knife-hand and bringing the left side fist in front of the right shoulder while maintaining a left walking stance toward BC.	걷는서손칼높은데안으로때리기	geonneun seo sonkal nopeunde aneuro ttaerigi
36	Execute a circular block to BD with the left inner forearm while forming a right walking stance toward D.	걷는서안팔목돌리며막기	geonneun seo an palmok dollimyeo makgi
37	Execute a high punch to D with the right fist while maintaining a right walking stance toward D.	걷는서높은데앞지르기	geonneun seo nopeunde ap jireugi
38	Execute a low front snap kick to D with the left foot keeping the position of the hands as they were in 37.	낮은데앞차부시기	najeunde ap cha busigi
39	Lower the left foot to D forming a left walking stance toward D while executing amiddle punch to D with the left fist.	걷는서앞지르기	geonneun seo ap jireugi
40	Execute a middle punch to D with the right fist while maintaining a left walking stance toward D. Perform 39 and 40 in a fast motion.	걷는서반대앞지르기, 빠른동작	geonneun seo bandae ap jireugi, ppareun dongjak
41	Execute a rising block with an X-knife-hand while maintaining a left walking stance toward D.	걷는서교차손칼추켜막기	geonneun seo gyocha sonkal chukyeo makgi
42	Execute a middle block to AC with a double arc-hand while forming a right walking stance toward AC and looking through the hands.	걷는서두반달손가운데막기	geonneun seo du bandalson gaunde makgi
43	Execute a high inward strike to AC with the left knife-hand and bringing the right side fist in front of the left shoulder while maintaining a right walking stance toward AC.	걷는서손칼높은데안으로때리기	geonneun seo sonkal nopeunde aneuro ttaerigi
44	Execute a circular block to AD with the right inner forearm while forming a left walking stance toward D.	걷는서안팔목돌리며막기	geonneun seo an palmok dollimyeo makgi
45	Execute a high punch to D with the left fist while maintaining a left walking stance toward D.	걷는서높은데앞지르기	geonneun seo nopeunde ap jireugi
46	Execute a low front snap kick to D with the right foot keeping the position of the hands as they were in 45.	낮은데앞차부시기	najeunde ap cha busigi
47	Lower the right foot to D forming a right walking stance toward D while executing a middle punch to D with the right fist.	걷는서앞지르기	geonneun seo ap jireugi
48	Execute a middle punch to D with the left fist while maintaining a right walking stance toward D. Perform 47 and 48 in a fast motion.	걷는서반대앞지르기, 빠른동작	geonneun seo bandae ap jireugi, ppareun dongjak
49	Execute a rising block with an X-knife-hand while maintaining a right walking stance toward D.	걷는서교차손칼추켜막기	geonneun seo gyocha sonkal chukyeo makgi
50	Move the left foot to D, and then slide to D, turning counter-clockwise to form a right L-stance toward C while executing a low guarding block to C with a knife-hand.	미끌며ㄴ자서손칼낮은데대비막기	mikkeulmyeo nieunja seo sonkal najeunde daebi makgi
51	Jump to C, spinning counter-clockwise to form a right L-stance toward D while executing a middle guarding block to D with the forearm.	뛰며ㄴ자서대비막기	ttwimyeo nieunja seo daebi makgi
52	Execute a low block to D with the right knife-hand and a middle outward block to D with the left inner forearm while forming a left walking stance toward D, slipping the left foot.	걷는서손칼낮은데반대막기안팔목가운데밖으로막기	geonneun seo sonkal najeunde bandae makgi an palmok gaunde bakkeuro makgi
53	Execute a high punch to D with the right fist while maintaining a left walking stance toward D. Perform 52 and 53 in a continuous motion.	걷는서높은데반대앞지르기, 계속동작	geonneun seo nopeunde bandae ap jireugi, gyesok dongjak
54	Execute a middle punch to D with the left fist while forming a right L-stance toward D, pulling the left foot.	ㄴ자서반대지르기	nieunja seo bandae jireugi
55	Move the right foot to D, and then slide to D, turning clockwise to form a left L-stance toward C while executing a low guarding block to C with a knife-hand.	미끌며ㄴ자서손칼낮은데대비막기	mikkeulmyeo nieunja seo sonkal najeunde daebi makgi
56	Jump to C, spinning clockwise to form a left L-stance toward D while executing a middle guarding block to D with the forearm.	뛰며ㄴ자서대비막기	ttwimyeo nieunja seo daebi makgi
57	Execute a low block to D with the left knife-hand and a middle outward block to D with the right inner forearm while forming a right walking stance toward D slipping the right foot.	걷는서손칼낮은데반대막기안팔목가운데밖으로막기	geonneun seo sonkal najeunde bandae makgi an palmok gaunde bakkeuro makgi
58	Execute a high punch to D with the left fist while maintaining a right walking stance toward D. Perform 57 and 58 in a continuous motion.	걷는서높은데반대앞지르기, 계속동작	geonneun seo nopeunde bandae ap jireugi, gyesok dongjak
59	Execute a middle punch to D with the right fist while forming a left L-stance toward D, pulling the right foot.	ㄴ자서반대지르기	nieunja seo bandae jireugi
60	Move the right foot to the side rear of the left foot, and then slide to C, forming a left L-stance toward D at the same time executing a scooping block with the right palm.	옮겨디디며미끌며어오기ㄴ자서손바닥반대들어막기	olgyeo didimyeo mikkeulmyeogi nieunja seo sonbadak bandae deureo makgi
61	Shift to D, maintaining a left L-stance toward D while executing a middle punch to D with the left fist.	잦은발, ㄴ자서바로앞지르기	jajeunbal, nieunja seo baro ap jireugi
62	Turn clockwise while forming a left bending ready stance A toward C.	구부려준비서기	guburyeo junbi seogi
63	Execute a high side piercing kick to C with the right foot, keeping the position of the hands as they were in 62.	높운데옆차지르기	nopunde yeop cha jireugi
64	Lower the right foot to C, forming a right walking stance toward C while executing a middle punch to C with the left fist.	걷는서반대앞지르기	geonneun seo bandae ap jireugi
65	Move the right foot to D, forming a right L-stance toward C while executing a middle guarding block to C with a knife-hand.	ㄴ자서손칼대비막기	nieunja seo sonkal daebi makgi
66	Move the left foot to the side rear of the right foot, and then slide to D, forming a right L-stance toward C while executing a scooping block with the left palm.	옮겨디디며미끌며어오기ㄴ자서손바닥반대들어막기	olgyeo didimyeo mikkeulmyeogi nieunja seo sonbadak bandae deureo makgi
67	Shift to C, maintaining a right L-stance toward C while executing a middle punch to C with the right fist.	잦은발, ㄴ자서바로앞지르기	jajeunbal, nieunja seo baro ap jireugi
68	Turn counter-clockwise while forming a right bending ready stance A toward C.	구부려준비서기	guburyeo junbi seogi
69	Execute a high side piercing kick to D with the left foot, keeping the position of the hands as they were in 68.	높운데옆차지르기	nopunde yeop cha jireugi
70	Lower the left foot to D to form a left walking stance toward D at the same time executing a middle punch to D with the right fist.	걷는서반대앞지르기	geonneun seo bandae ap jireugi
71	Move the left foot to C to form a left L-stance toward D while executing a middle guarding block to D with a knife-hand.	ㄴ자서손칼대비막기	nieunja seo sonkal daebi makgi
72	Execute a high punch to D with the right fist while forming a right walking stance toward D, slipping the right foot. Perform 71 and 72 in a continuous motion.	걷는서높은데앞지르기, 계속동작	geonneun seo nopeunde ap jireugi, gyesok dongjak
	Move the right foot to the closed ready stance A facing D.	모아준비서기	moa junbi seogi

== Trivia ==
- So-San is one of the patterns that refers to the Joseon era, next to Yul-Gok, Toi-Gye, Choong-Moo, Choong-Jang, and Se-Jong.
- The hand positioning in the ready stance of So-San represents the positioning of Hyujeong's hands over a stick, just like in Won-Hyo.
- With 72 movements, So-San is the longest teul in Taekwon-Do.
