= Choong-Jang (teul) =

Fourteenth ITF Taekwon-Do pattern

14. Choong-Jang
충장
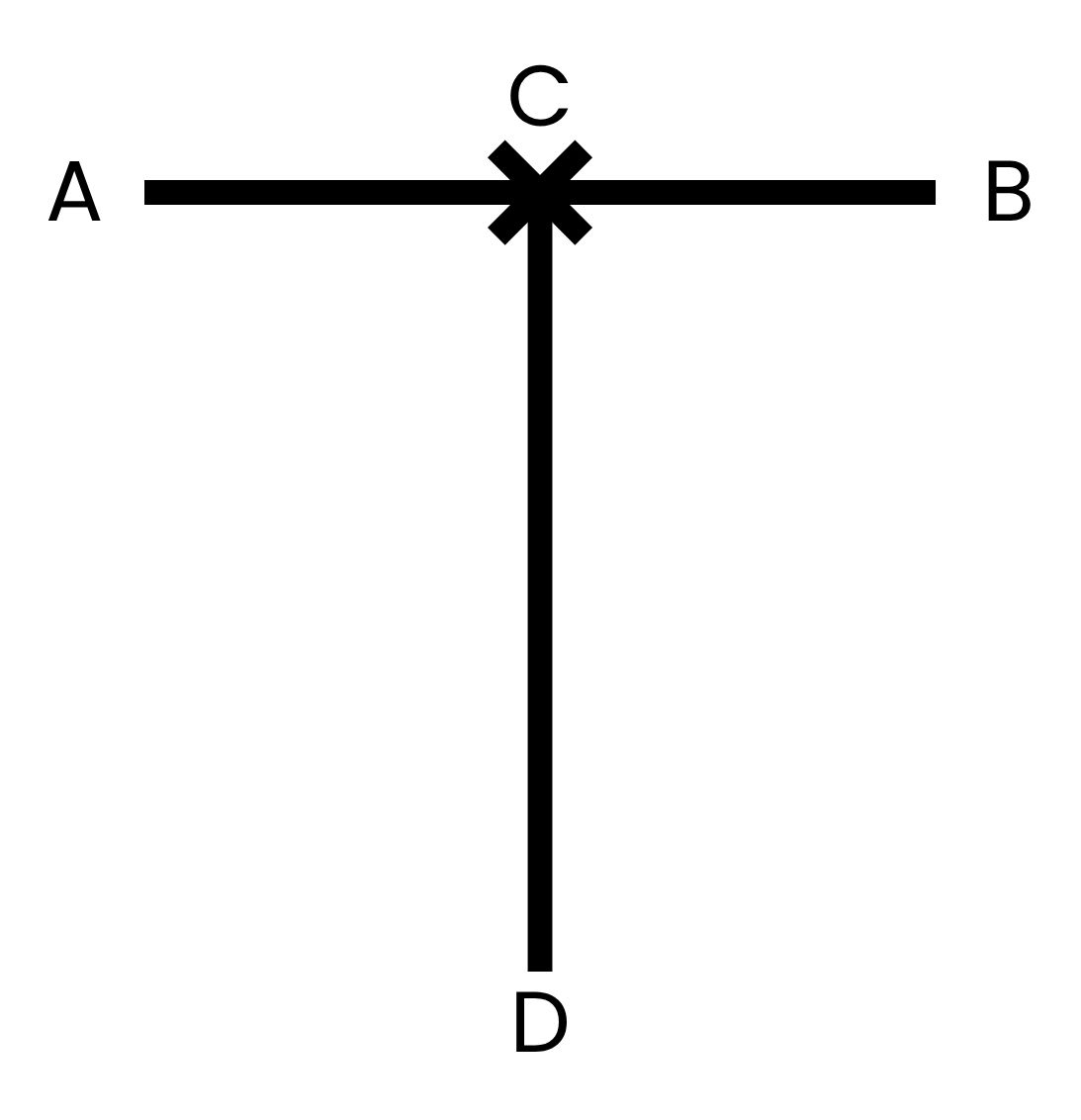
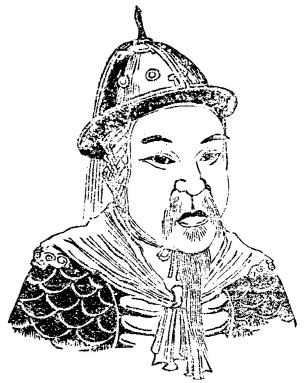
- Diagram of Choong-Jang Kim Deokryeong
- Movements: 52
- Begin stance: Closed ready stance A
- Return foot: Left
- Meaning: Kim Deokryeong
- Associated dan: 2nd

Choong-Jang (Korean: 충장; RR: Chungjang, Korean pronunciation: [tɕʰuŋ.tɕaŋ]) is the fourteenth Taekwon-Do teul, as defined by the International Taekwon-Do Federation. The pattern consists of 52 movements and is taught to students with the 2nd dan (black belt) and necessary to know to obtain the 3rd dan.

== Meaning ==
Choong-Jang is named after Kim Deokryeong (posthumous name Chungjang), a Joseon general during the Imjin War. Having been born into a peasant family, Kim climbed his way up in the military ranks until becoming a general. He was executed by King Seonjo of Joseon after being falsely accused of collaborating with a rebellion to overthrow the king. He received various posthumous titles in recognition of his loyalty to the king and bravery in battle.

It is unclear why this pattern has 52 movements.

== Movements ==
Nr.	English description	Korean description (in Hangul)	Korean description (in Revised Romanisation)
	Form a closed ready stance A facing D.	모아준비서기	moa junbi seogi
1	Move the right foot to A, forming a sitting stance toward D, while executing a side front block with the right inner forearm and extending the left forearm side-downward.	앉는서안팔목옆앞막기	anneun seo an palmok yeop ap makgi
2	Maintain a sitting stance toward D, execute a side front block with the left inner forearm , and extend the right forearm side downward.	앉는서안팔목옆앞막기	anneun seo an palmok yeop ap makgi
3	Move the right foot to the left foot forming a closed stance toward D and execute an angle punch with the left fist. Perform in slow motion.	모아서앞주먹ㄱ자지르기, 느린동작	moa seo ap jumeok nieunja jireugi, neurin dongjak
4	Step the left foot to D to form a left walking stance toward and execute a high thrust to D with the right double finger.	걷는서두손가락높은데반대뚫기	geonneun seo du songarak nopeunde bandae ttulki
5	Step the right foot to D to form a right walking stance toward and execute a high thrust to D with the left double finger.	걷는서두손가락높은데반대뚫기	geonneun seo du songarak nopeunde bandae ttulki
6	Maintain a right walking stance toward D, while executing a front strike to D with the right back fist.	걷는서등주먹앞때리기	geonneun seo deung jumeok ap ttaerigi
7	Step the left foot to D forming a left walking stance toward D and execute a rising block with the left forearm.	걷는서추켜막기	geonneun seo chukyeo makgi
8	Step the right foot to D to form a right walking stance toward D and simultaneously execute a middle punch to D with the right fist.	걷는서앞지르기	geonneun seo ap jireugi
9	Step the right foot to C turning counter-clockwise, slide to C to form a right L-stance toward D, and execute a middle guarding block to D with the forearm.	뒤로옮겨디디며미끌며돌기ㄴ자서대비막기	dwiro olgyeo didimyeo mikkeulmyeo dolgi nieunja seo daebi makgi
10	Execute a low front snap kick to D with the right foot keeping the position of the hands as they were in 9.	낮은데앞차부시기	najeunde ap cha busigi
11	Lower the right foot to D forming a right low stance toward D and execute a high thrust to D with the right flat finger tip.	낮춰서엎은손끝높은데뚫기	natchwo seo eopeun sonkkeut nopeunde ttulki
12	Execute a high turning kick to D with the right foot supporting the body with both hands and the left knee.	몸낮추며높은데돌려차기	mom natchumyeo nopeunde dollyeo chagi
13	Lower the right foot to D, execute a high punch to D with the right fist, and press the ground with the left palm.	몸낮추며높은데앞지르기	mom natchumyeo nopeunde ap jireugi
14	Step the left foot to D turning clockwise to form a left L-stance toward C and thrust to D with the left side elbow.	ㄴ자서때팔굽뚫기	nieunja seo ttae palgup ttulki
15	Step the left foot to C turning clockwise to form a left L-stance toward D and simultaneously execute a middle guarding block to D with the forearm.	ㄴ자서대비막기	nieunja seo daebi makgi
16	Step the right foot to C forming a right L-stance toward D and execute a scooping block with the left palm.	ㄴ자서손바닥반대들어막기	nieunja seo sonbadak bandae deureo makgi
17	Step the left foot to C forming a left L-stance toward D and execute a middle outward strike to D with the right knife-hand.	ㄴ자서손칼옆때리기	nieunja seo sonkal yeop ttaerigi
18	Form a left walking stance toward C, pivoting with the right foot, and execute a pressing block with an X-fist.	걷는서교차주먹눌러막기	geonneun seo gyocha jumeok nulleo makgi
19	Execute a low front snap kick to C with the right knee and simultaneously pull both hands in the opposite direction as if to grab the opponent’s leg.	무릎낮은데앞차부시기	mureup najeunde apcha busigi
20	Lower the right foot to C, forming a right L-stance toward D, and execute a middle guarding block to D with a knife-hand.	ㄴ자서손칼대비막기	nieunja seo sonkal daebi makgi
21	Move the right foot to D in a sliding motion to form a right L-stance toward C while thrusting to D with the right side elbow.	미끌며ㄴ자서때팔굽뚫기	mikkeulmyeo nieunja seo ttae palgup ttulki
22	Form a left L-stance toward D pivoting with the left foot and execute a middle guarding block to D with a knife-hand.	ㄴ자서손칼대비막기	nieunja seo sonkal daebi makgi
23	Execute a right middle side piercing kick to D and simultaneously pull both hands in the opposite direction.	가운데옆차지르기	gaunde yeop cha jireugi
24	Lower the right foot to D, execute a pressing block with a twin palm, and form a right rear foot stance toward C, pivoting with the right foot.	뒷발서쌍손바닥눌러막기	dwitbal seo ssang sonbadak nulleo makgi
25	Step the right foot to C to form a right walking stance toward C, execute a high front block to C with the right outer forearm, and execute a high side strike to C with the right back fist, while maintaining a right walking stance toward C.	걷는서바깥팔목높은데앞막기, 걷는서등주먹높은데옆때리기	geonneun seo bakkat palmok nopeunde ap makgi, geonneun seo deung jumeok nopeunde yeop ttaerigi
26	Form a right L-stance toward D pivoting with the right foot and execute a high thrust to D with the left flat finger tip.	ㄴ자서엎은손끝높은데반대뚫기	nieunja seo eopeun sonkkeut nopeunde bandae ttulki
27	Execute a right low front snap kick to D and bring the right palm on the left back hand.	낮은데앞차부시기	najeunde ap cha busigi
28	Lower the right foot to D to form a left walking stance toward C by pivoting with the left foot, and thrust to D with the right back elbow, while placing the left side fist on the right fist. Perform in slow motion.	걷는서뒷팔굽반대뚫기, 느린동작	geonneun seo dwit palgup bandae ttulki, neurin dongjak
29	Form a right L-stance toward C, pivoting with the right foot, and execute a downward strike with the left back hand. Perform in stamping motion.	구르며ㄴ자서손등반대내려때리기	gureumyeo nieunja seo son deung bandae naeryeo ttaerigi
30	Punch the left palm with the right fist and maintain a right L-stance toward C.	ㄴ자서바로앞지르기	nieunja seo baro ap jireugi
31	Step the right foot to C in a stamping motion to form a left L-stance toward C and execute a downward strike with the right back hand.	구르며ㄴ자서손등반대내려때리기	gureumyeo nieunja seo son deung bandae naeryeo ttaerigi
32	Punch the right palm with the left fist while maintaining a left L-stance toward C.	ㄴ자서바로앞지르기	nieunja seo baro ap jireugi
33	Execute a middle outward strike to D with the left knife-hand and form a right L-stance toward D by pivoting with the right foot. Perform in a stamping motion.	구르며ㄴ자서손칼옆때리기	gureumyeo nieunja seo sonkal yeop ttaerigi
34	Execute a high side front strike to D with the right back fist by striking the left palm with the right elbow, and form a left walking stance toward D by slipping the left foot.	걷는서등주먹높은데반대옆앞때리기	geonneun seo deung jumeok nopeunde bandae yeop ap ttaerigi
35	Move the right foot to D forming a left L-stance toward D and execute a middle outward strike to D with the right knife-hand. Perform in stamping motion.	구르며ㄴ자서손칼옆때리기	gureumyeo nieunja seo sonkal yeop ttaerigi
36	Execute a high side front strike to D with the left back fist by striking the right palm with the left elbow, and form a right walking stance toward D by slipping the right foot.	걷는서등주먹높은데반대옆앞때리기	geonneun seo deung jumeok nopeunde bandae yeop ap ttaerigi
37	Execute a low guarding block to C with a reverse knife-hand and form a right L-stance toward C by pivoting with the right foot.	ㄴ자서손칼등낮은데대비막기	nieunja seo sonkal deung najeunde daebi makgi
38	Execute a right 9-shape block and form a left walking stance toward C by slipping the left foot.	걷는서반대구자막기	geonneun seo bandae guja makgi
39	Move the right foot to C forming a left L-stance toward C and execute a low guarding block to C with a reverse knife-hand.	ㄴ자서손칼등낮은데대비막기	nieunja seo sonkal deung najeunde daebi makgi
40	Execute a left 9-shape block and form a right walking stance toward C by slipping the right foot.	걷는서반대구자막기	geonneun seo bandae guja makgi
41	Step the right foot to D to form a left walking stance toward C and execute a horizontal strike with a twin knife-hand.	걷는서쌍손칼수평때리기	geonneun seo ssang sonkal supyeong ttaerigi
42	Execute a high strike to C with the right arc-hand and maintain a left walking stance toward C.	걷는서반달손높은데반대앞때리기	geonneun seo bandal son nopeunde bandae ap ttaerigi
43	Execute a right middle front snap kick to C, while keeping the position of the hands as they were in 42.	가운데앞차부시기	gaunde ap cha busigi
44	Lower the right foot to C to form a right walking stance toward C and execute a high strike to C with the left arc-hand.	걷는서반달손높은데반대앞때리기	geonneun seo bandal son nopeunde bandae ap ttaerigi
45	Execute a left middle front snap kick to C, while keeping the position of the hands as they were in 44.	가운데앞차부시기	gaunde ap cha busigi
46	Lower the left foot to C forming a left walking stance toward C and execute a middle punch to C with the right fist.	걷는서반대앞지르기	geonneun seo bandae ap jireugi
47	Execute a middle punch to C with the left fist and maintain a left walking stance toward C. Perform 46 and 47 in a fast motion.	걷는서앞지르기, 빠른동작	geonneun seo ap jireugi, ppareun dongjak
48	Bring the right foot to the left foot to form a close stance toward C and execute a high crescent punch with a twin for-knuckle fist.	모아서쌍인지주먹높은데반대지르기	moa seo ssang inji jumeok nopeunde bandae jireugi
49	Step the left foot to B turning counter-clockwise, forming a left walking stance toward B and execute a low block to B with the left knife-hand.	걷는서손칼낮은데막기	geonneun seo sonkal najeunde makgi
50	Execute a high punch to B with the right open fist and maintain a left walking stance toward B.	걷는서편주먹높은데반대지르기	geonneun seo pyeon jumeok nopeunde bandae jireugi
51	Step the left foot on line AB to form a right walking stance toward A and execute a low block to A with the right knife-hand.	걷는서손칼낮은데막기	geonneun seo sonkal najeunde makgi
52	Execute a high punch to A with the left open fist and maintain a right walking stance toward A.	걷는서편주먹높은데반대지르기	geonneun seo pyeon jumeok nopeunde bandae jireugi
	Move the left foot to a closed ready stance A facing D.	모아준비서기	moa junbi seogi

== Trivia ==
- Choong-Jang is one of the patterns that refers to the Joseon era, next to Yul-Gok, Toi-Gye, Choong-Moo, So-San, and Se-Jong.
- The pattern ends with a left-hand attack to symbolize Kim's tragic death in prison after being falsely accused of having joined a rebellion.
