= Se-Jong (teul) =

Twenty-third ITF Taekwon-Do pattern

23. Se-Jong
세종
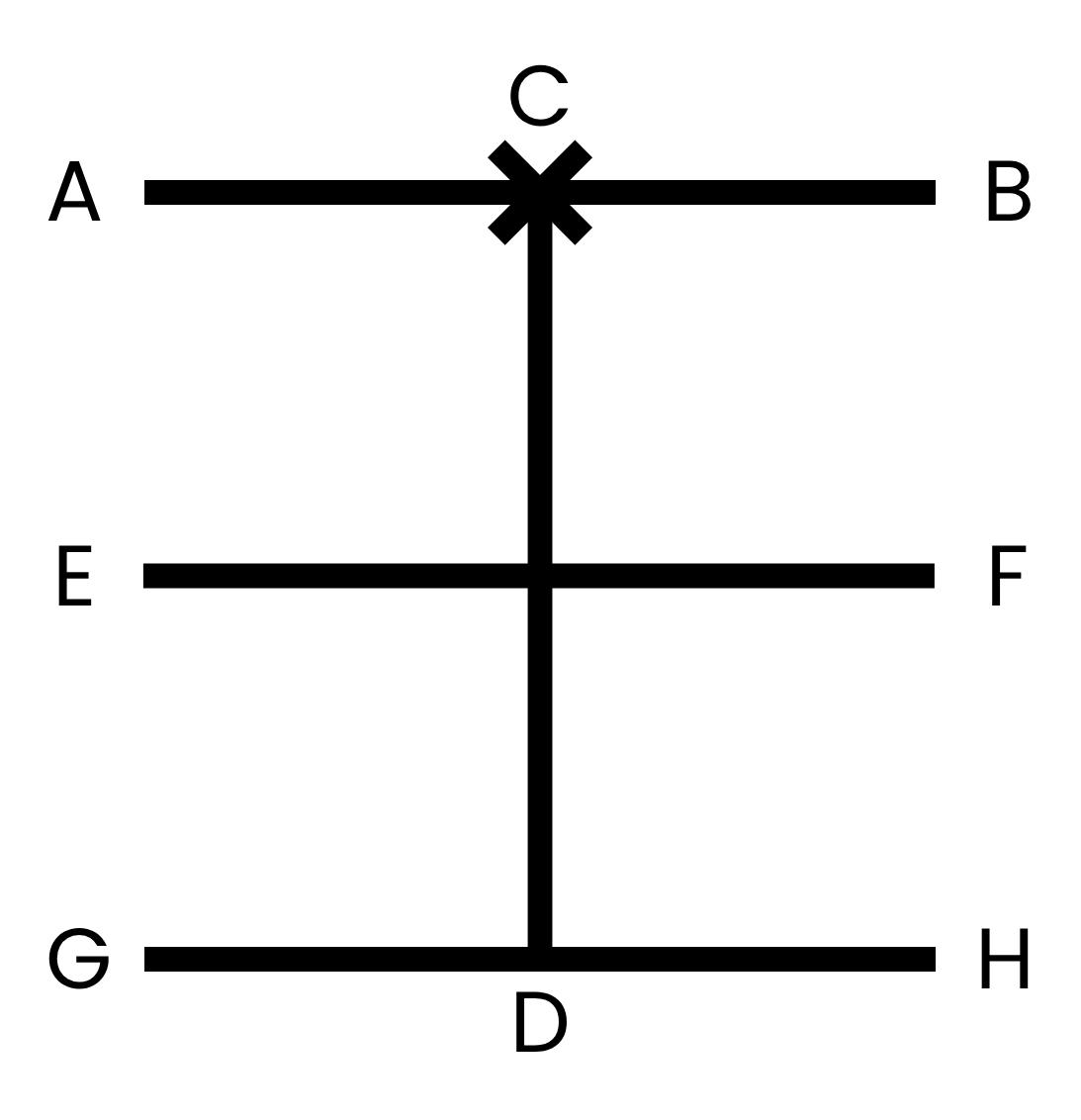
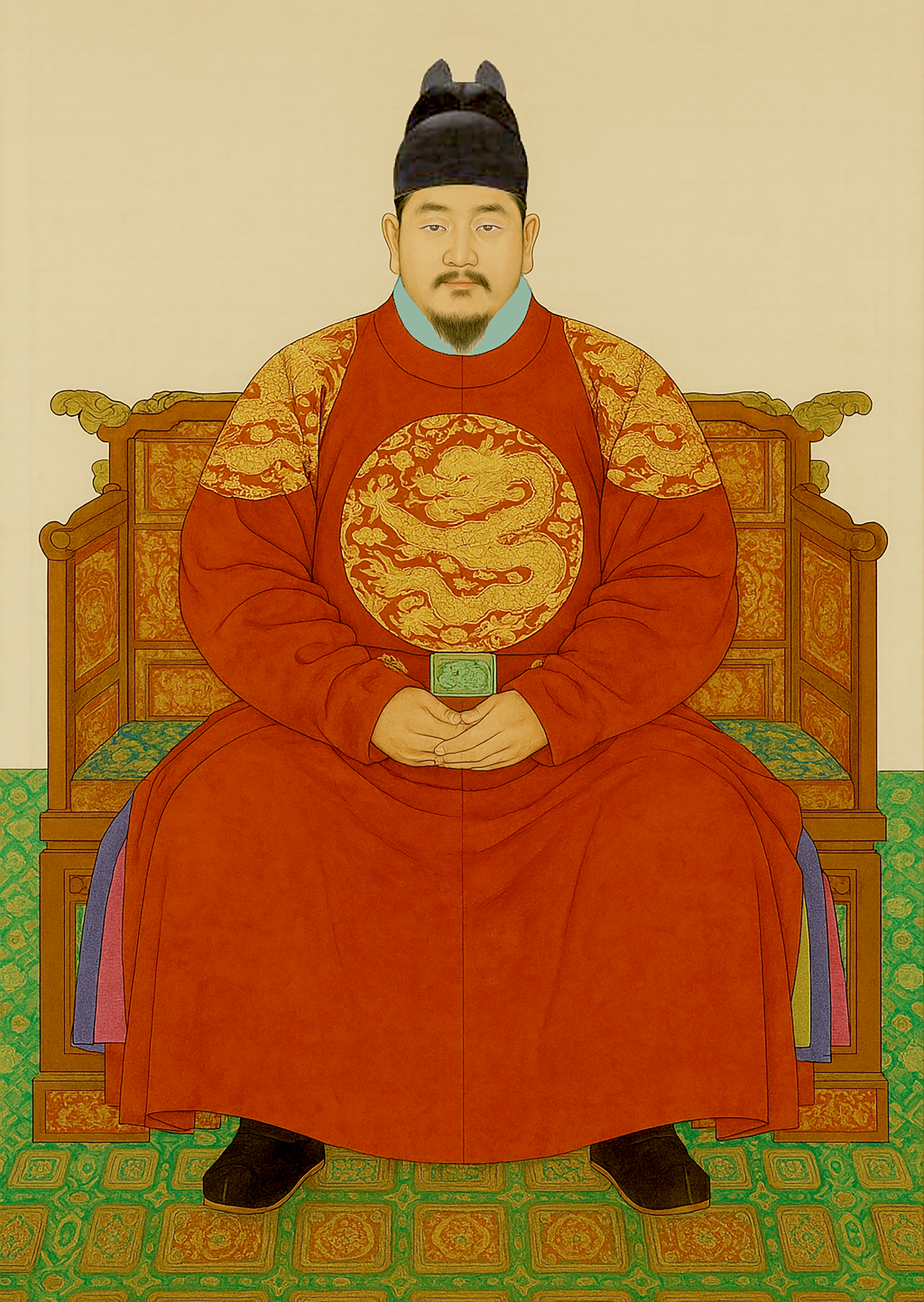
- Diagram of Se-Jong Sejong the Great
- Movements: 24
- Begin stance: Closed ready stance B
- Return foot: Left
- Meaning: Sejong the Great
- Associated dan: 5th

Se-Jong (Korean: 세종; RR: Sejong, Korean pronunciation: [se.tɕoŋ]) is the twenty-third Taekwon-Do teul, as defined by the International Taekwon-Do Federation. The pattern consists of 24 movements and is taught to students with the 5th dan (black belt) and necessary to know to obtain the 6th dan.

== Meaning ==
The pattern is named after Sejong the Great, the 4th King of Joseon who ruled in the 15th century. He is widely regarded as the greatest king in Korean history, and is particularly remembered for the creation of Hangul, the native alphabet of the Korean language. Moreover, his reign was marked by major developments in science, technology, medicine, agriculture, and the arts, with Sejong participating actively in many advances. Sejong is regarded as an icon of Korean culture in South Korea, where he has received numerous tributes. Sejong City, the administrative capital of the country, bears his name.

=== Number of movements ===
The 24 movements in Se-Jong refer to the 24 letters of the Korean alphabet.

== Movements ==
Nr.	English description	Korean description (in Hangul)	Korean description (in Revised Romanisation)
	Closed ready stance B facing D	모아준비서기	moa junbi seogi
1	Move the left foot to B, forming a left walking stance toward B at the same time executing a low block to B with the left forearm.	걷는서팔목낮은데막기	geonneun seo palmok najeunde makgi
2	Bring the left foot to the right foot, and then move the right foot to A to form a left L-stance toward A while executing a twin forearm block.	ㄴ자서쌍팔목막기	nieunja seo ssang palmok makgi
3	Execute a middle side piercing kick to D with the right foot.	가운데옆차지르기	gaunde yeop cha jireugi
4	Lower the right foot to D, and then move the left foot to F to form a left walking stance toward F while executing a rising block with the left forearm.	걷는서추켜막기	geonneun seo chukyeo makgi
5	Bring the left foot to the right foot, and then move the right foot to E to form a sitting stance toward D while executing a middle strike to E with the right knife-hand.	앉는서손칼옆때리기	anneun seo sonkal yeop ttaerigi
6	Bring the right foot to the left foot, forming a closed ready stance B toward D.	모아준비서기	moa junbi seogi
7	Jump to D to form a left X-stance toward DG while executing a high side strike to D with the left back fist, bringing the right finger belly to the left side fist.	뛰며겨차서등주먹높은데옆때리기	ttwimyeo gyeocha seo deung jumeok nopeunde yeop ttaerigi
8	Move the right foot to G, forming a right walking stance toward G while executing a high punch to G with the right fist.	걷는서높은데앞지르기	geonneun seo nopeunde ap jireugi
9	Move the right foot on line GH to form a left fixed stance toward H while executing a high guarding block to H with the forearm.	고정서팔목높은데대비막기	gojeong seo palmok nopeunde daebi makgi
10	Move the right foot to H, forming a right walking stance toward H while executing a middle thrust to H with the right straight finger tip.	걷는서선손끝뚫기	geonneun seo seonsonkkeut ttulki
11	Bring the right foot to the left foot, and then move the left foot to G to form a left walking stance toward G while executing a high side strike to G with the left back fist.	걷는서등주먹높은데옆때리기	geonneun seo deung jumeok nopeunde yeop ttaerigi
12	Move the left foot on line GH to form a sitting stance toward C while executing a scooping block with the left palm.	앉는서손바닥들어막기	anneun seo sonbadak deureo makgi
13	Execute a middle turning kick to C with the left foot.	가운데돌려차기	gaunde dollyeo chagi
14	Lower the left foot to C in a jumping motion, forming a left X-stance toward CF while executing a high block to C with the left double forearm.	뛰며겨차서두팔목높은데막기	ttwimyeo gyeocha seo du palmok nopeunde makgi
15	Move the right foot to F to form a sitting stance toward C while extending the right fist horizontally to C. Perform in a slow motion.	앉는서기, 느린동작	anneun seogi, neurin dongjak
16	Execute a front strike to C with the left back fist while maintaining a sitting stance toward C.	앉는서등주먹앞때리기	anneun seo deung jumeok ap ttaerigi
17	Bring the right foot behind the left foot, and then move the left foot to E, forming a left diagonal stance toward C while executing a pressing block with a twin palm.	이보옮겨디디며나가기사선서쌍손바닥눌러막기	ibo olgyeo didimyeo nagagi saseon seo ssang sonbadak nulleo makgi
18	Execute a middle block to C with a double arc-hand while forming a left walking stance toward CE.	걷는서두반달손가운데막기	geonneun seo du bandalson gaunde makgi
19	Pull the left reverse footsword to the right knee joint to form a right one-leg stance toward C at the same time executing a high side block to F with the right outer forearm and a low side block to E with the left forearm.	외발서바깥팔목높은데옆막기팔목낮은데반대옆막기	oebal seo bakkat palmok nopeunde yeop makgi palmok najeunde bandae yeop makgi
20	Lower the left foot to D forming a right walking stance toward C while executing a pressing block with the right palm. Perform in a slow motion.	걷는서손바닥바로눌러막기, 느린동작	geonneun seo sonbadak baro nulleo makgi, neurin dongjak
21	Pull the left instep to the hollow of the right leg to form a right one-leg stance toward C while striking the left palm with the right back forearm.	외발서등주먹옆앞때리기	oebal seo deung jumeok yeop ap ttaerigi
22	Lower the left foot to C, turning clockwise to form a right fixed stance toward D while thrusting to C with the left side elbow.	고정서때팔굽뚫기	gojeong seo ttae palgup ttulki
23	Move the right foot to A, forming a left L-stance toward A while executing a high guarding block to A with a knife-hand.	ㄴ자서손칼데옆때대비막기	nieunja seo sonkal de yeop ttae daebi makgi
24	Bring the right foot to the left foot, and then move the left foot to B to form a right L-stance toward B while executing a middle punch to B with the right fist.	ㄴ자서바로앞지르기	nieunja seo baro ap jireugi
	Move the left foot to the closed ready stance B facing D.	모아준비서기	moa junbi seogi

== Trivia ==
- Se-Jong is one of the patterns that refers to the Joseon era, next to Yul-Gok, Toi-Gye, Choong-Moo, Choong-Jang, and So-San.
- Se-Jong is the only pattern in which no technique is repeated. The 24 different techniques symbolize the 24 different Hangul letters that Sejong the Great invented.
- The diagram of the pattern (王) represents the Hanja character for 'king'.
