= Taekwondo student oath =

Oath taken by athletes

The taekwondo student oath is typically recited at the beginning of a class in taekwondo, either with students repeating after the instructor or in unison, students and the instructor speaking at the same time.

The purpose of the student oath is to remind students of their obligations to their art, instructors, fellow students, people outside of their school, and to society at large. The oath is generally repeated at the beginning of class, after students “bow in”. Bowing-in is a process that usually includes bowing simultaneously to the International Taekwon-Do Federation flag or the ITF flag and the flag of the country in which the school is located, bowing to the head instructor, and finally, bowing to the instructors who will be conducting the class.

Usually, the student oath is preceded by a recitation of a list of tenets of taekwondo. The instructor typically would prompt the class to repeat the student oath and tenets of taekwondo.

The tenets of taekwondo are often given in a list of five: courtesy, integrity, perseverance, self-control and indomitable spirit.

Following recitation of the tenets, students then recite the student oath, as follows:

- Observe the tenets of taekwondo.
- Respect all seniors and instructors.
- Never misuse taekwondo.
- Be a champion of freedom and justice.
- Help to build a more peaceful world.

The tenets of taekwondo are:

1. Courtesy
2. Integrity
3. Perseverance
4. Self-control
5. Indomitable spirit

This is normally done in ITF Taekwondo and other offshoot taekwondo federations like the GTF or UITF.

== Sources ==
- Tedeschi, Marc. Taekwondo: Traditions, Philosophy, Technique. New York: Weatherhill, 2003, p. 50. ISBN 978-1891640735.
- Young Brothers Taekwondo Institute
