= Thế Tông =

Thế Tông (世宗) may refer to:

- Lê Thế Tông
- Nguyễn Thế Tông
