= Kyū =

Rating system used in East Asia

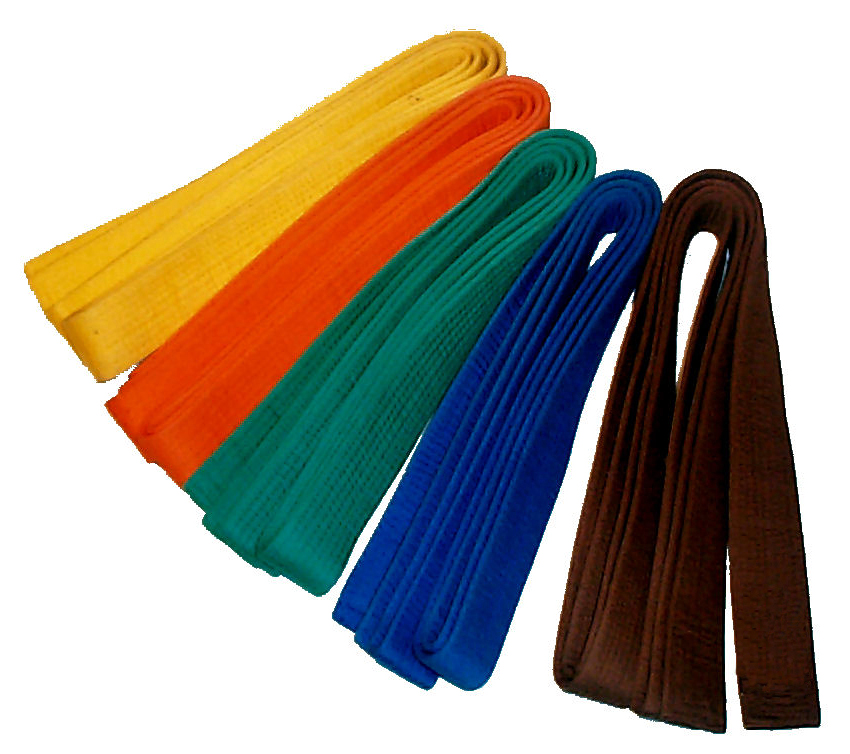
- Coloured belts are worn by kyū ranked practitioners in many martial arts, including judo, karate, aikido, Kuk Sool Won and taekwondo.

Japanese name
- Kanji: 級
- Hiragana: きゅう
Transcriptions
- Revised Hepburn: kyū

Kyū (Japanese: 級; [kʲɯː]) is a Japanese term used in modern martial arts as well as in tea ceremony, flower arranging, Go, shogi, academic tests and other similar activities to designate various grades, levels or degrees of proficiency or experience. In Mandarin Chinese, the same character 級 is pronounced jí, and the term is used for academic tests. In Korea, the term geup (급, 級) is used (also transliterated as gup or kup). In Vietnamese martial arts, it is known as cấp (khớp).

== History ==
The Tokyo Metropolitan Police Department started a ranking system using kyū to measure the police officers' ability in Kendo. Grades were from 8th to 1st.

In the 1890s, the Greater Japan Martial Virtue Society introduced the dan and kyū ranking system to various martial arts in Japan.

== Martial arts usage ==
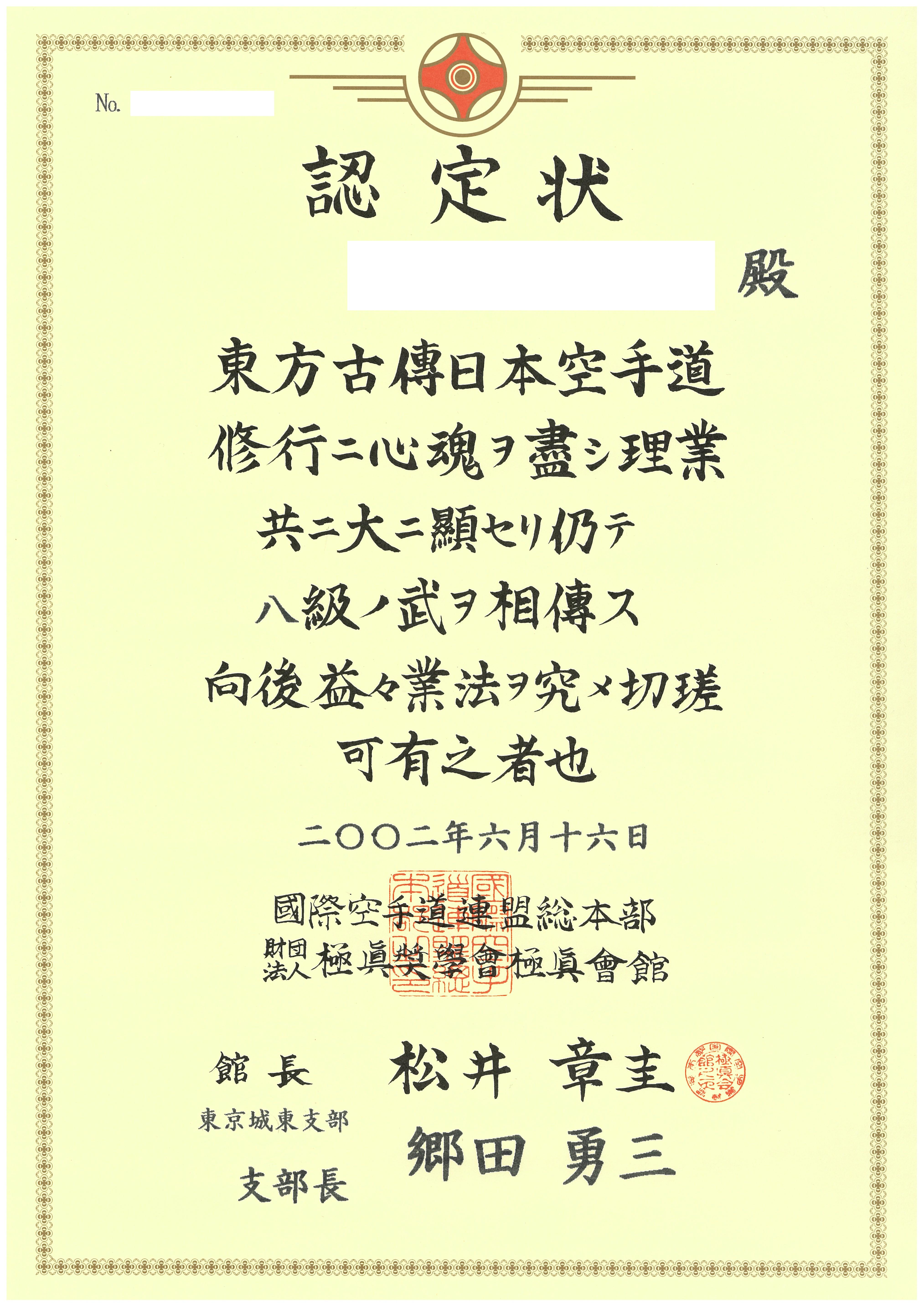
The certificate of 8th kyū in karate.

In modern Japanese martial arts, kyū-level practitioners hold the ranks below dan or black belt. The kyū ranking system varies from art to art and school to school. In some arts, all the kyū-level practitioners wear white belts while in others different coloured belts, tags or stripes are used; in kendo for example the belt system is not used. Although some aikido schools do use a coloured belt system the norm is for kyū grades to wear a white belt, and for dan grades to wear a black belt. Kyū-level practitioners are often called mudansha (無段者), "ones without rank", and are considered as initiates rather than students. When practitioners have reached the ranking of first degree black belt, they become shodan (初段). The holder of a black belt of any degree is a yūdansha (有段者), "one with rank".

== Academic tests usage ==
Martial arts' organizations are not the only ones who use such a system. Some academic and professional organizations also use kyū and dan as measures of a person's ability. For instance, the Japan Kanji Aptitude Test which tests a person's ability to correctly read, write, and use kanji, is graded using kyū.

== List of kyū ranks ==
Kyū ranks progress using a descending order system, so 1st kyū is the highest. For example, the first kyū outranks the 2nd kyū. The Dan ranking system starts after 1st kyū. Essentially, the kyū is the number of steps before reaching mastery whereas the dan gives steps into mastery.

Pre-1st kyū and pre-2nd kyū are used in examinations of languages, because it is often hard to pass the examinations at 1st and 2nd kyū.

Grade	Pronunciation	Japanese
1st (Highest)	Ikkyū	1級 / 一級
Pre-1st	Jun'ikkyū	準1級 / 準一級
2nd	Nikyū	2級 / 二級
Pre-2nd	Junnikyū	準2級 / 準二級
3rd	Sankyū	3級 / 三級
4th	Yonkyū	4級 / 四級
5th	Gokyū	5級 / 五級
6th	Rokkyū	6級 / 六級
7th	Nanakyū	7級 / 七級
8th	Hakkyū / Hachikyu	8級 / 八級
9th	Kyūkyū	9級 / 九級
10th	Jikkyū / Jukkyū	10級 / 十級
Ungraded	Mukyū	無級

The lowest kyū is sometimes called "Mukyū" (無級) which means "ungraded" in English. The lowest kyū depends on organizations. For instance, the United States Judo Federation has 12th kyū as the lowest grade for junior class, and 7th kyū as the lowest for adult class.

In Japan, the difficulty is classified into three categories as in the following list:

Grade	Pronunciation	Japanese
Highest	Jōkyū	上級
Middle	Chūkyū	中級
Beginning	Shokyū	初級

== Coloured belts ==
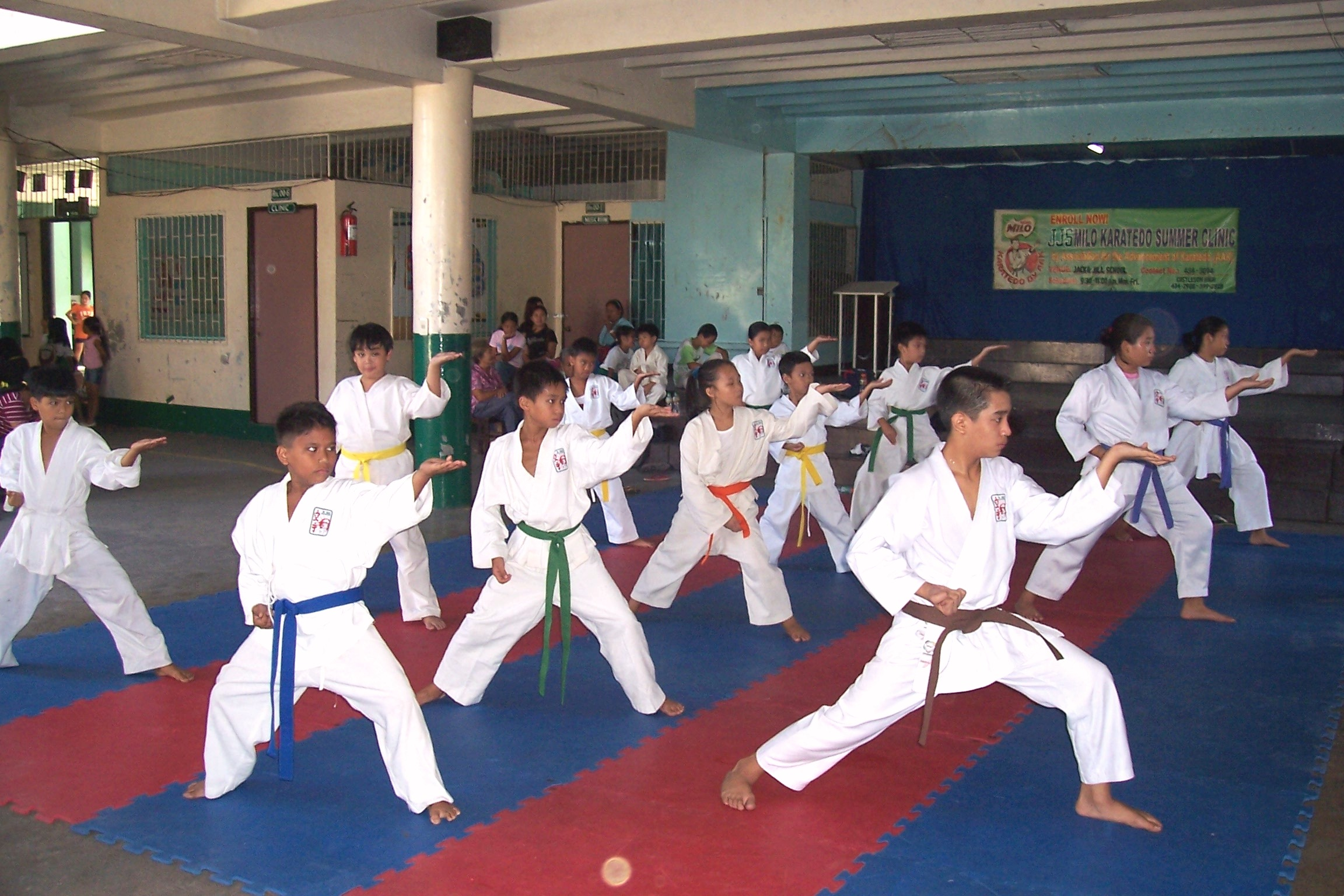
Karateka wearing different coloured belts

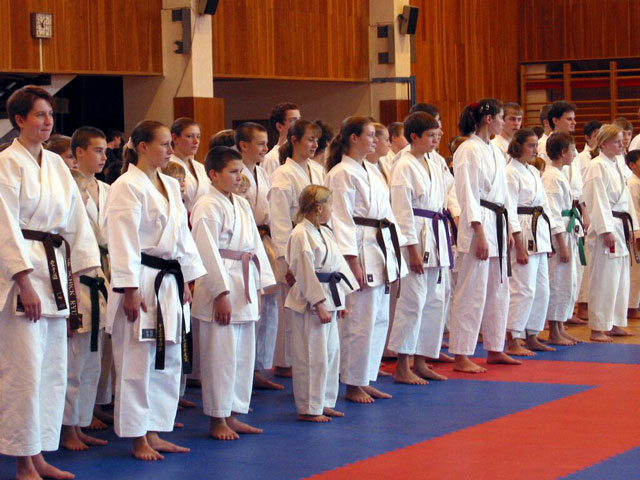
Karatekas at the dojo with different colored belts

In some styles, students wear white belts until they receive their first dan rank or black belt, while in others a range of colors are used for different kyū grades. The wearing of coloured belts is often associated with kyū ranks, particularly in modern martial arts such as karate and judo (where the practice originated). However, there is no standard association of belt colours with particular ranks and different schools and organizations assign colours independently; see Rank in Judo for examples of variation within an art. However, white is often the lowest ranked belt and brown is the highest kyū rank, and it is common to see the darker colors associated with the higher ranks, i.e., the closest to black belt. Historically, students of martial arts would only have one belt or obi, which they would hand-dye when the next ranking was achieved. Because dyes (as opposed to paints) are transparent, the colours applied must progress from light to dark since the previous colour affects the new colour that is being applied, i.e. yellow shows through when overdying the obi with red or blue, thus the progression of colours from yellow through orange, then green, then blue, then brown, for example.

The system of using different colored belts to mark rank is not universally accepted in the martial arts. Supporters of the belt colors point out their use as a simple visual key for experience, such as in matching opponents for sparring, allowing opponents to somewhat accurately judge each other's skill, and to split them for competitions. Those who oppose the use of coloured belts are also often concerned that students will worry too much about relative rank, and become arrogant with trivial promotions and differences, while supporters feel that by providing small signs of success and recognition, students are more confident, and their training is more structured, and that the ranking system encourages higher-ranked students to assist lower-ranked ones, and lower-ranked students to respect their seniors.

On the 1984 martial arts film The Karate Kid, a dialogue between characters Daniel LaRusso, a karate student, and Mr. Miyagi, his master, expresses the opposition by some martial arts teachers to the use of colored belts and to karate ranks themselves, by stressing the priority of mental and emotional ability in learning karate over attaining ranks and belts. When asked by LaRusso about "what kind of belt" he has, Miyagi jokingly answers "Canvas. JC Penney, $3.98" — stating the brand, store and price of his waist belt — and gives LaRusso a visual lecture in which he points to the head, chest and waist, stating that karate comes from the heart and the mind, never from the belt.

== See also ==
- Dan (rank)
- Rank in Judo
- Go ranks and ratings
- Karate ranks
