= Michael Gittes =

American painter

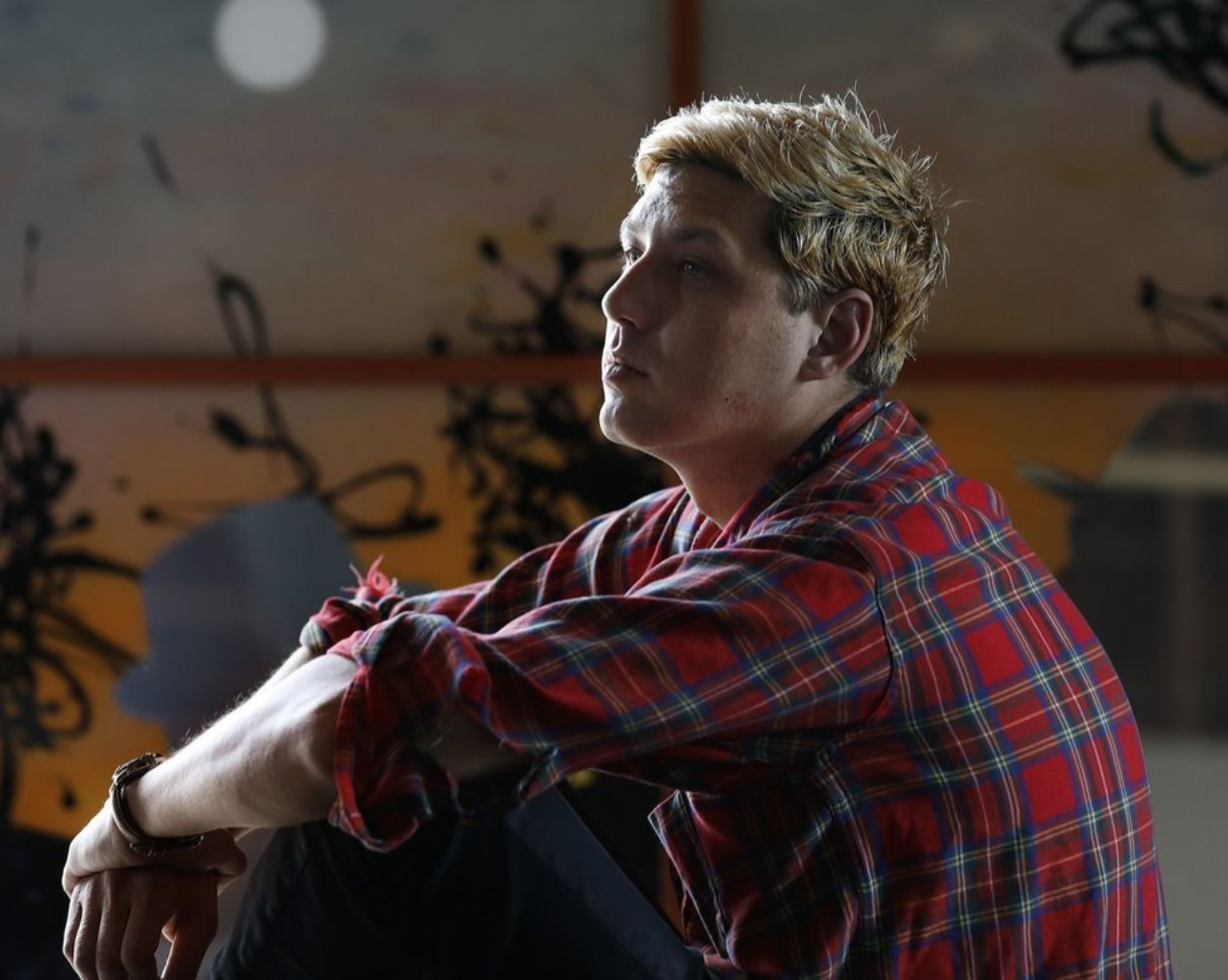
- Michael Gittes, 2018
- Born: Michael Arthur Gittes II; 26 October 1987 (age 38)
- Education: Wesleyan University
- Style: Painter and Video Artist

Michael Gittes (born Michael Arthur Gittes II; 26 October 1987), a graduate of Wesleyan University, is an American painter and video artist who lives and works in Los Angeles, CA.

== Family ==
- Ahn Chang Ho Great-Grandfather - He and his wife were the first Koreans to legally immigrate to the United States as a married couple. He was a key founding member of the Provisional Government of the Republic of Korea in Shanghai in 1919. He is also one of two men believed to have written the lyrics of the South Korean national anthem, "Aegukga".
- Philip Ahn Great-Uncle - Widely regarded as the first Korean American film actor in Hollywood and the first Korean American born in the United States.
- Susan Ahn Cuddy Grandmother - The first female gunnery officer in the United States Navy and the first Asian American woman in United States Naval Intelligence.
- Harry Gittes Father - American film producer and the namesake of Jack Nicholson's character in Chinatown.
- Christine Cuddy Mother - Entertainment attorney.

== Career ==
In 2013, Gittes exhibited in the Veterans' Room at The Park Avenue Armory. The show, Moments In The Bellum, explored subjects of the Civil War off the battlefield.

In 2014, Gittes exhibited his work at the Korean Demilitarized Zone. He painted a pre-1910 flag of a unified Korea and raised it at the DMZ after securing permission from both Koreas and the United Nations. The exhibition was inspired by and dedicated to his great grandfather, Ahn Chang Ho.

In 2018, Gittes organized a show with his psychiatrist to celebrate the 10-year anniversary of his release from several days spent in a mental institution in Middletown, Connecticut. The show was titled Since We Met, and consisted of both Gittes's and his psychiatrist's artwork. From the LA Times "...a celebration of their relationship and a tribute to art’s role in Gittes’s recovery. It is also, some will say, a problematic blurring of the therapeutic boundary between doctor and patient."

After being selected by the National Portrait Gallery, London to contribute a portrait of Michael Jackson for the 2018 show, Michael Jackson: On The Wall, Gittes created a video installation, stating "...he felt any painting simply would not capture his favourite thing about Jackson: 'his movement.'" Other artists in the show include Andy Warhol, Keith Haring, and Kehinde Wiley. The exhibition premiered at National Portrait Gallery, London, and traveled to Grand Palais, Bundeskunsthalle, and Espoo Museum of Modern Art in Finland.

In July 2020, Gittes donated a collection of 1,800 paintings to Interfaith Medical Center in Bed-Stuy as gifts to the nurses, doctors, janitors, security guards, dietary aids, and back office administrators, to show appreciation for their work during the Covid-19 pandemic. The project, entitled "Strangers to No One", depicted flowers that were created using syringes.
