= Ralph Ahn =

American actor (1926–2022)

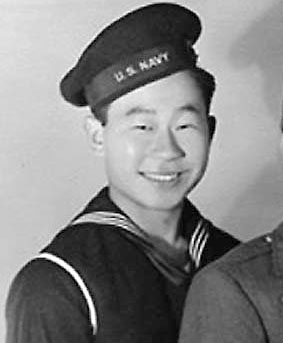
- Ahn in his World War II Navy uniform
- Born: Ralph Philander Ahn; September 28, 1926; Los Angeles, California, U.S.
- Died: February 26, 2022 (aged 95); Los Angeles, California, U.S.
- Education: Los Angeles State College
- Occupations: Actor; teacher
- Years active: 1940s–2018
- Father: Ahn Changho
- Relatives: Philip Ahn (brother); Susan Ahn Cuddy (sister)

Korean name
- Hangul: 안필영
- Hanja: 安必英
- RR: An Pilyeong
- MR: An P'iryŏng

Ralph Philander Ahn (September 28, 1926 – February 26, 2022) was an American actor. He was the last surviving son of leading Korean independence activist Dosan Ahn Chang-ho. His father's contributions to the Korean independence movement influenced Ahn's involvement in politics, World War II, and support for the Korean community of Los Angeles.

As an actor, Ahn was known for his roles in Lawnmower Man 2: Beyond Cyberspace (1996), Amityville: A New Generation (1993), and Panther (1995), as well as in the sitcom New Girl as the silent but wise character Tran.

== Early life ==
Ahn was born in Los Angeles on September 28, 1926. He was the youngest child of Ahn Chang-ho and his wife, who were among the first wave of Korean immigrants in 1902. They were the first Korean couple to emigrate from Korea to the U.S. mainland.

Three years after his father's death, the Japanese bombed Pearl Harbor and the United States entered World War II. Ahn consequently joined the U.S. Navy in 1944 to fight the Japanese. He is one of an estimated 100 Korean-Americans who served over the course of the war.

== Career ==
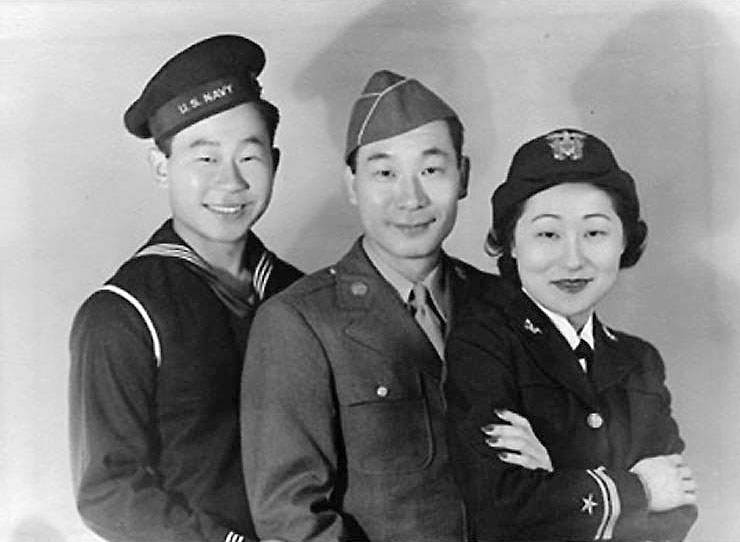
The Ahn siblings, with Ralph (left), Philip (center), and Susan (right)

After World War II, Ahn was influenced by his elder brother, Philip Ahn, one of the first Asian American actors, and became an actor. He made his film debut in Battle Circus (1953), in which he played a Korean prisoner. He appeared in Mission Over Korea later that same year, and had minor roles in Prisoner of War (starring alongside Ronald Reagan) and The Bamboo Prison the following year. Ahn also opened a restaurant with his family in 1954, which served Cantonese food due to the lack of demand for Korean cuisine at the time. He later featured in Battle Hymn (1957), Confessions of an Opium Eater (1962), and The Hook (1963). During a four-year hiatus from acting between 1964 and 1968, Ahn taught business math, and served as head coach of the varsity football team at Bishop Alemany High School in Mission Hills.

After the death of his wife, Ahn stopped teaching and returned to manage the family restaurant. He resumed his acting career in 1988, starring in It Takes Two, as well as The Golden Girls series. He gained national recognition as an actor in 2012 when he began portraying the recurring character Tran in season 2 of New Girl. He continued to portray the character until the show ended in 2018.

On January 1, 2017, Ahn welcomed the cast members of the popular South Korean variety show Infinite Challenge to Los Angeles as a representative of the Korean-American community. In March of the same year, he spoke at a ceremony in Riverside, California, honoring Pachappa Camp as the first Korean settlement in the US.

== Personal life ==
Ahn was married to his wife, Rita, until her death in 1967. Together, they had two daughters. She also had three sons from a previous marriage.

== Death ==
Ahn died in Los Angeles on February 26, 2022, at the age of 95. He had been hospitalized with an unspecified illness prior to his death.

== Filmography ==
- Battle Circus (1953) – Korean Prisoner (uncredited)
- Mission Over Korea (1953) – Korean Radio Operator (uncredited)
- Prisoner of War (1954) – Red Guard
- The Bamboo Prison (1954) – Korean Guard (uncredited)
- Battle Hymn (1957) – ROK Officer (uncredited)
- Confessions of an Opium Eater (1962) – Wah Chan
- The Hook (1963) – Major Chun
- It Takes Two (1988) – Wang
- The Golden Girls (1988–1989, TV Series) – Mr. Yakamora / Jim Shu
- Let It Ride (1989) – Patron in Chinese Restaurant
- The Perfect Weapon (1991) – Gi
- Life Stinks (1991) – Chinese cook
- Eyes of an Angel (1991) – Liquor Store Clerk
- Younger and Younger (1993) – Asian Man
- Come the Morning (1993) – Printer
- Panther (1995) – Mr. Yang
- Lawnmower Man 2: Beyond Cyberspace (1996) – Doctor
- Gilmore Girls (2005–2006, TV Series) – Korean Man
- New Girl (2012–2018, TV Series) – Tran
