= Voodoo Heartbeat =

- Directed by: Charles Nizet
- Written by: Charles Nizet
- Produced by: Ray Molina
- Starring: Ray Molina; Philip Ahn; Ern Dugo; Forrest Duke; Ebby Rhodes; Mike Zapata; Ray Molina Jr. Stan Mason; Mary Martinez; Mike Meyers
- Production companies: TWI National; Ray Molina Productions
- Distributed by: TWI National; Vinegar Syndrome (Blu-ray)
- Release date: October 1975
- Running time: 88 minutes
- Countries: United States; Belgium
- Language: English

Voodoo Heartbeat (also known as The Sex Serum of Dr. Blake) is a 1972 exploitation horror film directed by Charles Nizet and starring Ray Molina, Philip Ahn, Ern Dugo, Forrest Duke, Ebby Rhodes, Mike Zapata, Ray Molina Jr., Stan Mason, Mary Martinez & Mike Meyers.

== Plot ==
An experimental serum turns a man into a fanged killer beast.

== Cast ==
- Ray Molina as Dr. Blake
- Philip Ahn as Mao Tse Tung
- Ern Dugo as Prof. Grant
- Forrest Duke as Dr. Bernstein (as Forest Duke)
- Will Long as Professor Larsen
- Stan Mason as Inspector Brady
- Ben Smith as Prof. Long
- Mike Zapata
- Chuck Alford as Capt. Popejoy
- Mike Meyers
- Ebby Rhodes as Dr. Blake's Daughter
- Ross Thompson
- Mary Martinez
- Lalo Rivers
- Ernie Chavez
- Ray Molina Jr.
- Carme Petrillo

== Production ==
The film was shot in ATF Studios in Las Vegas, Nevada.

In 1972, the president of TWI International, Robert Saxton, announced that Mike Zapata was going to be the top star of the motion picture and television in a couple of years, but this is only film role.

== Release and rediscovery ==
The film was theatrically released in October 1975 by TWI National.

Also, this film screened at the Cannes Film Festival in 1970.
