= Ross Thompson =

Ross Thompson may refer to:

- Ross Thompson (actor), Australian actor
- Ross Thompson (boxer) (born 1973), American boxer
- Ross Thompson (rugby union, born 1999), Scotland rugby union international
- Ross Thompson (rugby union, born 1963), Japan rugby union international
- Ross Thompson (professor), American author and research psychologist

== See also ==
- Ross Thomson, Scottish politician
