= Pachappa Camp =

1904 – c.1920 Korean American settlement

- 파차파 캠프 (Korean)
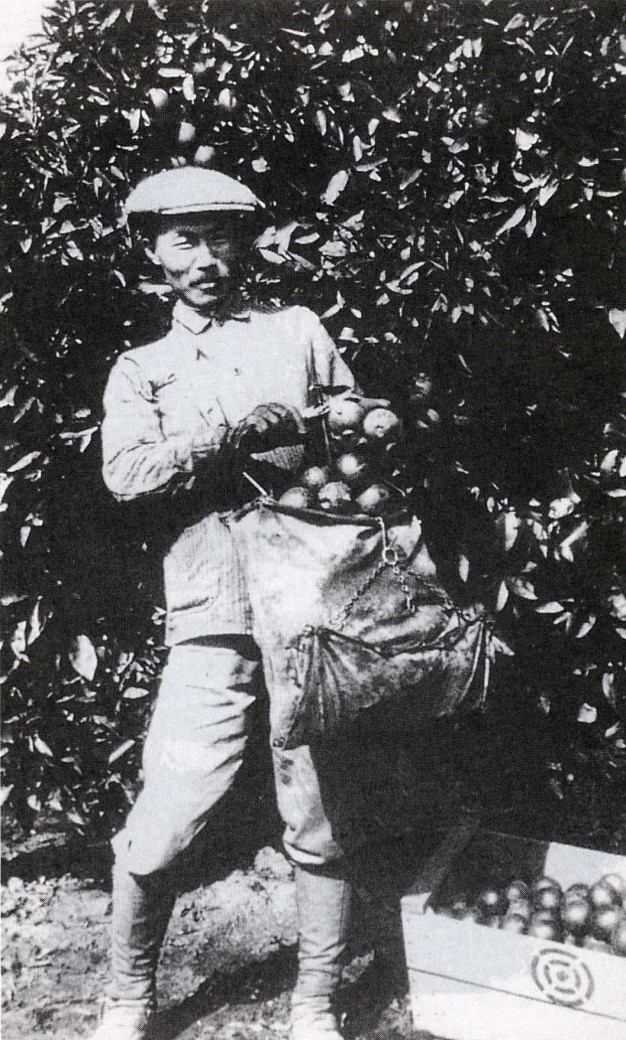
- Ahn Chang Ho picking oranges in Riverside (1912)
- Interactive map of Pachappa Camp
- 33.9718°N 117.3717°W
- Location: Riverside, California

History
- Founded: 1904

Pachappa Camp (also known as Dosan's Republic) was founded in 1904 and is one of the earliest significant Korean settlements established in the United States. Located in downtown Riverside, California, it was founded by Ahn Changho (also known by his pen name Dosan), one of the earliest Korean immigrants to the United States and a prominent Korean independence activist. The settlement was active until 1918 and at peak season hosted nearly 300 people. Pachappa Camp is labeled the first Korean settlement in the United States by several historians and the Riverside City government. On March 23, 2017, the Riverside City Council designated the Pachappa Camp site as a "Point of Cultural Interest".

== History ==
=== Founding ===
Pachappa Camp was founded in 1904 by Ahn Chang Ho, who is also known by his pen name "Dosan". Dosan and his wife, Helen Ahn, first arrived in San Francisco in 1902 to study Christianity and the English language but faced barriers finding employment due to anti-Asian sentiment in the area. Dosan and Helen moved to Riverside in 1904, with encouragement from two Korean friends who worked on citrus farms there and spoke of plentiful job openings. Despite the availability of jobs, Korean immigrants found difficulty in getting employment in agriculture due to the Japanese monopoly on labor contracts and the lack of their own labor bureau.

Dosan became acquainted with Cornelius Earle Rumsey, a retired executive of the National Biscuit Company, a church member of the local Calvary Presbyterian Church, and the owner of Alta Cresta Groves. Cornelius offered employment to Dosan and other Korean immigrants at the grove, as well as a $1500 loan to lease housing and office space for a Korean employment agency. The Korean Employment Bureau (also known as the Korean Labor Bureau) was set up in the Pachappa Camp location in downtown Riverside and was in operation by April 1905. It provided Korean immigrants with employment opportunities and ultimately spurred the growth of the Korean population and community in Riverside.

Many Koreans who arrived in San Francisco and were directed to Riverside to find work were Christian converts. They carried letters from American church leaders in Korea that certified full communion and they went on to attend, build relationships, and work on joint efforts with the Calvary Presbyterian Church. Rumsey's loan was paid back within two months as more Korean immigrants moved to Riverside and found work. Eventually, the Korean immigrants rented and moved into the barracks nearby the labor bureau at the camp.

=== Growth and daily life ===
The site consisted of a community center duplex along with approximately twenty single-story living spaces. These buildings were originally constructed in the 1880s for Chinese workers who built the Santa Fe Railroad and were maintained in poor condition thereafter. The houses were not equipped with gas, water, or electricity, thus the residents used shared outdoor water pumps and outhouses.

Unlike labor camps, the camp was home to men, women, and children, and the family-based community was self-organized and governed. A strong sense of community was fostered within the settlement via the sharing of family-based values and lifestyles. Many men found work on the farms while others found work in local shops, hotels, hospitals, and as domestic laborers for wealthy families. The women spent their time maintaining and cleaning homes and cooking for the community. During harvest time, Korean women also worked at local packinghouses to help pack boxes of citrus fruit. The residents, led by Dosan, also allocated time and money to the Korean Independence movement. Funds were also sent back to Korea to help mitigate the famine the country was facing at the time.

In 1905, residents worked alongside the Calvary Presbyterian Church to establish a mission at the settlement. The mission provided English classes, social and cultural exchanges between the two church groups, and church services to its members. Over 200 Korean immigrants lived in the camp by 1907, 50-60 of whom attended church services.

=== Gongnip Hyophoe (Cooperative Association) ===
Under the Japan-Korea Treaty of 1905, the short-lived Korean Empire became a protectorate of the Empire of Japan. That same year, Dosan and other community leaders established the Gongnip Hyophoe, also known as "Cooperative Association," to develop democratic policies and institutions for the future founding of a democratic and independent Korean nation. The association established behavioral guidelines for the Pachappa residents in an effort to maintain cohesion and instill "positive virtues": lights were to be turned off at 9:00pm, Korean women were prohibited from smoking long pipes in the street, residents were not to go outside in undershirts, and white shirts were encouraged whenever possible to give off a "clean appearance." The Korean newspaper, Sinhan Minbo, reported 70 Gongnip Hyophoe members in Riverside in 1905, and 150 in 1907.

Gongnip Hyophoe eventually merged with Hapsong Hyophoe (the United Korean Society in Hawaii) and was thereafter known as the Korean National Association (KNA). Headquartered in San Francisco, the KNA provided help to Koreans newly arriving in the mainland United States. KNA chapters were founded throughout the United States and were significant for organizing Korean immigrants in their fight for Korean sovereignty.

=== The Hemet Valley Incident ===
In 1913, 11 Korean immigrants found work providing extra help with apricot picking in the nearby city of Hemet. Around this time, anti-Japanese and general anti-Asian sentiment was high. The Korean laborers were threatened by white laborers at the Hemet Valley train depot and the Korean laborers fled. The Japanese Association of Southern California urged the consul general of San Francisco to address the incident, arguing that the Korean laborers should be treated as Japanese subjects. The Koreans living in the United States prior to the formal occupation by the Japanese in Korea refused assistance, arguing that they were not Japanese citizens and that the issue was a separate, Korean issue.

With concerns surrounding the already strained U.S.-Japan relations (e.g., from the 1913 California Alien Land Law), Secretary of State William Jennings Bryan ordered an investigation into the matter. The president of KNA at the time, David Lee, communicated to Bryan via telegram that the issue was resolved and requested that the United States government end its dealings with the Japanese government regarding Korean immigrants in the United States. Bryan then published a press release announcing that the Hemet Valley Incident was settled, which functionally served as a de facto recognition of the Korean national status of Koreans in the United States. Korean immigrants who arrived in San Francisco were treated as political refugees and were thus able to land.

=== Closure ===
In January 1913, extreme freezing temperatures devastated citrus production across California. As a result, job opportunities decreased and Koreans were forced to look for work outside of Riverside. Community members relocated to Los Angeles, as well as to Central and Northern California. In January 1918, the Riverside Chapter of the KNA closed. The 1920 U.S. Census showed less than ten Korean families residing in Riverside with none of them living in the settlement site nor in the vicinity. After Korean Americans departed from the site, Pachappa Camp was settled into by Japanese Americans, and later Mexican Americans. In the 1950s, the site was redeveloped for commercial use by oil and gas companies. The site today consists of parking lots, fencing, cinder block buildings, and gas stations. The adjacent railroad track is the sole remnant of the original settlement.

== Legacy ==
Some historians argue that Pachappa camp should be considered the first Korean American settlement, because aside from Hawaii, Koreans were also scattered throughout cities like San Francisco but lacked their own distinct neighborhoods. This label is disputed by historian John Cha. Though Korean immigration to the United States started in Hawaii, the Korean laborers lived and worked on plantations for at least three to four years before developing their own settlement.

The camp is also notable as being the site of where Ahn founded the New People's Association (also "Sinminhoe"), one of the earliest and most significant Korean associations in the United States. It is also where Ahn formulated the idea for the 1913 Young Korean Academy ("Heungsadan").

=== Memorial of Dosan in downtown Riverside ===
In 1999, the Patriot Ahn Chang-Ho Memorial Foundation of Riverside began fundraising efforts for a memorial to Dosan. The Korean government, along with over 400 individuals, raised more than $600,000 and the dedication ceremony took place on August 11, 2001. The memorial is located at 3750 Main Street in downtown Riverside and consists of stamped and colored concrete and landscaping granite, as well as a statue of Dosan.

=== Designation as a Point of Cultural Interest ===
On December 6, 2016, the Riverside City Council voted unanimously to make the site of Pachappa Camp the city's first Point of Cultural Interest and have a memorial installed at the site. Located in downtown Riverside, California, the original address of the site was 1532 Pachappa Avenue but has since been changed to 3096 Cottage Street. According to Riverside's Historic Preservation Officer, city officials spent six months researching the legitimacy of Pachappa Camp as the United States' first Korean settlement, using documented records of births, deaths, and social activities.

== See also ==
- Asian immigration to the United States
- History of Asian Americans
