= Michael Lamb (psychologist) =

Zambian psychologist

- Born: Zambia
- Education: PhD
- Alma mater: University of Natal, Yale University
- Known for: Research about: Child abuse, Shared parenting, Fatherhood
- Scientific career
- Fields: Psychology
- Workplaces: University of Cambridge
- Thesis: The relationships between infants and their mothers and fathers (1976)

Michael E. Lamb is a professor and former Head of the then Department of Social and Developmental Psychology at the University of Cambridge, known for his influential work in developmental psychology, child and family policy, social welfare, and law. His work has focused on divorce, child custody, child maltreatment, child testimony, and the effects of childcare on children's social and emotional development. His work in family relationships has focused on the role of both mothers and fathers and the importance of their relationships with children. Lamb's expertise has influenced legal decisions addressing same-sex parenting, advocating for fostering and adoption by adults regardless of their marital status or sexual orientations. Lamb has published approximately 700 articles, many about child adjustment, currently edits the APA journal Psychology, Public Policy, and Law, and serves on the editorial boards on several academic journals.

== Education and career ==
Michael E. Lamb was born and grew up in Northern Rhodesia (now Zambia). He completed a degree in psychology and economics at the University of Natal in South Africa in 1972, before emigrating to the USA to pursue postgraduate studies in psychology at Johns Hopkins University. As a student of Mary Ainsworth, Lamb developed his understanding of early social development research and observational methodology. He later completed his doctoral degree at Yale University, where his research on infant-parent attachment drew heavily on attachment theory and was facilitated by a chance encounter with Urie Bronfenbrenner. Bronfenbrenner encouraged Lamb to observe infants with their mothers and fathers, emphasizing the importance of ecological validity in research. Lamb conducted a comprehensive longitudinal study on early family relationships, laying the groundwork for his influential work on children's development. Ed Zigler also played an important role in supporting Lamb’s work at this time, reinforcing the significance of bridging theory and practice and conducting rigorous research.

Lamb has worked for the University of Wisconsin-Madison, the University of Michigan, and the University of Utah. In 1987, he joined the National Institute of Child Health and Human Development (NICHD) as a Senior Research Scientist, where he established the Section on Social and Emotional Development. In 2004, Lamb moved to the University of Cambridge, where he continued his impactful research in applied developmental psychology.

== Major contributions ==
=== Factors affecting children's adjustment ===
==== Parent-child relationships ====
===== Attachments =====
Michael E. Lamb's work has contributed to understanding of infant-parent attachment and its influence on children's development. Lamb's longitudinal study of infants with their mothers and fathers revealed the broad range of significant relationships established in early childhood, emphasizing not only the mother-child bond but also the importance of father-child and other significant relationships, such as siblings and regular care providers.

===== Variations in father involvement =====
Building on his research on parent-child relationships, Lamb has explored variations in father involvement and their effects on children's development. This has included traditional and non-traditional families, single fathers, families in economic struggle, and those at risk regarding domestic violence. Lamb is editor of the book, The Role of the Father in Child Development, now in its fifth edition.

===== Divorce and parental separation =====
Lamb's research on children's adjustment after divorce shed light on the psychological and emotional effects of parental separation. Lamb's research demonstrated the crucial role of both mother-child and father-child relationships in promoting children's well-being after parental separation, informing guidelines for shared parenting arrangements. Together with colleagues Ross Thompson and David Chambers, Lamb challenged the prevailing notion that children would fare best after their parents' divorce if the relationships with the "primary" parent (usually mothers) were protected, even at the expense of contact with non-resident parents (usually fathers). He has stated that hundreds of papers show a higher risk of maladjustment in children when parents have separated and that maintaining a relationship with both parents minimizes the risk and the bad effects of parental separation.

===== Fostering and adoption =====
Lamb has served as an expert witness in court cases challenging prohibitions against fostering or adoption of children by individuals with same-sex sexual orientations. Lamb's testimony about the importance of parent-child relationships, regardless of family structure, played a crucial role in U.S. litigation on same-sex marriage, including cases considered by the U.S. Supreme Court in 2014.

In 2010, Lamb was to testify in the Perry v. Schwarzenegger trial which challenged the constitutionality of California Proposition 8 against same-sex marriage. Lamb testified that children do not require a male and a female parent to have a stable and healthy life growing up. Lamb stressed that childhood adjustment relied more on the relationships between the parents and the relationships the child has with their parents.

According to trial court in Howard v. Arkansas case in 2004, of the eight expert witnesses testifying at trial, "[t]he most outstanding of the expert witnesses was Dr. Michael Lamb." The trial court explained: "Without a single note to refer to and without any hint of animus or bias, for or against any of the parties, Dr. Lamb succinctly provided full and complete responses to every single question put to him by all counsel and was very frank in responding to inquiries from the court. Of all of the trials in which the court has participated, whether as a member of the bench or of the bar, Dr. Lamb may have been the best example of what an expert witness is supposed to do in a trial, simply provide data to the trier of fact so that the trier of fact can make an informed, impartial decision."

===== Non-traditional family structures =====
Lamb has undertaken significant research on non-traditional families, including same-sex parents. His work has greatly influenced legal decisions addressing same-sex parenting in various US states.

==== Childcare and its effects ====
Lamb's research considered the effects of childcare on young children's social, emotional, and cognitive development. In collaboration with Philip Hwang, Lamb conducted a pioneering longitudinal study examining the effects of different childcare patterns on Swedish children's development. This research highlighted the importance of childcare quality and the role it plays in shaping children's well-being, regardless of family structure. The research helped shape practices in childcare settings, both at home and in institutions.

==== Child abuse and neglect ====
With his late wife, Kathy Sternberg, and other colleagues, Lamb published several papers designed to tease apart the effects of physical child abuse from the effects of poverty and other family stresses. This research was distinguished by the reliance on data and reports from a variety of sources, including the parents, professionals, and the children themselves.

=== Children's testimony ===
During the early 1980s, a series of notorious cases involving allegations of child abuse in childcare settings raised questions about the accuracy and reliability of children’s accounts of abuse. Lamb’s research involved close collaboration with professionals responsible for conducting investigative interviews of alleged abused children in Israel. His work revealed gaps between actual and recommended interviewing practices and highlighted the importance of sensitive and developmentally appropriate interviewing techniques to elicit accurate information from young victims. This stimulated the development of a protocol which would aim to improve the reliability of child witness capabilities, especially in cases of sexual and physical abuse. Lamb and colleagues developed the National Institute of Child Health and Human Development (NICHD) Investigative Interview Protocol. This research-based tool aimed to guide forensic interviewers and improve the quality of child abuse investigations. The Protocol has since been adopted or embraced by investigative agencies in numerous countries, significantly enhancing the investigation of child abuse internationally.

== Awards and recognition ==
Michael E. Lamb has received numerous accolades and honors. He was awarded the James McKeen Cattell Award for Lifetime Contributions to Applied Psychological Research in 2003/2004, and the Distinguished Contribution Award from the American Psychology-Law Society in 2013. From the American Psychological Association, he received the G Stanley Hall Award for Distinguished Contribution to Developmental Psychology (2014), the Award for Distinguished Scientific Applications of Psychology (2015), the Award for Distinguished Senior Career Contributions to Psychology in the Public Interest (2015), and the Urie Bronfenbrenner Award for Lifetime Contribution to Developmental Psychology in the Service of Science and Society (2021). He later received the Award for Distinguished Contributions to Public Policy and Practice in Child Development from the Society for Research in Child Development (2021), the Ned Holstein Shared Parenting Research Lifetime Achievement Award from the National Parents’ Association (2022), and an Award for Distinguished Contributions to 'advancement to the quality of forensic interviewing and improving the lives of children around the world' from the National Children's Advocacy Center (2023). He has also received honorary doctorates from the University of Gothenburg (1995), the University of East Anglia (2006), Abertay University (2015), and Montreal University (2019).

== Selected publications ==
=== Books ===
- Day, Randal D. & Michael E. Lamb. Conceptualizing and Measuring Father Involvement. London: Routledge (2003). ISBN 0-8058-4359-0
- Lamb, Michael E. & others. Tell Me What Happened: Structured Investigative Interviews of Child Victims and Witnesses. New York: Wiley (2008). ISBN 0-470-51866-9
- Lamb, Michael E. The Role of the Father in Child Development. New York: Wiley (2010). ISBN 0-470-40549-X
- Lamb, Michael E. & Debra A. Poole. Investigative Interviews of Children: A Guide for Helping Professionals. Washington, D.C.: American Psychological Association (1998). ISBN 1-55798-684-3

=== Scientific articles ===
- Lamb ME. Does shared parenting by separated parents affect the adjustment of young children?. Journal of Child Custody. 2018 Jan 2;15(1):16-25.
- Braver SL, Lamb ME. Shared parenting after parental separation: The views of 12 experts. Journal of Divorce & Remarriage. 2018 Jul 4;59(5):372-87.

=== Popular press ===
Lamb has contributed to Psychology Today.
