= Susan Ahn Cuddy =

United States Navy officer

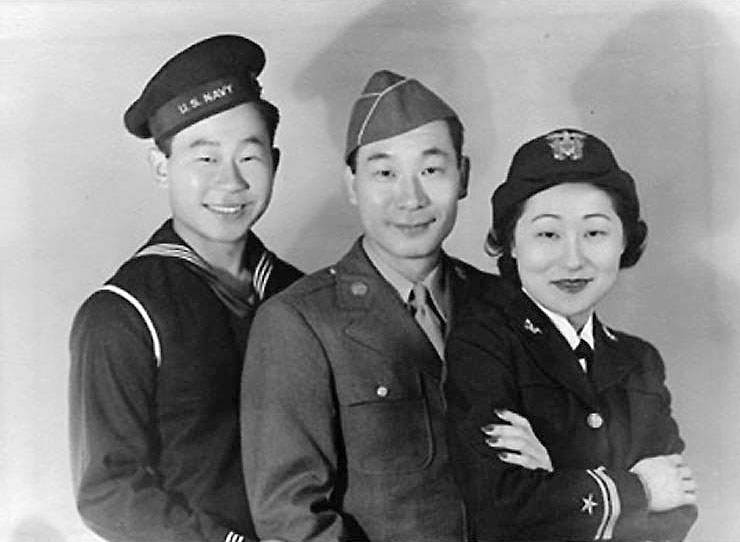
- Ahn siblings, with Ralph on the left, Philip in the center, and Susan on the right
- Born: Susan Ahn; January 16, 1915; Los Angeles, California, U.S.
- Died: June 24, 2015 (aged 100); Los Angeles, California, U.S.
- Education: San Diego State University
- Spouse: Frank Cuddy
- Relatives: Ahn Changho (father); Philip Ahn (brother); Ralph Ahn (brother)
- Military career
- Other work: Library of Congress; National Security Agency
- Military career
- Allegiance: United States
- Branch: United States Navy
- Service years: 1942–1946
- Rank: Lieutenant
- Units: Link Training, Gunnery, Intelligence
- Conflicts: World War II

Susan Ahn Cuddy (Korean: 안수산, Hanja: 安繡山; January 16, 1915 – June 24, 2015) was the first female gunnery officer in the United States Navy. She was the eldest daughter of Korean independence activist Ahn Chang-ho and Helen Ahn, the first married Korean couple to immigrate to the United States in 1902. She joined the Navy in 1942 and served until 1946, reaching the rank of lieutenant. She was the first Asian-American woman to join the U.S. Navy and the first Korean-American in U.S. Naval Intelligence.

== Early life and education ==
Susan Ahn was born in 1915 in Los Angeles, California, as the eldest daughter of Dosan Ahn Changho and Helen Lee. In 1902, her parents were the first Korean married couple to immigrate to the United States. The couple tirelessly worked to liberate their mother country from Japanese colonization; Ahn Chang Ho would eventually give his life to that movement in 1938, after succumbing to injuries from his constant imprisonment and torture by the Japanese.

As the family established themselves, the Ahn house became a haven for many Korean immigrants. The Young Korean Academy (Hung Sa Dan) made its headquarters at the Ahns' residence as a resource center for many Korean immigrants. Many exiled Korean patriots, including Soh Jaipil, the first Korean American citizen, visited the Ahns while they lived at 106 North Figueroa during the Japanese occupation of Korea. The third child of five, and eldest daughter, Susan always said that her parents' sacrifice and dedication to the Korean independence cause played a defining role in her own identity and values.

During her youth, Ahn Cuddy worked for many of Dosan's independence organizations in Los Angeles. She attended Beaudry Elementary, Central Junior High and Belmont High School. She participated in sports such as baseball and field hockey. When she was at Los Angeles City College she was in charge of women's baseball, as well as playing second base. She played for the Bing Crosby's Croonerettes softball team. She had to stop playing to keep her amateur status to play college baseball.

Ahn Cuddy graduated from San Diego State University in 1940 and joined the U.S. Navy in 1942, where she would serve until 1946.

== Career ==
After Japan bombed Pearl Harbor, Susan Ahn Cuddy tried to enlisted in the Women Accepted for Voluntary Emergency Service. Her first attempt was not successful. On her second attempt, she was accepted and sent to U.S. Naval Reserve Midshipmen's School at Smith College in Northampton, Massachusetts. As a WAVES, she became the first Asian American woman in the Navy. This was when anti-Asian sentiment in the country was high, and women were still battling over sexism in the military. She told biographer John Cha, who wrote Willow Tree Shade: The Susan Ahn Cuddy Story (2002), "A lot of people thought that women didn't belong in the service. That made us try harder."

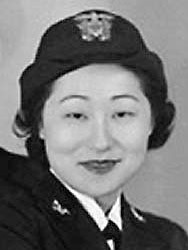
Susan Ahn Cuddy in World War II

Ahn Cuddy felt that her enlistment in the U.S. Navy allowed her to honor her father's legacy of fighting for Korean independence and to fight against the Japanese who, she viewed as "predators". She worked her way up in the Navy, becoming an instructor on Link Trainer flight simulators in 1943, teaching aviators how to maneuver in a simulator cockpit. Later she became the first female aerial gunnery officer in the Navy. In this role, she instructed male recruits in air combat tactics, including the techniques of firing a .50-caliber machine gun in the air.

Ahn Cuddy eventually became a lieutenant and went on to work for U.S. Navy Intelligence and the Library of Congress. She worked for The National Security Agency in Washington, D.C. During the Cold War, she was in charge of a think tank of over 300 agents working in the Russia section. She received a fellowship from the National Security Agency to study at the University of Southern California in 1956. Ahn Cuddy worked on many top secret projects for the Department of Defense and other agencies during her service with the United States government until 1959.

Ahn Cuddy's accomplishments are noted in contemporary accounts.

== Personal life ==
Even in her personal life, Ahn Cuddy proved a trailblazer. In April 1947 she married Chief Petty Officer Francis X. "Frank" Cuddy, an Irish-American. They defied anti-miscegenation laws and wed at the only place that would marry them: a Navy chapel in Washington, D.C. Francis also worked for Navy Intelligence and the NSA. He was a code-breaker and helped the United States free Korea. He helped finance the Ahn family's Moongate restaurant business. In 1959 the couple moved to Los Angeles to raise their children and also in hopes of winning her mother's acceptance of her mixed-race marriage.

The couple had two children, Philip "Flip" and Christine. Ahn Cuddy left the intelligence community in 1959, so she could spend more time with her children. Returning to California, she helped her eldest brother Philip Ahn (the pioneering Asian American actor) and sister Soorah run their popular Chinese restaurant, Moongate, in Panorama City. After Philip died in 1978, Ahn Cuddy largely filled the role of family representative, worked to archive her legendary family's records, and managed the restaurant until 1990.

In 2003, the State Assembly of California of District 28 named Cuddy the Woman of the Year in honor of her commitment to public service. On October 5, 2006, she received the American Courage Award from the Asian American Justice Center in Washington, D.C.

In her elder years, she remained active, speaking at Navy functions and Korean American community events, even campaigning for presidential candidate Barack Obama. A breast cancer survivor, she helped raise money for the cause. She was honored with numerous accolades by government bodies and nonprofits. The Los Angeles County Board of Supervisors designated a "Susan Ahn Cuddy Day". Supervisor Mark Ridley-Thomas, who introduced the declaration, was an especially devoted fan: "These were all firsts as an Asian American woman in a man's world... Anti-Asian sentiment was brazenly prevalent, but that didn't deter Susan Ahn Cuddy—she just knew what her mission was."

== Death and legacy ==
Susan Ahn Cuddy died at her home in Northridge, California, on June 24, 2015. She was 100 years old.

Her life story is the subject of the short biography Willow Tree Shade by John Cha.

== Family ==
- Dosan Ahn Chang Ho, 1878 – 1938 (father)
- Helen Lee (Yi Hye Ryon), 1884 – 1969 (mother)
- Philip Ahn, 1905 – 1978 (brother)
- Philson Ahn, 1912 – 2001 (brother)
- Soorah Ahn Buffum, 1917 - 2016 (sister)
- Ralph Ahn, born 1926 - 2022 (brother)
- Francis Xavier Cuddy, 1917 – 1994 (husband)
- Christine Ahn Cuddy, born 1950 (daughter)
- Philip Ahn Cuddy, born 1955 (son)

== Awards and recognition ==
| Date | Award/recognition | From |
|---|---|---|
| March 11, 1985 | Appreciation of Service | Independence Hall of Korea |
| August 15, 1987 | National Merit Award #4803 | Republic of South Korea from President Chun Doo Hwan |
| June 17, 1992 | Appreciation Award | KAC – 12th Annual National College Leadership Conference |
| August 11, 1992 | Recognition of Service | County of LA Supervisor Mike Antonovich |
| March 1, 1994 | Achievement Award | March First Women's Association USA |
| May 10, 1995 | Appreciation | 1st Annual Korean Culture Night KSA UC Riverside |
| July 28, 1996 | Appreciation | Radio Korea Los Angeles |
| December 14, 2000 | Trailblazer Award | KoreAm Journal |
| December 15, 2000 | Appreciation | March First Women's Association USA |
| May 24, 2001 | Commendation of Service | U.S. Navy Assault Craft Unit 5 Camp Pendleton |
| May 24, 2003 | Woman of the Year | California State Assembly from Assemblyman Mark Ridley-Thomas |
| March 24, 2003 | Congratulations | Governor Arnold Schwarzenegger |
| March 24, 2003 | Congratulations | Lt. Governor Cruz Bustamonte |
| March 24, 2003 | Commendation | Service to Korean American Community from University of Southern California |
| August 8, 2003 | Commendation | The Los Angeles City Council |
| September 11, 2003 | Recognition of Service | State Senator Richard Alarcon |
| December 10, 2003 | Korean American Pioneer | California State Board of Equalization from John Chiang |
| November 18, 2004 | 3 Dosan Post Office | City of Los Angeles Mayor James Hahn |
| November 18, 2004 | Congratulatory Certificate | LA County Supervisor Yvonne Burke |
| November 18, 2004 | Congratulatory Certificate | Governor Arnold Schwarzenegger |
| January 16, 2005 | Birthday greetings | City of LA – home delivered by Tom La Bonge |
| October 5, 2006 | American Courage Award | Asian American Justice Center, Washington, D.C. |
| November 2, 2006 | Recognition of Service | President 1995–2001 from March First Women's Association USA |
| November 17, 2007 | Pioneer Award | Church of Jesus Christ of Latter Day Saints of California |
| August 12, 2007 | Appreciation | Chairperson Korean Independence Day Concert from City of Irvine |
| January 19, 2008 | Pioneer Korean Award | Governor Arnold Schwarzenegger |
| November 7, 2008 | Appreciation | Hung Sa Dan |
| November 11, 2008 | Recognition of Service | City of Malibu Veteran's Day Ceremony from County of LA Supervisor Zev Yaroslavsky |
| January 16, 2009 | Birthday Greetings | County of La Supervisor Mark Ridley-Thomas |
| May 1, 2009 | Leadership Award | Southern California Edison 4th Annual APA Heritage Month Celebration |
| May 1, 2009 | Recognition of Service | California State Senate Gloria Romero |
| May 1, 2009 | Recognition of Service | California State Senate Carol Liu |
| May 1, 2009 | Recognition of Service | California State Controller John Chiang |
| January 16, 2010 | Recognition of 95th Birthday | U.S. Navy |
| January 16, 2011 | Recognition of 95th Birthday | LA County Board of Supervisors |
| January 16, 2012 | Recognition of 95th Birthday | Republic of Korea |
| August 15, 2013 | Veteran of the Game | Los Angeles Dodgers |
| January 16, 2014 | Korean 100th Birthday | Republic of Korea |
| January 16, 2014 | Korean 100th Birthday | LA County Board of Supervisors |
| February 14, 2015 | Recognition of Patriotism | Dosan Memorial Foundation of Korea |
| January 16, 2015 | Recognition of 100th Birthday | LA County Board of Supervisors |
| March 10, 2015 | Susan Ahn Cuddy Day | LA County Board of Supervisors |
| April 10, 2015 | Recognition of Patriotism | Soengnam City Mayor Yi Jae Yong |
| May 9, 2015 | Recognition of Navy Service | U.S. Navy Seabee Museum Port Hueneme |
| May 29, 2015 | Recognition of Navy Service | U.S. Navy Fleet Readiness Center Point Mugu |
| June 6, 2015 | Recognition of Leadership | The Los Angeles City Council |
| June 6, 2015 | Recognition of Contribution | American Cancer Society Relay for Life |

== Publications ==
- Cha, John (2005). Willow tree shade: the Susan Ahn Cuddy story. Korean American Heritage Foundation. p. 315. ISBN 978-89-953916-0-0.
