= Philip Ahn =

American actor (1905–1978)

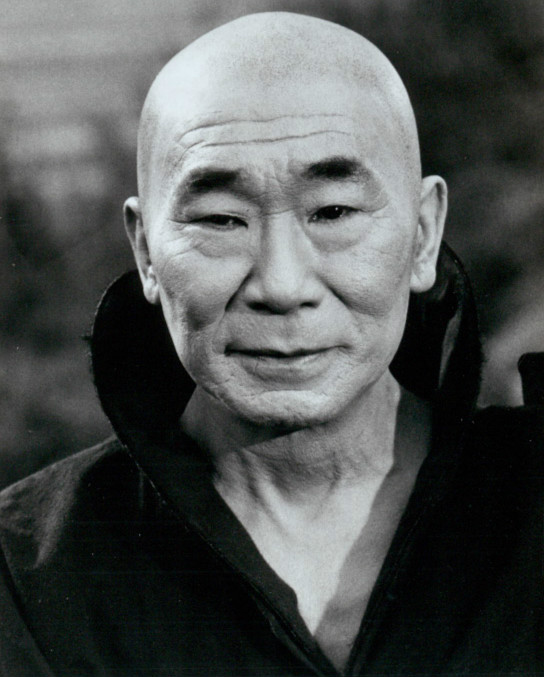
- Ahn in Kung Fu (1975)
- Born: March 29, 1905; Los Angeles, California, U.S.
- Died: February 28, 1978 (aged 72); Los Angeles, California, U.S.
- Resting place: Forest Lawn Memorial Park, Hollywood Hills
- Education: University of Southern California
- Occupations: Actor; activist
- Years active: 1935–1978
- Father: Ahn Changho
- Relatives: Susan Ahn Cuddy (sister); Ralph Ahn (brother)

Korean name
- Hangul: 안필립
- Hanja: 安必立
- RR: An Pilrip
- MR: An P'illip

Philip Ahn (Korean: 안필립; March 29, 1905 – February 28, 1978) was an American actor and activist of Korean descent. With over 180 film and television credits between 1935 and 1978, he was one of the most recognizable and prolific Asian-American character actors of his time. He is regarded as the first Korean American film actor in Hollywood.

The son of Korean independence activist Ahn Changho, Philip Ahn was a longtime advocate for his father's legacy and the Korean-American community, helping to establish memorials to his father in his native Seoul and later arranging for his remains to be buried there.

== Early life and education ==
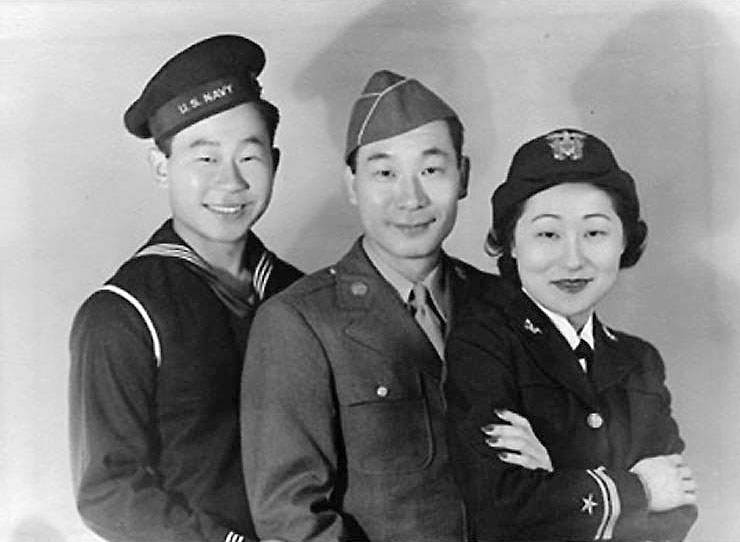
Philip Ahn (middle) and his siblings, Ralph Ahn and Susan Ahn, in 1942

Ahn was born in the Highland Park neighborhood of Los Angeles, California, on March 29, 1905. His parents, Ahn Changho (도산 안창호) and Yi Hyeryon (이혜련), were both Korean emigrants who had moved to the United States in 1902, making him the first American citizen born to two Korean parents in the United States. His father Dosan was a well-known educator and an activist for Korean independence while Korea was under Japanese rule; he moved to the U.S. to seek better educational opportunities. He became an informal ambassador to the Korean-American immigrant community in California and became one of its first leaders, founding the Mutual Assistance Society (Kongrip Hyophoe/공립협회), the first Korean political organization in America.

When he was in high school, Ahn visited the set of the film The Thief of Bagdad where he met Douglas Fairbanks. Fairbanks offered him a screen test, followed by a part in the movie. However, his mother told him, "No son of mine is going to get mixed up with those awful people."

Ahn graduated from high school in 1923 and went to work in the rice fields around Colusa, California. The land was owned by the Hung Sa Dan, or Young Korean Academy, a Korean independence movement that trained Koreans to become leaders of their country once it was free from Japanese rule. Since Koreans could not own land in California, the Academy put the property in Ahn's name. Unfortunately, the rice crops failed because of heavy rains, and Ahn found himself deeply in debt. He went to work as an elevator operator in Los Angeles to pay back the debt and help support his family.

It was not until 1934 that he could afford to attend the University of Southern California. His father told him if he really wanted to be an actor, he had to be the best actor he could and convinced him to take acting and cinematography courses. While still a student, he appeared in a stage production of Merrily We Roll Along, which toured the western United States.

Ahn served as president of the USC Cosmopolitan Club, was chairman of the All University Committee on International Relations and was assistant to the dean of male students as advisor for foreign student affairs. He organized visits by foreign dignitaries, including Princess Der Ling of China, Indian journalist Diwan Chaman Lall and archeologist-explorer Robert B. Stacey-Judd. After completing his second year, however, Ahn dropped out to act full-time.

== Career ==
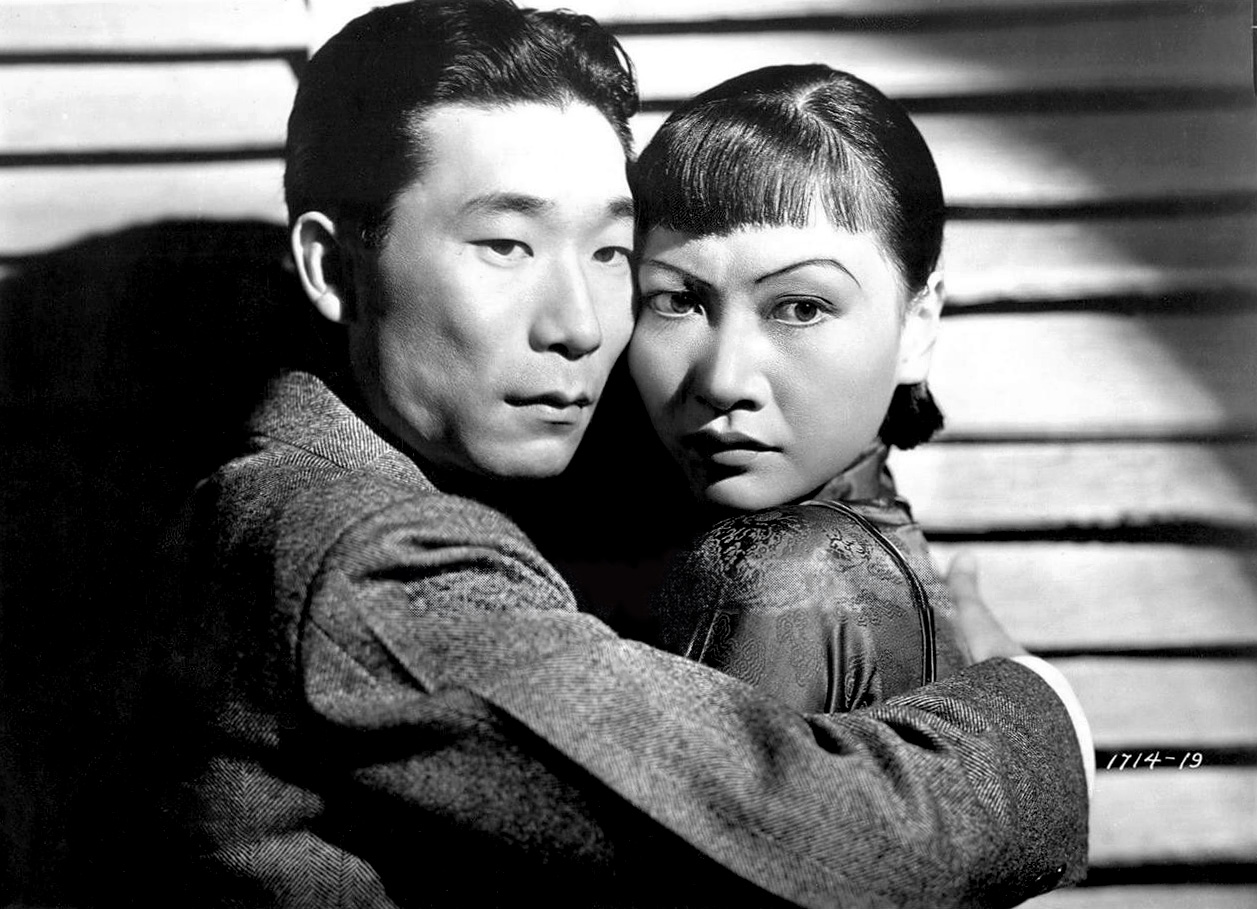
Ahn and Anna May Wong in Daughter of Shanghai

Ahn's first film was A Scream in the Night in 1935. He appeared in the Bing Crosby film Anything Goes, though the director Lewis Milestone had initially rejected him because his English was too good for the part. His first credited roles came in 1936 in The General Died at Dawn and Stowaway, opposite Shirley Temple. He starred opposite Anna May Wong in Daughter of Shanghai (1937) and King of Chinatown (1939), becoming the first self-represented on-screen Asian American romantic couple of sound-era Hollywood cinema.

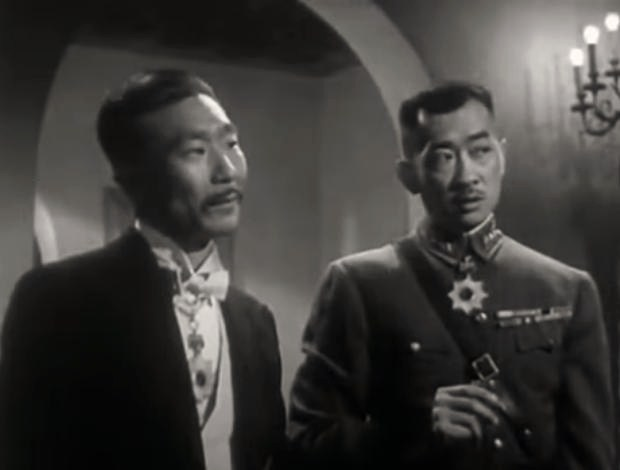
Ahn and Richard Loo in Women in the Night

During World War II, Ahn often played Japanese villains in war films. Mistakenly thought to be Japanese, he received several death threats. He was frequently cast in these roles opposite Chinese-American actor Richard Loo. He enlisted in the U.S. Army and served in the Special Services division as an entertainer. He was discharged early because of an injured ankle and returned to making films.

Ahn's role as a conflicted Ilbongye Hangugin (Korean of Japanese descent) doctor in the 1945 Pearl Buck adaptation China Sky is notable as one of the first depictions of a Korean character in a major Hollywood film.

Ahn appeared in Love Is a Many-Splendored Thing, Around the World in Eighty Days, Thoroughly Modern Millie and Paradise, Hawaiian Style, with Elvis Presley. He played Korean characters in Korean War movies such as Battle Circus (1953) and Battle Hymn (1956).

After traveling to South Korea in the 1950s, Ahn considered emigrating there and acting in Korean films, but decided against it due to his unusual idiolect. Having learned Korean mostly from his mother, who was from the Northern part of the peninsula and had left Korea in the early 1900s, Ahn and his siblings spoke with a prominent North Korean accent and antiquated diction and grammar.

=== Television roles ===
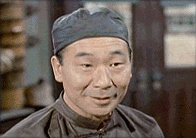
Ahn in Bonanza

In 1952, Ahn made his television debut on the Schlitz Playhouse, on which he would make three additional appearances. Ahn would also be cast in four episodes of ABC's Adventures in Paradise, four episodes of the ABC/Warner Brothers crime drama Hawaiian Eye, and the CBS crime drama Hawaii Five-O. He made three appearances each on Crossroads, Bonanza, and M*A*S*H. He would also appear in two television movies.

Ahn's most notable television role was as "Master Kan" on the television series Kung Fu (1972). A Presbyterian, Ahn felt that the Taoist homilies his character quoted did not contradict his own religious faith.

=== Restaurant business ===
In 1954, Ahn opened a Chinese restaurant with his sister Soorah. Phil Ahn's Moongate Restaurant was one of the first Chinese restaurants in Panorama City, in the San Fernando Valley, and lasted for more than thirty years, before closing in 1990.

== Personal life ==
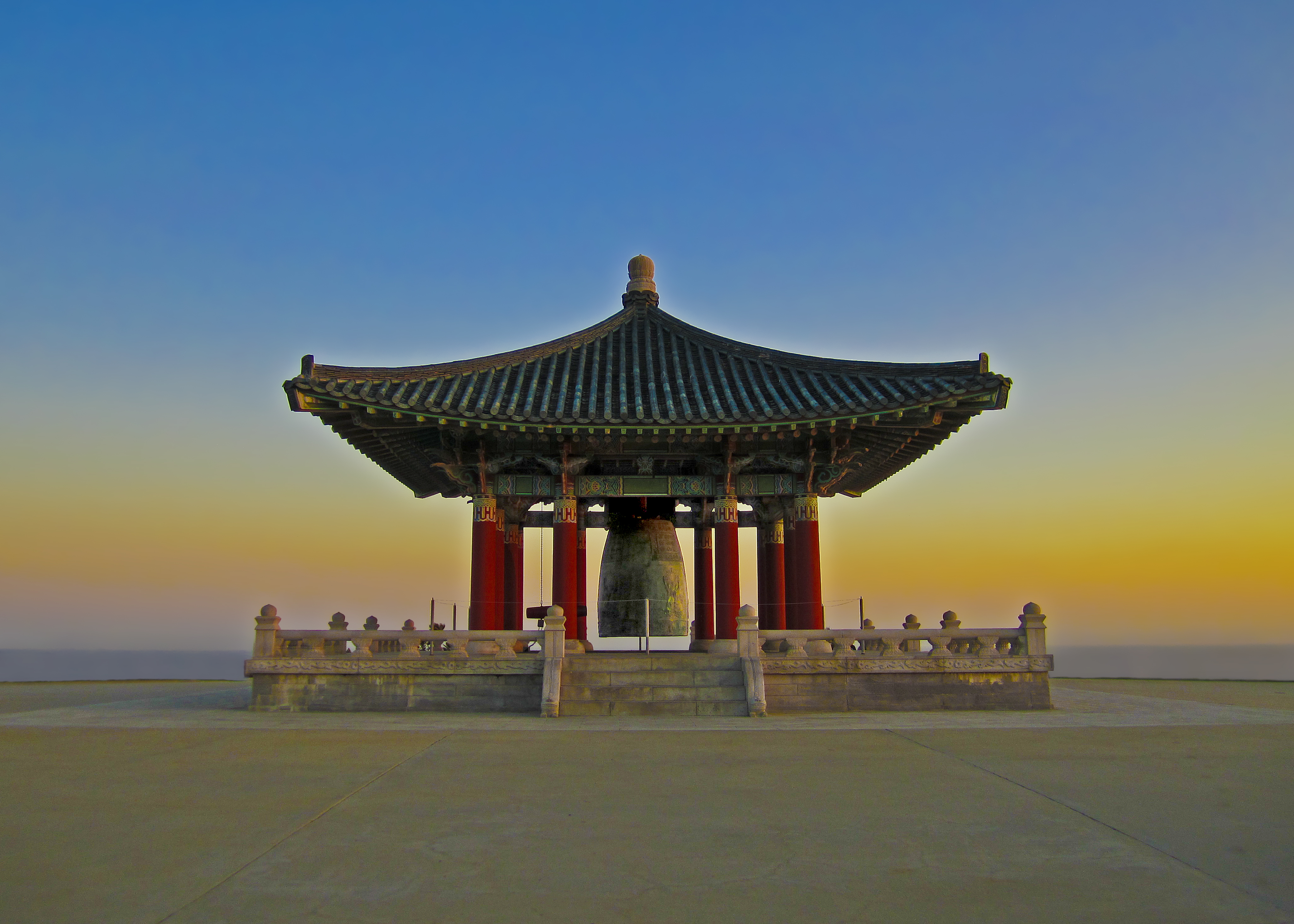
The Korean Bell of Friendship in San Pedro

Ahn was actively involved in the Korean community of Los Angeles. He worked to make Los Angeles a sister city of Busan, South Korea. He also helped to bring the Korean Bell of Friendship to San Pedro, California, which went on to appear in many films. He served for 20 years as honorary mayor of Panorama City, California. He lived at house that Kurt Cobain and Courtney Love later lived in.

He worked to have his father and mother buried together in Seoul. His father had been buried far from the city because the Japanese hoped to downplay his independence activism. His mother had died in California. They had not seen each other from the time Dosan returned to Korea in 1926, before the birth of his youngest son. Ahn worked with the South Korean government to establish a park to honor his father and was able to have his parents buried there.

Ahn's younger brother Philson had a minor acting career, and was best known as "Prince Tallen" in the twelve-episode serial Buck Rogers. Because of their similar first names, the two are sometimes conflated. His sister Susan was the first female gunnery officer in the United States Navy, eventually rising to the rank of Lieutenant and working for both Naval Intelligence and the fledgling National Security Agency.

In 1968, Ahn made a USO tour of South Vietnam, visiting both American and South Korean troops in the Vietnam War.

=== Death ===
Ahn died on February 28, 1978, due to complications from surgery for lung cancer. His biopsy operation had resulted in infection with pneumonia. He is buried in the Courts of Remembrance, Forest Lawn Hollywood Hills in Los Angeles.

== Legacy ==
Ahn remains a seminal figure in Asian-American and Korean-American representation in Hollywood. In the 1940s and 1950s, Korea was a relatively obscure region to most Americans, recognized politically as a colony of Japan and little else. Not only was Ahn one of the first Korean-American actors to work in the American film industry, but he was also one of the first actors to portray Korean characters in American films.

Hye Seung Chung, an associate professor of film and media studies at Colorado State University, writes of Ahn that he “remains a true pioneer, one of the few performers of Asian descent to survive the racist casting politics of studio-era filmmaking and make a transition to the Television Age. Although Ahn played Korean characters in only a handful of Korean War films and television episodes, he was an important figure in Korean American history.”

== Tributes ==
In 1984, Ahn was posthumously inducted into the Hollywood Walk of Fame with a motion pictures star for his contributions to the film industry. His star is located at 6211 Hollywood Boulevard. He was the first Korean American film actor to receive a star on the Hollywood Walk of Fame.

== Filmography ==
- Desirable (1934) as Chinese waiter (uncredited)
- Shanghai (1935) as Servant (uncredited)
- A Scream in the Night (1935) as Wu Ting (as Philip Ann)
- Anything Goes (1936) as Ling (uncredited)
- Klondike Annie (1936) as Wing (uncredited)
- The General Died at Dawn (1936) as Oxford
- Stowaway (1936) as Sun Lo, Barbara's friend in Sanchow
- Counterfeit Lady (1936) as Maine (uncredited)
- The Good Earth (1937) as Captain in revolutionary army (uncredited)
- China Passage (1937) as Dr. Fang Tu (as Phillip Ahn)
- I Promise to Pay (1937) as Taka (uncredited)
- Roaring Timber (1937) as Crooner
- Think Fast, Mr. Moto (1937) as Switchboard operator (uncredited)
- Something to Sing About (1937) as Ito, Terry's man-servant
- Tex Rides with the Boy Scouts (1937) as Sing Fung, laundry man
- Daughter of Shanghai (1937) as Kim Lee
- Thank You, Mr. Moto (1937) as Prince Chung
- Hawaii Calls (1938) as Julius
- Red Barry (1938) as Hong Kong Cholly
- Charlie Chan in Honolulu (1938) as Wing Foo
- North of Shanghai (1939) as Chinese doctor
- King of Chinatown (1939) as Robert 'Bob' Li
- Panama Patrol (1939) as Suri
- Island of Lost Men (1939) as Sam Ring (uncredited)
- Disputed Passage (1939) as Dr. Fung
- Barricade (1939) as Col. Wai Kang
- The Shadow (1940, serial) as Wu Yung (uncredited)
- Drums of Fu Manchu (1940, serial) as Dr. Chang (Chapter 4 The Pendulum of Doom) (uncredited)
- They Met in Bombay (1941) as Japanese officer (uncredited)
- Passage from Hong Kong (1941) as Steamship official (uncredited)
- A Yank on the Burma Road (1942) as Dr. Franklin Ling (as Phillip Ahn)
- Ship Ahoy (1942) as Koro Sumo (uncredited)
- The Tuttles of Tahiti (1942) as Emily's servant (uncredited)
- Let's Get Tough! (1942) as Joe Matsui (as Phil Ahn)
- Submarine Raider (1942) as 1st officer Kawakami
- Across the Pacific (1942) as Informer inside theatre (uncredited)
- China Girl (1942) as Dr. Kai Young
- The Adventures of Smilin' Jack (1943, Serial) as Wu Tan
- The Amazing Mrs. Holliday (1943) as Major Ching (uncredited)
- They Got Me Covered (1943) as Nichimuro
- Don Winslow of the Coast Guard (1943) as Hirota
- China (1943) as Lin Cho, First Brother
- Behind the Rising Sun (1943) as Japanese officer murdering Takahashi (uncredited)
- The Man from Down Under (1943) as English speaking Japanese aviator (uncredited)
- Around the World (1943) as Foo (uncredited)
- December 7 (1943) as Shinto priest (uncredited)
- The Purple Heart (1944) as Saburo Goto (uncredited)
- The Story of Dr. Wassell (1944) as Ping
- Dragon Seed (1944) as Leader of city people (uncredited)
- The Keys of the Kingdom (1944) as Mr. Pao, envoy for Mr. Chia
- Forever Yours (1945) as Chinese Man (uncredited)
- Betrayal from the East (1945) as Kato
- God is My Co-Pilot (1945) Hong Kong radio announcer (uncredited)
- China Sky (1945) as Dr. Kim
- Blood on the Sun (1945) as Secret Police Captain Yomamoto (uncredited)
- China's Little Devils (1945) as Farmer
- Back to Bataan (1945) as Col. Coroki
- They Were Expendable (1945) as Army orderly (uncredited)
- Singapore (1947) as Jimmy – bartender (uncredited)
- The Chinese Ring (1947) as Captain Kong
- Intrigue (1947) as Louie Chin (as Phillip Ahn)
- Women in the Night (1948) as Prof. Kunioshi (as Phillip Ahn)
- The Miracle of the Bells (1948) as Ming Gow
- Saigon (1948) as Boss merchant (uncredited)
- The Cobra Strikes (1948) as Kasim – houseboy
- The Creeper (1948) as Ah Wong – restaurant owner
- Rogues' Regiment (1948) as Tran Duy Gian
- State Department: File 649 (1949) as Col. Aram
- Boston Blackie's Chinese Venture (1949) as Wong Chung Shee
- Impact (1949) as Ah Sing
- The Sickle or the Cross (1949) as Chinese official
- The Gal Who Took the West (1949) as Party guest (uncredited)
- The Big Hangover (1950) as Dr. Lee
- The Glass Menagerie (1950) as Sailor (uncredited)
- Halls of Montezuma (1950) as Nomura (alias of Maj. Kenji Matsuoda)
- I Was an American Spy (1950) as Capt. Arito
- China Corsair (1951) as Wong San
- Secrets of Monte Carlo (1951) as Wong
- Japanese War Bride (1952) as Eitaro Shimizu
- Macao (1952) as Itzumi
- Red Snow (film) (1952) as Tuglu – the spy (as Phillip Ahn)
- Battle Zone (1952) as South Korean guerilla leader
- Target Hong Kong (1953) as Sin How
- Battle Circus (1953) as Korean prisoner with hand grenade
- Fair Wind to Java (1953) as Gusti
- China Venture (1953) as Adm. Amara
- His Majesty O'Keefe (1954) as Sien Tang, dentist and O'Keefe's partner
- Hell's Half Acre (1954) as Roger Kong
- The Shanghai Story (1954) as Major Ling Wu
- Jump Into Hell (1955) as Chinese POW lieutenant (uncredited)
- Love Is a Many-Splendored Thing (1955) as Third uncle
- The Left Hand of God (1955) as Jan Teng
- Around the World in Eighty Days (1956) as Hong Kong citizen (uncredited)
- Battle Hymn (1957) as Old man, Lun-Wa
- The Way to the Gold (1957) as Mr. Ding, café owner
- Hong Kong Confidential (1958) as Tan Chung
- Yesterday's Enemy (1959) as Yamazaki
- Never So Few (1959) as Nautaung, leader of the Kachin
- The Great Imposter (1961) as Capt. Hun Kim
- One Eyed Jacks (1961) as Uncle
- Confessions of an Opium Eater (1962) as Ching Foon
- A Girl Named Tamiko (1962) as Akiba
- Diamond Head (1963) as Mr. Immacona
- Shock Corridor (1963) as Dr. Fong
- Paradise, Hawaiian Style (1966) as Moki Kaimana
- Thoroughly Modern Millie (1967) as Tea, Muzzy's head butler
- The Karate Killers (1967) as Sazami Kyushu (archive footage)
- The World's Greatest Athlete (1973) as Old Chinaman
- Voodoo Heartbeat (1973) as Mao Tse Tung
- Jonathan Livingston Seagull (1973) as Chang (voice)

== Television ==
- Schlitz Playhouse 4 episodes (Souvenir from Singapore) (1952) (Murder in Paradise) (1955) (Dealer's Choice) (1956) (East of the Moon) (1958)
- Fireside Theatre 1 episode (The Traitor) (1953)
- Captain Midnight 1 episode (Sutoc in The Arctic Avalanche) (1955)
- TV Reader's Digest 2 episodes (Mr. Pak – interpreter in Mr. Pak Takes Over) (1955) (Wang Tsu in The Brainwashing of John Hayes) (1955)
- Crossroads 3 episodes (Major in The Good Thief) (1955) (Lung Chan in Chinese Checkers) (1955) (Ah Hiu in Calvary in China) (1956)
- Four Star Playhouse 2 episodes (Chang in Stuffed Shirt) (1955) (Capt. Shu Gat in Wall of Bamboo) (1956)
- Jungle Jim 1 episode (Karja in Power of Darkness) (1956)
- The Adventures of Wild Bill Hickok 1 episode (Ho San in Jingles Wins a Friend) (1956)
- Hey, Jeannie! 1 episode (Wong in The Proprietor) (1956)
- Navy Log 2 episodes (General Chen in Operation Typewriter) (1956) (Korean soldier in The Commander and the Kid) (1957)
- The New Adventures of Charlie Chan 1 episode (Mr. Kim in The Secret of the Sea) (1957)
- The Alcoa Hour 1 episode (Major Pak in The Last Train to Pusan) (1957)
- Telephone Time 1 episode (Patriarch in Pit-a-Pit) (1957)
- Dragnet 1 episode (Gerald Quon in The Big Jade) (1958)
- The Eve Arden Show 1 episode (Liza Meets Young Korea) (1958)
- The Californians 1 episode (Choo in Death by Proxy) (1958)
- Jefferson Drum 1 episode (Charles Wong in The Cheater) (1958)
- Lawman 1 episode (Wong in The Intruders) (1958)
- Have Gun, Will Travel 2 episodes (W. Chung in Hey Boy's Revenge) (1958) (Hoo Yee in The Hatchet Man) (1960)
- The Adventures of Rin Tin Tin 1 episode (Hop Sing in The Ming Vase) (1959)
- Alcoa Presents: One Step Beyond 1 episode (Song in The Dead Part of the House) (1959)
- Alcoa Theatre 1 episode (Boo Soon in Day the Devil Hid) (1959)
- General Electric Theatre 1 episode (Rahm Sing in The House of Truth) (1959)
- Adventures in Paradise 4 episodes (Ling in The Bamboo Curtain) (1959) (Ling Wan in One Little Pearl) (1960) (Reverend Yen in Command at Sea) (1961) (Mr. Chee in Build My Gallows Low) (1962)
- The Islanders 1 episode (Governor Galli in The Generous Politician) (1960)
- The Gale Storm Show 1 episode (Lee Sing in Made in Hong Kong) (1960)
- Tightrope (TV series) 1 episode (Quon Lee in The Chinese Pendant) (1960)
- The Rebel 1 episode (Quong Lee in Blind Marriage) (1960)
- Wanted: Dead or Alive 1 episode (Tom Wing in Pay-Off at Pinto) (1960)
- Richard Diamond, Private Detective 1 episode (East of Danger) (1960)
- Checkmate 1 episode (Mr. Lu in Face in the Window) (1960)
- The Brothers Brannagan 1 episode (Howard Mai in The Key of Jade) (1960)
- Pete and Gladys 1 episode (Mr. Suki in No Man is Japan) (1960)
- Mr. Garlund 2 episodes (Po Chang in The X-27 and To Double, Double Vamp) (1960)
- Hawaiian Eye 4 episodes (Mr. Kwong in The Lady's Not for Traveling) (1960) (Mr. Sun in The Blue Goddess) (1960) (Li in The Manchu Formula) (1961) (Florist in The Broken Thread) (1962)
- Bonanza 3 episodes (Mr. Lee Chang in The Fear Merchants) (1960) (Dr. Kam Lee in Day of the Dragon) (1961) (Wang Sai in A Pink Cloud Comes From Old Cathay) (1964)
- Hong Kong 2 episodes (Feng in The Dragon Cup) (1960) (Hyung in Lady Godiva) (1961)
- Alcoa Premiere 1 episode (Chinese major in The Fortress) (1961)
- Follow the Sun 2 episodes (Dr. Kwai in Cry Fraud) (1961) (Han Lee in Ghost Story) (as Phillip Ahn) (1962)
- The New Breed 1 episode (Joe Ohoshi in Echoes of Hate) (1962)
- Mr. Smith Goes to Washington 1 episode (The Fork in the Road) (1962)
- Perry Mason 1 episode (James Wong in The Case of the Weary Watchdog) (1962)
- Ensign O'Toole 1 episode (Low Kong in Operation Intrigue) (1963)
- The Third Man 1 episode (Easy One Seng in A Calculated Risk) (1963)
- Stoney Burke 1 episode (Zen Master in The Weapons Man) (as Phillip Ahn) (1963)
- Make Room for Daddy 1 episode (Wong Chow, the launderer in Sense of Humor) (1964)
- The Rogues 1 episode (Magician in Our Men in Marawat) (1965)
- I Spy 2 episodes (Charlie Huan in Carry Me Back to Old Tsing-Tao) (1965) (Tu Po in An American Empress) (1967)
- The Wild Wild West 1 episode (Quong Chu in The Night the Dragon Screamed) (1966)
- The F.B.I. 2 episodes (Police Chief Henry Nakamura in The Hiding Place) (1966) (Mr. Kwong in Dark Journey) (1972)
- The Man from U.N.C.L.E 2 episodes (High Lama of Ghupat in The Abominable Snowman Affair) (1966) (Dr. Sazami Kyushu in The Five Daughters Affair: Part II) (1967)
- The Time Tunnel 1 episode (Dr. Nakamura in Kill Two By Two) (1967)
- Laredo 1 episode (Capt. Wong Lee in The Bitter Yen of General Ti) (1967)
- The Girl from U.N.C.L.E. 1 episode (Wu in The Fountain of Youth Affair) (1967)
- Hawaii Five-O 4 episodes (Attorney General in Pilot) (1968) (Attorney General in Cocoon: Part I) (1969) (Quon Li in Sweet Terror) (1969) (Lin Mai-Lu in Journey Out of Limbo) (1972)
- The Big Valley 1 episode (Chen Yu in The Emperor of Rice) (1968)
- My Three Sons 1 episode (Uncle George Wong in Honorable Guest) (1968)
- Mannix 1 episode (Mr. Rhee in Shadow of a Man) (1969)
- Mission: Impossible 1 episode (Dr. Liu in Doomsday) (1969)
- It Takes a Thief 1 episode (Owner in Mad in Japan) (1969)
- Ironside 1 episode (Nam Feng in Love My Enemy) (1969)
- The Streets of San Francisco 1 episode (Mr. Wu in The Year of the Locusts) (1972)
- Love, American Style 1 episode (Chow Lee in segment Love and the Golden Worm) (1974)
- The Magician 1 episode (Chao Liu in The Illusion of the Lost Dragon) (1974)
- Judgment: The Court Martial of the Tiger of Malaya – General Yamashita (TV movie) (1974)
- Kung Fu 39 episodes (Master Kan) (1972–1975)
- The Killer Who Wouldn't Die (TV movie) Soong (as Phillip Ahn) (1976)
- M*A*S*H 3 episodes (The father in Hawkeye) (1976) (Korean grandfather in Exorcism) (1976) (Mr. Kim in Change Day) (as Phillip Ahn) (1977)
- Sanford and Son 1 episode (Chinese man in The Defiant One) (1977)
- Wonder Woman 1 episode (Colonel Minh in The Man Who Made Volcanoes) (1977)
- Police Woman 2 episodes (Quon in Deadline: Death) (1977) (Mr. Won in The Human Rights of Tiki Kim) (1978)
- Switch 1 episode (Charlie Kuang in The Tong) (1978)

== See also ==
- History of the Korean Americans in Los Angeles
- List of actors with Hollywood Walk of Fame motion picture stars
