= Confessions of an Opium Eater =

1962 film

- Film poster
- Directed by: Albert Zugsmith
- Written by: Seton I. Miller
- Screenplay by: Robert Hill (film writer)
- Based on: Confessions of an English Opium-Eater; 1821 story in London Magazine by Thomas De Quincey
- Produced by: Albert Zugsmith
- Starring: Vincent Price; Linda Ho; Richard Loo; Philip Ahn
- Narrated by: Vincent Price
- Cinematography: Joseph F. Biroc
- Edited by: Robert S. Eisen; Roy V. Livingston; Edward Curtiss
- Music by: Albert Glasser
- Production company: Photoplay
- Distributed by: Allied Artists Pictures
- Release date: June 20, 1962 (United States)
- Running time: 85 minutes
- Country: United States
- Language: English

Confessions of an Opium Eater (also known as Souls for Sale, Secrets of a Soul and Evils of Chinatown) is a 1962 American crime film directed and produced by Albert Zugsmith and starring Vincent Price as Gilbert de Quincey, a nineteenth-century adventurer who becomes involved in a tong war in San Francisco. It was written by Seton I. Miller and Robert Hill, loosely based on the 1821 autobiographical novel Confessions of an English Opium-Eater by Thomas De Quincey.

Price also narrated the film, whose evocative cinematography resembles a nightmare. The film was something of a departure for Price; the prolific actor never performed another role that involved so much physical action.

== Plot ==
In 1902, adventurer Gilbert De Quincey, a descendant of Thomas De Quincey, is hired by the editor of a Chinese newspaper to stop auctions of trafficked Chinese women to be the brides of Chinese men resident in the United States. The community is split down the middle between those feeling the traditional practice is the only way for overseas Chinese to obtain brides, and those who regard the practise as indecent.

== Cast ==
- Vincent Price as Gilbert De Quincey
- Linda Ho as Ruby Low
- Richard Loo as George Wah
- June Kyoto Lu as Lotus (as June Kim)
- Philip Ahn as Ching Foon
- Yvonne Moray as midget girl with sing-sing voice
- Caroline Kido as Lo Tsen
- Terence De Marney as Englishman in opium den

== Production ==
In December 1958 William Castle announced he would make the film for Allied Artists in Japan at a budget of $1 million.

By January 1961 the film was being made by producer Albert Zugsmith. Zugsmith offered the film to Douglas Sirk to direct - the two men had made Written on the Wind together - and Sirk turned it down.

Filming began October 1961.

== Release ==
After circulating for years as a bootleg, it was released on DVD as part of the Warner Archive Collection in 2012.

== Reception ==
The Monthly Film Bulletin wrote: "This crude piece of claptrap has to be seen to be believed: it is a hotchpotch of Chinatown melodrama (circa 1920 vintage) with rival tongs, starved girls captive in cages, secret panels, sliding doors, sewer escape routes, opium dens and nightmares, with the hero described as a descendant of the great De Quincey. Presentation is scrappy and disordered. Flowery, quasi-philosophic dialogue sprinkled with Chinese proverbs hardly helps an attempt at the bizarre, which emerges less successfully in the opium-nightmare sequence than in the semi-comic performance of a Chinese midget. On the credit side should be mentioned a few scenes distinguished by remarkable art direction, though it comes as something of a shock to find Lourié working on a film of this calibre. Not even Vincent Price is in his element, for he plays his impossible role straight and almost disinterestedly."

Slant Magazine wrote: "Robert Hill’s pulpy script makes Thomas De Quincey’s philosophical rumblings sound less lugubrious than they often are and certainly puts to shame anything posing as serious philosophical thought in the Matrix films. ... there’s plenty of talk in the film about sparring dualities, namely dreams versus nightmares and pessimism versus optimism. Every choice is a road not taken. And every reality may be little more than a product of a pipe dream, and not unlike this beautiful and often bizarre little gem."

In 1998, Jonathan Rosenbaum of the Chicago Reader included the film in his unranked list of the best American films not included on the AFI Top 100.

== See also ==
- List of American films of 1962
