= Ross Thompson (professor) =

American research psychologist (born 1954)

Ross A. Thompson
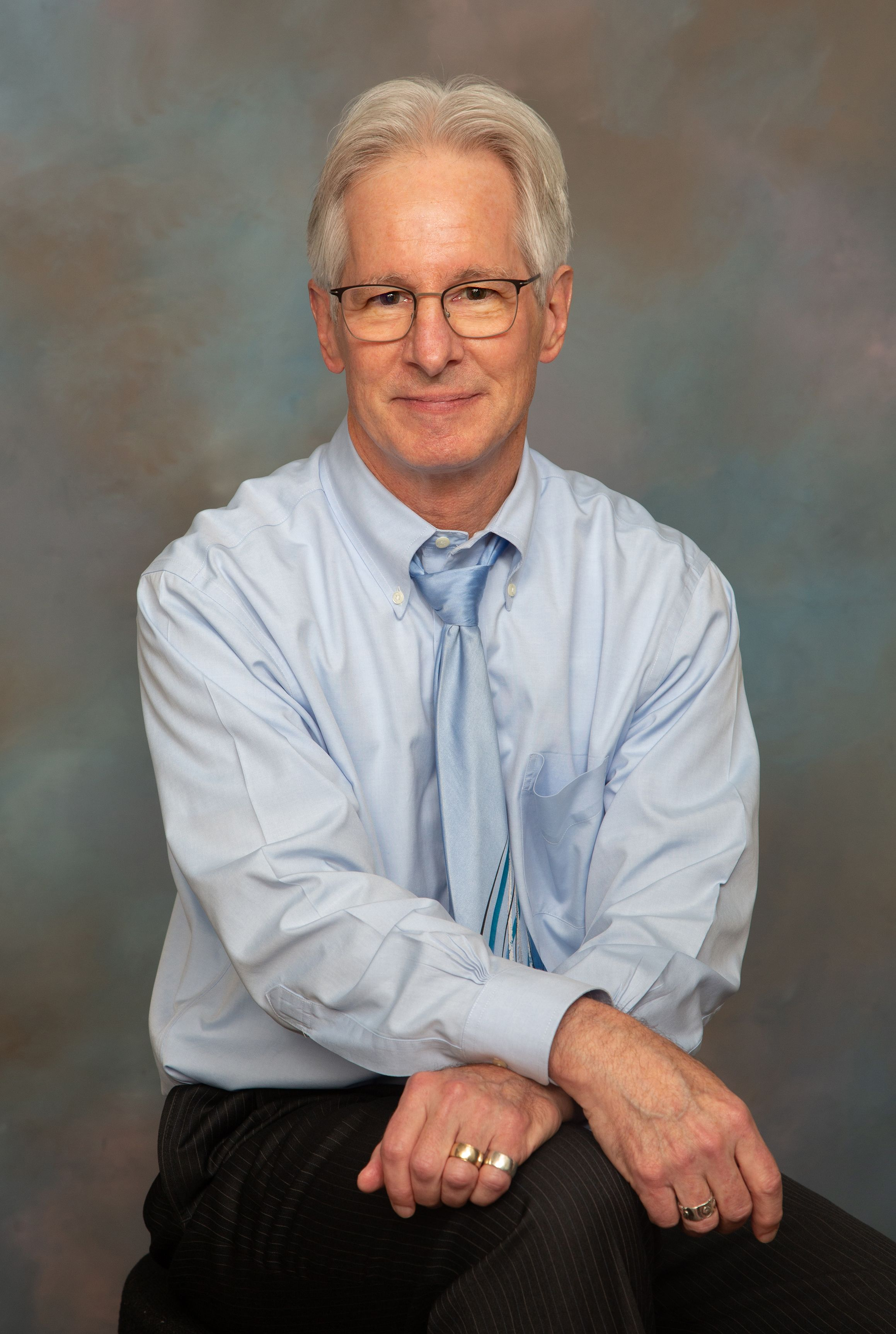
- Born: Ross Allen Thompson; 1954/08/05; Madison, Wisconsin
- Occupations: Scientific Career: Developmental psychology, Developmental science and public policy

Academic background
- Education: Ph.D. in Developmental Psychology, 1981, University of Michigan; B. A. in Psychology, 1976, Occidental College

Academic work
- Institutions: University of Nebraska–Lincoln; University of California, Davis

Ross A. Thompson is an American author and research psychologist. He is Distinguished Professor Emeritus of psychology at the University of California, Davis, and is director of the Social & Emotional Development Lab. Thompson is known for his work on the psychological development of young children. His influences on developmental research and public policy were recognized in the Urie Bronfenbrenner Award for Lifetime Contribution to Developmental Psychology in the Service of Science and Society in 2018 by the American Psychological Association, the Ann L. Brown Award for Excellence in Developmental Research in 2007. Thompson received the Distinguished Lifetime Achievement from Zero to Three in 2023.

== Early life and education ==
Thompson grew up in Wisconsin and California. He earned a Bachelor of Arts (magna cum laude) in psychology from Occidental College in 1976. After graduation, he attended the University of Michigan to study moral development and empathy with Martin Hoffman on an NSF Graduate Fellowship. In 1977, after Hoffman departed from Michigan, Thompson worked with Michael Lamb when he came to Michigan in 1978 until Lamb's departure in 1980.

During his graduate studies, Thompson joined the Bush Program in Child Development and Social Policy at Michigan, one of a small consortium of university-based graduate training programs to prepare Ph.D. developmental scientists to contribute to public policy. He also worked at the Child Development Project, a pioneering clinical and research unit focused on understanding and treating very early mental health problems. Thompson received a master's degree in 1979 and a Ph.D. in developmental psychology in 1981.

== Career ==
In 1981, he joined the faculty of the Department of Psychology at the University of Nebraska–Lincoln. While at Nebraska, he founded the graduate program in developmental psychology and was a faculty member of the Law-Psychology Program. He served as associate director of the Center on Children, Families, and the Law and had an appointment at the College of Law, where he taught on children and the law. Thompson was a Visiting Scientist at the Max Planck Institute for Human Development and Education in (West) Berlin in 1985, studying life-span developmental psychology with Paul Baltes. In 1989, he was a Harris Visiting professor at the University of Chicago. In 2000, Thompson was appointed Carl A. Happold Distinguished Professor of Psychology at the University of Nebraska–Lincoln.

In 1984, Thompson was a Fellow at the Summer Institute on Individual Development and Social Change at the Center for Advanced Study in the Behavioral Sciences at Stanford University. Later, at Stanford, his joint visiting appointments in the Department of Psychology and the Law School as a Senior NIMH Fellow in Law and Psychology (1989–1990) provided him with further opportunities to develop integrative ideas bridging developmental psychology and family policy.

In 2003, Thompson moved to the University of California, Davis, to help build its graduate program in developmental psychology. He established and directs the Social and Emotional Development Lab. He contributed to creating the university's Center for Poverty and Inequality Research and served on its executive committee for many years. He was a founding member of the National Scientific Council on the Developing Child.

In 2005, Thompson joined ZERO TO THREE, a national nonprofit devoted to the healthy development of young children and their families, as a member of its board of directors and has chaired many committees of the board. He served as president of the board of directors from 2015 to 2018.

Thompson became a Fellow of the Association for Psychological Science in 2003 and the American Psychological Association in 2004.

He serves on the boards of Buffett Early Childhood Institute and the Stein Early Childhood Development Fund. He was a member of the National Academy of Sciences committee that produced the influential report, From Neurons to Neighborhoods: The Science of Early Childhood Development (National Academies Press, 2000), and served on a second NAS committee that wrote Transforming the Workforce for Children Birth Through Age 8: A Unifying Foundation (National Academies Press, 2015). Thompson also regularly consults with PBS KIDS and WGBH-Boston on the development of social-emotional programming for young children.

Thompson has served three times as Associate Editor of Child Development, the flagship journal of the Society for Research in Child Development and also has been a guest editor of several other research journals. He has testified before Congress and state legislatures, lectured internationally, given many keynote speeches and named lectureships, and consulted with public agencies, nonprofits, and private foundations. He has co-authored several best-selling textbooks with Kathleen Berger, edited the McGraw-Hill Series in Developmental Psychology, and written over 300 papers related to his work, including commissioned papers, many of which have been reprinted and translated.

== Research ==
His research focuses on early parent-child relationships, the development of emotion understanding and emotion regulation, early moral development, and self-understanding in young children.

He also works on the applications of developmental science to public policy problems, including early childhood mental health, child poverty, the prevention of child maltreatment, and early education. His work integrates an understanding of the developing brain with early experiences in both typical and at-risk children.

== Books ==
- Thompson, Ross A. (7 September 2023). The Brain Development Revolution: Science, the Media, and Public Policy. Cambridge University Press. ISBN 978-1-009-30426-9.
- Thompson, R. A., Simpson, J. A., & Berlin, L. J. (Eds.), Attachment: The Fundamental Questions (Guilford, 2021, ISBN 978-1462546022).
- Melton, G. B., Thompson, R. A., & Small, M. A. (Eds.), Toward a Child-Centered, Neighborhood-Based Child Protection System (Praeger, 2002, ISBN 978-0275969103)
- Ross A. Thompson, Paul R. Amato, ed. (1999). The postdivorce family : children, parenting, and society. Thousand Oaks: Sage Publications. ISBN 978-1-4522-6375-5. OCLC 654421737.
- Thompson, R. A., Preventing Child Maltreatment Through Social Support: A Critical Analysis (Sage, 1995, ISBN 978-0803955950).
- Thompson, R. A., ed. (1990). Socioemotional development (Nebraska Symposium on Motivation). Lincoln: University of Nebraska Press. ISBN 978-0-8032-4421-4. OCLC 22813696.
- Lamb, M. E.; Thompson, R. A.; Gardner, W. P.; Charnov, E. L. (1985). Infant-mother attachment : the origins and developmental significance of individual differences in strange situation behavior. Hillsdale, N.J. ISBN 978-1-134-92918-4. OCLC 857489385.

== Selected publications ==
- Thompson, Ross A. (August 2019). "Emotion dysregulation: A theme in search of definition". Development and Psychopathology. 31 (3): 805–815. doi:10.1017/S0954579419000282. ISSN 0954-5794. PMID 31030684. S2CID 139101721.
- Thompson, R. A., & Baumrind, D. (2019). Ethics of parenting. In M. H. Bornstein (Ed.), Handbook of parenting (3rd Ed.), Vol. 5. The practice of parenting (pp. 3–33). New York: Taylor & Francis.
- Schachner, Abby C.W.; Newton, Emily K.; Thompson, Ross A.; Goodman-Wilson, Miranda (2018). "Becoming prosocial: The consistency of individual differences in early prosocial behavior". Early Childhood Research Quarterly. 43: 42–51. doi:10.1016/j.ecresq.2018.01.001.
- Thompson, R. A. (2017). Twenty-first century attachment theory. In H. Keller & K. A. Bard (Eds.), The cultural nature of attachment: Contextualizing relationships and development (pp. 301–319). Cambridge, MA: The MIT Press.
- Newton, Emily K.; Thompson, Ross A.; Goodman, Miranda (November 2016). "Individual Differences in Toddlers' Prosociality: Experiences in Early Relationships Explain Variability in Prosocial Behavior". Child Development. 87 (6): 1715–1726. doi:10.1111/cdev.12631. PMID 28262933. S2CID 207110332.
- Waters, Sara F.; Thompson, Ross A. (2016-07-03). "Children's perceptions of emotion regulation strategy effectiveness: links with attachment security". Attachment & Human Development. 18 (4): 354–372. doi:10.1080/14616734.2016.1170051. ISSN 1461-6734. PMID 27121493. S2CID 1356620.
- Thompson, R. A. (2015). The development of virtue: A perspective from developmental psychology. In N. E. Snow (Ed.), Cultivating virtue: Perspectives from philosophy, theology, and psychology (pp. 279–306). New York: Oxford University Press.
- Thompson, R. A. (2015). Social support and child protection: Lessons learned and learning. Child Abuse & Neglect, 41, 19–29. DOI: 10.1016/j.chiabu.2014.06.011.
- Thompson R. A., & Haskins R. (2014). Early stress gets under the skin: Promising initiatives to help children facing chronic adversity. The Future of Children Policy Brief, Spring, 1–7.
- Raikes, H. A., Virmani, E. A., Thompson, R. A., & Hatton, H. (2013). Declines in peer conflict from preschool through first grade: Influences from early attachment and social information processing. Attachment & Human Development, 15, 65–82. DOI: 10.1080/14616734.2012.728381.
- Thompson, R. A., Virmani, E., Waters, S. F., Meyer, S., & Raikes, A. (2013). The development of emotion self-regulation: The whole and the sum of the parts. In K. Barrett, N. A. Fox, G. A. Morgan, D. J. Fidler, & L. A. Daunhauer (Eds.), Handbook of self-regulatory processes in development: New directions and international perspectives (pp. 5–26) New York: Taylor & Francis.
- Thompson, R. A. (2012). Bridging developmental science and the law: Child-caregiver relationships. Hastings Law Journal, 63, 1443–1468.
- Thompson, Ross A. (May 2012). "Whither the Preconventional Child? Toward a Life-Span Moral Development Theory". Child Development Perspectives. 6 (4): 423–429. doi:10.1111/j.1750-8606.2012.00245.x.
- Thompson, R. A. (2011). The emotionate child. In D. Cicchetti & G. I. Roissman (Eds.), The origins and organization of adaptation and maladaptation. Minnesota Symposium on Child Psychology, Vol. 36 (pp. 13–54). New York: Wiley.
