= Ahn Chang Ho =

Korean independence activist (1878–1938)

The Right Honourable Ahn Chang Ho
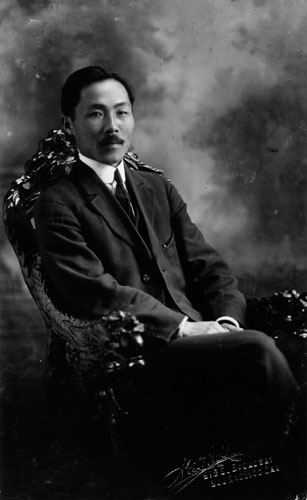
- Ahn in Los Angeles, California

6th President of the Provisional Government of the Republic of Korea
- In office May 3, 1926 – May 16, 1926
- Preceded by: Yi Dongnyeong
- Succeeded by: Yi Dongnyeong

Personal details
- Born: November 9, 1878 Kangso County, South Pyongan Province, Joseon
- Died: March 10, 1938 (aged 59) Keijō Imperial University Hospital, Keijō, Korea, Empire of Japan
- Spouse: Helen Lee (Yi Hye-ryon)
- Children: 5; including Philip, Susan and Ralph
- Religion: Protestantism (Presbyterianism)

Korean name
- Hangul: 안창호
- Hanja: 安昌浩
- RR: An Changho
- MR: An Ch'angho
- IPA: [ɐntɕʰɐŋɦo]

Former name
- Hangul: 안치삼
- Hanja: 安致三
- RR: An Chisam
- MR: An Ch'isam

Ahn Chang Ho (Korean: 안창호; Hanja: 安昌浩; November 9, 1878 – March 10, 1938), sometimes An Chang-ho, was a prominent Korean politician, Korean independence activist, and an early leader of the Korean-American immigrant community in the United States. He is also commonly referred to by his art name Dosan (도산; 島山; [tosʰan]).

He and his wife were the first Koreans to legally immigrate to the US as a married couple. Ahn was a Protestant social activist who in 1907 established the later prominent Korean independence organization Shinminhoe when he returned to Korea from the US. He also established the Young Korean Academy in San Francisco in 1913, (Note: Korean: 흥사단; Hanja: 興士團) and was a key founding member of the Provisional Government of the Republic of Korea in Shanghai in 1919. He is also one of two men believed to have written the lyrics of the South Korean national anthem, "Aegukga".

== Early life ==
Ahn was born Ahn Chi-sam (안치삼; 安致三) on 9 November 1878 in Kangso County, Pyeongan Province, Joseon (present-day South Pyongan, North Korea). He was the third son of father An Hŭng-kuk, (Note: 안흥국; 安興國) and mother Hwang Mong-un. (Note: 황몽운) Ahn came from the Sunheung Ahn clan, and his ancestry can be traced back to the prominent Goryeo scholar Ahn Hyang.

Ahn was born into an impoverished farming family during the unstable last few decades of the Joseon dynasty. He began studying at a seodang around age 8 in preparation for the gwageo, the demanding civil service examinations that determined placement in government intellectual jobs. After his father died when he was around age 11, he was raised by his grandfather.

Ahn changed his name around age 10; his father also changed his name from Ahn Kyo-jin to Ahn Heung-guk.

In 1895, 16-year-old Ahn was disturbed by the destruction of the First Sino-Japanese War, and became determined to improve Korea. He moved to Seoul to receive a Western-style education at a Presbyterian missionary-sponsored school in Seoul run by Horace Grant Underwood and Rev. F. S. Miller called Kusehaktang. (Note: 구세학당; 救世學堂) He studied there for three years, converting to Christianity and working for Dr. Oliver R. Avison at Chejungwon, the first medical institution in Korea (now part of Yonsei University Medical Center).

Around 1897, he joined the Independence Club and became a leader of its Pyongyang branch. Through this short-lived club, he gave speeches to crowds of hundreds and became associated with people who would become prominent in the independence movement, including Syngman Rhee and Yun Ch'iho. He also became engaged to his future wife Helen Ahn around this time.

He then returned to his home province of Pyeongan, and around 1899 established the Chŏmjin school, (Note: 점진학교; 漸進學校) the first coeducational school founded by a Korean, and the T'anp'ori Church. (Note: 탄포리교회) He then decided to further his education by going to the US. He married Helen on 3 September 1902, and shortly afterwards departed for the US.

== Immigration to America ==
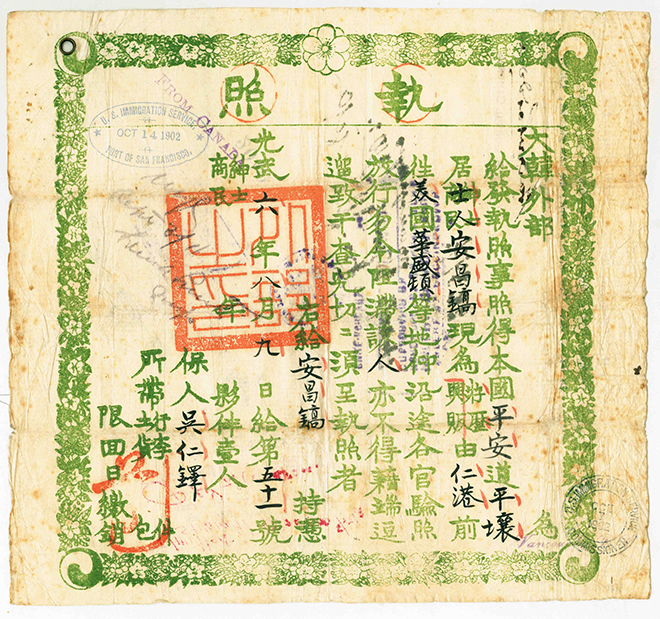
Ahn's original passport, numbered 51, issued by the Korean Empire on 9 August 1902, is now located in the Independence Hall of Korea.

On October 14, 1902, Ahn and his wife arrived in San Francisco. They were among the first Koreans to move to the US, and the first married Korean couple to do so, with passports numbered 51 and 52. In order to learn how to speak English, Ahn enrolled in an American primary school. He also sought work from Koreans who had already settled there.

The couple had a difficult time finding work due to anti-Asian sentiment and their poor English skills. While work was available in the agricultural sector, Korean immigrants still had a difficult time getting employment there due to a Japanese monopoly on labor contracts and the lack of their own labor bureau.

=== Pachappa Camp ===
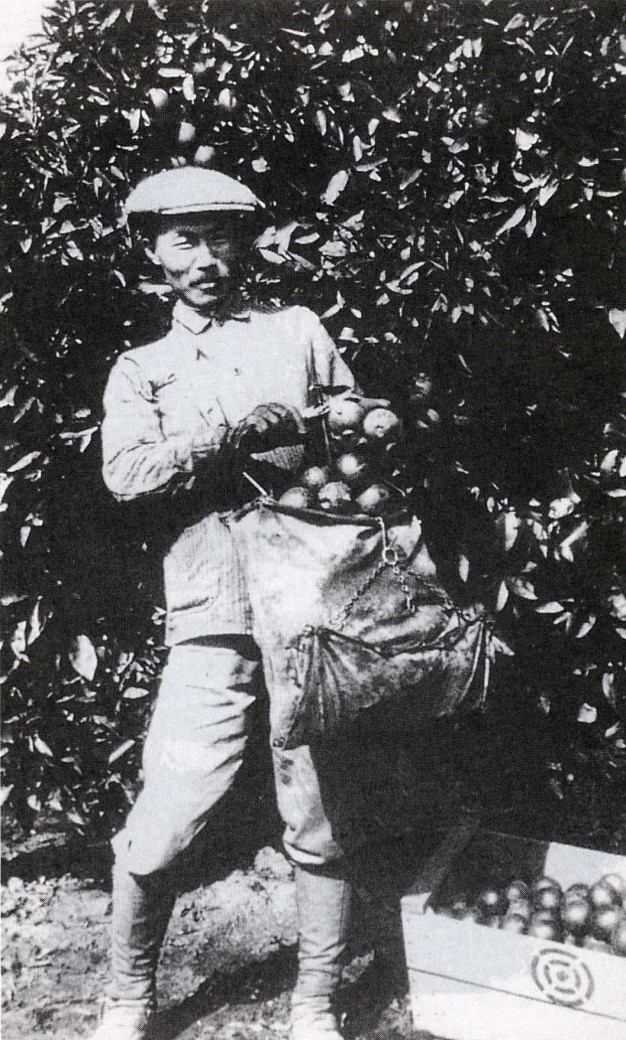
Ahn Chang Ho picking oranges in Riverside (1912)

In 1904, they moved to Riverside after encouragement from two Korean friends who worked on citrus farms there. There, Ahn acquired employment at Alta Cresta Groves and help establishing the Korean Employment Bureau (also "Korean Labor Bureau"), which contributed to the growth of the Korean population there. Ultimately, his efforts to bring Koreans there led to the establishment of Pachappa Camp, also sometimes called "Dosan's Republic". A number of academics and city of Riverside consider it to be the first Korean settlement in the US, and in 2017 the Camp was designated a "Point of Cultural Interest" by the Riverside City Council.

=== Korean National Association ===
Kim was a founder and leader of a series of early Korean American organizations that eventually become the Korean National Association.

On September 22, 1903, Ahn and eight others founded the first ever Korean American organization, the Korean Friendship Society, (Note: 한인친목회; 韓人親睦會) and he was elected its first president. During that time, around 20 Koreans lived in San Francisco, including the Ahns. In 1904, this group played a key role in settling and educating hundreds of Korean immigrants coming from Asia and Hawaii. On 4 April 1905, the Society changed its name to the Mutual Assistance Society (or alternatively Mutual Assistance Association). (Note: 공립협회; 共立協會) Its headquarters was at 938 Pacific St. in San Francisco. Under the Society's umbrella, Ahn also co-founded a newspaper entitled The United Korean (also "Kong Lip Shinbo" or "The Independent"), (Note: 공립신보; 共立新報) on 20 November 1905. It was the predecessor of the 1909 newspaper Sinhan Minbo. During the 1906 San Francisco Earthquake, their office burned down, leading them to publish from Oakland instead. The Sinhan Minbo would continue to publish and be a significant source of news about the Korean peninsula until well after World War II.

On March 23, 1908, Durham Stevens was assassinated, after publicly claiming that Korea was better off under Japanese occupation. This created massive anti-Korean sentiment. In response, the Mutual Assistance Society merged with the Hawaii-based United Korean Society, (Note: 한인합성협회; 韓人合成協會) becoming the Korean National Association on 10 February 1909. This newly-formed group was widely regarded as representing Korean-Americans until the end of World War II.

== Return to Korea ==
In 1926, he departed San Pedro, California by ship, heading for China. He would not return to the United States often from this point onwards, although he and his family remained registered as residents of 106 North Figueroa St, Los Angeles through April 24, 1930. Over the course of Ahn's anti-Japanese activism in Korea, he was arrested and imprisoned by the Japanese Imperial government at least five times. He was first arrested in 1909 in connection with Ahn Jung-geun's assassination of Itō Hirobumi, the Japanese Resident General of Korea. Ahn was tortured and punished many times over the course of his years of his activism. In 1932 he was arrested in Shanghai, China in connection with Yun Bong-gil's bombing at Hongkew Park (April 29, 1932). He was a naturalized Chinese citizen by this time and was illegally extradited to Korea, where he was convicted of violating Japan's "Preservation of Peace Laws" and sentenced to five years in Daejeon prison.

=== Death ===
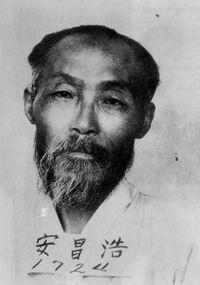
Ahn Chang-ho (1937.11.10)

In 1937, Japanese authorities arrested Ahn, but due to complications from severe internal illness, he was released on bail and transferred to the Keijō Imperial University (now Seoul National University Hospital) where he died on March 10, 1938. Judging that Ahn Changho's death might lead to rebellion, the Japanese military limited the number of mourners at his funeral, allowing only a small number of relatives to attend.

== Legacy and memorials ==
Many consider Ahn Chang-ho to be one of the key moral and philosophical leaders of Korea during the 20th century. In the turmoil immediately before and during the Japanese occupation of Korea, he called for the moral and spiritual renewal of the Korean people through education as one of the key components of their struggle for independence toward building a democratic society. Ahn also included economic and military components in his independence movement strategies.

Dosan Park and Memorial Hall were built in Ahn's memory in Gangnam District, Seoul. Another memorial was built in downtown Riverside, California, to honor him. Ahn's family home on 36th Place in Los Angeles has been restored by the University of Southern California (USC), on whose campus it sits (albeit in a different location). Ahn never lived in the house on the USC campus since the Ahn family moved there in 1935 many years after Ahn had gone back to Shanghai.

At the request of Congresswoman Diane Watson, the USPS Post Office in Koreatown at Harvard and 6th Street was named Dosan Ahn Chang Ho Station. This was the first USPS naming honoring an Asian.

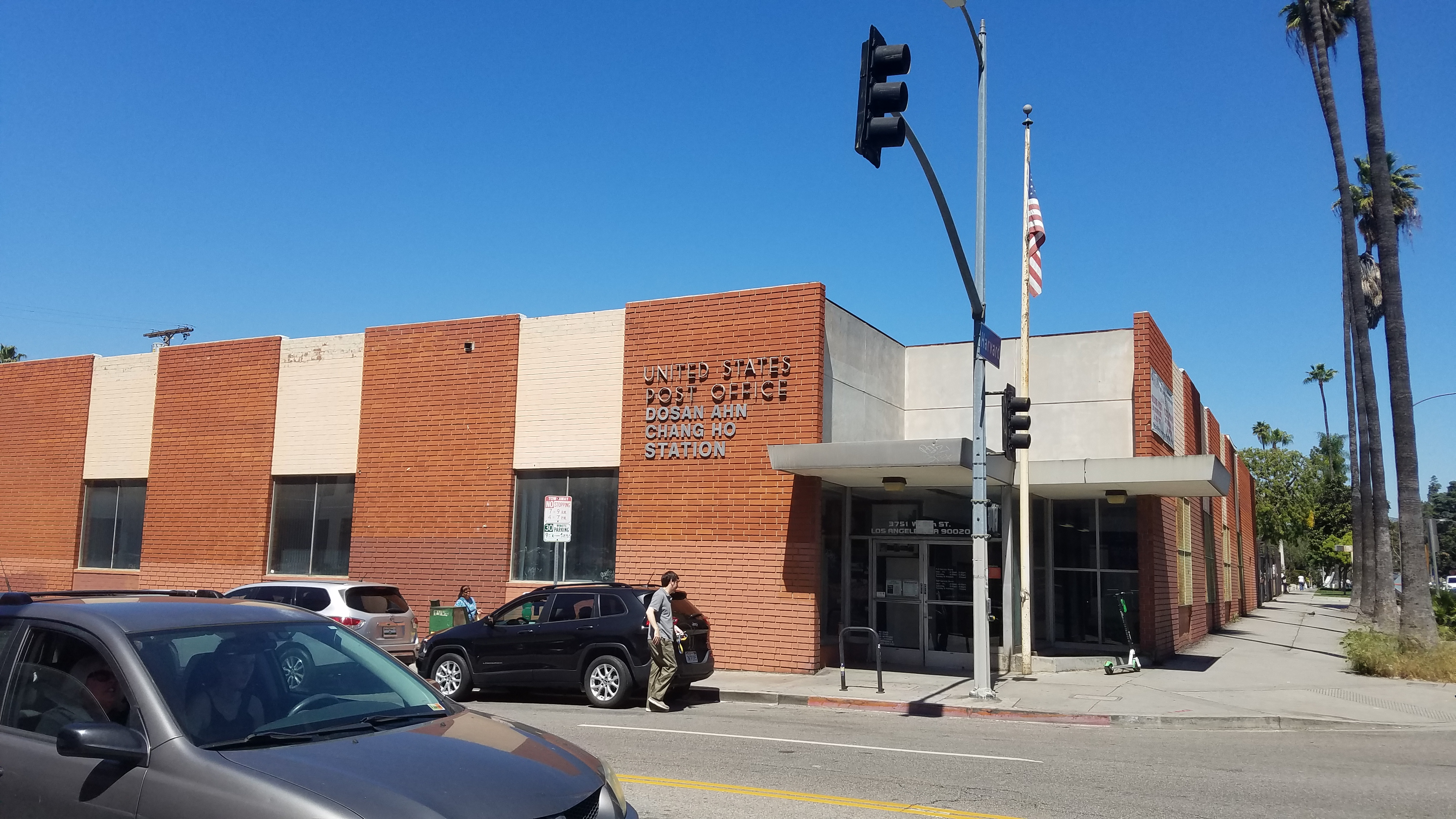
Dosan Ahn Changho Post Office in Koreatown, Los Angeles

In 2011, the Ellis Island Foundation installed a plaque honoring Ahn to commemorate the 100th anniversary of his entrance to the United States through Ellis Island from London on September 3, 1911. He sailed from Glasgow aboard the SS Caledonia.

The City of Los Angeles, in the early 1990s, named the intersection of Jefferson Boulevard and Van Buren Place - across from the Korean National Association and Korean Presbyterian church - "Dosan Ahn Chang Ho Square" in his honor. In 2002, the main freeway interchange in downtown Los Angeles where the 10 Freeway and 110 Freeway meet was also renamed the Dosan Ahn Chang Ho Memorial Interchange.

The third pattern of ITF-style Taekwondo, which is made up of 24 movements, is called Do-San in his honor.

In 2012, Ahn was posthumously inducted into the International Civil Rights Walk of Fame at the Martin Luther King Jr. National Historic Site in Atlanta, Georgia. His grandson Philip Cuddy accepted the honor at the ceremony in Atlanta on his behalf.

On November 8, 2013, Ahn was given an Honorary Diploma by his alma mater, Yonsei University, in recognition of his service as a teaching assistant at Gusae Hakdang and for his work at Jejungwon and Severance Hospital. Ahn was also a positive influence on many Yonsei and Severance Medical School alumni. Susan Cuddy's son, Philip Cuddy pressed for the awarding of the honorary diploma and provided the historical records. Yonsei President accepted the diploma in a ceremony in Seoul on Ahn's behalf.

The Republic of Korea Navy Dosan Ahn Changho-class submarine was named for him and the lead ship entered service on 13 August 2021.

== Personal life ==
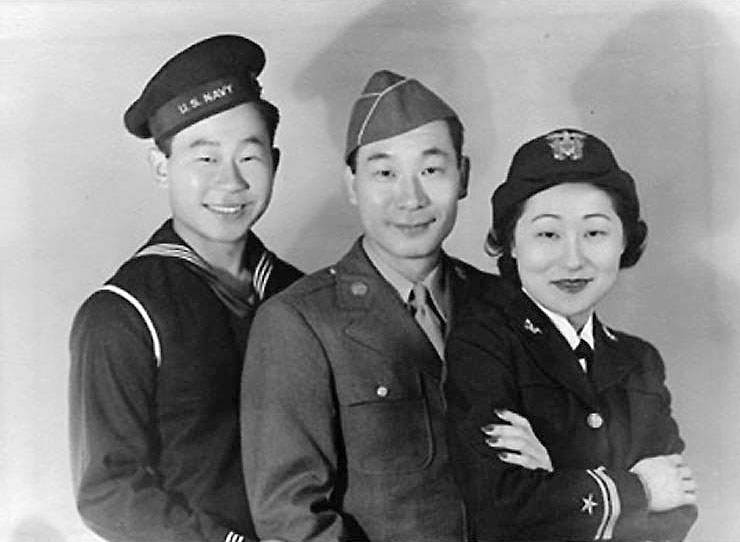
Ahn's children, Ralph, Philip, and Susan during World War II

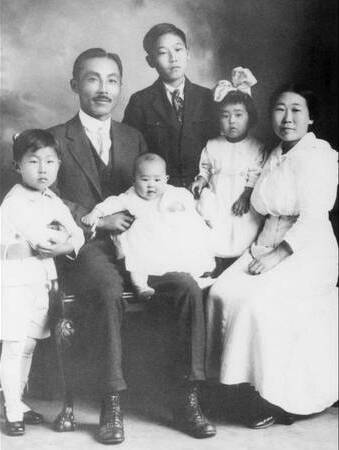
The Ahn Family in Los Angeles . From left, Philson, Changho, Soorah (lap), Philip, Susan and Helen (1917)

Ahn married Helen Ahn (née Lee) (이혜련; 李惠鍊; I Hyeryeon; 21 April 1884 – 21 April 1969) on 3 September 1902, shortly before their immigration to the US, and they remained married until his death in 1938. She was a housewife and raised the couple's children on her own for many years. She also actively supported the independence movement through local fundraising and community organizing. She was posthumously awarded the Order of Merit for National Foundation in 2008 by the South Korean government and is buried in Dosan Park, along with her husband.

The couple had three sons and two daughters. Sons Philip Ahn and Ralph Ahn were actors. Philip is considered the first Korean-American actor in Hollywood and one of the most prolific Asian-American actors of his time, and has a star on the Hollywood Walk of Fame.

Susan Ahn Cuddy was a US Navy lieutenant who worked for the Office of Naval Intelligence, the National Security Agency, the Library of Congress, and the US Department of Defense. She was the first woman to serve as a gunnery officer in the U.S. Navy.

Soorah Ahn Buffum (안수라; 安秀羅; 27 May 1917 – 18 June 2016) was a restaurateur and 1948 graduate of USC. She died at age 99.

Philson Ahn (안필선; 安必善; 5 July 1912 – 23 May 2001) was an engineer and aerospace executive. He acted in minor roles in several films and attained his Bachelor in Chemistry from the University of California, Berkeley. He never learned to speak Korean very well. Despite the mistrust of Asians during World War II, he worked at the Hughes Aircraft Company first as a chemist and later as a manager, and contributed to the development of the infamous Hughes H-4 Hercules. In the later parts of the war, he was later scouted by the US Office of Strategic Services, which worked on missions such as the Eagle Project to destabilize Japan, but was prevented from doing so by his company. He visited Korea for the first time in 1992 at age 79.

== See also ==
- Korea under Japanese rule
- Korean independence movements

== Notes and references ==
=== References ===
Political offices
Preceded by Yi Dong-nyeong	Presidents of Provisional Government of the Republic of Korea; 1926	Succeeded by Yi Dong-nyeong
